= David Bowie (box set) =

Box set by David Bowie
- Released: June 2007
- Recorded: 1995–2003; Except "Panic in Detroit", 1979
- Genre: Rock
- Length: 580:55
- Labels: Sony Music; Columbia
- Producers: David Bowie; Brian Eno; Mark Plati; Reeves Gabrels; Tony Visconti

David Bowie chronology
The Best of David Bowie 1980/1987 (2007)	David Bowie (2007)	Live Santa Monica '72 (2008)

David Bowie box set chronology
The Platinum Collection (2005)	David Bowie (2007)	Five Years (1969–1973) (2015)

Professional ratings
Review scores
Source	Rating
Allmusic	3.5/5 stars
Pitchfork Media	(4.6/10)

David Bowie (often referred to as David Bowie Box or Bowie Box Set) is a box set by English singer-songwriter David Bowie, released in June 2007 by Sony Music Entertainment and Columbia Records. The box set includes expanded versions of all of Bowie's Sony-owned albums: Outside, Earthling, Hours, Heathen and Reality. (Three albums—Outside, Earthling, and Hours—were originally issued on Virgin Records in America, but released by BMG internationally).

== Track listing ==
=== Outside ===
Disc 1

1. "Leon Takes Us Outside"
2. "Outside"
3. "The Hearts Filthy Lesson"
4. "Small Plot of Land"
5. "Segue – Baby Grace (A Horrid Cassette)"
6. "Hallo Spaceboy"
7. "The Motel"
8. "I Have Not Been to Oxford Town"
9. "No Control"
10. "Segue – Algeria Touchshriek"
11. "Voyeur of Utter Destruction (As Beauty)"
12. "Segue – Ramona A. Stone/I Am with Name"
13. "Wishful Beginnings"
14. "We Prick You"
15. "Segue – Nathan Adler"
16. "I'm Deranged"
17. "Thru' These Architects Eyes"
18. "Segue – Nathan Adler"
19. "Strangers When We Meet"

Disc 2 – Bonus

1. "The Hearts Filthy Lesson (Trent Reznor alternative mix)"
2. "The Hearts Filthy Lesson (Rubber mix)"
3. "The Hearts Filthy Lesson (Simple Test mix)"
4. "The Hearts Filthy Lesson (Filthy mix)"
5. "The Hearts Filthy Lesson (Good Karma mix by Tim Simenon)"
6. "Small Plot of Land" (Basquiat OST version)
7. "Hallo Spaceboy (12" remix)"
8. "Hallo Spaceboy (Double Click mix)"
9. "Hallo Spaceboy (Instrumental)"
10. "Hallo Spaceboy (Lost in Space mix)"
11. "I Am with Name"
12. "I'm Deranged (Jungle mix)"
13. "Get Real" ("Strangers When We Meet" UK CD single)
14. "Nothing to Be Desired"

=== Earthling ===
Disc 1

1. "Little Wonder"
2. "Looking for Satellites"
3. "Battle for Britain (The Letter)"
4. "Seven Years in Tibet"
5. "Dead Man Walking"
6. "Telling Lies"
7. "The Last Thing You Should Do"
8. "I'm Afraid of Americans"
9. "Law (Earthlings on Fire)"

Disc 2 – Bonus

1. "Little Wonder" (Censored video edit)
2. "Little Wonder" (Junior Vasquez club mix)
3. "Little Wonder" (Danny Saber dance mix)
4. "Seven Years in Tibet" (Mandarin version)
5. "Dead Man Walking" (Moby Mix 1)
6. "Dead Man Walking" (Moby Mix 2 US 12" promo)
7. "Telling Lies" (Feelgood mix)
8. "Telling Lies" (Paradox mix)
9. "I'm Afraid of Americans" (Showgirls OST version)
10. "I'm Afraid of Americans" (Nine Inch Nails V1 mix)
11. "I'm Afraid of Americans" (Nine Inch Nails V1 clean edit)
12. "V-2 Schneider" (Tao Jones Index) (Live at the Paradiso, Amsterdam, June 1997)
13. "Pallas Athena" (Tao Jones Index) (Live at the Paradiso, Amsterdam, June 1997)

=== Hours ===
Disc 1

1. "Thursday's Child"
2. "Something in the Air"
3. "Survive"
4. "If I'm Dreaming My Life"
5. "Seven"
6. "What's Really Happening?"
7. "The Pretty Things Are Going to Hell"
8. "New Angels of Promise"
9. "Brilliant Adventure"
10. "The Dreamers"

Disc 2 – Bonus

1. "Thursday's Child" (Rock mix)
2. "Thursday's Child" (Omikron: The Nomad Soul slower version)
3. "Something in the Air" (American Psycho remix)
4. "Survive" (Marius de Vries mix) (UK CD single)
5. "Seven" (Demo)
6. "Seven" (Marius De Vries mix)
7. "Seven" (Beck Mix #1)
8. "Seven" (Beck Mix #2)
9. "The Pretty Things Are Going to Hell" (Edit)
10. "The Pretty Things Are Going to Hell" (Stigmata film version)
11. "The Pretty Things Are Going to Hell" (Stigmata film-only version)
12. "New Angels of Promise" (Omikron: The Nomad Soul version)
13. "The Dreamers" (Omikron: The Nomad Soul longer version)
14. "1917"
15. "We Shall Go to Town"
16. "We All Go Through"
17. "No One Calls"

=== Heathen ===
Disc 1

1. "Sunday"
2. "Cactus"
3. "Slip Away"
4. "Slow Burn"
5. "Afraid"
6. "I've Been Waiting for You"
7. "I Would Be Your Slave"
8. "I Took a Trip on a Gemini Spaceship"
9. "5:15 The Angels Have Gone"
10. "Everyone Says 'Hi'"
11. "A Better Future"
12. "Heathen (The Rays)"

Disc 2 – Bonus

1. "Sunday (Moby remix)"
2. "Better Future" (Remix by Air)
3. "Conversation Piece" (Written in 1969, recorded in 1970, and re-recorded in 2002)
4. "Panic in Detroit" (Outtake from a 1979 recording)
5. "Wood Jackson"
6. "When the Boys Come Marching Home"
7. "Baby Loves That Way"
8. "You've Got a Habit of Leaving"
9. "Safe"
10. "Shadow Man"

=== Reality ===
Disc 1

1. "New Killer Star"
2. "Pablo Picasso"
3. "Never Get Old"
4. "The Loneliest Guy"
5. "Looking for Water"
6. "She'll Drive the Big Car"
7. "Days"
8. "Fall Dog Bombs the Moon"
9. "Try Some, Buy Some"
10. "Reality"
11. "Bring Me the Disco King"

Disc 2 – Bonus

1. "Waterloo Sunset" (Non-album track)
2. "Fly"
3. "Queen of All the Tarts (Overture)"
4. "Rebel Rebel (2003)"
5. "Love Missile F1-11 (Non-album track)"
6. "Rebel Never Gets Old (Radio mix)"
7. "Rebel Never Gets Old (7th Heaven edit)"
8. "Rebel Never Gets Old (7th Heaven mix)"
