= I Can't Give Everything Away (2002–2016) =

Box set by David Bowie
- Released: 12 September 2025
- Recorded: August 2001 – May 2015
- Genres: Art rock; experimental rock; alternative rock; jazz rock
- Label: Parlophone
- Producers: David Bowie; Tony Visconti; Mark Plati; Gary Miller; Brian Rawling

David Bowie chronology
Ready, Set, Go! (Live, Riverside Studios '03) (2025)	I Can't Give Everything Away (2002–2016) (2025)	The Shel Talmy Recordings (2026)

David Bowie box set chronology
Rock 'n' Roll Star! (2024)	I Can't Give Everything Away (2002–2016) (2025)

I Can't Give Everything Away (2002–2016) is a box set by the English musician David Bowie, released on 12 September 2025. It is the sixth and final installment in a collection of era box sets that cover Bowie's music career, starting with Five Years (1969–1973). The box set covers the period from 2002 to 2016, spanning the return of Tony Visconti as producer for the first time since 1980's Scary Monsters (and Super Creeps) and Bowie's death from liver cancer two days after the release of Blackstar. (Note: Stylized as ★)

Professional ratings
Aggregate scores
Source	Rating
Metacritic	89/100
Review scores
Source	Rating
Record Collector	4/5 stars

== Overview ==
The name of the box set comes from the closing track on Bowie's final studio album Blackstar (2016) and was compiled with his long term producer and collaborator Tony Visconti.

It comprises 13 CDs, which features new remasters of the studio albums Heathen (2002), Reality (2003), and The Next Day (2013) and of the EP The Next Day Extra. Blackstar (2016) and the EP No Plan (2017) are also included, but are not remastered. It also features previously unreleased material, single mixes and demos in an exclusive compilation album called Re:Call 6.

The box set's exclusive content includes 2010's A Reality Tour in remastered and resequenced form, and Montreux Jazz Festival, a previously unreleased live album recorded at the eponymous event in July 2002. The release also comes with a 128 page booklet, which covers previously unreleased notes, drawings, and handwritten lyrics from Bowie himself, as well as photos, images of memorabilia, and notes on the albums written by Visconti.

== Track listing ==
=== Heathen (2025 remaster) ===
All tracks are written by David Bowie, and produced by Bowie and Tony Visconti, except where noted

No.	Title	Writer(s)	Producer(s)	Length
1.	"Sunday"			4:45
2.	"Cactus"	Black Francis		2:54
3.	"Slip Away"			6:05
4.	"Slow Burn"			4:41
5.	"Afraid"		Bowie; Mark Plati	3:28
6.	"I've Been Waiting for You"	Neil Young		3:00
7.	"I Would Be Your Slave"			5:14
8.	"I Took a Trip on a Gemini Spaceship"	Norman Carl Odam		4:04
9.	"5:15 The Angels Have Gone"			5:00
10.	"Everyone Says 'Hi'"		Brian Rawling; Gary Miller	3:59
11.	"A Better Future"			4:11
12.	"Heathen (The Rays)"			4:16
Total length:				52:08

=== Montreux Jazz Festival ===
All tracks are written by David Bowie, except where noted.

Disc one
No.	Title	Writer(s)	Original Album	Length
1.	"Sunday"		Heathen (2002)	6:20
2.	"Life on Mars?"		Hunky Dory (1971)	4:50
3.	"Ashes to Ashes"		Scary Monsters (and Super Creeps) (1980)	5:55
4.	"Cactus"	Black Francis	Heathen	3:12
5.	"Slip Away"		Heathen	5:43
6.	"China Girl"	David Bowie; Iggy Pop	Let's Dance (1983)	4:23
7.	"Starman"		The Rise and Fall of Ziggy Stardust and the Spiders from Mars (1972)	4:44
8.	"I Would Be Your Slave"		Heathen	5:50
9.	"I've Been Waiting for You"	Neil Young	Heathen	5:19
10.	"Stay"		Station to Station (1976)	6:17
11.	"Changes"		Hunky Dory	4:11
12.	"Fashion"		Scary Monsters (and Super Creeps)	4:09
13.	"Fame"	Bowie; John Lennon; Carlos Alomar	Young Americans (1975)	4:21
14.	"I'm Afraid of Americans"	Bowie; Brian Eno	Earthling	5:18
15.	"5:15 The Angels Have Gone"		Heathen	5:17

Disc two
No.	Title	Writer(s)	Original Album	Length
1.	"'Heroes'"	Bowie; Eno	"Heroes" (1977)	6:03
2.	"Heathen (The Rays)"		Heathen	6:08
3.	"Everyone Says 'Hi'"		Heathen	5:07
4.	"Hallo Spaceboy"	Bowie; Eno	Outside (1995)	5:26
5.	"Let's Dance"		Let's Dance	6:35
6.	"Ziggy Stardust"		The Rise and Fall of Ziggy Stardust and the Spiders from Mars	4:45
7.	"Warszawa"	Bowie; Eno	Low (1977)	6:25
8.	"Speed of Life"		Low	2:54
9.	"Breaking Glass"	Bowie; George Murray; Dennis Davis	Low	2:35
10.	"What in the World"		Low	3:29
11.	"Sound and Vision"		Low	4:30
12.	"Art Decade"		Low	4:04
13.	"Always Crashing in the Same Car"		Low	3:42
14.	"Be My Wife"		Low	3:06
15.	"A New Career in a New Town"		Low	3:37
16.	"Subterraneans"		Low	7:32

=== Reality (2025 remaster) ===
All tracks are written by David Bowie, except where noted.

No.	Title	Writer(s)	Length
1.	"New Killer Star"		4:40
2.	"Pablo Picasso"	Jonathan Richman	4:06
3.	"Never Get Old"		4:25
4.	"The Loneliest Guy"		4:11
5.	"Looking for Water"		3:28
6.	"She'll Drive the Big Car"		4:35
7.	"Days"		3:19
8.	"Fall Dog Bombs the Moon"		4:04
9.	"Try Some, Buy Some"	George Harrison	4:24
10.	"Reality"		4:23
11.	"Bring Me the Disco King"		7:45
Total length:			49:25

=== A Reality Tour (2025 remaster and re-sequence) ===
All tracks are written by David Bowie, except where noted.

Disc one
No.	Title	Writer(s)	Original Album	Length
1.	"Rebel Rebel"		Diamond Dogs (1974)	3:30
2.	"New Killer Star"		Reality (2003)	4:59
3.	"Reality"		Reality	5:08
4.	"Fame"	Bowie; John Lennon; Carlos Alomar	Young Americans (1975)	4:12
5.	"Cactus"	Black Francis	Heathen (2002)	3:01
6.	"Sister Midnight"	Bowie; Alomar; Iggy Pop	The Idiot (by Iggy Pop (1977))	4:37
7.	"Afraid"		Heathen	3:28
8.	"All the Young Dudes"		All the Young Dudes (by Mott the Hoople (1972))	3:48
9.	"Be My Wife"		Low (1977)	3:15
10.	"China Girl"	Bowie; Pop	Let's Dance (1983)
11.	"The Loneliest Guy"		Reality	3:58
12.	"The Man Who Sold the World"		The Man Who Sold the World (1970)	4:18
13.	"Fantastic Voyage"	Bowie; Brian Eno	Lodger (1979)	3:13
14.	"Hallo Spaceboy"	Bowie; Brian Eno	Outside (1995)	5:28
15.	"Sunday"		Heathen	7:56
16.	"Under Pressure"	Bowie; Freddie Mercury; John Deacon; Brian May; Roger Taylor	Hot Space (by Queen (1982))	4:18
17.	"Life on Mars?"		Hunky Dory (1971)	4:40
18.	"Battle for Britain (The Letter)"	Bowie; Reeves Gabrels; Mark Plati	Earthling (1997)	4:55

Disc two
No.	Title	Writer(s)	Original Album	Length
1.	"Fall Dog Bombs the Moon"		Reality
2.	"Ashes to Ashes"		Scary Monsters (And Super Creeps) (1980)	5:46
3.	"The Motel"		Outside	5:44
4.	"Loving the Alien"		Tonight (1984)	5:17
5.	"Breaking Glass"	Bowie; Dennis Davis; George Murray	Low
6.	"Never Get Old"		Reality	4:18
7.	"Changes"		Hunky Dory	3:51
8.	"I'm Afraid of Americans"	Bowie; Eno	Earthling	5:17
9.	"'Heroes'"	Bowie; Eno	"Heroes" (1977)	6:58
10.	"Bring Me the Disco King"		Reality	7:56
11.	"Slip Away"		Heathen	5:56
12.	"Heathen (The Rays)"		Heathen	6:24
13.	"Five Years"		The Rise and Fall of Ziggy Stardust and the Spiders from Mars (1972)	4:19
14.	"Hang On to Yourself"		The Rise and Fall of Ziggy Stardust and the Spiders from Mars	2:50
15.	"Ziggy Stardust"		The Rise and Fall of Ziggy Stardust and the Spiders from Mars	3:44

=== The Next Day (2025 remaster) ===
All music is composed by David Bowie, except where noted.

No.	Title	Music	Length
1.	"The Next Day"		3:27
2.	"Dirty Boys"		2:58
3.	"The Stars (Are Out Tonight)"		3:56
4.	"Love Is Lost"		3:57
5.	"Where Are We Now?"		4:08
6.	"Valentine's Day"		3:01
7.	"If You Can See Me"		3:15
8.	"I'd Rather Be High"		3:53
9.	"Boss of Me"	Bowie; Gerry Leonard	4:09
10.	"Dancing Out in Space"		3:24
11.	"How Does the Grass Grow?"	Bowie; Jerry Lordan	4:33
12.	"(You Will) Set the World on Fire"		3:30
13.	"You Feel So Lonely You Could Die"		4:37
14.	"Heat"		4:25
Total length:			53:17

=== The Next Day Extra E.P. (2025 remaster) ===
All tracks are written by David Bowie, except where noted.

No.	Title	Music	Length
1.	"Atomica"		4:05
2.	"Love Is Lost" (Hello Steve Reich Mix by James Murphy for the DFA)		10:24
3.	"Plan"		2:02
4.	"The Informer"		4:31
5.	"I'd Rather Be High" (Venetian Mix)		3:49
6.	"Like a Rocket Man"		3:29
7.	"Born in a UFO"		3:02
8.	"I'll Take You There"	Bowie; Leonard	2:41
9.	"God Bless the Girl"		4:11
10.	"So She"		2:31
Total length:			40:45

=== Blackstar ===
All tracks are written by David Bowie, except where noted.

Blackstar track listing
No.	Title	Music	Length
1.	"Blackstar"		9:57
2.	"'Tis a Pity She Was a Whore"		4:52
3.	"Lazarus"		6:22
4.	"Sue (Or in a Season of Crime)"	Bowie; Maria Schneider; Paul Bateman; Bob Bhamra	4:40
5.	"Girl Loves Me"		4:52
6.	"Dollar Days"		4:44
7.	"I Can't Give Everything Away"		5:47
Total length:			41:14

=== No Plan ===
All tracks are written by David Bowie.

No.	Title	Length
1.	"Lazarus"	6:24
2.	"No Plan"	3:40
3.	"Killing a Little Time"	3:46
4.	"When I Met You"	4:09
Total length:		17:59

=== Re:Call 6 ===
All tracks are written by David Bowie, except where noted.

Disc one
No.	Title	Writer(s)	Length
1.	"Slow Burn" (Single Edit)		3:56
2.	"Wood Jackson" ("Slow Burn" 7" B-Side)		4:50
3.	"When the Boys Come Marching Home"		4:48
4.	"Safe"		4:45
5.	"Sunday" (Moby Remix)		5:12
6.	"A Better Future" (Remix by Air)		4:59
7.	"Slip Away" (SACD Mix)		6:14
8.	"Slow Burn" (SACD Mix)		5:05
9.	"I've Been Waiting for You" (SACD Mix)	Neil Young	3:18
10.	"5:15 The Angels Have Gone" (SACD Mix)		5:25
11.	"A Better Future" (SACD Mix)		3:55
12.	"Safe" (SACD Mix)		5:54
13.	"Everyone Says 'Hi'" (Radio Edit)		3:30

Disc two
No.	Title	Writer(s)	Length
1.	"Sunday" (Tony Visconti Mix)		5:00
2.	"Everyone Says 'Hi'" (Metro Remix Radio Edit)		3:41
3.	"Heathen (The Rays)" (Live In Berlin, 22/09/02)		5:57
4.	"Hop Frog" (Lou Reed featuring David Bowie)	Lou Reed	1:47
5.	"Saviour" (Kristeen Young featuring David Bowie)	Kristeen Young	5:25
6.	"Isn't It Evening (The Revolutionary)" (Earl Slick featuring David Bowie)	Earl Slick; Royston Langdon	4:57
7.	"Bring Me the Disco King" (Loner Mix; featuring Maynard James Keenan & John Frusciante)		6:10
8.	"New Killer Star" (Radio Edit)		3:43
9.	"Love Missile F1-11" ("New Killer Star" B-side; Sigue Sigue Sputnik cover)	Anthony James, Martin Degville, Neal Whitmore	4:15
10.	"Fly"		4:10
11.	"Queen of All the Tarts (Overture)"		2:52
12.	"Never Get Old" (Single Edit)		3:41
13.	"Waterloo Sunset"	Ray Davies	3:30
14.	"Rebel Rebel" (2003 Re-Record; from Charlie's Angels: Full Throttle Soundtrack)		3:10
15.	"New Killer Star" (Sessions @ AOL Live Version, 23/09/03)		4:49

Disc three
No.	Title	Writer(s)	Length
1.	"Days" (Live)		3:22
2.	"5:15 The Angels Have Gone" (Live)		5:25
3.	"Rebel Never Gets Old" (Radio Mix)		3:26
4.	"(She Can) Do That" (David Bowie and BT; from the Stealth Soundtrack)		3:16
5.	"Life On Mars?" (Live at Fashion Rocks, 08/09/05)		4:45
6.	"Wake Up" (David Bowie with Arcade Fire; Live at Fashion Rocks, 08/09/05)	Will Butler; Win Butler; Régine Chassagne; Tim Kingsbury; Richard Reed Parry	6:18
7.	"Five Years" (David Bowie with Arcade Fire; Live at Fashion Rocks, 08/09/05)		3:51
8.	"Arnold Layne" (David Gilmour featuring David Bowie; Live at The Royal Albert Hall, 29/05/06)	Syd Barrett	4:03
9.	"Love Is Lost" (Hello Steve Reich Mix by James Murphy for the DFA)		4:09
10.	"Sue (Or in a Season of Crime)" (2014 Version)	Bowie; Maria Schneider; Paul Bateman; Bob Bhamra	7:26
11.	"'Tis a Pity She Was a Whore" (2014 Version)		5:26
12.	"Lazarus" (Radio Edit)		4:07
13.	"I Can't Give Everything Away" (Radio Edit)		4:25

== Charts ==
Chart performance for I Can't Give Everything Away (2002–2016)
Chart (2025)	Peak position
Austrian Albums (Ö3 Austria)	21
Belgian Albums (Ultratop Flanders)	13
Belgian Albums (Ultratop Wallonia)	28
Croatian International Albums (HDU)	8
Dutch Albums (Album Top 100)	39
France (SNEP)	75
German Albums (Offizielle Top 100)	6
German Rock & Metal Albums (Offizielle Top 100)	3
Japanese Rock Albums (Oricon)	10
Japanese Western Albums (Oricon)	18
Scottish Albums (Official Charts)	8
Swiss Albums (Schweizer Hitparade)	17
UK Albums (Official Charts)	49
US Top Album Sales (Billboard)	50
