= A Reality Tour (album) =

2010 live album by David Bowie

Live album by David Bowie
- Released: 25 January 2010
- Recorded: 22–23 November 2003
- Venue: Point Theatre, Dublin
- Genre: Rock
- Length: 154:00
- Label: ISO, Columbia, Legacy
- Producer: Jerry Rappaport

David Bowie chronology
VH1 Storytellers (2009)	A Reality Tour (2010)	The Next Day (2013)

David Bowie live albums chronology
VH1 Storytellers (2009)	A Reality Tour (2010)	Live Nassau Coliseum '76 (2017)

Professional ratings
Aggregate scores
Source	Rating
Metacritic	68/100
Review scores
Source	Rating
Allmusic	3/5 stars
BBC Music	4/5 stars
Popmatters	7/10 stars
Q	3/5 stars
Rolling Stone	3.5/5 stars
The Telegraph	4/5 stars

A Reality Tour is a live album by David Bowie that was released on 25 January 2010. The album features 22 and 23 November 2003 performances in Dublin during his concert tour A Reality Tour. This is an audio version of the concert video of the same name, except that it adds three bonus tracks. The digital download on iTunes adds two more bonus tracks.

A newly remastered and resequenced version of the album was released on 12 September 2025 as part of the I Can't Give Everything Away (2002–2016) box set.

== Track listing ==
All songs written by David Bowie except where noted.

Disc one
No.	Title	Original Album	Length
1.	"Rebel Rebel"	Diamond Dogs (1974)	3:30
2.	"New Killer Star"	Reality (2003)	4:59
3.	"Reality"	Reality	5:08
4.	"Fame" (Bowie, John Lennon, Carlos Alomar)	Young Americans (1975)	4:12
5.	"Cactus" (Black Francis)	Heathen (2002)	3:01
6.	"Sister Midnight" (Bowie, Alomar, Iggy Pop)	The Idiot (by Iggy Pop (1977))	4:37
7.	"Afraid"	Heathen	3:28
8.	"All the Young Dudes"	All the Young Dudes (by Mott the Hoople (1972))	3:48
9.	"Be My Wife"	Low (1977)	3:15
10.	"The Loneliest Guy"	Reality	3:58
11.	"The Man Who Sold the World"	The Man Who Sold the World (1970)	4:18
12.	"Fantastic Voyage" (Bowie, Brian Eno)	Lodger (1979)	3:13
13.	"Hallo Spaceboy" (Bowie, Eno)	Outside (1995)	5:28
14.	"Sunday"	Heathen	7:56
15.	"Under Pressure" (Bowie, Freddie Mercury, John Deacon, Brian May, Roger Taylor)	Hot Space (by Queen (1982))	4:18
16.	"Life on Mars?"	Hunky Dory (1971)	4:40
17.	"Battle for Britain (The Letter)" (Bowie, Reeves Gabrels, Mark Plati)	Earthling (1997)	4:55

Disc two
No.	Title	Original Album	Length
1.	"Ashes to Ashes"	Scary Monsters (And Super Creeps) (1980)	5:46
2.	"The Motel"	Outside	5:44
3.	"Loving the Alien"	Tonight (1984)	5:17
4.	"Never Get Old"	Reality	4:18
5.	"Changes"	Hunky Dory	3:51
6.	"I'm Afraid of Americans" (Bowie, Eno)	Earthling	5:17
7.	"'Heroes'" (Bowie, Eno)	"Heroes" (1977)	6:58
8.	"Bring Me the Disco King"	Reality	7:56
9.	"Slip Away"	Heathen	5:56
10.	"Heathen (The Rays)"	Heathen	6:24
11.	"Five Years"	The Rise and Fall of Ziggy Stardust and the Spiders from Mars (1972)	4:19
12.	"Hang On to Yourself"	The Rise and Fall of Ziggy Stardust and the Spiders from Mars	2:50
13.	"Ziggy Stardust"	The Rise and Fall of Ziggy Stardust and the Spiders from Mars	3:44

CD bonus tracks
No.	Title	Original Album	Length
14.	"Fall Dog Bombs the Moon"	Reality	4:11
15.	"Breaking Glass" (Bowie, Dennis Davis, George Murray)	Low	2:27
16.	"China Girl" (Bowie, Pop)	Let's Dance (1983)	4:18

Digital Edition bonus tracks
No.	Title	Original Album	Length
14.	"5:15 The Angels Have Gone"	Heathen	5:22
15.	"Days"	Reality	3:25

== Personnel ==
- David Bowie – vocals, guitars, Stylophone, harmonica
- Earl Slick – guitar
- Gerry Leonard – guitar, backing vocals
- Gail Ann Dorsey – bass guitar, backing vocals, co-lead vocals on "Under Pressure"
- Sterling Campbell – drums
- Mike Garson – keyboards, piano
- Catherine Russell – keyboards, percussion, acoustic guitar, backing vocals

== Charts ==
Chart (2010–16)	Peak position
Australian Albums Chart	91
Austrian Albums Chart	18
Belgian (Wallonia) Albums Chart	18
Belgian (Flanders) Albums Chart	27
Dutch Albums Chart	57
French Albums (SNEP)	40
German Albums (Offizielle Top 100)	39
Irish Albums Chart	33
Italian Albums (FIMI)	55
Portuguese Albums Chart	24
Scottish Albums (OCC)	57
Swedish Albums (Sverigetopplistan)	56
Swiss Albums Chart	39
UK Albums Chart	53
US Billboard Current Albums	191

== Certifications ==
Region	Certification	Certified units/sales
Germany (BVMI)	Gold	100,000^{‡}
^{‡} Sales+streaming figures based on certification alone.
