= Underworld (2003 film) =

Action horror film by Len Wiseman

- Theatrical release poster
- Directed by: Len Wiseman
- Screenplay by: Danny McBride
- Story by: Kevin Grevioux; Len Wiseman; Danny McBride
- Produced by: Tom Rosenberg; Gary Lucchesi; Richard Wright
- Starring: Kate Beckinsale; Scott Speedman; Michael Sheen; Shane Brolly; Erwin Leder; Bill Nighy
- Cinematography: Tony Pierce-Roberts
- Edited by: Martin Hunter
- Music by: Paul Haslinger
- Production companies: Screen Gems; Lakeshore Entertainment
- Distributed by: Sony Pictures Releasing (North America, South Africa, Australia, New Zealand and Italy); Entertainment Film Distributors (United Kingdom); Concorde Filmverleih (Germany); SPI International (Hungary)
- Release dates: September 15, 2003 (Grauman's Chinese Theatre); September 19, 2003 (United States and United Kingdom); January 29, 2004 (Germany); April 22, 2004 (Hungary)
- Running time: 121 minutes
- Countries: Germany; Hungary; United Kingdom; United States
- Language: English
- Budget: $22 million
- Box office: $95.7 million

Underworld is a 2003 action horror film directed by Len Wiseman in his feature film directorial debut, from a screenplay by Danny McBride, based on a story by Kevin Grevioux, Wiseman, and McBride. The film stars Kate Beckinsale, Scott Speedman, Michael Sheen, Shane Brolly, Erwin Leder, and Bill Nighy. The plot centers on the secret history of vampires and lycans (an abbreviated form of lycanthrope, which means werewolf). The main plot revolves around Selene (Beckinsale), a vampire Death Dealer hunting Lycans. She finds herself attracted to a human, Michael Corvin (Speedman), who is being targeted by the Lycans. After Michael is bitten by a Lycan, Selene must decide whether to do her duty and kill him or go against her clan and save him.

Underworld premiered at the Grauman's Chinese Theatre in Los Angeles, California on September 15, 2003, and was released in the United States on September 19, by Sony Pictures Releasing under the Screen Gems banner. The film received generally mixed-to-negative reviews from critics. A surprise hit, the film grossed over $95 million worldwide against a production budget of $22 million and originated a franchise.

The film was followed by Underworld: Evolution in 2006.

== Plot ==
For generations, vampires and Lycans, an ancient species of werewolf, have secretly waged war. The vampires gain the upper hand when Lycan leader Lucian seemingly dies at the hands of vampire Kraven, who becomes the second-in-command to the vampires' leading elders. Selene, a member of an elite group of vampire assassins known as "Death Dealers", continues to pursue the extermination of the Lycans despite other vampires no longer perceiving them as a threat.

After a clash with the Lycans, Selene discovers that they are after Michael Corvin, a seemingly ordinary resident doctor. Disregarding Kraven’s insistence to ignore the situation, Selene privately investigates Michael. The pair is pursued by a group of Lycans led by Lucian, who manages to bite Michael during their escape. Since Kraven was the only witness to Lucian's supposed death, Selene begins to suspect that he lied about the death and may be working with the Lycans.

Selene prematurely awakens Viktor, a hibernating elder vampire and leaves to hide Michael in a safe house. Selene binds Michael, anticipating the Lycans' bite will transform him into a werewolf when the full moon rises. As the two of them bond, she gradually tells him more about her past, revealing that Viktor adopted her and turned her into a vampire after her family's death at the hands of Lycans, leading her to start a vengeful campaign against them, and that Michael's hallucinations are memories that Lucian passed down to him.

Selene returns to her coven's mansion. Furious about being woken early, Viktor refuses to believe Selene's warnings about Kraven's treachery and reminds her that his fellow elder Marcus was supposed to be awakened before him. Meanwhile, en route to the mansion to awaken Marcus, vampire elder Amelia, the coven's current ruler, is ambushed and killed by Lycans, who have tracked her with Kraven's assistance.

Selene escapes the mansion and abducts the Lycan scientist Singe, while the Lycans capture Michael. While held captive in the Lycans' lair, Michael soon learns that Lucian was once in love with Viktor's daughter Sonja. After he discovered their forbidden affair, Viktor murdered her. Lucian claims that Lycans were once slaves of vampires, and the war began when they rose up against them and fought for their freedom.

At the vampires' mansion, a captive Singe reveals that Selene was being honest about Kraven's betrayal, and he reveals why the Lycans want Michael: vampires and Lycans actually have a common ancestor, which Michael is a direct descendant of. As an heir to the legendary "Corvinus" bloodline, he carries a unique genetic strain that could allow him to become a vampire-werewolf hybrid, which Singe predicts will lack the weaknesses of both species. An angered Viktor then kills Singe and mobilizes the Death Dealers to raid the Lycan’s lair to kill the remaining Lycans, including Michael.

In the ensuing showdown between vampires and Lycans, Selene breaks into the Lycans' lair to rescue Michael. Kraven and Lucian turn on each other, and the former tells Selene that Viktor was the one who really murdered her family and only spared and mentored her due to being reminded of his daughter. Selene is forced to bite a fatally injured Michael, hoping to make him a vampire-werewolf hybrid, while Kraven shoots Lucian, killing him.

When Viktor arrives at the Lycans' lair after the battle, he admits to murdering Selene's parents and killing his daughter. He also insists that he killed Sonja for the good of his people and reveals she was pregnant with Lucian's child, an abomination in the eyes of the two species. Lastly, he claims that he made Selene immortal because he loved her and proceeds to fight the hybrid Michael. Initially overwhelmed by Michael’s strength, Viktor eventually gets the upper hand and attempts to strangle him. Selene rouses from her disorientation and kills Viktor by beheading him with his sword. Now enemies of both vampires and Lycans, Selene and Michael flee the Lycans' lair together.

Back at the vampires' mansion, Marcus, now the sole surviving vampire elder, awakens as a hybrid after Singe's blood seeps into his sarcophagus.

== Cast ==
- Kate Beckinsale as Selene, a Death Dealer
- Scott Speedman as Michael Corvin, a medical student who becomes a hybrid
- Bill Nighy as Viktor, the second most powerful of the vampire elders
- Michael Sheen as Lucian, the leader of the Lycans
- Shane Brolly as Kraven, a vampire noble who plots to kill the elders
- Erwin Leder as Singe, a Lycan scientist who plans with Lucian to make a hybrid creature
- Sophia Myles as Erika, a vampire courtesan who desires Kraven's favor
- Robbie Gee as Kahn, a vampire warrior who helps Selene
- Kevin Grevioux as Raze, Lucian's right-hand-man
- Zita Görög as Amelia, a vampire elder
- Scott McElroy as Soren, Kraven's henchman
- Wentworth Miller as Adam Lockwood, Michael's colleague
- Dennis Kozeluh as Dmitri
- Hank Amos as Nathaniel
- Sandor Bolla as Rigel
- Todd Schneider as Trix
- Jázmin Dammak as Sonja

== Production ==
=== Development ===
In 2000, Danny McBride met Len Wiseman through Nick Reed, who was the agent for both of them with intent for them to work together on a script the former wrote. While the plans for that film fizzled out, they did set out a plan to work together. Kevin Grevioux had graduated from Howard University with a degree in microbiology, but he developed a desire to study film in cinematography and screenwriting. He dropped out of graduate studies and moved to Los Angeles, where he became an actor. He came up with the original concept for the film and wrote the original screenplay, which was inspired by Romeo and Juliet alongside his college studies, which based vampirism and lycanthropy on a viral mutagen rather than mythology. McBride and Wiseman soon stepped in to work on the script, which they soon set out to make a trilogy of films. Each received credit for their work on the film, and Grevioux also appeared in the film as an actor.

=== Legal controversy ===
The film was the subject of a copyright infringement lawsuit filed by White Wolf, Inc. and Nancy A. Collins, claiming the setting was too similar to the Vampire: The Masquerade and Werewolf: The Apocalypse games, both set in the World of Darkness setting, and to the Sonja Blue vampire novels. White Wolf filed 17 counts of copyright infringement, and claimed over 80 points of unique similarity between White Wolf's gaming systems and the film. These included some general plot points like vampires having superhuman speed or being able to disappear, and more specific similarities like a vampire/werewolf hybrid being referred to as an “Abomination”. White Wolf, Inc. also said the script was very similar to a story entitled The Love of Monsters (1994), which they published, written by Nancy A. Collins. In September 2003, a judge granted White Wolf an expedited hearing. The lawsuit ended in a confidential settlement.

== Soundtrack ==
Underworld (Music from the Motion Picture)

Soundtrack album
- Released: 2003
- Length: 1:07:07
- Label: Lakeshore
- Producer: Danny Lohner

Professional ratings
Review scores
Source	Rating
Allmusic	3.5/5 stars

The film's soundtrack was produced by Danny Lohner and distributed via Roadrunner Records. Lohner (born 1970), a bass guitarist, guitarist, and keyboardist who has recorded with Nine Inch Nails and Marilyn Manson, contributed several songs to the soundtrack under the pseudonym Renholdër. Lohner included a song by Skinny Puppy, a Canadian industrial band; a song by The Dillinger Escape Plan, a US band which performs an aggressive, technical style of hardcore punk called mathcore; a song by US alternative rock/post-hardcore band Finch entitled "Worms of the Earth"; a song by The Icarus Line, a band known for its abrasive form of rock music; and Lisa Germano, an American singer/songwriter and multi-instrumentalist who specializes in alternative rock and dream pop.

Music critic Bill Aicher wrote that the "soundtrack follow[s] in a similar gothic vein" to the visuals, and stated that it "does an excellent job setting the dark mood" by using "a veritable who's who in the genre", with an "impressive array of metal, hard rock, industrial, and otherwise gothic-themed tracks". Aicher wrote that since "a majority of the selections [are] written, produced, or featuring Lohner, the album retains a sense of cohesion throughout, making it much more a complete product than has generally been the case with similarly-themed products." In particular, Aicher praised the rearrangement of David Bowie's "Bring Me the Disco King" (previously released in its original form on his studio album Reality earlier that month) as the soundtrack's strongest piece. This version of the song, which features Maynard James Keenan (from Tool and A Perfect Circle) and guitarist John Frusciante (of the Red Hot Chili Peppers), was praised by Aicher as "Dark, brooding, sad, and twitchy".

Track listing

No.	Title	Artist	Length
1.	"Awakening"	The Damning Well	4:15
2.	"Rev. 22:20"	Puscifer	4:39
3.	"Throwing Punches"	Page Hamilton	3:42
4.	"Rocket Collecting"	Milla Jovovich & Danny Lohner	5:42
5.	"Now I Know"	Renholdër & Amy Lee	0:57
6.	"Bring Me the Disco King" (Danny Lohner Mix)	David Bowie (featuring Maynard James Keenan & John Frusciante)	6:06
7.	"Optimissed"	Skinny Puppy	3:49
8.	"Down in the Lab"	Renholdër & Amy Lee	1:46
9.	"Judith" (Renholdër Mix)	A Perfect Circle	4:23
10.	"Suicide Note"	Johnette Napolitano	5:26
11.	"Baby's First Coffin"	The Dillinger Escape Plan	4:01
12.	"Hover" (Quiet Mix)	Trust Company	3:10
13.	"Falling Through the Sky"	Renholdër	1:01
14.	"Weak and Powerless" (Tilling My Grave Mix)	A Perfect Circle	3:02
15.	"Worms of the Earth"	Finch	2:35
16.	"From a Shell"	Lisa Germano	2:57
17.	"Death Dealer's Descent"	Renholdër	0:55
18.	"On the Lash"	The Icarus Line	4:04
19.	"All of This Past"	Sarah Bettens	4:28
Total length:			1:07:07

Underworld (Original Score)

Film score by Paul Haslinger
- Released: October 14, 2003
- Length: 52:20
- Label: Lakeshore Records
- Producers: Paul Haslinger and Lustmord

== Release ==
=== Box office ===
It opened at first place and earned $21 million during the opening weekend of September 19–21, 2003. The film grossed $51,970,690 in the US and $95,708,457 worldwide.

=== Reception ===
Underworld has a 30% overall approval rating on film-critics' aggregate site Rotten Tomatoes based on 161 reviews, with an average rating of 4.8/10. The site's consensus reads, "Though stylish to look at, Underworld is tedious and derivative." Metacritic, which uses a weighted average, assigned the film a score of 42 out of 100, based on 34 critics, indicating "mixed or average" reviews. Audiences polled by CinemaScore gave the film an average grade of "B+" on an A+ to F scale.

Roger Ebert said, "This is a movie so paltry in its characters and shallow in its story that the war seems to exist primarily to provide graphic visuals". However, some critics were more favorable: the New York Daily News praised it as being "stylish and cruel, and mightily entertaining for certain covens out there".

Salon reviewer Andrew O'Hehir gave a mixed review, stating, "by any reasonable standard, this dark vampire epic — all massive overacting, cologne-commercial design and sexy cat suits — sucks," but that "at least it gives a crap", conceding that despite the movie's flaws, the complex vampire-werewolf mythology backstory "has been meticulously worked out".

The film has since developed a strong cult following.

=== Accolades ===
Award	Subject	Nominee	Result
Saturn Awards	Best Horror Film		Nominated
Saturn Awards	Best Actress	Kate Beckinsale	Nominated
Saturn Awards	Best Make-Up	Trefor Proud and Balázs Novák	Nominated
Saturn Awards	Cinescape Genre Face of the Future Awards	Scott Speedman	Won
Teen Choice Awards	Choice Thriller Movie		Nominated
Teen Choice Awards	Choice Movie Actress: Drama/Action Adventure	Kate Beckinsale (also for Van Helsing)	Nominated

=== Home media ===
Underworld was released on DVD and VHS on January 6, 2004 by Columbia TriStar Home Entertainment.

== Sequels and prequel ==
A sequel, titled Underworld: Evolution, in which Marcus fully awakens, was released January 20, 2006. The prequel Underworld: Rise of the Lycans, which gives more detail about the creation of the Lycan species and Lucian's hatred, was released January 23, 2009. A second sequel, Underworld: Awakening, was released on January 20, 2012, and a third sequel, Underworld: Blood Wars, was released on January 6, 2017.

== Video game ==
To coincide with the film's release, Sony Pictures commissioned video game developer Black Widow Games to develop a promotional tie-in mod for the video game Half-Life titled Underworld: Bloodline. The mod was available on Sony Pictures' official website until the end of 2007. An asymmetric multiplayer FPS, the game tasks players with choosing between Vampires and Lycans, engaging in objective-based combat across urban maps. Each faction features distinct classes, weapons, and movement abilities, while gameplay revolves around capturing or defending Hybrid NPCs across four maps, blending mechanics inspired by Half-Life's mods Counter-Strike and Vampire Slayer. It is the only officially licensed Half-Life mod tied to a Hollywood movie.

== See also ==
- Vampire film
