= A Reality Tour =

2003–2004 concert tour by David Bowie

- Tour by David Bowie
- Promotional poster for the tour
- Location: Europe; North America; Oceania; Asia
- Associated album: Reality
- Start date: 7 October 2003
- End date: 25 June 2004
- Legs: 5
- No. of shows: 112 in total
- Box office: US$46 million

David Bowie concert chronology
- Heathen Tour (2002); A Reality Tour (2003–04)

A Reality Tour was a worldwide concert tour by the English singer-songwriter David Bowie in support of his 2003 album Reality. The tour began on 7 October 2003 at the Forum Copenhagen, Denmark, continuing through Europe, North America, Asia, including a return to New Zealand and Australia for the first time since the 1987 Glass Spider Tour. At over 110 shows, the tour was the longest tour of Bowie's career. A heart attack in late June 2004 forced the cancellation of some dates near the end of the tour. Bowie retired from performing live in 2006, making this tour his last.

The tour grossed US$46 million, making it the ninth-highest-grossing tour of 2004.

== Background ==
Bowie announced the tour in June 2003, intending to play to over a million people across 17 countries, and was billed as his first major tour since the Outside Tour of 1995. Rehearsals for the tour begin in July, with the band from his previous Heathen Tour mostly unchanged; Mark Plati had other work booked, so guitarist Gerry Leonard was made the new bandleader. The band played a warm-up gig on 19 August in New York to an audience of about 500 people at The Chance theater. Starting in September, Bowie appeared on national radio and TV shows in Germany and France before doing a "live and interactive music event" staged in London on 8 September, one of the first live streams of a rock concert, and the first to be broadcast in 5.1 sound. This show was beamed live to audiences around the world, although some countries (such as the Japan and Australia) didn't broadcast the show until the following day, and some countries (like the US) did not broadcast the show until a week later. Some theaters report not receiving the center channel of audio of the show, meaning that some audiences didn't hear Bowie's singing as part of the broadcast (strictly an issue at the theaters' end, according to Tony Visconti, who was responsible for the mix).

Bowie continued publicity for the album and tour, playing songs on shows such as Friday Night with Jonathan Ross on BBC One, The Today Show, Last Call with Carson Daly, and The Late Show with David Letterman. Tracks performed during these shows included "New Killer Star", "Modern Love", "Never Get Old", and "Hang On to Yourself". Finally, in late September, Bowie and the band played songs for AOL Online, performing "New Killer Star", "I'm Afraid of Americans", "Rebel Rebel", "Days" and "Fall Dog Bombs the Moon", all of which were streamed to AOL customers over the next few months. By the end of September, Bowie and band were in Brussels for final rehearsals.

== Tour design ==
The tour itself was described by Bowie biographer Nicholas Pegg as "in some respects [...] even more theatrical" than the "Sound+Vision Tour", one of Bowie's more theatrical undertakings. The stage included a giant LED screen with a raised catwalk, multiple platforms pushing out into the audience, staircases and "huge, bleached white tree branches" that dangled "gracefully from either side of the stage". Bowie himself helped design the stage alongside designer Therese Depreze, lighting designer Tom Kenny and visual director Laura Frank.

== Repertoire ==
The set list included tracks spanning Bowie's 30 plus years in the music business, from The Man Who Sold the World (1970) all the way to Reality (2003), along with collaborations such as "Sister Midnight" (originally from The Idiot (1977) by Iggy Pop) and "Under Pressure" (released as a single (1981) by Bowie and Queen later found on Hot Space released the following year), and snippets and teasers of Bowie classics such as "Space Oddity" and "Golden Years". The band had rehearsed around 60 songs for the tour, and the large repertoire of available songs allowed them to change the setlist from night to night, sometimes making up the setlist on the fly, a departure from some of Bowie's previous and heavily choreographed tours like the Serious Moonlight Tour of 1983, the Glass Spider Tour of 1987, and the Sound+Vision Tour of 1990. Bowie and his band played over two hours every night of the tour, playing more than 30 songs at some venues. One song that was rehearsed but not performed is "Win" from his 1974 album Young Americans; it never made it further than the occasional soundcheck for the tour.

== Reception ==
The 24 January 2004 show in Vancouver, Canada was reviewed positively, with the reviewer saying that "with Bowie's near-flawless vocals, brilliant band, and smartly executed show, you wind up with one of the finest old-school rock gigs the Canucks’ home rink has ever hosted." The review of the next show in Seattle on 25 January 2004 was similarly positive, saying Bowie, "still every inch a superstar ... still oozes charm and sex appeal" and called the setlist a "celebration of his whole body of work." In Las Vegas's The Joint at the (now former) Hard Rock Hotel, a review of the 6 February 2004 show there described Bowie as he "laughed and joked around between songs" to a crowd "dancing ... in the aisles" in an overall positive review.

== Tour incidents ==
On 6 May 2004, a performance at the James L. Knight Center, Miami, Florida was cancelled after lighting technician Walter "Wally Gator" Thomas fell to his death prior to Bowie going onstage. At the show in Oslo on 18 June 2004, Bowie was struck in the left eye with a lollipop thrown by an audience member.

=== Heart attack ===
On 23 June, while on stage in Prague for the tour, Bowie had a heart attack (misdiagnosed at the time as a pinched nerve), which required him to leave the stage (and finally end the show early) to receive medical attention. The tour was officially curtailed after the Hurricane Festival performance in Scheeßel, Germany on 25 June 2004, as a result of continued discomfort. On 30 June, the tour was officially cancelled after Bowie was diagnosed with an acutely blocked artery that required an angioplasty procedure (performed on 26 June).

== Live recordings ==
A DVD video of the Point Theatre, Dublin performances of 2003 was released as A Reality Tour in 2004. A CD of the same performances was released as A Reality Tour in 2010.

== Tour dates ==
List of 2003 concerts:
Date	City	Country	Venue	Tickets sold / available	Revenue	Opening act
7 October	Copenhagen	Denmark	Forum Copenhagen	—N/a	—N/a	The Dandy Warhols
8 October	Stockholm	Sweden	Globen Arena	—N/a	—N/a	The Dandy Warhols
10 October	Helsinki	Finland	Hartwall Areena	—N/a	—N/a	The Dandy Warhols
12 October	Oslo	Norway	Oslo Spektrum	—N/a	—N/a	The Dandy Warhols
15 October	Rotterdam	Netherlands	Rotterdam Ahoy	—N/a	—N/a	The Dandy Warhols
16 October	Hamburg	Germany	Color Line Arena	—N/a	—N/a	The Dandy Warhols
18 October	Frankfurt	Germany	Festhalle Frankfurt	—N/a	—N/a	The Dandy Warhols
20 October	Paris	France	Palais Omnisports de Paris-Bercy	—N/a	—N/a	The Dandy Warhols
21 October	Paris	France	Palais Omnisports de Paris-Bercy	—N/a	—N/a	The Dandy Warhols
23 October	Milan	Italy	Forum di Assago	—N/a	—N/a	The Dandy Warhols
24 October	Zürich	Switzerland	Hallenstadion	—N/a	—N/a	The Dandy Warhols
26 October	Stuttgart	Germany	Hanns-Martin-Schleyer-Halle	—N/a	—N/a	The Dandy Warhols
27 October	Munich	Germany	Olympiahalle	—N/a	—N/a	The Dandy Warhols
29 October	Vienna	Austria	Wiener Stadthalle	—N/a	—N/a	The Dandy Warhols
31 October	Cologne	Germany	Kölnarena	—N/a	—N/a	The Dandy Warhols
1 November	Hanover	Germany	Preussag Arena	10,587 / 10,587	$499,926	The Dandy Warhols
3 November	Berlin	Germany	Max-Schmeling-Halle	10,693 / 10,693	$512,787	The Dandy Warhols
5 November	Antwerp	Belgium	Sportpaleis	16,113 / 16,113	$690,217	The Dandy Warhols
7 November	Lille	France	Zénith de Lille	6,986 / 6,986	$349,420	The Dandy Warhols
8 November	Amnéville	France	Galaxie Amnéville	10,960 / 11,200	$462,161	The Dandy Warhols
10 November	Nice	France	Palais Nikaïa	7,620 / 8,000	$426,823	The Dandy Warhols
14 November	Marseille	France	Le Dôme de Marseille	8,004 / 8,004	$440,087	The Dandy Warhols
15 November	Lyon	France	Halle Tony Garnier	17,000 / 17,000	$753,371	The Dandy Warhols
17 November	Manchester	England	Manchester Evening News Arena	14,827 / 14,827	$1,094,747	The Dandy Warhols
19 November	Birmingham	England	NEC LG Arena	23,604 / 23,604	$1,759,705	The Dandy Warhols
20 November	Birmingham	England	NEC LG Arena	23,604 / 23,604	$1,759,705	The Dandy Warhols
22 November	Dublin	Ireland	Point Theatre	17,000 / 17,000	$1,142,076	The Dandy Warhols
23 November	Dublin	Ireland	Point Theatre	17,000 / 17,000	$1,142,076	The Dandy Warhols
25 November	London	England	Wembley Arena	23,048 / 23,048	$1,717,549	The Dandy Warhols
26 November	London	England	Wembley Arena	23,048 / 23,048	$1,717,549	The Dandy Warhols
28 November	Glasgow	Scotland	Scottish Exhibition and Conference Centre	10,103 / 10,103	$768,886	The Dandy Warhols
13 December	Montreal	Canada	Bell Centre	11,315 / 11,315	$613,650	Macy Gray
15 December	New York City	United States	Madison Square Garden	13,752 / 13,752	$1,108,711	Macy Gray
16 December	Uncasville	United States	Mohegan Sun Arena	6,698 / 6,698	$313,460	Macy Gray
20 December	Nassau	Bahamas	The Atlantis Paradise Island Hotel	—N/a	—N/a	—N/a

List of 2004 concerts:
Date	City	Country	Venue	Tickets sold / available	Revenue	Opening act
7 January	Cleveland	United States	CSU Convocation Center	7,692 / 7,938	$336,940	Macy Gray
9 January	Auburn Hills	United States	The Palace of Auburn Hills	8,509 / 8,909	$427,522	Macy Gray
11 January	Minneapolis	United States	Target Center	5,492 / 7,505	$275,436	Macy Gray
13 January	Rosemont	United States	Rosemont Theatre	12,867 / 12,867	$959,883	Macy Gray
14 January	Rosemont	United States	Rosemont Theatre	12,867 / 12,867	$959,883	Macy Gray
16 January	Rosemont	United States	Rosemont Theatre	12,867 / 12,867	$959,883	Macy Gray
19 January	Denver	United States	Fillmore Auditorium	3,600 / 3,600	$237,600	Macy Gray
21 January	Calgary	Canada	Pengrowth Saddledome	11,474 / 11,474	$634,074	Macy Gray
24 January	Vancouver	Canada	GM Place	11,617 / 11,617	$612,323	Macy Gray
25 January	Seattle	United States	Paramount Theatre	2,804 / 2,835	$199,722	Macy Gray
27 January	San Jose	United States	HP Pavilion	9,856 / 10,317	$578,128	Macy Gray
30 January	Las Vegas	United States	The Joint	1,522 / 1,522	$343,313	Macy Gray
31 January	Los Angeles	United States	Shrine Auditorium	12,348 / 12,348	$803,544	Macy Gray
2 February	Los Angeles	United States	Shrine Auditorium	12,348 / 12,348	$803,544	Macy Gray
3 February	Los Angeles	United States	Wiltern Theatre	2,290 / 2,290	$187,174	Macy Gray
5 February	Phoenix	United States	Dodge Theater	4,873 / 4,873	$237,842	Macy Gray
6 February	Las Vegas	United States	The Joint	1,522 / 1,522	$343,313	Macy Gray
7 February	Los Angeles	United States	Wiltern Theatre	2,290 / 2,290	$187,174	Macy Gray
14 February	Wellington	New Zealand	Westpac Stadium	—N/a	—N/a	Brooke Fraser
17 February	Brisbane	Australia	Brisbane Entertainment Centre	—N/a	—N/a	Something for Kate
20 February	Sydney	Australia	Sydney Entertainment Centre	—N/a	—N/a	Something for Kate
21 February	Sydney	Australia	Sydney Entertainment Centre	—N/a	—N/a	Something for Kate
23 February	Adelaide	Australia	Adelaide Entertainment Centre	—N/a	—N/a	Something for Kate
26 February	Melbourne	Australia	Rod Laver Arena	—N/a	—N/a	Something for Kate
27 February	Melbourne	Australia	Rod Laver Arena	—N/a	—N/a	Something for Kate
1 March	Perth	Australia	Supreme Court Gardens	—N/a	—N/a	Something for Kate
4 March	Singapore		Singapore Indoor Stadium	—N/a	—N/a	N/A
8 March	Tokyo	Japan	Nippon Budokan	—N/a	—N/a	N/A
9 March	Tokyo	Japan	Nippon Budokan	—N/a	—N/a	N/A
11 March	Osaka	Japan	Osaka-jo Hall	—N/a	—N/a	Kiyoharu
14 March	Hong Kong		Hong Kong Convention and Exhibition Centre	—N/a	—N/a	N/A
29 March (Note: The concert on 29 March 2004 in Atlantic City was originally scheduled to take place on 10 December 2003.)	Philadelphia	United States	Wachovia Center	10,761 / 18,000	$645,380	Stereophonics
30 March (Note: The concert on 30 March 2004 in Boston was originally scheduled to take place on 9 December 2003.)	Boston	United States	FleetCenter	—N/a	—N/a	Stereophonics
1 April (Note: The concert on 1 April 2004 in Toronto was originally scheduled to take place on 12 December 2003.)	Toronto	Canada	Air Canada Centre	13,893 / 14,114	$771,136	Stereophonics
2 April	Ottawa	Canada	Corel Centre	—N/a	—N/a	Stereophonics
4 April	Quebec City	Canada	Colisée Pepsi	—N/a	—N/a	Stereophonics
7 April	Winnipeg	Canada	Winnipeg Arena	—N/a	—N/a	Stereophonics
9 April	Edmonton	Canada	Rexall Place	8,507 / 9,404	$342,609	Stereophonics
11 April	Kelowna	Canada	Skyreach Place	—N/a	—N/a	Stereophonics
13 April	Portland	United States	Rose Garden Arena	—N/a	—N/a	Stereophonics
14 April	Seattle	United States	KeyArena	6,065 / 6,500	$316,094	Stereophonics
16 April	Berkeley	United States	Berkeley Community Theatre	—N/a	—N/a	Stereophonics
17 April	Berkeley	United States	Berkeley Community Theatre	—N/a	—N/a	Stereophonics
19 April	Santa Barbara	United States	Santa Barbara Bowl	4,546 / 4,562	$314,625	Stereophonics
22 April	Los Angeles	United States	Greek Theatre	5,764 / 5,764	$360,560	Stereophonics
23 April	Anaheim	United States	Arrowhead Pond	7,015 / 7,520	$498,218	Stereophonics
25 April	Loveland	United States	Budweiser Events Center	4,177 / 5,440	$262,503	Stereophonics
27 April	Austin	United States	The Backyard Amphitheater	—N/a	—N/a	Stereophonics
29 April	The Woodlands	United States	Cynthia Woods Mitchell Pavilion	—N/a	—N/a	Stereophonics
30 April	New Orleans	United States	Saenger Theatre	—N/a	—N/a	Stereophonics
5 May	Tampa	United States	Tampa Bay Performing Arts Center	—N/a	—N/a	The Polyphonic Spree
8 May	Atlanta	United States	Chastain Park Amphitheater	—N/a	—N/a	The Polyphonic Spree
10 May	Kansas City	United States	Starlight Theatre	—N/a	—N/a	The Polyphonic Spree
11 May	St. Louis	United States	Fox Theatre	—N/a	—N/a	The Polyphonic Spree
13 May	Hershey	United States	Star Pavilion	—N/a	—N/a	The Polyphonic Spree
14 May	London	Canada	John Labatt Centre	8,513 / 8,513	$446,740	The Polyphonic Spree
16 May (Note: The concert on 16 May 2004 in Fairfax was originally scheduled to take place on 7 December 2003.)	Fairfax	United States	Patriot Center	—N/a	—N/a	The Polyphonic Spree
17 May	Pittsburgh	United States	Benedum Center	—N/a	—N/a	The Polyphonic Spree
19 May	Milwaukee	United States	Milwaukee Theatre	—N/a	—N/a	The Polyphonic Spree
20 May	Indianapolis	United States	Murat Shrine	—N/a	—N/a	The Polyphonic Spree
22 May	Moline	United States	The MARK of the Quad Cities	—N/a	—N/a	The Polyphonic Spree
24 May	Columbus	United States	Columbus Veterans Memorial Auditorium	—N/a	—N/a	The Polyphonic Spree
25 May	Buffalo	United States	Shea's Performing Arts Center	—N/a	—N/a	The Polyphonic Spree
27 May	Scranton	United States	Ford Pavilion at Montage Mountain	—N/a	—N/a	The Polyphonic Spree
29 May (Note: The concert on 29 May 2004 in Atlantic City was originally scheduled to take place on 6 December 2003.)	Atlantic City	United States	Borgata Event Center	—N/a	—N/a	The Polyphonic Spree
30 May	Atlantic City	United States	Borgata Event Center	—N/a	—N/a	The Polyphonic Spree
1 June	Manchester	United States	Verizon Wireless Arena	—N/a	—N/a	The Polyphonic Spree
2 June	Uncasville	United States	Mohegan Sun Arena	—N/a	—N/a	The Polyphonic Spree
4 June	Wantagh	United States	Tommy Hilfiger at Jones Beach Theatre	—N/a	—N/a	The Polyphonic Spree
5 June	Holmdel	United States	PNC Bank Arts Center	—N/a	—N/a	The Polyphonic Spree
11 June	Amsterdam	Netherlands	Amsterdam Arena	—N/a	—N/a	–
13 June (Note: The concert on 13 June 2004 in Newport was part of the Isle of Wight Festival.)	Newport	England	Seaclose Park	—N/a	—N/a	–
17 June (Note: The concert on 17 June 2004 in Bergen was part of the Bergen Festival.)	Bergen	Norway	Koengen	—N/a	—N/a	–
18 June (Note: The concert on 18 June 2004 in Oslo was part of the Norwegian Wood Festival.)	Oslo	Norway	Frognerbadet	—N/a	—N/a	–
20 June (Note: The concert on 20 June 2004 in Seinäjoki was part of Provinssirock.)	Seinäjoki	Finland	Törnävänsaari	—N/a	—N/a	–
23 June	Prague	Czech Republic	T-Mobile Arena	—N/a	—N/a	–
25 June (Note: The concert on 25 June 2004 in Scheeßel was part of the Hurricane Festival. This was also the final David Bowie concert as part of a headlining tour.)	Scheeßel	Germany	Eichenring	—N/a	—N/a	–
Total				722,158 / 737,581	$45,395,490	

- On 19 August 2003 Bowie performed a one-off show in Poughkeepsie, New York at The Chance, as a warm up show.
- On 8 September 2003 Bowie performed a show at the Riverside Studios in London, and the live performance was beamed via satellite to cinemas and theatres across Europe and, due to time delay, the following day across Asia, Australia, North and South America.

Notes

Cancellations and rescheduled shows

List of cancelled concerts
Date	City	Country	Venue	Reason
12 November 2003	Toulouse	France	Le Zénith de Toulouse	Laryngitis
6 May 2004	Miami	United States	James L. Knight Center	Accident
26 June 2004	Tuttlingen	Germany	Southside Festival	Health concerns
29 June 2004	Vienna	Austria	Schloss Schönbrunn	Health concerns
30 June 2004	Salzburg	Austria	Residenzplatz	Health concerns
2 July 2004	Roskilde	Denmark	Roskilde Festival	Health concerns
4 July 2004	Werchter	Belgium	Rock Werchter	Health concerns
6 July 2004	Ile De Gaou	France	Festival de la Gaou	Health concerns
7 July 2004	Carcassonne	France	Festival de la Cite	Health concerns
10 July 2004	Kinross	Scotland	Balado, T in the Park	Health concerns
11 July 2004	County Kildare	Ireland	Oxegen Festival	Health concerns
14 July 2004	Bilbao	Spain	Bilbao Festival	Health concerns
16 July 2004	Compostela	Spain	Xacobeo Festival	Health concerns
17 July 2004	Porto	Portugal	The Dragon Festival	Health concerns
20 July 2004	Nyon	Switzerland	Paléo Festival Nyon	Health concerns
21 July 2004	Monte Carlo	Monaco	Club du Sporting	Health concerns
23 July 2004	Carhaix	France	Vieilles Charrues Festival	Health concerns

== Tour band ==
- David Bowie – vocals, guitars, stylophone, harmonica
- Earl Slick – guitar
- Gerry Leonard – guitar, backing vocals, music director
- Gail Ann Dorsey – bass guitar, vocals
- Sterling Campbell – drums
- Mike Garson – keyboards, piano
- Catherine Russell – keyboards, percussion, guitar, backing vocals

== Songs ==
Notation:

- ^{DVD/CD} Included on A Reality Tour (film) and A Reality Tour (live album)
- ^{CD} Included on the live album
- ^{iTunes} Available as Digital download bonus tracks (iTunes) for the live album

From The Man Who Sold the World

- "The Man Who Sold the World" ^{DVD/CD}
- "The Supermen"

From Hunky Dory

- "Changes" ^{DVD/CD}
- "Life on Mars?" ^{DVD/CD}
- "Quicksand"
- "The Bewlay Brothers"
- "Queen Bitch"

From The Rise and Fall of Ziggy Stardust and the Spiders from Mars

- "Five Years" ^{DVD/CD}
- "Starman"
- "Hang On to Yourself" ^{DVD/CD}
- "Ziggy Stardust" ^{DVD/CD}
- "Suffragette City"

From Aladdin Sane

- "Panic in Detroit"
- "The Jean Genie"

From Diamond Dogs

- "Diamond Dogs"
- "Rebel Rebel" ^{DVD/CD}

From Young Americans

- "Fame" ^{DVD/CD} (Bowie, John Lennon, Carlos Alomar)

From Station to Station

- "Station to Station"

From Low

- "Breaking Glass" ^{CD} (Bowie, Dennis Davis, George Murray)
- "Sound and Vision"
- "Always Crashing in the Same Car"
- "Be My Wife" ^{DVD/CD}
- "A New Career in a New Town"

From "Heroes"

- "'Heroes'" ^{DVD/CD} (Bowie, Brian Eno)

From Lodger

- "Fantastic Voyage" ^{DVD/CD} (Bowie, Eno)

From Scary Monsters (and Super Creeps)

- "Ashes to Ashes" ^{DVD/CD}
- "Fashion"

From Let's Dance

- "Modern Love"
- "China Girl" ^{CD} written by Iggy Pop and Bowie)
- "Let's Dance"

From Tonight

- "Loving the Alien" ^{DVD/CD}
- "Blue Jean"

From Outside

- "Hallo Spaceboy" ^{DVD/CD} (Bowie, Eno)
- "The Motel" (Bowie, Eno) ^{DVD/CD}

From Earthling

- "Battle for Britain (The Letter)" ^{DVD/CD} (Bowie, Reeves Gabrels, Mark Plati)
- "I'm Afraid of Americans" ^{DVD/CD} (Bowie, Eno)

From Heathen

- "Sunday" ^{DVD/CD}
- "Cactus" ^{DVD/CD} (written by Black Francis)
- "Slip Away" ^{DVD/CD}
- "Afraid" ^{DVD/CD}
- "I've Been Waiting for You" (originally from Neil Young (1968) by Neil Young; written by Young)
- "5:15 the Angels Have Gone" ^{iTunes}
- "Heathen (The Rays)" ^{DVD/CD}

From Reality

- "New Killer Star" ^{DVD/CD}
- "Pablo Picasso" (written by Jonathan Richman)
- "Never Get Old" ^{DVD/CD}
- "The Loneliest Guy" ^{DVD/CD}
- "Looking for Water"
- "She'll Drive the Big Car"
- "Days" ^{iTunes}
- "Fall Dog Bombs the Moon" ^{CD}
- "Try Some, Buy Some" (written by George Harrison)
- "Reality" ^{DVD/CD}
- "Bring Me the Disco King" ^{DVD/CD} (originally written and recorded for Black Tie White Noise (1993) and recorded once again for Earthling (1997))

Other songs:

- "A Hard Day's Night" ^{Snippet} (from A Hard Day's Night (1964) by The Beatles; written by Lennon and Paul McCartney)
- "All the Young Dudes" ^{DVD/CD} (from All the Young Dudes (1972) by Mott the Hoople; written by Bowie)
- "Bang a Gong (Get It On)" ^{Snippet} (from Electric Warrior (1971) by T.Rex; written by Marc Bolan)
- "Do You Know the Way to San José" ^{Snippet} (from Dionne Warwick in Valley of the Dolls (1968) by Dionne Warwick; written by Burt Bacharach and Hal David)
- "Here Comes the Sun" ^{Snippet} (from Abbey Road (1969) by The Beatles; written by Harrison)
- "It Can't Happen Here" (from Freak Out! ^{Snippet} (1966) by The Mothers of Invention; written by Frank Zappa)
- "Liza Jane" (Bowie's first ever single, released under the name "Davie Jones and the King Bees" in 1964; written by Leslie Conn)
- "Puppet on a String" ^{Snippet} (a single released for the 1967 Eurovision Song Contest by its winner Sandie Shaw; written by Bill Martin and Phil Coulter)
- "Rumble" ^{Snippet} (a single released in 1958 by Link Wray & His Ray Men; written by Milt Grant and Link Wray)
- "Sister Midnight" ^{DVD/CD} (from The Idiot by Iggy Pop, written by Pop, Bowie and Alomar)
- "Song 2" ^{Snippet} (from Blur (1997) by Blur; written by Damon Albarn, Graham Coxon, Alex James and Dave Rowntree)
- "Summertime" ^{Snippet} (from the opera Porgy and Bess (1935); written by George Gershwin, DuBose Heyward, Dorothy Heyward and Ira Gershwin)
- "Under Pressure" ^{DVD/CD} (a single released in 1981 by Bowie and Queen later found on Hot Space released the following year; written by Bowie, John Deacon, Brian May, Freddie Mercury, Roger Taylor)
- "White Light/White Heat" (from White Light/White Heat (1968) by The Velvet Underground; written by Lou Reed)
- "Y.M.C.A." ^{Snippet} (from Cruisin' by Village People, written by Henri Belolo, Jacques Morali and Victor Willis)
