= The Loneliest Guy =

2003 song performed by David Bowie

Song by David Bowie

from the album Reality
- Released: 2003
- Recorded: The Looking Glass Studios, New York City
- Genre: Rock
- Length: 4:11
- Label: Iso/Columbia
- Songwriter: David Bowie
- Producers: David Bowie, Tony Visconti

"The Loneliest Guy" is a song written by David Bowie in 2003 for his album Reality. It's a slow-tempo minimalistic piece in which, according to James E. Perone, "Bowie's character also lives in denial: in spite of the shards of glass that he finds near his windows, the solitary life he lives, and 'all the pages that have turned,' he expresses the belief that he is not 'the loneliest guy' in the world, but, rather, 'the luckiest guy'." The biographer also writes: "The slow, solemn pace of the piece, the long phrases sung with a slowly pulsing vibrato suggest a profound sadness."

The piano is played by long-time Bowie pianist Mike Garson in a sombre form that led David Buckley to make an analogy with the "psychotic menage" of Bowie's Outside (1995), although the biographer concludes: "Bowie's vocal, quivering and unstable, is just too much. As music writer Alex Petridis put it, the song was sadly 'overcooked'."

Lou Reed praised the song, writing for Rolling Stone: "He's always changing, so you never get tired of what he's doing. And I mean all the way up to his later records: 'The Loneliest Guy' on his album Reality is a great song. Yet another one." Margaret Cho also wrote in her compilation of essays and prose I Have Chosen to Stay and Fight (2005) that she likes many Bowie songs, "and the new songs from the Reality album, a new favorite being 'The Loneliest Guy.' It's almost too much to ask for, the ageless, timeless, faultless, flawless Bowie in a vocal storm of versatility [...]"

== Live versions ==
- It was played during A Reality Tour.
- A live version recorded at the Riverside Studios, Hammersmith, London, 8 September 2003 was released on the Tour Edition of Reality.
- Another version recorded live during Bowie's concerts at The Point, Dublin, Ireland, 22 and 23 November 2003, was released on the live DVD A Reality Tour and included in the corresponding album, A Reality Tour.
- it was played during Bowie's 2003 Isle of Wight set which has been shown on Sky Arts

== Personnel ==
According to Chris O'Leary:

- David Bowie – vocals, synthesizers
- David Torn – guitar
- Mike Garson – piano, keyboards
- Tony Visconti – bass
- Sterling Campbell – drums

Production

- David Bowie – producer
- Tony Visconti – producer, engineer
- Mario J. McNulty – engineer
