= Rebel Never Gets Old =

Song by David Bowie

Single by David Bowie
- Released: May 2004 (download) / June 2004 (single)
- Recorded: Looking Glass Studios, New York City
- Genre: Rock, Mashup
- Label: Columbia/ISO Records; COL 674971
- Producer(s): David Bowie, Tony Visconti, Mark Vidler/Go Home Productions (GHP)

David Bowie singles chronology
"Never Get Old" (2003)	"Rebel Never Gets Old" (2004)	"Golden Years (David Bowie vs KCRW)" (2011)

"Rebel Never Gets Old" is a mash-up of the songs "Rebel Rebel" and "Never Get Old", where the two songs are mixed into each other, produced by producer Mark Vidler, also known as Go Home Productions. This was Bowie's last single release (barring remixes and remasters) for nearly 10 years, until 2013's "Where Are We Now?".

== Background, release and promotion ==
Bowie had released his album Reality in late 2003, and to support an advertising campaign with Audi of America, had Vidler produce several mixes of "Rebel Never Gets Old" for the commercial, Internet download, and a single release. The download was made available in May 2004, followed by the single release in June, and was included with some copies of Reality in Europe in 2004. The single peaked at #47 in the UK charts in June 2004. As part of the advertising campaign, an online competition invited contestants to create their own mash-ups from select Bowie songs (some from Reality and some from his past repertoire); the winner mashed up "Shake It" with "She'll Drive the Big Car" and won a new Audi as a result.

== Track listing ==
=== CD: ISO-Columbia / COL 674971 (EU) ===
1. "Rebel Never Gets Old" (Radio Mix) 3:25
2. "Rebel Never Gets Old" (7th Heaven Edit) 4:17
3. "Rebel Never Gets Old" (7th Heaven Mix) 7:22
4. "Days" (Album version) 3:19
