= Fall Dog Bombs the Moon =

Song by David Bowie

from the album Reality
- Released: 15 September 2003
- Recorded: January–May 2003
- Studio: Looking Glass (New York City)
- Genre: Alternative rock
- Length: 4:04
- Label: ISO/Columbia
- Songwriter: David Bowie
- Producers: David Bowie, Tony Visconti

"Fall Dog Bombs the Moon" is a song written by David Bowie in 2003 for his album Reality. According to Bowie himself at the time of the album release, "It came from reading an article about Kellogg Brown & Root, a subsidiary of Halliburton, the company that Dick Cheney used to run. Basically, Kellogg Brown & Root got the job of cleaning up Iraq. What tends to happen is that a thing like an issue or a policy manifests itself as a guide. It becomes a character of some kind, like the one in Fall Dog. There's this guy saying, 'I'm goddamn rich'. You know, 'Throw anything you like at me, baby, because I'm goddamn rich. It doesn't bother me.'."

Biographer Nicholas Pegg wrote his own interpretation of the song: "The key on this occasion is the fearful predicament of global politics at the time of the Reality sessions. The album was recorded during the preamble to, and the prosecution of, the Iraq War, and it's impossible to hear lyrics like 'I don't care much, I'll win anyway.../I'm goddamn rich, an exploding man/When I talk in the night, there's oil on my hands' without pondering their most obvious resonance. It wouldn't be particularly extravagant to surmise that the 'Moon' of the title suggests the Crescent Moon of Islam, thereby narrowing down the candidates for 'Fall Dog' fairly decisively."

Pegg concludes writing that the song cocks a "contemptuous snook at the increasing predilection of political parties to find 'someone to hate' while jumping into bed with business corporations" and that dialogue with other Bowie's songs like "Fantastic Voyage", "Loving the Alien" and "I'm Afraid of Americans".

"Fall Dog Bombs the Moon" is based on short melodic motifs, the kind that seemed to permeate his previous album, Heathen.

A live performance of the song, recorded in November 2003 during the A Reality Tour, is included on the A Reality Tour album, released in 2010.

== Personnel ==
According to Chris O'Leary:

- David Bowie – lead and backing vocals, rhythm guitar, keyboards
- Earl Slick – guitar
- David Torn – guitar
- Mark Plati – guitar
- Tony Visconti – bass
- Mario J. McNulty – drums, percussion

Production

- David Bowie – producer
- Tony Visconti – producer, engineer
- Mario J. McNulty – engineer

== See also ==
- List of anti-war songs
