= A Reality Tour (film) =

Video by David Bowie
- Released: 19 October 2004
- Recorded: 22–23 November 2003
- Venue: Point Theatre (Dublin)
- Genre: Rock
- Length: 145:42
- Label: Columbia

David Bowie chronology
| Best of Bowie (2002) | A Reality Tour (2004) | VH1 Storytellers (2009) |

A Reality Tour is a DVD released in 2004 of David Bowie's performance at Point Theatre in Dublin, Ireland in 2003 during the A Reality Tour.

== Repertoire ==
The set list includes tracks spanning Bowie's 30 plus years in the music business, from The Man Who Sold the World (1970) all the way to Reality (2003), along with collaborations such as "Sister Midnight" (with Iggy Pop; originally from The Idiot (1977)) and "Under Pressure" (with Queen; released as a single in 1981 and later found on Hot Space the following year). There is a bit more focus, however, on tracks from the albums released since the Earthling World Tour in 1997, Heathen (2002), and Reality, whose tracks constitute 10 of the 30 songs performed.

Albums with no appearance included the cover album Pin Ups (1973), Never Let Me Down (1987), the albums produced with the band Tin Machine (Tin Machine (1989) and Tin Machine II (1991)), and Black Tie White Noise (1993). Aladdin Sane (1973) also made no concert appearance in the video, although songs from the album appeared on the tour.

A notable inclusion into the performance was the set of three songs from The Rise and Fall of Ziggy Stardust and the Spiders from Mars (1972) as the final encore. Though Bowie had performed the pieces many times through his career, the pieces had not been toured since 1978 when the live interpretations were featured on the Stage album released that same year.

The interpretations presented often a heavier and more complex sound than those of the album releases to suit the band for which the Reality album had been written; a more dynamic "Rebel Rebel" which later saw a release as a bonus track was arranged as an opener which included notably some audience participation and Bowie finishing his performance with the Irish phrase "Tiocfaidh ár lá", which means "Our day will come". Use of audience vocals appear in a number of tunes, including "All the Young Dudes" (from All the Young Dudes (1972) by Mott the Hoople; recorded for the Aladdin Sane album in 1972 and released in mono sound on The Best of David Bowie 1969/1974 (1997); won't see a stereo release until the 2014 album Nothing Has Changed, in which Bowie's voice was somewhat out of range to sing the chorus, and "Life on Mars?", which the audience faithfully sang along to.

== Track listing ==
The track listing for this concert by DVD chapter is as follows (NOTE: All songs are written by David Bowie except where noted.):

1. "Concert Introduction" – 2:42
2. "Rebel Rebel" (from Diamond Dogs, 1974) – 3:25
3. "New Killer Star" (from Reality, 2003) – 4:55
4. "Reality" (from Reality) – 4:21
5. "Fame" (Bowie, John Lennon, Carlos Alomar; from Young Americans, 1975) – 4:11
6. "Cactus" (Black Francis; from Heathen, 2002; originally by the Pixies from Surfer Rosa, 1989) – 2:34
7. "Sister Midnight" (Iggy Pop, Bowie, Alomar; originally from The Idiot by Iggy Pop, 1977) – 4:37
8. "Afraid" (from Heathen) – 3:26
9. "All the Young Dudes" (Bowie song first recorded by Mott the Hoople from All the Young Dudes, 1972) – 3:25
10. "Be My Wife" (from Low, 1977) – 3:12
11. "The Loneliest Guy" (from Reality) – 4:00
12. "The Man Who Sold the World" (from The Man Who Sold the World, 1970) – 4:04
13. "Fantastic Voyage" (Bowie, Brian Eno; from Lodger, 1979) – 3:06
14. "Hallo Spaceboy" (Bowie, Eno; from Outside, 1995) – 5:27
15. "Sunday" (from Heathen) – 5:49
16. "Under Pressure" (Bowie, John Deacon, Brian May, Freddie Mercury, Roger Taylor; originally a single by Bowie and Queen and later found on Hot Space, 1981/1982) – 4:17
17. "Life on Mars?" (from Hunky Dory, 1971) – 4:47
18. "Battle for Britain (The Letter)" (Bowie, Reeves Gabrels, Mark Plati; from Earthling, 1997) – 4:40
19. "Ashes to Ashes" (from Scary Monsters (And Super Creeps)) – 5:29
20. "The Motel" (from Outside) – 6:00
21. "Loving the Alien" (from Tonight, 1984) – 5:16
22. "Never Get Old" (from Reality) – 4:18
23. "Changes" (from Hunky Dory) – 3:48
24. "I'm Afraid of Americans" (Bowie, Eno; from Earthling) – 5:19
25. ""Heroes"" (Bowie, Eno; from "Heroes", 1977) – 7:25
26. "Bring Me the Disco King" (from Reality; at first recorded for Black Tie White Noise (1993) and again for Earthling) – 8:03
27. "Slip Away" (from Heathen) – 6:23
28. "Heathen (The Rays)" (from Heathen) – 6:01
29. "Five Years" (from The Rise and Fall of Ziggy Stardust and the Spiders from Mars, 1972) – 4:40
30. "Hang On to Yourself" (from Ziggy Stardust) – 2:59
31. "Ziggy Stardust" (from Ziggy Stardust) – 4:40
32. "Concert Exit and Credits" – 2:09

== Cinematography ==
The film was a relatively straightforward presentation of the performance in Dublin Ireland, with footage of all the musicians in Bowie's band as well as the lighting/staging effects used, such as the large platforms onstage, the hanging head tree branches, and the artistic footage played on the background video screens. Several different angles were used of Bowie onstage including cameras placed behind Bowie as well as cameras from the audience, and footage was also included of backstage preparations for the performance during the opening, intermission, and ending credits.

Artistic effects were often used as well, amongst them colour distortions (most notably during "Ashes to Ashes") the altering of footage speed (in the opening before "Rebel Rebel"), and rhythmic repetition of footage (the thrashing in "Hallo Spaceboy"). Many were simply embellishing, although some blurred the staging and caused the music to become desynchronised with the musicians. Some interludes into the background footage were used, such as an artistic film of a forest during "The Loneliest Guy" and an introductory clip from The Uncle Floyd Show to "Slip Away" to provide context for the lyrics.

The film was lit by Tom kenny Bowies Designer and programmed by mark cunniffe and has been edited from its original concert appearance; the two sets performed in Dublin on 22 and 23 November do not match entirely with the set from the film. Bowie's signature greeting to every city during the tour, "Hello... you crazy motherfuckers" was not included in the film.

== Personnel ==
- David Bowie – lead vocals, guitar, stylophone
- Earl Slick – guitar
- Gail Ann Dorsey – bass, vocals
- Gerry "Spookyghost" Leonard – guitar, backing vocals
- Sterling Campbell – drums
- Mike Garson – keyboards
- Catherine Russell – keyboards, backing vocals, guitar, percussion
- Tom Kenny – lighting designer

== Charts ==
| Chart (2004) | Peak position |
|---|---|
| Australian DVDs | 14 |
| Austrian Music DVDs | 1 |
| Belgian Music DVDs | 3 |
| Danish Music DVDs | 7 |
| Dutch Music DVDs | 4 |
| German Albums | 59 |
| Irish Music DVDs | 1 |
| New Zealand Music DVDs | 9 |
| Norwegian Music DVDs | 1 |
| Swedish DVDs | 1 |
| US Music Videos | 5 |

== Certifications ==
| Region | Certification | Certified units/sales |
|---|---|---|
| Australia (ARIA) | 3× Platinum | 45,000^{^} |
| France (SNEP) | Platinum | 20,000^{*} |
| Germany (BVMI) | Gold | 25,000^{^} |
| United States (RIAA) | Platinum | 100,000^{^} |
^{*} Sales figures based on certification alone.^{^} Shipments figures based on certification alone.
