= Cactus (Pixies song) =

Song by Pixies

from the album Surfer Rosa
- Released: March 21, 1988
- Recorded: November 1987
- Studio: Downtown Recorders, South End, Boston
- Genre: Alternative rock
- Length: 2:16
- Label: 4AD
- Songwriter: Black Francis
- Producer: Steve Albini

"Cactus" is a song by the American alternative rock band Pixies, and is the eighth track on their 1988 album Surfer Rosa. It was written and sung by the band's frontman Black Francis and engineered by Steve Albini.

== "P-I-X-I-E-S" ==
Between the second verse and chorus of "Cactus," the band and the studio members can be heard spelling out "Pixies." Bass guitarist Kim Deal (then credited as 'Mrs John Murphy' in the sleeve notes of the album), later commented on the interlude: "You can hear them spelling 'Pixies' in the break, which T. Rex did in one of their songs ["The Groover"], 'T-R-E-X,' and they were copying it. I was against it, I was like, 'No way, I'm not doing it,' because that's so trite. And I'm the only one that didn't do it. Steve [Albini] went along with it and liked it. So I'm the only one that never got on the records [...] Anybody that was in the studio could have gone in there and done it."

== Cover versions ==
David Bowie recorded a version of the song for his Heathen album in 2002. This version features D-A-V-I-D spelled in the break. Bowie performed the song live on his 2002 Heathen Tour concerts and the A Reality Tour. A November 2003 live performance is included on the A Reality Tour DVD, as well as the A Reality Tour album. The Pixies played the song at a Bowie tribute concert in 2016, as a Bowie cover.

Black Francis re-recorded the song and released it on his 2004 album Frank Black Francis.

Glen Hansard and The Frames played it live in M-klub on 25 October 2001.
