= Mario J. McNulty =

American record producer (born 1978)

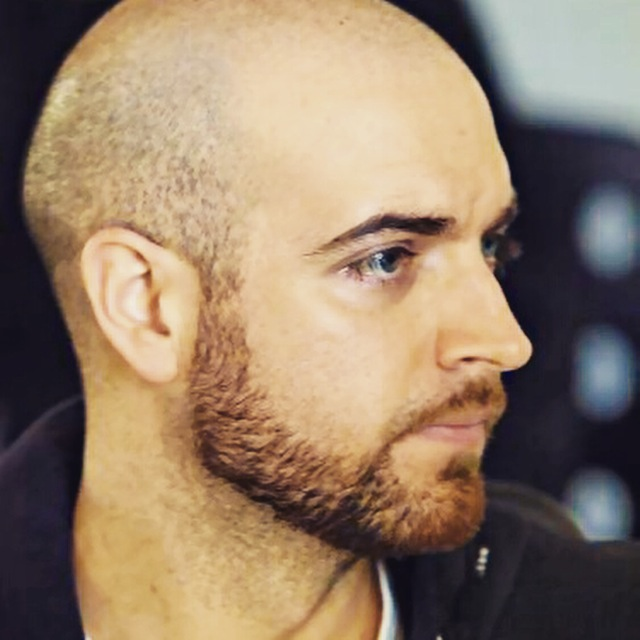
- Born: December 1978 (age 47); Phoenix, Arizona, United States
- Occupations: Record producer; mixer; audio engineer
- Years active: 1998–present
- Website: jdmanagement.com/mariojmcnulty

Mario J. McNulty (born December 1978) is an American Grammy Award-winning record producer and audio engineer based in New York City, United States. He has worked with David Bowie, Prince, Nine Inch Nails, The B-52s, Julian Lennon and many other well-known recording artists. At the 50th Annual Grammy Awards, along with artist Angélique Kidjo and producer Tony Visconti, McNulty won a Grammy in the Best Contemporary World Music category for the album Djin Djin (2007). Other Grammy-nominated albums include Homeland by Laurie Anderson in 2009 and Bowie's The Next Day in 2013.

== Discography ==
- 2018 – Never Let Me Down 2018 by David Bowie; Producer, Engineer, Mixer.
- 2015 – Heart of a Dog by Laurie Anderson; Mixer.
- 2015 – Live Plus One by Michael Gallant Trio; Mixer.
- 2014 – Lumiere by Sasha Lazard; Mixer.
- 2014 – Under My Skin by Tempt; Mixer.
- 2014 – Nothing Has Changed by David Bowie; Engineer, Mixer.
- 2014 – White Women by Chromeo; String Engineer.
- 2013 – Completely by Michael Gallant Trio; Engineer, Mixer.
- 2013 – The Next Day by David Bowie; Engineer.
- 2012 – Sudden Love by Sean Wood; Producer, Engineer, Mixer.
- 2012 – Sunday Love by Fefe Dobson; 5.1 Engineer.
- 2011 – Teeth of Champions by The Madison Square Gardeners; Mixer.
- 2011 – Garden in Flames by Tam Lin; Producer, Engineer, Mixer.
- 2011 – "December Sky" by Julian Lennon and Tomi Swick; Engineer.
- 2011 – Everything Changes by Julian Lennon; Engineer, Mixer.
- 2011 – Florizona by The Silos; Mixer.
- 2010 – Homeland by Laurie Anderson; Engineer, Mixer.
- 2010 – A Thousand Suns by Linkin Park; Engineer.
- 2010 – Hooked! by Lucy Woodward; Engineer.
- 2010 – Raise Hope For Congo by various artists; Engineer.
- 2010 – "Kentish Town Waltz" by Imelda May; Engineer
- 2009 - The World Is As You Are by Halph; Engineer, Mixer, Producer
- 2009 – North, South, East, West...Anthology by Tim Finn; Mixer.
- 2009 – Lightheaded by Citizens; Mixer.
- 2009 – Alter the Ending by Dashboard Confessional; String Engineer.
- 2009 – Keep Your Soul: A Tribute to Doug Sahm by various artists; Mixer.
- 2009 – Listen: Our Time Theater Company by various artists; Mixer.
- 2009 – N.E.D. [No Evidence of Disease] by N.E.D.; Producer, Engineer, Mixer.
- 2009 – The People or the Gun by Anti-Flag; Mixer.
- 2008 – Folie à Deux by Fall Out Boy; String Engineer.
- 2008 – Beauty Dies by The Raveonettes; Mixer.
- 2008 – Real Animal by Alejandro Escovedo; Engineer.
- 2008 – The Bright Lights of America by Anti-Flag; Engineer, Percussion.
- 2008 – We Love You by Semi Precious Weapons; Producer, Engineer, Mixer.
- 2008 – iSelect by David Bowie (song: "Time Will Crawl (MM Remix)"); Engineer, Mixer, Remixer.
- 2008 – Glass Box: A Nonesuch Retrospective by Philip Glass; Assistant Engineer.
- 2008 – Pictures of Tuva by Chirgilchin; Engineer, Mixer.
- 2007 – David Bowie box set by David Bowie; Engineer, Drums, Percussion, Mixer.
- 2007 – Djin Djin by Angélique Kidjo; Engineer.
- 2007 – Please Don't Almost Kill Me by The Cloud Room; Producer, Engineer, Mixer.
- 2006 - Ode To You by Halph; Mixer
- 2006 – Come On Like the Fast Lane by The Silos; Engineer.
- 2006 – No Balance Palace by Kashmir; Digital Editing, Engineer.
- 2006 – Timothy J. Brown: Songs of Light, Songs of Shadows by Justin Ryan; Engineer.
- 2006 – Plague Songs by various artists; Engineer, Mixer.
- 2005 – Stage (reissue); Digital Editing, Engineer (original release 1978).
- 2005 – David Live (reissue) by David Bowie; Digital Editing, Engineer (original release 1974).
- 2005 – Stealth soundtrack; Engineer.
- 2005 – Sweetheart: Love Songs by various artists; Assistant Engineer.
- 2004 – A Reality Tour by David Bowie; Digital Editing, Engineer, Pro-Tools, 5.1 Engineer.
- 2004 – Beyond Elysian Fields by Hugh Cornwell; Engineer, Digital Editing, Pro-Tools.
- 2004 – Dreams That Breathe Your Name by Elysian Fields; Assistant Engineer.
- 2004 – Everyone Is Here by Finn Brothers; Engineer.
- 2004 – Lifeblood by Manic Street Preachers, Engineer.
- 2004 – X by Kristeen Young; Engineer.
- 2004 – Diamond Dogs (30th Anniversary Edition) by David Bowie; Digital Editing, Engineer (original release 1974).
- 2004 – Born to Boogie by T Rex; Engineer.
- 2003 – Charlie's Angels: Full Throttle soundtrack; Engineer.
- 2003 – Dragonfly by Ziggy Marley; Assistant Engineer.
- 2003 – Julia Darling by Julia Darling; Assistant Engineer.
- 2003 – L'Avventura by Dean Wareham and Britta Phillips; Additional Production, Assistant Engineer, Audio Engineer, Pro-Tools.
- 2003 – In Keeping Secrets of Silent Earth: 3 by Coheed and Cambria; Engineer.
- 2003 – Music From the Thin Blue Line by Philip Glass; Engineer (original release 1989).
- 2003 – Reality by David Bowie; Engineer, Mixer Assistant, Drums, Percussion.
- 2003 – Chain Gang of Love by The Raveonettes; Assistant Engineer.
- 2003 – The Complex by Blue Man Group; Additional Production, Pro-Tools.
- 2003 – Want One by Rufus Wainwright; Assistant Engineer.
- 2003 – "Queen of All the Tarts (Overture)" by David Bowie; Engineer.
- 2002 – Naqoyqatsi soundtrack by Philip Glass; Assistant Engineer.
- 2002 – Philip Glass: A Descent into the Maelström by Philip Glass; Assistant Engineer.
- 2002 – Philip Glass: Saxophone by Philip Glass; Assistant Engineer.
- 2002 – Toy by Everett Bradley; Assistant Engineer.
- 2002 – Early Voice: Music by Philip Glass; Assistant Engineer.
- 2002 – The Hours soundtrack by Philip Glass; Assistant Engineer.
