= I'm Afraid of Americans =

Single by David Bowie

from the album Earthling
- A-side: Versions 1–4 (12")
- B-side: Versions 5–6 (12")
- Released: 14 October 1997
- Recorded: August–October 1996
- Studio: Looking Glass (New York City)
- Genre: Industrial rock; techno
- Length: 5:00 (album version); Various (single remixes)
- Label: Virgin
- Songwriters: David Bowie; Brian Eno
- Producers: David Bowie; Reeves Gabrels; Mark Plati (album version); Trent Reznor; Photek (single remixes)

David Bowie singles chronology
"Pallas Athena" (1997)	"I'm Afraid of Americans" (1997)	"I Can't Read" (1997)

Music video
- "I'm Afraid of Americans" on YouTube

"I'm Afraid of Americans" is a song by the English musician David Bowie, released as a single from his album Earthling on 14 October 1997 through Virgin Records. The song was co-written by Bowie and Brian Eno and originally recorded during the sessions for Bowie's 1995 album Outside; this version was released on the soundtrack of Showgirls (1995). The song was then remade during the sessions for Earthling, featuring rewritten lyrics, overdubs and transposed verses. An industrial rock track, it presents a critique of America through the eyes of a stereotypical "Johnny" and is characterised by drum patterns, synthesisers, and various loops and vocal distortions.

The maxi-single release contained six different remixes mostly created by Trent Reznor and his Nine Inch Nails band members; the V3 mix featured Ice Cube while the V5 mix was created by Photek. Reznor subsequently appeared in the song's music video, which reflected the song's theme of a frightened European in an American city. The single was Bowie's final single to chart on the Billboard Hot 100 until 2015, reaching number 66. Reznor's V1 mix has since appeared on several compilation albums.

The song has received positive responses from critics and biographers. Rolling Stone named it one of the 30 most essential songs of Bowie's catalogue in 2016. Some American commentators later acknowledged the significance of the lyrics in the late 2010s. Bowie performed "I'm Afraid of Americans" frequently on his concert tours, live performances from which have been released on live albums. Reznor has performed the song live with Nine Inch Nails as well.

== Writing and recording ==
"I'm Afraid of Americans" was written by Bowie and Brian Eno and originally recorded during the sessions for Bowie's 1995 album Outside. According to biographer Chris O'Leary, recording took place in late 1994 at Mountain Studios in Montreux, Switzerland and the early weeks of 1995 at the Hit Factory in New York City. Titled "Dummy", it featured different lyrics, such as "I'm afraid of the animals" instead of "Americans". Eno recalled in 2016: "I remember [David] recording 'I'm Afraid of Americans' and saying, after one of the early takes, 'No, [the 'Dummy' character's] got to be more self-doubting than that.'" This version was intended for release on the soundtrack for the 1995 film Johnny Mnemonic but was instead released on the soundtrack for the 1995 film Showgirls.

During the sessions for Bowie's next album Earthling (1997), he decided to remake the song with his current band—guitarist Reeves Gabrels, pianist Mike Garson, bassist Gail Ann Dorsey and drummer Zack Alford. Bowie stated: "That was something that Eno and I put together, and I just didn't feel it fit Outside, so it didn't go on it. It just got left behind. So then we took just the embryo of it, and restructured it with this band." Recording for the remake took place between August and October 1996 at Looking Glass Studios in New York City with engineer Mark Plati, who had extensive experience there. Plati and Gabrels were credited as co-producers while Bowie himself mostly self-produced. Regarding the remake, Plati explained: "We pulled things off several different reels to make this new composite. It was quite a clean-up job, not the most enjoyable." Bowie revised the lyrics, changing "Dummy" to "Johnny", and transposed verses while the band provided additional overdubs. Gabrels stated that he added fuzz boxes "until I ran out".

== Composition ==
'I'm Afraid of Americans' was written by myself and Eno. It's not as truly hostile about Americans as say 'Born in the U.S.A.': it's merely sardonic. I was travelling in Java when the first McDonald's went up: it was like, 'for fuck's sake.' The invasion by any homogenised culture is so depressing, the erection of another Disney World in, say, Umbria, Italy, more so. It strangles the indigenous culture and narrows [the] expression of life.

— David Bowie in a press release announcing Earthling

In an interview with Mojo magazine in 1997, Bowie described the song as "one of those stereotypical 'Johnny' songs: Johnny does this, Johnny does that". The absurdist lyrics present a critique of America, in line with Bowie's 1975 track "Young Americans". Commentators have seen similarities between the song's titular Johnny and the Johnny of the Lodger track "Repetition" (1979); while the Johnny of the former craves objects of status through self-entitlement, the Johnny of the latter emotionally abuses his wife due to his lower status. The song concludes with the revelation that "God is an American", which biographer Marc Spitz considers an "ironic jingoism".

Musically, reviewers have categorised it as techno, with author James Perone writing that it mixes various industrial and techno styles of the 1980s and 1990s. The Guardian's Caroline Sullivan found the melody reminiscent of Bowie's "Ashes to Ashes" (1980), with a "perky jungle percussion loop", ultimately creating "a most singular fusion of rock and drum & bass". Characterised by drum patterns, synthesisers, various loops and vocal distortions, O'Leary writes that the remake retained the original's "'laughing' hook" and "synth hook pinging around an E♭ octave". Both the original and remake are also in the key of F major. Biographer Nicholas Pegg calls the remake "darker" and "funkier" compared to the original, while Spitz compares the track's "loud/quiet/loud anthem[ic]" quality to the Pixies. Perone considers it "richer" than other Earthling tracks.

== Releases ==
The original version of "I'm Afraid of Americans" was released on the Showgirls soundtrack on 26 September 1995. Earthling was released on 3 February 1997 on CD and LP formats through RCA Records in the UK, Virgin Records in the US, and Arista Records and its parent distributor BMG elsewhere. "I'm Afraid of Americans" was the eighth and penultimate track, between "The Last Thing You Should Do" and "Law (Earthlings on Fire)".

=== Single and music video ===
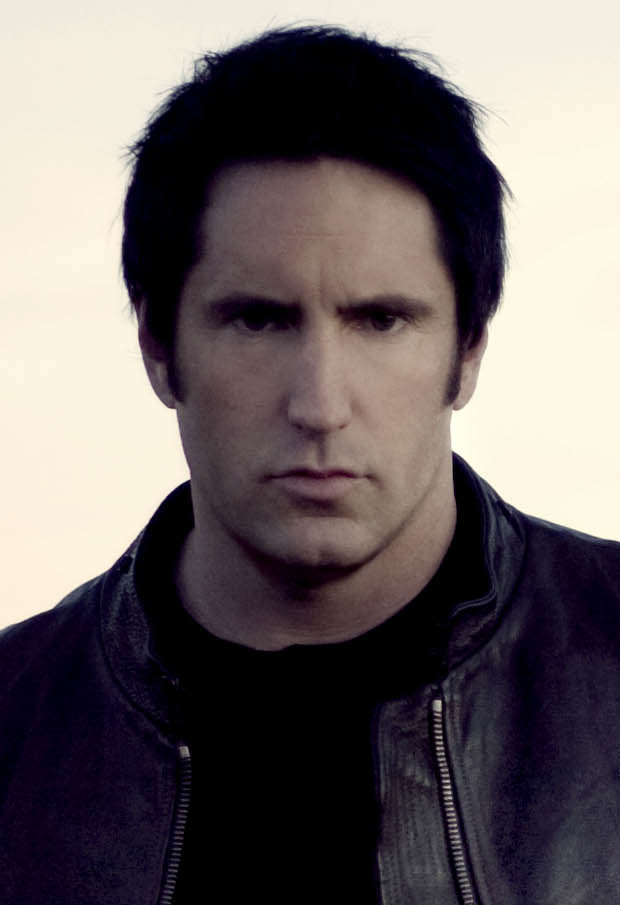
The CD maxi-single featured various remixes by Trent Reznor (pictured in 2008), who appeared in the song's music video.

Virgin issued "I'm Afraid of Americans" as a maxi-single in North America only on 14 October 1997, where it was backed by six remixes; the V3 mix featured guest vocals from the rapper Ice Cube, while the producer Photek created the V5 mix. The project was instigated by Nine Inch Nails' frontman Trent Reznor, continuing his and Bowie's association following the Outside Tour. Reznor, who stated that he "tried to make it a bit darker", stripped the production to its roots to create what the biographer David Buckley calls "an eerie, psychotic track". The ending result is an almost 40-minute project that, in Bowie's words, was "not just a remix [but] almost...an album piece in itself. I was absolutely knocked out when I heard what [Reznor] had done. It was great." Commercially, the single reached number 66 on the Billboard Hot 100 and remained on the chart for 16 weeks, becoming Bowie's biggest hit in the country since "Day-In Day-Out" ten years earlier. It was the final Bowie single to chart on the Hot 100 until the release of "Blackstar" in 2015. It also stayed in the Canadian top 50 for six months.

Reznor also starred as the titular Johnny in the Dom and Nic-directed music video, which was shot in New York City in October 1997 during the American leg of the Earthling Tour. Bowie explained that he chose the duo because they were "making very interesting, quite hard-edged British videos at the moment. I felt it was important that it retained that outsider's perspective of America". The video depicts Bowie as a man who is chased around the streets of New York by a stalker portrayed by Reznor, reflecting the song's theme of a frightened European in an American city. Reznor based his character on Travis Bickle, Robert De Niro's character from the film Taxi Driver (1976). According to Spitz, the video received heavy rotation on MTV, a first for Bowie in over a decade. It also earned Bowie a nomination for Best Male Video at the 1998 MTV Video Music Awards.

O'Leary states that while the track has no "definitive" version, Reznor's V1 mix is the most recognisable, which has appeared on the compilation albums Best of Bowie (2002), Nothing Has Changed (2014), and Bowie Legacy (2016). The Showgirls version, V1 mix and Plati's "Original Edit" were included on the bonus disc of the Earthling expanded edition in 2004.

== Reception and legacy ==
Reviews of the album track were positive. Mojo's Andy Gill considered "I'm Afraid of Americans" the "most direct" track on the album, while Fort Worth Star-Telegram's Dave Ferman called the track "near-genius". In another review for Rolling Stone, Mark Kemp considered the song "a stuttering rocker" that "seems detached from the other songs".

Upon release of the single, Billboard writers Larry Flick and Shawnee Smith praised Reznor's remix as an improvement on the "already deeply moody and largely sharp" original. They further wrote that the Ice Cube remix could provide a successful foray into a hardcore hip hop album. Reviewing the maxi-single for AllMusic, Christian Huey criticised it as "too derivative of Downward Spiral-era Nine Inch Nails" to please Bowie's fans. He argued that it acts better when viewed as a Reznor project rather than a Bowie one. He nevertheless praised Reznor's work on the remixes as well as Photek's contribution. The Rocket's John Graham similarly felt that Reznor's remixes "[add] nothing to the mystique of either [Bowie nor Reznor]". He nevertheless enjoyed Ice Cube's vocals on the "V3" remix.

In later decades, Pegg describes the track as "terrific" while Spitz considered it Bowie's finest single since 1984's "Loving the Alien". Following Bowie's death in 2016, Rolling Stone named "I'm Afraid of Americans" one of the 30 most essential songs of Bowie's catalogue. That same year, Ultimate Classic Rock placed "I'm Afraid of Americans" at number 23 in a list ranking every Bowie single from worst to best, calling it the best song on Earthling and Bowie's best song in over a decade, further commenting: "It would be another decade and a half before he was this good again." A year later, Consequence of Sound placed "I'm Afraid of Americans" at number 66 on their list of Bowie's 70 best songs, writing:

Many ageing rock stars may have been sunk by toying with industrial electronic or having a song feature in the Showgirls soundtrack, but David Bowie excels in even the most theoretically ill-fitting suits, looking sleek and charming. He’s telling tales of humans in ruin, of futility and idealism, and while the original version that appeared in the schlocky midnight movie was afraid of 'the animals,' the eventual final take changed it to 'Americans,' an electro-crunchy slab of sardonic delight.

In 2017, Vice's Jill Krajewski commented on the song's relevance during the presidency of Donald Trump, stating: "'I'm Afraid of Americans' has a darker resonance today not through its chorus, but in a context that gives it unnerving prescience: a snapshot of the [era we live in today]." She argued that the "working-class everyman" (Johnny) were responsible in sharpening the political divide and widespread hate on the internet, presenting a sense of unease living in America as she concludes, "I am afraid of Americans". The same year, Lior Phillips of Consequence of Sound said "The title is a picture-perfect distillation of what it means to live in this world."

== Live versions ==
Following its release, Bowie performed "I'm Afraid of Americans" frequently on concert tours and television appearances. He first performed the track ahead of Earthling's release on 9 January 1997 at his fiftieth birthday concert in New York City with the band Sonic Youth. The song then made regular appearances throughout the Earthling Tour later that year. Three separate live performances of the song were released on live albums included in the box set Brilliant Live Adventures (2020–2021): A July 1997 performance (released on Look at the Moon!), an October 1997 version recorded in New York (included on LiveAndWell.com (1999/2021)), and a version from the Hours Tour in November 1999 on David Bowie At The Kit Kat Klub (Live New York 99).

Bowie performed the song again at Howard Stern's forty-fourth birthday concert in 1998. Bowie's 25 June 2000 performance of the song at the Glastonbury Festival was released in 2018 on Glastonbury 2000. Another live version, recorded at the BBC Radio Theatre, London on 27 June 2000, was released on the bonus disc accompanying the first releases of Bowie at the Beeb in 2000. A performance from his 2003 A Reality Tour was included on the A Reality Tour DVD in 2004, and later on the A Reality Tour album in 2010. A previously unreleased performance from the Montreux Jazz Festival on 18 July 2002 was released on the box set I Can't Give Everything Away (2002–2016) in 2025. Reznor has performed the song live with Nine Inch Nails as well.

== Track listing ==
All tracks are written by David Bowie and Brian Eno. All tracks remixed by Nine Inch Nails, except V5 additionally produced and remixed by Photek.

12" and CD: Virgin / 7243 8 38618 1/2 (US)

A-side:

1. "I'm Afraid of Americans" (V1) – 5:31
2. "I'm Afraid of Americans" (V2) – 5:51
3. "I'm Afraid of Americans" (V3) (with Ice Cube) – 6:18
4. "I'm Afraid of Americans" (V4) – 5:25

B-side:

1. "I'm Afraid of Americans" (V5) – 5:38
2. "I'm Afraid of Americans" (V6) – 11:18

== Personnel ==
According to biographer Chris O'Leary:

Original version

- David Bowie – lead and backing vocals, keyboards, loops, producer
- Brian Eno – keyboards, synthesisers, loops, producer
- Carlos Alomar – guitar
- David Richards – engineer

Earthling version

- David Bowie – lead and backing vocals, keyboards, producer
- Reeves Gabrels – guitar, producer
- Mark Plati – keyboards, synthesisers, loops, producer, engineer
- Mike Garson – electric piano
- Gail Ann Dorsey – bass
- Zack Alford – drums

V1 version

- Trent Reznor
- Danny Lohner
- Charlie Clouser
- Dave Ogilvie
- Keith Hillebrandt

== Charts ==
Chart (1997–98)	Peak position
Canada (Nielsen SoundScan)	14
US Billboard Hot 100	66
US Modern Rock Tracks (Billboard)	29
US Dance Singles Sales (Billboard)	10
US Hot Singles Sales (Billboard)	68
