= Bring Me the Disco King =

Song by David Bowie

from the album Reality
- Recorded: between March and December 1992 at either Mountain Studios, Switzerland; or at 38 Fresh Recordings, L.A.; or at the Hit Factory, NYC.
- Genre: Blue-eyed soul, Jazz
- Length: 7:45 (album version); 6:06 (Lohner remix)
- Songwriter: David Bowie
- Producers: David Bowie, Tony Visconti

"Bring Me the Disco King" is a song written by David Bowie in the early 1990s, and recorded three times, although only the last recording was released, as part of Bowie's Reality album in 2003. A remix was also released in 2003 as part of the Underworld movie soundtrack.

== Background ==
=== Early recordings ===
"Bring Me the Disco King" was first recorded for Black Tie White Noise in 1993 and again for Earthling in 1997, but never made it to the final release of these albums. While promoting Black Tie White Noise, Bowie called the song "a depressing song summing up the sad late Seventies with a Philip Glass refrain running through it", at the time expecting it to be included on the album. Nile Rodgers, who produced the track with Bowie, recalled years later that Bowie wrote it as "a spoof on the whole disco thing from the seventies, one hundred and twenty bpm, very funny. But it just sounded too trite."

=== Reality release ===
In 2003, "Bring Me the Disco King" was recorded for the third time and then released on the album Reality. According to Bowie himself, "I stripped it down completely and just had Mike Garson playing piano. We did it at half the tempo as the original, and now it works brilliant. This poor little orphan Annie thing seems to have a home now." For the drums, Visconti said that this song was "the only track on the album where we utilize the drumming of Matt Chamberlain, even though he was playing to a completely different song. The way that he played was so seductive, so melodic and so beautiful, that we just recorded 'Disco King' over the loops that I'd made of his performance."

Rejecting the raucous guitar-led assault of Reality's title track and the other songs, "Bring Me the Disco King" has a rhythm that often resembles samba, tango and mostly jazz, and according to Nicholas Pegg, "Initially seems incongruous, but its stately presence succeeds in binding the album together". As James E. Perone wrote, "The vague references suggest a look back at a lifetime of wasted moments. [...] The somewhat tired-sounding approach Bowie takes on the song works perfectly within the context of the album's focus on aging."

=== Remix version ===
The song was remixed by ex-Nine Inch Nails bass player/keyboardist Danny Lohner for the soundtrack to the 2003 film Underworld. Maynard James Keenan and John Frusciante also contributed to the remixed track.

== Personnel ==
According to Chris O'Leary:

- David Bowie – lead vocal
- Mike Garson – piano
- Matt Chamberlain – drums

== Live versions ==
Bowie performed the song during the 2003 A Reality Tour. A live version recorded at Riverside Studios, Hammersmith, London, on September 8, 2003, was released on the Tour Edition of Reality. Another version was recorded live during Bowie's concerts at the Point Theatre, Dublin, Ireland on November 22 and 23, 2003, and released on the live DVD A Reality Tour in 2004 and included on the A Reality Tour album released in 2010.

== Cover versions ==
- Donna Lewis - Brand New Day (2015)
