= New Killer Star =

Song by David Bowie

Single by David Bowie

from the album Reality
- B-side: "Love Missile F1-11"
- Released: 29 September 2003
- Recorded: Looking Glass Studios, New York City
- Genre: Alternative rock
- Length: 4:40 (Album version); 3:43 (Radio edit)
- Label: Columbia/ISO Records; COL 674275 9
- Songwriter: David Bowie
- Producers: David Bowie, Tony Visconti

David Bowie singles chronology
"I've Been Waiting for You" (2002)	"New Killer Star" (2003)	"Never Get Old" (2003)

Music video
- "New Killer Star" on YouTube

"New Killer Star" is a song written and performed by the English singer David Bowie in 2003 for his twenty-fourth studio album Reality. This was the first single from the album. The song title is a play on the words 'nuclear star'. The B-side is a cover of Sigue Sigue Sputnik's "Love Missile F1-11".

While it is uncertain what the song is really about (like other Bowie songs), the lyrics make oblique reference to life in post-9/11 New York City. However the video clip, directed by Brumby Boylston of National Television, tells a surreal story using lenticular-postcard-like images of a spaceship almost crashing into the modern American heartland. Bowie himself said of the song: "I'm not a political commentator, but I think there are times when I'm stretched to at least implicate what's happening politically in the songs that I'm writing. And there was some nod, in a very abstract way, toward the wrongs that are being made at the moment with the Middle Eastern situation. I think that song is a pretty good manifesto for the whole record."

== Music video ==
The music video features lenticular images throughout.

== Track listing ==
=== CD: ISO-Columbia / COL 674275 1 (Italy) ===
1. "New Killer Star" - 4:40
2. "Love Missile F1-11"

=== CD: ISO-Columbia / 38K 3445 (Canada) ===
1. "New Killer Star" (Edit) - 3:42
2. "Love Missile F1-11"

=== DVD: ISO/Columbia COL 674275 9 (Austria) ===
1. "New Killer Star (Video version)" - 3:40
2. "Reality (Electronic Press Kit)"
3. "Love Missile F1-11"

== Charts ==
Chart	Peak position
France	69
Italy (FIMI)	48
Argentina	5

== Personnel ==
According to Chris O'Leary:

- David Bowie – vocals, rhythm guitar, Korg Trinity, keyboards
- Earl Slick – guitar
- David Torn – guitar
- Gail Ann Dorsey – background vocals
- Sterling Campbell – drums
- Catherine Russell – background vocals
- Tony Visconti – bass
- Mark Plati – bass

Production

- David Bowie – producer
- Tony Visconti – producer, engineer
- Mario J. McNulty – engineer

== See also ==
- List of anti-war songs
