= Mini Tour (David Bowie) =

2000 concert tour by David Bowie

- Tour by David Bowie
- Ticket for the BBC Radio Theatre concert
- Location: United States; England
- Start date: 16 June 2000
- End date: 27 June 2000
- No. of shows: 4

David Bowie concert chronology
- Hours Tour (1999); Mini Tour (2000); Heathen Tour (2002)

The Mini Tour was a small-scale concert tour by the English singer-songwriter David Bowie including his performance at the Glastonbury Festival on 25 June 2000 and a concert at the BBC Radio Theatre, BBC Broadcasting House, London, on 27 June.

== Live recordings ==
A live recording made on 27 June 2000 for the BBC was documented on a bonus CD included with the first edition of Bowie at the Beeb (2000) in edited form; the full concert was released as part of the box set Brilliant Adventure (1992–2001) (2021). The full performance from the Glastonbury show was released as Glastonbury 2000 on 30 November 2018.

== Setlist ==
This setlist is from the Glastonbury Festival performance on 25 June 2000.

1. "Wild Is the Wind"
2. "China Girl"
3. "Changes"
4. "Stay"
5. "Life on Mars?"
6. "Absolute Beginners"
7. "Ashes to Ashes"
8. "Rebel Rebel"
9. "Little Wonder"
10. "Golden Years"
11. "Fame"
12. "All the Young Dudes"
13. "The Man Who Sold the World"
14. "Station to Station"
15. "Starman"
16. "Hallo Spaceboy"
17. "Under Pressure"

Encore

18. "Ziggy Stardust"
19. "'Heroes'"
20. "Let's Dance"
21. "I'm Afraid of Americans"

== Tour band ==
- David Bowie – vocals, acoustic guitar, harmonica
- Earl Slick – lead guitar
- Mark Plati – rhythm guitar, acoustic guitar, bass guitar, backing vocals
- Gail Ann Dorsey – bass guitar, rhythm guitar, clarinet, vocals
- Sterling Campbell – drums, percussion
- Mike Garson – keyboards, piano
- Holly Palmer – percussion, vocals
- Emm Gryner – keyboard, clarinet, vocals

== Tour dates ==
List of 2000 concerts:
Date	City	Country	Venue	attendance
16 June	New York City	United States	Roseland Ballroom	7,000
19 June	New York City	United States	Roseland Ballroom	7,000
25 June (Note: The concert on 25 June 2000 in Pilton was part of the Glastonbury Festival.)	Pilton	England	Worthy Farm	250,000
27 June	London	England	BBC Radio Theatre	250

== Songs ==
From The Man Who Sold the World

- "The Man Who Sold the World"

From Hunky Dory

- "Changes"
- "Life on Mars?"

From The Rise and Fall of Ziggy Stardust and the Spiders from Mars

- "Starman"
- "Ziggy Stardust"

From Aladdin Sane

- "Cracked Actor"
- "The Jean Genie"

From Diamond Dogs

- "Rebel Rebel"

From Young Americans

- "Fame" (Bowie, John Lennon, Carlos Alomar)

From Station to Station

- "Station to Station"
- "Golden Years"
- "Stay"
- "Wild Is the Wind" (originally a single by Johnny Mathis for the film of the same name (1957); written by Dimitri Tiomkin and Ned Washington)

From Low

- "Always Crashing in the Same Car"

From "Heroes"

- "'Heroes'" (Bowie, Brian Eno)

From Scary Monsters (and Super Creeps)

- "Ashes to Ashes"

From Let's Dance

- "China Girl" (originally from The Idiot (1977) by Iggy Pop; written by Pop and Bowie)
- "Let's Dance"

From Outside

- "Hallo Spaceboy" (Bowie, Eno)

From Earthling

- "Little Wonder" (Bowie, Reeves Gabrels, Mark Plati)
- "I'm Afraid of Americans" (Bowie, Eno)

From Hours

- "Survive" (Bowie, Gabrels)
- "Seven" (Bowie, Gabrels)
- "Thursday's Child" (Bowie, Gabrels)
- "The Pretty Things Are Going to Hell" (Bowie, Gabrels)

Other songs:

- "Absolute Beginners" (from the Absolute Beginners soundtrack (1986); written by Bowie)
- "All the Young Dudes" (from All the Young Dudes (1972) by Mott the Hoople; written by Bowie)
- "I Dig Everything" (early non-album single released in 1966)
- "Love Me Do" (included as a part of "The Jean Genie") (from Please Please Me (1963) by The Beatles; written by Lennon & Paul McCartney)
- "The London Boys" (early non-album B-side to the single "Rubber Band" released in 1966)
- "This Is Not America" (a single by Bowie and the Pat Metheny Group from The Falcon and the Snowman soundtrack; written by Bowie, Pat Metheny and Lyle Mays)
- "Under Pressure" (a single (1981) by Bowie and Queen later found on Hot Space the following year; written by Bowie, John Deacon, Brian May, Freddie Mercury, Roger Taylor)
