= VH1 Storytellers (David Bowie album) =

2009 live album by David Bowie

Live album by David Bowie
- Released: 6 July 2009
- Recorded: 23 August 1999
- Venue: Manhattan Center (New York City)
- Genre: Rock
- Length: 44:37
- Label: EMI

David Bowie chronology
iSelect (2008)	VH1 Storytellers (2009)	A Reality Tour (2010)

David Bowie live albums chronology
Live Santa Monica '72 (2008)	VH1 Storytellers (2009)	A Reality Tour (2010)

VH1 Storytellers

Video by David Bowie
- Released: 2009
- Recorded: 1999
- Length: 64:09
- Label: EMI

David Bowie chronology
A Reality Tour (2004)	VH1 Storytellers (2009)	Glastonbury 2000 (2018)

Professional ratings
Review scores
Source	Rating
AllMusic	3.5/5 stars
The A.V. Club	(B)
Pitchfork Media	(4.5/10)
PopMatters	(4/10)

VH1 Storytellers is a live album by the English singer-songwriter David Bowie. It was released on 6 July 2009 and features a 23 August 1999 performance on Storytellers, a VH1 program.

== Background and recording ==
VH1 Storytellers is the last performance with collaborator and guitarist Reeves Gabrels, whom Bowie had met in 1987 and worked with since 1988, including in the band Tin Machine. Gabrels quit the band 4 days after the show was recorded, leaving Bowie to scramble to find a lead guitarist for his upcoming Hours Tour.

== Packaging and releases ==
The package contained an audio CD and a DVD of footage, with the DVD including four bonus tracks not heard on the CD. The set list comprises songs that spanned Bowie's career until that point, from the 1960s until his then soon-to-be released album Hours (1999). VH1 Storytellers was released on vinyl on 11 October 2019; the double album included the four bonus recordings.

== Track listing ==
All tracks written by David Bowie except where noted.

CD & DVD
No.	Title	Length
1.	"Life on Mars? (Truncated)"	4:22
2.	"Rebel Rebel (Truncated)"	3:15
3.	"Thursday's Child" (Bowie, Reeves Gabrels)	6:43
4.	"Can't Help Thinking About Me"	6:31
5.	"China Girl" (Bowie, Iggy Pop)	6:48
6.	"Seven" (Bowie, Gabrels)	5:01
7.	"Drive-In Saturday"	5:22
8.	"Word on a Wing"	6:35

iTunes, DVD and 2019 vinyl bonus performances
No.	Title	Length
9.	"Survive" (Bowie, Gabrels)	4:01
10.	"I Can't Read" (Bowie, Gabrels)	5:25
11.	"Always Crashing in the Same Car"	3:13
12.	"If I'm Dreaming My Life" (Bowie, Gabrels)	6:53

== Personnel ==
- David Bowie: vocals, guitar
- Reeves Gabrels: guitar
- Mark Plati: guitars
- Gail Ann Dorsey: bass guitar, vocals
- Mike Garson: piano, keyboards
- Sterling Campbell: drums, percussion
- Holly Palmer and Lani Groves: background vocals
- Audio remixer: Mark Plati
- Audio mixer: Thom Cadley

== Charts ==
Chart (2009)	Peak position
UK Albums (OCC)	114

Chart (2019)	Peak position
Hungarian Albums (MAHASZ)	27
