= Survive (David Bowie song) =

Song by David Bowie

Single by David Bowie

from the album Hours
- Released: 17 January 2000
- Recorded: February–June 1999
- Studio: Looking Glass (New York City); Chung King (New York City)
- Genre: Pop rock
- Length: 4:18 (single); 4:11 (album)
- Label: Virgin
- Songwriters: David Bowie; Reeves Gabrels
- Producers: David Bowie; Reeves Gabrels

David Bowie singles chronology
"The Pretty Things Are Going to Hell" (1999)	"Survive" (2000)	"Seven" (2000)

"Survive" is a song by the English musician David Bowie from his 1999 album Hours. It was later released in remixed form as the album's third single on 17 January 2000, reaching number 28 in the UK. Written by Bowie and Reeves Gabrels, it is a reflective number detailing the end of a relationship. Musically, it recalls the sound of Bowie's folk rock music of the late 1960s, and 1971's Hunky Dory. Its music video echoes the reflective quality of the recording, portraying Bowie levitating at a kitchen table with an egg. Critics and biographers praised "Survive" as a highlight of Hours. Bowie performed the song frequently throughout 1999 and 2000.

== Writing and recording ==
"Survive" was written by David Bowie and Reeves Gabrels between late 1998 and early 1999 for a proposed solo album for the latter. Unlike other tracks written for what became the Hours album, the track was not planned for the Omikron: The Nomad Soul video game. The track was also written in a more conventional style reminiscent of Bowie's mid-1980s works, compared to the experimental cut-up nature of his other 1990s recordings. Discussing the track, Bowie said "There's something I find really authentically early seventies about the writing structure of 'Survive'."

The song was recorded between February and June 1999 between Looking Glass and Chung King Studios in New York City. Bowie and Gabrels performed most of the instruments themselves, with overdubs by bassist Mark Plati and drummer Mike Levesque. "Survive" was reportedly Bowie's favourite song on the album.

== Music and lyrics ==
Musically, "Survive" recalls the sound of Bowie's folk rock music of the late 1960s, as well as 1971's Hunky Dory. Biographer Nicholas Pegg likens the lead guitar sound to 1972's "Starman", and the "shuffling" drumbeat and "stop-start verse melodies" to the same year's "Five Years". Author James E. Perone compares its melody, arrangement, guitar lines and emotional weight to the works of principal Moody Blues songwriter and lead singer Justin Hayward. Biographer Marc Spitz opined that following the drum 'n' bass stylings of Earthling (1997), the guitar sound of "Survive" "sounds refreshingly solid and wooden". He also felt Bowie's voice was reminiscent of his old 1960s Deram recordings.

Like fellow Hours track "Something in the Air", "Survive" details an ended relationship, one that, in Spitz's words, is "haunted by regret". Bowie's character in the song, who has ended the relationship either actively ("I should have kept you") or passively ("I should have tried"), concludes that he will survive while harbouring feelings of love, loss and regret. Similar to other tracks on the album, the song contains acknowledgement on the process of aging, and yearning to use the mistakes of the past to have a better future. According to biographer Chris O'Leary, the female character is abstract, rather "a place-filler used by a sad man to stand for his loss of potential". In an interview with Uncut magazine, Bowie explained:

There was a time in my life when I was desperately in love with a girl, and I met her as it happens, quite a number of years later. And boy was the flame dead! So in this case on the album the guy's thinking about a girl he knew many years ago, and she was 'the great mistake he never made'.

== Release ==
Hours was first released through Bowie's website BowieNet on 21 September 1999, followed by an official CD release on 4 October through Virgin Records; it was the first album released for download through the Internet. On Hours, "Survive" was sequenced as the third track, between "Something in the Air" and "If I'm Dreaming My Life".

The song was subsequently released as the third single from the album on 17 January 2000 in a new remix by English producer Marius de Vries. According to O'Leary, the Vries' mix ditched most of Gabrels' guitar work in favour of new guitar parts by Brendan Gallagher of Karma County, who later said that Vries' intention was to "reintroduce several of David Bowie's music periods into [the] production", from the acoustic guitar of "Space Oddity" (1969), to Mick Ronson-type electric guitar akin to "The Jean Genie" (1972) and the guitar work of Lodger (1979) guitarist Adrian Belew. Released through Virgin Records and featuring the album cut and the "Stigmata film version" of "The Pretty Things Are Going to Hell" as the B-sides, the single reached number 28 in the UK.

The music video for "Survive", directed by Walter Stern and shot in London, features Bowie sitting alone at a table waiting for an egg to boil before he, the egg, table and chair start to levitate; by the end, everything has returned to normal. According to Pegg, the video echoes the reflective quality of the recording and has subtle hints to Bowie's past work, such as the anti-gravity and kitchen scenes in "Ashes to Ashes" (1980).

The first CD single contained a PC-playable version of the video. The second featured a live rendition and accompanying video recorded in Paris on 14 October 1999; both videos later appeared on the Best of Bowie DVD (2002). The Vries' mix was later included in the soundtrack of Omikron: The Nomad Soul, on the 2004 reissued Hours bonus disc, the 2014 three-disc edition of Nothing Has Changed and on Re:Call 5, part of the Brilliant Adventure (1992–2001) box set in 2022.

=== Reception ===
"Survive" has received praise from critics and biographers and is acknowledged as a highlight of the Hours album. Author Paul Trynka calls the song "a gem, simple and unaffected, almost Scary Monsters in vibe without any of the overcomplexity and overthinking that seemed synonymous with 1990s Bowie." In The Words and Music of David Bowie, Perone considered the song "effective" and the "product of a master songwriter who knows what connects with an audience and what can lose an audience". Pegg argues "Survive" is one of the "most beautiful" melodies Bowie ever wrote, concluding that it is "a complex, compassionate achievement and undoubtedly one of Bowie's finest songs of the 1990s". More negatively, Ultimate Classic Rock placed the single at number 98 (out of 119) in a list ranking every Bowie single from worst to best in 2016.

== Live performances ==
"Survive" was performed throughout the 1999 Hours Tour and 2000 summer shows, and again on the 2002 Heathen Tour. It also made appearances on several television programmes, including on Channel 4's TFI Friday on 8 October 1999 and on BBC2's TOTP2 special on 3 November. Three more renditions were filmed at the BBC's Maida Vale studios on 25 October for broadcast on various radio stations. Another version was recorded at London's BBC Radio Theatre on 27 June 2000, which was later released on the bonus disc of Bowie at the Beeb (2000); the full concert later appeared on Brilliant Adventure (1992–2001) box set. "Survive" appeared in another BBC radio session dated 18 September 2002. Bowie's performance of the song for VH1's Storytellers series was later released in 2019 in the expanded edition of VH1 Storytellers (2009).

== Track listing ==
=== UK CD version 1 ===
1. "Survive (Marius De Vries mix)" – 4:18
2. "Survive (Album version)" – 4:11
3. "The Pretty Things Are Going to Hell" (Stigmata soundtrack version)

This version also includes the full length "Survive" video in QuickTime format.

=== UK CD version 2 ===
1. "Survive (live)" – 4:11
2. "Thursday's Child (live)" – 5:37
3. "Seven (live)" – 4:06

This version also includes a full length video in QuickTime format of the live version of "Survive". All tracks are from the Paris Elysée Montmartre show on 13 October 1999.

=== International CD version 1 ===
1. "Survive (Marius De Vries mix)" – 4:18
2. "Survive (Album version)" – 4:11

=== International CD version 2 ===
1. "Survive (Marius De Vries mix)" – 4:18
2. "Survive (Album version)" – 4:11
3. "Thursday's Child (live)" – 5:37
4. "Seven (live)" – 4:06

=== 7" picture disc vinyl ===
1. "Survive (Marius De Vries mix)" – 4:18
2. "Seven (live)" – 4:06

== Personnel ==
According to Chris O'Leary:

- David Bowie – lead and backing vocal, keyboards, twelve-string acoustic guitar, Roland TR-707
- Reeves Gabrels – lead and rhythm guitar, acoustic guitar, synthesiser, drum programming
- Mark Plati – bass, Mellotron
- Mike Levesque – drums
- Brendan Gallagher – guitar on "Marius De Vries mix"

Technical

- David Bowie – producer
- Reeves Gabrels – producer
- Kevin Paul – engineer

== Charts ==
Chart (2000)	Peak position
Ireland (IRMA)	45
UK Singles (Official Charts)	28
