= Heathen Tour =

2002 concert tour by David Bowie

- Tour by David Bowie
- Poster to the concert in New York, USA
- Location: Europe; North America
- Associated album: Heathen
- Start date: 11 June 2002
- End date: 23 October 2002
- Legs: 4
- No. of shows: 36

David Bowie concert chronology
- Mini Tour (2000); Heathen Tour (2002); A Reality Tour (2003–04)

The Heathen Tour was a 2002 concert tour by the English singer-songwriter David Bowie in support of his album, Heathen, and was also notable for the performances of all songs from the 1977 Low album.

== History ==
The Low album, not previously performed live in its entirety, was premiered on 11 June 2002 at the Roseland Ballroom in New York City, together with all the songs from the Heathen album. With other commitments ruling out the possibility of a major concert tour, the Heathen Tour became a mini-concert tour similar to the 1996 Outside Summer Festivals Tour.

On 11 February 2002, it was announced that Bowie had accepted the role of Artistic Director at the Meltdown Festival, an annual music and arts event held at the South Bank complex in London, England. David Bowie's Meltdown 2002 ran from 14 to 30 June, with a schedule of concerts and events including performances by The Legendary Stardust Cowboy, Coldplay, The Waterboys and a London Sinfonietta performance of Philip Glass's Low and "Heroes" symphonies. The closing night was billed as The New Heathens Night with Bowie headlining the event with support by The Dandy Warhols followed by a DJ set from Jonathan Ross.

The Heathen Tour proper began at the Meltdown Festival with Bowie embarking on a series of European performances including a link-up with Moby for the 12-date North America Area:2 Festivals with a return to Europe for a further six performances. Before returning again to North America to perform a final seven shows with the first five in each of New York City's five boroughs, dubbed The New York Marathon Tour by Bowie, who joked "I could get home from all the gigs on roller skates".

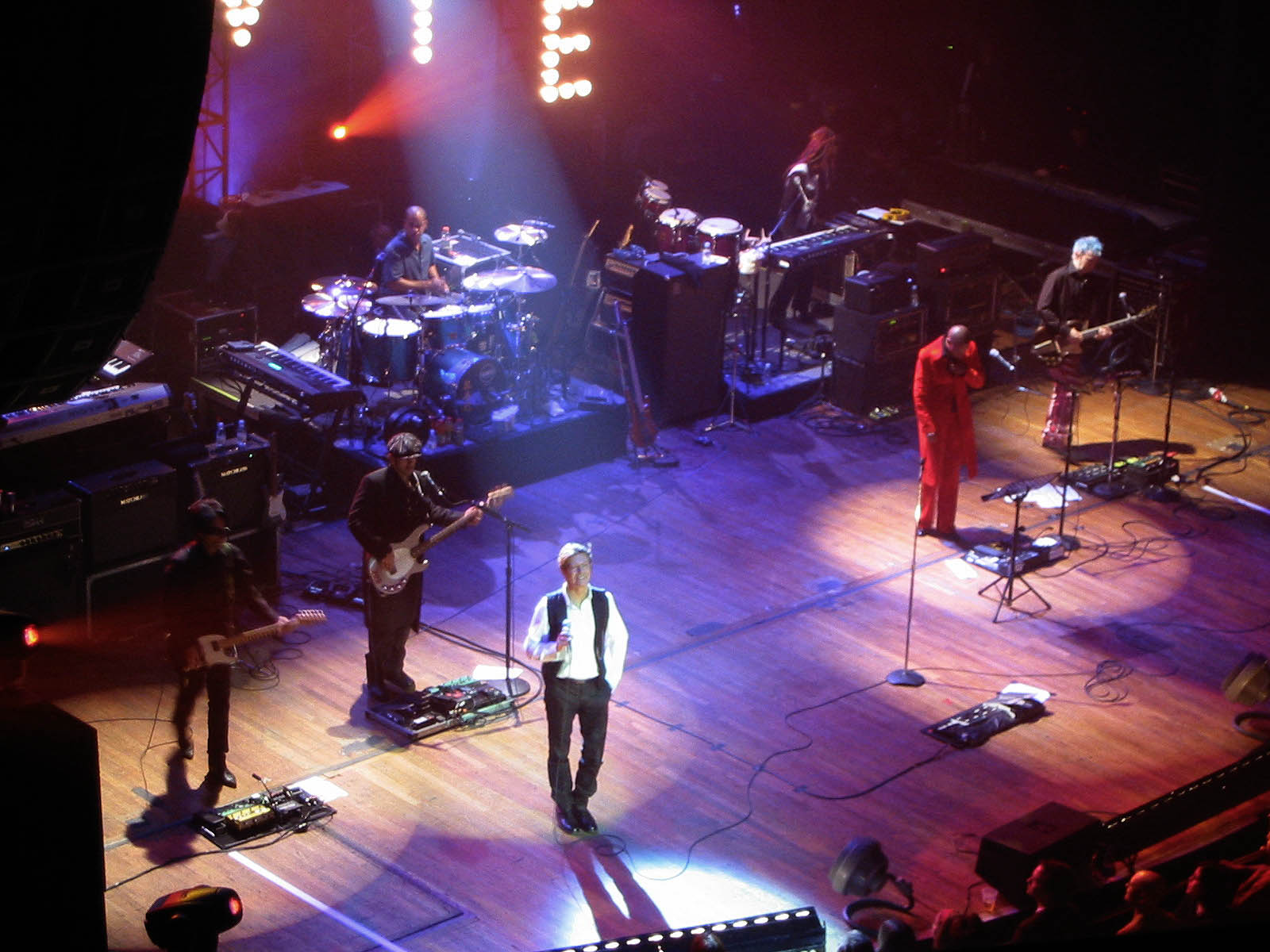
The Heathen Tour at the Beacon Theatre in New York City on 20 October 2002. L to R: Earl Slick (guitar), Mark Plati (guitar), Sterling Campbell (drums), David Bowie, Catherine Russell (keyboards), Gail Ann Dorsey (bass), Gerry Leonard (guitar). Mike Garson (keyboards) is out of shot to the left.

== Setlist ==
The following set list was obtained from the concert held on 11 October 2002 at The Music Hall at Snug Harbour in New York City. It does not represent all concerts for the duration of the tour.

1. "Life on Mars?"
2. "Ashes to Ashes"
3. "Breaking Glass"
4. "Cactus" (Pixies song)
5. "China Girl" (Iggy Pop song)
6. "Slip Away"
7. "Fame"
8. "I'm Afraid of Americans"
9. "Speed of Life"
10. "5:15 The Angels Have Gone"
11. "I've Been Waiting for You" (Neil Young song)
12. "Survive"
13. "Rebel Rebel"
14. "'Heroes'"
15. "Heathen (The Rays)"

Encore

16. "Sunday"
17. "I Would Be Your Slave"
18. "Afraid"
19. "Everyone Says 'Hi'"
20. "Hallo Spaceboy"
21. "Let's Dance"
22. "Ziggy Stardust"

== Tour dates ==
List of 2002 concerts:
Date	City	Country	Venue
11 June	New York City	United States	Roseland Ballroom
15 June	New York City	United States	Sony Music Studios
29 June (Note: The concert on 29 June 2002 in London was part of the Meltdown festival.)	London	England	Royal Festival Hall
1 July	Paris	France	L'Olympia
3 July (Note: The concert on 3 July 2002 in Kristiansand was part of the Quart Festival.)	Kristiansand	Norway	Odderøya
5 July	Horsens	Denmark	Horsens Ny Teater
7 July (Note: The concert on 7 July 2002 in Ostend was part of the Seat Beach Rock Festival.)	Ostend	Belgium	Hippodrome Wellington
10 July (Note: The concert on 10 July 2002 in Manchester was part of the Move Festival.)	Manchester	England	Old Trafford Cricket Ground
12 July (Note: The concert on 12 July 2002 in Manchester was part of the E-Werk festival.)	Cologne	Germany	E-Werk
14 July	Nîmes	France	Arena of Nîmes
15 July (Note: The concert on 15 July 2002 in Lucca was part of the Lucca Summer Festival.)	Lucca	Italy	Piazza Napoleone
18 July (Note: The concert on 18 July 2002 in Montreux was part of the Montreux Jazz Festival.)	Montreux	Switzerland	Auditorium Stravinski
28 July	Bristow	United States	Nissan Pavilion
30 July	Camden	United States	Tweeter Center at the Waterfront
31 July	Holmdel Township	United States	PNC Bank Arts Center
2 August	Wantagh	United States	Tommy Hilfiger at Jones Beach Theater
3 August	Mansfield	United States	Tweeter Center for the Performing Arts
5 August	Toronto	Canada	Molson Amphitheater
6 August	Clarkston	United States	DTE Energy Music Theatre
8 August	Tinley Park	United States	Tweeter Center
10 August	Denver	United States	Pepsi Center
13 August	Irvine	United States	Verizon Wireless Amphitheatre
14 August	Mountain View	United States	Shoreline Amphitheatre
16 August	George	United States	The Gorge Amphitheatre
22 September	Berlin	Germany	Max-Schmeling-Halle
24 September	Paris	France	Le Zénith
25 September	Paris	France	Le Zénith
27 September	Bonn	Germany	Museumsmeile
29 September	Munich	Germany	Olympiahalle
2 October	London	England	Carling Apollo Hammersmith
11 October	New York City	United States	The Music Hall at Snug Harbour
12 October	New York City	United States	St. Anne's Warehouse
16 October	New York City	United States	Colden Center at Queens College
17 October	New York City	United States	Jimmy's Bronx Cafe
20 October	New York City	United States	Beacon Theatre
21 October	Upper Darby Township	United States	Tower Theater
23 October	Boston	United States	Orpheum Theatre

== Tour band ==
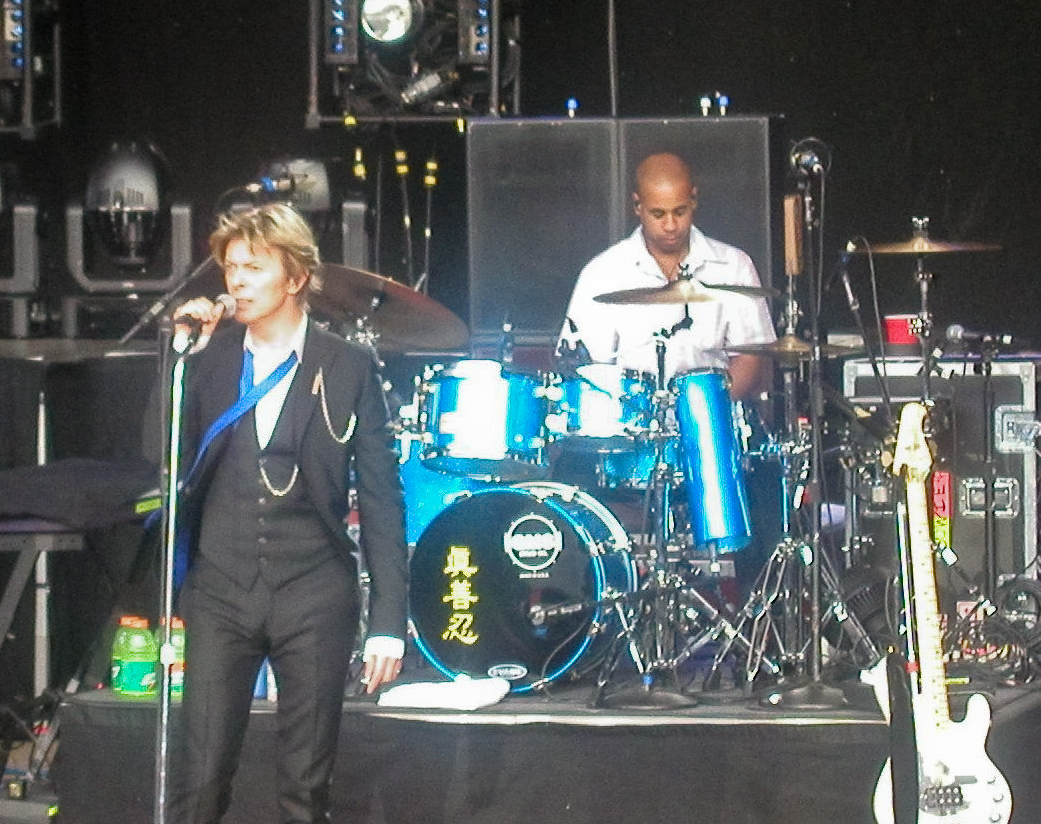
David Bowie performing with Sterling Campbell in Mountain View, California

- David Bowie – vocals, guitar, saxophone, harmonica, stylophone
- Earl Slick – guitar
- Gerry Leonard – guitar, keyboards, backing vocals
- Mark Plati – guitar, bass guitar, keyboards, backing vocals
- Gail Ann Dorsey – bass guitar, guitar, tambourine (on "Heathen (The Rays)"), backing vocals
- Sterling Campbell – drums, percussion
- Mike Garson – keyboards
- Catherine Russell – keyboards, percussion, backing vocals

== Songs ==
From David Bowie

- "Space Oddity"

From Hunky Dory

- "Changes"
- "Life on Mars?"
- "The Bewlay Brothers"

From The Rise and Fall of Ziggy Stardust and the Spiders from Mars

- "Moonage Daydream"
- "Starman"
- "Ziggy Stardust"

From Diamond Dogs

- "Rebel Rebel"

From Young Americans

- "Fame" (Bowie, John Lennon, Carlos Alomar)

From Station to Station

- "Stay"

From Low

- "Speed of Life"
- "Breaking Glass" (Bowie, Dennis Davis, George Murray)
- "What in the World"
- "Sound and Vision"
- "Always Crashing in the Same Car"
- "Be My Wife"
- "A New Career in a New Town"
- "Warszawa" (Bowie, Brian Eno)
- "Art Decade"
- "Weeping Wall"
- "Subterraneans"

From "Heroes"

- "'Heroes'" (Bowie, Eno)

From Lodger

- "Look Back in Anger" (Bowie, Eno)

From Scary Monsters (and Super Creeps)

- "Ashes to Ashes"
- "Fashion"

From Let's Dance

- "China Girl" (originally from The Idiot (1977) by Iggy Pop; written by Pop and Bowie)
- "Let's Dance"

From Outside

- "Hallo Spaceboy" (Bowie, Eno)

From Earthling

- "I'm Afraid of Americans" (Bowie, Eno)

From Hours

- "Survive" (Bowie, Gabrels)

From Heathen

- "Sunday"
- "Cactus" (originally from Surfer Rosa (1989) by the Pixies; written by Black Francis)
- "Slip Away"
- "Slow Burn"
- "Afraid"
- "I've Been Waiting for You" (originally from Neil Young (1968) by Neil Young; written by Young)
- "I Would Be Your Slave"
- "I Took a Trip on a Gemini Spaceship" (originally by Norman Carl Odam)
- "5:15 the Angels Have Gone"
- "Everyone Says 'Hi'"
- "A Better Future"
- "Heathen (The Rays)"

Other songs:

- "Absolute Beginners" (from the Absolute Beginners soundtrack; written by Bowie)
- "Alabama Song" (released as a non-album single (1980); originally from Bertolt Brecht's opera Rise and Fall of the City of Mahagonny (1930); written by Brecht and Kurt Weill)
- "I Feel So Bad" (originally by Chuck Willis in 1953 and covered and released as a B-side to the "Wild in the Country" single (1961) by Elvis Presley; written by Willis)
- "One Night" (originally a single (1958) by Presley; written by Dave Bartholomew, Pearl King and Anita Steiman)
- "White Light/White Heat" (from White Light/White Heat (1968) by The Velvet Underground; written by Lou Reed)
