= The Pretty Things Are Going to Hell =

1999 song by David Bowie

Single by David Bowie

from the album Hours
- Released: 20 September 1999 (Australia and Japan)
- Recorded: February–June 1999
- Studio: Looking Glass (New York City); Chung King (New York City)
- Genre: Glam rock
- Length: 4:40 (album); 3:59 (single)
- Label: Virgin
- Songwriter(s): David Bowie, Reeves Gabrels
- Producer(s): David Bowie, Reeves Gabrels

David Bowie singles chronology
"Thursday's Child" (1999)	"The Pretty Things Are Going to Hell" (1999)	"Under Pressure (Rah Mix)" (1999)

"The Pretty Things Are Going to Hell" is a song by the English musician David Bowie from his 1999 album Hours. Written by Bowie and Reeves Gabrels, its title references past songs such as "Oh! You Pretty Things" and the Stooges' Raw Power track "Your Pretty Face Is Going to Hell". On Hours, the song is a rockier number that contains elements of 1970s glam rock. The lyrics offer views on disillusionment and aging. The song was first released in a different mix in the film Stigmata before being released as the first single from the album in Australia and Japan, replacing "Thursday's Child". An unreleased music video was filmed that depicted Bowie encountering several of his past personas. It was performed live in 1999 and 2000.

== Writing and recording ==
"The Pretty Things Are Going to Hell" was written by David Bowie and Reeves Gabrels between late 1998 and early 1999 for a proposed solo album for the latter. Unlike other tracks written for what became the Hours album, the track was not planned for the Omikron: The Nomad Soul video game. The track was also written in a more conventional style reminiscent of Bowie's mid-1980s works, compared to the experimental cut-up nature of his other 1990s recordings. Bowie wrote lyrics using an instrumental track as a basis; the final track's title references Hunky Dory's "Oh! You Pretty Things" (1971), Tin Machine's "Pretty Thing" (1989), the 1960s group Pretty Things (whom Bowie covered on 1973's Pin Ups) and the Stooges' Raw Power track "Your Pretty Face Is Going to Hell", mixed by Bowie.

The song was recorded between February and June 1999 between Looking Glass and Chung King Studios in New York City. Bowie and Gabrels performed most of the instruments themselves, with overdubs by bassist Mark Plati and drummer Mike Levesque. According to Gabrels, the song was one of the first recorded but one of the last to receive vocals. He later said: "I thought that it was going to remain unfinished but it lived through David's period of dislike for it to become a fan favourite." According to Plati, he and Gabrels went for a "bonehead" sound, or "playing the simplest Neanderthal part possible". He also said that Levesque played under the influence of a biography on the Who drummer Keith Moon, leading to, in Chris O'Leary's words, a mirage of "wild fills and kick and snare hits spiced with tambourine and cowbell".

== Music and lyrics ==
"The Pretty Things Are Going to Hell" is the rockiest piece on Hours, meshing a glam-punk baseline with guitar elements of "Little Wonder" (1997) and percussion of "Diamond Dogs" (1974). Author Dave Thompson of AllMusic describes the song as a "guitar-scything glam anthem" that dates back to the glam-era tracks "All the Young Dudes" (1972) and "Rebel Rebel" (1974). Conversely, author James E. Perone likened the song to late 1970s and early 1980s post-punk and new wave. David Buckley calls the guitar riff the finest Gabrels ever wrote for a Bowie song.

For the lyrics, Bowie was inspired by the "bright young things" in Evelyn Waugh's Vile Bodies (1930), the same novel that influenced 1973's "Aladdin Sane". He explained: "I think their day is numbered. So I thought, well, let's close them off. They wore it well but they did wear themselves out... there's not much room for that now. It's a very serious little world." With humorous comments such as "they wore it out but they wore it well", the lyrics focus on disillusionment and match the general mood of the Hours album, offering looks on aging and cultural critiques similar to "Teenage Wildlife" and "Fashion" (both 1980). Perone calls the song a "strong counterbalance" to the "positivism" of "Thursday's Child".

== Release ==
Hours was first released through Bowie's website BowieNet on 21 September 1999, followed by an official CD release on 4 October through Virgin Records; it was the first album released for download through the Internet. On Hours, "The Pretty Things Are Going to Hell" was sequenced as the seventh track, between "What's Really Happening?" and "New Angels of Promise".

Before its release on Hours, "The Pretty Things Are Going to Hell" first appeared in remixed form in the film Stigmata; the soundtrack album mix differs from the film mix, and another variant appeared on the CD single for "Survive". The Stigmata version also featured in the Omikron: The Nomad Soul game. Thompson describes the Omikron version as "unfamiliarly relaxed, but nevertheless entertaining". The original Hours version replaced "Thursday's Child" as the first single from the album in Australia and Japan in September 1999. A shortened US promo edit, plus the two Stigmata mixes, later appeared on the 2004 bonus disc of Hours.

An unreleased music video for "The Pretty Things Are Going to Hell" was shot by "I'm Afraid of Americans" directors Dom and Nic on 7 September 1999 at the Kit Kat Club in New York. In it, Bowie rehearses the song on stage while encountering four life-size puppets of his past personas: Ziggy Stardust, the dress-wearing Man Who Sold the World, the Thin White Duke and Pierrot from "Ashes to Ashes". The puppets were built by Jim Henson's Creature Shop for a reported £7,000 each. According to Pegg, the figures represent Bowie's "constant struggle to avoid being overwhelmed by his own past". Canadian actor Chad Richardson portrayed a younger version of Bowie. Discussing its unreleased status, Bowie stated that the directors failed to achieve the proper lighting with the puppets. He quipped: "I'm sure it will make its way onto a video compilation one of these days – to be a source of amusement to you all and another form of Chinese torture for myself." Two of the puppets later appeared in the video for Bowie's 2013 single "Love Is Lost", while the unreleased video itself leaked online in 2014.

"The Pretty Things Are Going to Hell" was performed throughout the 1999 Hours Tour and 2000 summer shows. A live version recorded in New York City on 19 November 1999 was released on some formats of the single "Seven" in July 2000. Ultimate Classic Rock placed the single at number 99 (out of 119) in a list ranking every Bowie single from worst to best in 2016.

== Track listing ==
=== CD: Virgin / 7243 8 96293 2 3 (Australia) ===
1. "The Pretty Things Are Going to Hell" – 4:40
2. "The Pretty Things Are Going to Hell (edit)" – 3:59
3. "We Shall Go to Town" – 3:56
4. "1917" – 3:27

=== CD: Virgin / DPRO-14338 (US) ===
1. "The Pretty Things Are Going to Hell (edit)" – 3:59
2. "The Pretty Things Are Going to Hell (Call out hook #1)" – 0:11
3. "The Pretty Things Are Going to Hell (Call out hook #1)" – 0:11
4. "Thursday's Child (Radio edit)" – 4:25
5. "Thursday's Child (Call out hook #1)" – 0:12
6. "Thursday's Child (Call out hook #2)" – 0:12

== Personnel ==
According to Chris O'Leary:

- David Bowie – lead and backing vocal, keyboards
- Reeves Gabrels – lead and rhythm guitar, synthesiser
- Mark Plati – bass
- Mike Levesque – drums, tambourine, percussion

Technical

- David Bowie – producer
- Reeves Gabrels – producer
- Kevin Paul – engineer
- Mark Plati – engineer
