= Hours Tour =

1999 concert tour by David Bowie

- Tour by David Bowie
- Ticket for the concert in Paris, France
- Location: Europe; North America
- Associated album: Hours
- Start date: 9 October 1999
- End date: 7 December 1999
- Legs: 1
- No. of shows: 9

David Bowie concert chronology
- Earthling Tour (1997); Hours Tour (1999); Mini Tour (2000)

The Hours Tour was a small-scale promotional concert tour by the English singer-songwriter David Bowie comprising a handful of live performances and numerous television appearances in support of the album Hours in late 1999. Several live songs from the tour were included as b-sides to singles from the album, and concert recordings from the tour were released in 2020 as Something in the Air (Live Paris 99) and in 2021 with David Bowie At The Kit Kat Klub (Live New York 99).

== Background ==
Bowie had released his album Hours in October 1999, and embarked on a short, mostly-promotional set of shows to promote the album. Prior to the album's release, on 21 August, Bowie and his band performed tracks for UK's Top of the Pops, and two days later on 23 August, they appeared on VH1's Storytellers, released in 2009 as VH1 Storytellers. For the rest of the shows, guitarist Page Hamilton, founding member of Helmet, was drafted to replace Reeves Gabrels whose final performance and association with Bowie ended with the Storytellers performance. Rumours of a split were initially denied by both parties until a few months later when Gabrels guitarist admitted that he and Bowie had drifted apart.

In October, Bowie appeared on the 25th season of Saturday Night Live and played "Thursday's Child" and "Rebel Rebel".

The Libro Music Hall, Vienna, performance on 17 October 1999, coinciding with the launch of BowieNet Europe was made available as a live webcast. Tracks from the Top of the Pops performance on 21 August 1999 were made available in 2024 as part of Hours' 25th anniversary, as were official video recordings from Bowie's performance on Later... with Jools Holland from 4 December 1999.

== Something in the Air (Live Paris 99) ==
Something in the Air (Live Paris 99)

Live album by David Bowie
- Released: 12 March 2021 (physical); 14 August 2020 (streaming)
- Recorded: 14 October 1999
- Venues: Élysée Montmartre, Paris, France
- Label: Parlophone

David Bowie chronology
Look at the Moon! (Live Phoenix Festival 97) (2021)	Something in the Air (Live Paris 99) (2021)	David Bowie Live at the Kit Kat Klub (Live New York 99) (2021)

The Elysée Montmartre performance on 14 October 1999 was filmed and recorded with three songs later appearing on the CD single of "Survive"; the full concert was eventually released in 2020 as Something in the Air (Live Paris 99). The concert is notable for being recorded one day after Bowie received the rank of Commander in the Ordre des Arts et des Lettres by the French government for his contributions to art and music. Something in the Air was released on CD and vinyl for the first time in early 2021, part of the live series Brilliant Live Adventures.

=== Track listing ===
1. "Life on Mars?"
2. "Thursday's Child"
3. "Something in the Air"
4. "Word on a Wing"
5. "Can't Help Thinking About Me"
6. "China Girl"
7. "Always Crashing in the Same Car"
8. "Survive"
9. "Drive-In Saturday"
10. "Changes"
11. "Seven"
12. "Repetition"
13. "I Can't Read"
14. "The Pretty Things Are Going to Hell"
15. "Rebel Rebel"

These live versions of "Thursday's Child", "Survive" and "Seven" were previously released as b-sides to Bowie's 2000 single release of "Survive". Something in the Air reached #16 on the UK album charts.

== David Bowie at the Kit Kat Klub (Live New York 99) ==
David Bowie at the Kit Kat Klub (Live New York 99)

Live album by David Bowie
- Released: 2 April 2021
- Recorded: 19 November 1999
- Venues: Kit Kat Klub, New York City
- Label: Parlophone

David Bowie chronology
Something in the Air (Live Paris 99) (2021)	David Bowie at the Kit Kat Klub (Live New York 99) (2021)	Brilliant Adventure (1992–2001) (2021)

In November 1999, Bowie performed a concert at the small Kit Kat Klub in New York to invitees and contest winners. This show was filmed as part of the American Express Blue Concert series transmitted on 7 December 1999, in addition to a simulcast radio broadcast by SFX Radio network on the same date, and eventually released on a promotional-only CD-R that pared the setlist down to 12 songs. The webcast, reportedly one of the first live streams of a concert, was fraught with issues and was described as going "not particularly smooth." This live release, sourced from the same promotional CD-R released in late 1999/early 2000 was announced on 17 March 2021 and released on 2 April 2021. Live at the Kit Kat Klub reached #20 in the UK and #93 in Ireland upon its release.

=== Track listing ===
1. "Life on Mars?"
2. "Thursday's Child"
3. "Something in the Air"
4. "China Girl"
5. "Can't Help Thinking About Me"
6. "Always Crashing in the Same Car"
7. "Survive"
8. "Drive-In Saturday"
9. "Stay"
10. "Seven"
11. "Changes"
12. "Cracked Actor"
13. "Ashes to Ashes"
14. "Repetition"
15. "The Pretty Things Are Going to Hell"
16. "Rebel Rebel"
17. "I'm Afraid of Americans"
- italics denotes songs performed at the show, but not included on the live recording.

== Tour band ==
- David Bowie – vocals, acoustic guitar
- Reeves Gabrels – lead guitar, 23 August 1999 only
- Page Hamilton – lead guitar, 9 October onwards
- Mark Plati – rhythm guitar, acoustic guitar, bass guitar, backing vocals, music director
- Gail Ann Dorsey – bass guitar, rhythm guitar, backing vocals
- Sterling Campbell – drums, percussion
- Mike Garson – keyboards, piano
- Holly Palmer – backing vocals, percussion
- Emm Gryner – backing vocals

== Tour dates ==
Date	City	Country	Venue	Notes
North America
23 August 1999	New York City	United States	Manhattan Center	VH1 Storytellers
Europe
9 October 1999	London	England	NetAid – Wembley Stadium	
10 October 1999	Dublin	Ireland	Dublin HQ	
14 October 1999	Paris	France	Elysée Montmartre	Something in the Air
17 October 1999	Vienna	Austria	Libro Music Hall	Bowienet Europe launch
North America
19 November 1999	New York City	United States	Kit Kat Klub	American Express Blue Concert series David Bowie at the Kit Kat Klub (Live New York 99)
Europe
2 December 1999	London	England	The Astoria	
4 December 1999	Milan	Italy	Alcatraz	
7 December 1999	Copenhagen	Denmark	Vega	

== Songs ==
From Hunky Dory

- "Changes"
- "Life on Mars?"

From Aladdin Sane

- "Drive-In Saturday"
- "Cracked Actor"

From Diamond Dogs

- "Rebel Rebel"

From Station to Station

- "Word on a Wing"
- "Stay"

From Low

- "Always Crashing in the Same Car"

From Lodger

- "Repetition"

From Scary Monsters (And Super Creeps)

- "Ashes to Ashes"

From Let's Dance

- "China Girl" (originally from The Idiot (1977) by Iggy Pop; written by Pop and Bowie)

From Tin Machine

- "I Can't Read" (Bowie, Reeves Gabrels)

From Earthling

- "I'm Afraid of Americans" (Bowie, Brian Eno)

From Hours

- "Thursday's Child" (Bowie, Gabrels)
- "Something in the Air" (Bowie, Gabrels)
- "Survive" (Bowie, Gabrels)
- "If I'm Dreaming My Life" (Bowie, Gabrels)
- "Seven" (Bowie, Gabrels)
- "The Pretty Things Are Going to Hell" (Bowie, Gabrels)

Other songs:

- "Can't Help Thinking About Me" (early non-album single released in 1966)
