= Thursday's Child (David Bowie song) =

Song by David Bowie

Single by David Bowie

from the album Hours
- B-side: "We Shall Go to Town"
- Released: 20 September 1999
- Recorded: April–May 1999
- Studio: Seaview Studio (Bermuda)
- Genre: Pop rock; soul
- Length: 5:24 (album version); 4:25 (single edit)
- Label: Virgin
- Songwriters: David Bowie; Reeves Gabrels
- Producers: David Bowie; Reeves Gabrels

David Bowie singles chronology
"I Can't Read" (1997)	"Thursday's Child" (1999)	"The Pretty Things Are Going to Hell" (1999)

Music video
- "Thursday's Child" on YouTube

"Thursday's Child" is a song recorded by David Bowie for his twenty-second studio album Hours (1999). Written by Bowie and Reeves Gabrels, the song was released as the album's lead single on 20 September 1999, by Virgin Records.

== Background and composition ==
It was the first single from Hours and preceded the album by two weeks. In a performance for VH1 Storytellers, Bowie revealed that the title of the song was prompted by the memory of the autobiography of singer and actress Eartha Kitt. The book, also called Thursday's Child, used to be a favourite of his when he was 14 years old.

The song, just like "Ashes to Ashes", is inspired by Danny Kaye's "Inchworm". According to Nicholas Pegg the song references Ray Charles' "That Lucky Old Sun" and John Donne's poem "The Sun Rising".

According to the song's songwriter and producer Reeves Gabrels, Bowie initially wanted group TLC to sing background vocals on the song. However, he convinced Bowie not to do it, and invited his friend Holly Palmer to do the vocals instead. According to Gabrels, "I was David's friend, and his guitar player, musical director, co-producer, but I was also a fan. I felt like I was protecting his 'thing'. I wanted to make sure he stayed cool and stayed connected. He was a voracious chaser of new things. But not every new thing [should be chased]".

The song begins with Bowie singing: "All of my life I've tried so hard/Doing my best with what I had/Nothing much happened all the same". In an interview with Uncut, the singer commented about the song: "I'm supposed to say, 'Ah, but that's the secret of stagecraft!' But no, I don't find it particularly hard – the guy in the song's had a tough life, though. He's a teeth-grinding, I'll-get-this-job-done guy. But, right, it's not a dogged labour for me: I do work hard, but it comes easily". Bowie further expanded on the song, revealing that it was about "somebody that maybe felt that he'd achieved anything that he was ever going to achieve in his life and that the way forward looked as bleak as much of his past had done.....until it was changed by meeting this particular person that he falls in love with. So it's like a glimmer of salvation in his own life".

== Critical reception ==
Jon Barnsley from News of the World viewed "Thursday's Child" as "a crafted, laidback offering".

== B-sides ==
One of the single's B-sides was a track written by Bowie and Gabrels called "We Shall Go to Town", which was originally slated for inclusion on the album itself. Gabrels called it "a very dark track" in contrast to the rest of the album. He said the song "was about two people who were so grotesque, horribly disfigured, and people would stone them on the street, and they grew tired of having to live in the shadows, it's like an 'Elephant Man' thing. And they think 'Tonight's the night we go to town. This might be our last night on earth because people will probably kill us.' That was a little less jolly than 'Thursday's Child.'"

"1917" was originally called "Thrust" and was included in the video game The Nomad Soul during a rooftop fight with a demon, part of the soundtrack for the game written by Bowie and Gabrels. "No One Calls" was also from the game's soundtrack, with an alternate title of "Awakened 2", where it appeared only in instrumental form.

== Live versions ==
On 3 October 1999, David Bowie was the musical guest on the 25th season of the television program "Saturday Night Live", performing "Thursday's Child" and "Rebel Rebel". A live version recorded in Paris in October 1999 was released on the single "Survive" in January 2000, and the full concert from which it was taken was released in 2021 as Something in the Air (Live Paris 99). A performance from November 1999 was included in the live concert release David Bowie at the Kit Kat Klub (Live New York 99) (2021).

== Other releases ==
"Thursday's Child" was released on a promotional release of the single "The Pretty Things Are Going to Hell" in 1999. Both the "Rock mix" and a slower version from the Omikron – The Nomad Soul video game was released on the bonus disc that followed the 2004 reissue of Hours. The radio edit of the song was included on some editions of Best of Bowie (2002), on the 3-disc and 2-disc versions of Nothing Has Changed (2014), and on the 2-disc edition of Bowie Legacy (2016).

== Music video ==
The accompanying music video for "Thursday's Child" was directed by Walter Stern, and was filmed in early August 1999 in New York City. In Bowie's own words, "The video is a strange and slow moving piece that wanders between a present and a past in a bewildering fashion". It shows Bowie in a motel room, looking in a mirror at his younger self (played by Owen Beasley) and reminiscing on his life and what could have been. Kara Manning from MTV News considered the video "surreal", while Time's Melissa Locker and Flavorwire's Tom Hawking included it on their respective lists of Bowie's ten best music videos, with the former describing it as "melancholy and contemplative", and the latter similarly commenting that the video's "reflective, melancholy mood" matched the song.

== Track listing ==
- UK CD version 1
1. "Thursday's Child (edit)" – 4:25
2. "We All Go Through" – 4:09
3. "No One Calls" – 3:51
- UK CD version 2
1. "Thursday's Child (Rock mix)" – 4:27
2. "We Shall Go to Town" – 3:56
3. "1917" – 3:27

This version also includes the full length "Thursday's Child" video in QuickTime format.

- International CD version 1
1. "Thursday's Child (Radio edit)" – 4:25
2. "Thursday's Child (Rock mix)" – 4:27
3. "We Shall Go to Town" – 3:56
4. "1917" – 3:27
- International CD version 2
1. "Thursday's Child (Radio edit)" – 4:25
2. "Thursday's Child (Rock mix)" – 4:27
- Promo version
1. "Thursday's Child (Radio edit)" – 4:25
2. "Thursday's Child (Rock mix)" – 4:27
3. "Thursday's Child (Album version)" – 5:24
- CD: Virgin / DPRO-14338 (US)
1. "The Pretty Things Are Going to Hell (edit)" – 3:59
2. "The Pretty Things Are Going to Hell (Call out hook #1)" – 0:11
3. "The Pretty Things Are Going to Hell (Call out hook #2)" – 0:11
4. "Thursday's Child (Radio edit)" – 4:25
5. "Thursday's Child (Call out hook #1)" – 0:12
6. "Thursday's Child (Call out hook #2)" – 0:12

A cassette version was also released with the three tracks from the UK CD version 1 on both sides of the tape.

== Personnel ==
- David Bowie: Lead Vocals
- Holly Palmer: Backing Vocals
- Reeves Gabrels: Guitar
- Mark Plati: Synthesizers, Bass Guitar
- Sterling Campbell: Drum Machine

== Charts ==
=== Weekly charts ===
Chart (1999)	Peak position
Belgium (Ultratip Bubbling Under Flanders)	16
France (IFOP)	32
Germany (GfK)	62
Italy Airplay (Music & Media)	4
Netherlands (Single Top 100)	81
Scottish Singles Sales (Official Charts)	17
Sweden (Sverigetopplistan)	48
UK Singles (Official Charts)	16
