= Élysée Montmartre =

Music venue and cinema in Paris, France

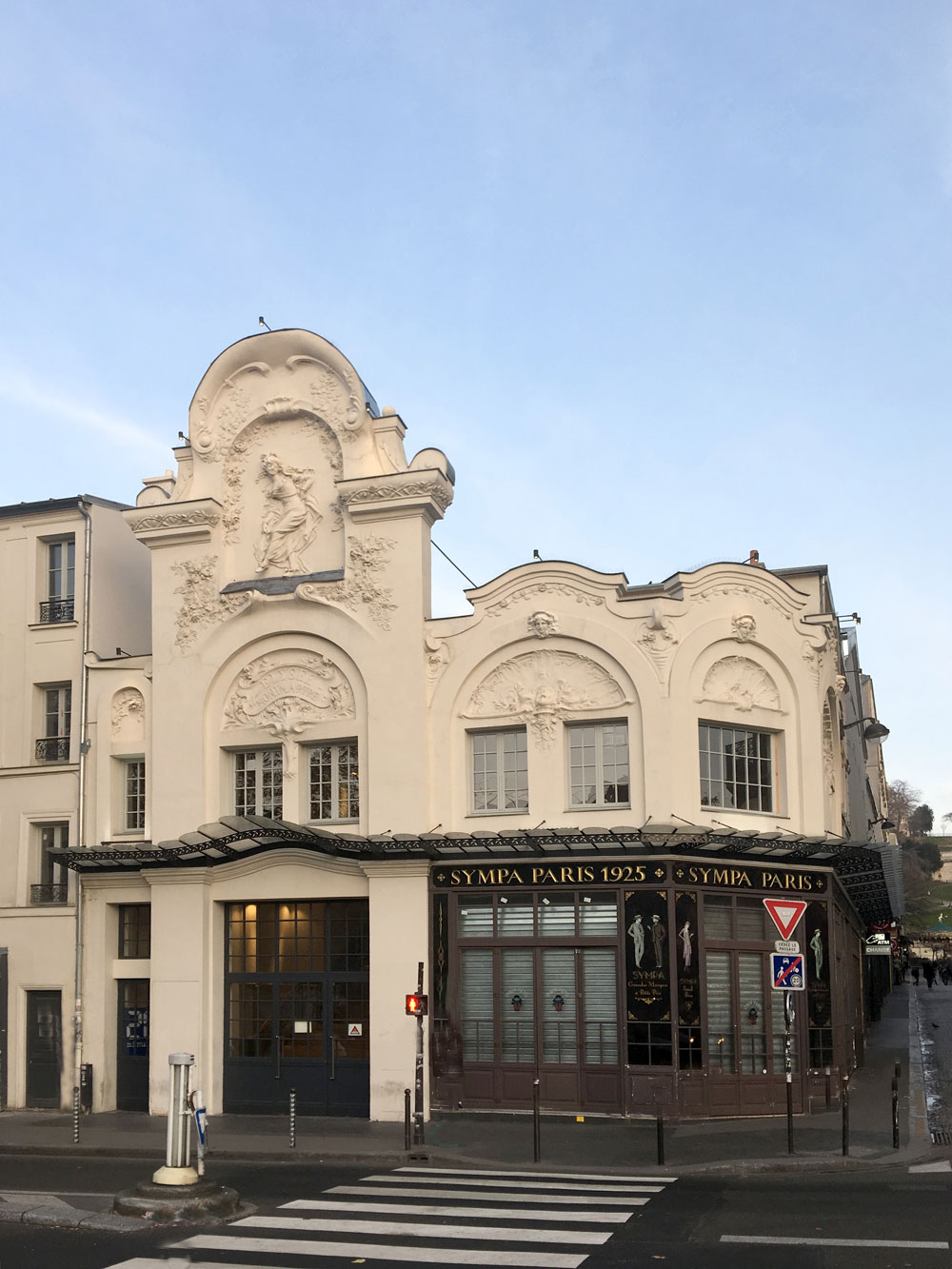
- Interactive map of Élysée Montmartre
- Address: 72, boulevard de Rochechouart
- Location: Paris
- Coordinates: 48°52′59.16″N 2°20′36.239″E
- Capacity: 1,380
- Public transit: Anvers Station, Paris Metro

Construction
- Opened: 1807
- Renovated: 1900, 2016

Website
- www.elyseemontmartre.com/fr/

Élysée Montmartre (French: L'Élysée Montmartre, pronounced [elize mɔ̃maʁtʁ]) is a music venue located at 72 Boulevard de Rochechouart, Paris, France. It opened in 1807, burned down in 2011, reopened in 2016, and has a capacity of 1,380 patrons. The nearest métro station is Anvers.

== Origins ==
The Élysée Montmartre was originally a ballroom inaugurated in 1807 where the famous Can-Can was performed among others dances during the 19th century.

In 1900, the venue was damaged by fire and re-decorated. After the Second World War, it started hosting boxing matches. It also hosted professional wrestling shows, becoming a frequent venue for French television coverage from the 1950s to the 1980s. Roger Delaporte, a wrestler, referee and promoter, owned the venue until he sold it in 1988, to the production company Garance Productions.

== Notable productions ==
The piece The Mask by Maupassant takes place in the venue. Henri de Toulouse-Lautrec created several paintings here as well.

From the mid-1970s to the mid-1980s, a wide variety of French and international performers gained notoriety at the location, including Patti Smith, Alain Souchon, and Jacques Higelin.

In 1992, Steel Pulse released their first live album, Rastafari Centennial – Live in Paris, which was recorded over three nights at the venue.

David Bowie's performance, during the Hours Tour, on 14 October 1999, was filmed and recorded, with three songs later appearing on the CD single of "Survive". A heavily edited recording was released to streaming services as a live album entitled "Something in the Air (Live Paris '99)" in 2020; and later in limited quantities on physical media on 12 March 2021.

American metal band Symphony X recorded their first live album, Live on the Edge of Forever, at the venue during a tour in 2000.

In 2005, Cradle of Filth recorded their live DVD, Peace Through Superior Firepower at the venue. The performance was filmed on 2 April 2005.

In 2007, Counting Crows re-released their debut album, August and Everything After, as a two-disc deluxe edition. The second disc is a recording of a performance at the theatre on 9 December 1994.

The venue is mentioned in The Roots' 1999 song, "You Got Me", as a place where the subject saw the band and narrator perform, even though they both lived in the same building in Philadelphia.

== Recent history ==
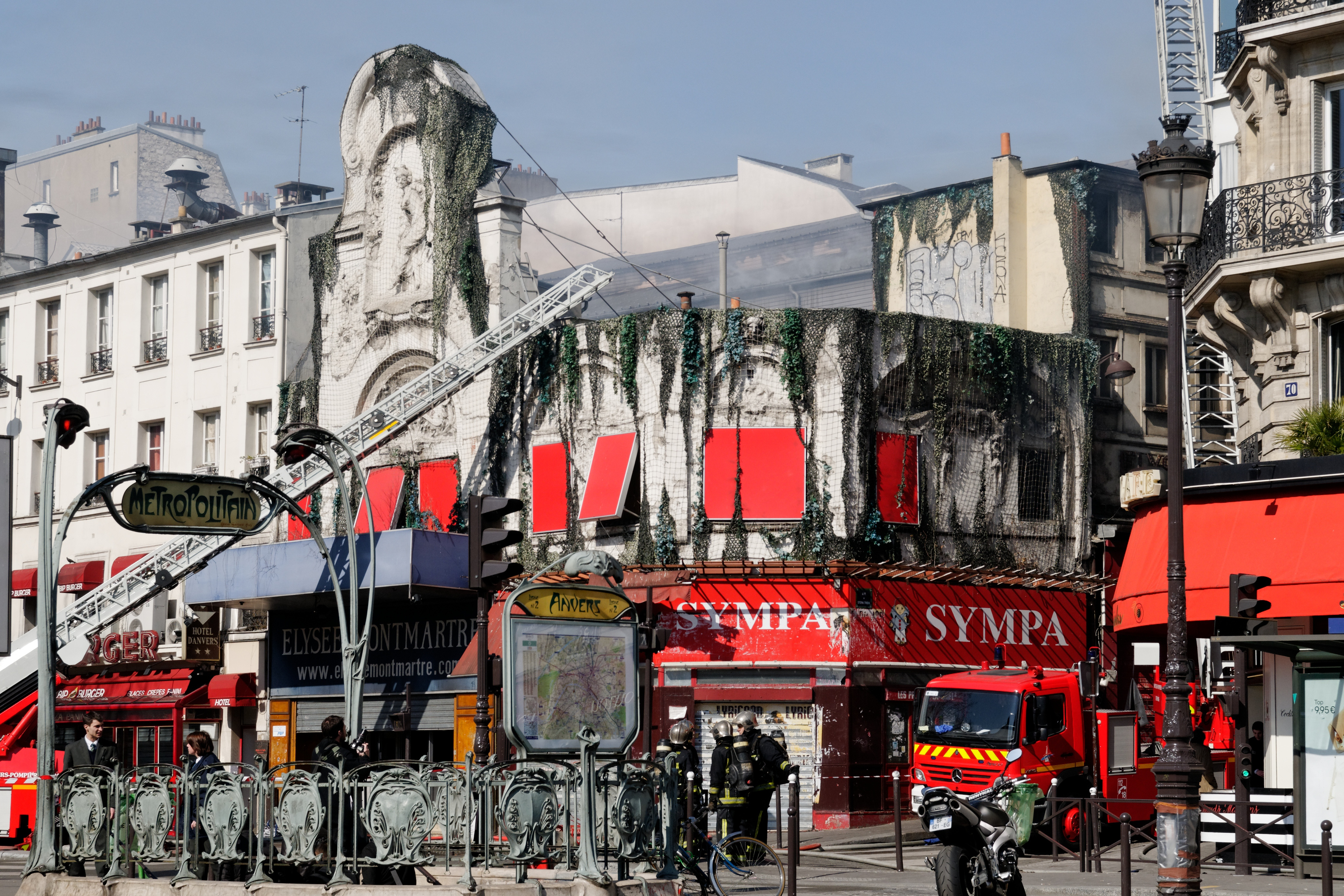
The Élysée Montmartre burning.

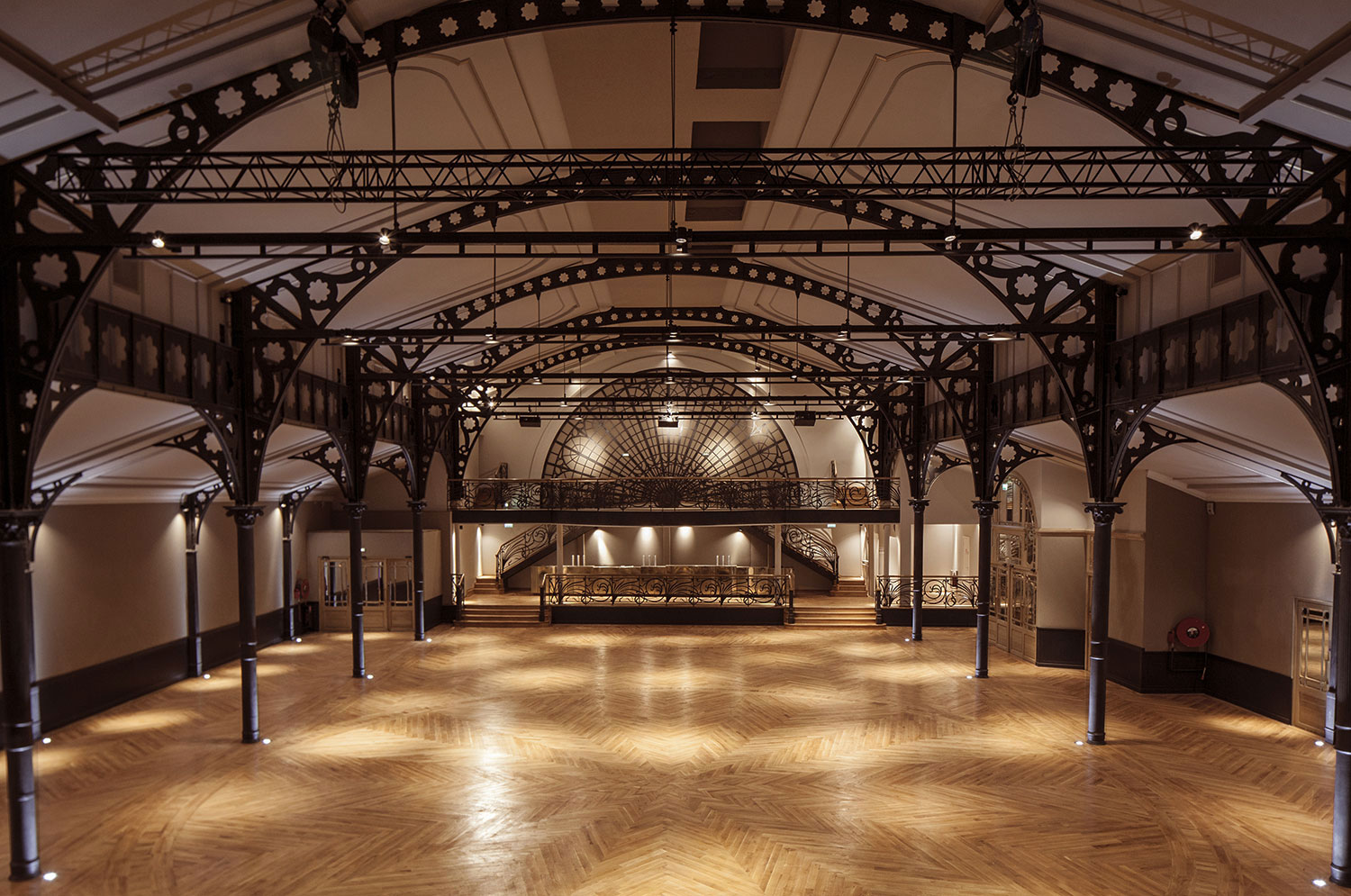
The main room

The room returned to its original vocation in 1995 with dancing evenings animated by the Grand Orchestre de L’Élysée Montmartre and it is now one of the most famous music venues in the city.

Finnish Metal band Sonata Arctica was the last band to perform at "Élysée" on 16 March 2011, before the building caught fire on the morning of 22 March 2011.

The venue was purchased by Julien Labrousse and Abel Nahmias in 2013, it was rebuilt completely under the direction of Julien Labrousse, and it reopened in September 2016 with a concert of Matthieu Chedid.

In 2025, part of the building was converted into a hotel. The project won Archdaily's Building of the Year award in 2025.
