= China Girl (song) =

1977 song written by David Bowie and Iggy Pop

Single by Iggy Pop

from the album The Idiot
- B-side: "Baby"
- Released: 13 May 1977
- Recorded: July–August 1976
- Studio: Château d'Hérouville (Hérouville); Musicland (Munich)
- Genre: Art rock; post-punk
- Length: 5:08 (album version); 3:26 (single version)
- Label: RCA
- Songwriters: David Bowie; Iggy Pop
- Producer: David Bowie

Iggy Pop singles chronology
"Sister Midnight" (1977)	"China Girl" (1977)	"Success/The Passenger" (1977)

"China Girl" is a song written by Iggy Pop and David Bowie in 1976, and first released by Pop on his debut solo album, The Idiot (1977). Inspired by an affair Pop had with a Vietnamese woman, the lyrics tell a story of unrequited love for the protagonist's Asian girlfriend, realizing by the end that his Western influences are corrupting her. Like the rest of The Idiot, Bowie wrote the music and Pop improvised the lyrics while standing at the microphone. The song was released as a single in May 1977 and failed to chart.

Bowie recorded a more well-known version during the sessions for his 1983 album Let's Dance, reportedly to assist Pop with his poor finances at the time. It was co-produced by Nile Rodgers, who transformed the song into a pop number with an Asian-inspired guitar riff. Bowie's version was released as the second single from the album in May 1983, reaching number two in the UK and number 10 in the US. Its accompanying music video featured New Zealand actress Geeling Ng. Containing an interracial romance and clashing cultural perspectives, Bowie said the video was intended as a statement against racism. He performed the song frequently during his concert tours. Bowie's version has also appeared on compilation albums and lists of the artist's best songs.

== Iggy Pop original version ==
=== Recording ===
Written by David Bowie and Iggy Pop, "China Girl" began as a piece called "Borderline" that the two came up with one night residing at the Château d'Hérouville in Hérouville, France, during the sessions for Pop's debut solo album The Idiot. During a visit by the French actor and singer Jacques Higelin, Pop had a brief affair with Higelin's Vietnamese girlfriend Kuelan Nguyen. The two did not speak the same language, communicating through gestures and expressions. Their brief encounter inspired the lyrics for "China Girl", which Pop improvised while standing at the microphone. (Note: Bowie later used this method when recording "Heroes" (1977).)

The song was recorded between June and July at the Château, with overdubs recorded in August at Musicland Studios in Munich, Germany. As with the rest of The Idiot, Bowie composed the music, contributing piano, synthesizer, alto saxophone, rhythm guitar, toy piano, and backing vocals. The remaining lineup featured Phil Palmer on lead guitar, Laurent Thibault on bass, and Michel Santangeli on drums. The song was mixed in Berlin at Hansa Studio 1.

=== Music and lyrics ===
It's about a very blundering, blustering rock 'n' roll hero who has big plans and Western habits [and] who becomes enchanted and subdued by a Chinese girl.

— Iggy Pop on "China Girl"

"China Girl" is the most upbeat track on The Idiot. Built on E minor chord progressions, the song is led primarily by distorted guitar and synthesizer. It features a raw and unpolished production compared to Bowie's version. Lyrically, the song is a tale of unrequited love for the protagonist's Asian girlfriend, realizing by the end that his Western influences are corrupting her. The protagonist's "Shhh ..." was a direct quote from Nguyen after Pop confessed his feelings for her one night. He speaks of natural elements—falling stars and hearts beating "as loud as thunder"—before introducing modernization—Marlon Brando, "visions of swastikas", television, and cosmetics—that will "ruin everything you are". The author James E. Perone argues that the use of swastikas could reference both the symbol of Hinduism and the fascism of Nazi Germany, "intriguing images and questions" for listeners. According to author Chris O'Leary, the song's title represents a double entendre, indicating "China" as "pure heroin" and "the girl's fragility". Bowie said the song was about "invasion and exploitation".

=== Release ===
The Idiot was released through RCA Records on March 18, 1977; "China Girl" was sequenced as the final track on side one of the original LP. Deemed an album highlight by multiple reviewers, ZigZag magazine's Kris Needs felt the song was the only choice for a single from the album. "China Girl" was released as a single, with the album track "Baby" as the B-side, on May 13, and failed to chart.

Pop played "China Girl" throughout the 1977 Idiot Tour, with Bowie on keyboards. According to O'Leary, these performances differed from the studio recording in that they were "catchier" and featured "frenetic drumming" and less "krautrock drone". Live recordings from the tour have been released on the Pop compilations 1977 (2007) and The Bowie Years (2020), the latter also featuring an alternate mix of the song.

Biographers have praised "China Girl" for Bowie's musical arrangement. Siouxsie Sioux of Siouxsie and the Banshees later said she prefers Pop's version. According to Iggy Pop biographer Joe Ambrose, The Idiot songs "China Girl", "Nightclubbing", and "Sister Midnight" "became part of the soundtrack of the age, the synthesized post-punk Eighties". The song was later included on Pop's compilation A Million in Prizes: The Anthology (2005).

=== Personnel ===
According to Chris O'Leary and Thomas Jerome Seabrook:

- Iggy Pop – vocals
- David Bowie – treated piano, synthesizers, alto saxophone, toy piano, rhythm guitar, backing vocal
- Phil Palmer – lead guitar
- Laurent Thibault – bass guitar
- Michel Santangeli – drums

Technical

- David Bowie – producer
- Laurent Thibault – engineer

== David Bowie version ==
"China Girl"

Single by David Bowie

from the album Let's Dance
- B-side: "Shake It"
- Released: 31 May 1983
- Recorded: December 1982
- Studio: Power Station (New York City)
- Genre: Pop; new wave
- Length: 5:32 (album version); 4:14 (single version)
- Label: EMI America
- Songwriters: David Bowie; Iggy Pop
- Producers: David Bowie; Nile Rodgers

David Bowie singles chronology
"Let's Dance" (1983)	"China Girl" (1983)	"Modern Love" (1983)

Music video
- "China Girl" on YouTube

=== Recording and composition ===
Bowie recorded his own version of "China Girl" during the sessions for his 1983 album Let's Dance, reportedly to assist Pop with his poor finances at the time. Bowie played Pop's original for the producer Nile Rodgers, believing it could be a hit. Transforming it into a pop and new wave number, the producer used Rufus's "Sweet Thing" (referencing the oriental riff) as a basis for the opening to add a Chinese feel. The song ends with a reprise of this "faux-Asian" introduction. According to the biographer Nicholas Pegg, the song's placement on Let's Dance provides a basis for the album's primary themes of "cultural identity and desperate love". Both Pop and Bowie versions feature the same melody and use of Chinese bells.

Co-produced by Bowie and Rodgers, the song was recorded at the Power Station in New York City during the first three weeks of December 1982. The sessions were engineered by Bob Clearmountain. The lineup featured Rodgers on rhythm guitar, Carmine Rojas on bass, Robert Sabino on keyboards and synthesizers, Omar Hakim on drums, Sammy Figueroa on percussion, and the trio of Frank Simms, George Simms, and David Spinner on backing vocals. The then-unknown Texas blues guitarist Stevie Ray Vaughan played lead guitar, hired by Bowie after seeing Vaughan perform at the 1982 Montreux Jazz Festival in Switzerland. According to the biographer Chris O'Leary, Vaughan initially played longer than his allotted measures during his first solo, resulting in him ending on an unintended note. He wanted to correct it before Bowie insisted the mistake be kept. Bowie himself played no instruments.

=== Release ===
"China Girl" was first released in its full-length form on Let's Dance on 14 April 1983, sequenced as the second track on side one of the original LP, between "Modern Love" and the title track. The song was subsequently released in edited form as the second single from the album on 31 May 1983, with album track "Shake It" as the B-side. Bowie had intended "China Girl" to be the album's lead single before Rodgers convinced him to release "Let's Dance" first. Entering the UK Singles Chart on 11 June, the single peaked at number two, held off the top spot by the Police's "Every Breath You Take". In the US, it reached number ten on the Billboard Hot 100.

The single edit of "China Girl" has appeared on the Bowie compilations Changesbowie (1990), The Singles Collection (1993), Best of Bowie (2002), The Best of David Bowie 1980/1987 (2007), Nothing Has Changed (2014) and Legacy (The Very Best of David Bowie) (2016). Both single and album cuts were remastered and released on the box set Loving the Alien (1983–1988) in 2018.

=== Music video ===
The song's music video was directed by David Mallet and was shot in February 1983 in the Chinatown district of Sydney, Australia, simultaneously with the video for "Let's Dance", and features New Zealand model and actress Geeling Ng. Fascinated by Australia's large Chinese community, Bowie said that the video for "China Girl" was "a vignette of my continuing fascination with all things Asian." As the video for "Let's Dance" had offered commentary on racism in Australia, "China Girl"'s video was described by Bowie at the time as a "very simple, very direct" statement against racism. The video ends with Bowie and Ng recreating a scene from the 1953 film From Here to Eternity, lying naked in the surf. Ng remembered Bowie as "unfailingly polite, charming, and a gentleman."

The video depicts clashing cultural perspectives with an interracial romance and, according to Ruth Tam of The Washington Post, parodies Asian female stereotypes as a way to condemn racism and denounce the West's disparaging view of the East; Ng is transformed into a Westerner's vision of a Chinese goddess and shots of barbed wire offer totalitarian undertones. In a negative assessment published in 1993, Columbia University professor Ellie M. Hisama condemned the video's portrayal of the "China Girl" as lacking in "identity or self-determination", rather simply "reduced to a sex and a race". In his book Future Nostalgia: Performing David Bowie, author Sheldon Waldrep doubted that many people understood the video's message, saying: "Maybe some of [the joke] comes through in the music video if you interpret it as ironically as Bowie meant it to be interpreted." The author also attributed the video's subtleness for people's failure to understand its message: "He put layers of meaning in there hoping that people would get it."

The video was banned from New Zealand and some other countries at the time. Top of the Pops aired an edited video that censored the nudity by utilizing wide-shots and slow-motion edits. The uncensored video was issued on the 1984 Video EP, while the censored version later appeared on Best of Bowie in 2002. The original video won an MTV video award for Best Male Video in 1984.

=== Reception ===
Bowie's version of "China Girl" has received positive reviews, with many praising Rodgers's production and Bowie's vocal performance. Reviewing the single on release, Cash Box said that it provided "a nice balance to the controlled frenzy" of "Let's Dance" with its "softer vocals and minimal instrumentation" and also said that the song is "neatly [framed]" by "an oriental-style riff." In a retrospective review, BBC writer David Quantick commended Rodgers' production, saying "nobody but Rodgers could have taken a song like 'China Girl', with its paranoid references to 'visions of swastikas', and turned it into a sweet, romantic hit single". AllMusic's Ned Raggett referred to it as "a prime example of early eighties mainstream music done right", praising the production, arrangement, and Vaughan's guitar solo as "add[ing] just enough bite without sending the tune off track".

Due to its appearance on Let's Dance and success as a single, Bowie's version is more widely known than Pop's original; O'Leary argues that "China Girl" is a Bowie song "for much of the world". Numerous reviewers have compared the two versions. O'Leary notes that where Pop "sang in frenzy", Bowie's vocal was "assured" and "playful". Reviewing Let's Dance on release, NME's Charles Shaar Murray summarized: "Iggy's version was full of rage and pain, concentrating on the torment which only his lover could ease. Bowie's, on the other hand, focuses on the relief from pain, and the joy that can be brought by someone capable of bringing that relief." Another reviewer from the same publication, Emily Barker, later said in 2018 that Bowie altered the original's "claustrophobic scratchiness" to "extroverted disco". Mojo's Danny Eccelston found Bowie's version superior to the original.

Following Bowie's death in January 2016, the writers of Rolling Stone named "China Girl" one of the 30 most essential songs of his catalogue. The song has placed in other lists ranking Bowie's best songs by The Telegraph (included), Smooth Radio (12), NME (27), Consequence of Sound (60), and Mojo (63). In a 2016 list ranking every Bowie single from worst to best, Ultimate Classic Rock placed it at number 29 (out of 119).

=== Live performances ===
Bowie regularly performed "China Girl" on the 1983 Serious Moonlight and 1987 Glass Spider tours; recordings appeared on the accompanying Serious Moonlight and Glass Spider concert videos in 1983 and 1988, respectively. The former performance was later released on the live album Serious Moonlight (Live '83), included in Loving the Alien (1983–1988) in 2018 and released separately the following year. "China Girl" was also performed on the 1990 Sound+Vision tour.

A semi-acoustic version appeared during Bowie's Bridge School benefit concert on 20 October 1996. The following year, he played an impromptu jam of the track on The Rosie O'Donnell Show for Rosie O'Donnell, retitled "Rosie Girl". The song made return appearances on the 1999 Hours, 2000 summer shows, 2002 Heathen and 2003–2004 A Reality tours, often featuring a cabaret-style opening by Mike Garson that led into a bass-heavy rendition more akin to Pop's original. Other live recordings have been released on VH1 Storytellers in 2009, Glastonbury 2000 in 2018, and A Reality Tour in 2010. A previously unreleased performance from the Montreux Jazz Festival on 18 July 2002 was released on the box set I Can't Give Everything Away (2002–2016) in 2025.

=== Personnel ===
According to Chris O'Leary:

- David Bowie – lead vocal
- Stevie Ray Vaughan – lead guitar
- Nile Rodgers – rhythm guitar
- Carmine Rojas – bass
- Robert Sabino – keyboards, synthesizer
- Omar Hakim – drums
- Sammy Figueroa – percussion
- Frank Simms, George Simms, David Spinner – backing vocals

Technical

- David Bowie – producer
- Nile Rodgers – producer
- Bob Clearmountain – engineer

=== Charts ===
==== Weekly charts ====
1983 weekly chart performance for "China Girl"
Chart (1983)	Peak position
Australia (Kent Music Report)	15
Austria (Ö3 Austria Top 40)	9
Belgium (Ultratop 50 Flanders)	3
Canada Top Singles (RPM)	6
Finland (Suomen virallinen lista)	6
France (IFOP)	15
Germany (GfK)	6
Iceland (Íslenski Listinn)	1
Ireland (IRMA)	2
Israel (Kol Yisrael)	1
Luxembourg (Radio Luxembourg)	1
Netherlands (Dutch Top 40)	2
Netherlands (Single Top 100)	5
New Zealand (Recorded Music NZ)	3
Norway (VG-lista)	7
South Africa (Springbok Radio)	17
Sweden (Sverigetopplistan)	5
Switzerland (Schweizer Hitparade)	8
UK Singles (Official Charts)	2
US Billboard Hot 100	10
US Dance Club Songs (Billboard)	51
US Mainstream Rock Airplay (Billboard)	3

2016 weekly chart performance for "China Girl"
Chart (2016)	Peak position
France (SNEP)	18
Switzerland (Schweizer Hitparade)	61
UK Singles (Official Charts)	97
US Hot Rock & Alternative Songs (Billboard)	20
US Billboard Rock Digital Songs	21

==== Year-end charts ====
1983 year-end chart performance for "China Girl"
Chart (1983)	Rank
Belgium (Ultratop 50 Flanders)	15
Canada Top Singles (RPM)	43
France (IFOP)	56
Germany (Official German Charts)	59
Netherlands (Dutch Top 40)	29
Netherlands (Single Top 100)	65
New Zealand (Official New Zealand Music Chart)	38
UK Singles (OCC)	78
US Billboard Hot 100	62
US Cash Box Top 100	59

=== Certifications ===
Sales and certifications for "China Girl"
Region	Certification	Certified units/sales
Canada (Music Canada)	Gold	50,000^{^}
France	—	250,000
New Zealand (RMNZ)	Platinum	30,000^{‡}
United Kingdom (BPI)	Silver	250,000^{^}
^{^} Shipments figures based on certification alone.^{‡} Sales+streaming figures based on certification alone.
