= Seven (David Bowie song) =

Song by David Bowie

Single by David Bowie

from the album Hours
- Released: 17 July 2000
- Recorded: Seaview, Bermuda
- Genre: Pop rock
- Length: 4:12
- Label: Virgin
- Songwriters: David Bowie; Reeves Gabrels
- Producers: David Bowie; Reeves Gabrels

David Bowie singles chronology
"Survive" (2000)	"Seven" (2000)	"Slow Burn" (2002)

Alternative cover
- The cover of UK CD version 3

"Seven" is a song written by David Bowie and Reeves Gabrels for the album Hours in 1999. As with some of the other songs from Hours it was originally written for the computer game Omikron: The Nomad Soul from 1999. In July 2000, it was released as the fourth single from the album. The version used in the Omikron: The Nomad Soul was called "demo version" on the single releases.

== Track listing ==
=== UK version 1 ===
1. "Seven" (Marius De Vries mix) – 4:12
2. "Seven" (Beck mix) – 3:44
3. "Seven" (Original demo) – 4:05

=== UK version 2 ===
1. "Seven" (album version) – 4:27
2. "I'm Afraid of Americans" (Nine Inch Nails version) – 5:30

This version also included the music video of "I'm Afraid of Americans".

=== UK version 3 ===
1. "Seven" (live)
2. "Something in the Air" (live)
3. "The Pretty Things Are Going to Hell" (live)

All tracks was recorded at Kit Kat Klub, New York City, 19 November 1999.

=== International version 1 ===
1. "Seven" (Marius De Vries mix) – 4:12
2. "Seven" (Beck mix) – 3:44
3. "Seven" (live)
4. "Seven" (original demo) – 4:05
5. "Seven" (album version) – 4:04

This version also included the music video of "I'm Afraid of Americans".

=== International version 2 ===
1. "Seven" (Marius De Vries mix) – 4:12
2. "Seven" (Beck mix) – 3:44

=== Promo version ===
1. "Seven" (Marius De Vries mix) – 4:12
2. "Seven" (Beck mix) – 3:44
3. "Seven" (original demo) – 4:05
4. "Seven" (album version) – 4:04

== Personnel ==
- David Bowie – vocals, acoustic guitar
- Mark Plati – synthesizers, bass guitar
- Reeves Gabrels – electric guitar
- Sterling Campbell – drums

== Charts ==
Chart	Peak position
Netherlands (Single Top 100)	97

UK: #32

== Live versions ==
- A live version recorded in Paris in October 1999 was released on the single "Survive" in January 2000.
- Another version recorded at Kit Kat Klub, New York City, 19 November 1999 was released as a single in the UK.
- Bowie performed the song live at the BBC Radio Theatre in London, 27 June 2000, and a recording of this performance was included on the bonus disc that accompanied the initial release of Bowie at the Beeb in 2000.

== Other releases ==
- The "Demo version", "Marius De Vries mix", and two different Beck remixes were released on the bonus disc that followed the 2004 reissue of Hours—with the "Marius De Vries mix" also included as part of the Nothing Has Changed compilation.
