= BowieNet =

Internet service provider (1998–2006)

Homepage of BowieNet

BowieNet was an Internet service provider launched by singer-songwriter David Bowie in 1998 and active until 2006.

== History ==
Bowie was an early user of the Internet, reportedly using email as early as the late 1980s. In 1996 he released the song "Telling Lies" as an Internet download, the first downloadable single by a major artist. On 21 September 1999, he released his album Hours exclusively through BowieNet before its physical CD release on 4 October; the release made Bowie the first major artist to release a complete album for download through the Internet.

In 1997 and 1998, Bowie worked with Robert Goodale and Ron Roy to understand the potential of the Internet as a resource for music distribution and fan outreach. BowieNet launched in September 1998, and offered dial-up service access to the Internet for $19.95 per month or £10.00 in the UK. Users with another ISP could pay $5.95 to access www.davidbowie.com. For the service, Bowie partnered with the network services companies UltraStar and Concentric Network Corp (now XO Communications). At its peak, BowieNet had about 100,000 customers.

Some fans criticised the charging of a fee to access the site, claiming that "people were already having to pay for access to the internet, and now if they were going to have to pay for every single thing that they were interested in, that (seemed that) the internet was going to be the preserve of the rich forever". After heavily criticising the charging of a fee for BowieNet on other Bowie fansites, Irish fan Dara O'Kearney claims that Bowie himself started contacting him from the email address "bxqr@mindspring.com", singing off with the initials "db" (lower-case), to find out more about why O'Kearney disagreed with it so much. O'Kearney believed at first that the person was probably a Bowie impersonator; he later became more convinced that the person was actually Bowie, after he was able to put O'Kearney on the guestlist for the Dublin shows of his A Reality Tour in 2003.

In an interview with ZDTV, Bowie revealed that "at least two or three times a week I go into the (chat) rooms... on my site and anonymously, generally - there's some times, I have, I have a name that (the fans) know, know me by, so they... I participate (on the chats) a lot more than they think!". He added "I got several, I got several, eh, addresses... so it would be very hard for them to... I know some of you know what they are but, eh, don't spam me...".

BowieNet ceased operating in 2006.

== Exclusive content ==
Members received an @davidbowie.com-ending email address and had exclusive access to audio recordings, music videos and chat rooms, which Bowie participated in himself. One of the handles used by Bowie was 'Sailor', an anagram of the word 'Isolar', recalling in an interview that "Isola is Italian for 'island.' Isolation plus Solar equals Isolar. If I remember correctly, I was stoned." (Note: Bowie named his 1976 and 1978 world tours the "Isolar" and "Isolar II" tours, respectively.) He would appear unannounced and talk, with a special guest sometimes joining in,. He would upload personal photos, as well as images of his paintings and some of his journals, on the site.

=== Song contest ===
In 1999, Bowie ran a contest through his website to help him co-write a song. Over 80,000 people submitted lyrics. The lyrics chosen were written by a 20-year-old American, Alex Grant, about the concept of a virtual existence on the internet. The recording of the song was live-streamed via a 360-degree interactive webcast, a groundbreaking technology at the time. The song titled, "What's Really Happening?", was later released on Hours (1999).

=== LiveAndWell.com ===
In 1997, during Bowie's Earthling Tour, live tracks were recorded for a live album release; however, the release was cancelled by Virgin, Bowie's label. Following that cancellation, Bowie assembled and released a different live album, made up of tracks recorded across several of Bowie's mid- to late-1990s tours, exclusively to BowieNet subscribers as LiveAndWell.com (1999). Re-released in 2000, again exclusively to BowieNet subscribers but with a bonus CD of remixes, LiveAndWell.com remained unavailable to non-subscribers until its public (re-)release in 2021, which did not include the bonus CD.

=== BowieWorld ===
The site offered access to BowieWorld, a 3D environment that allowed users to control an avatar that could walk through a three-dimensional city, decorated with images Bowie chose including pictures of himself and posters, and communicate with other users.

== See also ==
- Celebrity bond
- The Nomad Soul
- Cyberpunk, an album by Billy Idol which set several precedents in music promotion including the use of the Internet, multimedia software, and virtual communities
