= Always Crashing in the Same Car =

Song by David Bowie

from the album Low
- Released: 14 January 1977
- Recorded: September–November 1976
- Length: 3:33
- Label: RCA
- Songwriter: David Bowie
- Producers: David Bowie; Tony Visconti

"Always Crashing in the Same Car" is a song written by David Bowie from his album Low, 1977.

The song's lyrics express the frustration of making the same mistake over and over. The narrator of the song recounts driving at a high speed in circles around a hotel garage, cautiously checking for danger, yet still inevitably crashing, while a girl named Jasmine looks on. Note: Jasmine might also be a metaphor for the flowering creeping flower rather than a "girl".

== Background ==
The song refers to a real-life incident in Bowie's life that occurred at the height of his cocaine addiction. Driving his Mercedes, Bowie had spotted a drug dealer on the streets who he believed had ripped him off. In retaliation, Bowie repeatedly rammed his own car into the dealer's car, after which he returned to his hotel and ended up driving around in circles in the hotel's underground garage. It is also reported that "Jasmine" refers to Iggy Pop, who was supposedly with Bowie in the car at that time.

There are two verses to the piece, although three were planned. In the studio, Bowie sang a third verse in a quasi-Bob Dylan style, intended to be funny. However, given Bob Dylan's infamous motorcycling accident years earlier and the song's subject matter, the band considered such a move to be crass, and Bowie asked Tony Visconti to delete the verse from the recording.

Biographer Hugo Wilcken considered the song, similar to "Be My Wife", as being influenced by lyrics within the Syd Barrett album The Madcap Laughs (1970), as well as the James Joyce poem "Golden Hair" which Barrett put to music. He also noted that at the time of Low's recording, Brian Eno was in possession of the Farfisa organ Pink Floyd had used on the track "Matilda Mother", and that a Farfisa was used on Low, though was unsure whether the two were one and the same. The song features the use of synthesizers and treatments to bring Bowie's largely calm vocals over the sound of the band. A long guitar solo completes the song.

== Live versions ==
Bowie and Reeves Gabrels performed an all-acoustic version of the song for the radio station WRXT on 16 October 1997, while doing press stops for the Earthling Tour. A live version recorded at BBC Radio Theatre, London, on 27 June 2000, was released on the bonus disc accompanying the first releases of Bowie at the Beeb in 2000. This version contains an extended opening featuring acoustic guitar. Live versions from Bowie's 1999 Hours Tour appear on two posthumous live releases, Something in the Air (Live Paris 99) (2021) and David Bowie at the Kit Kat Klub (Live New York 99) (2021).

== Personnel ==
- David Bowie: vocals, ARP synthesiser
- Ricky Gardiner: lead guitar
- Carlos Alomar: rhythm guitar
- Brian Eno: EMS Synthi AKS synthesiser, guitar treatments
- George Murray: bass guitar
- Roy Young: piano, organ
- Dennis Davis: drums

== Sources ==
- Greatorex, Johnathan. "Just a Mortal With Potential". Teenage Wildlife. November 1996. 6 March 2006 <https://web.archive.org/web/20060203174254/http://www.teenagewildlife.com/Interact/fc/misc/JG/index.html>.
- Griffin, R. "Low". Bowie Golden Years. January 2005. 6 March 2006 <https://web.archive.org/web/20170228035917/http://www.bowiegoldenyears.com/low.html>.
