= Holly Palmer =

American singer-songwriter (born 1971)

Holly Palmer (born c. 1971) is an American singer-songwriter based in Los Angeles, California. She has released five albums as a solo artist, and has toured extensively as a vocalist with acts including David Bowie and Gnarls Barkley. She is also the "Cheesecake" partner in Bubbles & Cheesecake, an Internet-based, multi-media collaboration with multi-disciplinary artist Allee Willis. Other musicians with whom she has collaborated include Paula Cole, Dr. Dre, Billy Preston, Dave Navarro and Michael Bublé, among others.

== Early years ==
Palmer was born in Santa Monica, California and grew up primarily in Redmond, Washington, near Seattle.

Growing up, Palmer played the family piano whenever possible, and played the flute in a school music ensemble. In the eighth grade, she switched to the saxophone so that she could sing with the school's jazz band. She soon began singing standards with the group, and became inspired by jazz singer Sarah Vaughan, whose innovative interpretations would make an enormous mark on Palmer's style. After high school, Palmer attended Pacific Lutheran University in Tacoma, Washington before making her way to Boston, Massachusetts to stay with a friend. She attended and graduated from Berklee College of Music.

== Music career ==
Palmer started playing live gigs during the period she lived in Boston. She particularly enjoyed stripped-down shows at small clubs, and she still loves intimate engagements offering the opportunity for spontaneous chemistry with the audience. Also during her time in Boston, Palmer began to seriously delve into songwriting, and landed a demo deal with Island Records.

Palmer relocated to New York City (where she still performs regularly) in the mid-'90s. She recorded her self-titled 1996 debut album Holly Palmer, produced by Kenny White, which came out on Reprise Records, a Warner Bros. Records-affiliated label, and met with a positive response from critics, and featured contributions from Bill Frisell and John Leventhal. Surrounding its release, Holly toured the U.S. and Europe opening for artists including k.d. lang, Shawn Colvin and Paula Cole. In 1998, Holly went to London and began recording what was intended to be her second disc for the label, Tender Hooks, with producer Howie B, who has also produced albums with U2, Björk, and Robbie Robertson. She finished the album back in NYC with David Kahne (Regina Spektor, Sublime, The Bangles) producing two tracks. She amicably parted ways with Reprise, though, and the album remained unreleased for the time being.

In 1999, David Bowie invited Palmer to sing background vocals on his album Hours; she was featured on the album-opening track "Thursday's Child." Palmer subsequently toured worldwide with Bowie and his band as a vocalist and percussionist throughout 1999–2000.

After completing the Bowie tour in 2000, Palmer settled in Los Angeles, where her music publisher Marla McNally introduced her to Grammy-winning, Emmy and Tony-nominated composer Allee Willis (whose songwriting credits include Earth Wind & Fire's "Boogie Wonderland" and "September", Broadway's "The Color Purple", "I'll Be There for You (Theme from Friends)", etc.). They began a songwriting collaboration, at the time primarily focused on songs for what would be Palmer's next solo album, I Confess. Palmer made a new deal with Tom Whalley and Jeff Ayeroff, the new heads of Warner Bros. for the album's release but, after completing the album, once again, she and the label saw things differently and went their separate ways. This time, Palmer was able to take the masters for both Tender Hooks and I Confess with her.

I Confess album highlights included the single "Just So You Know", a Don Was-produced cover of the Holland-Dozier-Holland classic "You Keep Me Hangin' On" and Dr. Dre's mix of "Jumping Jack". Late, great keyboardist Billy Preston was spotlighted on the track "Down So Low", also featuring Joachim Cooder on drums. Holly launched her own label imprint, Bombshell Records, and independently released both I Confess and Tender Hooks on it in 2004.

During this time, Palmer also recorded "Down with Love", a duet with Canadian pop star Michael Bublé that was the title song for a film starring Renée Zellweger and Ewan McGregor. She was invited into the studio by hip-hop impresario Dr. Dre to record a duet with Mike Elizondo, which has yet to be released. She continued writing material for her next solo album, Songs For Tuesday, as well. Palmer spent most of 2006 on the road as a vocalist with the Gnarls Barkley live band, touring the world in support of their Grammy-winning debut album St. Elsewhere.

At the end of 2006, Palmer returned to Los Angeles to recommence her songwriting partnership with Willis. They originally intended to compose songs for the follow-up to Songs For Tuesday, but instead were inspired to write, perform, and record in full collaboration under the name Bubbles & Cheesecake. The name refers to Willis and Palmer's respective "alter-egos," and their first official single and video as Bubbles & Cheesecake, "It's a Woman Thang", was introduced with the launch of their interactive multi-media website in October 2007. The Willis and Palmer/Bubbles & Cheesecake collaboration encompasses hand-made music, videos, art work, animation, merchandise, online characters, stories, games, all embedded into a social networking initiative.

2007 also marked the release Songs For Tuesday on Bombshell Records. Palmer's fourth solo album, it was recorded live in front of an audience in a Los Angeles recording studio over the course of two days in September 2005. Among its highlights is the Willis-Palmer co-write "Girl in Lust", which, like "I Confess" from Holly's previous album, was later also recorded and performed by Bubbles & Cheesecake.

Palmer co-produced Songs For Tuesday with Joey Waronker (Beck, R.E.M.) – featured on drums – and Justin Meldal-Johnsen (Beck, Macy Gray, Ima Robot), the disc's bassist. The line-up also includes keyboardist Roger Manning (Jellyfish, Beck) and guitarist Lyle Workman (Beck, Todd Rundgren, Sting). Other song highlights include the bluesy "I Love You More Than You'll Ever Know", the pop/R&B-flavored "I Will" (also featured in the 2005 Jessica Alba film Into The Blue), "Your Love Is Gonna Kill Me" and "That's Why They Call It Rome", for which Palmer has also created a video.

Palmer has contributed to a number of other recordings including singing background vocals on Dave Navarro's album Trust No One, writing and performing with Dobie on the track "I'll Be Your Everything" from the electronica compilation Burntprogress 1.1, and doing vocals and percussion on the disc 3 live set of David Bowie's Bowie at the Beeb. Her cover of the Bob Dylan song "All I Really Wanna Do" was included on the Party Of Five soundtrack ('96), and her compositions can also be heard in films including According to Spencer ("Something Else"), Forces of Nature ("A Rose By Any Other Name") and The Price of Kissing ("Scandinavian Ladies").

Palmer co-wrote the theme song to 2013 television series Mob City with Mark Isham entitled "Hello Again" and performed it.

She sang background vocals and played acoustic guitar for Broadway star Idina Menzel (Wicked, Rent) on her I Stand Tour.

== Discography ==
=== Albums ===
- Holly Palmer (1996, Warner Bros. Records)
- Tender Hooks (2004, Bombshell Records)
- I Confess (2004, Bombshell Records)
- Songs for Tuesday (2007, Bombshell Records)
- A Family Album (2017, Bombshell Records)

=== EPs ===
- The Soul of Bubbles & Cheesecake EP (2007, Bubbles & Cheesecake Unlimited)

=== Music videos ===
- "Different Languages"
- "Just So You Know"
- "That's Why They Call It Rome"
- "It's a Woman Thang"
