= Rebel Rebel =

1974 single by David Bowie

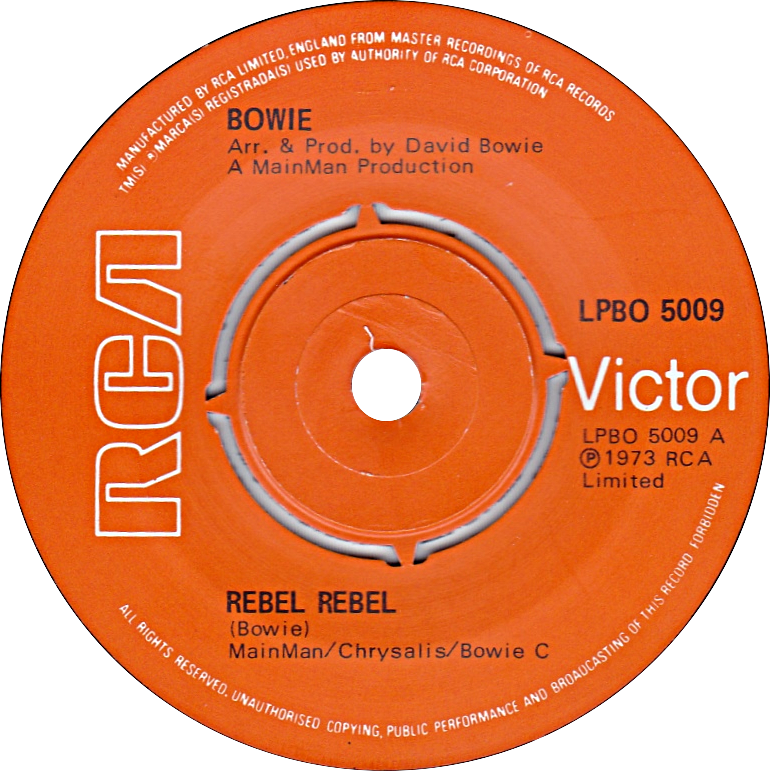
- Side A of the mid-1970s UK vinyl pressing

Single by David Bowie

from the album Diamond Dogs
- B-side: "Queen Bitch"
- Released: 15 February 1974 (UK)
- Recorded: December 1973 – January 1974
- Studio: Trident and Olympic (London); Ludolph (Nederhorst den Berg)
- Genre: Glam rock; proto-punk
- Length: 4:20 (UK single)
- Label: RCA
- Songwriter: David Bowie
- Producer: David Bowie

David Bowie singles chronology
"Sorrow" (1973)	"Rebel Rebel" (1974)	"Rock 'n' Roll Suicide" (1974)

"Rebel Rebel" is a song by the English singer-songwriter David Bowie. It was released in the UK on 15 February 1974 by RCA Records as the lead single from the album Diamond Dogs. Written and produced by Bowie, the song is based around a distinctive guitar riff reminiscent of the Rolling Stones. Cited as his most-covered track, "Rebel Rebel" has been described as Bowie's farewell to the glam rock movement that he had helped initiate, as well as being a proto-punk track. Two versions of the song were recorded: the well-known UK single release and the shorter US single release, which featured added background vocals, extra percussion and a new arrangement.

Upon its release, the song was a commercial success, peaking at number five on the UK Singles Chart and number 64 on the US Billboard Hot 100. The song received critical acclaim for its central guitar riff and strength as a glam anthem. Several publications consider it to be one of Bowie's greatest songs. It was performed live by Bowie during many of his concert tours and since appeared on many compilation albums. It was remastered in 2016 as part of the Who Can I Be Now? (1974–1976) box set.

== Background ==
Originally planned in late 1973 as part of an aborted Ziggy Stardust musical, "Rebel Rebel" was Bowie's last single in his signature glam rock style. It was also his first hit since 1969 not to feature lead guitarist Mick Ronson; Bowie played guitar himself on this and almost all the other tracks on Diamond Dogs, producing what NME critics Roy Carr and Charles Shaar Murray called "a rocking dirty noise that owed as much to Keith Richards as it did to the departed Ronno". Singer-songwriter Jayne County, who was a cast member of Pork and among Bowie's entourage for two years, maintains that her 1973 song "Queenage Baby", which included the lyric "can't tell whether she's a boy or a girl", was an influence for "Rebel Rebel".

== Recording and composition ==
Recording for "Rebel Rebel" began at a solo session at Trident Studios in London in the week after Christmas 1973. It was Bowie's last known visit to Trident, his principal recording studio since 1968. The recording was completed in January 1974 at Ludolph Studios in Nederhorst den Berg, Netherlands. In the studio, Bowie informed bassist Herbie Flowers and guest guitarist Alan Parker that he wanted it to "sound like the Stones", before he picked up Parker's black Les Paul and played it to them. Parker then completed it, before the rest of the backing track was recorded.

According to biographer Marc Spitz, the lyrics of "Rebel Rebel" revisit familiar Bowie territory, featuring "a 'hot' young 'tramp' worrying his or her parents with his or her sexy nihilism", are reflected by the line "You got a few lines and a handful of 'ludes'." Even though the world is ending, the "Rebel" doesn't care, suggesting "we like dancing and we look divine." It also features gender-bending lyrics ("You got your mother in a whirl / She's not sure if you're a boy or a girl"). According to author Peter Doggett, in the context of Diamond Dogs, the song serves as a "musical continuation" between the "Sweet Thing/Candidate/Sweet Thing (Reprise)" medley: it begins with a D to E chord change that was prefigured with a bass guitar slide that constructed the medley's final "chaotic" moments.

The song's distinctive guitar riff is described by rock journalist Kris Needs as "a classic stick-in-the-head like the Stones' 'Satisfaction'". The riff's chords are D, E, and A and were created by Bowie and enhanced by Parker, who, according to Doggett, added the "downward trail" at the end of each line. Paul Trynka writes that Parker added "a particular chord shape rather than the original single note just before the chord change and a distinctive 'beeeoonng' in the last line of the chorus just as [Bowie] sings 'I love you so'." Bowie later said, "It's a fabulous riff! Just fabulous! When I stumbled onto it, it was 'Oh, thank you!'" Parker later said Bowie came up with the Stones-like riff to "piss off" Mick Jagger. Parker was upset upon learning he was uncredited on the final version. He stated: "I can tell my own playing, and my own sound, and I know it's me." Flowers further recalled: "David played the riff to Alan, Alan made sure it was good enough to record, then [Alan] played it." Although O'Leary compliments the riff, he notes that with Ronson's absence, it gets "run into the ground"; throughout the song's over four-minute runtime, the riff is solely absent in the two bridges and the "hot tramp" lines.

== Release ==
"Rebel Rebel" was released on 15 February 1974 in the UK by RCA Records (as LPB05009) as the lead single of Diamond Dogs with the Hunky Dory song "Queen Bitch" as the B-side. The B-side, according to Spitz, was selected by RCA to provide the label with some "much needed fiscal plasma". The single quickly became a glam anthem, the female equivalent of Bowie's earlier hit for Mott the Hoople, "All the Young Dudes". It reached number five on the UK Singles Chart and number 64 on the US Billboard Hot 100.

The original UK single version had a slightly different mix than the album version; the album mix was the only mix to appear on compilation albums, until the single mix appeared on Re:Call 2, as part of the 2016 box set Who Can I Be Now? (1974–1976). The UK single mix was again remastered in 2019 and released on digital media streaming services.

=== US single ===
"Rebel Rebel" was released as a single with a different mix in the US and Mexico in May 1974, with "Lady Grinning Soul" as the B-side. According to Doggett, Bowie was not satisfied with creating an enduring "dance-floor anthem", so he recorded a new mix in New York in April 1974, which Doggett calls a "Latin dub mix" that was over two decades ahead of its time. The US mix is shorter (2:58) and more uptempo, dense and camp than the UK single, featuring "sine waves" of percussion by Geoff MacCormack, an original backing vocal line that is preceded by a "rush of backward echo", acoustic guitar and a new arrangement that buries the signature riff beneath phasing. According to Pegg, the US mix begins at the first "hot tramp" lyric at the 1:20 mark in the original UK mix. Within a couple of months, it was withdrawn and replaced by the UK single version, but the same arrangement was used on Bowie's Diamond Dogs Tour, appearing on its live album David Live (1974).

== Reception ==
The song has received critical acclaim for its guitar riff and strength as a glam anthem, being described as a fitting farewell to Bowie's glam era. Marc Spitz praised the song in the biography Bowie: A Biography, calling the riff "magnificent" and Bowie's "last great glitter anthem". He also described the song as Bowie's most "pure and lasting rocker" when mentioning the artist's early 2000s re-recorded version for his 2003 album Reality. Cash Box said that this was "Bowie's best single ever," describing it as a "strong rocker with incredible hooks throughout." Record World said that Bowie "integrates the aura of the American disco-right on down to castinets into his multi-sensual sound." Stephen Thomas Erlewine of AllMusic, in his review of Diamond Dogs, called the song "tight" and "sexy" and one of Bowie's best, although he felt the song did not contribute to the overall theme of the album. Dave Thompson, also of AllMusic, described "Rebel Rebel" as one of Bowie's most "playful" numbers and considered it a fitting farewell to the artist's glam rock era and, in a way, to "the entire glam movement which Bowie created", as well as indicating the direction his career was taking. Barry Walters of Pitchfork, in a review of Diamond Dogs following Bowie's death, praised the song's "glorious" guitar riff, its "stomping beat", the "hot tramp" lyric pause between both and their "return". Walters continued, "If Bowie often drifted above listeners' heads, here he shoots straight at their solar plexus and scores with what ranks among the greatest, most insistent riffs of the '70s. Rockers who'd dismissed Bowie as a dandy now gave the dude a pass." Journalist C. M. Crockford of punknews.org called "Rebel Rebel"'s guitar riff the best Bowie ever wrote, and a fitting end to his glam rock era.

Following Bowie's death in 2016, Rolling Stone listed "Rebel Rebel" as one of his 30 essential songs. Spencer Kaufman of Ultimate Classic Rock ranked the song at number seven on his list of Bowie's 10 greatest songs, praising its guitar riff – "one of the most recognizable guitar riffs in rock history" – and as a glam rock anthem, writing, "the tune serves as the perfect bridge between the Rolling Stones and punk rock." In 2018, the writers of NME listed "Rebel Rebel" as Bowie's fifth greatest song. They praised the "heaven-sent" riff and also believed it to be reminiscent of the Rolling Stones. Jon Savage of The Guardian, in his list of the 20 best glam-rock songs of all time, ranked the US version of the single at number 18.

== Live performances ==
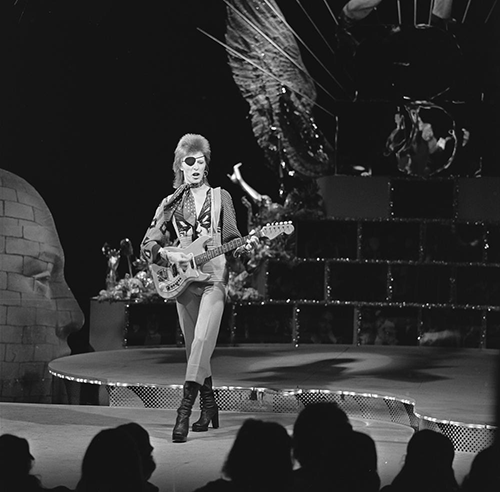
Bowie performing "Rebel Rebel" on AVRO's TopPop in 1974. The song introduced what author Nicholas Pegg called Bowie's short-lived "pirate image".

On 14 February 1974, Bowie recorded a lip synced performance of "Rebel Rebel" at Hilversum's Avro Studio 2 for the Dutch television programme Top Pop. Broadcast two days later, it featured Bowie superimposed over flashing disco lights "by the miracle of chromakey" and donning what Pegg called his short-lived "pirate image" – a spotted neckerchief and a black eye-patch. Bowie later recalled:

I had conjunctivitis, so I made the most of it and dressed like a pirate. Just stopped short of the parrot! I had this most incredible jacket that I was wearing that night. It was a bottle-green bolero jacket that Freddi [Burretti] made for me and he got an artist to paint, using the appliqué technique, this supergirl from a Russian comic on the back. Anyway, I did a press conference and performed 'Rebel Rebel' on Dutch television with a bright red Fender Stratocaster. But I took the jacket off during the press conference and somebody stole it. I was really pissed off.

Following the performance, the pirate look, along with the Ziggy Stardust hairstyle, was ditched in favour of the "swept-back parting and double-breasted suits" of the Diamond Dogs Tour. The Top Pop clip later became the song's semi-official video.

The song was a standard of Bowie's concerts from the Diamond Dogs Tour to the Sound+Vision Tour. For his performance at Live Aid in 1985, Bowie performed a saxophone-heavy version. After retiring the song on his Sound+Vision Tour in 1990, Bowie restored "Rebel Rebel" for the "Hours..." Tour. In early 2003, he recorded a new version, featuring an arrangement by Mark Plati without the original's reference to quaaludes. This was issued on a bonus disc that came with some versions of Reality the same year and on the 30th Anniversary Edition of Diamond Dogs in 2004. In 2004 the track was blended in a mash-up with the Reality song "Never Get Old"; the result was issued as the single "Rebel Never Gets Old".

"We love David Bowie", commented Jane's Addiction front-man Perry Farrell in 2001. "Given the length of his career, I'm stunned that he still pushes things musically. But, please, please, David, can you sing 'Rebel Rebel' still?"

Live versions of the song by Bowie have been released on David Live, A Reality Tour (recorded 2003), Cracked Actor (Live Los Angeles '74), Live Nassau Coliseum '76, Welcome to the Blackout (Live London '78), Glastonbury 2000, Serious Moonlight (Live '83) and Glass Spider (Live Montreal '87), which were both part of the box set Loving the Alien (1983–1988), and I'm Only Dancing (The Soul Tour 74).

== Legacy ==
"Rebel Rebel" has appeared on several compilation albums, the first being ChangesoneBowie in 1976. It was also remastered in 2016, along with the entire Diamond Dogs album, as part of the Who Can I Be Now? (1974–1976) box set. The rare US single version was included on Sound + Vision, the bonus disc of the 30th Anniversary Edition of Diamond Dogs, and Re:Call 2. The song's original UK single mix appeared on Re:Call 2; however, it was sourced not from the original analog tape, but rather from a pristine 7-inch single, as the tape was thought to be lost. The original single mix was released again on 24 May 2019 to commemorate the 45th anniversary of the Diamond Dogs album, this time sourced from the original tape, which had been recovered since the release of Who Can I Be Now?

The track is cited by Nicholas Pegg as Bowie's most-covered track. A cover version by Dead or Alive was released as a single in 1994, under the name International Crysis, and peaked at number 76 on the UK Singles Chart. American country music singer Chris Young sampled the song's guitar riff for his 2023 single "Young Love & Saturday Nights".

== Track listing ==
All songs written by David Bowie.

1. "Rebel Rebel" – 4:20
2. "Queen Bitch" – 3:13

The U.S. version of the single, also released in Canada and Mexico, had "Lady Grinning Soul" as the B-side.

== Personnel ==
According to Kevin Cann:

- David Bowie – vocals, lead guitar, producer
- Alan Parker – rhythm guitar
- Herbie Flowers – bass
- Mike Garson – piano
- Aynsley Dunbar – drums

== Charts ==
=== Weekly charts ===
David Bowie version
Chart (1974)	Peak position
Australia (Kent Music Report)	28
Belgium (Ultratop 50 Wallonia)	6
Canada (RPM)	30
Denmark (Årets Singlehitliste)	2
Dutch Singles Chart	8
Finnish Singles Chart	7
French Singles Chart	7
German Singles Chart	33
Ireland (IRMA)	2
Netherlands (Dutch Top 40)	12
New Zealand (Listener)	19
Norway (VG-lista)	9
UK Singles Chart	5
US Billboard Hot 100	64
US Billboard Rock Songs	16
US Cash Box Top 100	53

Chart (2016)	Peak position
Sweden Heatseeker (Sverigetopplistan)	14
UK Singles Chart	65

Dead or Alive (under the moniker "International Crysis")
Chart (1994)	Peak position
Australia (ARIA Charts)	97
UK Singles Chart	76

== Certifications ==
Region	Certification	Certified units/sales
Italy (FIMI)	Gold	25,000^{‡}
New Zealand (RMNZ)	2× Platinum	60,000^{‡}
Spain (Promusicae)	Gold	30,000^{‡}
United Kingdom (BPI)	Platinum	600,000^{‡}
^{‡} Sales+streaming figures based on certification alone.
