= Mark Plati =

American musician, record producer, and songwriter

Mark Plati is a New York–based musician, record producer, and songwriter, best known for his work in the 1990s with David Bowie.

== Early life and education ==
Plati grew up in Aurora, Colorado. He studied at Indiana University's Jacobs School of Music's audio technology program, and gained a bachelor's degree in telecommunications, an associate's degree in audio technology and a minor in music.

== Career ==
Upon graduating, Plati spent just over a year working at a recording studio in Dallas, Texas, before moving to New York City, where he became a remixer and programmer at another recording studio. His first major booking was working with Prince at his Paisley Park studio. He met David Bowie by "happy accident" a short while later, the beginning of a fruitful partnership. Plati co-produced Bowie's 1997 Earthling album.

Plati has worked with Roger Waters Spookey Ruben, The Cure, Duncan Sheik, Hooverphonic, Robbie Williams, Joe McIntyre, Dave Navarro, Lou Reed, Fleetwood Mac, Deee-Lite, and Natalie Imbruglia, Sam Moore, Bobbejaan Schoepen. He has also worked in France and Belgium with artists like Kyo, Louise Attaque, les Rita Mitsouko, Alain Bashung, Émilie Simon, Saule, Raphael, Axelle Red.

As of 2025, Plati is owner of Alice Michael Music Inc.

== See also ==
- David Bowie: Finding Fame
- Rock 'n' Roll Guns for Hire: The Story of the Sidemen
