= Golden Reel Awards 2022 =

Sound editing awards

70th Golden Reel Awards
- Date: February 26, 2023
- Location: Wilshire Ebell Theatre, Los Angeles, California, U.S.
- Presented by: Motion Picture Sound Editors
- Hosted by: Patton Oswalt

Highlights
- Feature Dialogue and ADR: The Banshees of Inisherin
- Feature Effects and Foley: Top Gun: Maverick

The 70th Golden Reel Awards, presented by the Motion Picture Sound Editors (M.P.S.E.), honored the best in sound editing for film, television, gaming and student productions in 2022. The ceremony was held on February 26, 2023, at the Wilshire Ebell Theatre in Los Angeles. For the first time in three years, the awards ceremony was held live and featured special features to celebrate the sound organization's platinum anniversary.

The nominations were announced on January 9, 2023. The film Everything Everywhere All at Once, the television series The Lord of the Rings: The Rings of Power and Stranger Things, and the video games Call of Duty: Modern Warfare II, God of War Ragnarök and Horizon Forbidden West led the nominations with three each.

American producer Jerry Bruckheimer and supervising sound editor Gwendolyn Yates Whittle received the Filmmaker Award and Career Achievement Award, respectively; actor Tom Cruise presented the latter. Actor and comedian Patton Oswalt hosted the ceremony.

== Winners and nominees ==
The winners are listed first and in bold.

=== Film ===
Outstanding Achievement in Sound Editing – Feature Dialogue / ADR	Outstanding Achievement in Sound Editing – Feature Effects / Foley
**The Banshees of Inisherin – Joakim Sundström (supervising sound editor); Simon Chase (supervising ADR editing); Rebecca Glover (supervising Foley editor); Julien Naudin (Foley artist)**; The Batman – Douglas Murray, William Files (supervising sound editors); Jacob Riehle (dialogue editor); Bobbi Banks, David V. Butler (ADR editors); Elvis – Wayne Pashley (supervising sound editor); Derryn Pasquill (supervising dialogue editor); Libby Villa (ADR supervisor); Nick Breslin, Marisa Marsionis, Lauren Ligovich (dialogue editors); Empire of Light – Oliver Tarney, Rachael Tate (supervising sound editors); Everything Everywhere All at Once – Brent Kiser (supervising sound editor); Top Gun: Maverick – Bjørn Ole Schroeder, James Mather, Al Nelson (supervising sound editor); Chris Gridley, Simon Chase, Matthew Hartman, Michael Maroussas, Gwendolyn Yates Whittle (dialogue editors); Gwendolyn Yates Whittle (ADR editor)	**Top Gun: Maverick – Al Nelson, James Mather, Bjørn Ole Schroeder (supervising sound editors); Christopher Boyes, Jed Loughran (sound designers); Benjamin A. Burtt, Scott Guitteau, Rowan Watson, Qianbaihui Yang (sound effects editor); Luke Dunn Gielmuda (supervising Foley editor); Dmitri Makarov, David Mackie (Foley editors); Jana Vance, Ronni Brown, John Roesch, Shelley Roden (Foley artists)**; Avatar: The Way of Water – Christopher Boyes (supervising sound editor); David Chrastka, Dave Whitehead, Christopher Boyes (sound designers); Hayden Collow, Matt Stutter (sound effects editors); Brent Burge (supervising effects editor); Craig Tomlinson, Dee Selby (Foley editors); Dan O'Connell, John Cucci (Foley artist); The Batman – Will Files, Douglas Murray (supervising sound editor); Chris Terhune, Lee Gilmore, Craig Henighan (sound designers); Diego Perez, Phil Barrie (sound effects editors); Everything Everywhere All at Once – Brent Kiser (supervising sound editor); Jurassic World Dominion – Al Nelson, Gwendolyn Yates Whittle (supervising sound editors); Pete Horner, Gary Rydstrom (sound designers); Stuart McCowan, Benjamin A. Burtt, Scott Guitteau, Qianbaihui Yang (sound effects editor); Luke Dunn Gielmuda (supervising Foley editor); Coya Elliott (Foley editor); Jana Vance, Ronni Brown (Foley artists); Nope – Johnnie Burn (supervising sound editor); Simon Carroll, Brendan Feeney, Max Behrens, Ben Gulvin, Jeff Smith, Beresford Cookman (sound effects editors); Natalia Lubowiecka, Ewa Mazurkiewicz (Foley editors); Jacek Wisniewski (Foley artist)
Outstanding Achievement in Music Editing – Feature Motion Picture	Outstanding Achievement in Music Editing – Documentary
**Elvis – Evan McHugh (music editor); Jamieson Shaw (supervising music editor); Chris Barrett (scoring editor)**; Everything Everywhere All at Once – Dean Menta, Luke Wilder, Katherine Gordon Miller (music editors); Guillermo del Toro's Pinocchio – Lewis Morison, Eric Caudieux (music editors); Chris Barret (scoring editor); Tár – Gerard McCann (supervising music editor); Whitney Houston: I Wanna Dance with Somebody – James Shirley, Victor Chaga (music editors); John Warhurst (supervising music editor); Nina Hartstone (supervising sound editor)	**Moonage Daydream – Brett Morgen (music editor); John Warhurst (supervising music editor)**; Louis Armstrong's Black and Blues – Louie Schultz, Jordan Wiggins, Alex Carr-Engler (music editors); My Life as a Rolling Stone: Mick Jagger – Ben Newth, Nick Ashe (supervising music editors); The Way Down: "Revelations" – Richard David Brown (supervising music editor)
Outstanding Achievement in Sound Editing – Feature Documentary	Outstanding Achievement in Sound Editing – Feature Animation
**Good Night Oppy – Mark Mangini (supervising sound editor); Tim Walston, Dave Whitehead, Mark Mangini (sound designers); Dave Bach (supervising dialogue editor)**; Louis Armstrong's Black and Blues – Leslie Shatz (supervising sound editor and sound designer); Jon Flores (supervising dialogue editor); Moonage Daydream – Nina Hartstone (supervising sound editor); Samir Foco, James Shirley (sound designers); Louise Burton (sound editor); The Territory – Rune Klausen, Peter Albrechtsen (supervising sound editors and sound designers); Mikkel Nielsen, Tim Nielsen (sound effects editor); Sebastian Vaskio, Guilherme Tortolo Magrin (dialogue editors); Pietu Korhonen (Foley editor); Heikki Kossi (Foley artist)	**Guillermo del Toro's Pinocchio – Scott Martin Gershin (supervising sound editor); Masanobu "Tomi" Tomita, Andrew Vernon, Dan Gamache (sound effects editor); Dan Gamache (dialogue editor); Dan O'Connell, John Cucci (Foley artists)**; DC League of Super-Pets – Bill R. Dean, Ando Johnson (supervising sound editors); Erick Ocampo (sound designer); Chris Battaglia, Kip Smedley (sound effects editors); Stephanie Brown (supervising dialogue editor); Chase Keehn (dialogue editor); Jessie Pariseau (supervising Foley editor); Bruce Tanis (Foley editor); Alyson Dee Moore, Christopher Moriana (Foley artists); Lightyear – Coya Elliott (supervising sound editor); Ren Klyce (sound designer); Kimberly Patrick, Jonathon Stevens, Benjamin A. Burtt (sound effects editor); Cheryl Nardi (dialogue editor); James Spencer, Dee Selby (Foley editors); Shelley Roden, John Roesch (Foley artists); Puss in Boots: The Last Wish – Jason W. Jennings, Julian Slater (supervising sound editor); Tim Walston (sound designer); Ken McGill (sound effects editor); Mia Stewart (dialogue editor); Paul Pirola (supervising Foley editor)
Outstanding Achievement in Sound Editing – Foreign Language Feature
**All Quiet on the Western Front – Frank Kruse (supervising sound editor); Markus Stemler (sound designer); Alexander Buck (supervising dialogue editor); Benjamin Hörbe, Alexander Buck (supervising ARD editors); Thomas Kalbér, Moritz Hoffmeister (ARD editors); Kuen Il Song (Foley editor); Carsten Richter, Daniel Weis (Foley artist)**; Argentina, 1985 – Santiago Fumagalli (supervising sound editor); Juan Ignacio Giobio, Nahuel De Camillis (sound effects editors); Ignacio Seligra (dialogue editor); Nicolás Mannara (Foley editor); Diego Marcone (Foley artist); Stephen M. Davis (music editor); Bardo, False Chronicle of a Handful of Truths – Martín Hernández, Nicolas Becker (supervising sound editor); Ken Yasumoto (sound designer); Alejandro Quevedo, Jaime Sainz, Carolina Santana (sound effects editor); Alitzel Diaz, Daniel Douglass (ADR editors); Valeria López Mancheva, Raynier Hinojosa, Omar Blanco (dialogue editors); Oscar Victoria, Pietu Korhonen, Alan Romero (Foley editors); Heikki Kossi, Alan Romero (Foley artists); EO – Radoslaw Ochnio (supervising sound editor); Radoslaw Ochnio (sound designer); Marta Weronika Weronska (sound editor); Suraj Bardia (Foley editor); The Quiet Girl – Steve Fanagan (supervising sound editor, sound designer, sound effects editor, and Foley editor); Louise Burton (dialogue and ADR editor); Caoimhe Doyle (Foley artist); Triangle of Sadness – Andreas Franck, Bent Holm, Gustav Landbecker, Johannes Dekko, Claes Lundberg, Benny Persson, Daniel Lindvik, Alexander Wunsch, Erik Watland (sound editors); Andreas Franck, Bent Holm (sound designers); Claes Lunderberg, Ulf Olausson (Foley artists)

=== Broadcast media ===
Outstanding Achievement in Sound Editing – Broadcast Long Form Dialogue and ADR	Outstanding Achievement in Sound Editing – Broadcast Long Form Effects and Foley
**The Crown: "Gunpowder" – Lee Walpole (supervising sound editor); Iain Eyre (supervising dialogue editor); Matt Mewett (supervising ADR editing) (Netflix)**; Better Call Saul: "Saul Gone" – Nick Forshager, Kathryn Madsen (supervising sound editors); Jane Boegel (dialogue editor) (AMC); The Lord of the Rings: The Rings of Power: "Udûn" – Robby Stambler, Damian Del Borrello (supervising sound editors); Stefanie Ng (dialogue/ADR supervisor); Ailene Roberts, Ray Beentjes (dialogue editors); Gareth Van Niekirk (ADR group editor) (Prime Video); Severance: "The We We Are" – Jacob Ribicoff (supervising sound editor); David Briggs (ADR editor); Gregg Swiatlowski (dialogue editor) (Apple TV+); Stranger Things: "Chapter Seven: The Massacre at Hawkins Lab" – William Files, Craig Henighan (supervising sound editor); Ryan Cole (dialogue/ADR editor); Korey Pereira, Jill Purdy, David Butler, Polly McKinnon, Rob Chen (dialogue editors) (Netflix)	**Stranger Things: "Chapter Seven: The Massacre at Hawkins Lab" – William Files, Craig Henighan (supervising sound editors); Angelo Palazzo, Ken McGill, Katie Halliday, Lee Gilmore, David Grimaldi, Chris Bonis (sound editors); Steve Baine (Foley artist) (Netflix)**; Andor: "Reckoning" – David Acord, Margit Pfeiffer (supervising sound editors); David Acord (sound designer); J.R. Grubbs (sound effects editor); Shaun Farley (Foley editor); John Roesch, Shelley Roden (Foley artists) (Disney+); Better Call Saul: "Carrot and Stick" – Nick Forshager, Kathryn Madsen (supervising sound editor); Matt Temple, Marc Glassman (sound effects editor); Gregg Barbanell, Alex Ullrich (Foley artists) (AMC); Gaslit – Kevin W. Buchholz, Stefani Feldman (co-supervising sound editors); Dan Kremer, Adam Parrish (sound effects editor); Sam Munoz, Jordan Aldinger (Foley editors); Jacob McNaughton, Noel Vought (Foley artists) (Starz); The Lord of the Rings: The Rings of Power: "Udûn" – Damian Del Borrello, Robby Stambler (supervising sound editors); Paula Fairfield (sound designer); James Miller, Chris Terhune, Gareth Van Niekerk, Ryan A. Sullivan, Goeun Everett (sound editors); Richard Wills, Jonathan Bruce, Amy Barber (Foley editor); Jonathan Bruce (Foley artist) (Prime Video)
Outstanding Achievement in Sound Editing – Non-Theatrical Feature	Outstanding Achievement in Sound Editing – Non-Theatrical Animation
**Prey – Chris Terhune, Will Files (supervising sound editors); James Miller (sound designer); Christopher Bonis, Diego Perez, Lee Gilmore (sound effects editors); Jessie Anne Spence (supervising dialogue editor); David Bach, Korey Pereira (dialogue editors); Nick Seaman, Roni Pillischer (Foley editors); Annie Taylor (supervising Foley editor); Leslie Bloome, Shaun Brennan (Foley artists) (Hulu)**; Pinocchio – Bjørn O. Schroeder, Leff Lefferts (supervising sound editors); Randy Thom (sound designer); Malcolm Fife, Pascal Garneau, Teresa Eckton, Goeun Everett (sound effects editors); James Spencer (dialogue editor); Chris Frazier, Dee Shelby (Foley editors); Christopher Manning (supervising Foley editor); John Roesch, Shelley Roden (Foley artists) (Disney+); Weird: The Al Yankovic Story – Anthony Vanchure (supervising sound editor); Mike James Gallagher (sound designer); Sanaa Kelley, Iris Dutour, Luke Kelley (Foley artists) (The Roku Channel); Women of the Movement – Bobbi Banks (supervising sound editor); Nancy MacCleod (sound effects editor); Fred Stahly (dialogue editor); Sanaa Kelly (Foley artist) (ABC)	**Rise of the Teenage Mutant Ninja Turtles: The Movie – Jeff Shiffman (supervising sound editor); Jessey Drake, Brad Meyer (sound effects editor); Xinyue Yu (dialogue editor); Carol Ma (Foley editor) (Netflix)**; The Ice Age Adventures of Buck Wild – Leff Lefferts (supervising sound editor); Shaun Farley, Chris Manning (sound effects editor); E. Larry Oatfield (dialogue editor); John Roesch, Ronni Brown, Sean England (Foley artist) (Disney+); Jurassic World Camp Cretaceous: "Hidden Adventure" – Rob McIntyre, D.J. Lynch (supervising sound editors); Evan Dockter (sound designer); Adam Cioffi, Ian Nyeste, Cat Gensler, Roger Pallan (sound effects editors); Anna Adams (dialogue editor); Aran Tanchum (Foley editor) (Netflix); Lego Star Wars: Summer Vacation – David W. Collins, Matthew Wood (supervising sound editors); David W. Collins (sound designer); Kevin Bolen, Bill Rudolph (sound effects editors); Eryne Prine (Foley editor); Frank Rinella (Foley supervisor); Margie O'Malley (Foley artist) (Disney+)
Outstanding Achievement in Sound Editing – Broadcast Short Form	Outstanding Achievement in Sound Editing – Broadcast Animation
**The Bear: "Review" – Steve "Major" Giammaria (supervising sound editor); Jonathan Fuhrer (sound effects editor); Evan Benjamin (dialogue editor); Annie Taylor (Foley editor); Leslie Bloome (Foley artist) (Hulu)**; Barry: "710N" – Sean Heissinger, Matthew E. Taylor (supervising sound editors); Rickley W. Dumm (sound designer); Deron Street, Candice Brunello, Charles Campagna (sound effects editor); John Creed (dialogue editor); Darrin Mann (Foley editor); Clay Weber (supervising Foley editor); Alyson Dee Moore, Chris Moriana (Foley artist) (HBO); Only Murders in the Building: "Framed" – Mathew Waters, Danika Wikke (supervising sound editors); Eric Offin (sound effects editor); Borja Sau (supervising dialogue editor); Arno Stephanian (Foley editor); Sanaa Kelley, Adam DeCoster (Foley artists) (Hulu); She-Hulk: Attorney at Law: "Ribbit and Rip It" – Mac Smith (supervising sound editor); Steve Bissinger (sound designer); Tim Farrell, Goeun Everett (sound effects editors); Vanessa Lapato (dialogue/ADR supervisor); Ryan Cota (dialogue editor); Ian Chase (Foley editor); Joel Raabe (Foley supervisor); Sean England, Andrea Gard (Foley artists); Kim B. Christensen (conforming editor) (Disney+); Wild Babies: "Big Families" – Matt Coster (supervising sound editor); Matt Coster, Ben Wood (sound designers); Matt Coster, Ben Wood (sound effects editors); Matt Coster, Ben Wood (Foley editors) (Netflix)	**Love, Death + Robots: "In Vaulted Halls Entombed" – Brad North (supervising sound editor); Antony Zeller (Foley editor); Zane Bruce, Lindsay Pepper (Foley artists) (Netflix)**; Jurassic World Camp Cretaceous: "The Last Stand" – Rob McIntyre, D.J. Lynch (supervising sound editors); Evan Dockter (sound designer); Adam Cioffi (sound effects editor); Anna Adams (dialogue editor); Aran Tanchum (Foley editor); Vincent Guisetti (Foley artist) (Netflix); Tales of the Jedi: "The Sith Lord" – David W. Collins, Matthew Wood (supervising sound editors); Kevin Bolen, Michael Brinkman (sound effects editors); Frank Rinella (Foley supervisor); Margie O'Malley, Andrea Gard, Sean England (Foley artists) (Disney+); Transformers: EarthSpark: "Age of Revolution" – Brad Meyer (supervising sound editor); Natalia Saavedra Brychcy (sound effects editor); Christine Gamache (dialogue editor); Carol Ma (Foley editor) (Paramount+)
Outstanding Achievement in Music Editing – Broadcast Long Form	Outstanding Achievement in Music Editing – Broadcast Short Form
**Stranger Things: "Chapter Nine: The Piggyback" – Lena Glikson, David Klotz (music editor) (Netflix)**; The L Word: Generation Q: "Questions for the Universe" – Sharyn Gersh (supervising music editor) (Showtime); The Lord of the Rings: The Rings of Power: "Alloyed" – Jason Smith, Michael Baber (music editors) (Prime Video); Severance: "The We We Are" – Missy Cohen, Sam Zeines (music editors); Felipe Pacheco (scoring editor) (Apple TV+); Wednesday: "A Murder of Woes" – Michael T. Ryan (music editor) (Netflix); The White Lotus: "Bull Elephants" – Mikael Sandgren (supervising music editor) (HBO)	**Pitch Perfect: Bumper in Berlin: "Torschlusspanik" – Andres Locsey (music editor) (Peacock)**; Love, Death + Robots: "Night of the Mini Dead" – Jeff Charbonneau (music editor) (Netflix); Russian Doll: "Matryoshka" – Georgie Ramsland (music editor) (Netflix); She-Hulk: Attorney at Law: "Is This Not Real Magic?" – Mary Parker, Leah Dennis, Zak Millman (music editors); Anele Onyekwere (supervising music editor) (Disney+)
Outstanding Achievement in Sound Editing – Non-Theatrical Documentary
**Formula 1: Drive to Survive: "Gloves Are Off" – Steve Speed, Nick Fry (supervising sound editors); James Evans (sound designer); Hugh Dwan (sound editor) (Netflix)**; George Carlin's American Dream – Bobby Mackston (supervising sound editor); Matt Temple, Joseph Beshenkovsky (sound effects editors); Miriam Cole (dialogue editor) (HBO Max); Lucy and Desi – Anthony Vanchure, Daniel Pagan (supervising sound editors); Mike James Gallagher (sound effects editor) (Prime Video); Selena Gomez: My Mind & Me – Anthony Vanchure (supervising sound editor); Mike James Gallagher (sound designer); Matt Olivo, Jeff Pitts (sound effects editors); Luke Kelley, Sanaa Kelley (Foley artists) (Apple TV+); Tony Hawk: Until the Wheels Fall Off – John M. Chalfant (supervising sound editor); Chris Goodes (sound effects editor); Andrew Rice (dialogue editor) (HBO Max); Trainwreck: Woodstock '99: "Kerosene, Match. Boom!" – Nas Parkash (supervising sound editor); Will Chapman, Tristan Powell (sound effects editors); Claire Ellis (dialogue editor) (Netflix)

=== Gaming ===
Outstanding Achievement in Sound Editing – Game Dialogue / ADR	Outstanding Achievement in Music Editing – Game Music
**Immortality – Kevin Senzaki, Priscilla Snow (audio directors); Diana Cha (dialogue editor)**; Call of Duty: Modern Warfare II – Stephen Miller (audio director); David Natale (audio dialogue lead); Charles Deenen, Nick Martin (supervising sound editors); Dave Rowe (sr. lead audio designer); Tim Stasica (sr. lead technical audio designer); Chris Egert (expert audio designer); Darrell Tung, Mark Camperell, Kerri Shak, Alex Knickerbocker, Ryan Ongaro, Amanda McDonnell, Charlie Gondak, Robert Weiss, Lenny Bedford, Joseph Mott, Josh Taylor, Michael Jukes, Josh Polhill, Cassie White, Myon Sample (dialogue editor); Michael Spina (expert dialogue designer); Landen Belardes, Alexander Ephraim (sound editors); God of War Ragnarök – Frank Favre (audio director); Jodie Kupsco (supervising dialogue editor); Heather Plunkard, Kevin McClelland, Tyler Held, Bianca Salinas, Dedrick Sarzaba, Jaime Marcelo, Ana Paola Velasquez Barrera, Andrea Contino, Briana Villarreal, Damian O'Sullivan, Monet Gardiner, Seira McCarthy, Shannon Deane, Katelyn Limber (dialogue designers); Kyle Richards, Declan Knapp, Caanan Nathaniel, Dale Curtis, Edward Towers, Paul James, Brad Rees, Helen Miles, James Doyle, James Battley (dialogue editors); Horizon Forbidden West – Jochen Willemsen (dialogue director); Erik Schuring (dialogue designer); Juan Manuel Delfin, Vincent van Rooijen, Nick van Noort, Sander Houtman, Nick Gratwick (dialogue editors)	**God of War Ragnarök – Peter Scaturro, Keith Leary (audio directors); Sonia Coronado (supervising music editor); Yuen Man Chung Kelvin, Glen Andrew Brown, Rob Goodson, Bill Hemstapat, Adam Kallibjian, Collin Lewis, Kory McMaster, Monty Mudd, Kye Sebastian Voce (music editors)**; Call of Duty: Modern Warfare II – Stephen Miller (audio lead); JD Mayer (music director); Dave Rowe (sr. lead audio designer); Tim Stasica (sr. lead technical audio designer); Chris Egert (expert audio designer); Sam Marshall, Raheem Frederick, Nicole Yazmin (music editors); Horizon Forbidden West – Bastian Seelbach (audio director); Lucas van Tol (music supervisor); Bastiaan van Bentum (music integration); Immortality – Priscilla Snow (audio director); Nainita Desai (supervising music editor and scoring editor); Priscilla Snow (music editor, sound and music implementer); Connor Carson, Dylan Nelkin, Lizi Attwood (audio programmer)
Outstanding Achievement in Sound Editing – Game Effects / Foley
**God of War Ragnarök – Frank Favre (audio director); Jeremy Rogers, Michael Kent, Alex Previty, Beau Anthony Jimenez, Bryan Higa, Justin E. Bell, Nick Tomassetti, Stephen Schappler, Aaron Sanchez, Ash Read, Dennis Bestafka, Derrick Espino, Jeshua Whitaker, Lewis Everest, Noburo Masuda, Tsubasa Ito, Samuel Justice, Csaba Wagner, Ben Minto, Chris Sweetman (senior audio artists); Andres Herrera, Chris Kokkinos, Danny Barboza, Danny Hey, Kei Matsuo MPSE, Koji Niikura, Lewis Barn, Maria Rascon, Presley Hynes, Prin Keerasuntonpong, Robert Castro, Satsuki Sato, TJ Schauer, Harry Cohen MPSE, Luke Hatton, Michael Leaning, Barney Oram, Zachary Quarles, Stefan Rutherford, Paul Stoughton, Joe Thom, Graham Donnelly, David Farmer, Eilam Hoffman, Jason W. Jennings, Bryan Jerden, Fred Pearson, Stephano Sanchinelli, Thomas C. Brewer MPSE, Tim Walston (audio artists); Sean LaValle, Cameron Sonju, Daniel Ramos, Enoch Choi, Gavin Booth, Roy Lancaster, Charles Dworetz, Bradley Gurwin, Mallorie Lesher, Dave St. Jean, Klaudia Schaffer, Aaron Cendan, Ashton Faydenko, Jessie Chang, Skylar Chen (technical sound designers); Stepan Boev (audio programmer); Blake Collins, Jeff Gross, Alex Robson (Foley editors); Joanna Fang, Dawn Fintor, Alicia Stevenson (Foley artists)**; Call of Duty: Modern Warfare II – Stephen Miller, Ian Mika, Jonathan Gosselin (audio directors); David Natale (audio lead); Adam Boyd, Bryan O. Watkins, Charles Deenen, Nick Martin (supervising sound editor); Dave Rowe, Jeremiah Sypult (sr. lead audio designer); Tim Stasica (sr. lead technical audio designer); Stuart Provine (principal sound designer); Nicolas Tremblay (principal audio designer); Chris Egert (expert audio designer); Darren Blondin (studio audio designer); John Drelick (lead sound designer); Brian Bibbo, Chris Staples, Corina Bello, Jake Harley, Lee Staples, Tim Schlie, Doug Prior (sr. sound designers); Mathieu Denis (sr. audio designer); Robert Rice (sr. technical audio designer); Darrell Tung (sr. associate technical sound designer); Elise Tankiewic (associate technical sound designer); Jordan Ruhala, Victor Arias, Jim Lecroy, Steven Carroll (associate audio designers); Rudy Duro (audio designer); Alexander Ephraim MPSE, James Evans, Josh Moore, Matt Hall, Chris Terhun, Nick Interlandi, Tory Bader, Michael Krystek, Nick Martin (sound designers); Michael Spina, Landen Belardes, Russel Topal, Igor Comes, Rashaad Wiggins, Jim Schaefer, John Joseph Thomas, Mitchell Osias, Myon Sample (sound editors); Gary Hecker (supervising Foley artist); Randy Singer (Foley editor); Michael Broomberg (Foley artist); Destiny 2: The Witch Queen – Evan Buehler (senior audio lead); Skye Lewin (audio lead); Bryen Hensley, Adam Boyd, Braden Parkes (supervising sound editor); Juan Uribe, Noah Sitrin, Paxson Helgesen, Keith Sjoquist, Zach Thomas, AJ Novak, Eric Moen, Jon Persson, Stosh Tuszynski (sound designers); Alvaro Vela, Lexie Guthan (Foley editors); Transparent Sound, Katie Waters (Foley artists); Horizon Forbidden West – Bastian Seelbach (audio director); Anton Woldhek, Pinar Temiz, Lewis James, Arjen Schut, Ramon Kerstens, Casey Slocum, Dennis Bestafka, Safar Bake, Jon Rook, Justin E. Bell, Aaron Sanchez, Eilam Hoffman, George Vlad, Ash Read (senior audio artists); Lovisa Bergdahl, Jacopo Consonni, Gijs Driesenaar, Robert Castro, Andres Herrera, Maria Rascon, TJ Schauer, David Goll, Lewis Everest, Lewis Barn, Fabio Liutina, Robert Kellough, Graham Donnelly, David Whitehead, Michelle Child, Tobias Poppe, Jonathan Howe (audio artists); Andreas Varga (audio programmer); Nick van Kleef, Ruben Bergshoeff, Ben Pantelis (technical sound designers); Graham Donnelly, Mark Bailey, Shane Rees, Mauricio Nicoli, Emmanuel Gayosso, Tim McCann (Foley editors); Blake Collins, Joanna Fang, Rustam Gimadiyev, Bogdan Zavarzin, David C Hughes, Stephano Sanchinelli, Jesse Barden, Alexis Mondragon, Patrick Lee, Wen Du (Foley artists)

=== Student film ===
Outstanding Achievement in Sound Editing – Student Film (Verna Fields Award)
- **Brutal (National Film and Television School) – Dan Hibbert (supervising sound editor)**
  - Enemy Alien (Australian Film, Television and Radio School) – Jonathan Mendolicchio (supervising sound editor)
  - Ascent (National Film and Television School) – Guldem Masa (supervising sound editor)
  - Entertain Me (Amsterdam University of the Arts) – Sam Titshof (supervising sound editor)
  - Key of See (Savannah College of Art and Design) – Manuel Simon (supervising sound editor); Conor Van Slyke, George Allan (Foley artists)
  - Spring Roll Dream (National Film and Television School) – Carlos Eligio San Juan Juanchi (supervising sound editor)
  - This Is Your Captain Speaking (Amsterdam University of the Arts) – Zoé Beekes (supervising sound editor); Felicia Koolhoven (dialogue editor); Teun Beumer (sound effects editor)
  - Whiteboy (National Film and Television School) – Oliver Mapp (supervising sound editor)
