= Moonage Daydream (soundtrack) =

Soundtrack to the 2022 documentary film Moonage Daydream

Moonage Daydream – A Brett Morgen Film

Soundtrack album by David Bowie
- Released: 16 September 2022
- Genre: Soundtrack
- Length: 2:19:40
- Labels: Rhino; Parlophone
- Producer: Tony Visconti

David Bowie chronology
Toy (2021)	Moonage Daydream (2022)	Rock 'n' Roll Star! (2024)

Singles from Moonage Daydream
- 1. "Modern Love (Moonage Daydream Mix)" Released: 25 August 2022; 2. "D.J. (Moonage Daydream Mix)" Released: 9 September 2022

Moonage Daydream – A Brett Morgen Film is the soundtrack to the 2022 documentary film Moonage Daydream based on the life of English singer-songwriter David Bowie. It was released digitally on 16 September 2022 by Rhino Entertainment and Parlophone Records, followed by a two-disc CD release on 18 November 2022, with a three-disc vinyl edition set for later release in 2023.

== Background ==
The album was announced on 25 August 2022, to accompany the film, that contained previously unreleased live singles, tracks cut from the album, film-specific remixes of Bowie's tracks, orchestral performances and interview excerpts and monologues from Bowie himself. A single from the album – the remixed version of the song "Modern Love" – released on the same date. Bowie's official website, stated it as "This version is a unique mix starting with the isolated piano motif from the track, building up into the chorus before ending on the a cappella backing vocals offering an insight into the individual elements that create the classic we all know and love". The film-specific remix of the song "D.J." was released as the second single on 9 September 2022.

Brett Morgen worked for nearly 18 months to design the accompanying soundtrack, with the sound design team — re-recording mixers Paul Massey and David Giammarco, sound and music editor John Warhurst, supervising sound editor Nina Hartstone — working with him. On designing the film's music, Massey mashed up "a lot of music that wasn't designed to go together into some amazing pieces of work. And the sound design is fully integrated into that. The soundtrack is like a huge dissolve, from the very beginning of the film until the end."

== Reception ==
At the Cannes Film Festival premiere in May 2022, Carey Matthew of Deadline Hollywood called it as "thundering soundtrack that literally shakes the seats". Kenji Fujishima of Slant Magazine wrote "Though Bowie's music dominates the soundtrack (with his songs remixed for maximum heart-thumping arena-rock impact), the documentary also includes music inspired by the man's art, including snippets from the Philip Glass symphonies based on Bowie's Low and Heroes albums." Max Bell of Classic Rock wrote "If it's axiomatic that great artistic careers build to a form of crescendo then this double CD, the official soundtrack to Brett Morgen's anticipated documentary on the musical odyssey of David Bowie, meets that criterion. Morgen's work on Crossfire Hurricane, for the Rolling Stones, and Kurt Cobain: Montage of Heck, persuaded Bowie's estate to give him carte blanche on over fifty years of material, utilising sonic enhancement, mixes that veer from the sublime to the ridiculously sublime, and a spoken word narrative of sorts that threads the meaning of time, death and faith." The album received a nomination for Best Soundtrack at the St. Louis Gateway Film Critics Association Awards 2022.

== Track listing ==
Disc 1
No.	Title	Taken from	Length
1.	"Time... One of the Most Complex Expressions..." (Moonage Daydream Mix 1)	Interview	1:54
2.	"Ian Fish U.K. Heir" (Remix Moonage Daydream Edit)	The Buddha of Suburbia	1:10
3.	"Hallo Spaceboy"	Outside	3:04
4.	"Wild Eyed Boy from Freecloud" (Live; Stereo)	David Bowie	3:19
5.	"All the Young Dudes" (Live; Stereo)	Ziggy Stardust: The Motion Picture	1:38
6.	"Oh! You Pretty Things" (Live; Stereo)	Hunky Dory	1:43
7.	"Life on Mars?" (2016 Mix – Moonage Daydream Edit)	Hunky Dory	3:46
8.	"Moonage Daydream" (Live; Stereo)	The Rise and Fall of Ziggy Stardust and the Spiders from Mars	6:17
9.	"Medley: The Jean Genie / Love Me Do / The Jean Genie" (Live; featuring Jeff Beck)	Aladdin Sane	7:48
10.	"The Light" (Excerpt)	The Light by Philip Glass	4:42
11.	"Warszawa" (Live Moonage Daydream Edit)	Low	3:56
12.	"Quicksand" (2021 Mix – Early Version)	Hunky Dory	4:57
13.	"Medley: Future Legend / Diamonds Dogs Intro / Cracked Actor"	Diamond Dogs / Aladdin Sane	3:57
14.	"Rock 'n' Roll with Me" (Live)	Diamond Dogs	4:47
15.	"Aladdin Sane" (Moonage Daydream Edit)	Aladdin Sane	5:03
16.	"Subterraneans" (2017 Remaster)	Low	5:37
17.	"Space Oddity" (Moonage Daydream Mix)	David Bowie	3:39
18.	"V-2 Schneider" (2017 Remaster)	"Heroes"	3:09
Total length:			1:10:26

Disc 2
No.	Title	Taken from	Length
19.	"Sound and Vision" (Moonage Daydream Mix)	Low	3:09
20.	"A New Career in a New Town" (Moonage Daydream Mix)	Low	2:06
21.	"Word on a Wing" (Moonage Daydream Mix Excerpt)	Station to Station	0:12
22.	""Heroes"" (Live Moonage Daydream Edit)	"Heroes"	5:52
23.	"D.J." (Moonage Daydream Mix)	Lodger	3:48
24.	"Ashes to Ashes" (Moonage Daydream Mix)	Scary Monsters (and Super Creeps)	4:13
25.	"Move On" (Moonage Daydream A Cappella Mix Edit)	Lodger	0:17
26.	"Moss Garden" (Moonage Daydream Edit)	"Heroes"	1:03
27.	"Cygnet Committee" / "Lazarus" (Moonage Daydream Mix)	David Bowie / Blackstar	4:49
28.	"Memory of a Free Festival" (Harmonium Edit)	David Bowie	0:48
29.	"Modern Love" (Moonage Daydream Mix)	Let's Dance	2:59
30.	"Let's Dance"	Let's Dance	3:02
31.	"The Mysteries" (Moonage Daydream Mix)	The Buddha of Suburbia	3:57
32.	"Rock 'n' Roll Suicide" (Live Moonage Daydream Edit)	The Rise and Fall of Ziggy Stardust and the Spiders from Mars	4:12
33.	"Ian Fish U.K. Heir" (Moonage Daydream Mix 2)	The Buddha of Suburbia	3:39
34.	"Word on a Wing" (Moonage Daydream Mix)	Station to Station	4:26
35.	"Hallo Spaceboy" (Live Moonage Daydream Mix)	Outside	3:12
36.	"I Have Not Been to Oxford Town" (Moonage Daydream A Cappella Mix Edit)	Outside	0:12
37.	""Heroes": IV. Sons of the Silent Age" (Excerpt)	"Heroes"	2:21
38.	"Blackstar" (Moonage Daydream Film Mix Edit)	Blackstar	1:38
39.	"Ian Fish U.K. Heir" (Moonage Daydream Mix Excerpt)	The Buddha of Suburbia	0:44
40.	"Memory of a Free Festival" (Moonage Daydream Mix Edit)	David Bowie	3:03
41.	"Starman" (Original Single Mix; 2015 Remaster)	The Rise and Fall of Ziggy Stardust and the Spiders from Mars	4:11
42.	"You're Aware of a Deeper Existence..."	Interview	0:58
43.	"Changes" (2015 Remaster)	Hunky Dory	3:32
44.	"Let Me Tell You One Thing..."	Interview	0:18
45.	"Well, You Know What This Has Been an Incredible Pleasure..."	Interview	0:24
Total length:			1:09:14

== Personnel ==
Credits adapted from CD liner notes.

- Tony Visconti – producer
- John Warhurst, Nina Hartstone – supervising sound engineers
- Bill Stein – re-recording engineer
- Jannek Zechner – mixing engineer
- Brett Morgen – musical mashups design and edit

== Charts ==
Chart performance for Moonage Daydream
Chart (2022–2023)	Peak position
Austrian Albums (Ö3 Austria)	50
Belgian Albums (Ultratop Flanders)	49
Belgian Albums (Ultratop Wallonia)	49
Dutch Albums (Album Top 100)	36
French Albums (SNEP)	125
German Albums (Offizielle Top 100)	72
Hungarian Albums (MAHASZ)	15
Italian Albums (FIMI)	100
Japanese Albums (Oricon)	38
Japanese Hot Albums (Billboard Japan)	59
Scottish Albums (Official Charts)	10
Spanish Albums (Promusicae)	61
Swiss Albums (Schweizer Hitparade)	44
UK Albums (Official Charts)	20

== Release history ==
Release dates and formats for Moonage Daydream
Region	Date	Format(s)	Label	Ref.
Various	16 September 2022	Digital download; streaming	Rhino; Parlophone	
Various	18 November 2022	CD	Rhino; Parlophone	
Various	2023	Vinyl	Rhino; Parlophone	
