= Golden Reel Award for Outstanding Achievement in Sound Editing – Sound Effects, Foley, Music, Dialogue and ADR for Short Form Animation Broadcast Media =

Annual audio award

- Country: United States
- Presented by: Motion Picture Sound Editors
- Currently held by: Brad North, Craig Henighan, Jeff Gross, Dawn Lunsford, Alicia Stevens, Jeff Charbonneau – Love, Death + Robots (2021)

The Golden Reel Award for Outstanding Achievement in Sound Editing – Sound Effects, Foley, Music, Dialogue and ADR for Short Form Animation Broadcast Media is an annual award given by the Motion Picture Sound Editors. It honors sound editors whose work has warranted merit in the field of television; in this case, their work in the field of sound effects and Foley work in short form animated broadcast media.

Three categories once were presented to reward sound editing in short form animated broadcast media, in 1997, Best Sound Editing – Television Animated Specials was presented, the same year, Best Sound Editing – Television Animation – Music and Best Sound Editing – Television Animation – Sound became stables categories with the former being presented until 2003 and the latter becoming the current category, being renamed in 2007.

== Winners and nominees ==
=== 1990s ===
Year	Program	Episode(s)	Nominees	Network
1997	Best Sound Editing – Television Animated Specials			
1997	The Simpsons	"Treehouse of Horror VIII"	Bobby Mackston (supervising sound editor), Travis Powers (supervising sound editor/Foley editor and mixer), Norm MacLeod, Terry Greene (sound effects editors)	Fox
1997	The New Batman Adventures	"World's Finest"	Robert Hargreaves, Mark Keatts (supervising sound editors), Gregory Beaumont, George Brooks (sound effects editors), John Hegedes (dialogue editor), Kelly Ann Foley (ADR editor)	Kids' WB
1997	King of the Hill	"Unbearable Blindness of Laying"		Fox
1997	Best Sound Editing – Television Animation – Music			
1997	101 Dalmatians: The Series	"Mall Pups"	Brian F. Mars (music editor), Dominick Certo (music editor/scoring editor)	ABC
1997	Action League Now!!: Rock-A-Big-Baby			Nickelodeon
1997	The Spooktacular New Adventures of Casper			Fox Kids
1997	Cow and Chicken			Cartoon Network
1997	Dexter's Laboratory			Cartoon Network
1997	King of the Hill			Fox
1997	Best Sound Editing – Television Animated Series – Sound			
1997	Spawn	"End Games"	Craig Berkey (supervising sound editor and sound designer), Deb Adair (adr, dialogue and Foley editor)	HBO
1997	Action League Now!!: Rock-A-Big-Baby			Nickelodeon
1997	Hey Arnold!			Nickelodeon
1997	The Angry Beavers			Nickelodeon
1997	Cow and Chicken			Cartoon Network
1997	The Real Adventures of Jonny Quest			Cartoon Network
1997	Men in Black: The Series			Kids' WB
1997	The New Batman Adventures			Kids' WB
1998	Best Sound Editing – Television Animation – Music			
1998	Toonsylvania	"My Fair Monster"	Jay Duerr, Terry Reiff, Gary Falcone (music editors), Lisle Leete (music and scoring editor)	Fox Kids
1998	Toonsylvania	"Doom with a View"	Jay Duerr, Terry Reiff, Gary Falcone (music editors), Lisle Leete (music and scoring editor)	Fox Kids
1998	Action League Now!!: Rock-A-Big-Baby			Nickelodeon
1998	Hey Arnold!			Nickelodeon
1998	Cow and Chicken			Cartoon Network
1998	The Simpsons			Fox
1998	Invasion America			The WB
1998	Hercules			Syndication
1998	Best Sound Editing – Television Animated Series – Sound			
1998	Spawn	"Send in the Kkklowns"	Deb Adair (supervising sound editor), Sean Garnhart, Craig Berkey (sound effects editors)	HBO
1998	Cow and Chicken			Cartoon Network
1998	Men in Black: The Series			Kids' WB
1998	Invasion America			The WB
1998	Oh Yeah! Cartoons	"Fathead", "Planet Kate"		Nickelodeon
1998	Oh Yeah! Cartoons	"F Tales", "25 Cent Trouble", "Cat and Milkman"		Nickelodeon
1998	RoboCop			Syndication
1998	Voltron: The Third Dimension			Syndication
1999	Best Sound Editing – Television Animation – Music			
1999	SpongeBob SquarePants	"Mermaid Man and Barnacle Boy", "Pickles"	Nick Carr (music editor), Timothy J. Borquez (re-recording music mixer)	Nickelodeon
1999	Cow and Chicken	"I Am Weasel", "Skating Fools", "He Said, He Said"	Roy Braverman (music editor)	Cartoon Network
1999	Mickey Mouse Works	"Goofy's Big Kitchen/Daisy's Road Trip/Relaxing With Vonpigke"	William Griggs, Jason Oliver (music editors), Liz Lachman (music editor/scoring editor)	ABC
1999	The Simpsons	"Wild Barts Can't Be Broken"	Chris Ledesma (music editor)	Fox
1999	The Simpsons	"Treehouse of Horror X"	Bob Beecher (music editor)	Fox
1999	The New Woody Woodpecker Show	"Mirage Barrag", "Queen of De-Nile", "Party Animal"	Charlie King (music editor)	Fox Kids
1999	Timon & Pumbaa	"Steel Hog", "Dealers Cut Choice"	Brian F. Mars (music editor), Liz Lachman (music editor/scoring editor)	Syndication
1999	Timon & Pumbaa	"Hot Air Buffons"	Fil Brown (music editor), Liz Lachman (scoring editor)	Syndication
1999	Best Sound Editing – Television Animated Series – Sound			
1999	SpongeBob SquarePants	"Karate Choppers"	Timothy J. Borquez (supervising sound editor/re-recording mixer), Jeff Hutchins (supervising sound editor), Eric Freeman (dialogue editor), Monett Holderer (Foley artist), Timothy J. Garrity (re-recording mixer), Brad Brock (Foley mixer)	Nickelodeon
1999	Courage the Cowardly Dog	"The Duck Brothers", "Shirley The Demon Dog"	Michael Geisler (supervising sound editor), Andrea Lawson (supervising Foley editor), Peter Roos (supervising dialogue editor), Norval D. Crutcher III, Stuart Ablaza, Jason Piatt, Glenn Oyabe, Elliott Koretz (sound editors)	Cartoon Network
1999	Family Guy	"Da Boom"	Bob Newlan (supervising sound/Foley/dialogue/ADR editor), Helen Luttrell (Foley editor/dialogue editor), Andrew Ellerd (Foley editor)	Fox
1999	Mickey Mouse Works	"Hungarian Dance", "How to Be a Spy", "Donald's Valentine Dollar", "Pluto's Kittens"	Jennifer Mertens, William Griggs (supervising sound editors), Bill Kean, Jason Oliver, Otis Van Osten, David Lynch (sound editors)	ABC
1999	Oh Yeah! Cartoons	"The Fairly OddParents", "Herb", "Jamal the Funny Frog"	Michael Warner (supervising sound editor), Kris Daly (supervising Foley editor), Robbi Smith (supervising dialogue editor)	Nickelodeon
1999	The Angry Beavers	"Stare And Stare Alike", "I Am Not An Animal, I Am Scientist"	Timothy J. Borquez (supervising sound editor), Eric Freeman, Thomas Syslo (Foley editors/dialogue editors)	Nickelodeon
1999	Roughnecks: Starship Troopers Chronicles	"Swarm"	Robert Duran (supervising sound editor), Robbi Smith (supervising dialogue editor), Robert Poole II (sound editor)	Syndication
1999	Timon & Pumbaa	"War Hogs", "The Big No Sleep"	Jennifer Mertens (supervising sound editor), Charles Rychwalski, Eric Hertsguaard, Rick Hammel, Kenneth Young, David Lynch (sound editors)	Syndication

=== 2000s ===
Year	Program	Episode(s)	Nominees	Network
2000	Best Sound Editing – Television Animation – Music			
2000	Mickey Mouse Works	"Donald's Lighthouse", "How to Take Care of Your Yard"	Jason Oliver (music editor), Liz Lachman (scoring editor)	ABC
2000	Buzz Lightyear of Star Command	"Return to Karn"	Brian F. Mars (music editor), Dominick Certo (music editor/scoring editor)	UPN, ABC
2000	SpongeBob SquarePants	"Fools in April", "Neptune's Spatula"	Nick Carr (music editor)	Nickelodeon
2000	Pepper Ann	"The Great Beyond", "Jaybirds of a Feather"	Nick Carr (music editor), Liz Lachman (scoring editor)	ABC
2000	The Simpsons	"Last Tap Dance in Springfield"	Bob Beecher (music editor)	Fox
2000	Best Sound Editing – Television Animated Series – Sound			
2000	Courage the Cowardly Dog	"Courage In The Big Stinkin' City"	Michael Geisler (supervising sound editor), Peter Roos (supervising dialogue editor), Norval D. Crutcher III, Jason Piatt (sound editors)	Cartoon Network
2000	SpongeBob SquarePants	"Rock Bottom", "Arrgh"	Timothy J. Borquez (supervising sound editor/re-recording mixer), Jeff Hutchins (supervising sound editor), Eric Freeman (sound editor/re-recording mixer), Roy Braverman (sound editor), Gabriel Rosas (dialogue editor), Monett Holderer (Foley artist), Andrea Lawson (mixer)	Nickelodeon
2000	Buzz Lightyear of Star Command	"Enemy Without a Face"	Jennifer Mertens, Michael Gollom (supervising sound editors), Otis Van Osten, Rick Hammel (sound editors), Eric Hertsguaard (dialogue editor)	UPN, ABC
2000	Family Guy	"He's Too Sexy for His Fat"	Bob Newlan (supervising sound editor), Andrew Ellerd, Erik Aadahl, Michael Babcock, Jeff Sawyer (sound editors), Helen Luttrell (Foley editor/dialogue editor)	Fox
2000	Johnny Bravo	"Johnny Bravo Affair", "Biosphere Johnny", "Spa Spaz"	Glenn Oyabe (supervising sound editor/supervising Foley editor), Kerry Iverson (supervising dialogue editor), Jesse Arruda, John Bires (sound editors)	Cartoon Network
2000	Max Steel	"Steel vs. Steel"	Michael Warner (supervising sound editor), Kris Daly (supervising Foley editor), Roshaun Hawley (supervising dialogue editor)	Kids' WB
2000	Mickey Mouse Works		Jennifer Mertens (supervising sound editor), Michael Gollom, Bill Kean, Otis Van Osten (sound editors), Jason Oliver (dialogue editor)	ABC
2000	Roughnecks: Starship Troopers Chronicles	"Metamorphosis"	Robert Duran (supervising sound editor), Robert Poole II (sound editor), Kris Daly (Foley editor), Robbi Smith (dialogue editor)	Syndication
2001	Best Sound Editing – Television Animation – Music			
2001	The Cramp Twins		Michael Geisler, Ernie Mannix (music editors)	Cartoon Network
2001	House of Mouse	"Pit Crew", "Golf Nut Donald"	Jason Oliver (music editor), Liz Lachman (scoring editor)	ABC
2001	Teacher's Pet	"One Dog's Junk"	Marc S. Perlman (music editor)	ABC
2001	The Weekenders	"Clown – Testing Dixon"	Marc S. Perlman (music editor)	ABC
2001	Men in Black: The Series	"The End Game Syndrome, Part II"	Marc S. Perlman (music editor)	Kids' WB
2001	Dexter's Laboratory	"Momdark", "Quackor" and "Mind Over Chatter"	Roy Braverman, William Griggs (music editors)	Cartoon Network
2001	SpongeBob SquarePants	"Jelly Fish Hunter", "The Frycook Games"	Nick Carr (music editor)	Nickelodeon
2001	The Legend of Tarzan	"Leopardmen Rebellion"	Dominick Certo, Steve Dierkens (music editors)	UPN
2001	Best Sound Editing – Television Animated Series – Sound			
2001	SpongeBob SquarePants	"Secret Box", "Band Geeks"	Timothy J. Borquez (supervising sound editor/re-recording mixer), Jeff Hutchins (supervising sound editor), Daisuke Sawa (sound editor)	Nickelodeon
2001	Grim & Evil	"Smell of Vengeance", Parts I and II, "Friend"	Glenn Oyabe (supervising sound editor), Jesse Arruda (supervising Foley editor), Rob Desales (supervising dialogue editor)	Cartoon Network
2001	Justice League	"In the Blackest Night, Part II"	Robert Hargreaves (supervising sound editor), Mark Keatts (supervising dialogue editor), Kelly Ann Foley (supervising ADR editor), George Brooks (sound effects editor)	Cartoon Network
2001	Heavy Gear: The Animated Series	"Mega Duel"	Robert Poole II (supervising sound editor), Robbi Smith (supervising dialogue editor)	Syndication
2001	Invader Zim	"The Nightmare Begins"	Joe Pizzulo, Gary Falcone (supervising sound editors), Jeremy Pitts (supervising Foley editor), Devon Bowman (supervising dialogue editor/supervising ADR editor), Mark Allen (sound effects editor), Paul Menichini (sound effects designer), Matt Brown (ADR/dialogue editor)	Nickelodeon
2001	Max Steel	"The Race"	Michael Warner (supervising sound editor), Roshaun Hawley (supervising dialogue editor)	Kids' WB
2001	The Mummy	"The Summoning"	Robert Poole II (supervising sound editor), Robbi Smith (supervising dialogue editor), Chris Eaton (dialogue editor)	Kids' WB
2001	X-Men: Evolution	"Adrift"	Robert Hargreaves (supervising sound editor), George Brooks (sound effects editor), Giovanni Moscardino (dialogue editor)	Kids' WB
2001	When Dinosaurs Roamed America		Michael Payne (supervising sound editor), Jonathan Sola (sound effects editor), David Esparza (sound effects editor), Nancy Nugent (Foley editor)	Discovery Channel
2001	The Legend of Tarzan	"Leopardmen Rebellion"	Michael Gollom, Jennifer Mertens (supervising sound editors), Jason Oliver (supervising dialogue editor), Eric Hertsguaard (dialogue editor), Otis Van Osten, Rick Hammel, David Lynch (sound effects editors)	UPN
2002	Best Sound Editing – Television Animation – Music			
2002	SpongeBob SquarePants	"Wet Painters", "Krusty Krab Training Video"	Nick Carr (music editor)	Nickelodeon
2002	Grim & Evil	"Little Rock of Horrors", "The Pie Who Loved Me", "Dream a Little Dream"	Glenn Oyabe (music editor)	Cartoon Network
2002	The Simpsons	"Large Marge"	Glenn Oyabe (music editor)	Fox
2002	Best Sound Editing – Television Animated Series – Sound			
2002	SpongeBob SquarePants	"Nasty Patty", "Idiot Box"	Timothy J. Borquez (supervising sound editor/re-recording mixer), Jeff Hutchins (supervising sound editor), Tony Ostyn, Daisuke Sawa (dialogue editors)	Nickelodeon
2002	Legend of the Lost Tribe		Gary Falcone, Joe Pizzulo (supervising sound editors), James Mather (supervising dialogue editor), Devon Bowman (supervising ADR editor), Joseph Stracey (dialogue editor), Tim Owens (sound effects editor), Gregory Cathcart (ADR editor)	CBS
2002	Courage the Cowardly Dog	"The Tower of Dr. Zalost"	Michael Geisler (supervising sound editor), Peter Roos (supervising dialogue editor), Jason Piatt, Norval D. Crutcher III (sound editors)	Cartoon Network
2002	He-Man and the Masters of the Universe	"Dragon's Blood"	Rick Hinson (supervising sound editor), Elizabeth Hinson, Gregory Cathcart (sound editors)	Cartoon Network
2002	Justice League	"Savage Time, Part I"	Robert Hargreaves (supervising sound editor), Mark Keatts (supervising dialogue editor), George Brooks (sound effects editor), Kelly Ann Foley (dialogue editor)	Cartoon Network
2002	The Fairly OddParents	"Action Packed", "Smarty Pants"	Michael Warner (supervising sound editor), Mary Erstad (supervising Foley editor), Matt Corey (supervising dialogue editor), Michael Petak (dialogue editor)	Nickelodeon
2002	Static Shock	"The Big Leagues"	Glenn Oyabe, Joe Sandusky (supervising sound editors), Jesse Arruda (supervising Foley editor), Mark Keatts (supervising dialogue editor/supervising ADR editor), Kelly Ann Foley (sound editor)	Kids' WB
2002	X-Men: Evolution	"Day of Recovery"	Robert Hargreaves (supervising sound editor), George Brooks (sound effects editor), Giovanni Moscardino (dialogue editor)	Kids' WB
2003	Best Sound Editing – Television Animation – Music			
2003	SpongeBob SquarePants	"The Great Snail Race", "Mid-life Crustacean"	Nick Carr (music editor)	Nickelodeon
2003	Dexter's Laboratory	"Dexter's Wacky Races"	Brian F. Mars, Roy Braverman (music editors)	Cartoon Network
2003	Johnny Bravo	"Valentine's Special"	Roy Braverman (music editor)	Cartoon Network
2003	Lilo & Stitch: The Series	"Sprout"	Jason Oliver, Steve Dierkens (music editors)	Disney Channel
2003	¡Mucha Lucha!	"The Littlest Luchadores"	Nick Carr (music editor)	Kids' WB
2003	Best Sound Editing – Television Animated Series – Sound			
2003	The Adventures of Jimmy Neutron, Boy Genius	"Operation Rescue Jet Fusion"	Gary Falcone, Jason Stiff, Paul Menichini (supervising sound editors), Jeffrey Kettle (supervising Foley editor), Gregory Cathcart (sound effects/Foley editor), Michael Petak (dialogue editor)	Nickelodeon
2003	Dinosaur Planet	"Alpha's Egg", "Pod's Travels"	Michael Payne (supervising sound editor), Stephen P. Robinson, David Esparza, Nancy Nugent, Patrick Cusack, Lisa Varetakis (sound editors)	Discovery Channel
2003	He-Man and the Masters of the Universe	"Of Machines and Men"	Rick Hinson (sound designer), Elizabeth Hinson, Gregory Cathcart (sound editors)	Cartoon Network
2003	Justice League	"Twilight, Part II"	Robert Hargreaves (supervising sound editor), Mark Keatts (supervising dialogue editor), George Brooks (sound effects editor), Mark Keefer, Kelly Ann Foley, Kerry Iverson (dialogue editors)	Cartoon Network
2003	Teen Titans	"The Apprentice, Part II"	Robert Hargreaves (supervising sound editor), Mark Keatts (supervising dialogue editor), George Brooks, Robert Duran (sound effects editors), Mark Keefer, Kelly Ann Foley, Kerry Iverson (dialogue editors)	Cartoon Network
2003	The Fairly OddParents	"The Crimson Chin Meets Mighty Mom and Dyno Dad"	Robert Poole II (sound designer), Mary Erstad (supervising Foley editor), Matt Corey (supervising dialogue editor)	Nickelodeon
2003	SpongeBob SquarePants	"Mid-life Crustacean"	Timothy J. Borquez, Jeff Hutchins (supervising sound editors), Tony Ostyn (supervising dialogue editor), Eric Freeman, Thomas Syslo (sound editors)	Nickelodeon
2003	Xiaolin Showdown		Thomas Syslo, Timothy J. Borquez (supervising sound editors), Mark Keatts (supervising dialogue editor), Kerry Iverson (supervising ADR editor), Eric Freeman (sound editor)	Kids' WB
2004	Best Sound Editing – Television Animated Series – Sound			
2004	The Adventures of Jimmy Neutron, Boy Genius	"The N Men"	Jason Stiff, Gary Falcone (supervising sound editors), Jeffrey Kettle (supervising Foley editor), Michael Petak (supervising dialogue editor), Justin Brinsfield (supervising ADR editor), Charlie Brissette (music editor), Paul Menichini (sound effects editor), Tom Maydeck (dialogue editor/Foley editor), Mishelle Fordham (ADR editor)	Nickelodeon
2004	Evil Con Carne	"Jealousy, Jealous Do", "Hector King of the Britons"	Jesse Arruda (supervising sound editor), Glenn Oyabe (supervising Foley editor), Tony Ostyn (supervising dialogue editor)	Cartoon Network
2004	Grim & Evil	"Super Zero", "Sickly Sweet"	Glenn Oyabe (supervising sound editor), Jesse Arruda, Erik Sequeira, Cecil Broughton (sound editors)	Cartoon Network
2004	SpongeBob SquarePants	"Pranks A Lot", "Spongebob Meets the Strangler"	Timothy J. Borquez, Jeff Hutchins (supervising sound editors), Tony Ostyn (supervising dialogue editor), Nick Carr (music editor), Eric Freeman, Thomas Syslo (sound effects editors), Daisuke Sawa (dialogue/Foley editor)	Nickelodeon
2004	The Batman	"The Big Chill"	Thomas Syslo, Timothy J. Borquez (supervising sound editors), Mark Keatts (supervising dialogue editor), Roy Braverman, Jeff Hutchins, Keith Dickens, Eric Freeman, Doug Andham (sound editors), Mark Keefer (dialogue editor), Mike Garcia (ADR editor), Daisuke Sawa (Foley editor)	Kids' WB
2004	Xiaolin Showdown	"Dreamscape"	Thomas Syslo, Timothy J. Borquez (supervising sound editors), Mark Keatts (supervising dialogue editor), Eric Freeman, Daisuke Sawa, Doug Andham, Roy Braverman (sound editors), Mark Keefer (dialogue editor), Mike Garcia (ADR editor)	Kids' WB
2005	Family Guy	"Blind Ambition"	Bob Newlan (supervising sound editor), Stan Jones, Douglas M. Lackey (music editors), Andrew Ellerd (sound/Foley editor), Robert Ramirez (sound editor), Patrick Hogan, Sonya Henry (dialogue/ADR editors), Dale W. Perry (Foley artist)	Fox
2005	Catscratch	"Love Cats", "Zombie Party a Go-Go"	Joe Pizzulo, Tom Maydeck (supervising sound editors), Jeffrey Kettle (supervising Foley editor), Mishelle Fordham (supervising dialogue/ADR editor), Terry Taylor, Robert Watson (music editors), Rick Hinson (sound editor), Sanaa Kelley (Foley artist)	Nickelodeon
2005	The Fairly OddParents	"The Good Ol' Days", "Future Lost"	Robert Poole II (sound designer), Mary Erstad (supervising Foley editor), Robbi Smith (supervising dialogue/ADR editor), Guy Moon (music editor), Craig Ng (Foley artist)	Nickelodeon
2005	SpongeBob SquarePants	"Have You Seen This Snail?"	Timothy J. Borquez (supervising sound editor), Jeff Hutchins (sound designer), Tony Orozco (supervising Foley editor), Mishelle Fordham (supervising dialogue editor), Nick Carr (music editor), Keith Dickens, Eric Freeman, Thomas Syslo, Mark Howlett (sound editors), Monett Holderer (Foley artist)	Nickelodeon
2005	American Dad!	"Homeland Insecurity"	Bob Newlan (supervising sound editor), Stan Jones, Douglas M. Lackey (music editors), Andrew Ellerd (sound effects/foley), Robert Ramirez (sound editor), Daniel Ben-Shimon (dialogue editor), Patrick Hogan (dialogue/ADR editor), Sonya Henry (dialogue/ADR editor), Dale W. Perry (Foley artist)	Fox
2005	Johnny Test	"Deep Sea Johnny", "Johnny & The Amazing Turbo Action Backpack"	Otis Van Osten, Melinda Wunsch Dilger (supervising sound editor), Trevor Sperry (supervising Foley editor), Mark Keatts (supervising dialogue/ADR editor), Jeff Shiffman (sound design/sound effects editor), Mike Garcia, Kelly Ann Foley, Mark Keefer, Chuck Smith (dialogue/ADR editors), Jody Thomas (Foley artist)	Kids' WB
2005	¡Mucha Lucha!	"Niko Sushi's Happy Battle Funtime Dome", "Smarticus"	Gary Falcone, Tom Maydeck (supervising sound editors), Jeffrey Kettle (supervising Foley editor), Mark Keatts (supervising dialogue/ADR editor), Chuy Flores, Tomas Jacobi, Rene Garza Aldape, Nicholas Berry (music editors), Robert Duran (sound editor), Mike Garcia (dialogue editor), Kerry Iverson (ADR editor), Mark Keefer, Charles A. Smith (dialogue/ADR editors), Sanaa Kelley (Foley artist)	Kids' WB
2005	Super Robot Monkey Team Hyperforce Go!	"I, Chiro"	Otis Van Osten, Melinda Wunsch Dilger (supervising sound editors), Jason Oliver (supervising dialogue/ADR editor), Wes Otis, Jeff Shiffman, Ron Salaises, Kenneth Young (sound editors)	Jetix
2006	Drawn Together	"Wooldoor Sockbat's Giggle Wiggle Roundtable"	Tom Hays (supervising sound editor), Mark Jasper (supervising Foley editor), Frank Szick (supervising dialogue editor), Morgan Gerhard (supervising ADR editor), Nick Neutra, Doug Reed (Foley artists), Lydian Tone (music editor)	Comedy Central
2006	American Dad!	"Dungeons and Wagons"	Bob Newlan (supervising sound editor), Dale W. Perry (Foley artist), Stan Jones, Douglas M. Lackey (music editors), Andrew Ellerd, Brian Thomas Nist, Shawn Ian Kerkhoff, Patrick Hogan, Jane Boegel (sound editors)	Fox
2006	My Life as a Teenage Robot	"Teen Idol"	Thomas Syslo, Timothy J. Borquez (supervising sound editors), Diane Greco (Foley artist), Tony Orozco, Eric Freeman, Doug Andham, Daisuke Sawa, Mishelle Fordham (sound editors)	Nickelodeon
2006	Ben 10	"Ben 10,000"	Otis Van Osten, Melinda Wunsch Dilger (supervising sound editors), Trevor Sperry (supervising Foley editor), Matt Brown (supervising dialogue/ADR editor), Jody Thomas (Foley artist), Andy Sturmer (music editor), Ron Salaises, Keith Dickens (sound effects editors)	Cartoon Network
2006	Squirrel Boy	"Screw Up in Aisle Six"	Michael Geisler (supervising sound editor), Matt Brown (supervising dialogue editor), Diane Greco (Foley artist), Curt Hackney, April Tucker (sound editors)	Cartoon Network
2006	Kappa Mikey	"Mikey Impossible"	Will Ralston (supervising sound editor), Rachel Chancey (sound design), Matthew Haasch (sound effect/Foley editor), Igor Nikolic, Jamie Baker, Chad Birmingham (sound effect/Foley editors)	Nicktoons
2006	Super Robot Monkey Team Hyperforce Go!	"Demon of the Deep"	Otis Van Osten, Melinda Wunsch Dilger (supervising sound editors), Trevor Sperry (supervising Foley editor), Jason Oliver (supervising dialogue/ADR editor), Jody Thomas (Foley artist), Sebastian Evans (music editor), Wes Otis, Kenneth Young, Jeff Shiffman, Kate Finan, Ron Salaises (sound effects editors)	Jetix
2006	Yin Yang Yo!	"Return of the Night Master I & II"	Otis Van Osten, Melinda Wunsch Dilger (supervising sound editors), Trevor Sperry (supervising Foley editor), Jason Oliver (supervising dialogue/ADR editor), Jody Thomas (Foley artist), Michael Tavera (music editor), Jeff Shiffman, Kate Finan (sound effects editors)	Jetix
2007	Best Sound Editing – SFX, Foley, Dialogue, ADR & Music for TV Animation			
2007	SpongeBob SquarePants	"Spongehenge"	Paulette Victor-Lifton, Jimmy Lifton (supervising sound editors), Aran Tanchum (supervising Foley editor), Mishelle Fordham (supervising dialogue editor), Kimberly Vanek, Jason Stiff (supervising ADR editors), Jeff Hutchins (sound design), Nick Carr (music editor), Vincent Guisetti, Monique Reymond (Foley artists)	Nickelodeon
2007	The Batman	"A Mirror Darkly"	Thomas Syslo (supervising sound editor), Timothy J. Borquez (supervising Foley editor), Mark Keatts (supervising dialogue editor), Mark Keefer (supervising ADR editor), Keith Dickens, Eric Freeman, Erik Foreman, Tony Orozco, Doug Andham (editors), Diane Greco (Foley artist)	Kids' WB
2007	Catscratch	"Spindango Fundulation", "Duck and Cover"	Joe Pizzulo, Tom Maydeck (supervising sound editors), Jeffrey Kettle (supervising Foley editor), Mishelle Fordham (supervising dialogue/ADR editor), Rick Hinson, William Hinson (sound editors), Jason Stiff (dialogue editor), Terry Taylor, Robert Watson (music editors), Sanaa Kelley (Foley artist)	Nickelodeon
2007	El Tigre: The Adventures of Manny Rivera	"Grave Escape"	Paulette Victor-Lifton, Jimmy Lifton (supervising sound editors), Aran Tanchum (supervising Foley editor), Mishelle Fordham (supervising dialogue editor), Molly Minus, Jason Stiff (supervising ADR editors), Ian Nyeste (sound design), Shawn Patterson (music editor), Vincent Guisetti (Foley artist)	Nickelodeon
2007	Tak and the Power of Juju	"A Shaman's Shaman", "The Gift"	Jake Allston (supervising sound editor/sound designer), Roy Braverman (supervising Foley editor), J. Lampinen (Foley artist)	Nickelodeon
2007	Transformers: Animated	"Transformers and Roll Out!"	Otis Van Osten, Jeff Shiffman (supervising sound editors), Trevor Sperry (supervising Foley editor), Matthew Brown (supervising dialogue/ADR editor), Kate Finan, Kenneth Young, Gerardo Gonzalez (editors), Jody Thomas (Foley artist)	Cartoon Network
2007	Loonatics Unleashed	"It Came from Outer Space"	Timothy J. Borquez, George Nemzer (supervising sound editors), Mark Keatts (supervising dialogue editor), Thomas Syslo (supervising sound editor), Doug Andham (sound editor), Daisuke Sawa (Foley editor), Mark Keefer (dialogue editor), Mike Garcia (ADR editor), Diane Greco (Foley artist)	Kids' WB
2007	Shrek the Halls		Richard L. Anderson (supervising sound editor), James Christopher (supervising Foley editor), Thomas Jones (supervising dialogue/ADR editor), Todd Murakami (sound editor), Richard Whitfield (music editor), Catherine Harper, Christopher Moriana (Foley artists)	ABC
2008	Star Wars: The Clone Wars	"Lair of Grievous"	Matthew Wood (supervising sound editor), David Acord (sound designer), Frank Rinella (supervising Foley editor), Dennie Thorpe, Jana Vance, Ellen Heuer (Foley artists)	Cartoon Network
2008	Avatar: The Last Airbender	"Sozin's Comet Part 4: Avatar Aang"	Ben Wynn (supervising sound editor/sound designer), Mishelle Fordham (supervising dialogue editor), Jason Stiff (supervising ADR editor), Aran Tanchum (supervising Foley editor), Jeremy Zuckerman (music editor), Sergio Silva, Paulette Victor-Lifton, Chris Gresham, Matthew Thomas Hall (Foley editors), Vincent Guisetti (Foley artist)	Nickelodeon
2008	Family Guy	"Road to Germany"	Bob Newlan (supervising sound editor), Andrew Ellerd (sound designer, sound effects editor), Patrick S. Clark (dialogue editor), Jeremy Scott Olsen (sound editor), Stan Jones, Douglas M. Lackey (music editors), Dale W. Perry (Foley artist)	Fox
2008	SpongeBob SquarePants	"Suction Cup Symphony"	Paulette Victor-Lifton, Jimmy Lifton (supervising sound editors), Mishelle Fordham (supervising dialogue editor), Jason Stiff (supervising ADR editor), Kimberly Vanek (supervising Foley editor), Jeff Hutchins, D.J. Lynch (sound designers), Nick Carr, Chino Oyamada Carr (music editors), Chris Gresham, Brian Magrum, Lawrence Reyes, Aran Tanchum (Foley editors), Vincent Guisetti (Foley artist)	Nickelodeon
2008	The Mighty B!	"Bee Patients"	Heather Olsen (supervising sound editor/sound designer), Mishelle Fordham (supervising dialogue/ADR editor), Mary Erstad (supervising Foley editor), Tommy Holmes (music editor), Craig Ng (Foley artist)	Nickelodeon
2008	The Penguins of Madagascar	"Gone in a Flash"	Paulette Victor-Lifton, Jimmy Lifton (supervising sound editors), Michael Petak (supervising dialogue editor), Jason Stiff (supervising ADR editor), Oliver Pearce (supervising Foley editor), Ian Nyeste (sound designer), D.J. Lynch (ADR & sound design), Lawrence Reyes (sound effects editor), Dominick Certo (music editor), Brian Magrum, Aran Tanchum (Foley editors), Vincent Guisetti, Monique Reymond (Foley artists), Matthew Thomas Hall (Foley and sound effects artist)	Nickelodeon
2008	The Batman	"Lost Heroes: Part Two"	Timothy J. Borquez, Thomas Syslo (supervising sound editors), Mark Keatts (supervising dialogue editor, supervising ADR editor), Mike Garcia, Mark Keefer (dialogue editors), Kelly Ann Foley (ADR editor), Eric Freeman, Keith Dickens, Erik Foreman, Tony Orozco (sound effects editors), Diane Greco (Foley artist)	Kids' WB
2008	The Marvelous Misadventures of Flapjack	"Kid Nickles"	Jeff Hutchins (supervising sound editor, supervising Foley editor, sound designer), Tony Ostyn (supervising dialogue editor), Danny Tchibinda (sound effects editor), Darrin Mann (sound editor), Sean Rowe, Edward M. Steidele (Foley artists)	Cartoon Network
2009	The Penguins of Madagascar	"What Goes Around"	Paulette Victor-Lifton, Jimmy Lifton (supervising sound editors), Ian Nyeste (sound designer), Aran Tanchum (supervising Foley editor), Michael Petak (supervising dialogue editor), Jason Stiff (supervising ADR editor), Dominick Certo (music editor), Vincent Guisetti (Foley artist), Oliver Pearce (dialogue editor), Matthew Thomas Hall (Foley editor), D.J. Lynch (dialogue editor, music editor), Lawrence Reyes (sound effects editor)	Nickelodeon
2009	Monsters vs. Aliens: Mutant Pumpkins from Outer Space		John Marquis (supervising sound editor), Jonathan Klein (supervising Foley editor), Susan Dudeck (supervising ADR editor), Adam Milo Smalley (music editor), Alyson Dee Moore, John Roesch (Foley artists), P.K. Hooker (sound effects editor)	NBC
2009	The Fairly OddParents	"Wishology: The Big Beginning"	Heather Olsen (supervising sound editor, sound designer), Roy Braverman (supervising Foley editor), Robbi Smith (supervising dialogue editor), J. Lampinen (Foley artist), Mishelle Fordham (ADR editor)	Nickelodeon
2009	SpongeBob SquarePants	"SpongeBob SquarePants vs. The Big One"	Paulette Victor-Lifton, Jimmy Lifton (supervising sound editors), Jeff Hutchins (sound designer), Kimberly Vanek (supervising Foley editor), Mishelle Fordham (supervising dialogue editor), Jason Stiff (supervising ADR editor), Chino Oyamada Carr, Nick Carr (music editors), Vincent Guisetti, Monique Reymond (Foley artists), D.J. Lynch (sound effects editor, dialogue editor), Sergio Silva, Aran Tanchum (Foley editors)	Nickelodeon
2009	Prep & Landing		Bill R. Dean (supervising sound editor), Dane A. Davis (sound designer), Marla McGuire (supervising Foley/dialogue/ADR editor), Stephen M. Davis (music editor), John Roesch, Alyson Dee Moore (Foley artists), David A. Whittaker (sound editor)	ABC
2009	Star Wars: The Clone Wars	"Landing at Point"	Matthew Wood (supervising sound editor), David Acord (sound designer), Frank Rinella (supervising Foley editor), Ellen Heuer, Sean England (Foley artists), Juan Peralta (sound effects editor)	Cartoon Network

=== 2010s ===
Year	Program	Episode(s)	Nominees	Network
2010	The Penguins of Madagascar	"The Lost Treasure of the Golden Squirrel"	Paulette Victor-Lifton, Jimmy Lifton (supervising sound editors), Ian Nyeste (sound designer), Aran Tanchum (supervising Foley editor), Michael Petak (supervising dialogue editor), Jason Stiff (supervising ADR editor), Vincent Guisetti (Foley artist), Lawrence Reyes (sound effects editor, Foley editor), Matthew Thomas Hall (sound effects editor), D.J. Lynch, Oliver Pearce (dialogue editors)	Nickelodeon
2010	Firebreather		Timothy J. Borquez, Thomas Syslo (supervising sound editors), Eric Freeman, Daisuke Sawa (sound designers), Robert Serda (supervising dialogue editor), Diane Greco (Foley artist), Tony Orozco, Jussi Tegelman (sound effects editors), Robert Crew (Foley editor)	Cartoon Network
2010	The Secret Saturdays		Joe Pizzulo (supervising sound editor), Paul Menichini (sound designer), Jeffrey Kettle (supervising Foley editor), Mark Mercado (supervising dialogue editor), Cynthia Merrill (Foley artist), Jonathan Abelardo (dialogue editor)	Cartoon Network
2010	The Avengers: Earth's Mightiest Heroes	"Masters of Evil"	Mike Draghi (supervising sound editor), Jesse Arruda, Glenn Oyabe (sound designers), Kyle Billingsley (supervising Foley editor), Mike Garcia (supervising dialogue editor), Pamela Kahn, Nancy Parker (Foley artists), Stephen P. Robinson (sound effects editor)	Disney XD
2010	Futurama	"The Late Philip J. Fry"	Travis Powers (supervising sound editor), Paul D. Calder (supervising dialogue editor), Chris Vallance (dialogue editor)	Comedy Central
2010	G.I. Joe: Renegades	"Homecoming Part 2"	Jake Allston (supervising sound editor), Mary Erstad (supervising Foley editor), Robbi Smith (supervising dialogue editor), Paul McGrath (supervising ADR editor), Craig Ng (Foley artist)	The Hub
2010	Monster High: New Ghoul at School		Gary Falcone (supervising sound editor), Rick Hinson (sound designer), Roberto Dominguez Alegria (supervising Foley editor), Mark Mercado (supervising dialogue/ADR editor), Cynthia Merrill (Foley artist)	YouTube
2010	Prep & Landing Stocking Stuffer: Operation: Secret Santa		Odin Benitez (supervising sound editor, sound designer), Todd Toon (supervising Foley editor), Christopher T. Welch (supervising dialogue/ADR editor), Alyson Dee Moore, John Roesch (Foley artists), Donald J. Malouf (sound effects editor, Foley editor)	ABC
2011	The Penguins of Madagascar	"The Return of the Revenge of Dr. Blowhole"	Paulette Victor-Lifton, Jimmy Lifton (supervising sound editors), Ian Nyeste (sound designer), Aran Tanchum (supervising Foley editor), Michael Petak (supervising dialogue editor), Jason Stiff (supervising ADR editor), Vincent Guisetti, Monique Reymond (Foley artists), Matthew Thomas Hall (sound effects editor), Oliver Pearce (dialogue editor), D.J. Lynch (dialogue/music editor), Chris Gresham (Foley editor)	Nickelodeon
2011	Futurama	"Law and Oracle"	Travis Powers (supervising sound editor), Paul D. Calder (supervising dialogue editor), Chris Vallance (dialogue editor)	Comedy Central
2011	Fanboy & Chum Chum	"A Very Brrr-y Icemas"	Joe Pizzulo, Gary Falcone (supervising sound editors), Ian Nyeste, Lawrence Reyes (sound designers), Aran Tanchum (supervising Foley editor), Mishelle Fordham (supervising dialogue editor), D.J. Lynch (supervising ADR editor), Vincent Guisetti, Monique Reymond (Foley artists), Jason Stiff, Molly Minus (dialogue editors), Matthew Thomas Hall (sound effects editor)	Nickelodeon
2011	Kung Fu Panda: Legends of Awesomeness	"Sight for Sore Eyes"	Jason Stiff, Molly Minus (supervising sound editors), Rob McIntyre, Matthew Thomas Hall (sound designers), Aran Tanchum (supervising Foley editor), Anna Adams (supervising dialogue editor), Justin Brinsfield (supervising ADR editor), Vincent Guisetti, Monique Reymond (Foley artists), Chris Gresham (Foley editor), Matt Corey (dialogue/ADR editor), Devon Bowman (dialogue editor)	Nickelodeon
2011	Lego Star Wars: The Padawan Menace		Wayne Pashley (supervising sound editor/sound designer), John Simpson (supervising Foley editor), Derryn Pasquill (sound editor), Jenny T. Ward (dialogue editor), Ben Beverley (dialogue editor), David White (sound effects editor), Damon Mouris (sound effects editor)	Cartoon Network
2011	Kick Buttowski: Suburban Daredevil	"Truth or Darevil"	Jeff Shiffman, Otis Van Osten (supervising sound editors), Jason Oliver (supervising dialogue/ADR editor), Gerardo Gonzalez (sound effects editor), Roger Pallan (Foley editor)	Disney XD
2011	Phineas and Ferb	"Across the 2nd Dimension"	Robert Poole II (supervising sound editor/sound designer), Roy Braverman (supervising Foley editor), Robbi Smith (supervising dialogue editor), J. Lampinen (Foley artist)	Disney Channel
2011	Ice Age: A Mammoth Christmas		Michael Silvers (supervising sound editor), Sue Fox (supervising Foley editor), Jana Vance, Dennie Thorpe (Foley artists), Mac Smith (sound effects editor), Gwendolyn Yates Whittle (ADR editor)	Fox
2012	Adventure Time	"Card Wars"	Thomas Syslo, Timothy J. Borquez (supervising sound editors), Robert Serda (supervising ADR editor), Krandal Crews (supervising dialogue editor), Diane Greco (Foley artist), Tony Orozco, Eric Freeman (sound effects editors)	Cartoon Network
2012	Family Guy	"Yug Ylimaf"	Bob Newlan (supervising sound editor), Dale W. Perry (Foley artist), Andrew Ellerd (sound designer), Patrick S. Clark, Timothy A. Cleveland, Mark Eklund (editors)	Fox
2012	Robot and Monster	"Security Risk", "Ogo's Birthday"	Heather Olsen (sound designer), Roy Braverman (supervising Foley editor), J. Lampinen (Foley artist), Anna Adams (dialogue editor)	Nickelodeon
2012	SpongeBob SquarePants	"Gary's New Toy"	Devon Bowman (supervising sound editor), Aran Tanchum (supervising Foley editor), Justin Brinsfield (supervising ADR editor), Vincent Guisetti (Foley artist), Jeff Hutchins (sound designer), Mishelle Fordham (supervising dialogue editor), D.J. Lynch, Nick Carr (sound effects editors), Danny Tchibinda, Jessey Drake (Foley editors)	Nickelodeon
2012	It's a SpongeBob Christmas!		Paulette Victor-Lifton, Jimmy Lifton (supervising sound editors), Aran Tanchum (supervising Foley editor), Mishelle Fordham (supervising ADR editor, supervising dialogue editor), Monique Reymond, Vincent Guisetti (Foley artists), Edward M. Steidele (Foley artist, Foley editor), Jeff Hutchins (sound designer), D.J. Lynch (dialogue editor), Wes Otis (Foley editor)	CBS
2012	Lego Star Wars: The Empire Strikes Out		Matthew Wood (supervising sound editor), Frank Rinella (supervising Foley editor), Jana Vance, Dennie Thorpe (Foley artists), David Acord (sound designer), Steve Slanec (supervising dialogue editor), Jeremy Bowker (editor)	Cartoon Network
2012	Robot Chicken DC Comics Special		Thomas Syslo, Timothy J. Borquez (supervising sound editors), Krandal Crews (supervising ADR editor), Matt Brown (supervising dialogue editor), Diane Greco (Foley artist), Tony Orozco, Eric Freeman (sound effects editors)	Cartoon Network
2013	The Fairly OddParents	"Dumbbell Curve"	Heather Olsen (supervising sound editor, sound designer), Roy Braverman (supervising Foley editor), Robbi Smith (supervising dialogue editor), J. Lampinen (Foley artist)	Nickelodeon
2013	Phineas and Ferb	"Mission Marvel"	Robert Poole II (supervising sound editor, sound designer), Roy Braverman (supervising Foley editor), Robbi Smith (supervising dialogue editor), J. Lampinen (Foley artist)	Disney Channel
2013	Gravity Falls	"Gideon Rises"	Heather Olsen (supervising sound editor, sound designer), Roy Braverman (supervising Foley editor), Robbi Smith (supervising dialogue editor), J. Lampinen (Foley artist), Brad Breeck (music editor)	Disney Channel
2013	Star Wars: The Clone Wars	"The Lawless"	Matthew Wood (supervising sound editor), David Acord (sound designer), Dennie Thorpe, Jana Vance (Foley artists), Jeremy Bowker, Erik Foreman, Steve Slanec (sound editors), Frank Rinella (Foley editor), Dean Menta, Sean Kiner (music editors)	Cartoon Network
2013	TRON: Uprising	"Terminal"	Michael Ferdie (supervising sound editor), Walter Spencer (supervising Foley editor, Foley artist), Mike Horton (Foley artist), Mark Stephan Kondracki (dialogue editor), Sean McGuire (music editor)	Disney XD
2013	Monster High: Friday Night Frights		Gary Falcone (supervising sound editor), Jeff Davis, Johnny Ludgate (sound designers), Mark Mercado (supervising dialogue editor), Jonathan Abelardo (supervising ADR editor)	Nickelodeon
2013	T.U.F.F. Puppy	"Mud with Power", "Legal Beagle"	Heather Olsen (supervising sound editor, sound designer), Roy Braverman (supervising Foley editor), Robbi Smith (supervising dialogue editor), J. Lampinen (Foley artist)	Nickelodeon
2013	Teenage Mutant Ninja Turtles	"Target April O'Neill"	Jeff Shiffman, Otis Van Osten (supervising sound editors), Gerardo Gonzalez, Matthew Thomas Hall (sound designers), Roger Pallan (supervising Foley editor), Anna Adams (supervising dialogue editor), Alex Ullrich (Foley artist), John Sanacore (Foley editor)	Nickelodeon
2014	Star Wars Rebels	"Gathering Forces"	Matthew Wood (supervising sound editor), David Acord (supervising sound editor, sound designer), Frank Rinella (supervising Foley editor, Foley artist), Kimberly Patrick (Foley artist), Ryan J. Frias (sound effects editor), Tony Diaz (dialogue editor, ADR editor), Sean Kiner (supervising music editor)	Disney XD
2014	Teenage Mutant Ninja Turtles	"In Dreams"	Jeff Shiffman (supervising sound editor), Roger Pallan (supervising Foley editor, Foley artist), Anna Adams (supervising dialogue editor, supervising ADR editor), Alex Ullrich (Foley artist), Gerardo Gonzalez, Matthew Thomas Hall (sound effects editors), Sebastian Evans (supervising music editor)	Nickelodeon
2014	Sofia the First	"The Curse of Princess Ivy"	Timothy J. Borquez, Thomas Syslo (supervising sound editors), Diane Greco (Foley artist), Alex Borquez, Tony Orozco, Daisuke Sawa (sound effects editors), Nick Gotten III (dialogue editor, ADR editor)	Disney Channel
2014	Gravity Falls	"Into the Bunker"	Heather Olsen (supervising sound editor, sound designer), Aran Tanchum (supervising Foley editor), Robbi Smith (supervising dialogue editor, supervising ADR editor), J. Lampinen (Foley artist)	Disney XD
2014	Penn Zero: Part-Time Hero	"North Pole Down"	Eric Freeman (supervising sound editor), Roy Braverman (supervising Foley editor), Mark Stephan Kondracki (supervising dialogue editor, supervising ADR editor), J. Lampinen (Foley artist)	Disney XD
2014	The 7D	"Buckets", "Frankengloom"	Kate Finan, Otis Van Osten (supervising sound editors), John Sanacore (supervising Foley editor), Jason Oliver (supervising dialogue editor, supervising ADR editor), Jeffrey Wilhoit (Foley artist), Roger Pallan, Gerardo Gonzalez (sound effects editors)	Disney XD
2014	Ultimate Spider-Man	"The Spider-Verse: Part 1"	Mike Draghi (supervising sound editor), Greg Rubin, Marcos Abrom (sound designers), Maciek Malish (supervising Foley editor), John Brengman (supervising dialogue editor, supervising ADR editor), Maciej Krakówka, Tomasz Dukszta (Foley artists), Jesse Arruda (sound effects editor)	Disney XD
2015	Teenage Mutant Ninja Turtles	"Annihilation: Earth! Part 1", "Annihilation: Earth! Part 2"	Jeff Shiffman (supervising sound editor, sound effects editor), Roger Pallan (supervising Foley editor), Elliot Herman (supervising dialogue editor), Alex Ullrich (Foley artist), Jessey Drake (sound effects editor), Anna Adams (dialogue/ADR editor)	Nickelodeon
2015	Avengers Assemble	"The Ultron Outbreak"	Mike Draghi, Stephen P. Robinson (supervising sound editors), Jesse Arruda, Marcos Abrom (sound designers), Roberto Dominguez Alegria (supervising Foley editor), Mike Garcia (supervising dialogue editor), Nancy Parker (Foley artist), Michael Emter (sound effects editor), Mark Mattson (music editor)	Disney XD
2015	Gravity Falls	"Dipper and Mabel vs. the Future"	Heather Olsen (supervising sound editor, sound designer), Aran Tanchum (supervising Foley editor), Robbi Smith (supervising dialogue/ADR editor), J. Lampinen (Foley artist)	Disney XD
2015	Penn Zero: Part-Time Hero	"Massive Morphy Merge Mechs", "Ultrahyperball"	Eric Freeman (supervising sound editor), Roy Braverman (supervising Foley editor), Mark Stephan Kondracki (supervising dialogue editor), Craig Ng (Foley artist), Kate Finan, Jessey Drake (sound effects editors)	Disney XD
2015	Star Wars Rebels	"Wings of the Master"	Matthew Wood (supervising sound editor), David Acord (supervising sound editor, sound designer), Margie O'Malley (Foley artist), Bonnie Wild (sound effects editor, dialogue/ADR editor), Frank Rinella (dialogue/ADR editor)	Disney XD
2015	Ultimate Spider-Man	"Contest to the Champions: Part 4"	Mike Draghi (supervising sound editor), John Brengman (supervising dialogue editor), Maciek Malish (supervising Foley editor), Jesse Arruda, Marcos Abrom (sound designers), Maciej Krakówka (Foley artist), Michael Emter (sound effects editor), Dan Negovan (music editor)	Disney XD
2015	Half-Shell Heroes: Blast to the Past		Jeff Shiffman (supervising sound editor), Roger Pallan (supervising Foley editor), Elliot Herman (supervising dialogue editor), Alex Ullrich (Foley artist), Jessey Drake, Brad Meyer, Eric Paulsen (sound effects editors), Anna Adams (dialogue/ADR editor)	Nickelodeon
2015	Lego Scooby-Doo! Knight Time Terror		Devon Bowman (supervising sound editor), Mark Keatts (supervising dialogue editor), Aran Tanchum (supervising Foley editor), Rob McIntyre (sound designer), Vincent Guisetti (Foley artist), Kelly Ann Foley (dialogue/ADR editor), Patrick J. Foley, Mike Garcia (dialogue/ADR editors), Christine H. Luethje (music editor), Robert Duran (sound editor)	Cartoon Network
2016	Albert		Jeff Shiffman (supervising sound editor, sound effects editor), Michael Petak, Anna Adams (dialogue editors), Tess Fournier (Foley editor, sound effects editor), Craig Ng (Foley artist), Brad Breeck (music editor), Jessey Drake (sound effects editor)	Nickelodeon
2016	Avengers Assemble		Mike Draghi (supervising sound editor), Marcos Abrom, Michael Emter, Jesse Arruda (sound designers), John Brengman (dialogue editor), Roberto Dominguez Alegria (Foley editor), Monique Reymond (Foley artist)	Disney XD
2016	Gravity Falls	"Weirdmageddon 3: Take Back The Falls"	Heather Olsen (supervising sound editor, sound designer), Robbi Smith (supervising dialogue editor), Aran Tanchum (Foley editor), J. Lampinen (Foley artist)	Disney XD
2016	Star Wars Rebels	"Twilight of the Apprentice: Part 2"	Matthew Wood (supervising sound editor), David Acord (supervising sound editor, sound designer), Tony Diaz, Jacob Ortiz (dialogue editors), Frank Rinella (Foley editor), Kimberly Patrick (Foley artist), Bonnie Wild (sound effects editor)	Disney XD
2016	BoJack Horseman	"Fish Out of Water"	Hunter Curra (supervising sound editor), Konrad Piñon (ADR editor), Andrew Twite, Joy Elett, Kailand C. Reilly (sound designers)	Netflix
2016	Voltron: Legendary Defender	"The Black Paladin"	Rob McIntyre, Devon Bowman (supervising sound editors), Brian F. Mars (supervising dialogue editor), Alfredo Douglas, Aran Tanchum (Foley editors), Vincent Guisetti (Foley artist), Brad Breeck, Brian Parkhurst (music editors), Marc Schmidt, Evan Dockter, Lawrence Reyes (sound designers), D.J. Lynch, Andrew Ing, Jessey Drake (sound effects editors)	Netflix
2016	Teenage Mutant Ninja Turtles	"The Ever-Burning Fire"	Jeff Shiffman (supervising sound editor), Elliot Herman, Anna Adams (dialogue editors), Roger Pallan (Foley editor), Sebastian Evans (music editor), Jessey Drake (sound effects editor)	Nickelodeon
2017	Overwatch: Honor and Glory		Paul Menichini (supervising sound editor), Caroline Hernandez (audio lead), Alexander Ephraim, Harry Cohen, David Farmer, Geoffrey Garnett, Kris Giampa, Paul Lackey (sound designers), Keith Bilderbeck, Chris De La Pena (sound effects editors), Isaac Hammons, Christopher Cody Flick (dialogue editors), Gary Coppola (Foley editor), Gregg Barbanell (Foley artist), Neal Acree (music editor), John Kurlander (scoring editor)	Blizzard Entertainment
2017	Castlevania	"Witchbottle"	Gary Falcone (supervising sound editor), Paul Menichini (sound designer), Roberto Dominguez Alegria (Foley editor), Tom Maydeck, Mark Mercado (dialogue editors), Cynthia Merrill (Foley artist)	Netflix
2017	The Adventures of Puss in Boots	"A Savage Place"	Heather Olsen (supervising sound editor, sound designer), Shawn Bohonos (supervising dialogue editor), Robbi Smith (dialogue editor), David Bonilla, Chris Coyne (Foley editors), J. Lampinen (Foley artist)	Netflix
2017	Justice League Action	"Follow that Space Cab!"	Robert Hargreaves (sound designer), Mark Keatts (supervising dialogue editor), Mike Garcia (dialogue editor), John Hegedes (Foley editor)	Cartoon Network
2017	Not Normal		Eric Marks, Matt MacDonald (supervising sound editors)	Em Squared
2017	Rick and Morty	"Pickle Rick"	Hunter Curra (supervising sound editor), Kailand C. Reilly, Andrew Twite, Joy Elett, Jeff Halbert (sound effects editors), Konrad Piñon (dialogue editor)	Adult Swim
2017	Star Wars Rebels	"Trials of the Darksaber"	David Acord, Matthew Wood (supervising sound editors), Bonnie Wild, Kimberly Patrick (sound effects editors), Frank Rinella (Foley editor), Ronni Brown (Foley artist)	Disney XD
2017	Tangled: The Series	"The Quest for Varian"	Otis Van Osten (supervising sound editor), Gerardo Gonzalez, Carlos Sanches (sound effects editors), Jason Oliver (dialogue editor), Goeun Lee Everett (Foley editor), Kevin Kliesch (music editor)	Disney Channel
2018	Overwatch: Reunion		Paul Menichini (supervising sound editor), Caroline Hernandez (audio lead), Alexander Ephraim, Harry Cohen, J.P. Walton (sound designers), Christopher Battaglia, John Thomas (sound effects editors), Isaac Hammons, Christopher Cody Flick (dialogue editors), Gary Coppola (Foley editor), Gregg Barbanell (Foley artist), Derek Duke (supervising music editor), Adam Burgess, Sam Cardon (music editors), John Kurlander (scoring editor)	Blizzard Entertainment
2018	Spy Kids: Mission Critical	"The Vinyl Countdown"	Paulette Victor-Lifton (supervising sound editor), Jamison Rabbe (sound designer), Gary Coppola (dialogue editor), Doug Madick (Foley artist), Greg Mauer (Foley editor)	Netflix
2018	Bilby		Rick Hromadka (sound designer), Alyson Dee Moore, Christopher Moriana (Foley artists)	DreamWorks Animation
2018	Bird Karma		Rick Hromadka (sound designer), Alyson Dee Moore, Christopher Moriana (Foley artists)	DreamWorks Animation
2018	Star Wars Rebels	"A World Between Worlds"	David Acord, Matthew Wood (supervising sound editors), Bonnie Wild (sound effects editor), Ronni Brown (Foley artist), Kimberly Patrick (Foley artist), Margie O'Malley (Foley artist), Frank Rinella (Foley editor)	Disney XD
2018	Crow: The Legend		Scot Blackwell Stafford (supervising sound editor), Jamey Scott (sound designer, sound effects editor), Rex Darnell (music editor)	Baobab Studios
2018	Lost Property Office		Chris Goodes (supervising sound editor), Mario Vaccaro (Foley artist), Michael Grisold, Lee Yee (Foley editors)	8th in Line
2018	Rise of the Teenage Mutant Ninja Turtles	"Mystic Mayhem"	Jeff Shiffman (supervising sound editor), Jessey Drake (sound effects editor), John Deligiannis (dialogue editor), Carol Ma (Foley editor)	Nickelodeon
2018	Steven Universe	"Reunited"	Tony Orozco, Timothy J. Borquez (supervising sound editors), Diane Greco (Foley artist)	Cartoon Network
2019	3Below: Tales of Arcadia		Otis Van Osten (supervising sound editor), James Miller (sound designer), Jason Oliver, Carlos Sanches (dialogue editors), Aran Tanchum, Vincent Guisetti (Foley artists), Tommy Sarioglou (Foley editor)	Netflix
2019	DC Showcase: Sgt. Rock		Robert Hargreaves (sound designer), Mark Keatts (supervising ADR editor), Mike Garcia (dialogue editor), Kelly Ann Foley (ADR editor)	Warner Bros. Animation
2019	Love, Death + Robots	"The Secret War"	Brad North (supervising sound editor, dialogue editor), Craig Henighan (sound designer), Jordan Wilby, Troy Prehmus (sound effects editors), Jeff Charbonneau (music editor), Alicia Stevenson, Dawn Lunsford (Foley artists)	Netflix
2019	Overwatch: Sigma – Origin Story		Paul Menichini (supervising sound editor), Brian Johnson, Chris De La Pena (sound designers), Christopher Cody Flick, Isaac Hammons (dialogue editors), Christopher Battaglia, John Thomas, Larry Peacock, Gary Summers (sound effects editors), Derek Duke (supervising music editor), Mark Petrie, Jake Lefkowitz (music editors)	Blizzard Entertainment
2019	Rise of the Teenage Mutant Ninja Turtles	"The Evil League of Mutants"	Jeff Shiffman (supervising sound editor), Jessey Drake, Carol Ma (sound effects editors), John Deligiannis (dialogue editor)	Nickelodeon
2019	Star Wars Resistance	"The Voxx Vortex 5000"	David Acord, Matthew Wood (supervising sound editors), David W. Collins (sound effects editor), Frank Rinella (Foley supervisor, Foley editor), Andrea Gard (Foley artist)	Disney Channel
2019	The Adventures of Rocky and Bullwinkle	"Amazamoose and Squirrel Wonder: Chapter Five"	Rob McIntyre, Devon Bowman (supervising sound editor), Lawrence Reyes (sound designer), Kerry Iverson (dialogue editor), Peter Munters (sound effects editor), Monique Reymond (Foley artist), Roberto Dominguez Alegria, Ezra Walker (Foley editors)	Amazon

=== 2020s ===
Year	Program	Episode(s)	Nominees	Network
2020	Baga Yaga		Scot Stafford (supervising sound editor), Andrew Vernon, Jamey Scott (sound designer), Brendan Wolf (sound effects editor), Rex Darnell (music editor)	Amazon
2020	Archer	"Cold Fusion"	JC Richardson, Pierre Cerrato (sound designers), JG Thirlwell (music editor)	FX
2020	The Boss Baby: Back in Business	"Escape From Krinkles"	Jeff Shiffman (supervising sound editor), Greg Rubin, Ian Howard (sound effects editors), Iverson-Brody, Xinyue Yu (dialogue editors), Carol Ma (Foley editor)	Netflix
2020	Canvas		Andre Fenley, Jermaine Stegall (supervising sound editors), Justin Pearson (sound designer), Andrew Vernon (sound effects editor), Frank Aglieri-Rinella (Foley artist)	Netflix
2020	Wizards	"Spellbound"	James Miller, Otis Van Osten (supervising sound editors), Tommy Sarioglou, Aran Tanchum (Foley editor), Carlos Sanches, Jason Oliver (dialogue editors), Vincent Guisetti (Foley artist)	Netflix
2020	Star Wars: The Clone Wars	"The Phantom Apprentice"	Matthew Wood, David Acord (supervising sound editors), Kimberly Patrick (sound effects editor), Frank Rinella (Foley editor), Margie O’Malley (Foley artist), Tony Diaz (dialogue editor), Peter Lam (music editor)	Disney+
2020	Star Trek: Short Treks	"Ephraim and Dot"	Matthew E. Taylor (supervising sound editor), Tim Farrell, Harry Cohen (sound designer), Moira Marquis, Stan Jones (music director), Sean Heissinger (ADR editor)	CBS All Access
2021	Outstanding Achievement in Sound Editing – Animation Series or Short			
2021	Love, Death + Robots	"Snow in the Desert"	Brad North (supervising sound editor); Craig Henighan (sound designer); Jeff Gross, Dawn Lunsford (Foley editors); Alicia Stevens (Foley artist); Jeff Charbonneau (music editor)	Netflix
2021	Star Trek: Lower Decks	"Strange Energies"	James Lucero (supervising sound editor); James Singleton, Mak Kellerman (sound effects editors); Michael LaFerla (dialogue editor); Michael Britt (Foley artist)	Paramount+
2021	Jurassic World Camp Cretaceous	"Eye of the Storm"	Rob McIntyre (supervising sound editor); Evan Dockter (sound designer); Marc Schmidt, D.J. Lynch (sound effects editors); Anna Adams (dialogue editor); Aran Tanchum (Foley editor); Ezra Walker, Vincent Guisetti (Foley artists)	Netflix
2021	Star Wars: Visions	"The Duel"	David W. Collins, Matthew Wood (supervising sound editors); David W. Collins (sound designer); Luke Dunn Gielmuda (sound editor); Jana Vance (Foley artist)	Disney+
2021	Star Wars: The Bad Batch	"Reunion"	Matthew Wood (supervising sound editor); David W. Collins (sound designer); David W. Collins (sound editor); Frank Rinella (Foley editor); Kimberly Patrick (Foley artist)	Disney+
2021	Star Wars: A Galaxy of Sounds	"Excitement"	David W. Collins (supervising sound editor); Ben Burtt, David Acord, Ren Klyce, Tim Nielson, Chris Scarabosio, Tom Bellfort, Sam Shaw, Gary Rydstrom (sound designers); Matthew Wood (sound editor)	Disney+
2022	Outstanding Achievement in Sound Editing – Broadcast Animation			
2022	Love, Death + Robots	"In Vaulted Halls Entombed"	Brad North (supervising sound editor); Antony Zeller (Foley editor); Zane Bruce, Lindsay Pepper (Foley artists)	Netflix
2022	Jurassic World Camp Cretaceous	"The Last Stand"	Rob McIntyre, D.J. Lynch (supervising sound editors); Evan Dockter (sound designer); Adam Cioffi (sound effects editor); Anna Adams (dialogue editor); Aran Tanchum (Foley editor); Vincent Guisetti (Foley artist)	Netflix
2022	Tales of the Jedi	"The Sith Lord"	David W. Collins, Matthew Wood (supervising sound editors); Kevin Bolen, Michael Brinkman (sound effects editors); Frank Rinella (Foley supervisor); Margie O'Malley, Andrea Gard, Sean England (Foley artists)	Disney+
2022	Transformers: EarthSpark	"Age of Revolution"	Brad Meyer (supervising sound editor); Natalia Saavedra Brychcy (sound effects editor); Christine Gamache (dialogue editor); Carol Ma (Foley editor)	Paramount+
