= Golden Reel Award for Outstanding Achievement in Sound Editing – Sound Effects, Foley, Dialogue and ADR for Feature Documentary =

Motion Picture Sound editing award

- Country: United States
- Presented by: Motion Picture Sound Editors
- Currently held by: Eilam Hoffman, Nina Hartstone, Jacob Bloomfield-Misrach, Adam Méndez, Samir Foco, Michael Harte, Tom Sayers, Adam Armitage, Greg Francis, Rob Davidson, Oli Ferris – Deaf President Now! (2022)

The Golden Reel Award for Outstanding Achievement in Sound Editing – Sound Effects, Foley, Dialogue and ADR for Feature Documentary is an annual award given by the Motion Picture Sound Editors. It honors sound editors whose work has warranted merit in the field of cinema; in this case, their work in the field of documentary films. It was first awarded in 2010.

== Winners and nominees ==
=== 2010s ===
Best Sound Editing - Sound Effects, Foley, Dialogue, ADR and Music in a Feature Documentary

Year	Film	Winners/Nominees
2010	Rush: Beyond the Lighted Stage	David Rose (supervising sound editor/sound effects editor/music editor), Andrew Wright (sound effects editor/music editor), Stephen Barden (dialogue editor)
2010	Babies	Samy Bardet (supervising sound editor, sound designer, supervising Foley editor), Thierry Lebon (supervising sound editor), Eric Chevallier (supervising dialogue editor), Jérôme Faurel (music editor), Philippe Penot (Foley artist)
2010	Catfish	Coll Anderson (supervising sound editor), Matt Snedecor (sound designer)
2010	Exit Through the Gift Shop	Jack Gillies (supervising sound editor), Jim Carey (sound designer)
2010	Inside Job	Tom Efinger (supervising sound editor), Abigail Savage (sound designer)
2010	Restrepo	Coll Anderson (supervising sound editor), Matt Snedecor (sound designer)
2010	Waiting for "Superman"	Skip Lievsay (supervising sound editor), Byron Wilson (dialogue editor), Joel Dougherty, Phil Barrie (sound effects editors), Erica Weis (music editor)
2011	George Harrison: Living in the Material World	Philip Stockton (supervising sound editor), Allan Zaleski (sound designer), Jennifer L. Dunnington (music editor)
2011	Being Elmo: A Puppeteer's Journey	Ken Hahn (supervising sound editor), Jay Fisher (sound effects/Foley editor), Kevin Bluhm (music editor)
2011	Cave of Forgotten Dreams	Eric Spitzer (sound designer)
2011	Lemmy	Greg Olliver (supervising sound editor)
2011	Pearl Jam Twenty	Eric R. Fischer, Kevin Klauber, Chris Perkel (sound designers)
2012	Last Call at the Oasis	Peter Brown (supervising sound editor), Paul Aulicino (sound effects editor), Glynna Grimala (dialogue editor), Kim Roberts (music editor)
2012	Bully	Christopher Barnett (supervising sound editor/supervising dialogue editor), Al Nelson, Gary Rydstrom (sound designers), Michael Furjanic (music editor), Pete Horner, Bob Edwards, Pascal Garneau (sound effects editors)
2012	Climate Refugees	Sam Londe (supervising sound editor, sound designer), Steven Avila (sound designer), Steven Utt (music editor), Peter D. Lago, Michael Turner, Stephen Spencer, Alexander Pugh (sound effects editors), Bryon Speller, Brian S.M. Wroth (dialogue editors)
2012	Jiro Dreams of Sushi	Darren 'Sunny' Warkentin (supervising sound editor/sound designer), Tim Hoogenakker (supervising dialogue editor), Anthony Vanchure (Foley artist/sound effects editor), Robert Weiss (sound effects editor), Chris Johnston (Foley editor)
2012	Marley	Glenn Freemantle (supervising sound editor), Danny Freemantle, Ben Barker, Nina Hartstone (sound effects editors)
2012	Searching for Sugar Man	Per Nyström (supervising sound editor), Malik Bendjelloul (sound effects editor)
2013	Dirty Wars	Christopher Barnett (supervising sound editor, sound designer), Brandon Proctor (sound designer)
2013	1	Lon Bender, Beau Borders (supervising sound editors), Bill R. Dean, Ryan Meadows (sound designers), Jeremy B. Davis (supervising Foley editor), Nicholas Interlandi (sound effects editor)
2013	20 Feet from Stardom	Al Nelson (supervising sound editor, sound designer), Kim Foscato (supervising sound editor), Pete Horner (music editor)
2013	CinemAbility: The Art of Inclusion	Andrew DeCristofaro (supervising sound editor), Michael Payne (sound designer), John C. Stuver (dialogue editor), Sally Boldt (music editor)
2013	Good Ol' Freda	Henry Auerbach (supervising sound editor), Justin Rickard (sound designer)
2013	Muscle Shoals	Christopher Koch (supervising sound editor), Randy Matuszewski, Eric Di Stefano (sound designers), Elizabeth Fausak (supervising dialogue editor), Richard Lowe (music editor)
2013	Rising from Ashes	David Barber (supervising sound editor/supervising dialogue editor), Ben Zarai (supervising sound editor), Michael Kreple, Sean Gray (sound designers), Gonzalo Espinoza (supervising Foley editor/supervising ADR editor), David Kitchens (Foley artist)
2013	Sound City	Lihi Orbach (sound effects editor)
2014	Warsaw Uprising	Kacper Habisiak, Bartosz Putkiewicz (supervising sound editors), Marcin Kasinski, Dariusz Stanek (sound designers), Henryk Zastrózny (supervising Foley editor), Filip Krzemien (supervising dialogue editor/supervising ADR editor), Jacek Wisniewski (Foley artist), Jacek Pajak (Foley artist), Aleksandra Pajak, Anna Kufirska, Filip Krzyzykowski, Michal Kosterkiewicz (sound effects editors), Tomasz Maciatek (dialogue editor/ADR editor), Agnieszka Putkiewicz (supervising music editor), Dariusz Podhajski, Anna Malarowska (music editors), Stefan Gawlowski, Maciej Wiejaczka, Jaroslaw Bajdowski, Mariusz Bielecki, Mariusz Andrysik (ADR editors)
2014	America: Imagine the World Without Her	David Barber (supervising sound editor, supervising dialogue editor/supervising ADR editor), David Kitchens (supervising sound editor/Foley artist), Ben Zarai, Ken Skoglund, Randy Torres (sound designers), Gonzalo Espinoza (supervising Foley editor/supervising ADR editor), Shaun R. Fabos (Foley artist), Sean Gray, Michael Kreple (sound effects editors)
2014	Citizenfour	Frank Kruse (supervising sound editor/sound designer), Alexander Buck (supervising dialogue editor/supervising ADR editor), Carsten Richter (Foley artist), Markus Stemler, Helene Seidl (sound effects editors), Hans Schumann (music editor)
2014	Deepsea Challenge 3D	Chris Goodes (supervising sound editor), Steve Burgess (sound designer), George Alamaras (supervising Foley editor), Andy Wright (supervising dialogue editor/supervising ADR editor), Mario Vaccaro (Foley artist), James Ashton, Glenn Newnham (sound effects editors), Jason Fernandez (music editor), Peter Hoyland (music editor)
2014	EDC 2013: Under the Electric Sky	Ben Wilkins (supervising sound editor/sound designer), Craig Mann (supervising sound editor/dialogue editor/ADR editor), Dawn Lunsford (Foley artist), Alicia Stevenson (Foley artist), Lauren Hadaway (sound effects editor), Andy Brohard (music editor)
2014	Glen Campbell: I'll Be Me	Milos Zivkovic (supervising sound editor), Elisa Bonora (dialogue editor, ADR editor), Brooke Wentz (supervising music editor), Alice Wood (music editor)
2014	Jodorowsky's Dune	Jesse Flower-Ambroch (supervising sound editor)
2015	Kurt Cobain: Montage of Heck	Cameron Frankley (supervising sound editor), Dan Kenyon (sound effects editor), Jon Michaels (music editor)
2015	A Faster Horse	Mark P. Stoeckinger (supervising sound editor), Luke Gibleon (supervising sound editor), Will Digby, Filippa Nilsson (sound effects editor), Cliff Latimer (dialogue/ADR editor), Richard Ziegler (music editor)
2015	Amy	Andy Shelley (supervising sound editor), Stephen Griffiths (supervising sound editor), Barnaby Smyth (supervising Foley editor), Robin Whittaker (music editor), John Kurlander (music editor)
2015	Best of Enemies	Pete Horner (supervising sound editor), Al Nelson (sound designer), Andre Zweers (sound effects editor)
2015	The Wrecking Crew!	Bob Bronow (supervising sound editor/music editor)
2015	What Happened, Miss Simone?	Tony Volante (supervising sound editor/supervising dialogue editor), Daniel Timmons (sound effects editor/music editor), Joshua L. Pearson (sound effects editor/music editor)
2015	Racing Extinction	Tim Nielsen (supervising sound editor/sound designer), Christopher Barnett (supervising sound editor), Dennie Thorpe, Jana Vance, Frank Rinella (Foley artists), Jonathan Borland (sound effects editor), Liz Gallacher (supervising music editor), Arthur Pingrey (music editor)
2015	Winter on Fire: Ukraine's Fight for Freedom	Oleg Kulchytskyi (supervising sound editor), Maksym Skorupskyi (sound designer), Vadim Stolyar (dialogue/ADR editor)
2016	The Music of Strangers	Pete Horner (supervising sound editor), Al Nelson (sound designer), Andre Zweers (sound effects editor)
2016	13th	Tim Boggs (supervising sound editor), Julie Pearce (music editor), Lise Richardson (music editor), Jeffrey Perkins (sound designer), Alex Lee (sound effects editor)
2016	Amanda Knox	Chris Stangroom, Tom Paul (supervising sound editors), Stephen C. Davies (dialogue editor), Diego Jimenez, Max Holland, Jesse Peterson, Oscar Convers (sound effects editors), Joanna Fang, Leslie Bloome (Foley artists), Ryan Collison, Nick Seaman (Foley editors)
2016	Before the Flood	Allan Zaleski (supervising sound editor), Dave Paterson (sound designer), Lawrence Herman (dialogue editor), Sylvia Menno (dialogue editor), Grant Elder (sound effects editor), Ren Klyce (music editor)
2016	Passage to Mars	Trip Brock (supervising sound editor), Steven Avila (supervising sound editor), Ian Shedd (supervising dialogue editor), Ben Whitver (dialogue editor), Shasha Dong (dialogue editor), Raymond Park, Peter D. Lago, Alexander Pugh, Jean-Christophe Jeauffre (sound effects editors), Matt Salib, Terry Boyd Jr. (Foley artists)
2016	The Beatles: Eight Days a Week – The Touring Years	Cameron Frankley, Jon Michaels (supervising sound editors), Harrison Meyle (dialogue editor), Melissa Muik (music editor), Dan Kenyon, Will Digby (sound effects editors)
2016	The Eagle Huntress	Lewis Goldstein, Tom Ryan (supervising sound editors), Pierre Takal (sound designer), Wen Hsuan Tseng (Foley editor), Shaun Brennan (Foley artist), Alex Soto (sound effects editor)
2016	The Ivory Game	Michael Plöderl, Thomas Kathriner (supervising sound editors), Klaus Gartner (dialogue editor), Bernhard Zorzi (sound designer), Bernd Dormayer (sound effects editor)
2017	Jane	Warren Shaw, Joshua Paul Johnson (supervising sound editors), Peter Staubli, Odin Benitez (sound designers), Will Digby (dialogue editor), Tara Blume (Foley artist), Suzana Peric (music editor)
2017	Bill Nye: Science Guy	Peter Albrechtsen (supervising sound editor, sound designer), Morten Groth Brandt (sound effects editor), Jacques Pedersen (dialogue editor), Pietu Korhonen (Foley editor), Heikki Kossi (Foley artist)
2017	Eric Clapton: Life in 12 Bars	Andy Shelley (supervising sound editor), Stephen Griffiths (supervising sound editor), Justin Dolby (dialogue editor), Keith Partridge (Foley editor), Barnaby Smyth (Foley artist)
2017	Icarus	E.J. Holowicki (supervising sound editor), Christopher Barnett (supervising sound editor), Adam Peters (supervising music editor), Mikael Sandgren (music editor)
2017	Hell on Earth: The Fall of Syria and the Rise of ISIS	Mary Ellen Porto (supervising sound editor), Michael Suarez (dialogue editor), Rachel Chancey (Foley editor)
2017	In Pursuit of Silence	Steve Bissinger (supervising sound editor/sound designer), Shaun Farley (dialogue editor), Zach Martin (sound effects editor)
2017	An Inconvenient Sequel: Truth to Power	Kent Sparling (sound designer), Zach Martin (sound effects editor), Gwendolyn Yates Whittle (dialogue editor), Andrea Gard (Foley editor/Foley artist)
2017	Score: A Film Music Documentary	Kari Barber (supervising sound editor/sound effects editor/Foley editor), Peter Bawiec (supervising sound editor/dialogue editor/music editor)
2018	Free Solo	Deborah Wallach (supervising sound editor), Filipe Messeder (sound effects editor), Nuno Bento (Foley artist), Roland Vajs (Foley editor)
2018	They Shall Not Grow Old	Martin Kwok, Brent Burge, Melanie Graham, Justin Webster, Emile de la Rey (supervising sound editors), Nigel Stone (supervising ADR editor), Hayden Collow, Dave Whitehead (sound effects editors), Matt Stutter, Helen Luttrell, Chris Todd, Matthew Lambourn (dialogue editors), James Carroll (Foley artist), Craig Tomlinson, Tom Scott-Toft (Foley editors)
2018	Generation Wealth	Peter Albrechtsen (supervising sound editor/sound designer), Jacques Pedersen (dialogue editor), Lars Halvorsen (sound effects editor)
2018	McQueen	Alex Outhwaite, Richard Kondal (supervising sound editors), Jack Gillies (sound designer), Stelios Koupetoris (dialogue editor), Paula Boram (Foley artist), Ricky Butt (Foley artist), Jamie Roden (Foley editor)
2018	Quincy	Danika Benton Wikke (supervising sound editor), Taylor Westerfield (sound effects editor)
2018	Shirkers	Lawrence Everson (supervising sound editor/sound designer), Cindy Takehara Ferruccio (dialogue editor)
2018	They'll Love Me When I'm Dead	Peter Mullen (supervising sound editor), Graham Barclay (dialogue editor)
2018	Three Identical Strangers	Nas Parkash (dialogue editor), Kim Tae Hak (sound effects editor), Chad Orororo (Foley editor)
2018	Won't You Be My Neighbor?	Pete Horner (supervising sound editor), Al Nelson (sound designer), Teresa Eckton (sound effects editor)
2019	Echo in the Canyon	Robert Stambler (sound designer), Sal Ojeda (dialogue editor)
2019	Apollo 11	Eric Milano (supervising sound editor/sound designer/Foley artist)
2019	Linda Ronstadt: The Sound of My Voice	Milos Zivkovic (supervising sound editor), John Boylan, Julian Raymond, Bennett Salvay (supervising music editors)
2019	Making Waves: The Art of Cinematic Sound	Kimberly Patrick (supervising sound editor), Qianbaihui Yang (supervising sound editor), Sung Rok Choi (dialogue editor)
2019	Rolling Thunder Revue: A Bob Dylan Story by Martin Scorsese	Philip Stockton (supervising sound editor)
2019	Sea of Shadows	Bernhard Zorzi (sound designer), Michael Plöderl (dialogue editor), Bernd Dormayer (Foley editor)
2019	The Cave	Peter Albrechtsen (supervising sound editor), Lars Ginzel (supervising dialogue editor), Rana Eid, Mikkel Nielsen, Thomas Pape (sound effects editors), Theodora Flygt (dialogue editor), Graeme Stewart (supervising music editor), Heikki Kossi, Lars Halvorsen, Anne Tolkkinen (Foley editors)

=== 2020s ===
Year	Film	Winners/Nominees
2020	The Reason I Jump	Laurence Love Greed, Alexej Mungersdorff, Jack Wensley (sound effects editors); Jamie McPhee (dialogue editor); Srdjan Kurpjel (Foley editor)
2020	The Bee Gees: How Can You Mend a Broken Heart	Jonathan Greber (supervising sound editor), Pascal Garneau (sound effects editor)
2020	Crip Camp	Jacob Bloomfield-Misrach (supervising sound editor); William Sammons, James LeBrecht (sound designers); Greg Francis (dialogue editor); Bijan Sharifi (Foley editor)
2020	John Lewis: Good Trouble	Richard Gould (sound effects editor), Christopher Barnett (sound designer)
2020	My Octopus Teacher	Barry Donnelly (supervising sound editor), Charl Mostert (Foley artist)
2020	Rebuilding Paradise	David Hughes, Richard Gould (sound effects editors); Christopher Barnett (sound designer)
2020	The Social Dilemma	Richard Gould (supervising sound editor), James Spencer (dialogue editor), Andrea Gard (Foley artist)
2020	Zappa	Lon Bender (supervising sound editor); Alex Nomick, P. Daniel Newman, Chris Kahwaty (sound effects editors); Ryan Owens, George Anderson, Nick Pavey (dialogue editors)
2021	The Rescue	Deborah Wallach (supervising sound editor), Roland Vajs (sound effects editor), Ben Smithers (music editor), Nuno Bentro (Foley artist)
2021	Billie Eilish: The World's a Little Blurry	Richard Yawn (supervising sound editor); Steven Avila (sound effects editor); Shawn Kennelly (Foley editor); Rob Getty (dialogue editor); Michael Brake (music editor); Melissa Kennelly, Vince Nicastro (Foley artists)
2021	Flee	Edward Björner (supervising sound editor); Fredrik Jonsäter (sound designer); Jens Johansson (dialogue editor); Rune Van Deurs, Bengt Öberg (Foley artists)
2021	Summer of Soul	Joshua L. Pearson (supervising sound editor); Jimmy Douglass (supervising music editor)
2021	Val	John Bolen (supervising sound editor, dialogue/sound effects/Foley editor)
2021	The Velvet Underground	Leslie Shatz (supervising sound editor), Jahn Sood (music editor)
2022	Good Night Oppy	Mark Mangini (supervising sound editor); Tim Walston, Dave Whitehead, Mark Mangini (sound designers); Dave Bach (supervising dialogue editor)
2022	Louis Armstrong's Black and Blues	Leslie Shatz (supervising sound editor and sound designer); Jon Flores (supervising dialogue editor)
2022	Moonage Daydream	Nina Hartstone (supervising sound editor); Samir Foco, James Shirley (sound designers); Louise Burton (sound effects editor)
2022	The Territory	Rune Klausen, Peter Albrechtsen (supervising sound editors/sound designers); Mikkel Nielsen, Tim Nielsen (sound effects editor); Sebastian Vaskio, Guilherme Tortolo Magrin (dialogue editors); Pietu Korhonen (Foley editor); Heikki Kossi (Foley artist)
2023	32 Sounds	Mark Mangini (supervising sound editor); Eliza Paley (supervising ADR editor); Robert Kellough (sound editor); Mari Matsuo (ADR editor); Blake Collins (foley editor); Joanna Fang (foley artist)
2023	American Symphony	Tristan Baylis, Tom Paul (supervising sound editor); Leslie Bloome (Foley artist); Matt Snedecor, Mark Filip (sound effects editor)
2023	Still: A Michael J. Fox Movie	Skip Lievsay (supervising sound editor); Rich Bologna (sound effects editor); Michael Feuser (dialogue editor); Matt Haasch (foley supervisor); Heather Gross (foley editor); Jay Peck (foley artist)
2023	Taylor Swift: The Eras Tour	Phil DeTolve (sound editor)); David Cook (music supervisor)
2023	Mourning in Lod	Yossi Appelbaum, Lior Weitzman (supervising sound editors); Yossi Appelbaum (sound designer)
2024	The Blue Angels	Robert Stambler (supervising sound editor); Ryan "Sully" Sullivan (sound effects editor); Emma Present (dialogue editor)
2024	Dahomey	Nicolas Becker (supervising sound editor and sound designer); Sylvain Malbrant (sound editor); Maxime Saleix (dialogue editor); Gilles Marsalet (foley artist)
2024	Elton John: Never Too Late	Rob Getty, Richard Yawn (supervising sound editors); Mike Pipgras (sound editor)
2024	Music by John Williams	Christopher Barnett, Roy Waldspurger (supervising sound editors); Tim Farrell (sound effects editor), Dmitri Makarov (dialogue editor), Ramiro Belgardt (music editor)
2024	Super/Man: The Christopher Reeve Story	Greg Gettens (supervising sound editor); Will Chapman (sound designer); Claire Ellis (supervising dialogue editor); Olly Freemantle (foley editor); Zoe Freed (foley artist)
2024	Will & Harper	Zach Seivers (supervising sound editor); George Pereyra, Adam Parrish King (sound effect editors); Jared K. Neal (dialogue editor)
2025	Deaf President Now!	Eilam Hoffman, Nina Hartstone, Jacob Bloomfield-Misrach (supervising sound editors); Adam Méndez (foley supervisor); Samir Foco, Eilam Hoffman, Nina Hartstone, Michael Harte, Tom Sayers (sound designers); Adam Armitage (sound editor); Greg Francis (dialogue editor); Rob Davidson (foley editor); Oli Ferris (foley artist)
2025	Becoming Led Zeppelin	Nick Bergh (supervising sound editor); Bernard MacMahon, Dan Gitlin (sound designers); Nick Bergh, Dan Gitlin (sound effects editors); Dan Gitlin, Nick Bergh (dialogue editors)
2025	I Was Born This Way	Leslie Gaston-Bird (supervising sound editor); Lauren Cooper, Lora Cornes (sound editors)
2025	It's Never Over, Jeff Buckley	Lewis Goldstein (supervising sound editor); Alexis Soto (supervising effects editor)
2025	Viktor	Peter Albrechtsen (supervising sound editor); Heikki Kossi, Peter Albrechtsen, Nicolas Becker (sound designers); Mikkel Nielsen (sound editor); Kristoffer Salting (dialogue editor)
