= Rock 'n' Roll Star! =

Box set by David Bowie
- Released: 14 June 2024
- Recorded: February 1971 – October 1972
- Genre: Rock
- Length: 3:48:00
- Label: Parlophone
- Producer: Various

David Bowie chronology
Moonage Daydream (2022)	Rock 'n' Roll Star! (2024)	Ready, Set, Go! (Live, Riverside Studios '03) (2025)

David Bowie box set chronology
Divine Symmetry: An Alternative Journey Through Hunky Dory (2022)	Rock 'n' Roll Star! (2024)	I Can't Give Everything Away (2002–2016) (2025)

Rock 'n' Roll Star! is a box set by English singer David Bowie, released posthumously on 14 June 2024.

== Background ==
The box set chronicles the time period from David Bowie recording The Rise and Fall of Ziggy Stardust and the Spiders from Mars to a BBC performance from late 1972 that features songs from The Rise and Fall of Ziggy Stardust and the Spiders from Mars to Hunky Dory. Many of the album's tracks had already been bootlegged or officially released on official and unofficial Bowie compilations.

== Content ==
The Blu-ray disc includes the 2003 5.1 mix. It also includes reproductions of David Bowie's Ziggy Stardust era notebooks.

== Reception ==
Professional ratings
Aggregate scores
Source	Rating
Metacritic	84/100
Review scores
Source	Rating
AllMusic	4/5 stars
Classic Rock	4/5 stars
Mojo	4/5 stars
Record Collector	4/5 stars

The box set has been viewed favorably by various music magazines and websites such as Rolling Stone. Record Collector stated that it "underscores just what a remarkable thing Bowie achieved: this is the mortal man behind the extraterrestrial dressing, and it’s no less compelling for that." Goldmine Magazine critic Dave Thompson said in his review summary of the box set that is an "immaculately packaged five CDs-plus-Blu ray box that reaches back to early 1971 in search of the demos and doodles that would become Ziggy Stardust." The staff of Rock Cellar Magazine gave it a positive review.

== Charts ==
Chart (2024)	Peak position
Austrian Albums (Ö3 Austria)	47
Belgian Albums (Ultratop Flanders)	33
Belgian Albums (Ultratop Wallonia)	50
Dutch Albums (Album Top 100)	44
French Albums (SNEP)	56
German Albums (Offizielle Top 100)	51
Spanish Albums (Promusicae)	81
Swiss Albums (Schweizer Hitparade)	34
US Top Current Album Sales (Billboard)	22
US Top Album Sales (Billboard)	34
US Indie Store Album Sales (Billboard)	15
UK Albums (Official Charts)	39
