= Moonage Daydream (film) =

2022 documentary film about David Bowie

- Theatrical release poster
- Directed by: Brett Morgen
- Written by: Brett Morgen
- Produced by: Brett Morgen
- Starring: David Bowie
- Edited by: Brett Morgen
- Production companies: BMG; Public Road Productions; Live Nation Productions; HBO Documentary Films
- Distributed by: Neon (United States); Universal Pictures (international)
- Release dates: 23 May 2022 (Cannes); 16 September 2022 (United States)
- Running time: 134 minutes
- Countries: Germany; United States
- Language: English
- Box office: $13.9 million

Moonage Daydream is a 2022 documentary film about English artist David Bowie. Written, directed, produced and edited by Brett Morgen, the film uses previously unreleased footage from Bowie's personal archives, including live concert footage. It is the first film to be officially authorized by Bowie's estate, and takes its title from the 1972 Bowie song of the same name.

Moonage Daydream had its world premiere at the 2022 Cannes Film Festival, where it received positive reviews. It was released theatrically and in IMAX in the United States on 16 September 2022. It was shortlisted for Best Documentary Feature at the 95th Academy Awards, and won Best Music Film at the 66th Annual Grammy Awards.

== Synopsis ==
The documentary uses a montage-style editing format to convey a biography of Bowie, using film clips and interviews from throughout his career. The film starts with a 2002 quote of Bowie stating:

"At the turn of the 20th century, Friedrich Nietzsche proclaimed that God is dead and that man had killed him."
"This created an arrogance with man that he himself was God. But as God, all he could seem to produce was disaster."
"That led to a terrifying confusion: for if we could not take the place of God, how could we fill the space we had created within ourselves?"

The film is divided into nearly two dozen "chapters" in the DVD release with the first hour covering Bowie starting in London up to his departure to West Berlin. The second part of the film discussed and presents Bowie's extensive interests in the arts while in West Berlin outside of the music industry, such as his interest in oil painting and acrylic painting, as well as his forays into the literary arts. Many examples of Bowie's portrait work in oils are presented showing the use of a modern representational style of portraiture combined with an experimental color palette for brightly lit representations in nearly kaleidoscopic color preferences for facial expressions. In his third phase covered in the last part of the film, Bowie emerges from a two-year hiatus where he remakes himself in the image of a suave musical artist often dressed in tailored Savile Row double breasted men's business suits.

The first hour of the film begins with a long film clip of Bowie performing a live version of a largely narrated version of "All the Young Dudes" before singing the choruses later made famous by Mott the Hoople's recording of the song. Bowie is pictured in many clips from his glam rock years wearing heavily costumed outfits often experimenting with the signature transgender dressing associated with his early years. Bowie emerges from these pre-Berlin years as a significant rock-and-roll star on the London scene making an impact throughout much of Britain and the United States.

After moving to West Berlin, Bowie speaks in clips and interviews about the extensive impact which the aesthetics of German culture in West Berlin had upon his artistic sensibilities. Bowie is apparently deeply moved by the visual arts as he experiences them while in West Berlin, and this influences his own painting style in his own renderings of oil portraits and related efforts in his other oil paintings. The documentary's film style of montage also interlaces many film clips from over two dozen different films ranging from the silent era including the film Metropolis up to and including clips from the Stanley Kubrick-directed films Clockwork Orange and 2001: A Space Odyssey.

Bowie's third phase is covered by showing him appearing in his tailored Savile Row double breasted business suits and appearing in duets with multiple established artists such as Tina Turner and others. He is depicted as having entered the height of his career and formed a new life style with his new wife Iman Abdulmajid. Bowie dies at the age of 69.

== Production ==
In 2021, Variety reported that Brett Morgen had been developing a film based on David Bowie, "for which an official title has not been disclosed, for the last four years." It is the first film to be officially authorized by Bowie's estate. Working in cooperation with the estate, Morgen was granted access to an archive of five million different items, including paintings, drawings, recordings, photographs, films, and journals. Tony Visconti, who spent years as Bowie's producer, serves as the film's music producer.

== Marketing ==
An official teaser trailer for the film was uploaded to YouTube on 23 May 2022. A full trailer was released on 27 July.

== Release ==
Moonage Daydream had its world premiere at the 2022 Cannes Film Festival on 23 May 2022. It was released in IMAX and theatres in the United States on 16 September 2022. It was also expected to be released for streaming on HBO Max in spring 2023. The documentary was released on DVD and Blu-ray on 15 November 2022. It also was released on Ultra HD Blu-ray by the Criterion Collection in September 2023.

== Soundtrack ==
To accompany the film, a soundtrack album containing music of Bowie's used therein was announced on 25 August 2022. An initial digital release was set for 16 September 2022, with a two-disc CD version to follow on 18 November 2022 and a three-disc vinyl record release was released on 31 March 2023. The music on the album consists of rare or previously unreleased live tracks, as well as newly created remixes, interspersed with monologues from Bowie himself.

== Reception ==
=== Critical response ===
On Rotten Tomatoes, the film has an approval rating of 92% based on 156 reviews, with an average rating of 8.2/10. The website's critics' consensus reads: "An audiovisual treat for Bowie fans, Moonage Daydream takes an appropriately distinctive approach to one of modern music's most mercurial artists." On Metacritic, which uses a weighted average, the film has a score of 83 out of 100 based on 34 critic reviews, indicating "universal acclaim".

Owen Gleiberman of Variety wrote that "We've seen trippy documentaries before, but Morgen seems to have created this movie to be rock 'n' roll. [...] Watching Moonage Daydream, there are essential facts you won't hear, and many touchstones that get skipped over (in the entire movie, you'll never even see an album cover). But you get closer than you expect to the chilly sexy enigma of who David Bowie really was." Corey Seymour of Vogue commended the film's editing and soundtrack, and called the film "astounding, bombastic, groundbreaking, electrifying, and among the best films about any artist or musician I've ever seen. [...] Morgen has [assembled] a mesmerizing collage of sound and vision that will entrance and enrich any Bowie fan and, presumably, make new fans of anyone lucky enough to have this be their first real encounter with his world."

Peter Bradshaw, in his review of the film for The Guardian, gave it a score of five out of five stars. He called the film "a glorious celebratory montage", and wrote favourably of how the film "shows that his fans, especially the ecstatic young people at the Hammersmith Odeon and Earl's Court shows, were not different from Bowie: they became Bowie. Overwhelmed, transfigured, their faces looked like his face." Robert Daniels, writing for RogerEbert.com, praised the film's editing, and called it "a bombastic, overstimulating, poignant, life-affirming, and risk-taking summation of the artist's ethos and maturation as a person. In short, Moonage Daydream is the film Bowie would've proudly made." Fionnuala Halligan of Screen Daily called the film "a pristine sensory voyage, with astonishing sound", and lauded its presentation as "skilled and satisfyingly unconventional".

Entertainment Weekly's Joshua Rothkopf gave the film a grade of "A−", complimenting the remixed music by Tony Visconti and noting that, "Occasionally, Morgen's flow can feel belabored and imprecise, [...] But pruning would hamper the unencumbered risk-taking on display," an approach which Rothkopft writes "instantly vaults the effort to the top of the Bowie docs." Siddhant Adlakha of IndieWire gave the film a "B+", characterizing it thus: "More sensory experience than straightforward recounting, [Moonage Daydream] is about feeling your way through a chaotic world with Ziggy Stardust as your anchor." He concluded that, "As musical documentaries go, it's more ambitious than anything you're likely to witness for quite some time." Paul Sinclair of SuperDeluxeEdition was more critical in his review, praising the film's integration of archival footage, animation, interview audio, and music while criticizing the pacing and length, describing the result as "oddly unmoving" and stating that "the film is at least half an hour too long, a feeling accentuated by the reuse of clips you've already seen on a number of occasions which gives a rather circular, haven't-we-been-here-before vibe to proceedings." Sinclair also criticized a perceived lack of sufficient coverage for certain periods of Bowie's career, singling out his tenure on EMI America Records and his membership in Tin Machine.

=== Accolades ===
Award	Date of ceremony	Category	Recipient(s)	Result	Ref.
Cannes Film Festival	28 May 2022	Golden Eye	Brett Morgen	Nominated	
Cannes Film Festival	28 May 2022	Queer Palm	Brett Morgen	Nominated	
Critics' Choice Documentary Awards	13 November 2022	Best Documentary Feature	Moonage Daydream	Nominated	
Critics' Choice Documentary Awards	13 November 2022	Best Archival Documentary	Moonage Daydream	Nominated	
Critics' Choice Documentary Awards	13 November 2022	Best Music Documentary	Moonage Daydream	Nominated	
Critics' Choice Documentary Awards	13 November 2022	Best Director	Brett Morgen	Nominated	
Critics' Choice Documentary Awards	13 November 2022	Best Editing	Brett Morgen	Won	
Chicago Film Critics Association	14 December 2022	Best Documentary Film	Moonage Dream	Nominated	
St. Louis Gateway Film Critics Association	18 December 2022	Best Documentary Film	Moonage Dream	Runner-up	
St. Louis Gateway Film Critics Association	18 December 2022	Best Soundtrack	Moonage Dream	Nominated	
Dallas–Fort Worth Film Critics Association	19 December 2022	Best Documentary Film	Moonage Dream	4th place	
Florida Film Critics Circle	22 December 2022	Best Documentary Film	Moonage Dream	Nominated	
Toronto Film Critics Association	8 January 2023	Best Documentary Film	Moonage Dream	Runner-up	
Austin Film Critics Association	10 January 2023	Best Documentary	Moonage Dream	Nominated	
Cinema Eye Honors	12 January 2023	Outstanding Editing	Brett Morgen	Nominated	
Cinema Eye Honors	12 January 2023	Outstanding Sound Design	Samir Foco, John Warhurst and Nina Hartstone	Won	
Cinema Eye Honors	12 January 2023	Outstanding Visual Design	Stefan Nadelman	Won	
Online Film Critics Society	23 January 2023	Best Documentary	Moonage Daydream	Nominated	
London Film Critics' Circle	5 February 2023	Documentary of the Year	Moonage Daydream	Nominated	
Satellite Awards	11 February 2023	Best Motion Picture – Documentary	Moonage Daydream	Nominated	
Vancouver Film Critics Circle	13 February 2023	Best Documentary	Moonage Daydream	Nominated	
British Academy Film Awards	19 February 2023	Best Documentary	Brett Morgan	Nominated	
Hollywood Critics Association Awards	24 February 2023	Best Documentary Film	Moonage Daydream	Nominated	
Golden Reel Awards	26 February 2023	Outstanding Achievement in Sound Editing – Feature Documentary	Nina Hartstone, Samir Foco, James Shirley, Louise Burton	Nominated	
Golden Reel Awards	26 February 2023	Outstanding Achievement in Music Editing – Documentary	Brett Morgan, John Warhurst	Won	
Cinema Audio Society Awards	4 March 2023	Outstanding Achievement in Sound Mixing for a Motion Picture – Documentary	Paul Massey, David Giammarco, Jens Rosenlund Petersen	Won	
Golden Trailer Awards	29 June 2023	Best Documentary – Bio Pic of an Individual	"Mystery" (ZEALOT)	Nominated	
Golden Trailer Awards	29 June 2023	Best Comedy / Drama TrailerByte for a Feature Film	"Peculiar Window" (GrandSon)	Nominated	
Primetime Creative Arts Emmy Awards	9-10 September 2023	Outstanding Directing for a Documentary/Nonfiction Program	Brett Morgen	Nominated	
Primetime Creative Arts Emmy Awards	9-10 September 2023	Outstanding Picture Editing for a Nonfiction Program	Brett Morgen	Nominated	
Primetime Creative Arts Emmy Awards	9-10 September 2023	Outstanding Sound Editing for a Nonfiction or Reality Program (Single or Multi-Camera)	John Warhurst, Nina Hartstone, Jens Rosenlund Petersen, Samir Foco, James Shirley, Elliott Koretz, Amy Felton, Louise Burton, Brett Morgen	Won	
Primetime Creative Arts Emmy Awards	9-10 September 2023	Outstanding Sound Mixing for a Nonfiction Program (Single or Multi-Camera)	Paul Massey and David Giammarco	Won	
Primetime Creative Arts Emmy Awards	9-10 September 2023	Outstanding Writing for a Nonfiction Program	Brett Morgen	Nominated	
Grammy Awards	4 February 2024	Best Music Film	David Bowie and Brett Morgen	Won	
