= Ready, Set, Go! (Live, Riverside Studios '03) =

Live album by David Bowie
- Released: 12 April 2025
- Recorded: 8 September 2003
- Venue: Riverside Studios, London
- Length: 67:16
- Label: Rhino
- Producer: Bowie

David Bowie chronology
Rock 'n' Roll Star! (2024)	Ready, Set, Go! (Live, Riverside Studios '03) (2025)	I Can't Give Everything Away (2002–2016) (2025)

Ready, Set, Go! (Live, Riverside Studios '03) is a 2025 live album by the English musician David Bowie, released by Rhino Entertainment exclusively for Record Store Day on 12 April 2025.

== Background and release ==
On 8 September 2003, Bowie and his backing band performed his album Reality (2003) in its entirety at Riverside Studios in Hammersmith, London, England, with the performance beamed to cinemas and theatres across Europe and, due to time delay, the following day across Asia, Australia, North and South America. 22 years later, the performance was released as an album for Record Store Day 2025. The performance itself was deemed rare before its release as an album.

== Track listing ==
No.	Title	Length
1.	"New Killer Star"	5:08
2.	"Pablo Picasso"	4:41
3.	"Never Get Old"	4:23
4.	"The Loneliest Guy"	4:30
5.	"Looking for Water"	3:38
6.	"She'll Drive the Big Car"	5:49
7.	"Days"	4:15
8.	"Fall Dog Bombs the Moon"	4:26
9.	"Try Some, Buy Some"	4:49
10.	"Reality"	4:42
11.	"Bring Me the Disco King"	8:42
12.	"Hallo Spaceboy"	5:38
13.	"Cactus"	2:57
14.	"Afraid"	3:38
Total length:		67:16

== Personnel ==
According to the liner notes:

- David Bowie – vocals, acoustic guitar
- Earl Slick – guitar
- Sterling Campbell – drums, percussion
- Gerry Leonard – guitar, backing vocals
- Mike Garson – piano, keyboards
- Gail Ann Dorsey – bass, backing vocals
- Catherine Russell – backing keyboards, backing vocals, guitar

== Charts ==
Chart (2024)	Peak position
Dutch Albums (Album Top 100)	67
Scottish Albums (OCC)	8
UK Albums (OCC)	44
US Top Album Sales (Billboard)	21
US Indie Store Album Sales (Billboard)	11
