= Half-Shell Heroes: Blast to the Past =

- Based on: Characters created by: Kevin Eastman; Peter Laird
- Written by: Brandon Auman
- Directed by: Glen Murakami
- Starring: Seth Green; Sean Astin; Greg Cipes; Rob Paulsen; Fred Tatasciore; J.B. Smoove; Kate Mulgrew; Eric Bauza
- Music by: Sebastian Evans II
- Country of origin: United States
- Original language: English

Production
- Running time: 44 minutes
- Production company: Nickelodeon Animation Studios

Original release
- Network: Nickelodeon
- Release: November 22, 2015

Half-Shell Heroes: Blast to the Past is a 2015 animated television movie that is a spin-off of the 2012 Teenage Mutant Ninja Turtles series. Based on the kid-friendly Half-Shell Heroes action figure line that was launched by Playmates Toys, it was directed by Glen Murakami and written by Brandon Auman.

In the movie, the Turtles are transported back to the Cretaceous period by an ancient meteorite and must get back to their own time, while fending off would-be predators and a faction of the Triceraton Army. It premiered on Nickelodeon on November 22, 2015 and was watched by by 1.41 million viewers.

== Synopsis ==
In the movie, the Ninja Turtles are accidentally transported back to the Cretaceous period by an ancient meteorite and must work together with Bebop and Rocksteady (along with some newly befriended dinosaur allies) to get back to their own time, while simultaneously fending off would-be predators and a faction of the Triceraton Army led by General Zera, coming to prehistoric Earth.

== Cast ==
- Seth Green as Leonardo
- Sean Astin as Raphael
- Greg Cipes as Michelangelo
- Rob Paulsen as Donatello and Triceraton Lieutenant
- Fred Tatasciore as Rocksteady
- J.B. Smoove as Bebop
- Kate Mulgrew as General Zera
- Eric Bauza as Tiger Claw, Triceraton Soldier # 2, Triceraton # 3, and Guard #1

== Announcement and release ==
In July 2015, it was announced that Nickelodeon would air one-hour special and spin-off of the 2012 Teenage Mutant Ninja Turtles series titled, Half-Shell Heroes: Blast to the Past. Unlike the series which is produced in 3D computer-animation, the special is 2D-animated and was produced to coincide with Playmates Toys' dinosaur Turtles toyline. The special premiered on November 22, 2015.

Random House also released a book based on the special while Playmates released new dinosaur toys in the fall to coincide with the program. The special was seen by 1.41 million viewers. It was released on DVD, through Nickelodeon and Paramount Home Media Distribution, on March 15, 2016.
