= Coya Elliott =

American sound editor

- Occupation: Sound editor

Coya Elliott is an American sound editor. She was nominated for an Academy Award in the category Best Sound for the film Soul.

== Selected filmography ==
- Soul (2020; co-nominated with Ren Klyce and David Parker)
