= John Warhurst (sound editor) =

British music and sound editor

- Education: University of Huddersfield
- Occupations: Music and Sound Supervisor

John Warhurst is a British music and sound editor, supervisor and producer. He specialises in musical blockbusters and music-driven biopics and won the Academy Award for Best Sound Editing for the film Bohemian Rhapsody (2018).

== Biography ==
He was born in Brighouse, West Yorkshire. Warhurst graduated from the University of Huddersfield with a BMus (Hons) degree in Orchestral Composition and Arrangement and a Master’s degree in Electro-Acoustic Composition. In 2022 he was awarded an honorary doctorate for services to film and music. Warhurst's professional career started in 1998 when he became a music editing assistant in London. Warhurst has worked on numerous films including The Woman in Black, 127 Hours, Hannibal Rising, Charlie and the Chocolate Factory, Sweeney Todd: The Demon Barber of Fleet Street, The Lord of the Rings: The Return of the King and Harry Potter and the Chamber of Secrets.

In 2012 he was part of the sound team who won the BAFTA Award for Best Sound at the 66th British Academy Film Awards for Les Misérables. He won the BAFTA Award for Best Sound at the 72nd British Academy Film Awards and the Academy Award for Best Sound Editing for the film Bohemian Rhapsody at the 91st Academy Awards.

== Selected filmography ==
- Les Misérables (2012)
- One Direction: This Is Us (2013)
- Bohemian Rhapsody (2018; co-won the Academy Award for Best Sound Editing with Nina Hartstone)
- I Wanna Dance with Somebody (2022)
- Moonage Daydream (2022)
- Bob Marley: One Love (2024)
- Maria (2024)
- Michael (2026)
