= Nina Hartstone =

British sound editor

- Occupation: Sound editor

Nina Hartstone is a British sound editor. She won an Academy Award in the category Best Sound Editing for the film Bohemian Rhapsody.

== Selected filmography ==
- Bohemian Rhapsody (2018; co-won with John Warhurst)
