= List of David Bowie band members =

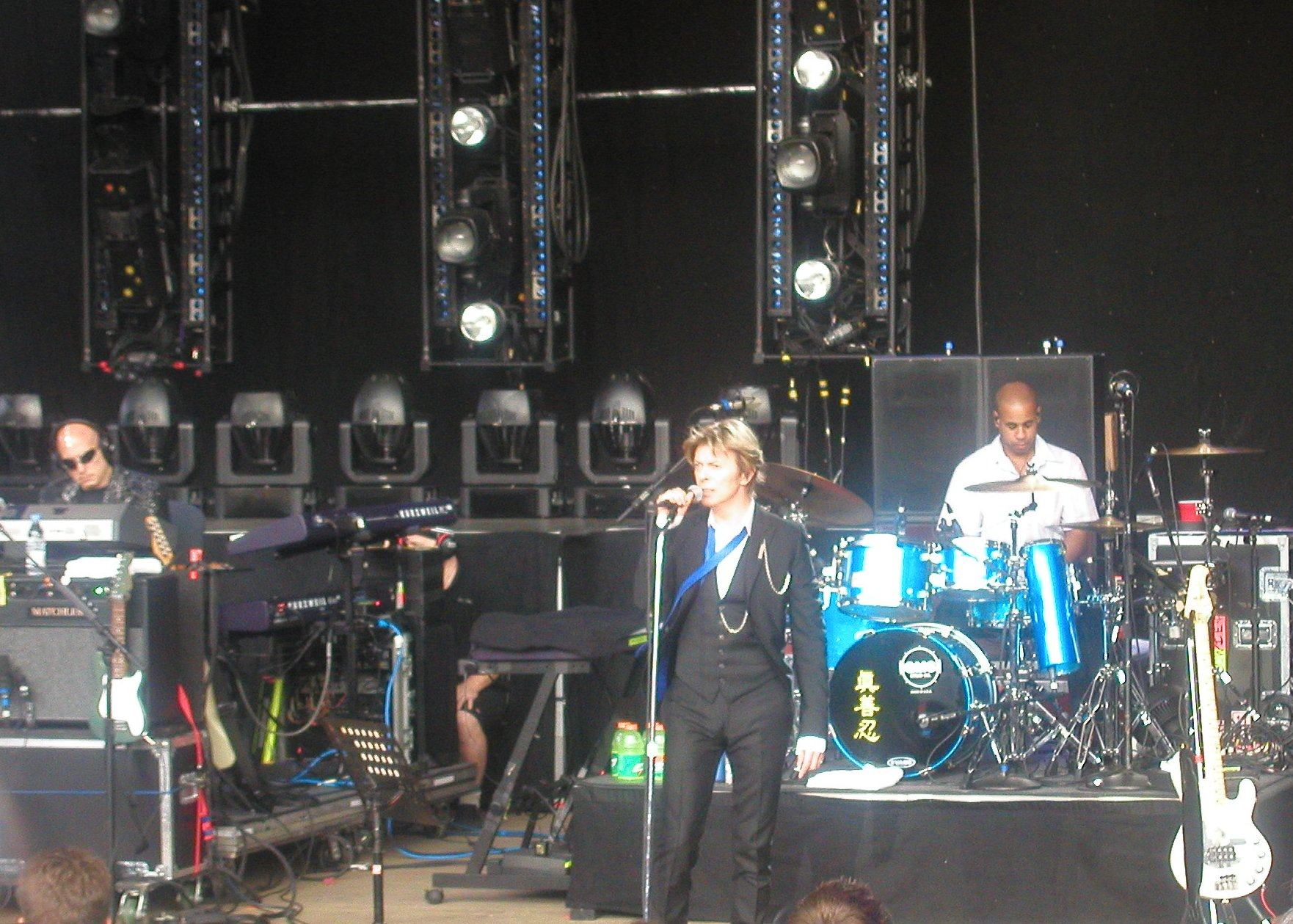

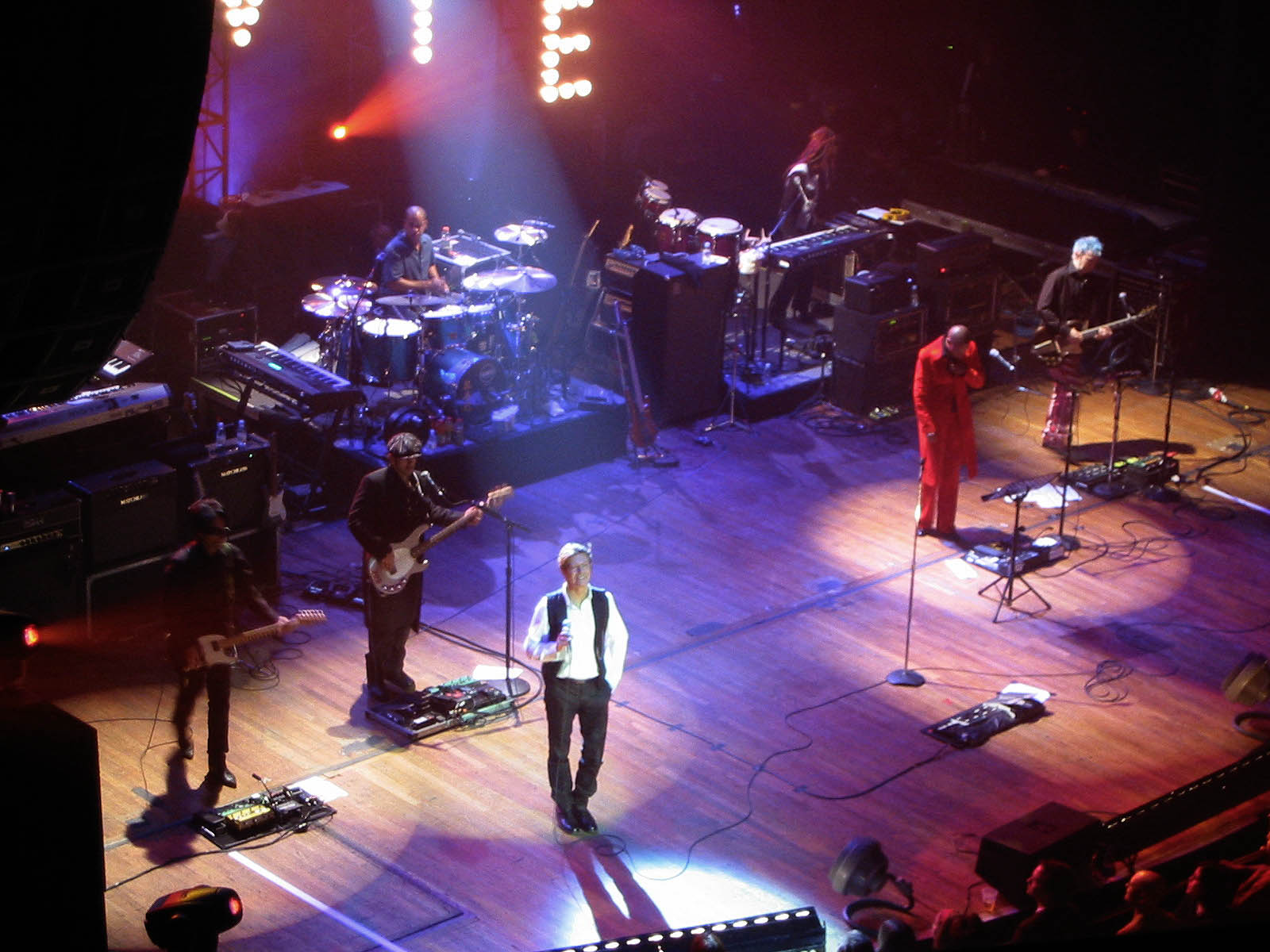
(left to right) Mike Garson (off left), Earl Slick, Mark Plati, Sterling Campbell (on drums), David Bowie, Catherine Russell (on keyboards), Gail Ann Dorsey and Gerry Leonard.

David Bowie performing with his band in 2002

David Bowie (1947–2016) was an English singer-songwriter and musician who started his career as a member of a band called the Konrads, under the name David or Davie Jones, in 1962. Since starting his solo career in 1964, his solo band has gone under many names, including, the Hype, Arnold Corns, the Spiders from Mars and Tin Machine. At the time of his retirement from solo live performances in 2004, his band included himself on vocals, guitars, stylophone and harmonica, Earl Slick on guitar, Gerry Leonard on guitar, keyboards and vocals, Gail Ann Dorsey on bass guitar and vocals, Sterling Campbell on drums, Mike Garson on piano and keyboards and Catherine Russell on keyboards, percussion, guitar and vocals.

== History ==
=== 1960s and 70s ===
Bowie formed his first band, the Konrads, in 1962 at the age of 15 under his birth name David Jones. The Konrads playing guitar-based rock and roll at local youth gatherings and weddings, and had a varying line-up of between four and eight members. Bowie's childhood friend, George Underwood was among them, as was drummer Dave Crook and guitarist Neville Wills. Later members of the Konrads included drummer Dave Hadfield, bassist Rocky Shahan and vocalists Roger Ferris and Christine & Stella Patton. Bowie left the Konrads after disagreements over musical styles while recording.

Following the Konrads he was a member of a trio called the Hooker Brothers, or Dave's Reds and Blues with Underwood on guitar and harmonica, Bowie (still under the name Davie Jones) on vocals and saxophone and drummer Viv Andrews. This band existed from July to November 1963. He started his solo career with the single "Liza Jane" which was credited to Davie Jones with the King Bees, a band which included Jones and Underwood and also lead guitarist Roger Bluck, bassist Dave Howard and drummer Robert Allen.

Jones' next band was the Manish Boys which included Johnny Flux on guitar, Paul Rodriguez on tenor saxophone and trumpet, Woolf Byrne on baritone saxophone, Bob Solly on keyboards, John Watson on bass guitar and Mick White on drums. Jones left this band in February 1966. They released the single "I Pity the Fool" which featured Jimmy Page on lead guitar.

Jones joined a band called the Lower Third in early 1965, the band included Denis "Tea-Cup" Taylor on lead guitar, Graham Rivens on bass guitar and Les Mighall on drums. Mighall later left the band and was replaced by Phil Lancaster. The band fell apart later that year. Jones changed his stage name to David Bowie to disambiguate himself from Davy Jones on The Monkees. Under his new moniker, he started a band called David Bowie and the Buzz, in 1966, the core members of the Buzz were bass guitarist Derek "Dek" Fearnley, keyboard player Derek "Chow" Boyes, and drummer John "Ego" Eager, with earlier guitarists being John Hutchinson and Billy Bray. The band later broke up in November of the same year. The Lower Third contributed to Bowie self-titled debut album in 1967, alongside session musician Big Jim Sullivan.

In early 1967 Bowie joined The Riot Squad, which consisted of Bowie (vocal, guitar, mouth-harp), Rod "Rook" Davies (lead guitar), Brian "Croak" Prebble (bass, vocals), Bob Evans (tenor saxophone, flute, vocals), George "Butch" Davis (keyboards) and Derek "Del" Roll (drums). The band broke up later that year after recording several songs including a cover of the Velvet Underground's "I'm Waiting for the Man".

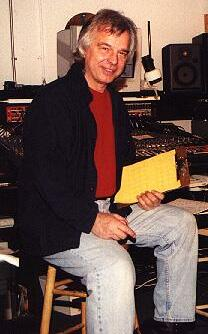
Producer Tony Visconti both toured and recorded with Bowie at various times since 1968.

In May 1968, Bowie performed on John Peel's Top Gear, with a backing band called the Tony Visconti Orchestra, which included Herbie Flowers (bass), Barry Morgan (drums), John McLaughlin (guitar), Alan Hawkshaw (keyboards) and Visconti and Steve Peregrin Took (backing vocals). This performance was released on the album Bowie at the Beeb in 2000.

Following his stint with The Riot Squad, Bowie formed folk influenced trio Turquoise, with himself, Hermione Farthingale, and former Misunderstood guitarist Tony Hill in September 1968. The band was later renamed to Feathers following Tony Hill being replaced by former Buzz guitarist John "Hutch" Hutchinson, and later to just David Bowie & Hutch after Farthingale's departure.

Bowie released his second self-titled album in 1969, the album included Junior's Eyes members, guitarists Tim Renwick (who also played woodwind) and Mick Wayne bassist John "Honk" Lodge and drummer John Cambridge, other musicians who played on this album were, guitarist Keith Christmas, keyboardist Rick Wakeman, bassists Tony Visconti (who also played woodwind and was the producer) and Herbie Flowers, harmonicist Benny Marshall and cellist and arranger Paul Buckmaster. The members of Junior's Eyes also performed with Bowie on the Dave Lee Travis Show in October 1969, prior to the album's release, the recording was also released on Bowie at the Beeb in 2000.

In January 1970 Bowie played on Scottish TV show Cairngorm Ski Night, with producer/bassist Tony Visconti, and percussionist Tex Johnson. Bowie's next backing band was called the Hype, it originally included guitarist Mick Ronson, bassist Tony Visconti and drummer John Cambridge. This line-up appeared on The Sunday Show introduced by John Peel in February 1970 and on Sounds of the 70s: Andy Ferris in April 1970, before Cambridge was replaced by Mick "Woody" Woodmansey, this line-up appeared on Bowie's third album The Man Who Sold the World with Ralph Mace on Moog. The band was occasionally joined by Mark Pritchett on guitar. one performance on In Concert with John Peel was billed as David Bowie and friends and also included Pritchett, backing vocalists George Underwood, Dana Gillespie and Geoffrey Alexander and also bassist Trevor Bolder. All performances were included on Bowie at the Beeb.

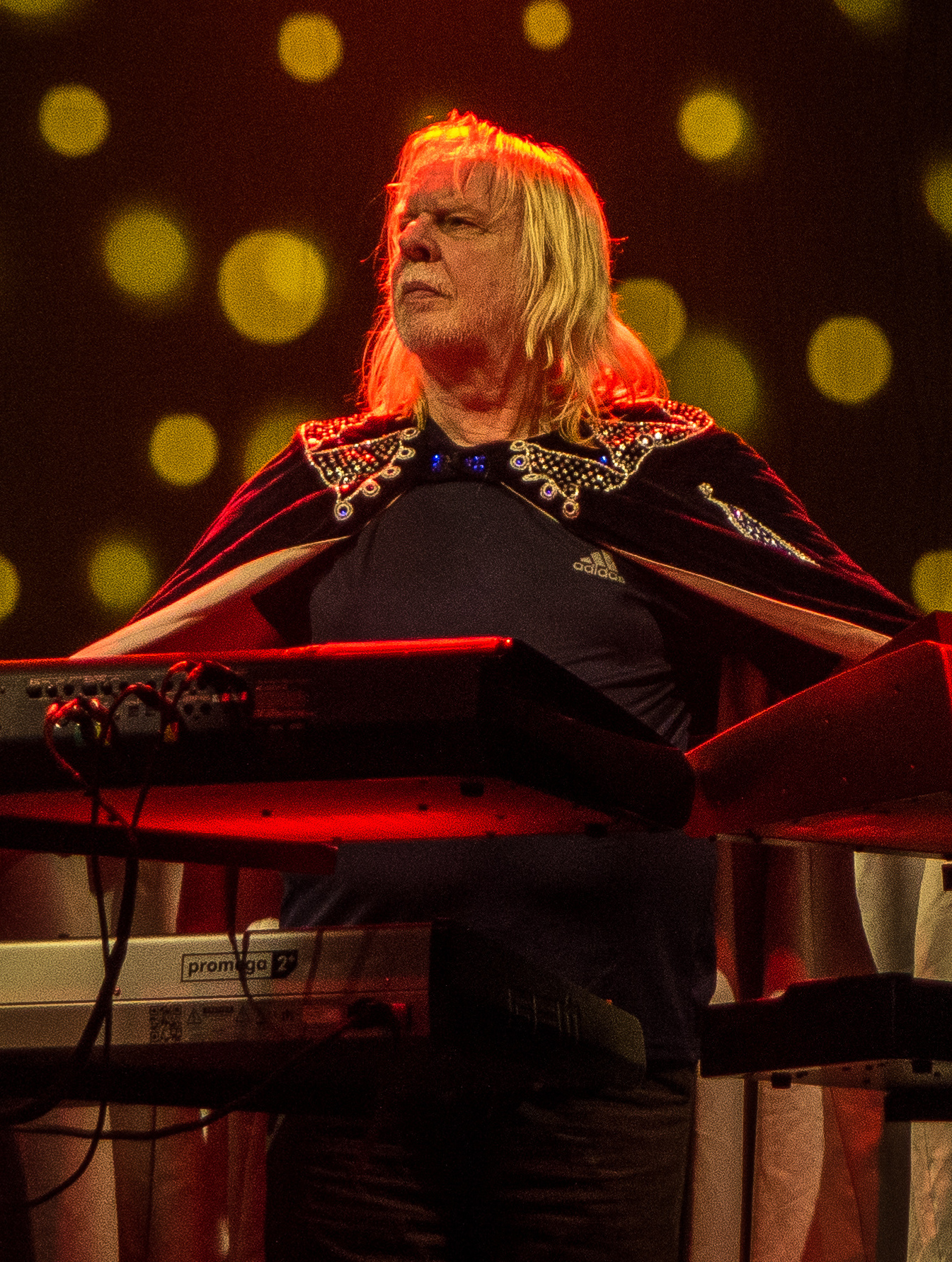
Rick Wakeman played piano with Bowie in 1972 but did not join his new backing band the Spiders from Mars.

Bowie's next backing band included guitarist Mick Ronson, bassist Bolder and drummer Woodmansey from his David Bowie and Friends band. The band was also augmented by pianists Rick Wakeman and Tom Parker, for some shows each. The then unnamed band was later named the Spiders from Mars and was going to included Wakeman but he declined and joined Yes. The band contributed to Bowie's album The Rise and Fall of Ziggy Stardust and the Spiders from Mars, the band was later augmented by various pianists in 1972, including Nicky Graham, Matthew Fisher, Robin Lumley and Mike Garson (who would be a long-time member of the Bowie band). Into 1973, the band was later augmented by Garson, backing vocalist Warren Peace, rhythm guitarist John Hutchinson and saxophonists Ken Fordham and Brian Wilshaw, this line-up contributed to the album Aladdin Sane in 1973, alongside backing vocalists Linda Lewis and Juanita "Honey" Franklin. Most musicians from the Spiders From Mars contributed to Bowie's musical, The 1980 Floor Show in October 1973, and his album Pin Ups in the same month.

Bowie's Diamond Dogs, featured keyboardist Mike Garson, bassist Herbie Flowers, drummers Ansley Dunbar and Tony Newman and guitarist Alan Parker. For the Diamond Dogs Tour in 1974, he employed an entirely different band with only Garson and Peace being retained. Other members included keyboardist Michael Kamen, guitarist Earl Slick, saxophonists David Sanborn and Richard Grando, returning bassist Herbie Flowers, percussionists Tony Newman and Pablo Rosario and new backing vocalist Gui Andrisano, this tour band existed between June and July and featured on the live album David Live, in September the band was expanded with new guitarist Carlos Alomar (who played alongside Slick and also acted as musical director), bassist Doug Rauch and drummer Greg Errico, as well as backing vocalists Ava Cherry, Robin Clark, Anthony Hinton, Diane Sumler and Luther Vandross.

Between October and December, in a tour called The Soul/Philly Dogs Tour, the band included new members Emir Ksasan (bass) and Dennis Davis (drums) with Kamen, Rauch, Errico and Andrisano departing. Various musicians from this tour contributed to Young Americans, as well as a guest appearance from John Lennon. Bowie's next album, Station to Station (1976), included touring members Carlos Alomar, Earl Slick, Dennis Davis and Warren Peace, as well as George Murray (bass guitar), Roy Bittan (piano, organ) and Harry Maslin (melodica, synthesiser, vibraphone, baritone sax). Bowie's new tour, Isolar, it included guitarist Carlos Alomar, Stacy Heydon, bassist George Murray, drummer Dennis Davis and keyboardist Tony Kaye.

Low (1977) included Alomar, Davis and Murray and session contributors Brian Eno, Ricky Gardiner, Roy Young, Eduard Meyer, J. Peter Robinson and Paul Buckmaster and guests Iggy Pop and Mary Visconti. Similar personnel contributed to "Heroes" (1977) and guest musicians Robert Fripp (King Crimson) and Tony Visconti (producer).

The touring rebooted in 1978 as the Isolar II tour, It included a slightly different band, included the returning Alomar, Davis and Murray, with new members Adrian Belew (lead guitar), Roger Powell (keyboards, synthesizer; who was replaced by Dennis Garcia for shows in November), pianist Sean Mayes and violinist Simon House. This was Bowie's last tour of the 70s, some performances were released on Stage. Many musicians from this tour contributed to Lodger (1979).

=== 1980s to 2000s ===
Scary Monsters (and Super Creeps) (1980) included Davis, Murray and Alomar. Following the release of Scary Monsters (and Super Creeps), Bowie was expected to tour; however, the murder of John Lennon in December 1980 made Bowie cancel tour plans. His first tour in 5 years, the Serious Moonlight Tour, kicked off in May 1983. The band included returning members Carlos Alomar and Earl Slick, and also bassist Carmine Rojas, drummer Tony Thompson, keyboardist Dave Lebolt, woodwind players Steve Elson, Stan Harrison and Lenny Pickett and backing vocalists George and Frank Simms.

Let's Dance (1983) included some touring members, including Carmine Rojas, Tony Thompson, Stan Harrison_{,} Steve Elson, George and Frank Simms, and also guest lead guitarist Stevie Ray Vaughan, bassist Bernard Edwards, percussionists Omar Hakim and Sammy Figueroa, keyboardist Robert Sabino, saxophonist Robert Aaron, trumpeter Mac Gollehon and backing vocalist David Spinner. The album was produced by Nile Rodgers who also played guitar on the album. Similar personnel contributed to Tonight (1984).

Bowie performed at Live Aid on 15 July 1985 at Wembley Stadium, with a band including guitarist Kevin Armstrong, keyboardist Thomas Dolby, saxophonist Clare Hirst, bassist Matthew Seligman, percussionists Neil Conti and Pedro Ortiz, and backing vocalists Tessa Niles and Helena Springs. Never Let Me Down (1987) included mainly touring personnel with some session musicians.

The Glass Spider Tour started in May 1987 and concluded in November, the tour band included guitarist Peter Frampton and Carlos Alomar, bassist Carmine Rojas, drummer Alan Childs and multi-instrumentalists Erdal Kızılçay (keyboards, trumpet, congas, violin, backing vocals) and Richard Cottle (keyboardist, saxophone, tambourine, backing vocals).

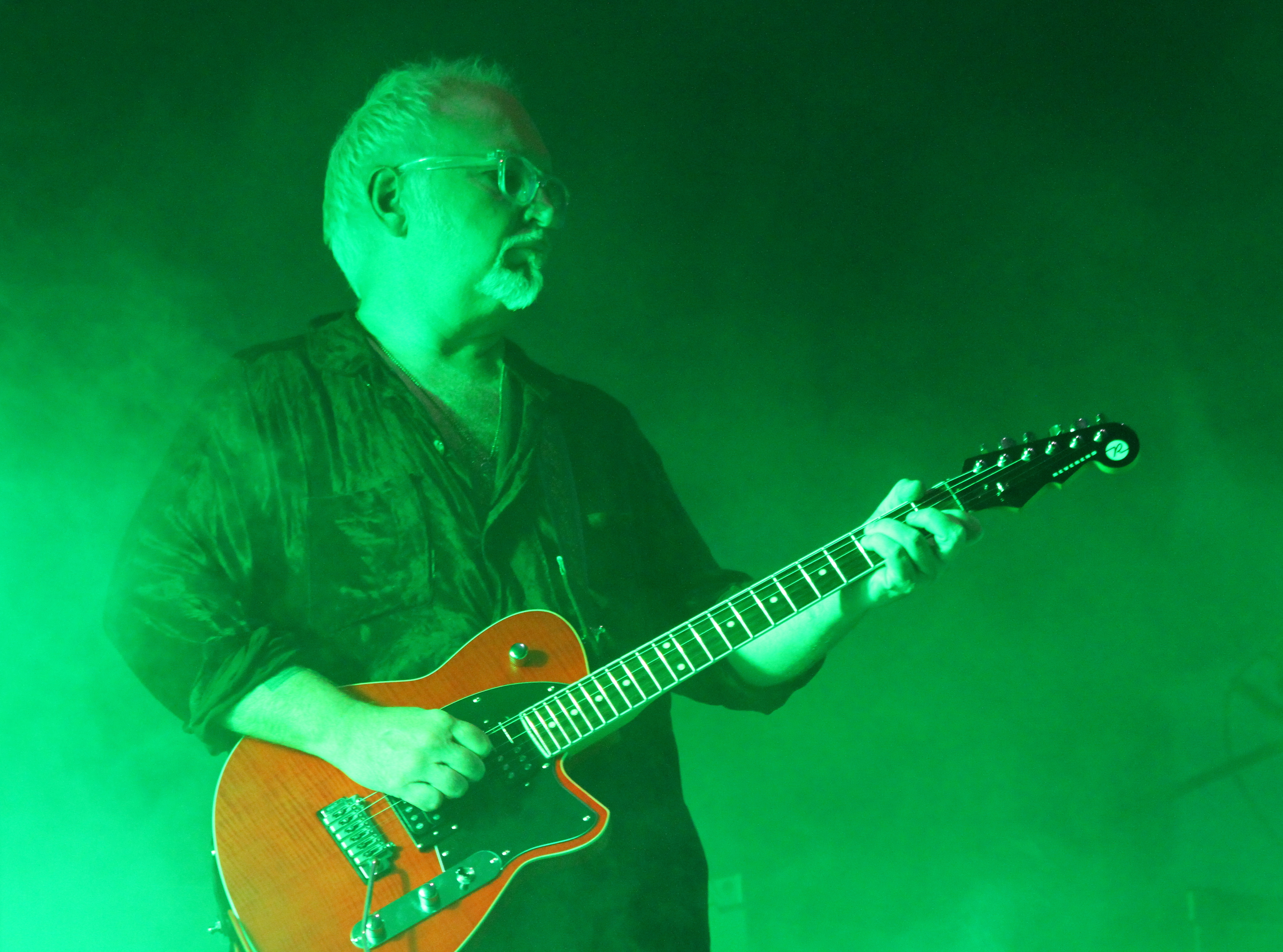
Guitarist Reeves Gabrels first played guitar in Tin Machine with Bowie in 1987 and was a member of his band until 1999.

Bowie was a member of hard rock outfit Tin Machine from 1988 to 1992, the band also included Reeves Gabrels (lead guitar, backing vocals), Tony Fox Sales (bass guitar, backing vocals) and Hunt Sales (drums, backing vocals). They released two albums and toured in support of each, on their first tour, from June to July 1989, they were augmented by Kevin Armstrong (rhythm guitar, backing vocals) and by Eric Schermerhorn on their second tour from October 1991 to February 1992.

Between Tin Machine's two tours, Bowie embarked on the Sound+Vision Tour between March and September 1990. The tour band included returning members Adrian Belew and Erdal Kızılçay (now on bass), as well as new members Rick Fox (keyboards) and Michael Hodges (drums). Black Tie White Noise (1993) included various session musicians, including guest lead guitar from Spiders from Mars guitarist Mick Ronson, who died later that year. The Buddha of Suburbia (1993) included only Bowie and Kızılçay as well as some contributions from members of the band 3D Echo ((Rob Clydesdale, Gary Taylor, Isaac Daniel Prevos)t, Mike Garson and Lenny Kravitz.

Outside (1995) included many past, present and future touring members. His next tour was the Outside Tour between September 1995 and September 1996. The tour band was larger than the Sound+Vision band, it included the returning Carlos Alomar, Mike Garson and George Simms (now on keyboards) as well as Tin Machine guitarist Reeves Gabrels and new members Gail Ann Dorsey (bass guitar, vocals), Zack Alford (drums) and Peter Schwartz (synthesizer).

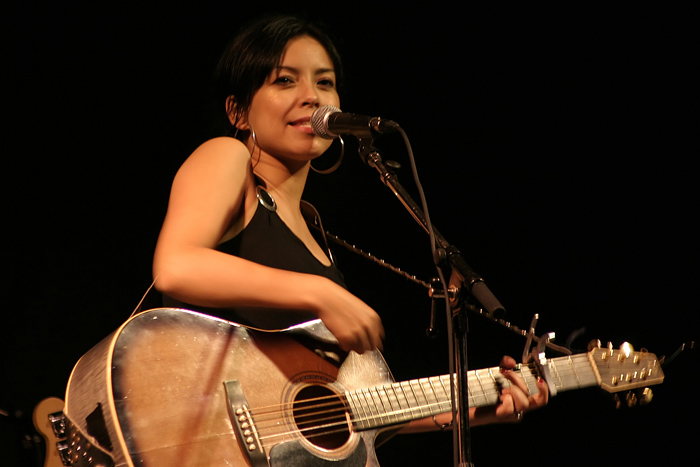
Emm Gryner was backing vocalist and keyboardist for Bowie between 1999 and 2000.

Earthling (1997) featured only touring personnel. The Earthling Tour included only retained members Gabrels, Dorsey, Alford and Garson, it ran from June to November 1997. Hours (1999) also included mainly touring personnel, the Hours Tour, included lead guitarist Page Hamilton, rhythm guitar Mark Plati, bassist Gail Ann Dorsey, drummer Sterling Campbell, keyboardist Mike Garson and backing vocalists Holly Palmer and Emm Gryner. Reeves Gabrels performed at one show on the tour before being replaced by Hamilton due to personal differences. The tour ran between October and December 1999.

The Mini Tour included only four dates, all in June 2000, and featured the same tour band except Hamilton, who was replaced by the returning Earl Slick. It included a show at Glastonbury which was later described as "iconic". Heathen (2002) included various session musicians, including longtime producer Tony Visconti drummer Matt Chamberlain, guitarist David Torn, violinist Lisa Germano, bassist Tony Levin, and guest guitarists Pete Townshend (The Who) and Dave Grohl (Foo Fighters). Around this time, music that was later released on Toy (2019) was recorded.

Bowie's next tour was the Heathen Tour, between June and October 2002, which included a similar band except Palmer and Gryner departed and Catherine Russell (keyboards, percussion, backing vocals) and Gerry Leonard (guitar, keyboards, backing vocals) joined. Reality (2003) included all of his touring band as well as David Torn, Visconti, Chamberlain Mario J. McNulty and Carlos Alomar. Bowie's final tour, A Reality Tour, included the same band as his previous tour, it started in October 2003 and concluded in June 2004.

Following the conclusion of this tour, Bowie did three more live performances. First was at Condé Nast Fashion Rocks on 8 September 2005, which featured three songs first was "Life on Mars" with piano backing from Mike Garson, and the last two were "Wake Up" and "Five Years", both with Indie rock band Arcade Fire. Next was with David Gilmour at the Royal Albert Hall in May 2006 where he performed on Pink Floyd songs "Arnold Layne" and "Comfortably Numb". His final performance was at the Hammerstein Ballroom, NYC as part of the Keep a Child Alive's annual Black Ball fundraiser, where he performed "Wild Is The Wind" (with Mike Garson), "Fantastic Voyage" (with Alicia Keys’' band) and "Changes" (with Alicia Keys). He even announced a comeback gig in 2007 as part of New York's High Line festival, but it was cancelled a few months later without explanation.

Bowie releases two more studio albums The Next Day (2013) and Blackstar (2016) the former included former touring members and other guests, the latter included session musicians Donny McCaslin (woodwind), Jason Lindner (keyboards), Tim Lefebvre (bass), Mark Guiliana (drums), Ben Monder (guitar), James Murphy (percussion) and Erin Tonkon (backing vocals). the album was co-produced with longtime collaborator Tony Visconti. It was his final album released in this lifetime, following his death in January 2016. Various posthumous live albums and a studio album, called Toy, have been released following his death.

== Members ==
Image	Name	Years active	Instruments	Release contributions
	David Bowie (David Jones)	1962–2016 (until his death)	vocals; guitar; keyboards; saxophone; harmonica; stylophone; percussion	all releases
	Neville Wills	1962–1963 (only with The Konrads) (died 1981)	guitar	none
	George Underwood	1962; 1963–1964; 1971	vocals; guitar; harmonica	"Liza Jane" (1964); Bowie at the Beeb (2000)
	Dave Cook	1962 (only with The Konrads)	drums	none
	Dave Hadfield	1962–1963 (only with The Konrads)	drums	none
	Roger Ferris	1962–1963 (only with The Konrads)	vocals	none
	Christine Patton	1962–1963 (only with The Konrads)	vocals	none
	Stella Patton	1962–1963 (only with The Konrads)	vocals	none
	Alan Dodds	1962–1963 (only with The Konrads)	rhythm guitar	none
	Rocky Shahan	1962–1963 (only with The Konrads)	bass	none
	Viv Andrews	1963–1964 (only with The Hooker Brothers/Dave's Reds and Blues)	drums	none
	Robert Allen	1964 (only with the King Bees)	drums	"Liza Jane" (1964)
	Dave Howard	1964 (only with the King Bees)	bass	"Liza Jane" (1964)
	Roger Bluck	1964 (only with the King Bees)	lead guitar	"Liza Jane" (1964)
	Johnny Flux (Johnny Edward)	1964–1965 (only with The Manish Boys) (died 2021)	lead guitar	"I Pity the Fool" (1965)
	Bob Solly	1964–1965 (only with The Manish Boys) (died 2016)	keyboards	"I Pity the Fool" (1965)
	Paul Rodriguez	1964–1965 (only with The Manish Boys)	tenor saxophone; trumpet	"I Pity the Fool" (1965)
	Woolf Byrne	1964–1965 (only with The Manish Boys)	baritone saxophone	"I Pity the Fool" (1965)
	John Watson	1964–1965 (only with The Manish Boys)	bass	"I Pity the Fool" (1965)
	Mick White	1964–1965 (only with The Manish Boys)	drums	"I Pity the Fool" (1965)
	Denis Taylor	1965–1966 (only with the Lower Third)	guitar	"You've Got a Habit of Leaving" (1965); "Can't Help Thinking About Me" (1966)
	Graham Rivens	1965–1966 (only with the Lower Third)	bass	"You've Got a Habit of Leaving" (1965); "Can't Help Thinking About Me" (1966)
	Les Mighall	1965 (only with the Lower Third) (died 2008)	drums	none
	Phil Lancaster	1965–1966 (only with the Lower Third)	drums	"You've Got a Habit of Leaving" (1965); "Can't Help Thinking About Me" (1966)
	John Eager	1966–1967 (only with the Buzz)	drums	"Do Anything You Say" (1966); "I Dig Everything" (1966); "Rubber Band" (1966); "The Laughing Gnome" (1967); "Love You till Tuesday" (1967); David Bowie (1967)
	Derek Boyes	1966–1967 (only with the Buzz)	keyboards	"Do Anything You Say" (1966); "I Dig Everything" (1966); "Rubber Band" (1966); "The Laughing Gnome" (1967); "Love You till Tuesday" (1967); David Bowie (1967)
	Derek "Dek" Fearnley	1966–1967 (only with the Buzz) (died 2008)	bass	"Do Anything You Say" (1966); "I Dig Everything" (1966); "Rubber Band" (1966); "The Laughing Gnome" (1967); "Love You till Tuesday" (1967); David Bowie (1967)
	John Hutchinson	1966; 1968–1969; 1973 (died 2021)	guitar; vocals; tape op	"Do Anything You Say" (1966); Ziggy Stardust: The Motion Picture (1983)
	Billy Gray	1966 (only with the Buzz)	guitar	"I Dig Everything" (1966)
	Big Jim Sullivan	1966–1967 (session) (died 2012)	guitar; banjo; sitar	David Bowie (1967)
	Rod "Rook" Davis	1967 (only with The Riot Squad)	guitar	"Gotta Be a First Time" / "Bittersweet Love" (1967)
	Bob Evans	1967 (only with The Riot Squad)	saxophone; flute; backing vocals	"Gotta Be a First Time" / "Bittersweet Love" (1967)
	George Butcher	1967 (only with The Riot Squad)	keyboards	"Gotta Be a First Time" / "Bittersweet Love" (1967)
	Brian "Croke" Prebble	1967 (only with The Riot Squad)	bass; backing vocals	"Gotta Be a First Time" / "Bittersweet Love" (1967)
	Derek "Del" Roll	1967 (only with The Riot Squad)	drums	"Gotta Be a First Time" / "Bittersweet Love" (1967)
	Tony Visconti	1968; 1969 (session); 1970 (production and session thereafter)	bass; backing vocals; flute; recorder; piano; guitar; production; string arrangements	David Bowie (1969); The World of David Bowie (1970); The Man Who Sold the World (1970); David Live (1974); Young Americans (1975); Low (1977); "Heroes" (1977); Stage (1978); Lodger (1979); Scary Monsters (and Super Creeps) (1980); Bowie at the Beeb (2000); Heathen (2002); Reality (2003); The Next Day (2013); Blackstar (2016); Welcome To The Blackout (Live London ’78) (2018); Toy (2021)
	Herbie Flowers	1968 (one off); 1969 (session); 1974; (died 2024)	bass guitar	David Bowie (1969); Diamond Dogs (1974); Bowie at the Beeb (2000)
	John McLaughlin	1968 (one off)	guitar	The World of David Bowie (1970); Bowie at the Beeb (2000)
	Barry Morgan	1968 (one off) (died 2007)	drums	The World of David Bowie (1970); Bowie at the Beeb (2000)
	Steve Peregrin Took	1968 (one off) (died 1980)	backing vocals; pixiephone	The World of David Bowie (1970); Bowie at the Beeb (2000)
	Alan Hawkshaw	1968 (one off) (died 2021)	keyboards	Bowie at the Beeb (2000)
	Hermione Farthingale	1968–1969 (as Turquoise and Feathers)	vocals; guitar; dance	none
	Tony Hill	1968 (as Turquoise) (died 2022)	vocals; guitar	none
	John Cambridge	1969–1970	drums	David Bowie (1969); Bowie at the Beeb (2000)
	Mick Wayne	1969–1970 (only with Junior's Eyes) (died 1994)	guitar	David Bowie (1969); Bowie at the Beeb (2000)
	Tim Renwick	1969–1970 (only with Junior's Eyes)	guitar; flute; recorder	David Bowie (1969); Bowie at the Beeb (2000)
	John "Honk" Lodge	1969–1970 (only with Junior's Eyes)	bass	David Bowie (1969); Bowie at the Beeb (2000)
	Keith Christmas	1969 (session) (died 2026)	acoustic guitar	David Bowie (1969)
	Terry Cox	1969 (session) (died 2026)	drums	David Bowie (1969)
	Paul Buckmaster	1969; 1976 (both session) (died 2017)	cello; pianos and ARP	David Bowie (1969); Low (1977)
	Ralph Mace	1970 (session)	Moog synthesiser	The Man Who Sold the World (1970)
	Tex Johnson	1970 (touring)	congas; percussion	none
	Mick Ronson	1970; 1971–1973; 1993 (session) (died 1993)	guitar; piano; keyboards; backing vocals; bass	The Man Who Sold the World (1970); Hunky Dory (1971); The Rise and Fall of Ziggy Stardust and the Spiders from Mars (1972); Aladdin Sane (1973); Pin Ups (1973); Ziggy Stardust: The Motion Picture (1983); Black Tie White Noise (1993); Santa Monica '72 (1994); Bowie at the Beeb (2000); Live Santa Monica '72 (2008)
	Mick "Woody" Woodmansey	1970; 1971–1973	drums	The Man Who Sold the World (1970); Hunky Dory (1971); The Rise and Fall of Ziggy Stardust and the Spiders from Mars (1972); Aladdin Sane (1973); Ziggy Stardust: The Motion Picture (1983); Santa Monica '72 (1994); Bowie at the Beeb (2000); Live Santa Monica '72 (2008)
	Mark Carr-Pritchett	1970–1971; 1973	guitar; vocals	Bowie at the Beeb (2000)
	Benny Marshall	1970	vocals; harmonica	David Bowie (1969)
	Rudi Valentino (Freddie Burretti) (stand in)	1971 (only with Arnold Corns) (died 2001)	vocals	none
	Tim Broadbent	1971 (only with Arnold Corns)	drums	none
	Pete De Somogyl	1971 (only with Arnold Corns)	bass	none
	Trevor Bolder	1971–1973 (died 2013)	bass; trumpet; backing vocals	Hunky Dory (1971); The Rise and Fall of Ziggy Stardust and the Spiders from Mars (1972); Aladdin Sane (1973); Pin Ups (1973); Aladdin Sane (1973); Ziggy Stardust: The Motion Picture (1983); Santa Monica '72 (1994); Bowie at the Beeb (2000); Live Santa Monica '72 (2008)
	Rick Wakeman	1969; 1971; 1972 (session)	piano	David Bowie (1969); Hunky Dory (1971); The Rise and Fall of Ziggy Stardust and the Spiders from Mars (1972)
	Warren Peace (Geoffrey Alexander MacCormack)	1971; 1972–1974	backing vocals; percussion	Aladdin Sane (1973); Pin Ups (1973); David Live (1974); Station to Station (1976); Ziggy Stardust: The Motion Picture (1983); Bowie at the Beeb (2000); Cracked Actor (Live Los Angeles '74) (2017); I'm Only Dancing (The Soul Tour 74) (2020)
	Dana Gillespie	1971 (one off)	backing vocals	The Rise and Fall of Ziggy Stardust and the Spiders from Mars (1972); Bowie at the Beeb (2000)
	Tom Parker	1971 (one off) (died 2013)	piano	none
	Nicky Graham	1972 (touring) (died 2024)	piano	Bowie at the Beeb (2000)
	Matthew Fisher	1972 (touring)	piano	none
	Robin Lumley	1972 (touring) (died 2023)	piano	none
	Mike Garson	1972–1973; 1974; 1994–2004	piano; keyboards; Mellotron; backing vocals (1996–1997)	Aladdin Sane (1973); Pin Ups (1973); Diamond Dogs (1974); David Live (1974); Ziggy Stardust: The Motion Picture (1983); Black Tie White Noise (1993); The Buddha of Suburbia (1993); Santa Monica '72 (1994); Outside (1995); Earthling (1997); Reality (2003); Live Santa Monica '72 (2008); VH1 Storytellers (2009); A Reality Tour (2010); Cracked Actor (Live Los Angeles '74) (2017); Glastonbury 2000 (2018); Is It Any Wonder? (2020); I'm Only Dancing (The Soul Tour 74) (2020); ChangesNowBowie (2020); Ouvrez le Chien (Live Dallas 95) (2020); Something in the Air (Live Paris 99) (2020); Bowie at the Beeb (2000); Toy (2021)
	Juanita "Honey" Franklin	1972–1973 (session)	backing vocals	Aladdin Sane (1973)
	Linda Lewis	1972–1973 (session) (died 2023)	backing vocals	Aladdin Sane (1973)
	Ken Fordham	1973	saxophone	Aladdin Sane (1973); Pin Ups (1973); Ziggy Stardust: The Motion Picture (1983)
	Brian Wilshaw	1973	saxophone; flute	Aladdin Sane (1973); Ziggy Stardust: The Motion Picture (1983)
	Aynsley Dunbar	1973–1974	drums	Pin Ups (1973); Diamond Dogs (1974)
	Ava Cherry	1973; 1974	vocals	David Live (1974); Young Americans (1975); Cracked Actor (Live Los Angeles '74) (2017)
	Jason Guess	1973	vocals	none
	Earl Slick (Frank Madeloni)	1974; 1983; 2000–2004	lead guitar	David Live (1974); Young Americans (1975); Station to Station (1976); Serious Moonlight (1983); Bowie at the Beeb (2000); Reality (2003); A Reality Tour (2010); The Next Day (2013); Cracked Actor (Live Los Angeles '74) (2017); Glastonbury 2000 (2018); I'm Only Dancing (The Soul Tour 74) (2020); Toy (2021)
	Michael Kamen	1974 (touring) (died 2003)	electric piano; Moog synthesizer; oboe; musical director	David Live (1974)
	Pablo Rosario	1974 (touring)	percussion	David Live (1974); Young Americans (1975); Cracked Actor (Live Los Angeles '74) (2017); I'm Only Dancing (The Soul Tour 74) (2020)
	David Sanborn	1974 (touring) (died 2024)	saxophone; flute	David Live (1974); Cracked Actor (Live Los Angeles '74) (2017); I'm Only Dancing (The Soul Tour 74) (2020)
	Richard Grando	1974 (touring)	saxophone; flute	David Live (1974); Cracked Actor (Live Los Angeles '74) (2017)
	Gui Andrisano	1974 (touring)	backing vocals	David Live (1974); Cracked Actor (Live Los Angeles '74) (2017)
	Tony Newman	1974	drums	Diamond Dogs (1974)
	Carlos Alomar	1974–1984; 1986–1987; 1995–1996	guitar; backing vocals; percussion	Young Americans (1975); Station to Station (1976); Low (1977); "Heroes" (1977); Stage (1978); Lodger (1979); Scary Monsters (and Super Creeps) (1980); Serious Moonlight (1983); Tonight (1984); Never Let Me Down (1987); Outside (1995); Heathen (2002); Reality (2003); Glass Spider (2007); Live Nassau Coliseum '76 (2017); Cracked Actor (Live Los Angeles '74) (2017); Welcome to the Blackout (Live London '78) (2018); Is It Any Wonder? (2020); I'm Only Dancing (The Soul Tour 74) (2020); ChangesNowBowie (2020); Ouvrez le Chien (Live Dallas 95) (2020)
	Doug Rauch	1974 (touring) (died 1979)	bass	Cracked Actor (Live Los Angeles '74) (2017)
	Greg Errico	1974 (touring)	drums	Cracked Actor (Live Los Angeles '74) (2017)
	Robin Clark	1974; 1984 (session); 1986 (session)	backing vocals	Young Americans (1975); Tonight (1984); Never Let Me Down (1987); Cracked Actor (Live Los Angeles '74) (2017); I'm Only Dancing (The Soul Tour 74) (2020)
	Anthony Hinton	1974	backing vocals	Young Americans (1975); Cracked Actor (Live Los Angeles '74) (2017); I'm Only Dancing (The Soul Tour 74) (2020)
	Diane Sumler	1974	backing vocals	Young Americans (1975); Cracked Actor (Live Los Angeles '74) (2017); I'm Only Dancing (The Soul Tour 74) (2020)
	Luther Vandross	1974 (died 2005)	backing vocals	Young Americans (1975); Cracked Actor (Live Los Angeles '74) (2017); I'm Only Dancing (The Soul Tour 74) (2020)
	Willie Weeks	1974 (session)	bass	Young Americans (1975)
	Andy Newmark	1974 (session)	drums	Young Americans (1975)
	Dennis Davis	1974–1980 (died 2016)	drums; percussion; occasional backing vocals	Young Americans (1975); Station to Station (1976); Low (1977); "Heroes" (1977); Stage (1978); Scary Monsters (and Super Creeps) (1980); Live Nassau Coliseum '76 (2017); I'm Only Dancing(The Soul Tour 74) (2020)
	Emir Ksasan	1974	bass	Young Americans (1975)
	George Murray	1976–1980	bass; backing vocals	Station to Station (1976); Low (1977); "Heroes" (1977); Stage (1978); Scary Monsters (and Super Creeps) (1980); Live Nassau Coliseum '76 (2017); Welcome to the Blackout (Live London '78) (2018)
	Tony Kaye (Anthony John Selvidge)	1976 (touring)	keyboards	Live Nassau Coliseum '76 (2017)
	Stacy Heydon	1976 (touring)	lead guitar; backing vocals	Live Nassau Coliseum '76 (2017)
	Brian Eno	1976–1979; 1994–1995 (both session)	keyboards; synthesizer; backing vocals	Low (1977); "Heroes" (1977); Lodger (1979); Outside (1995)
	Ricky Gardiner	1976 (session) (died 2022)	lead and rhythm guitar	Low (1977)
	Roy Young	1976 (session) (died 2018)	piano; organ	Low (1977)
	Antonia Maass (Maaß)	1977 (session)	backing vocals	"Heroes" (1977)
	Robert Fripp	1977; 1980 (both session)	lead guitar	"Heroes" (1977); Scary Monsters (and Super Creeps) (1980)
	Adrian Belew	1978; 1990	lead guitar; backing vocals	Stage (1978); Lodger (1979); Welcome to the Blackout (Live London '78) (2018)
	Sean Mayes	1978 (died 1995)	piano; string ensemble; backing vocals	Stage (1978); Lodger (1979); Welcome to the Blackout (Live London '78) (2018)
	Simon House	1978 (died 2025)	electric violin	Stage (1978); Lodger (1979); Welcome to the Blackout (Live London '78) (2018)
	Roger Powell	1978	keyboards; synthesizer; backing vocals	Stage (1978); Lodger (1979); Welcome to the Blackout (Live London '78) (2018)
	Dennis Garcia	1978 (substitute)	keyboards; synthesizer; backing vocals	none
	Stan Harrison	1978 (session); 1982–1984; 1986 (session)	saxophones; woodwind	Lodger (1979); Let's Dance (1983); Serious Moonlight (1983); Never Let Me Down (1987); Heathen (2002)
	Roy Bittan	1980 (session)	piano	Scary Monsters (and Super Creeps) (1980)
	Andy Clark	1980 (session)	synthesizer	Scary Monsters (and Super Creeps) (1980)
	Lynn Maitland	1980 (session)	backing vocals	Scary Monsters (and Super Creeps) (1980)
	Chris Porter	1980 (session)	backing vocals	Scary Monsters (and Super Creeps) (1980)
	Carmine Rojas	1982–1984; 1986–1987	bass	Let's Dance (1983); Serious Moonlight (1983); Tonight (1984); Never Let Me Down (1987); Glass Spider (2007)
	Steve Elson	1982–1984; 1986 (session); 2012 (session)	saxophones; woodwind	Let's Dance (1983); Serious Moonlight (1983); Never Let Me Down (1987); Heathen (2002); The Next Day (2013)
	George Simms	1982–1984; 1995–1996	backing vocals; keyboards	Let's Dance (1983); Serious Moonlight (1983); ChangesNowBowie (2020)
	Frank Simms	1982–1983	backing vocals	Let's Dance (1983); Serious Moonlight (1983)
	Sammy Figueroa	1982; 1984 (both session)	percussion	Let's Dance (1983); Tonight (1984)
	Omar Hakim	1982; 1984 (both session)	drums	Let's Dance (1983); Tonight (1984)
	Nile Rodgers	1982; 1992 (both session)	guitar	Let's Dance (1983); Black Tie White Noise (1993)
	David Spinner	1982 (session)	backing vocals	Let's Dance (1983)
	Stevie Ray Vaughan	1982 (session) (died 1990)	lead guitar	Let's Dance (1983)
	Robert Sabino	1982 (session)	keyboards; piano	Let's Dance (1983)
	Mac Gollehon	1982 (session)	trumpet	Let's Dance (1983)
	Robert Aaron	1982 (session)	tenor saxophone	Let's Dance (1983)
	Tony Thompson	1982–1983 (died 2003)	drums; percussion	Let's Dance (1983); Serious Moonlight (1983)
	Lenny Pickett	1983–1984; 1986 (session)	saxophones; woodwind	Serious Moonlight (1983); Never Let Me Down (1987); Heathen (2002)
	Dave Lebolt	1983 (touring)	keyboards; synthesizer	Serious Moonlight (1983)
	Curtis King	1984; 1993 (both session)	backing vocals	Tonight (1984); Black Tie White Noise (1993)
	Derek Bramble	1984 (session)	guitar; bass; synthesizers; backing vocals	Tonight (1984)
	Guy St. Onge	1984 (session)	marimba	Tonight (1984)
	Mark Pender	1984 (session)	flugelhorn; trumpet	Tonight (1984)
	Arif Mardin	1984 (session) (died 2006)	string arrangements; synthesisers	Tonight (1984)
	Kevin Armstrong	1985; 1989	guitar; backing vocals; keyboards (studio)	Tin Machine (1988); Tin Machine II (1991); Outside (1995)
	Matthew Seligman	1985 (one off) (died 2020)	bass	none
	Thomas Dolby	1985 (one off)	keyboards; synthesisers	none
	Clare Hirst	1985 (one off)	saxophone	none
	Neil Conti	1985 (one off)	drums	none
	Pedro Ortiz	1985 (one off)	percussion	none
	Tessa Niles	1985 (one off)	backing vocals	none
	Helena Springs	1985 (one off)	backing vocals	none
	Erdal Kızılçay	1986–1987; 1990; 1994–1995 (session)	keyboards; trumpet; congas; violin; bass; backing vocals; drums	Never Let Me Down (1987); The Buddha of Suburbia (1993); Outside (1995); Glass Spider (2007)
	Peter Frampton	1986–1987	guitar; backing vocals	Never Let Me Down (1987); Glass Spider (2007)
	Philippe Saisse	1986; 1992 (both session)	piano; keyboards	Never Let Me Down (1987)
	Laurie Frink	1986 (session) (died 2013)	trumpet	Never Let Me Down (1987)
	Earl Gardner	1986 (session)	flugelhorn	Never Let Me Down (1987)
	Errol "Crusher" Bennett	1986 (session)	percussion	Never Let Me Down (1987)
	Lani Groves	1986 (session)	backing vocals	Never Let Me Down (1987)
	Diva Gray	1986 (died 2024)	backing vocals	Never Let Me Down (1987)
	Gordon Grody	1986	backing vocals	Never Let Me Down (1987)
	Richard Cottle	1987	keyboards; saxophone; tambourine; backing vocals	Glass Spider (2007)
	Alan Childs	1987	drums	Glass Spider (2007)
	Reeves Gabrels	1987–1989; 1991–1999	guitar; backing vocals	all Tin Machine releases; Black Tie White Noise (1993); Outside (1995); Earthling (1997); Hours (1999); VH1 Storytellers (2009); ChangesNowBowie (2020); Ouvrez le Chien (Live Dallas 95) (2020)
	Tony Fox Sales	1987–1989; 1991–1992 (only with Tin Machine)	bass; backing vocals	all Tin Machine releases
	Hunt Sales	1987–1989; 1991–1992 (only with Tin Machine)	drums; vocals	all Tin Machine releases
	Rick Fox	1990 (touring)	keyboards; backing vocals	none
	Michael Hodges	1990 (touring)	drums	none
	Eric Schermerhorn	1991–1992 (touring)	guitar; backing vocals	Tin Machine Live: Oy Vey, Baby (1992)
	Dave Richards	1992 (session) (died 2013)	keyboards	Black Tie White Noise (1993)
	Richard Tee	1992 (session) (died 1993)	keyboards	Black Tie White Noise (1993)
	Richard Hilton	1992 (session)	keyboards	Black Tie White Noise (1993)
	Poogie Bell	1992 (session)	drums	Black Tie White Noise (1993)
	Barry Campbell	1992 (session)	bass	Black Tie White Noise (1993)
	John Regan	1992 (session) (died 2023)	bass	Black Tie White Noise (1993)
	Michael Reisman	1992 (session)	harp; tubular bells; string arrangement	Black Tie White Noise (1993)
	Gerardo Velez	1992 (session)	percussion	Black Tie White Noise (1993)
	Fonzi Thornton	1992 (session)	backing vocals	Black Tie White Noise (1993)
	Tawatha Agee	1992 (session)	backing vocals	Black Tie White Noise (1993)
	Dennis Collins	1992 (session)	backing vocals	Black Tie White Noise (1993)
	Brenda White-King	1992 (session)	backing vocals	Black Tie White Noise (1993)
	Maryl Epps	1992 (session)	backing vocals	Black Tie White Noise (1993)
	Yossi Fine	1995 (session)	bass	Outside (1995)
	Joey Baron	1995 (session)	drums	Outside (1995)
	Gail Ann Dorsey	1995–2004	bass; rhythm guitar; keyboards; clarinet; vocals	Earthling (1997); Bowie at the Beeb (2000); Reality (2003); VH1 Storytellers (2009); A Reality Tour (2010); The Next Day (2013); Glastonbury 2000 (2018); Is It Any Wonder? (2020); ChangesNowBowie (2020); Ouvrez le Chien (Live Dallas 95) (2020); Something in the Air (Live Paris 99) (2020); Toy (2021)
	Zachary Alford	1995–1997	drums; percussion	Earthling (1997); The Next Day (2013); Is It Any Wonder? (2020); ChangesNowBowie (2020); Ouvrez le Chien (Live Dallas 95) (2020)
	Peter Schwartz	1995–1996 (touring)	synthesizer	Is It Any Wonder? (2020); ChangesNowBowie (2020)
	Sterling Campbell	1992; 1994–1995 (both session); 1999–2004	drums; percussion	Black Tie White Noise (1993); Outside (1995); Hours (1999); Heathen (2002); Reality (2003); VH1 Storytellers (2009); A Reality Tour (2010); The Next Day (2013); Glastonbury 2000 (2018); Something in the Air (Live Paris 99) (2020); Toy (2021)
	Mark Plati	1999–2002 (session before hand)	guitar; bass; backing vocals; keyboards; programming; production	Earthling (1997); Hours (1999); Heathen (2002); Reality (2003); VH1 Storytellers (2009); Glastonbury 2000 (2018); Is It Any Wonder? (2020); ChangesNowBowie (2020); Something in the Air (Live Paris 99) (2020); Bowie at the Beeb (2000); Toy (2021)
	Holly Palmer	1999–2000 (touring)	backing vocals; percussion	Hours (1999); Bowie at the Beeb (2000); VH1 Storytellers (2009); Glastonbury 2000 (2018); Something in the Air (Live Paris 99) (2020); Toy (2021)
	Emm Gryner	1999–2000 (touring)	backing vocals; keyboards; clarinet	Bowie at the Beeb (2000); Glastonbury 2000 (2018); Something in the Air (Live Paris 99) (2020); Toy (2021)
	Mike Levesque	1999 (session)	drums; percussion	Hours (1999)
	Page Hamilton	1999 (touring)	lead guitar	Something in the Air (Live Paris 99) (2020)
	Gerry Leonard	2000 (session); 2002–2004; 2011–2012 (session)	guitar; keyboards; backing vocals	Heathen (2002); Reality (2003); A Reality Tour (2010); The Next Day (2013); Toy (2021)
	David Torn	2001–2002; 2011–2012 (both session)	guitars; guitar loops; Omnichord	Heathen (2002); Reality (2003); The Next Day (2013)
	Matt Chamberlain	2001–2002 (session)	drums; drum loop programming; percussion	Heathen (2002); Reality (2003)
	Catherine Russell	2002–2004	backing vocals; keyboards; percussion; guitar	Reality (2003); A Reality Tour (2010)
	Donny McCaslin	2015 (session)	tenor saxophone; flute	Blackstar (2016)
	Jason Lindner	2015 (session)	piano; Wurlitzer organ; keyboards	Blackstar (2016)
	Tim Lefebvre	2015 (session)	bass	Blackstar (2016)
	Mark Guiliana	2015 (session)	drums; percussion	Blackstar (2016)
	Ben Monder	2015 (session)	guitar	Blackstar (2016)

== Line-ups ==
Period	Members	Releases
June – Late 1962 (The Konrads)	George Underwood – vocals; David Jones – saxophone, vocals; Neville Wills – guitar; Dave Cook – drums	
Late 1962 – Mid 1963 (The Konrads)	David Jones – saxophone, vocals; Neville Wills – lead guitar; Rocky Shahan – bass guitar; Dave Hadfield – drums; Roger Ferris – vocals; Christine Patton – vocals; Stella Patton – vocals; Alan Dodds – rhythm guitar	
July – November 1963 (The Hooker Brothers/Dave's Reds and Blues)	Davie Jones – vocals, saxophone; George Underwood – guitar, harmonica; Viv Andrews – drums	
1964 (Davie Jones and the King Bees)	Davie Jones – vocals, saxophone; George Underwood – vocals, rhythm guitar, harmonica; Roger Bluck – lead guitar; Dave Howard – bass guitar; Robert Allen – drums	"Liza Jane" (1964)
1964/5 (The Manish Boys)	Davie Jones – vocals, saxophone; John Watson – bass guitar; Johnny Flux – guitar; Paul Rodriguez – tenor saxophone, trumpet; Woolf Byrne – baritone saxophone; Bob Solly – keyboards; Mick White – drums	"I Pity the Fool" (1965)
Early 1965 (Davie Jones and the Lower Third)	Davie Jones – vocals, saxophone, guitar; Denis Taylor – guitar, backing vocals; Graham Rivens – bass guitar, backing vocals; Les Mighall – drums	
1965/6 (Davie Jones and the Lower Third)	Davie Jones – vocals, saxophone, guitar; Denis Taylor – guitar, backing vocals; Graham Rivens – bass guitar, backing vocals; Phil Lancaster – drums, backing vocals	"You've Got a Habit of Leaving" (1965); "Can't Help Thinking About Me" (1966)
February – June 1966 (David Bowie and the Buzz)	David Bowie – vocals; John Hutchinson – guitar, backing vocals; Derek Boyes – keyboards, backing vocals; Derek Fearnley – bass guitar, backing vocals; John Eager – drums, backing vocals	"Do Anything You Say" (1966)
June – November 1966 (David Bowie and the Buzz)	David Bowie – vocals; Derek Boyes – keyboards, backing vocals; Derek Fearnley – bass guitar, backing vocals; John Eager – drums, backing vocals; Billy Gray – guitar	"I Dig Everything" (1966)
November – December 1966 (David Bowie and the Buzz)	David Bowie – vocals; Derek Boyes – keyboards, backing vocals; Derek Fearnley – bass guitar, backing vocals; John Eager – drums, backing vocals; Big Jim Sullivan – guitar, banjo, sitar (session)	"Rubber Band" (1966); "The Laughing Gnome" (1967); "Love You till Tuesday" (1967); David Bowie (1967)
March – May 1967 (The Riot Squad)	David Bowie – vocals, guitar, harmonica; Bob Evans – saxophone, flute; Rod ‘Rook’ Davis – guitar; George Butcher – keyboards; Brian ‘Croke’ Prebble – bass guitar, vocals; Derek ‘Del’ Roll – drums	"Gotta Be a First Time" / "Bittersweet Love" (1967)
May 1968 (as The Tony Visconti Orchestra)	David Bowie – vocals; Herbie Flowers – bass; Barry Morgan – drums; John McLaughlin – guitar; Alan Hawkshaw – keyboards; Tony Visconti – backing vocals; Steve Peregrin Took – backing vocals	Bowie at the Beeb (2000) (tracks 1–4)
September – November 1968 (Turquoise)	David Bowie – vocals, guitar, mime; Hermione Farthingale – vocals, guitar, dance; Tony Hill – vocals, guitar	
November 1968 – March 1969 (Feathers)	David Bowie – vocals, guitar, mime; Hermione Farthingale – vocals, guitar, dance; John ‘Hutch’ Hutchinson – vocals, guitar, tape op	
March 1969 (David Bowie and Hutch)	David Bowie – vocals, guitar, mime; John ‘Hutch’ Hutchinson – vocals, guitar, tape op	
June 1969 – February 1970 (David Bowie with Junior's Eyes)	David Bowie – vocals, guitar; Mick Wayne – guitar; Tim Renwick – guitar; John ‘Honk’ Lodge – bass guitar; John Cambridge – drums	David Bowie (1969); Bowie at the Beeb (2000) (tracks 5–6)
1970 (David Bowie)	David Bowie – vocals, guitar; Tony Visconti – bass guitar; Tex Johnson – congas (occasional shows)	
February – April 1970 (The Hype)	David Bowie – vocals, guitar, organ; Tony Visconti – bass guitar; Mick Ronson – guitar, vocals; John Cambridge – drums	Bowie at the Beeb (2000) (tracks 7–12)
April – November 1970 (The Hype)	David Bowie – vocals, guitar, organ; Tony Visconti – bass guitar; Mick Ronson – guitar, vocals; Benny Marshall – harmonica (occasional shows); Mick ‘Woody’ Woodmansey – drums; Mark Pritchett – guitar (occasional shows)	The Man Who Sold the World (1970)
November 1970 – (The Hype)	David Bowie – vocals, guitar, organ; Tony Visconti – bass guitar; Mick Ronson – guitar, vocals; Mick ‘Woody’ Woodmansey – drums; Benny Marshall – harmonica	
1971 (The Arnold Corns)	David Bowie – vocals, guitar; Mark Carr-Pritchett – guitar; Rudi Valentino (Freddie Burretti) – vocals (stand-in); Pete De Somogyl – bass guitar; Tim Broadbent – drums	
1971	David Bowie – vocals, guitar; Mark Carr-Pritchett – guitar, vocals; Mick Ronson – guitar, bass guitar; Herbie Flowers – bass guitar; Mick ‘Woody’ Woodmansey – drums	none – a line-up that was originally going to play on In Concert: John Peel
June 1971 (David Bowie and friends)	David Bowie – vocals, guitar; Mark Carr-Pritchett – guitar, vocals; Mick Ronson – guitar, bass guitar; Mick ‘Woody’ Woodmansey – drums; Trevor Bolder – bass guitar	Bowie at the Beeb (2000) (tracks 14–18)
1971 (David Bowie)	David Bowie – vocals, guitar, organ; Mick Ronson – guitar, bass guitar, vocals; Trevor Bolder – bass guitar; Mick ‘Woody’ Woodmansey – drums; Rick Wakeman – piano (one show); Tom Parker – piano (one show)	Hunky Dory (1971)
1972 (David Bowie and the Spiders from Mars Ziggy Stardust Tour)	David Bowie – vocals, guitar, saxophone; Mick Ronson – guitar, vocals; Trevor Bolder – bass guitar; Mick ‘Woody’ Woodmansey – drums	The Rise and Fall of Ziggy Stardust and the Spiders from Mars (1972); Bowie at the Beeb (2000)
June 1972 (David Bowie and the Spiders from Mars Ziggy Stardust Tour)	David Bowie – vocals, guitar, saxophone; Mick Ronson – guitar, vocals; Trevor Bolder – bass guitar; Mick ‘Woody’ Woodmansey – drums; Matthew Fisher – piano	
June – July 1972 (David Bowie and the Spiders From Mars Ziggy Stardust Tour)	David Bowie – vocals, guitar, saxophone; Mick Ronson – guitar, vocals; Trevor Bolder – bass guitar; Mick ‘Woody’ Woodmansey – drums; Robin Lumley – piano	
August – September 1972 (David Bowie and the Spiders From Mars Ziggy Stardust Tour + Sounds of the 70s: John Peel show)	David Bowie – vocals, guitar, saxophone; Mick Ronson – guitar, vocals; Trevor Bolder – bass guitar; Mick ‘Woody’ Woodmansey – drums; Nicky Graham – piano	Bowie at the Beeb (2000)
September – December 1972 (David Bowie and the Spiders From Mars Ziggy Stardust Tour)	David Bowie – vocals, guitar, saxophone; Mick Ronson – guitar, vocals; Trevor Bolder – bass guitar; Mick ‘Woody’ Woodmansey – drums; Mike Garson – piano	Santa Monica '72 (1994)
January – July 1973 (David Bowie and the Spiders From Mars Ziggy Stardust Tour)	David Bowie – vocals, guitar, saxophone, mime; Mick Ronson – lead guitar, vocals; Trevor Bolder – bass guitar; Mick ‘Woody’ Woodmansey – drums; Mike Garson – piano; John Hutchinson – rhythm guitar; Ken Fordham – saxophone; Brian Wilshaw – saxophone, flute; Geoffrey MacCormack – vocals, percussion	Aladdin Sane (1973)
October 1973 (The 1980 Floor Show)	David Bowie – vocals, guitar, saxophone; Mick Ronson – guitar; Trevor Bolder – bass guitar; Aynsley Dunbar – drums; Mark Pritchett – guitar; The Astronettes – Ava Cherry, Geoff MacCormack, Jason Guess – vocals	Pin Ups (1973)
January–February 1974 (Sessions)	David Bowie – vocals, guitar, saxophone, keyboards; Aynsley Dunbar – drums; Mike Garson – keyboards; Herbie Flowers – bass guitar; Tony Newman – drums; Alan Parker – guitar (one track)	Diamond Dogs (1974)
June–July 1974 (The Diamond Dogs Tour)	David Bowie – vocals; Mike Garson – piano, Mellotron; Gui Andrisano, Warren Peace (Geoff MacCormack) – backing vocals; Michael Kamen – electric piano, Moog synthesizer, oboe, musical director; Earl Slick – guitar; David Sanborn, Richard Grando – saxophone, flute; Herbie Flowers – bass guitar; Tony Newman – drums; Pablo Rosario – percussion	David Live (1974); Cracked Actor (Live Los Angeles '74) (2017)
September 1974 (The Diamond Dogs Tour)	David Bowie – vocals; Mike Garson – piano, Mellotron; Michael Kamen – electric piano, Moog, oboe; Earl Slick, Carlos Alomar – guitar; David Sanborn, Richard Grando – saxophone, flute; Doug Rauch – bass guitar; Greg Errico – drums; Pablo Rosario – percussion; Gui Andrisano, Warren Peace (Geoff MacCormack), Ava Cherry, Robin Clark, Anthony Hinton, Diane Sumler, Luther Vandross – backing vocals	I'm Only Dancing (The Soul Tour 74) (2020)
August–October 1974	David Bowie – vocals, guitar, keyboards; Mike Garson – piano; Earl Slick, Carlos Alomar – guitars; David Sanborn – saxophone; Willie Weeks – bass guitar; Andy Newmark – drums	Young Americans (1975)
October–December 1974 (The Soul Tour/Philly Dogs Tour)	David Bowie – vocals; Earl Slick, Carlos Alomar – guitar; Mike Garson – piano, Mellotron; David Sanborn – saxophone, flute; Pablo Rosario – percussion; Warren Peace (Geoff MacCormack), Ava Cherry, Robin Clark, Anthony Hinton, Diane Sumler, Luther Vandross – backing vocals; Emir Ksasan – bass guitar; Dennis Davis – drums	Young Americans (1975) two tracks
February – May 1976 (Isolar – 1976 Tour)	David Bowie – vocals, saxophone; Carlos Alomar – rhythm guitar, vocals; Dennis Davis – drums, percussion; Stacy Heydon – lead guitar: vocals; George Murray – bass guitar, vocals; Tony Kaye – keyboards	Station to Station (1976); Live Nassau Coliseum '76 (2017)
September–October 1976 (sessions)	David Bowie – vocals, saxophone, guitar, keyboards, Chamberlin; Carlos Alomar – rhythm and lead guitar; Dennis Davis – drums, percussion; George Murray – bass guitar; Brian Eno – keyboards, synthesizer, backing vocals; Ricky Gardiner – lead and rhythm guitar; Roy Young – piano, organ	Low (1977)
July–August 1977 (sessions)	David Bowie – vocals, keyboards, guitars, saxophone, koto, tambourine, backing vocals, producer; Carlos Alomar – rhythm guitar; Dennis Davis – drums, percussion; George Murray – bass guitar; Brian Eno – synthesisers, keyboards, guitar treatments; Robert Fripp – lead guitar; Tony Visconti – percussion, backing vocals, producer; Antonia Maass (Maaß) – backing vocals	"Heroes" (1977)
March – November 1978 (Isolar II – The 1978 World Tour)	David Bowie – vocals, Chamberlin; Carlos Alomar – rhythm guitar, vocals; George Murray – bass guitar, vocals; Dennis Davis – drums, percussion; Adrian Belew – lead guitar, vocals; Sean Mayes – piano, string ensemble, vocals; Roger Powell – keyboards, synthesizer, vocals; Simon House – electric violin, backing vocals	Stage (1978); Welcome to the Blackout (Live London '78) (2018)
November 1978 (Isolar II – The 1978 World Tour)	David Bowie – vocals, Chamberlin; Carlos Alomar – rhythm guitar, vocals; George Murray – bass guitar, vocals; Dennis Davis – drums, percussion; Adrian Belew – lead guitar, vocals; Sean Mayes – piano, string ensemble, vocals; Simon House – electric violin, backing vocals; Dennis Garcia – keyboards, synthesizer	
November – December 1978 (Isolar II – The 1978 World Tour)	David Bowie – vocals, Chamberlin; Carlos Alomar – rhythm guitar, vocals; George Murray – bass guitar, vocals; Dennis Davis – drums, percussion; Adrian Belew – lead guitar, vocals; Sean Mayes – piano, string ensemble, vocals; Simon House – electric violin, backing vocals; Roger Powell – keyboards, synthesizer, vocals	Lodger (1979)
February–April 1980 (sessions)	David Bowie – vocals, keyboards, saxophone; Carlos Alomar – lead and rhythm guitars; Dennis Davis – drums; George Murray – bass; Chuck Hammer – guitar synthesiser; Robert Fripp – guitar; Roy Bittan – piano; Andy Clark – synthesiser; Tony Visconti – acoustic guitar, backing vocals; Lynn Maitland – backing vocals; Chris Porter – backing vocals; Michi Hirota – voice	Scary Monsters (and Super Creeps) (1980)
December 1982 (sessions)	David Bowie – vocals; Nile Rodgers – guitar; Stevie Ray Vaughan – lead guitar; Carmine Rojas – bass guitar; Omar Hakim, Tony Thompson – drums; Sammy Figueroa – percussion; Robert Sabino – keyboards, piano; Stan Harrison – tenor saxophone, flute; Robert Aaron – tenor saxophone; Steve Elson – baritone saxophone, flute; Mac Gollehon – trumpet; Frank Simms, George Simms, David Spinner – backing vocals	Let's Dance (1983)
May – December 1983 (Serious Moonlight Tour)	David Bowie – vocals, guitar, saxophone; Carlos Alomar – guitar, vocals; Earl Slick – guitar; Dave Lebolt – keyboards, synthesizers; Steve Elson – saxophones; Stan Harrison, Lenny Pickett – saxophones, woodwinds; Carmine Rojas – bass guitar; Tony Thompson – drums, percussion; George Simms, Frank Simms – backing vocals	Serious Moonlight (Live '83) (1984)
May–June 1984 (Sessions)	David Bowie – vocals; Carlos Alomar – guitars; Carmine Rojas – bass guitar; Stanley Harrison – alto saxophone; tenor saxophone; Lenny Pickett – tenor saxophone; clarinet; Steve Elson – baritone saxophone; Derek Bramble – guitar, bass guitar, synthesizers, backing vocals; Omar Hakim – drums; Guy St. Onge – marimba; Sammy Figueroa – percussion; Robin Clark, George Simms, Curtis King – backing vocals; Arif Mardin – string arrangements; synthesisers; Mark Pender – flugelhorn; trumpet	Tonight (1984)
15 July 1985 (Live Aid – Wembley Stadium, London)	David Bowie – vocals; Kevin Armstrong – guitar, vocals; Thomas Dolby – keyboards, synthesisers; Clare Hirst – saxophone; Matthew Seligman – bass guitar; Neil Conti – drums; Pedro Ortiz – percussion; Tessa Niles, Helena Springs – vocals	
September–November 1986 (Session)	David Bowie – vocals, guitar, keyboards, harmonica, tambourine; Carlos Alomar – guitar, guitar synthesiser, tambourine, backing vocals; Carmine Rojas – bass guitar; Stan Harrison – alto saxophone; Steve Elson – baritone saxophone; Lenny Pickett – tenor saxophone; Erdal Kızılçay – keyboards, drums, bass guitar, trumpet, violins, backing vocals; Peter Frampton – lead guitar, sitar; Philippe Saisse – piano; Earl Gardner – flugelhorn; Laurie Frink – trumpet; Errol "Crusher" Bennett – percussion; Robin Clark – backing vocals; Lani Groves – backing vocals; Diva Gray – backing vocals; Gordon Grody – backing vocals	Never Let Me Down (1987)
May – November 1987 (Glass Spider Tour)	David Bowie – vocals, guitar; Carlos Alomar, Peter Frampton, Charlie Sexton: (Note: Guest performer during some North American/Australian shows) guitar, vocals; Carmine Rojas – bass guitar; Erdal Kızılçay – keyboards, trumpet, congas, violin, vocals; Richard Cottle – keyboards, saxophone, tambourine, vocals; Alan Childs – drums	
June – July 1989 (Tin Machine Tour)	David Bowie – vocals, guitar; Reeves Gabrels – lead guitar, vocals; Kevin Armstrong – rhythm guitar, vocals; Tony Sales – bass guitar, vocals; Hunt Sales – drums, vocals	Tin Machine (1989); Tin Machine II (1991)
March – September 1990 (Sound + Vision Tour)	David Bowie – vocals, guitar, saxophone; Adrian Belew – guitar, backing vocals; Erdal Kızılçay – bass guitar, backing vocals; Rick Fox – keyboards, backing vocals; Michael Hodges – drums	
October 1991 – February 1992 (Tin Machine: It's My Life Tour)	David Bowie – vocals, guitar, saxophone; Reeves Gabrels – lead guitar, vocals; Tony Sales – bass guitar, vocals; Hunt Sales – drums, vocals; Eric Schermerhorn – rhythm guitar, vocals	Tin Machine Live: Oy Vey, Baby (1992)
April–November 1992 (sessions)	David Bowie – vocals, guitar, saxophone, dog alto; Nile Rodgers – guitar; Poogie Bell, Sterling Campbell – drums; Barry Campbell, John Regan – bass; Richard Hilton, Dave Richards, Philippe Saisse, Richard Tee – keyboards; Michael Reisman – harp, tubular bells, string arrangement; Gerardo Velez – percussion; Fonzi Thornton, Tawatha Agee, Curtis King Jr., Dennis Collins, Brenda White-King, Maryl Epps – background vocals	Black Tie White Noise (1993)
August 1993	David Bowie – vocals, keyboards, synths, guitar, alto and baritone saxophones, keyboard percussion; Erdal Kızılçay – keyboards, trumpet, bass, guitar, drums, percussion	The Buddha of Suburbia (1993)
March–November 1994, January–February 1995	David Bowie – vocals, saxophone, guitar, keyboards; Erdal Kızılçay – bass, keyboards; Brian Eno – synthesisers, treatments; Reeves Gabrels – guitar; Mike Garson – grand piano; Sterling Campbell – drums; Carlos Alomar – rhythm guitar; Joey Baron – drums; Yossi Fine – bass	Outside (1995)
September 1995 – February 1996 (Outside Tour)	David Bowie – vocals; Reeves Gabrels – guitar; Carlos Alomar – guitar, backing vocals; Mike Garson – piano; Peter Schwartz – synthesizer; George Simms – backing vocals, keyboards; Gail Ann Dorsey – bass guitar, vocals; Zachary Alford – drums	ChangesNowBowie (2020); Ouvrez le Chien (Live Dallas 95) (2020)
June 1996 – November 1997 (Outside Summer Festivals Tour and Earthling Tour)	David Bowie – vocals; Reeves Gabrels – guitar, vocals; Mike Garson – keyboards, vocals; Gail Ann Dorsey – bass guitar, vocals; Zachary Alford – drums	Earthling (1997)
April–June 1999	David Bowie – vocals, drum programming, 12-string guitar, keyboards; Reeves Gabrels – drum programming, guitar, synthesiser programming; Mark Plati – bass guitar, acoustic and electric 12-string guitar, synth and drum programming; Mike Levesque – drums, percussion	Hours (1999)
October – December 1999 (Hours Tour)	David Bowie – vocals, acoustic guitar; Mike Garson – piano, keyboards; Gail Ann Dorsey – bass guitar, rhythm guitar, backing vocals; Page Hamilton – lead guitar; Mark Plati – rhythm guitar, bass guitar, backing vocals; Sterling Campbell – drums, percussion; Holly Palmer – backing vocals, percussion; Emm Gryner – backing vocals	Bowie at the Beeb (2000); VH1 Storytellers (2009); Something in the Air (Live Paris 99) (2020)
June 2000 (Mini Tour)	David Bowie – vocals, acoustic guitar, harmonica; Mike Garson – keyboards, piano; Gail Ann Dorsey – bass guitar, rhythm guitar, clarinet, vocals; Mark Plati – rhythm guitar, bass guitar, backing vocals; Sterling Campbell – drums, percussion; Holly Palmer – percussion, vocals; Emm Gryner – keyboard, clarinet, vocals; Earl Slick – lead guitar	Glastonbury 2000 (2018)
August 2001 – January 2002 (Sessions)	David Bowie – vocals, keyboards, guitars, saxophone, stylophone, drums; Tony Visconti – bass, guitars, recorders, string arrangements, backing vocals; Matt Chamberlain – drums, drum loop programming, percussion; David Torn – guitars, guitar loops, Omnichord	Heathen (2002)
June – October 2002 (Heathen Tour)	David Bowie – vocals, guitar, saxophone, harmonica, stylophone; Mike Garson – piano, keyboards; Gail Ann Dorsey – bass guitar, guitar, vocals; Mark Plati – guitar, bass guitar, keyboards, vocals; Sterling Campbell – drums, percussion; Earl Slick – guitar; Gerry Leonard – guitar, keyboards, vocals; Catherine Russell – keyboards, percussion, backing vocals	
January–May 2003 (Sessions)	David Bowie – vocals; guitar; keyboards; synthesiser; saxophone; Stylophone; percussion; harmonica; Mike Garson – piano; Gail Ann Dorsey – backing vocals; Mark Plati – bass guitar; guitar; Sterling Campbell – drums; Earl Slick – guitar; Gerry Leonard – guitar; Catherine Russell – backing vocals; David Torn – guitar; Tony Visconti – guitar; keyboards, bass guitar, backing vocals	Reality (2003)
October 2003 – June 2004 (A Reality Tour)	David Bowie – vocals, guitars, stylophone, harmonica; Gail Ann Dorsey – bass guitar, vocals; Mike Garson – piano, keyboards; Sterling Campbell – drums; Earl Slick – guitar; Gerry Leonard – guitar, backing vocals; Catherine Russell – keyboards, percussion, guitar, backing vocals	A Reality Tour (2010)

== Additional session musicians ==
Musicians that are either credited as additional personnel or contributed to fewer than 4 tracks on an album.

Image	Name	Years active	Instruments	Release contributions
	Jimmy Page	1965	lead guitar	"I Pity the Fool" (1965)
	Nicky Hopkins	1965	piano	"You've Got a Habit of Leaving" (1965)
	Shel Talmy	1965	backing vocals	"You've Got a Habit of Leaving" (1965)
	Leslie Conn	1965	backing vocals	"You've Got a Habit of Leaving" (1965)
	Glyn Johns	1965	backing vocals	"You've Got a Habit of Leaving" (1965)
	Tony Hatch	1965–1966	piano; backing vocals	"Can't Help Thinking About Me" (1966); "Do Anything You Say" (1966)
	Chick Norton	1966	trumpet	"Rubber Band" (1966)
	Gus Dudgeon	1967 (died 2002)	gnome vocal	"The Laughing Gnome" (1967)
	Peter Hampshire	1967	guitar	"The Laughing Gnome" (1967)
	John Renbourn	1967 (died 2015)	acoustic guitar	"Love You till Tuesday" (1967)
	Marion Constable	1966–1967	backing vocals	David Bowie (1967)
	Arthur Greenslade	1966–1967 (died 2003)	arrangements	David Bowie (1967)
	Andy White	1966–1968 (died 2015)	drums	The World of David Bowie (1970)
	Godfrey McLean	1970	drums	"The Prettiest Star" (1970)
	Ken Scott	1971	ARP synthesiser	Hunky Dory (1971)
	Alan Parker	1974	guitar	Diamond Dogs (1974)
	John Lennon	1974–1975 (died 1980)	vocals; guitar	Young Americans (1975)
	Ralph MacDonald	1974–1975 (died 2011)	percussion	Young Americans (1975)
	Larry Washington	1974–1975 (died 1999)	congas	Young Americans (1975)
	Jean Fineberg	1974–1975	backing vocals	Young Americans (1975)
	Jean Millington	1974–1975	backing vocals	Young Americans (1975)
	Harry Maslin	1975	melodica; synthesiser; vibraphone; baritone sax	Station to Station (1976)
	Iggy Pop	1976; 1984	backing vocals	Low (1977); Tonight (1984)
	Mary Visconti	1976	backing vocals	Low (1977)
	Eduard Meyer	1976	cellos	Low (1977)
	J. Peter Robinson	1976	pianos and ARP	Low (1977)
	Pete Townshend	1980; 2001–2002	guitar	Scary Monsters (and Super Creeps) (1980); Heathen (2002)
	Chuck Hammer	1980	guitar synthesiser	Scary Monsters (and Super Creeps) (1980)
	Michi Hirota	1980	voice	Scary Monsters (and Super Creeps) (1980)
	Mark King	1984	bass guitar	Tonight (1984)
	Rob Yale	1984	Fairlight CMI	Tonight (1984)
	Tina Turner	1984 (died 2023)	lead vocals	Tonight (1984)
	Mickey Rourke	1986	mid-song rap	Never Let Me Down (1987)
	Sid McGinnis	1986	lead guitar	Never Let Me Down (1987)
	Wild T. Springer	1992	lead guitar	Black Tie White Noise (1993)
	Al B. Sure!	1992	vocal duet	Black Tie White Noise (1993)
	Lester Bowie	1992 (died 1999)	trumpet	Black Tie White Noise (1993)
	Rob Clydesdale	1993	drums; bass; guitar	The Buddha of Suburbia (1993)
	Russell Powell	1993	drums; bass; guitar	The Buddha of Suburbia (1993)
	Gary Taylor	1993	drums; bass; guitar	The Buddha of Suburbia (1993)
	Isaac Daniel Prevost	1993		The Buddha of Suburbia (1993)
	Lenny Kravitz	guitar		
	Tom Frish	1994	additional guitar	Outside (1995)
	Bryony Edwards	1994	background vocals	Outside (1995)
	Lola Edwards	1994	background vocals	Outside (1995)
	Josey Edwards	1994	background vocals	Outside (1995)
	Ruby Edwards	1994	background vocals	Outside (1995)
	Everett Bradley	1999	percussion	Hours (1999)
	Chris Haskett	1999	rhythm guitar	Hours (1999)
	Marcus Salisbury	1999	bass guitar	Hours (1999)
	Lisa Germano	2000–2002	acoustic and electric violin; recorder; mandolin; accordion	Toy (2021); Heathen (2002)
	Cuong Vu	2000	trumpet	Toy (2021)
	Tony Levin	2001–2002; 2011–2012	bass guitar	Heathen (2002); The Next Day (2013)
	Greg Kitzis	2001–2002	first violin	Heathen (2002)
	Meg Okura	2001–2002	second violin	Heathen (2002)
	Martha Mooke	2001–2002	viola	Heathen (2002)
	Mary Wooten	2001–2002	cello	Heathen (2002)
	Jordan Rudess	2001–2002	keyboards	Heathen (2002)
	Kristeen Young	2001–2002	backing vocals; piano	Heathen (2002)
	Dave Grohl	2001–2002	guitar	Heathen (2002)
	Gary Miller	2001–2002	additional guitar	Heathen (2002)
	John Read	2001–2002	bass	Heathen (2002)
	Solá Ákingbolá	2001–2002	percussion	Heathen (2002)
	Philip Sheppard	2001–2002	electric cello	Heathen (2002)
	Mario J. McNulty	2003	additional percussion and drums	Reality (2003)
	Janice Pendarvis	2011–2012	backing vocals	The Next Day (2013)
	Henry Hey	2011–2012	piano	The Next Day (2013)
	Maxim Moston	2011–2012	strings	The Next Day (2013)
	Antoine Silverman	2011–2012	strings	The Next Day (2013)
	Anja Wood	2011–2012	strings	The Next Day (2013)
	Hiroko Taguchi	2011–2012	strings	The Next Day (2013)
	James Murphy	2015	percussion	Blackstar (2016)
	Erin Tonkon	2015	backing vocals	Blackstar (2016)
