= Too Much, Too Late =

2006 novel by Marc Spitz

- Author: Marc Spitz
- Language: English
- Subject: Music
- Publisher: Three Rivers Press
- Publication date: February 28, 2006
- Publication place: United States
- Media type: Print (paperback)
- Pages: 307
- ISBN: 978-1-4000-8293-3
- Preceded by: How Soon Is Never
- Followed by: We Got the Neutron Bomb: The Untold Story of LA Punk

Too Much, Too Late is novel written by Marc Spitz that was originally released on February 28, 2006 by Three Rivers Press.

== Synopsis ==
Reunited more than a decade after their brief flirtation with fame in the early 1990s, the middle-aged members of the Ohio-based Jane Ashers suddenly find themselves hitting the big time, with a new record deal, a hit single, fame, fans, and a tour, that transforms their dream into a nightmare of colliding egos, family pressures, and too much success too late.
