= We Got the Neutron Bomb =

2001 book by Marc Spitz and Brendan Mullen

We Got the Neutron Bomb: The Untold Story of L.A. Punk
- Author: Marc Spitz, Brendan Mullen
- Language: English
- Subject: Music
- Publisher: Three Rivers Press
- Publication date: November 13, 2001
- Publication place: United States
- Media type: Print (paperback)
- Pages: 296
- ISBN: 978-0-609-80774-3
- Preceded by: Too Much, Too Late
- Followed by: Nobody Likes You: Inside the Turbulent Life, Times and Music of Green Day

We Got the Neutron Bomb: The Untold Story of LA Punk is an oral history of the Los Angeles punk scene written by Marc Spitz and Brendan Mullen. It was released in 2001 by Three Rivers Press.

The story begins around 1971 with an exploration of the impact that the UK glam rock scene was having on American rock at the time, specifically through the efforts of promoter Rodney Bingenheimer to help sell David Bowie to the American public. There is then an examination of the impact of various bands that were contemporaneous at the time, including The Stooges and The New York Dolls before looking at the roles of bands and key figures that followed including The Screamers, Devo, X, Black Randy, Kim Fowley, Darby Crash, The Go-Go's, The Cramps, Black Flag, Los Lobos, Agent Orange and Social Distortion.

The book finishes around 1981 with the perceived 'selling out' of the LA punk scene, including The Go-Go's having their mainstream breakthrough on MTV, Penelope Spheeris' documentary The Decline of Western Civilization and the death of Darby Crash, foreshadowing in Greg Hetson's words "the dark years of punk" from 1984 to 1990.

== Reception ==
Punknews.org gave the book four and a half stars out of five. The Stranger called it "required reading" for those with "interest in L.A.'s budding pre-punk culture, or fringe-music culture in general."
