= I Dig Everything =

1966 single by David Bowie

- 2000 CD reissue

Single by David Bowie
- B-side: "I'm Not Losing Sleep"
- Released: 19 August 1966
- Recorded: 5 July 1966
- Studio: Pye, London
- Genre: Pop
- Length: 2:45
- Label: Pye
- Songwriter(s): David Bowie
- Producer(s): Tony Hatch

David Bowie singles chronology
"Do Anything You Say" (1966)	"I Dig Everything" (1966)	"Rubber Band" (1966)

"I Dig Everything" is a single by the English singer-songwriter David Bowie. It was his final single for Pye Records, released on 19 August 1966. The track was originally demoed with Bowie's then-band, the Buzz, but producer Tony Hatch was unhappy with their efforts and replaced them with session players. It is a pop song that musically and lyrically reflected the mid-1960s Swinging London era. The single was another commercial failure and resulted in the label dropping him. The original recording was included on the Early On (1964–1966) compilation in 1991.

Scottish trio 1-2-3 (later Clouds) performed the song during their live sets in the spring of 1967, becoming one of the first Bowie songs to be covered. After reviving the song live in 2000, Bowie re-recorded it in 2000 for the Toy project, which was initially shelved and released posthumously in 2021. The remake abandoned the original's production, becoming a guitar-driven rocker.

== Recording and style ==
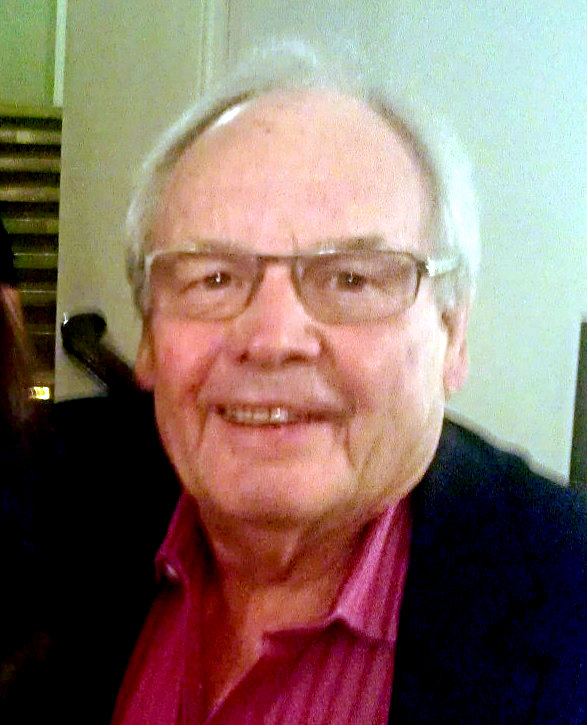
Tony Hatch in 2013, who produced the track.

David Bowie and his backing band the Buzz first attempted to record "I Dig Everything" on 6 June 1966 at Pye Studios in London. With Tony Hatch producing, after having produced Bowie's two previous singles, the session featured Dusty Springfield's backing vocalists Kiki Dee, Lesley Duncan and Madeline Bell and trumpeter Andy Kirk of Dave Antony's Moods. However, the band were under-rehearsed and Hatch deemed the session a failure. According to Buzz member John Eager, the Moods "were okay playing soul music but that's not what we wanted".

Although Bowie and the Buzz intended to rehearse further at R. G. Jones Studio, Hatch was unimpressed with the Buzz and instead hired numerous local studio musicians for the official Pye session on 5 July, having Bowie solely perform lead vocals. Hatch later said in 1990: "I frequently tried sessions with musicians recommended by singer/songwriters, often their own bands. Sometimes it worked and you could capture a natural raw quality." The session also produced the single's B-side, "I'm Not Losing Sleep".

Hatch centred the new take of "I Dig Everything" on Hammond organ, percussion and a flute countermelody in the second verse. The final take is lighthearted, leading James Perone to describe it as a "rock-inspired pop song" that exemplifies the style of 1960s Swinging London. Author Jon Savage compares it to the "burlesque sashay" of the contemporaneous song "Do You Come Here Often?" by English instrumental band the Tornados. The musical style supports the lyric which, in Nicholas Pegg's words, is "a cynical celebration of a layabout lifestyle on London's transient teen-scene". Perone states that Bowie would utilise similar characters as "I Dig Everything" in songs across his entire career. According to Chris O'Leary, Bowie struggled to sing several notes that are evident in the finished take. The arrangement is partially soul-influenced while the lyric emphasises Bowie's appreciation for American slang, which he would use prominently in later recordings. Authors Marc Spitz and Paul Trynka later compared the song's sound and style to the Austin Powers film series.

== Release ==
Four-prong centre variant of original 1966 UK single

Pye Records issued "I Dig Everything" in the United Kingdom on 19 August 1966, with the catalogue number Pye 7N 17157. Like his other singles, it failed to chart, resulting in his dismissal from Pye Records. Hatch later called his first single with Bowie, "Can't Help Thinking About Me", their best collaboration, stating that with each subsequent single, "we were getting further away from what we had [then], rough as it was." Hatch also acknowledged Bowie as a talented songwriter, saying, "I, particularly, recognised something special about Bowie. [...] I personally loved his take on London life and was very disappointed when we couldn't make others realise just how original he was." Although Bowie and the Buzz had appeared on the ATV programme Ready Steady Go! earlier in the year, the program rejected "I Dig Everything". They performed the new single later in the year, by which point Bowie had signed with Deram Records and began recording his first full-length album. The original recording later appeared on the compilation Early On (1964–1966) (1991).

In the spring of 1967, Scottish trio 1-2-3 (later Clouds) included "I Dig Everything" in their live performances, becoming one of the first Bowie songs to be covered. After he found out, Bowie befriended the band and later employed two members to play on some of his Ziggy-era demos. In Bowie: A Biography, Spitz calls the track "wonderful" and the best of Bowie's Hatch-produced singles. Reviewing the single retrospectively for AllMusic, Ned Raggett called the song an "enjoyable enough romp" that has "just enough fun and bite to connect in equal measure". In a 2016 list ranking every Bowie single from worst to best, Ultimate Classic Rock placed "I Dig Everything" at number 106 (out of 119).

== Toy version ==
"I Dig Everything"

Song by David Bowie

from the album Toy
- Released: 26 November 2021
- Recorded: July–October 2000
- Studio: Sear Sound and Looking Glass (New York City)
- Length: 5:03
- Label: ISO/Parlophone
- Songwriter(s): David Bowie
- Producer(s): David Bowie, Mark Plati

Bowie unexpectedly revived "I Dig Everything" during his summer 2000 tour. Shortly after, he re-recorded the song during the sessions for the Toy project between July and October 2000, along with other tracks he wrote and recorded during the mid-1960s, including his other Pye single "Can't Help Thinking About Me". The lineup consisted of members of Bowie's then-touring band: guitarist Earl Slick, bassist Gail Ann Dorsey, pianist Mike Garson, musician Mark Plati and drummer Sterling Campbell, along with instrumentalist Lisa Germano on violin and backing vocalists Holly Palmer and Emm Gryner. Co-produced by Bowie and Plati, the band rehearsed the songs at Sear Sound Studios in New York City before recording them as live tracks. Plati stated that he refused to listen to Bowie's original recordings of the tracks, so to prevent the originals from influencing his playing on the new versions. Overdubs were recorded at New York's Looking Glass Studios.

Toy was initially intended for release in March 2001, before it was shelved by EMI/Virgin due to financial issues. Bowie departed the label and recorded his next album Heathen (2002). In March 2011, tracks from the Toy sessions, including "I Dig Everything", were leaked online, attracting media attention. With a length of 4:52, the leaked version displayed a slower tempo and ditched the Swinging London-style for a more guitar-led arrangement.

Ten years later, on 29 September 2021, Warner Music Group announced that Toy would get an official release on 26 November as part of the box set Brilliant Adventure (1992–2001) through ISO and Parlophone. A separate deluxe edition, titled Toy:Box, was released on 7 January 2022, which contains two new mixes of the song: an "alternative mix" and an "Unplugged and Somewhat Slightly Electric" mix, featuring new guitar parts by Plati and Slick.

The Evening Standard's David Smyth writes that, similar to the leaked version, the official release abandons Hatch's original production to become a "stomping rocker". Helen Brown of The Independent also stated that "the once wannabe-jaunty" original is morphed into "a blast of grungy fun", further noting the difference in Bowie's vocal performance. Meanwhile, Rolling Stone's Brenna Ehrlich found the remake harkened back to Bowie's cover of Them's "Here Comes the Night" from Pin Ups (1973). Reviewing Toy, Pitchfork's Sean T. Collins praised the performances of the band but felt they hurt the material more than help it, particularly on "I Dig Everything", which went from a "Swinging London, proto-reggae sound" to a "preening rocker".

== Personnel ==
According to Chris O'Leary:

Original version

- David Bowie – lead vocal
- Unknown musicians – lead guitar, Hammond organ, flute, bass, drums, conga, guiro, backing vocals
- Tony Hatch – producer

Toy version

- David Bowie – vocals, producer
- Earl Slick – lead guitar
- Gerry Leonard – rhythm guitar
- Gail Ann Dorsey – bass, backing vocals
- Mike Garson – keyboards
- Mark Plati – bass, rhythm guitar, producer
- Sterling Campbell – drums
- Holly Palmer – backing vocals
- Emm Gryner – backing vocals
