= An Oral/Visual History by the Red Hot Chili Peppers =

Book written by the Red Hot Chili Peppers with Brendan Mullen

- Cover photo of the book
- Author: Red Hot Chili Peppers, Brendan Mullen
- Language: English
- Subject: Red Hot Chili Peppers
- Genre: Memoir
- Publisher: ItBooks
- Publication date: October 19, 2010
- Media type: Hardcover; Paperback; E-book
- Pages: 245
- ISBN: 9780061351914

An Oral/Visual History by the Red Hot Chili Peppers is a book written by the Red Hot Chili Peppers along with Brendan Mullen. It was released as a hardcover coffee-table book.

== Background ==
The book is a biographical account of the band from 1983 until the 2000s. It features previously unpublished photographs.

The book contains interviews with many of the then present and past band members, friends, family and others discussing the band's legacy. The book contains hundreds of photographs and images. It was one of the final projects the band worked on with guitarist John Frusciante before he quit the band in 2009 and concludes with a write-up by lead singer Anthony Kiedis on the guitarist, his departure and the band's future. Brendan Mullen, a Los Angeles club promoter and the man who gave the band their start, died during the writing of the book, leaving others to complete the project.
