= Marc Spitz =

American music journalist (1969–2017)

- Born: October 2, 1969; Far Rockaway, Queens, New York City, U.S.
- Died: February 4, 2017 (aged 47); New York City, U.S.
- Education: Bennington College
- Occupations: Author; music journalist; playwright
- Writing career
- Genres: Music; pop culture

Marc Spitz (October 2, 1969 – February 4, 2017) was an American music journalist, writer and playwright. Spitz's writings on rock and roll and popular culture appeared in Spin (where he was a Senior Writer) as well as The New York Times, Maxim, Blender, Harp, Nylon and the New York Post. He was a contributing music writer for Vanity Fair.

== Biography ==
Born in Far Rockaway, Queens, Spitz was the author of the novels How Soon Is Never and Too Much, Too Late, and the biographies We Got the Neutron Bomb: The Untold Story of LA Punk (with Brendan Mullen), Nobody Likes You: Inside the Turbulent Life, Times and Music of Green Day, Bowie: A Biography, and Jagger: Rebel, Rock Star, Rambler, Rogue. He appears in the anthologies The Encyclopedia of Ex-es, Howl: A Collection of the Best Contemporary Dog Wit, and Rock N’ Roll Cage Match: Music’s Greatest Rivalries Decided. His books have been translated and published in French, Danish, German, and Dutch.

Spitz was a "Downtown" playwright, emerging from the Ludlow Street scene around Todo con Nada in 1998. His other theatrical work includes Retail Sluts, The Rise and Fall of the Farewell Drugs, ...Worry, Baby, The Hobo Got Too High, I Wanna Be Adored, Shyness Is Nice, Gravity Always Wins, The Name of This Play is Talking Heads, Your Face Is A Mess, A Marshmallow World, Up For Anything, and P.S. It's Poison. Shyness Is Nice was selected and anthologized as one of NY Theatre's Best Plays of 2001, and its opening monologue appears in the Applause anthology One on One: Best Men’s Monologues of the 21st Century, published in October, 2008.

Spitz spoke at Columbia University (on playwrighting) and DePaul University (on journalism), and appeared as a "talking head" on MTV, VH1, MSNBC.

Spitz died in New York City in February 2017, at the age of 47. No information was released about the cause of his death.

== Books ==
=== Novels ===
- How Soon Is Never?. Broadway Books. 2003. ISBN 978-0609810408.
- Too Much, Too Late. Broadway Books. 2006. ISBN 978-1400082933.

=== Nonfiction ===
- Spitz, Marc; Mullen, Brendan (2001). We Got the Neutron Bomb: The Untold Story of L.A. Punk. Three Rivers Press. ISBN 978-0609807743.
- Nobody Likes You: Inside the Turbulent Life, Times and Music of Green Day. Hachette Books. 2006. ISBN 978-1401309121.
- Bowie: A Biography. Three Rivers Press. 2009. ISBN 978-0307716996.
- Jagger: Rebel, Rock Star, Rambler, Rogue. Avery. 2011. ISBN 978-1592407347.
- Poseur: A Memoir of Downtown New York City in the '90s. Da Capo Press. 2013. ISBN 978-0306821745.
- Twee: The Gentle Revolution in Music, Books, Television, Fashion, and Film. It Books. 2014. ISBN 978-0062213044.

== Plays ==
- Retail Sluts
- The Rise and Fall of the Farewell Drugs
- "…Worry, Baby"
- The Hobo Got Too High
- I Wanna Be Adored
- Shyness Is Nice
- Gravity Always Wins
- The Name of This Play is Talking Heads
- Your Face Is A Mess
- A Marshmallow World
- Up For Anything
- P.S. It's Poison
- Revenge and Guilt
