= Brendan Mullen =

Nightclub owner, music promoter and writer

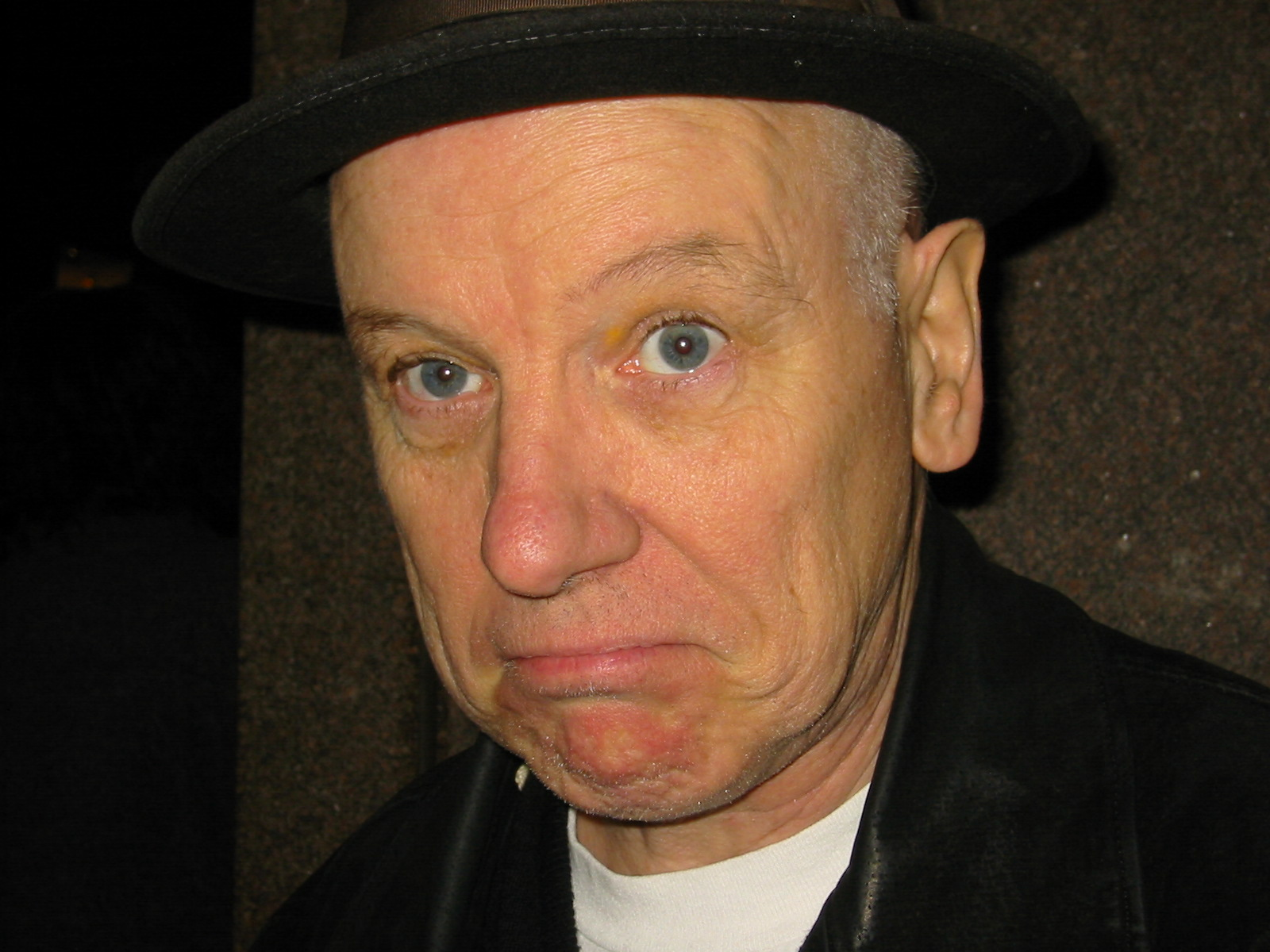
- Mullen in 2003
- Born: October 9, 1949; Paisley, Scotland
- Died: October 12, 2009 (aged 60); Los Angeles, California, US
- Occupations: Nightclub owner, author
- Known for: The Masque, Club Lingerie

Brendan Mullen (October 9, 1949 – October 12, 2009) was a Scottish nightclub owner, music promoter and writer, best known for founding the Los Angeles punk rock club The Masque. Through Mullen's support at various nightclubs in California, the scene gave birth to such bands as the Red Hot Chili Peppers, The Go-Go's, X, The Weirdos and the Germs.

== Early life ==
Mullen was born in Paisley, Scotland, and moved to Stockport near Manchester, England, when he was eight years old. He spent his early teen years writing for various British music magazines. He also worked as a local newspaper journalist at the Barnet Press in the London Borough of Barnet from 1972 to 1973.

== Move to the United States ==
In 1973, Mullen moved to the United States, where he resided for the remainder of his life. His family, father, mother, sister and brother remained in the Stockport area.

Brendan maintained close links with his family periodically visiting his old home town of Stockport. On one occasion in the early 1990s a visit to The Boardwalk club in Manchester and meeting by chance the band's manager, resulted in British indie group The Railway Children playing a gig in Brendan's New York Club.

== The Masque ==
In 1977, Mullen founded The Masque, a small punk rock club in central Hollywood, California, which existed intermittently from 1977 to 1979. Mullen originally only wanted a place to practice music; however the owner of the building offered him the 10,000-square-foot (930 m^{2}) basement for $850 a month allowing him to set up numerous rehearsal spaces for the burgeoning punk music community. City officials refused to approve permits required to run it as a legal nightclub and shut the club down in 1978. Fire marshals sued Mullen to end the lease and many bands came to his aid with two nights of benefit concerts to raise money to pay legal fees. Both shows culminated in rioting.

== Club Lingerie and others ==
After the closure of The Masque, Mullen spent much of the next decade booking shows for another popular L.A. club called Club Lingerie. Club Lingerie was known more for its eclectic bookings that ran from punk and pop to jazz and blues, as well as the first West Coast appearances by several New York-based hip-hop acts. In 1983, Mullen had his first encounter with Anthony Kiedis and Flea, who came into the club with their newly recorded demo tape, demanding Mullen listen to it. The duo proceeded to play the demo on a boombox they carried around and danced around like maniacs to their music. The music impressed Mullen, as did the duo's energy. He offered their band, the Red Hot Chili Peppers, an opening slot on an upcoming Bad Brains show. Kiedis and Flea ended up becoming longtime friends with Mullen until his death. The band credits Mullen with being one of their first major supporters and giving them their start. Mullen also booked a wider range of performances at the Variety Arts Center downtown in the mid-to-late '80s. Mullen would later work for other clubs in the area such as The Viper Room and Luna Park.

== Death ==
On October 12, 2009, the website Media Bistro reported that Mullen had been rushed to a Los Angeles hospital, having suffered a serious stroke. The Los Angeles Times confirmed his death at the Ventura County Medical Center shortly thereafter. At the time of his stroke, Mullen was celebrating his 60th birthday by traveling through Santa Barbara and Ventura with Kateri Butler, his companion of 16 years. Doctors were surprised by his stroke saying he had none of the indicators, his cholesterol was perfect. One of the neurologists who treated Mullen stated, 'Sometimes, your number is just up.' Red Hot Chili Peppers bassist Flea wrote a two-page article for the Los Angeles Times on the passing of Mullen.

Mullen had just started working toward U.S. citizenship at the time of his death. One of his last projects, which he was unable to complete before his death, was helping the Red Hot Chili Peppers co-author their autobiography, An Oral/Visual History by the Red Hot Chili Peppers. The book was published on October 19, 2010, a little over a year after Mullen's death.

== In popular culture ==
The Red Hot Chili Peppers' 2011 album, I'm With You features the song "Brendan's Death Song", a tribute to Mullen. According to Anthony Kiedis, he was told about Mullen's death on the first day of rehearsals for the album. He went to rehearsals and informed the band of Mullen's death and without talking, the band quickly started to play music and the song came to the band quickly out of a jam. Kiedis described the song as having the feel of a death march but "it's more of a celebration than a bummer." On March 7, 2012, the Chili Peppers announced that "Brendan's Death Song" would be released as the fifth single from their album although the song was rarely performed on the band's I'm with You World Tour and would film the music video for the song in New Orleans. The concept of the video is a jazz funeral.

== Selected bibliography ==
- We Got the Neutron Bomb: The Untold Story of LA Punk (2001) with Marc Spitz
- Lexicon Devil: The Fast Times and Short Life of Darby Crash and the Germs (2002) coauthored with Germs drummer Don Bolles and Adam Parfrey
- Whores: An Oral Biography of Perry Farrell and Jane's Addiction (2006)
- Live at the Masque: Nightmare in Punk Alley (2007) with Roger Gastman, and Kristine McKenna
- The Red Hot Chili Peppers: An Oral/Visual History (2010) - coauthored by the Red Hot Chili Peppers and Mullen

== Selected filmography ==
- The Decline of Western Civilization (1981) himself
- X: The Unheard Music (1986) himself
- We Jam Econo (2005) himself
- Punk's Not Dead (2007) himself
- Who Is Billy Bones? (2015) himself (archive footage)
