= Jagger: Rebel, Rock Star, Rambler, Rogue =

2011 book by Marc Spitz

- Author: Marc Spitz
- Language: English
- Subject: Biographies & Memoirs, Music
- Publisher: Gotham Books
- Publication date: September 8, 2011
- Publication place: United States
- Media type: Print (Hardcover)
- Pages: 320
- ISBN: 978-1-59240-655-5
- Preceded by: BOWIE: A Biography

Jagger: Rebel, Rock Star, Rambler, Rogue is a biography and cultural examination of The Rolling Stones' frontman Mick Jagger's life and the cultural revolution he led. The book was written by Marc Spitz and originally released on September 8, 2011, by Gotham Books.

== Release ==
Jagger: Rebel, Rock Star, Rambler, Rogue was first published in the United States in hardback and e-book format on September 8, 2011, through Gotham Books. The book was given a release in German and Swedish through Hambel Edel Books and Bokförlaget NoNa the following year, respectively.

== Reception ==
Janet Maslin, writing for The New York Times, reviewed the book negatively, calling it an "eager hagiography" of Jagger that was written in response to Life, a memoir by Keith Richards.
