= Early On (1964–1966) =

Compilation album by David Bowie
- Released: January 17, 1991
- Recorded: 1964–1966
- Genre: Pop
- Length: 41:51
- Label: Rhino

David Bowie chronology
Changesbowie (1990)	Early On (1964–1966) (1991)	Black Tie White Noise (1993)

David Bowie compilation chronology
Changesbowie (1990)	Early On (1964–1966) (1991)	The Singles Collection (1993)

Professional ratings
Review scores
Source	Rating
AllMusic	3/5 stars
Spin Alternative Record Guide	2/10

Early On (1964–1966) is a compilation album by David Bowie, released in 1991. It is notable as the first and only attempt to compile a comprehensive collection of all of Bowie's pre-Deram material and encompasses multiple labels including Vocalion, Parlophone, and Pye. Tracks three and four are alternate versions to the official singles, while "Do Anything You Say" is also a different mix from the normal single. There are also five unreleased songs included that came from Shel Talmy's collection. Talmy produced Bowie's second and third single. A cassette version was released; however this omitted "Liza Jane", "Louie, Louie Go Home", and "Good Morning Girl".

== Background ==
Bowie began his recording career as Davie Jones, a variation of his birth name, David Robert Jones. His first single (tracks 1–2) was recorded with The King Bees. The B-side was also released by Paul Revere and the Raiders as "Louie, Go Home" in 1964.

Bowie switched to The Manish Boys for his second single (tracks 3–4). In February 1965, he switched again to The Lower Third (tracks 5–13). For his third single, he also changed his name to Davy Jones. To avoid confusion with The Monkees band member, he adopted the name David Bowie before his fourth single.

A financial dispute ended his relationship with The Lower Third on 28 January 1966. For his fifth single (tracks 14–15), he teamed up with The Buzz, who were uncredited on the release. Dissatisfied with the band's performance on tour, they were replaced with session musicians on Bowie's sixth single (tracks 16–17).

== Track listing ==
All tracks are written by David Bowie, except "Liza Jane" by Leslie Conn, "Louie, Louie Go Home" by Mark Lindsay and Paul Revere, "I Pity the Fool" by Deadric Malone.

No.	Title	Origin	Length
1.	"Liza Jane"	recorded May 1964; A-side single released 5 June 1964	2:18
2.	"Louie, Louie Go Home"	B-side single released 5 June 1964	2:12
3.	"I Pity the Fool"	recorded 15 January 1965; A-side single released 5 March 1965	2:09
4.	"Take My Tip"	B-side single released 5 March 1965	2:15
5.	"That's Where My Heart Is"	demo recorded May–July 1965	2:28
6.	"I Want My Baby Back"	demo recorded May–July 1965	2:39
7.	"Bars of the County Jail"	demo recorded May–July 1965	2:07
8.	"You've Got a Habit of Leaving"	recorded July 1965; A-side single released 20 August 1965	2:31
9.	"Baby Loves That Way"	B-side single released 20 August 1965	3:02
10.	"I'll Follow You"	recorded June–July 1965	2:02
11.	"Glad I've Got Nobody"	recorded June–July 1965	2:31
12.	"Can't Help Thinking About Me"	recorded 10 December 1965; A-side single released 14 January 1966	2:47
13.	"And I Say to Myself"	recorded December 1965; B-side single released 14 January 1966	2:29
14.	"Do Anything You Say"	recorded 7 March 1966; A-side single released 1 April 1966	2:31
15.	"Good Morning Girl"	recorded March 1966; B-side single released 1 April 1966	2:14
16.	"I Dig Everything"	recorded 5 July 1966; A-side single released August 1966	2:44
17.	"I'm Not Losing Sleep"	B-side single released August 1966	2:52

Record labels: Vocalion Pop (tracks 1–2); Parlophone (tracks 3–4, 8–9); Pye Records (tracks 12–17).
