= Can't Help Thinking About Me =

1966 song by David Bowie

Single by David Bowie with the Lower Third
- B-side: "And I Say to Myself"
- Released: 14 January 1966
- Recorded: 10 December 1965
- Studio: Marble Arch, London
- Genre: Mod, folk-pop
- Length: 2:47
- Label: Pye (UK); Warner Bros. (US)
- Songwriter: David Bowie
- Producer: Tony Hatch

David Bowie singles chronology
"You've Got a Habit of Leaving" (1965)	"Can't Help Thinking About Me" (1966)	"Do Anything You Say" (1966)

"Can't Help Thinking About Me" is a song written by the English musician David Bowie and recorded with his band the Lower Third. Released as a single by Pye Records on 14 January 1966, it was the first one issued under the "David Bowie" name after previously performing as Davy Jones or Davie Jones. The recording was produced by Tony Hatch, who also contributed piano. The session took place on 10 December 1965 at Marble Arch Studios in London. A rewrite of Bowie's "The London Boys", the song concerns a boy found guilty of an act that decides to leave town to start anew. It is noted by biographers as showcasing Bowie's growth as a songwriter, displaying themes he would utilise in his later work. Musically, the song explores the contemporary mod sound of the Who and the Kinks.

"Can't Help Thinking About Me" flopped as a single like Bowie's previous releases, but peaked at number 34 on the Melody Maker chart after chart-rigging by Ralph Horton. Disputes with Horton led to Bowie's departure from the Lower Third two weeks after its release. In March 1966, Bowie performed the song on the ATV programme Ready Steady Go! with the Buzz. Two months later, it was issued in the United States by Warner Bros. Records, becoming Bowie's first US release. The original recording later appeared on the compilation albums Early On (1964–1966) (1991) and Nothing Has Changed (2014).

Over thirty years after its initial release, Bowie revived "Can't Help Thinking About Me" during his 1999 Hours Tour. He then re-recorded the song during the sessions for Toy in mid-2000, along with other tracks he wrote and recorded during the mid-1960s. After the project was shelved, the remake remained unreleased until 2021, when Toy was officially issued as part of the Brilliant Adventure (1992–2001) box set. A previously unseen live performance of the song from October 1999 accompanied the release on 19 November 2021.

== Writing and recording ==
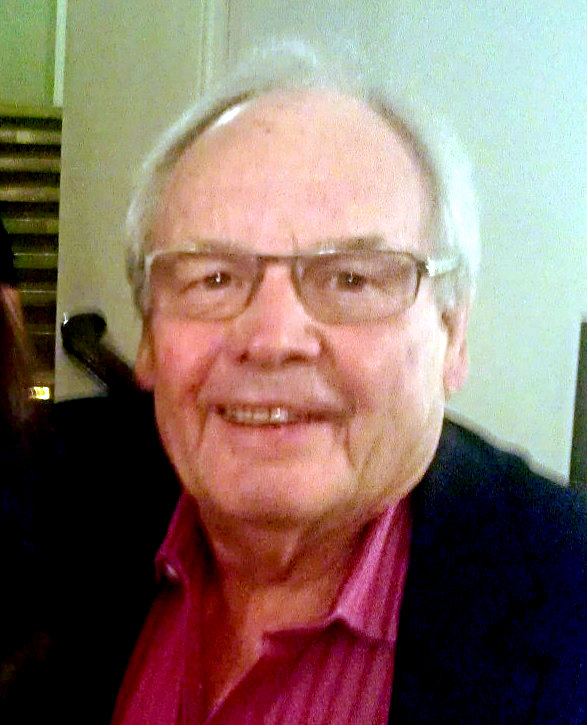
Tony Hatch in 2013, who produced the track and played piano.

By 1965, David Bowie, who was still performing as Davy Jones or Davie Jones at the time, had released a string of singles with numerous bands that failed to garner commercial success. As such, EMI dropped him from the label. His new manager, Ralph Horton, contacted publicist Kenneth Pitt for financial backing and an established partner. At the suggestion of Pitt, Jones changed his name to Bowie to distinguish himself from the singer and actor Davy Jones, who later became one of the Monkees. On the lookout for a label, Horton convinced Tony Hatch, an A&R employee for Pye Records, to sign Bowie. Hatch, who produced and composed songs for other artists at the time, signed him on the grounds that Bowie wrote his own songs. After Pye rejected his recently demoed composition "The London Boys" on the grounds of provocative lyrical content, Bowie rewrote it as "Can't Help Thinking About Me". Hatch later told biographer Paul Trynka: "I remember 'The London Boys'. There were a lot of songs about his background. There was one about the Hackney Marshes which is probably in some archive somewhere."

At the time of recording, Bowie was the leader of the Lower Third, having joined them after leaving the Manish Boys. With Hatch producing and on piano, Bowie and the Lower Third recorded "Can't Help Thinking About Me" on 10 December 1965 at Marble Arch Studios in London. The lineup consisted of Bowie, guitarist Dennis Taylor, bassist Graham Rivens and drummer Phil Lancaster. According to biographer Nicholas Pegg, Hatch berated the band's backing vocals as sounding "like a Saturday night at the old Bull and Bush". Regarding Bowie, Hatch later stated: "[David was] good to get on with and excellent in the studio. His material was good, although I thought he wrote too much about London dustbins. Those were his formative years and he hadn't reached maturity, but he was unusual, unique."

After the session, Bowie and the Lower Third conducted numerous live performances into January 1966. However, Horton showed instances of favouritism for Bowie over the band, including an instance where he announced Bowie would accompany him on a flight home from France while the remaining members find their own way. These disputes and additional financial issues between Horton and them caused rising tensions. According to Taylor: "He took a liking to David definitely and from that point, it was no longer a singer and a group, it had become a singer with a group, which is a different thing altogether."

== Composition and lyrics ==
Several of the younger teenagers' programmes wouldn't play 'Can't Help Thinking About Me', because it is about leaving home. The number relates several incidents in every teenager's life – and leaving home is something which always comes up.

—David Bowie, Melody Maker, February 1966

Musically, author James E. Perone states that the song explores the contemporary mod sound of the Who and the Kinks, while in subsequent decades, PopMatters described it as folk-pop. Perone further argues that the song established Bowie "as a composer who is able to assimilate a prevailing musical style".

Bowie's biographers note that "Can't Help Thinking About Me" showcases the artist's growth as a songwriter, displaying themes Bowie would utilise in his later work. The song concerns a boy found guilty of an act who decides to leave town to start anew, establishing a reoccurring theme in the artist's lyrics that portray outcasts and outsiders. AllMusic's Richie Unterberger later stated that "'Can't Help Thinking About Me' is an uneasily introspective number that foreshadows his later lyrics". Pegg specifically writes that "the motif of lonely travelling as a metaphor for the creative quest" would reappear in "Black Country Rock" (1970), "Be My Wife" (1977) and "Move On" (1979).

According to Chris O'Leary, the lyric "My girl calls my name 'Hi Dave', drop-in, come back, see you around if you're this way again" was the result of Bowie forgetting to bring his lyric book to the studio, which forced himself to recall the lyrics from memory. With the line, "Can't Help Thinking About Me" is one of only three songs in which Bowie says his own name, the others being "Teenage Wildlife" (1980) and his cover of the Pixies' "Cactus" (2002). Bowie himself later referred to the track's title as "an illuminating little piece".

== Release ==
On 6 January 1966, Bowie's sponsor Raymond Cook financed a launch party for the single, which was held at the Victoria in Strathearn Place. The press mostly centred on Bowie while the Lower Third were ignored, which contributed to rising tensions in the band that culminated in Bowie's departure two weeks after the single's release on 29 January. A review for Record Retailer described the upcoming single as an "original song about teenage trouble. Words worth listening to but arrangement not all that original."

Pye issued "Can't Help Thinking About Me" in the United Kingdom on 14 January 1966, with the catalogue number Pye 7N17020. Credited to David Bowie with the Lower Third, it was his first release under the "David Bowie" name. The B-side was "And I Say to Myself", another Bowie-penned track that was recorded around the same time. Commercially, the single flopped like its predecessors. Using £250 borrowed from Cook, Horton made attempts at chart rigging, pushing the single to number 34 on the Melody Maker chart. Hatch recalled the top 40 placement made Bowie "very excited" as for himself: I did see David as a long-term artist. And I knew we had a lot more material to play with."

On 4 March 1966, Bowie and his new band the Buzz appeared on ATV programme Ready Steady Go!, where they mimed to "Can't Help Thinking About Me" over a pre-recorded backing track. Bowie sang live vocals and wore a white suit designed by mod trendsetter John Stephen, which Pegg writes resulted in a huge glare for the cameras. In May 1966, "Can't Help Thinking About Me" was issued as a single in the United States by Warner Bros. Records, becoming Bowie's first US release. Like the original UK release, the single flopped. The song appeared on the Pye compilation Hitmakers Volume 4 later that year, which marked the first time a Bowie recording appeared on an album. He released two more singles for Pye, "Do Anything You Say" and "I Dig Everything", before signing with Deram Records in late 1966.

"Can't Help Thinking About Me" later appeared on the compilation albums Early On (1964–1966) (1991) and Nothing Has Changed (2014). Regarding the song, O'Leary calls it Bowie's "strongest" song up to that point, writing its failure had "ill consequences" on the artist, including a loss of confidence and to "chase after whims". In a 2016 list ranking every Bowie single from worst to best, Ultimate Classic Rock placed "Can't Help Thinking About Me" at number 110 (out of 119).

== Live performances ==
Over 30 years after its original release, Bowie sang "Can't Help Thinking About Me" at a 1997 gig in San Francisco before resurrecting the full song and regular performances on the Hours Tour in 1999. It marked the first time since 1970 Bowie had performed any of his pre-Space Oddity (1969) material. First performing the song during his appearance on VH1's Storytellers programme, he called the song a "beautiful piece of solipsism" but proclaimed the "Hi Dave" lines as among the worst he ever wrote. The appearance later saw release as VH1 Storytellers in 2009. Further live recordings during the tour were released in 2020 and 2021 on Something in the Air (Live Paris 99) and David Bowie at the Kit Kat Klub (Live New York 99), respectively, as part of the Brilliant Live Adventures series (2020–2021).

== Toy version ==
"Can't Help Thinking About Me"

Song by David Bowie

from the album Toy
- Released: 19 November 2021
- Recorded: July–October 2000
- Studio: Sear Sound and Looking Glass, New York City
- Length: 3:25
- Label: ISO; Parlophone
- Songwriter: David Bowie
- Producers: David Bowie, Mark Plati

After performing the song live in 1999, Bowie re-recorded "Can't Help Thinking About Me" during the sessions for the Toy project between July and October 2000, along with other tracks Bowie wrote and recorded in the mid-1960s, including "The London Boys" and "You've Got a Habit of Leaving". The lineup consisted of the members of Bowie's then-touring band: guitarist Earl Slick, bassist Gail Ann Dorsey, pianist Mike Garson, musician Mark Plati and drummer Sterling Campbell. With co-production from Bowie and Plati, the band rehearsed the songs at Sear Sound Studios in New York City before recording them as live tracks. Plati stated that he refused to listen to Bowie's original recordings of the tracks, so to prevent the originals from influencing his playing on the new versions. Overdubs were recorded at New York's Looking Glass Studios.

Toy was initially intended for release in March 2001, before it was shelved by EMI/Virgin due to financial issues. So, Bowie departed the label and recorded his next album Heathen (2002). In March 2011, tracks from the Toy sessions, excluding "Can't Help Thinking About Me" and "Karma Man", were leaked online, attracting media attention. Ten years later, on 29 September 2021, Warner Music Group announced that Toy would get an official release on 26 November as part of the box set Brilliant Adventure (1992–2001) through ISO and Parlophone. "Can't Help Thinking About Me" was premiered ahead of the box set's release on 19 November. Accompanying the release was a previously unseen live performance from October 1999 at London's Maida Vale Studios for the Mark Radcliffe BBC Radio 1 Show; this recording served as the B-side for the single. Radcliffe said in a statement:

I'm so pleased that this track is being released as it was such a joy and surprise when he included it in his set at Maida Vale that day. [...] David was wearing an excellent shirt and was on such great, twinkly form. I recall David dancing with Gail Ann Dorsey to 'I Try' by Macy Gray, which was playing on the radio. [...] It was one of the few cherished and special days I got to spend with him for which I remain ever grateful.

A separate deluxe edition, titled Toy:Box, was released on 7 January 2022, which contains two new mixes of the song: an "alternative mix" and an "Unplugged and Somewhat Slightly Electric" mix, featuring new guitar parts by Plati and Slick. Reviewing Toy, Alexis Petridis of The Guardian praised Bowie's performance on "Can't Help Thinking About Me", stating "Bowie is clearly having a high old time roaring through his old freakbeat single".

== Personnel ==
According to Chris O'Leary:

Original version

- David Bowie – vocals
- Dennis Taylor – 12-string acoustic guitar, lead guitar, backing vocals
- Graham Rivens – bass, backing vocals
- Phil Lancaster – drums, backing vocals
- Tony Hatch – piano, background vocals, producer

Toy version

- David Bowie – vocals, producer
- Earl Slick – lead guitar
- Gerry Leonard – rhythm guitar
- Gail Ann Dorsey – bass, backing vocals
- Mike Garson – keyboards
- Mark Plati – rhythm guitar, producer
- Sterling Campbell – drums
- Holly Palmer – backing vocals
- Emm Gryner – backing vocals
