= Bowie: A Biography =

2009 book by Marc Spitz

- Author: Marc Spitz
- Language: English
- Subject: Biographies and memoirs, music
- Publisher: Crown Publishing Group
- Publication date: October 27, 2009
- Publication place: United States
- Media type: Print (hardcover)
- Pages: 448
- ISBN: 978-0-307-39396-8
- Preceded by: Nobody Likes You: Inside the Turbulent Life, Times and Music of Green Day
- Followed by: Jagger: Rebel, Rock Star, Rambler, Rogue

Bowie: A Biography is a biography on the life and times of musician David Bowie, a twentieth century music and cultural icon. The book is written by Marc Spitz and was released on October 27, 2009, by the Crown Publishing Group.

== Synopsis ==
Following Bowie's life from his start as David Jones, an R&B-loving kid from Bromley, England, to his rise to rock’n’roll stardom as David Bowie, Bowie recounts his career and also reveals how much his music has influenced other musicians. Along the way, Spitz reflects on how growing up with Bowie as his soundtrack and how writing this book on Bowie influenced him in ways he never expected.

Bowie takes a look at the culture of postwar England in which Bowie grew up, the mod and hippie scenes of swinging London in the sixties, the sex- and drug-fueled glitter scene of the early seventies when Bowie's alter-ego Ziggy Stardust was born, his rise to global stardom in the eighties and his status as an elder statesman of alternative culture.

The book explores Bowie's struggles to go from follower to leader, his tricky relationship with art and commerce and Buddhism and the occult, his family life, and his open romantic relationship. An evaluation of his recorded work, as well as his film, stage and video performances, is included.

The book is based on a hundred original interviews with those who knew him best and those familiar with his work, including ex-wife Angie Bowie, former Bowie manager Kenneth Pitt, Siouxsie Sioux, Camille Paglia, Dick Cavett, Todd Haynes, Ricky Gervais and Peter Frampton.
