= The Victoria, Bayswater =

Listed pub in London, England

The Victoria
- The pub in 2025

General information
- Type: Public house
- Location: 10A Strathearn Place, Bayswater, London, England
- Coordinates: 51.51342°N 0.17125°W
- Year built: c. 1840–1850; 176 years ago
- Renovated: 1897–98 (remodelled); 1955–1958 (refurbished)
- Owner: Church Commissioners

Design and construction
- Designations

Listed Building – Grade II
- Official name: Victoria public house
- Designated: 10 April 1975
- Reference no.: 1109949

Renovating team
- Other designers: Bryan and Norman Westwood (1955–1958; possible)

Website
- victoriapaddington.co.uk

The Victoria is a Grade II listed public house on Strathearn Place in Bayswater, London, England. Built in the mid-19th century, it is particularly noted for its well-preserved Victorian interior, including bar fittings that the Campaign for Real Ale (CAMRA) dates to 1864. The pub is included on CAMRA's National Inventory of Historic Pub Interiors, where its interior is rated three stars and regarded as being of "outstanding national historic importance".

== History ==
The building was constructed as a public house in about 1840 to 1850 and underwent extensive remodelling in 1897–98, when much of its distinctive interior was created. The Campaign for Real Ale (CAMRA) gives a more specific construction date of 1837–38. The surviving fittings, including decorative mirrors, tiles and portraits of Queen Victoria, are unusual examples of a largely intact Victorian pub interior. Further alterations, particularly to the upper floors, were undertaken between 1955 and 1958, possibly to designs by Bryan and Norman Westwood. During this programme, fittings salvaged from the demolished Gaiety Theatre were incorporated into the first-floor Theatre Bar and other rooms. The pub later hosted an early performance by David Bowie in 1966.

On 10 April 1975, The Victoria was designated a Grade II listed building. It was included on the Campaign for Real Ale (CAMRA)'s National Inventory of Historic Pub Interiors before the inventory's grading system was revised. Under the revised scheme, it is rated three stars and its interior is regarded as being "of outstanding national historic importance".

The pub was formerly owned and operated by Fuller, Smith & Turner, trading under the Fuller's brand. As of July 2026, the freehold was owned by the Church Commissioners, while Fuller's held the lease and continued to operate the pub.

== Architecture ==
=== Exterior ===
The building is constructed of stuccoed brick with slate roofs and occupies a prominent acute corner site. It rises to four storeys above a basement, with a rounded frontage and additional bays extending along Strathearn Place and Sussex Place. The exterior is distinguished by a high parapet and decorative moulded bands. The upper floors retain sash windows with glazing bars set within moulded surrounds, while the projecting first-floor bay has a balcony and larger three-part window. Similar windows light the ground-floor bars, and cast-iron railings line the frontage.

=== Interior ===
The ground floor is arranged around a long central bar and retains much of its late Victorian character. Although the interior has been altered over time, evidence survives of an earlier subdivision, including part of a former partition at the Sussex Place end. The principal bar fittings include an original counter and an elaborate back bar, while decorative elements such as stained glass, panelling, tiles and framed images contribute to the rich decorative scheme. CAMRA dates the bar fittings to 1864 on the basis of a dated clock incorporated into the bar-back and has suggested that the bar-back may be among the oldest surviving examples in Britain. The counter also survives from this period and retains a functioning brass water dispenser formerly used to dilute spirits. A saloon on the Strathearn Place frontage retains fitted cupboards and an ornamental fireplace, and further alterations in the mid-20th century introduced additional period-style detailing, including a neo-Adamesque fireplace. The building's multiple external entrances also reflect the historic division of the pub into separate drinking areas.

The first floor was extensively remodelled in the late 1950s to create the Theatre Bar, incorporating fittings salvaged from the demolished Gaiety Theatre. Its design includes columned gallery fronts, theatre-inspired decorative features and a bar back depicting the theatre itself. An adjoining dining room was similarly refitted in a neo-Queen Anne style, with panelling, fireplaces and built-in cupboards that may also derive from the Gaiety Theatre.

== Gallery ==
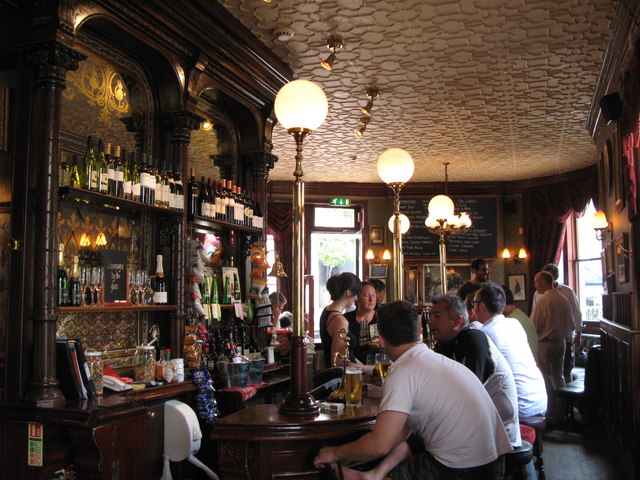
The ground floor bar

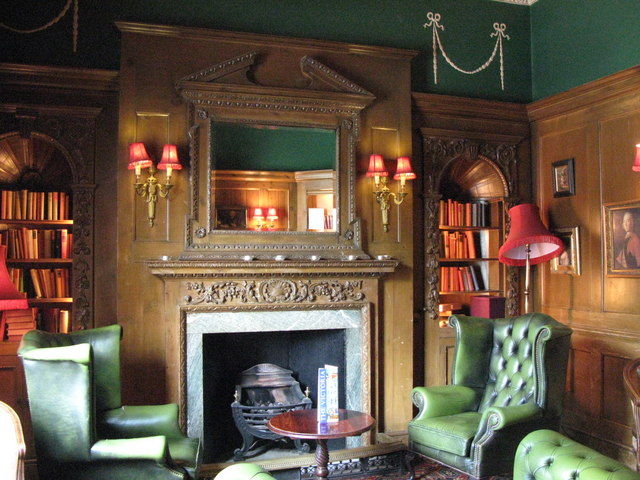
The Library bar

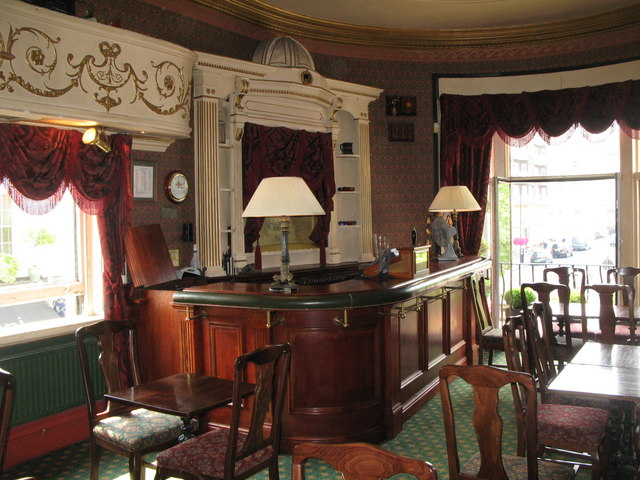
The Theatre bar

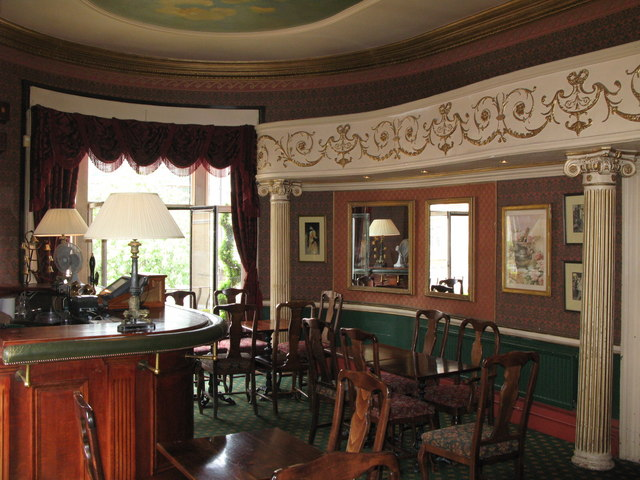
The Theatre bar

== See also ==
- List of pubs in London
