= Do Anything You Say =

1966 single by David Bowie

Single by David Bowie
- B-side: "Good Morning Girl"
- Released: 1 April 1966
- Recorded: 7 March 1966
- Studio: Pye, London
- Genre: Beat
- Length: 2:32
- Label: Pye
- Songwriter: David Bowie
- Producer: Tony Hatch

David Bowie singles chronology
"Can't Help Thinking About Me" (1966)	"Do Anything You Say" (1966)	"I Dig Everything" (1966)

"Do Anything You Say" is a single by the English musician David Bowie, his first release solely credited to himself. Released by Pye Records on 1 April 1966, it was produced by Tony Hatch and featured contributions from his new backing band, the Buzz. The song failed to chart and has been negatively received by his biographers.

== Overview ==
Two weeks after the release of "Can't Help Thinking About Me", David Bowie departed from the Lower Third, mostly due to the insistence of his then-manager Ralph Horton. He quickly assembled a new band from various advertisements in Melody Maker. Nicknamed the Buzz, the band consisted of guitarist John Hutchinson, bassist Derek Fearnley, drummer John Eager and keyboardist Derek Boyes. On 22 February 1966, Bowie and the Buzz demoed a new track, "Do Anything You Say", at London's Regent Sound Studios before properly recording it on 7 March at Marble Arch Studios, three days after performing "Can't Help Thinking About Me" on the ATV programme Ready Steady Go!. Also recorded was the chosen B-side, "Good Morning Girl", another Bowie-penned track. Tony Hatch played piano and produced the session, after doing the same for "Can't Help Thinking About Me".

Bowie's biographers have responded negatively to the song. While O'Leary calls it "a product of an apparent songwriting lull on Bowie's part", Nicholas Pegg finds it "unimaginative" and "betrays little promise" when comparing it to Bowie's other songs from 1966. James Perone calls it the "least memorable" of Bowie's three singles for Pye Records. The song itself is influenced by the contemporary soul and R&B sound, featuring call-and-response harmonies similar to the Who's recent hit "Anyway, Anyhow, Anywhere". O'Leary notes that it lacks contrasting bridges or solos. Bowie later used two lines for his 1969 track "Conversation Piece". Lyrically, the song sees a character conforms to his significant other after she rejects him. "Good Morning Girl", on the other hand, is a jazz-inflicted track that was more positively received.

"Do Anything You Say" was issued in the United Kingdom by Pye on 1 April 1966, with the catalogue number 7N 17079 and backed by "Good Morning Girl". It was the first single solely credited to "David Bowie". Like its predecessors, it failed to chart. A review published in Melody Maker by singer Dusty Springfield read: "I haven't got a clue who this is either, but I can see the effort that has gone into this record. It's nice. The sound is a bit messy." The song would later be included in the 1991 compilation Early On (1964–1966) and the 1999 reissue I Dig Everything: The 1966 Pye Singles. In a 2016 list ranking every Bowie single from worst to best, Ultimate Classic Rock placed "Do Anything You Say" at number 111 (out of 119).

== Personnel ==
According to Chris O'Leary:

- David Bowie – lead vocal
- John Hutchinson – lead guitar, backing vocal
- Derek Fearnley – bass, backing vocal
- John Eager – drums, backing vocal
- Derek Boyes – keyboards, backing vocal
- Tony Hatch – piano, producer
