= Three Rivers Press =

Trade paperback imprint of the Crown publishing group

- Parent company: Crown Publishing Group (Random House)
- Founded: 1992
- Country of origin: United States
- Headquarters location: New York City
- Publication types: Books
- Official website: www.randomhouse.com/crown/trp.html

Three Rivers Press is the trade paperback imprint of the Crown Publishing Group, a division of Random House. It publishes original paperback titles as well as paperback reprints of books issued initially in hardcover by the other Crown imprints.

== History ==
The Crown Publishing Group launched its first paperback imprint, Crown Trade Paperbacks, in 1992. Five years later, the imprint decided to re-brand itself as Three Rivers Press, named for the Harlem, East and Hudson rivers that border Manhattan, as well as the three hardcover imprints (Crown, Harmony, and Clarkson Potter) that initially fed the list. In 2010, Three Rivers began the paperback publisher for Crown Archetype and Harmony Books.
