= List of awards and nominations received by David Bowie =

David Bowie
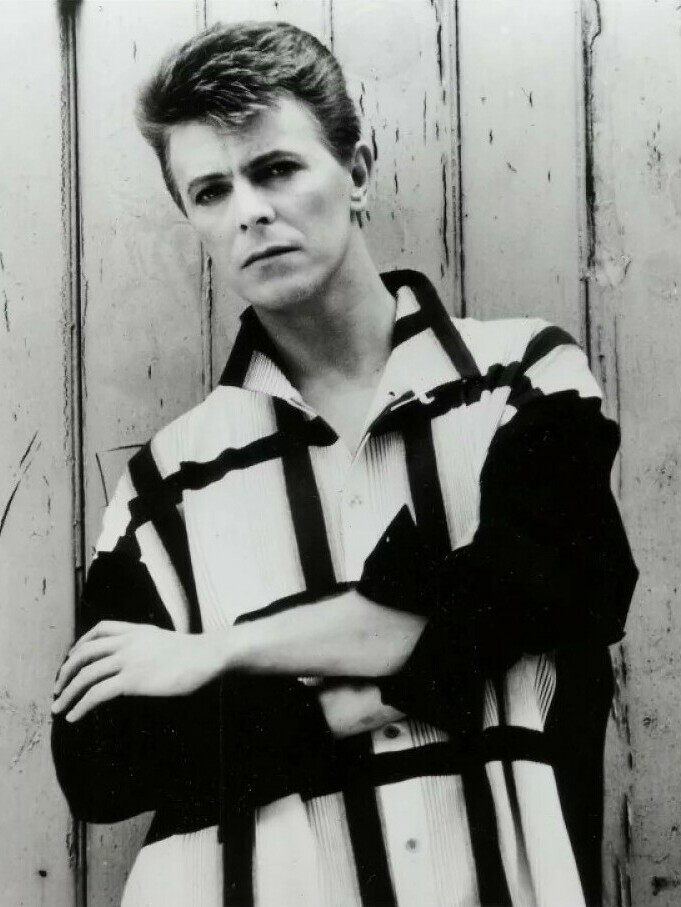
- Bowie in 1984
Awards and nominations
Award	Wins	Nominations
American Music Awards	0	1
BAFTA Awards	1	2
BRIT Awards	4	12
BRIT Icon Awards	1	1
CFDA Awards	1	1
Daytime Emmy Awards	1	1
Rock & Pop Awards	1	1
Echo Awards	1	1
Golden Globe Awards	0	1
GQ Awards	1	1
Grammy Awards	6	17
Ivor Novello Awards	4	5
Juno Awards	0	2
Melody Maker Awards	7	15
Mercury Prize	0	3
MOJO Awards	0	4
MTV Movie Awards	0	1
MTV Video Music Awards	4	14
MuchMusic Video Awards	1	4
NME Awards	11	16
Ondas Awards	1	1
Outer Critics Circle Awards	2	2
Q Awards	1	9
Saturn Awards	1	1
Silver Clef Awards	1	1
UK Music Video Awards	1	3
WB Radio Music Awards	1	1
Webby Awards	1	1
World Music Awards	1	1

Totals (Note: Certain award groups do not simply award one winner. They acknowledge several different recipients, have runners-up, and have third place. Since this is a specific recognition and is different from losing an award, runner-up mentions are considered wins in this award tally. For simplification and to avoid errors, each award in this list has been presumed to have had a prior nomination.)
- Wins: 73
- Nominations: 188

David Bowie was an English musician and actor. Throughout his career, he won 73 awards from a total of 188 nominations.

He began his singing career under the name David Bowie in 1966 and won his first award in 1969, when he won an Ivor Novello Award for the song "Space Oddity". Bowie's first hit album was Hunky Dory in 1971 which reached number three in the UK Albums Chart. Despite his next eleven studio albums all making the UK Top 10—including four number one albums—he did not receive any more music awards or nominations until the early 1980s. He has since won numerous awards for his music, including: four BRIT Awards—Best British Male Solo Artist at the 1984 and 2014 BRIT Awards, an Outstanding Contribution Award at the 1996 BRIT Awards and an Icon Award at the 2016 Brit Awards which was awarded to him posthumously; six Grammy Awards including Best Video, Short Form for the David Bowie video at the 1985 Grammy Awards and a Lifetime Achievement Award at the 2006 Grammy Awards; and four MTV Video Music Awards—Best Male Video for "China Girl" and a Video Vanguard Award at the 1984 MTV Video Music Awards, Best Overall Performance in a Video for "Dancing in the Street" at the 1986 MTV Video Music Awards, and Best Art Direction for "Blackstar" at the 2016 MTV Video Music Awards.

Bowie began his acting career in the 1967 short film The Image. His first leading role was in the 1976 science fiction film The Man Who Fell to Earth, a role for which he won a Saturn Award for Best Actor at the 1976 Saturn Awards. He has also had an innovative presence on the Internet which led to his being awarded a lifetime achievement Webby Award in 2007 for "pushing the boundaries of art and technology with his digital empire".

== AMFT Awards ==
Year	Nominee / work	Award	Result	Ref.
2016	David Bowie	Lifetime Achievement Award	Won	
2016	"Blackstar"	Best Rock Song	Won	
2016	"Blackstar"	Best Rock Solo Performance	Won	

== American Music Awards ==
The American Music Awards are awarded for outstanding achievements in the music industry. Bowie has received one nomination.

Year	Nominated work	Award	Result
1984	David Bowie	Favorite Pop/Rock Male Artist	Nominated

== BAFTA Awards ==
The BAFTA Television Awards are awarded by the British Academy of Film and Television Arts. Bowie has received one nomination.

Year	Nominated work	Award	Result
1994	The Buddha of Suburbia	Best Original Television Music	Nominated

The BAFTA Interactive Entertainment Awards were awarded by the British Academy of Film and Television Arts for multimedia entertainment. Bowie has received one win.

Year	Nominee	Award	Result
2000	David Bowie	Berners-Lee Award for best personal contribution	Won

== BMI Pop Awards ==
Year	Nominee / work	Award	Result	Ref.
1999	"Heroes"	Award-Winning Song	Won	

== Billboard Music Awards ==
The Billboard Music Awards are held to honour artists for commercial performance in the U.S., based on record charts published by Billboard.

Year	Nominated work	Award	Result
1987	Himself	Top Billboard 200 Artist	Nominated
1987	Himself	Top Hot 100 Artist – Male	Nominated
1987	Never Let Me Down	Top Billboard 200 Album	Nominated

== Brit Awards ==
The Brit Awards are the British Phonographic Industry's annual pop music awards. Bowie has four wins from twelve nominations. In addition, he received the Outstanding Contribution to Music in 1996 and he received the British Icon Award posthumously in 2016.

Year	Nominated work	Award	Result
1984	David Bowie	British Male Solo Artist	Won
1985	David Bowie	British Male Solo Artist	Nominated
1986	"Dancing in the Street"	British Single of the Year	Nominated
1986	"Dancing in the Street"	British Video of the Year	Nominated
1994	"Jump They Say"	British Video of the Year	Nominated
1998	"Little Wonder"	British Video of the Year	Nominated
2000	David Bowie	British Male Solo Artist	Nominated
2004	David Bowie	British Male Solo Artist	Nominated
2014	David Bowie	British Male Solo Artist	Won
2014	The Next Day	British Album of the Year	Nominated
2017	David Bowie	British Male Solo Artist	Won
2017	Blackstar	British Album of the Year	Won

=== Outstanding Contribution Award ===
Year	Award	Result
1996	Outstanding Contribution to Music	Won

=== British Icon Award ===
Year	Award	Result
2016	British Icon Award	Won

== Classic Pop Reader Awards ==
Classic Pop is a monthly British music magazine, which launched in October 2012.

Year	Nominee / work	Award	Result
2019	A New Career in a New Town (1977–1982)	Reissue of the Year	Won

== Classic Rock Awards ==
Year	Nominee / work	Award	Result	Ref.
2010	Station to Station	Reissue of the Year	Nominated	
2011	"Changes"	Best Commercial	Nominated	
2012	The Rise and Fall of Ziggy Stardust and the Spiders from Mars	Reissue of the Year	Nominated	
2016	Scary Monsters (and Super Creeps)	Reissue of the Year	Won	
2016	David Bowie	Artist of the Year	Nominated	
2016	★	Album of the Year	Nominated	
2016	"Lazarus"	Song of the Year	Nominated	
2017	A New Career in a New Town (1977–1982)	Best Box-Set or Reissue	Nominated	
2017	No Plan	Best Classic Rock Album	Nominated	

== Daytime Emmy Awards ==
The Daytime Emmy Awards are awarded by the National Academy of Television Arts and Sciences in the United States. Bowie has won one award from one nomination.

Year	Nominated work	Award	Result
2003	Hollywood Rocks the Movies: The 1970s Joint nomination with Kevin Burns, David Sehring and Patty Ivins Specht	Outstanding Special Class Special	Won

== GAFFA Awards ==
=== Denmark GAFFA Awards ===
Delivered since 1991, the GAFFA Awards are a Danish award that rewards popular music by the magazine of the same name.

Year	Nominee / work	Award	Result	Ref.
1993	Himself	Solo Act	Nominated	
1995	Himself	Foreign Solo Act	Nominated	
1997	Himself	Foreign Male Act	Nominated	
1999	Himself	Foreign Male Act	Won	
2003	Himself	Foreign Male Act	Won	
2004	Reality	Best Foreign DVD	Nominated	
2016	Himself	Best Foreign Male Act	Won	

=== Sweden GAFFA Awards ===
Delivered since 2010, the GAFFA Awards (Swedish: GAFFA Priset) are a Swedish award that rewards popular music awarded by the magazine of the same name.

Year	Nominee / work	Award	Result	Ref.
2013	Himself	Best Foreign Solo Act	Won	

== Golden Globe Awards ==
The Golden Globe Awards are awarded by the Hollywood Foreign Press Association in the United States. Bowie has received one nomination.

Year	Nominated work	Award	Result
1983	"Theme from Cat People" (from the film Cat People); Joint nomination with Giorgio Moroder	Best Original Song – Motion Picture	Nominated

== GQ Awards ==
The GQ Award is an annual awards ceremony founded by the men's magazine GQ. Bowie has received one award from one nomination.

Year	Nominee / work	Award	Result
2000	David Bowie	Most Stylish Man of the Year	Won

== Grammy Awards ==
The Grammy Awards are awarded annually by the National Academy of Recording Arts and Sciences in the United States for outstanding achievements in the record industry. Bowie has won five competitive awards from seventeen nominations. In 2006, he received the Grammy Lifetime Achievement Award.

In addition, David Bowie's song "Sue (Or in a Season of Crime)" won the Grammy for the Best Arrangement, Instrumental and Vocals for bandleader Maria Schneider at the 58th Annual Grammy Awards.

In 2024, he was posthumously nominated again for Brett Morgan's Moonage Daydream and won the award for Best Music Film.

Year	Nominated work	Award	Result
1978	David Bowie Narrates Prokofiev's Peter and the Wolf	Best Recording For Children	Nominated
1984	Let's Dance	Album of the Year	Nominated
1984	"Cat People (Putting Out Fire)"	Best Rock Vocal Performance, Male	Nominated
1985	"Blue Jean"	Best Rock Vocal Performance, Male	Nominated
1985	Jazzin' for Blue Jean	Best Video, Short Form	Won
1985	Serious Moonlight	Best Music Film	Nominated
1998	Earthling	Best Alternative Music Performance	Nominated
1998	"Dead Man Walking"	Best Male Rock Vocal Performance	Nominated
2001	"Thursday's Child"	Best Male Rock Vocal Performance	Nominated
2003	"Slow Burn"	Best Male Rock Vocal Performance	Nominated
2004	"New Killer Star"	Best Male Rock Vocal Performance	Nominated
2014	"The Stars (Are Out Tonight)"	Best Rock Performance	Nominated
2014	The Next Day	Best Rock Album	Nominated
2017	"Blackstar"	Best Rock Performance	Won
2017	"Blackstar"	Best Rock Song	Won
2017	Blackstar	Best Alternative Music Album	Won
2017	Blackstar	Best Engineered Album, Non-Classical	Won
2024	Moonage Daydream	Best Music Film	Won

=== Grammy Lifetime Achievement ===
Year	Award	Result
2006	Lifetime Achievement Award	Won

== Hungarian Music Awards ==
Hungarian Music Awards is the national music awards of Hungary, held every year since 1992 and promoted by Mahasz.

Year	Nominee / work	Award	Result
2000	Hours	Best Foreign Rock Album	Nominated
2003	Heathen	Best Foreign Rock Album	Nominated
2014	The Next Day	Pop/Rock Album of the Year	Nominated
2017	Blackstar	Pop/Rock Album of the Year	Won

== Ivor Novello Awards ==
The Ivor Novello Awards are awarded annually by the British Academy of Composers and Songwriters to honour songwriting and composing. Bowie has won four awards from five nomination. On 10 May 1970, David Bowie performed that night in awards accompanied by the Les Reed Orchestra.

Year	Nominated work	Award	Result
1969	"Space Oddity"	Special Award For Originality	Won
1984	"Let's Dance"	The Best Rock Song	Won
1984	"Let's Dance"	International Hit of the Year	Won
1984	"Let's Dance"	The Best Selling A-Side	Nominated
1990	Himself	Outstanding Contribution to British Music	Won

== Juno Awards ==
The Juno Awards are presented annually to Canadian musical artists and bands to acknowledge their artistic and technical achievements in all aspects of music. New members of the Canadian Music Hall of Fame are also inducted as part of the awards ceremonies.

Year	Nominee / work	Award	Result
1984	Let's Dance	International Album of the Year	Nominated
1984	"Let's Dance"	International Single of the Year	Nominated

== Mercury Prize ==
The Mercury Prize is awarded by the British Phonographic Industry and the British Association of Record Dealers for the best album from the United Kingdom or Ireland. Bowie has received three nominations.

Year	Nominated work	Award	Result
2002	Heathen	Mercury Prize	Nominated
2013	The Next Day	Mercury Prize	Nominated
2016	Blackstar	Mercury Prize	Nominated

== Mojo Awards ==
The MOJO Awards are awarded by the British music magazine Mojo. Bowie has received four nominations.

Year	Nominated work	Award	Result
2004	David Bowie	Icon Award	Nominated
2004	David Bowie	Inspiration Award	Nominated
2005	David Bowie	Icon Award	Nominated
2006	David Bowie	Icon Award	Nominated

== MTV ==
=== MTV Movie Awards ===
The MTV Movie Awards are awarded by the television channel MTV for best in film. Bowie has received one nomination.

Year	Nominated work	Award	Result
2002	Zoolander	Best Cameo	Nominated

=== MTV Video Music Awards ===
The MTV Video Music Awards were established in 1984 by MTV to celebrate the top music videos of the year. Bowie has won three awards from nine nominations.

Year	Nominated work	Award	Result
1984	"China Girl"	Best Male Video	Won
1984	"China Girl"	Best Overall Performance in a Video	Nominated
1984	"China Girl"	Best Cinematography in a Video	Nominated
1984	"Modern Love"	Best Stage Performance in a Video	Nominated
1984	David Bowie	Video Vanguard Award	Won
1985	"Blue Jean (live)"	Best Stage Performance in a Video	Nominated
1986	"Dancing in the Street"	Best Overall Performance in a Video	Won
1987	"Day-In Day-Out"	Best Male Video	Nominated
1998	"I'm Afraid of Americans"	Best Male Video	Nominated
1999	www.davidbowie.com	Best Artist Website	Nominated
2016	"Lazarus"	Best Direction	Nominated
2016	"Lazarus"	Best Editing	Nominated
2016	"Lazarus"	Best Cinematography	Nominated
2016	"Blackstar"	Best Art Direction	Won

== iHeartRadio Much Music Video Awards ==
The iHeartRadio Much Music Video Awards are annually presented by the Canadian music video channel Much to honour the year's best music videos. Bowie has won one award from one nomination.

Year	Nominated work	Award	Result
1998	"I'm Afraid of Americans"	EyePopper Award	Won

== Music Video Production Awards ==
The MVPA Awards are annually presented by a Los Angeles-based music trade organization to honor the year's best music videos.

Year	Nominee / work	Award	Result
2013	"The Stars (Are Out Tonight)"	Best Hair	Won
2013	"The Stars (Are Out Tonight)"	Best Director of a Male Artist	Nominated
2013	"The Stars (Are Out Tonight)"	Best Art Direction	Nominated
2013	"The Stars (Are Out Tonight)"	Best Colorist	Nominated

== NME Awards ==
The NME Awards is an annual music awards show, founded by the music magazine NME, where the winners are decided by public votes. David Bowie has received eleven awards from eleven nominations.

Year	Nominee / work	Award	Result
1973	David Bowie	World Male Singer	Won
1973	David Bowie	British Male Singer	Won
1974	David Bowie	World Male Singer	Won
1974	David Bowie	British Male Singer	Won
1974	David Bowie	Best Producer	Won
1977	David Bowie	Best Male Singer	Won
1978	David Bowie	Best Male Singer	Won
1981	David Bowie	Best Male Singer	Won
1983	David Bowie	Best Male Singer	Won
1983	David Bowie	Best Dressed Male	Won
1996	David Bowie	Best Solo Artist	Nominated
2000	David Bowie	Best Solo Artist	Nominated
2013	David Bowie	Hero of the Year	Nominated
2013	"Where Are We Now?"	Best Video	Nominated
2014	David Bowie	Best Solo Artist	Nominated
2014	David Bowie	Hero of the Year	Nominated
2016	Five Years (1969–1973)	Best Reissue	Won
2017	David Bowie	Hero of the Year	Nominated

== New Music Awards ==
The New Music Awards are given for excellence in music to both recording artists and radio stations by New Music Weekly magazine.

Year	Nominee / work	Award	Result
2017	Himself	College Artist of the Year	Won

== Pollstar Concert Industry Awards ==
The Pollstar Concert Industry Awards is an annual award ceremony to honor artists and professionals in the concert industry.

Year	Nominee / work	Award	Result
1988	Himself	Comeback of the Year	Nominated
1988	Glass Spider Tour	Most Creative Stage Production	Nominated
1991	Sound+Vision Tour	Most Creative Stage Production	Nominated
1996	Outside Tour (w/Nine Inch Nails)	Most Creative Stage Production	Nominated
1998	Earthling Tour	Small Hall Tour of the Year	Nominated

== Porin ==
Year	Nominated work	Award	Result
2014	The Next Day	Best International Album	Won

== Q Awards ==
The Q Awards are hosted annually by the British music magazine Q. Bowie has won one award from nine nominations.

Year	Nominated work	Award	Result
1995	David Bowie	Q Inspiration Award	Won
2002	Heathen	Best Producer	Nominated
2004	David Bowie	Best Live Act	Nominated
2013	"Where Are We Now?"	Best Track	Nominated
2013	"The Stars (Are Out Tonight)"	Best Video	Nominated
2013	The Next Day	Best Album	Nominated
2013	David Bowie	Best Solo Artist	Nominated
2013	David Bowie	Best Act in the World Today	Nominated
2013	David Bowie at the V&A	Best Event	Nominated

== Rockbjörnen ==
The Rockbjörnen is a music award ceremony in Sweden, established in 1979 by the Aftonbladet, one of the largest newspapers in Nordic countries.

Year	Nominee / work	Award	Result
1982	Himself	Best Foreign Artist	Won
1983	Himself	Best Foreign Artist	Won

== Saturn Awards ==
The Saturn Awards are awarded by the Academy of Science Fiction, Fantasy & Horror Films in the United States. Bowie has won one award from one nomination.

Year	Nominated work	Award	Result
1976	The Man Who Fell to Earth	Best Actor	Won

== Silver Clef Awards ==
The Silver Clef Award are an annual UK music awards lunch which has been running since 1976. Bowie has received one award.

Year	Nominee / work	Award	Result
1987	Himself	Silver Celf Award	Won

== The Daily Californian Art Awards ==
Year	Nominee / work	Award	Result	Ref.
2016	"★"	Best Music Video	Nominated	

== UK Music Video Awards ==
The UK Music Video Awards is an annual award ceremony founded in 2008 to recognise creativity, technical excellence and innovation in music videos and moving images for music. Bowie has received one award from three nominations.

Year	Nominee / work	Award	Result
2016	"Blackstar"	Best Production Design	Won
2016	"Blackstar"	Best Rock/Indie Video	Nominated
2016	"Lazarus"	Best Rock/Indie Video	Nominated

== WB Radio Music Awards ==
The WB Radio Music Awards are awarded annually in the United States to honour performers and on-air radio personalities. Bowie has won one award from one nomination.

Year	Nominated work	Award	Result
1999	David Bowie	Legend Award	Won

== Webby Awards ==
Presented by the International Academy of Digital Arts and Sciences, Webby Awards are awarded for excellence on the Internet. Bowie has won one award from one nomination.

Year	Nominated work	Award	Result
2007	David Bowie	Webby Lifetime Achievement	Won

== Wembley Arena Awards ==
Year	Nominee / work	Award	Result	Ref.
2003	David Bowie	Wembley Male Artist of the Year	Won	

== World Music Awards ==
Bowie was honoured with an award for Outstanding Lifelong Contribution to the Music Industry (also known as Legend Award) at the 2nd edition of the World Music Awards. He accepted the award via video call.

Year	Nominee / work	Award	Result	Ref.
1990	David Bowie	Legend Award	Won	

== Žebřík Music Awards ==
Year	Nominee / work	Award	Result	Ref.
1996	David Bowie	Best International Enjoyment	Nominated	
1996	David Bowie	Best International Personality	Nominated	
1997	David Bowie	Best International Male	Nominated	
1997	Earthling	Best International Album	Nominated	
1999	Hours	Best International Album	Nominated	
1999	"Thursday's Child"	Best International Song	Nominated	
1999	David Bowie	Best International Male	Nominated	
1999	David Bowie	Best International Personality	Nominated	
2000	David Bowie	Best International Personality	Nominated	
2002	David Bowie	Best International Personality	Nominated	
2002	David Bowie	Best International Male	Nominated	
2002	Heathen	Best International Album	Nominated	
2003	David Bowie	Best International Male	Nominated	
2003	David Bowie	Best International Personality	Won	
2015	"★"	Best International Song	Nominated	
2015	David Bowie	Best International Male	Nominated	
2016	David Bowie	Best International Male	Nominated	
2016	The death of David Bowie	Best International Průser	Nominated	
2016	★	Best International Album	Nominated	
2016	"Lazarus"	Best International Song	Nominated	
2016	"Lazarus"	Best International Video	Nominated	

== Other honours ==
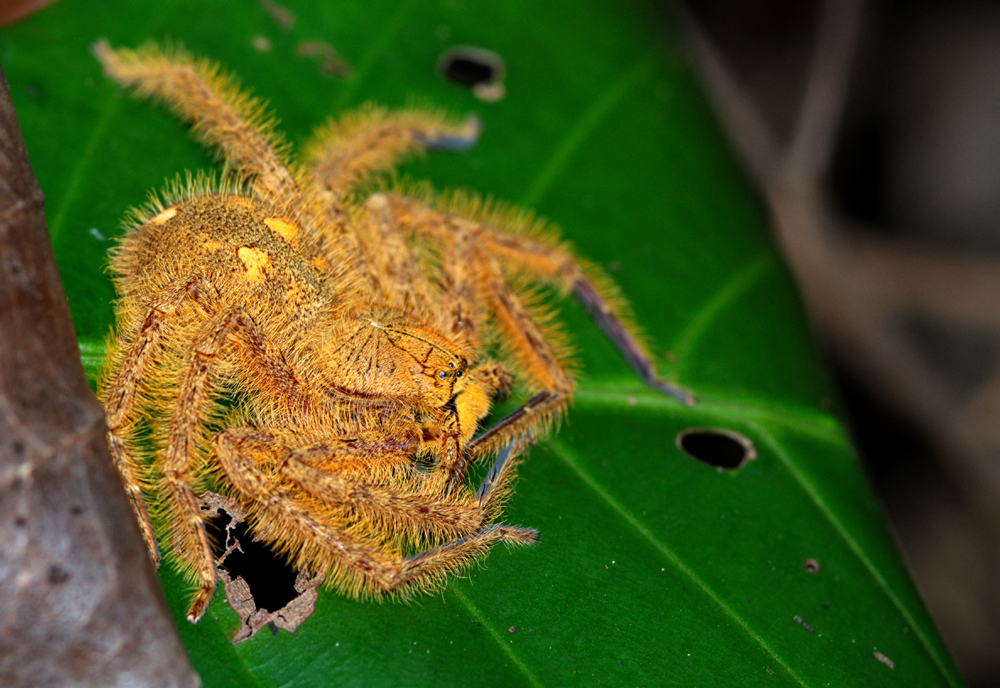
The spider Heteropoda davidbowie

Bowie's first award was at the Malta International Song Festival in July 1969 where he won best-produced record. Bowie was inducted to the Rock and Roll Hall of Fame in 1996 and received a star on the Hollywood Walk of Fame in 1997, which is located at 7201 Hollywood Blvd. In 1999, Bowie was made a Commander of the Ordre des Arts et des Lettres and he received an honorary doctorate from Berklee College of Music. He has been reported to have declined the British honour Commander of the Order of the British Empire (CBE) in 2000, and a knighthood in 2003.

Bowie was inducted by the Science Fiction and Fantasy Hall of Fame in June 2013.

In September 2011, Bowie became one of several prominent local figures to feature on the Brixton Pound, a local currency that is available as an alternative to the pound sterling in the Brixton area. Bowie's face appears on the B£10 note.

The spider Heteropoda davidbowie is named in his honour and, following his death on 10 January, Cincinnati Zoo and Botanical Garden announced that the first animal born in 2016 – a blue penguin chick – would be named Bowie after the late singer.

On 5 January 2015, a few days before his 68th birthday, a main-belt asteroid was named (342843) Davidbowie in his honour. On 13 January 2016, Belgian astronomers at MIRA Public Observatory in conjunction with radio station Studio Brussels registered a new asterism of seven stars in the vicinity of Mars at the date of Bowie's death that, when connected, form the lightning bolt seen on Bowie's face on the cover of his Aladdin Sane album.
