= Legacy (The Very Best of David Bowie) =

Greatest hits album by David Bowie
- Released: 11 November 2016
- Recorded: 1969–2015
- Genre: Rock
- Length: 150:55 (2-disc); 77:04 (1-disc)
- Label: Parlophone (UK); Columbia (US); Legacy (US)

David Bowie chronology
Lazarus (Original Cast Recording) (2016)	Legacy (The Very Best of David Bowie) (2016)	No Plan (2017)

David Bowie compilation chronology
Nothing Has Changed (2014)	Legacy (2016)

Singles from Legacy
- 1. "Life on Mars? (2016 Mix)" Released: 7 October 2016

Professional ratings
Review scores
Source	Rating
AllMusic	4.5/5 stars

Legacy (The Very Best of David Bowie) (also known as Legacy) is a greatest hits album by English musician David Bowie, released on 11 November 2016 through Sony Music Entertainment in the US and Warner Music Group in the UK and several territories. Legacy marks Bowie’s first title to reach 400 weeks on the UK albums chart and is one of the albums which have spent the most weeks on the chart.

The album's contents are mostly identical to the two-disc edition of Bowie's previous greatest hits album Nothing Has Changed (2014). "Love Is Lost" and "Sue (Or in a Season of Crime)", which were present on Nothing Has Changed, are replaced by three new selections: "Lazarus" and "I Can't Give Everything Away", both from Bowie's final studio album Blackstar (2016), and the radio edit of the Heathen song "Slow Burn" (which also appears on the three-disc version of Nothing Has Changed). Additionally, a new mix of "Life on Mars?" by Ken Scott, the song's original co-producer, replaces the original version from Hunky Dory (1971), and was released as a single and a special music video to promote the compilation.

A one-disc version, with a non-chronological track listing, was also made available in some markets. A vinyl LP is also available.

== Track listing ==
All songs written by David Bowie, except where noted.

=== Two-disc version ===
Disc one

No.	Title	Writer(s)	Place of origin	Length
1.	"Space Oddity"		David Bowie	5:14
2.	"The Man Who Sold the World"		The Man Who Sold the World	3:57
3.	"Changes"		Hunky Dory	3:35
4.	"Oh! You Pretty Things"		Hunky Dory	3:12
5.	"Life on Mars?" (2016 mix)		Hunky Dory	3:40
6.	"Starman" (original single mix)		The Rise and Fall of Ziggy Stardust and the Spiders from Mars	4:12
7.	"Ziggy Stardust"		The Rise and Fall of Ziggy Stardust and the Spiders from Mars	3:12
8.	"Moonage Daydream"		The Rise and Fall of Ziggy Stardust and the Spiders from Mars	4:39
9.	"The Jean Genie" (original single mix)		Aladdin Sane	4:05
10.	"All the Young Dudes"		outtake from Aladdin Sane	3:08
11.	"Drive-In Saturday"		Aladdin Sane	4:30
12.	"Sorrow"	Bob Feldman; Jerry Goldstein; Richard Gottehrer	Pin Ups	2:53
13.	"Rebel Rebel"		Diamond Dogs	4:30
14.	"Young Americans" (US single version)		Young Americans	3:13
15.	"Fame"	Bowie; John Lennon; Carlos Alomar	Young Americans	4:16
16.	"Golden Years" (single version)		Station to Station	3:27
17.	"Sound and Vision"		Low	3:03
18.	""Heroes"" (single version)	Bowie; Brian Eno	"Heroes"	3:33
19.	"Boys Keep Swinging"	Bowie; Eno	Lodger	3:17
20.	"Fashion" (single version)		Scary Monsters (And Super Creeps)	3:26
21.	"Ashes to Ashes" (single version)		Scary Monsters (And Super Creeps)	3:35

Disc two

No.	Title	Writer(s)	Place of Origin	Length
1.	"Under Pressure" (with Queen)	Bowie; John Deacon; Brian May; Freddie Mercury; Roger Taylor	Hot Space	4:08
2.	"Let's Dance" (single version)		Let's Dance	4:08
3.	"China Girl" (single version)	Bowie; Iggy Pop	Let's Dance	4:15
4.	"Modern Love" (single version)		Let's Dance	3:56
5.	"Blue Jean"		Tonight	3:11
6.	"This Is Not America" (with the Pat Metheny Group)	Bowie; Lyle Mays; Pat Metheny	The Falcon and the Snowman soundtrack	3:51
7.	"Dancing in the Street" (with Mick Jagger)	Marvin Gaye; William "Mickey" Stevenson; Ivy Jo Hunter	Non-album single	3:10
8.	"Absolute Beginners" (single version)		Absolute Beginners soundtrack	4:46
9.	"Jump They Say" (radio edit)		Black Tie White Noise	3:54
10.	"Hallo Spaceboy" (Pet Shop Boys remix; with the Pet Shop Boys)	Bowie; Eno	1. Outside	4:25
11.	"Little Wonder" (single version)	Bowie; Reeves Gabrels; Mark Plati	Earthling	3:42
12.	"I'm Afraid of Americans" (V1 Trent Reznor remix) (Radio edit)	Bowie; Eno	Earthling	4:25
13.	"Thursday's Child" (radio edit)	Bowie; Gabrels	'hours...'	4:26
14.	"Slow Burn" (radio edit)		Heathen	3:58
15.	"Everyone Says 'Hi'" (edited version)		Heathen	3:29
16.	"New Killer Star" (radio edit)		Reality	3:43
17.	"Where Are We Now?"		The Next Day	4:09
18.	"Lazarus" (single edit)		★	4:05
19.	"I Can't Give Everything Away" (single edit)		★	4:26

=== Single-disc version / Vinyl LP version ===
No.	Title	Writer(s)	Place of origin	Length
1.	"Let's Dance" (single version)		Let's Dance	4:08
2.	"Ashes to Ashes" (single version)		Scary Monsters (And Super Creeps)	3:35
3.	"Under Pressure" (with Queen)	Bowie; Deacon; May; Mercury; Taylor	Hot Space	4:08
4.	"Life on Mars?" (2016 mix)		Hunky Dory	3:35
5.	"Changes"		Hunky Dory	3:35
6.	"The Man Who Sold the World"		The Man Who Sold the World	3:57
7.	"Space Oddity"		David Bowie	5:14
8.	"Starman" (single version)		The Rise and Fall of Ziggy Stardust and the Spiders from Mars	4:08
9.	"Ziggy Stardust" (single version)		The Rise and Fall of Ziggy Stardust and the Spiders from Mars	4:08
10.	"The Jean Genie" (single version)		Aladdin Sane	4:05
11.	"Rebel Rebel"		Diamond Dogs	4:30
12.	"Young Americans" (single version)		Young Americans	3:15
13.	"Golden Years" (single version)		Station to Station	3:27
14.	"Modern Love" (single version)		Let's Dance	3:58
15.	"China Girl" (single version)		Let's Dance	4:15
16.	"Fame" (single version)		Young Americans	4:16
17.	"Sound and Vision"		Low	3:03
18.	"'Heroes'" (single version)		"Heroes"	3:33
19.	"Where Are We Now?"		The Next Day	4:09
20.	"Lazarus" (single version)		★	4:05

"Modern Love" is found in the US version only. In the UK/Europe version, Mick Jagger & David Bowie's "Dancing in the Street" is in its place. The UK/Europe vinyl LP version includes “Oh, You Pretty Things” that is not included on the US vinyl LP version.

== Charts ==
=== Weekly charts ===
Chart (2016–2017)	Peak position
Australian Albums (ARIA)	31
Belgian Albums (Ultratop Flanders)	13
Belgian Albums (Ultratop Wallonia)	39
Canadian Albums (Billboard)	64
Czech Albums (ČNS IFPI)	24
Dutch Albums (Album Top 100)	25
French Albums (SNEP)	52
German Albums (Offizielle Top 100)	59
Hungarian Albums (MAHASZ)	24
Irish Albums (IRMA)	7
Italian Albums (FIMI)	24
Japanese Albums (Oricon)	44
New Zealand Heatseekers Albums (RMNZ)	1
Portuguese Albums (AFP)	23
Scottish Albums (OCC)	4
Spanish Albums (PROMUSICAE)	38
UK Albums (OCC)	5
UK Vinyl Albums (OCC)	1
US Billboard 200	78
US Top Alternative Albums (Billboard)	5
US Top Rock Albums (Billboard)	14
US Vinyl Albums (Billboard)	5

Chart (2018)	Peak position
Croatian International Albums (HDU)	3
Portuguese Albums (AFP)	18

Chart (2019)	Peak position
Spanish Albums (Promusicae)	28

Chart (2022)	Peak position
Portuguese Albums (AFP)	13

=== Year-end charts ===
Chart (2016)	Position
UK Albums (OCC)	60
Chart (2017)	Position
Belgian Albums (Ultratop Flanders)	94
Belgian Albums (Ultratop Wallonia)	184
Dutch Vinyl Albums (MegaCharts)	38
UK Albums (OCC)	41
Chart (2018)	Position
Irish Albums (IRMA)	34
UK Albums (OCC)	41
Chart (2019)	Position
Irish Albums (IRMA)	44
UK Albums (OCC)	43
Chart (2020)	Position
Irish Albums (IRMA)	31
UK Albums (OCC)	35
Chart (2021)	Position
Irish Albums (IRMA)	36
UK Albums (OCC)	42
Chart (2022)	Position
UK Albums (OCC)	39
Chart (2023)	Position
UK Albums (OCC)	52
Chart (2024)	Position
UK Albums (OCC)	59
Chart (2025)	Position
UK Albums (OCC)	66

=== Decade-end chart ===
Decade-end chart performance for Legacy
Chart (2010–2019)	Position
UK Vinyl Albums (OCC)	17

=== All-time charts ===
All-time charts for Legacy
Chart (2015–2025)	Position
UK Vinyl Albums (OCC)	5

== Certifications ==
Region	Certification	Certified units/sales
France (SNEP)	Platinum	100,000^{‡}
Italy (FIMI)	Gold	25,000^{‡}
United Kingdom (BPI)	4× Platinum	1,200,000^{‡}
^{‡} Sales+streaming figures based on certification alone.
