= 'Tis a Pity She Was a Whore =

2014 single by David Bowie

Single by David Bowie
- A-side: "Sue (Or in a Season of Crime)"
- Released: 17 November 2014
- Recorded: 2014
- Studio: Bowie's home studio, New York City
- Genre: Art rock
- Length: 5:26
- Label: Parlophone; Columbia; Legacy
- Songwriter: David Bowie
- Producer: David Bowie

David Bowie singles chronology
"Love Is Lost (Hello Steve Reich Mix by James Murphy for the DFA)" (2013)	"Sue (Or in a Season of Crime)" / "'Tis a Pity She Was a Whore" (2014)	"Blackstar" (2015)

"'Tis a Pity She Was a Whore" is a song by English musician David Bowie, released on 17 November 2014 as the B-side of "Sue (Or in a Season of Crime)". Taking influence from John Ford's 1633 play 'Tis Pity She's a Whore, the art rock song pits dark and violent lyrics against a rhythmic beat. Bowie recorded the track as a demo in mid-2014 at his home studio in New York City.

The song, along with "Sue", was re-recorded for Bowie's twenty-sixth and final studio album, Blackstar (2016). The new version features the backing band from those sessions: saxophonist Donny McCaslin, pianist Jason Lindner, bassist Tim Lefebvre and drummer Mark Guiliana. Unlike the original, the remake is influenced by hip hop while reviewers compared Bowie's vocal performance to various 1970s tracks. The remake was positively received, with many highlighting the performances of the backing musicians. In the wake of Bowie's death, two days after Blackstar's release, "'Tis a Pity She Was a Whore" charted in multiple countries, including number 107 in the UK.

== Background and recording ==
Bowie recorded a home demo of "'Tis a Pity She Was a Whore" in mid-2014 at his home studio in his New York City apartment. It holds a distinction in his catalogue as being one of few songs in which he played every instrument himself. Upon hearing the demo, his regular collaborator Tony Visconti stated: "It was just kick-ass. His production skills have gone up 5,000%." The title derives from the 1633 play 'Tis Pity She's a Whore by 17th century English dramatist John Ford. However, while Ford's play is a tale of incestuous love and vengeance, the lyrics themselves are darker and more violent; biographer Nicholas Pegg believes they are taken from an entirely different source. Nevertheless, Ryan Dombal of Pitchfork argues that the two share the same theme–"humans will always resort to a language of savagery when necessary, no matter where or when." Bowie himself only released one public statement on the song: "If Vorticists wrote Rock Music it might have sounded like this." (Note: Vorticism, a partial response in Britain to Futurism, had occupied Bowie's mind at the time. O'Leary writes that Vorticism ideals were present on The Next Day (2013), while the Vorticist magazine Blast was in his personal "Top 100 Books" list. O'Leary also notes that The Cave of the Golden Calf, a Vorticist cabaret club in the early 1910s, is in the background of the album cover for Bowie's 1972 album The Rise and Fall of Ziggy Stardust and the Spiders from Mars.)

O'Leary writes that the song has a "steady rhythmic" beat that is counteracted by Bowie's saxophone and piano. Regarding the bass part, Jason Lindner stated: "Compositionally the bass part has more of a rhythmic and less of a harmonic function. It remains pretty much the same through the harmonic changes, with a couple of notes shifting to complement the progression." Bowie's vocal performance is subdued while he plays a "continuo figure" on saxophone. Stephen Dalton of Classic Rock magazine writes that the song has "a propulsive, roaring, heavily electronic wall of sound." Mojo critic Andrew Male described the track as "a raucous five-minute mesh of melody and discord, an art-rock anti-war romance, gasping under the pack-ice of no-wave sax-squawk." The magazine listed it as Bowie's 38th best track in 2015.

"'Tis a Pity She Was a Whore" was released on 17 November 2014 by Parlophone as the B-side of the single "Sue (Or in a Season of Crime)", with the catalogue number 10RDB2014. A press release accompanying the B-side stated, "The song acknowledges the shocking rawness of the First World War".

== Blackstar version ==
"'Tis a Pity She Was a Whore"

Song by David Bowie

from the album Blackstar
- Released: 8 January 2016
- Recorded: 5 January; 20 & 22 April 2015
- Studio: The Magic Shop and Human Worldwide in New York City
- Genre: Art rock
- Length: 4:52
- Label: ISO; Columbia; Sony
- Songwriter: David Bowie
- Producers: David Bowie; Tony Visconti

Blackstar track listing
- 7 tracks: 1. "Blackstar"; 2. "'Tis a Pity She Was a Whore"; 3. "Lazarus"; 4. "Sue (Or in a Season of Crime)"; 5. "Girl Loves Me"; 6. "Dollar Days"; 7. "I Can't Give Everything Away"

=== Recording ===
Before the sessions for what would be his final studio album Blackstar began, Bowie sent his home demo of "'Tis a Pity She Was a Whore" to saxophonist Donny McCaslin. McCaslin, who worked with Bowie on the original version of "Sue (Or in a Season of Crime)", recalled, "I sat there in stunned silence for a while," after hearing it. After hiring McCaslin's jazz quartet — pianist Jason Lindner, bassist Tim Lefebvre and drummer Mark Guiliana — as the backing band for the sessions, Bowie sent the demo to the remaining musicians in preparation for the sessions. Both "'Tis a Pity She Was a Whore" and its A-side "Sue" were re-recorded for Blackstar.

The remake of "'Tis a Pity She Was a Whore" was one of the first tracks recorded for the album. The backing track was recorded on 5 January 2015 at the Magic Shop in New York City. McCaslin recalled: "When we got together that first week, David said he wanted to re-record [it]. We were playing hard, going for it. That just happened in like ten minutes. That might have been the first take." McCaslin recorded additional saxophone overdubs months later. Like most of the vocal tracks, Bowie recorded his vocals at Human Worldwide Studios in New York City on 20 and 22 April 2015.

=== Composition ===
For the re-recording, Bowie took inspiration from McCaslin's 2012 album Casting for Gravity; Lefebvre stated: "usually it's the other way around – you research the guy who hired you." According to McCaslin, Bowie said, "he imagined the solo section as being something like 'Alpha and Omega', which is the Boards of Canada track we covered, or maybe talk about the intensity we have on 'Praia Grande'." Biographer Chris O'Leary notes that in McCaslin's cover of "Alpha and Omega", McCaslin, whose multitrack plays a "looped, phased melodic theme" over fluctuations played by Guiliana and Lefebvre; "Praia Grande" builds "to a maximalist sax solo full of waggled bass notes, surfing over waves of drums and synths."

Regarding the drum part, Guiliana stated: "The groove on the demo was a driving one-bar loop. The challenge was to play this repetitive part but stay in the moment and keep pushing the intensity." Guiliana overdubbed a Roland SPD-SX "full of 808 sounds", which appear prominently in the mix around the 3:33 mark. The remake opens with two intakes of breath, which O'Leary compares to "a man readying himself to walk up another flight of stairs".

Commentators have characterised the song's beat as similar to hip hop. Chris Gerard of PopMatters finds Bowie's vocals reminiscent of the Lodger track "DJ". Andy Gill of The Independent describes the re-recordings of both "'Tis" and "Sue" as "frantic, bustling whirls of avant-garde, banshee sax improvisation and drumming"; he compares Bowie's vocal performance and lyrics to his 1976 track "Station to Station".

=== Release and reception ===
The re-recording of "'Tis a Pity She Was a Whore" was released on 8 January 2016 as the second track on Bowie's final album Blackstar, sequenced between the title track and "Lazarus". Bowie died two days after its release, after having suffered from cancer for 18 months.

The re-recording of "'Tis a Pity She Was a Whore" has received positive reviews from music critics, with many highlighting the performance of the backing band. Gerard praised the remake as "far more fully developed" than the 2014 original, giving particular attention to the backing band. He writes that the band "infuses Blackstar with a restless anxiety that is particularly evident on ''Tis a Pity She Was a Whore'," calling the final track "maddening and thrilling". Alexis Petridis of The Guardian similarly praised the band's "synergy" on the track, while positively comparing Bowie's vocal performance to the "exploratory, barely contained chaos" of "'Heroes'" and "Scary Monsters (And Super Creeps)" or the "tumultuous, wildly distorted version" seen on "Panic in Detroit" and "Cracked Actor". O'Leary has praised the track as "a latter-life masterpiece, with no top and no bottom."

Both versions of "'Tis a Pity She Was a Whore" were included on the box set I Can't Give Everything Away (2002–2016), released in 2025.

== Personnel ==
According to biographer Chris O'Leary:

Original version

- David Bowie – vocals, guitar, tenor saxophone, piano, synthesiser, keyboards, drum machine

Blackstar version

- David Bowie – lead and backing vocal
- Donny McCaslin – tenor saxophone
- Jason Lindner – piano, keyboards
- Tim Lefebvre – bass
- Mark Guiliana – drums, Roland SPD-SX
- Erin Tonkon – backing vocal

== Charts ==
Chart performance for "'Tis a Pity She Was a Whore"
Chart (2014–16)	Peak position
Belgium (Ultratip Bubbling Under Flanders)	78
Ireland (IRMA)	92
Netherlands (Single Top 100)	68
Portugal (AFP)	57
Sweden (Sverigetopplistan)	63
UK Singles (Official Charts Company)	107
US Hot Rock & Alternative Songs (Billboard)	34

== Release history ==
Release history for "'Tis a Pity She Was a Whore"
Region	Date	Format(s)	Label	Catalogue no.
Europe	17 November 2014	10-inch (B-side)	Parlophone	10RDB2014
United States	28 November 2014	10-inch (B-side)	Columbia	88875028701
