= Dollar Days =

Song by David Bowie

from the album Blackstar
- Released: 8 January 2016
- Recorded: 2015
- Studio: Magic Shop, New York City; Human Worldwide, New York City
- Genre: Art rock; jazz-rock; folk rock
- Length: 4:44
- Label: ISO
- Songwriter(s): David Bowie
- Producer(s): David Bowie; Tony Visconti

Blackstar track listing
- 7 tracks: 1. "Blackstar"; 2. "'Tis a Pity She Was a Whore"; 3. "Lazarus"; 4. "Sue (Or in a Season of Crime)"; 5. "Girl Loves Me"; 6. "Dollar Days"; 7. "I Can't Give Everything Away"

"Dollar Days" is a song by English musician David Bowie. It is the sixth track on Bowie's twenty-sixth and final studio album, Blackstar, which was released on 8 January 2016. The track was written by Bowie, and it was produced by Bowie and Tony Visconti. "Dollar Days" charted in multiple countries, including Bowie's home country of the United Kingdom, in which the song peaked at number 138.

== Composition ==
"Dollar Days" was recorded without having a demo created for it prior. According to Donny McCaslin, who provided saxophone parts for Blackstar, "One day, David just picked up a guitar ... he had this little idea, and we just learned it right there in the studio."

== Critical reception ==
"Dollar Days" received positive reception from critics. Mike Powell of Pitchfork separately reviewed the song and labeled it their "Best New Track", comparing it to Bowie's older hits "Five Years" and "Ashes to Ashes". Jody Rosen of Billboard labeled the song as "lovely" with a lyrical combination of "delicacy and clatter".

== Charts ==
Chart (2016)	Peak position
France (SNEP)	148
Netherlands (Single Top 100)	90
Portugal (AFP)	68
Sweden (Sverigetopplistan)	98
Switzerland (Schweizer Hitparade)	46
UK Singles (Official Charts Company)	138
Hungarian Singles	22
US Hot Rock & Alternative Songs (Billboard)	41
