= Jan Houllevigue =

Jan Houllevigue (born 1962, in Briançon) is a French-Norwegian artist, photographer and production designer. He is best known for his collaborations with Johan Renck, and is a recipient of 2014 BIFA award. Houllevigue was the recipient of the 2016 VMA award for his work on the David Bowie's "Black Star" video.
