= Girl Loves Me =

Song composed and performed by David Bowie

Song by David Bowie

from the album Blackstar
- Released: 8 January 2016
- Recorded: 2015
- Studio: Magic Shop, New York City; Human Worldwide, New York City
- Genre: Art rock; experimental rock; jazz rock
- Length: 4:51
- Label: ISO
- Songwriter(s): David Bowie
- Producer(s): David Bowie; Tony Visconti

Blackstar track listing
- 7 tracks: 1. "Blackstar"; 2. "'Tis a Pity She Was a Whore"; 3. "Lazarus"; 4. "Sue (Or in a Season of Crime)"; 5. "Girl Loves Me"; 6. "Dollar Days"; 7. "I Can't Give Everything Away"

"Girl Loves Me" is a song by English musician David Bowie. It is the fifth track on Bowie's twenty-sixth and final studio album, Blackstar, released on 8 January 2016, Bowie's birthday and two days before his death. The track was written by Bowie and produced by Bowie and Tony Visconti. "Girl Loves Me" peaked at number 87 on the Dutch Top 100 and number 146 on the UK Singles Chart.

== Composition ==
"Girl Loves Me" is notable for its usage of Polari and Nadsat in its lyrics, the latter of which is a fictional slang created by Anthony Burgess which was used very often in his 1962 novel A Clockwork Orange.

== Critical reception ==
Rolling Stone calls "Girl Loves Me" their favourite moment from Blackstar, labelling it as "dark, trippy and sexy in ways only the late, great icon could pull off." NME labels the song as a "menacing, militaristic tattoo," and suggests that Bowie was possibly influenced by rappers Future and Young Thug on the song.

== Charts ==
"Girls Loves Me" chart performance
Chart (2016)	Peak position
Netherlands (Single Top 100)	87
Portugal (AFP)	70
Sweden Heatseeker (Sverigetopplistan)	2
UK Singles (Official Charts Company)	146
US Hot Rock & Alternative Songs (Billboard)	40
