= 2006 Mojo Awards =

British music awards ceremony

The 2006 Mojo Honours List.

== Nominees ==
Complete list of nominees (winners in bold):

- Best New Act - presented to an act who have made a significant impact over the last 18 months
  - **Corinne Bailey Rae**
  - Guillemots
  - Amadou & Mariam
  - Teddy Thompson
  - Archie Bronson Outfit
  - The Raconteurs
- Inspiration Award - presented to an act that has been the catalyst for music fans and fellow musicians alike
  - Sparks
  - Johnny Cash
  - **Buzzcocks**
  - Paul Weller
  - The Fall
- Mojo Icon - the recipient of this award has enjoyed a spectacular career on a global scale
  - David Bowie
  - **Scott Walker**
  - Johnny Cash
  - Neil Young
  - Van Morrison
- Catalogue Release of the Year - presented to the reissue that is both definitive and beautifully packaged
  - **Johnny Cash - Legend**
  - Talking Heads - Reissue Series
  - Orange Juice - The Glasgow School
  - Various - Anthems in Eden
  - Various - Strangely Strange But Oddly Normal
  - Jeff Wayne - War of the Worlds
- Vision Award - presented to the best music DVD package of the year in recognition of visual innovation and impact
  - Kraftwerk - Minimum-Maximum
  - Bob Dylan - No Direction Home
  - Ramones - The Story of the Ramones
  - DiG!
  - **Flaming Lips - Fearless Freaks**
  - The Mayor of Sunset Strip
- Songwriter Award - presented to an artist whose career has been defined by their ability to consistently pen classic material
  - Joe Strummer
  - Richard Hawley
  - Kate Bush
  - **Chrissie Hynde**
  - Nick Cave
- Classic Album - presented by Mojo to an artist responsible for a landmark release in the history of rock
  - **Tago Mago by Can**
- Roots Award
  - **Dan Penn & Spooner Oldham**
- Hero Award
  - **Prince Buster**
- Lifetime Achievement Award
  - **David Gilmour**
- Merit Award
  - **Bert Jansch**
- Hall of Fame - presented by Mojo to an act or solo star who is best described as "an artists' artist"
  - **Elton John**
- Les Paul Award - presented to a visionary performer on the guitar
  - **Brian May**
- Mojo Medal
  - **Jools Holland**
- Maverick Award
  - **The Jesus & Mary Chain**
