= I Can't Give Everything Away =

Song by David Bowie

Single by David Bowie

from the album Blackstar
- Released: 6 April 2016
- Recorded: 2015
- Studio: Magic Shop, New York City; Human Worldwide, New York City
- Genre: Art pop; alternative dance; jazz
- Length: 5:47 (album version); 4:26 (video edit)
- Label: ISO; RCA
- Songwriter: David Bowie
- Producers: David Bowie; Tony Visconti

Blackstar track listing
- 7 tracks: 1. "Blackstar"; 2. "'Tis a Pity She Was a Whore"; 3. "Lazarus"; 4. "Sue (Or in a Season of Crime)"; 5. "Girl Loves Me"; 6. "Dollar Days"; 7. "I Can't Give Everything Away"

"I Can't Give Everything Away" is a song by English musician David Bowie. It is the seventh and final track on his twenty-sixth and final studio album, Blackstar (2016), and was released posthumously as the album's third and final single on 6 April 2016. The track was written by David Bowie and was produced by both him and Tony Visconti.

Prior to issue as a posthumous single, "I Can't Give Everything Away" peaked at number 45 on the Swiss Hitparade chart; number 141 on the UK Singles Chart; and number 142 on the French Singles Chart.

The song contains a harmonica part and rhythm intended to parallel "A New Career in a New Town", an instrumental from Bowie's 1977 album Low which closed the first side of the album; this was noted in reviews of Blackstar.

== Critical reception ==
"I Can't Give Everything Away" received positive reviews from critics. Sam Richards of NME called the song "a serene, lilting number", while Ben Skipper of the IB Times labelled it as a "beautiful and moving farewell". Neil McCormick of The Telegraph called the song an "epic closing track", commenting that "Bowie sounds like he is grappling with his own mystery: 'Seeing more and feeling less / Saying no but meaning yes / This is all I ever meant / That's the message that I sent.'"

The American online magazine Pitchfork listed "I Can't Give Everything Away" at number 23 on their ranking of the 100 best songs to be released in 2016.

== Music video ==
On 6 April 2016 an animated lyric video was released, created by Jonathan Barnbrook, who also designed the album's artwork. He explained his motives behind the video as follows:

“This is really a very simple little video that I wanted to be ultimately positive,” Barnbrook says. “We start off in the black and white world of Blackstar, but in the final chorus we move to brilliant colour, I saw it as a celebration of David, to say that despite the adversity we face, the difficult things that happen such as David’s passing, that human beings are naturally positive, they look forward and can take the good from the past and use it as something to help with the present. We are a naturally optimistic species and we celebrate the good that we are given.”

"I Can't Give Everything Away" impacted radio worldwide and was playlisted at BBC Radio 2, BBC 6 Music, Absolute and Radio X in the UK.

== Farewell Mix ==
A reworked version of the song, known as "I Can't Give Everything Away (Farewell Mix)", was performed by industrial rock band Nine Inch Nails, with whom Bowie had collaborated and toured on occasions, during their I Can't Seem To Wake Up tour. Singer Trent Reznor stated he made the remix as a healing factor to cope with Bowie's death. Reznor had anonymously uploaded a studio version of the remix to SoundCloud several months before performing it live. The studio version features only Bowie's vocals; while performing the song live, Reznor sings along with Bowie's vocals.

== Covers ==
American indie rock band Spoon released a cover of the song on Jan 8, 2023, on what would have been Bowie's 76th birthday.

== Charts ==
Chart (2016)	Peak position
Belgium (Ultratip Bubbling Under Flanders)	37
France (SNEP)	142
Mexico Ingles Airplay (Billboard)	33
Portugal (AFP)	84
Sweden Heatseeker (Sverigetopplistan)	12
Switzerland (Schweizer Hitparade)	45
UK Singles (Official Charts Company)	141
US Hot Rock & Alternative Songs (Billboard)	39
