= Blackstar (song) =

2015 song by David Bowie

Single by David Bowie

from the album Blackstar
- Released: 19 November 2015
- Recorded: 2015
- Studio: Magic Shop, New York City; Human Worldwide, New York City
- Genre: Art rock; avant-garde jazz; jazztronica; electronic; progressive rock
- Length: 9:57
- Label: ISO; Columbia
- Songwriter: David Bowie
- Producers: David Bowie; Tony Visconti

Blackstar track listing
- 7 tracks: 1. "Blackstar"; 2. "'Tis a Pity She Was a Whore"; 3. "Lazarus"; 4. "Sue (Or in a Season of Crime)"; 5. "Girl Loves Me"; 6. "Dollar Days"; 7. "I Can't Give Everything Away"

Music video
- "Blackstar" on YouTube

"Blackstar" (stylised as "★") is a song by the English rock musician David Bowie. It was released as the lead single from his twenty-sixth and final studio album of the same name on 19 November 2015. "Blackstar" peaked at number 61 on the UK singles chart, number 70 on the French Singles Chart and number 78 on the Billboard Hot 100. "Blackstar" received both the Grammy Award for Best Rock Song and the Grammy Award for Best Rock Performance at the 59th Grammy Awards. At 9:57, it was the longest song to enter the Billboard Hot 100 charts, overtaking Harry Chapin's "A Better Place to Be (Live)", until Tool broke the record in 2019 with "Fear Inoculum".

== Production and composition ==
"Blackstar" is an art rock, avant-garde jazz, progressive rock, electronic, and baroque song. Also described as an "avant jazz sci-fi torch song", it features a "drum and bass rhythm, [a] two-note tonal melody with hints of Gregorian chant, [and] shifting time signatures". In the bluesy slow middle section, the song shifts from an acid house-inspired groove to a languid, R&B-flavored interlude.

Similarities have been drawn between Bowie's song and Elvis Presley's song "Black Star" which contains the lyrics "When a man sees his black star, he knows his time...has come." The repeated line "at the centre of it all" is also present in Bowie's 2002 single "Slow Burn" and appears to originate in Aleister Crowley's The Book of Lies.

The song was originally over eleven minutes long, but after learning that iTunes would not post singles over ten minutes in length, Bowie and Tony Visconti edited it down to 9:57, making it Bowie's second-longest track behind "Station to Station". Bowie did not want to confuse listeners by releasing different single and album versions.

Saxophonist Donny McCaslin said that Bowie had told him the song was about ISIL, although an official spokesperson for Bowie denied this.

== Release ==
"Blackstar" was released on 19 November 2015, as a digital download and in 2017 as a 12" single in Japan only. In addition to its release on the album of the same name, the track was used (in a different version) as the opening music for the television series The Last Panthers.

== Music video ==
The music video for "Blackstar" is a surreal ten-minute short film directed by Johan Renck (the director of The Last Panthers). It depicts a woman with a tail, played by Elisa Lasowski, discovering a dead astronaut and taking his jewel-encrusted skull to an ancient, otherworldly town. The astronaut's bones float toward a solar eclipse, while a circle of women perform a ritual with the skull in the town's centre.

Bowie in the music video

The film was shot in September 2015 in a film studio in Greenpoint, Brooklyn. The filmmaking process was highly collaborative, with Bowie making many suggestions and sending Renck sketches of ideas he wanted incorporated. While both men agreed to leave the video open to interpretation (Renck initially refused to confirm or deny that the astronaut in the video was Major Tom), Renck has offered several details regarding its meaning. Renck later said on a BBC documentary "to me, it was 100% Major Tom." It was Bowie who requested that the woman have a tail, his only explanation being "it's kind of sexual". Renck has speculated that Bowie may have been contemplating his own mortality and relevance to history while developing the video, but said that the crucified scarecrows were not intended as a messianic symbol. Renck has also stated that Bowie portrays three distinct characters in the video: the introverted, tormented, blind "Button Eyes"; the "flamboyant trickster" in the song's middle section; and the "priest guy" holding the book embossed with the "★" symbol.

The choreography, notably that of the three dancers featured in an attic sequence, was drawn from other media, including Max Fleischer's Popeye the Sailor cartoons. "[Bowie] sent me this old Popeye clip on YouTube and said, 'Look at these guys.' When a character is not active, when they’re inactive in these cartoons, they’re sort of created by these two or three frames that are loops so it looks like they’re just standing there, wobbling. It’s typical in those days of animation and stop-motion, you would do that to create life in something that was inactive. So we wanted to see if we could do something like this in the form of dance, we had to do that." The female dancer in the attic sequence also performs a signature movement from the "Fashion" music video.

The sets in the film were designed by Jan Houllevigue and painted by Roman Turovsky. The official video for "Blackstar" won the Best Art Direction award at the 2016 MTV Video Music Awards.

== Critical reception ==
Ryan Dombal of Pitchfork praised "Blackstar", giving it the site's "Best New Track" designation. He described the song as "wonderfully odd and expansive" and noted that it is "closer to the cocaine-fueled fantasias of 1976's Station to Station than almost anything [Bowie has] done since". Pitchfork named "Blackstar" the 11th best music video of 2015.

Simon Critchley commented on Bowie's connection to Elvis Presley, referring to the lyrics of Presley's song "Black Star" as a clue. In the annual Village Voice's Pazz & Jop mass critics poll of the year's best in music in 2016, "Blackstar" was tied at number 9, with Rihanna's "Work".

== Track listing ==
Digital download
No.	Title	Length
1.	"Blackstar"	9:57

=== Japan 12" single ===
Side one
No.	Title	Length
1.	"Blackstar"	9:57

Side two
No.	Title	Length
1.	"Lazarus" (radio edit)	4:05
2.	"I Can't Give Everything Away" (radio edit)	4:25

== Personnel ==
Personnel adapted from Blackstar liner notes.

Musicians

- David Bowie – vocals, acoustic guitar, mixing, production, string arrangements
- Tim Lefebvre – bass guitar
- Mark Guiliana – drums, percussion
- Donny McCaslin – flute, saxophone, woodwinds
- Ben Monder – electric guitar
- Jason Lindner – piano, organ, keyboards

Technical

- Tony Visconti – production, strings, engineering, mixing engineer
- Joe LaPorta – mastering engineer
- Kevin Killen – engineering
- Erin Tonkon – assistant engineer
- Joe Visciano – assistant engineer
- Kabir Hermon – assistant engineer
- Tom Elmhirst – mixing engineer

== Charts ==
Chart (2015–16)	Peak position
Austria (Ö3 Austria Top 40)	69
Belgium (Ultratop Flanders)	84
Belgium (Ultratop Wallonia)	37
Canada Hot 100 (Billboard)	53
France (SNEP)	45
Germany (Official German Charts)	97
Hungary (Single Top 40)	16
Ireland (IRMA)	62
Italy (FIMI)	31
Japan Hot 100 (Billboard)	55
Japan Hot Overseas (Billboard)	8
Netherlands (Single Top 100)	44
Portugal (AFP)	5
Spain (PROMUSICAE)	84
Sweden (Sverigetopplistan)	50
Switzerland (Swiss Hitparade)	20
UK Singles (OCC)	61
US Billboard Hot 100	78
US Hot Rock & Alternative Songs (Billboard)	13

== Release history ==
Region	Date	Format	Label
United States	19 November 2015	Digital download	ISO; Columbia
Italy	19 November 2015	Contemporary hit radio	Columbia
