= Sue (Or in a Season of Crime) =

2014 song by David Bowie

Single by David Bowie

from the album Nothing Has Changed
- B-side: "'Tis a Pity She Was a Whore"
- Released: 17 November 2014
- Recorded: 24 July 2014
- Studio: Avatar (New York, New York)
- Genre: Experimental jazz
- Length: 7:24
- Label: Parlophone; Columbia; Legacy
- Composers: Paul Bateman; Bob Bhamra; David Bowie; Maria Schneider
- Lyricist: David Bowie
- Producers: David Bowie; Tony Visconti

David Bowie singles chronology
"Love Is Lost (Hello Steve Reich Mix by James Murphy for the DFA)" (2013)	"Sue (Or in a Season of Crime)" / "'Tis a Pity She Was a Whore" (2014)	"Blackstar" (2015)

Music video
- "Sue (Or in a Season of Crime)" on YouTube

"Sue (Or in a Season of Crime)" is a song by the English musician David Bowie released on 17 November 2014 as the lead single from the 2014 compilation album Nothing Has Changed. Co-produced by Bowie and longtime collaborator Tony Visconti, the song originated after the two saw bandleader and composer Maria Schneider perform with her orchestra in May 2014. They began collaborating on Bowie's first major project since The Next Day (2013). Following workshop sessions in mid-June, the track was recorded officially at Avatar Studios in New York on 24 July 2014, with contributions from Schneider's orchestra.

Although he had experimented with jazz earlier in his career, "Sue" marked Bowie's first explorations into experimental jazz. Musically, the song contains an array of instrumentation and is driven by a brass and flute motif. Saxophonist Donny McCaslin provided the solos. Inspired by the writings of poet Robert Browning, the lyrics of "Sue" are open-ended, depicting the fall of a marriage. Premiered in October 2014, the song garnered positive reviews from music critics, but some felt its inclusion on a compilation album downplayed the track. A music video directed by Tom Hingston promoted it.

Bowie re-recorded both "Sue" and its B-side, "'Tis a Pity She Was a Whore" for his twenty-sixth and final studio album, Blackstar (2016). The new version features players from the original, including McCaslin, drummer Mark Guiliana and guitarist Ben Monder, along with pianist Jason Lindner, bassist Tim Lefebvre and James Murphy of LCD Soundsystem on percussion. The remake is more stripped down than the original, featuring a harder, punchier sound influenced by drum'n'bass, while Bowie's vocals are more subdued. Many critics have praised the remake as superior to the original recording.

== Background ==
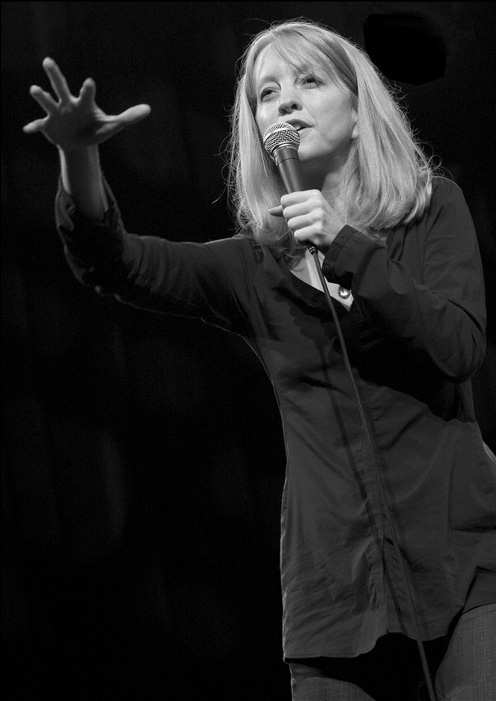
Bowie collaborated with bandleader Maria Schneider (pictured in 2008) for "Sue".

On 8 May 2014, David Bowie and longtime collaborator Tony Visconti visited the Birdland club in Manhattan to see the bandleader and composer Maria Schneider perform with her orchestra. The two were, in Visconti's words, "totally floored by the beauty and power of her music". Bowie contacted her shortly afterwards, hoping to collaborate on a new song; it would be his first major project since The Next Day (2013). Beginning with a home demo, Bowie and Schneider began work on the track in mid-late May. Of the process, Schneider stated: "I sat at the piano there in front of him and played around with harmony a bit, and I then said, 'maybe I can imagine doing something with this.' I experimented on my own for a couple weeks before we again met and started working collaboratively based on those ideas."

At Schneider's insistence, Bowie travelled to the 55 Bar, a jazz club in New York on 1 June, to see an experimental quartet featuring saxophonist Donny McCaslin and drummer Mark Guiliana. Ten days later, Bowie emailed McCaslin, inviting him and Guiliana to collaborate on the new track. McCaslin gracefully accepted, later saying, "I tried not to think about it too much. I just wanted to stay in the moment and do the work".

== Recording ==
=== Workshop sessions ===
Initial workshop sessions for "Sue" began at Euphoria Studios in Manhattan in mid-June. Schneider wanted Bowie's thoughts on the composition's direction and structure before official recording began. Along with McCaslin, Guiliana, trombonist Ryan Keberle and bassist Jay Anderson, Schneider recruited avant-jazz guitarist Ben Monder, an occasional member of her orchestra. Monder told Yahoo! Music in 2016, "I had not played with Maria for a while prior to this project ... But she said she could hear my sound for that particular track, so David met with me and Donny." Monder thought highly of Bowie: "We just had one rehearsal for the Maria Schneider session and he was very down-to-earth, very nice. He seemed to make an effort to make you feel like you weren't in the presence of a rock deity."

According to Visconti, who co-produced the track with Bowie, Schneider and the core members of her band "jammed to the bass line for several hours ... over the course of three long sessions in a rehearsal studio". Schneider told biographer Chris O'Leary that the initial workshop version of the track was "very different". She initially had the players improvise over an E major chord, but felt it was "too much", and changed it to a "B section" for Bowie, which allowed him to continue to revise the lyrics up to the final recording. The rhythms began to form and Bowie found his lyrics after a few more sessions. After the final workshop session, Bowie and Schneider met to finalise the arrangement and structure.

=== Final session ===
"Sue" was officially recorded on 24 July 2014 at Avatar Studios in New York; Bowie had intended to use the Magic Stop, the studio where he had recorded The Next Day, but it proved too small for the 17-person orchestra. Bowie handed out his lyrics to the musicians at the start of the session; the track's title was revealed on the music sheets. The song's arrangement provided the musicians with a substantial amount of freedom during the session. Guiliana later recalled: "Aside from David and Maria's overall direction, the chart I was playing from was quite minimal ... More of a guide, rather than a specific notation."

During the session, Schneider instructed the musicians to improvise around Bowie's vocals. McCaslin and Keberle contributed multiple solos throughout the session; Visconti used McCaslin for most of the final recording, with Keberle's work appearing, according to O'Leary, "in the out-of-time section after 'Suuuue...goodbye!'" According to biographer Nicholas Pegg, besides Guiliana, Monder, Anderson, Keberle and McCaslin, the remaining orchestra members who played on the recording were: Jesse Han (flute, alto flute, bass flute); David Pietro (alto flute, clarinet, soprano saxophone); Rich Perry (tenor saxophone); Scott Robinson (clarinet, bass clarinet, contrabass clarinet); Tony Kadleck, Greg Gisbert, Augie Haas, Mike Rodriguez (trumpet, flugelhorn); Keith O'Quinn, Marshall Gilkes (trombone); George Flynn (bass trombone, contrabass trombone); [and] Frank Kimbrough (piano).

=== Liver cancer diagnosis ===
Based on the timeline given at the time of Bowie's death in January 2016, Bowie was diagnosed with liver cancer around the time of these recording sessions. Bowie began chemotherapy treatment for cancer, but he kept his diagnosis from his fellow musicians, who later said that they did not know he was sick while recording with him.

== Composition ==
=== Lyrics ===
"Sue"'s open-ended lyrics depict the fall of a marriage in eight verses. At the start, he got the job (an echo of The Next Day Extra track "The Informer"), they will get the house. However, things go awry when the narrator says that Sue is ill, the clinic called and the "X-ray's fine". Sue's motif throughout the song is the four-note phrase played by the brass and flute sections, and sung by Bowie in the first two verses. As the track continues, the narrator's accusations begin, which leads the motif to change throughout.

Eventually, the narrator accuses Sue of betrayal ("I found your note that you wrote last night / It can't be right you went with him") and murders her ("I pushed you down beneath the weeds"), kisses her corpse and says goodbye. Following her murder, the narrator finds a note that tells the whole story ("you went with that clown"). Bowie starts the last verse "Sue, I never dreamed", which was the title of the first song he ever recorded, with his first band the Kon-Rads in 1963. Pegg credits the writings of poet Robert Browning, specifically "Porphyria's Lover" and "My Last Duchess", as inspiration for the lyrics.

=== Music ===
"Sue (Or in a Season of Crime)" (2014)
Although he had explored jazz on prior releases, "Sue" features Bowie's first explorations into experimental jazz.

"Sue" is Bowie's first exploration into experimental jazz. Although he had experimented with jazz on Black Tie White Noise and The Buddha of Suburbia (both 1993), he used rock and R&B musicians primarily rather than true jazz musicians. Other reviewers have suggested the track has elements of jazz-pop and post-industrial music. Regarding the track, Visconti stated, "This is truly modern jazz. They don't play bebop, there's nothing traditional about them."

Over seven minutes in length, the song features an array of varied instrumentation, some of which complement Bowie's vocals while some counteract him. O'Leary describes the array of instruments as "jostling factions — instruments in loose confederations that soon break apart, moving at different tempos". The bass line played by Keberle borrows heavily from Plastic Soul's 1997 single "Brand New Heavy", which earned that song's writers, Paul Bateman and Bob Bhamra, co-writing credits on "Sue" with Bowie and Schneider. McCaslin's playing is prevalent throughout the track, often emphasising the lyrics. In the closing section, his saxophone takes center stage, with the remaining orchestra playing around him. Both Bowie and Visconti praised McCaslin's saxophone contributions, with the latter telling Mojo: "It's one of the most soulful saxophone solos David and I have ever heard ... It always made us weep, especially the end part. He's such a passionate player."

== Release ==
BBC Radio 6 Music presenter Guy Garvey premiered "Sue (Or in a Season of Crime)" on 12 October 2014. According to O'Leary, reception was mixed. Parlophone released "Sue" as a 10-inch single, with the catalogue number 1ORDB2014, and as a digital download on 17 November 2014 in the United Kingdom and 28 November 2014 in the United States. "Sue" was also included on the compilation album Nothing Has Changed, released on the same day. Kory Grow of Rolling Stone praised the track as "captivating", calling it a fitting addition to Bowie's catalogue. In The Guardian, Alexis Petridis gave the track a positive review, saying it was an indication that Bowie is not afraid to continue experimenting in new genres. He felt it was more of a "statement" than a song, after the "superior but relatively straightforward rock [The Next Day]". He was, however, critical of the song's inclusion on Nothing Has Changed, writing this makes it appear as an "afterthought". Michael Rancic of Exclaim! agreed, feeling its inclusion on the compilation "downplayed' the track.

Alongside the full 7:24 version, the single included the B-side "'Tis a Pity She Was a Whore" and a radio edit of "Sue", with a length of 4:01. This single edit, which contains only six verses instead of eight, is accompanied by a monochrome music video directed by Tom Hingston, who previously created a short clip for The Next Day track "I'd Rather Be High". Shot in London, the video features clips of Bowie performing in a studio alongside the orchestra that were filmed during the July session by Jimmy Miller. Concurrently, lyrics are projected onto a wall while a silhouetted figure weaves in and out of lamplights on a darkened street. Pegg describes the video as "a noirish assemblage with echoes of The Third Man".

At the 58th Annual Grammy Awards in February 2016, Schneider won the Grammy Award for Best Arrangement, Instrumental and Vocals for her work on "Sue (Or in a Season of Crime)".

== Track listing ==
- Parlophone – 1ORDB2014

Side A
No.	Title	Writer(s)	Length
1.	"Sue (Or in a Season of Crime)"	Paul Bateman; Bob Bhamra; David Bowie; Maria Schneider	7:24

Side B
No.	Title	Writer(s)	Length
1.	"'Tis a Pity She Was a Whore"	Bowie	5:27
2.	"Sue (Or in a Season of Crime)" (Radio edit)	Bateman; Bhamra; Bowie; Schneider	4:01

== Blackstar version ==
"Sue (Or in a Season of Crime)"

Song by David Bowie

from the album Blackstar
- Released: 8 January 2016
- Recorded: 2 February, 23 & 30 April 2015
- Studio: The Magic Shop and Human Worldwide (New York City)
- Genre: Art rock; jazz-rock; drum and bass
- Length: 4:40
- Label: ISO; Columbia; Sony
- Composers: Paul Bateman; Bob Bhamra; David Bowie; Maria Schneider
- Lyricist: David Bowie
- Producers: David Bowie; Tony Visconti

Blackstar track listing
- 7 tracks: 1. "Blackstar"; 2. "'Tis a Pity She Was a Whore"; 3. "Lazarus"; 4. "Sue (Or in a Season of Crime)"; 5. "Girl Loves Me"; 6. "Dollar Days"; 7. "I Can't Give Everything Away"

=== Recording ===
During the sessions for what would be his final studio album Blackstar (2016), Bowie decided to re-record "Sue" from scratch, using the core backing band of McCaslin, Guiliana, pianist Jason Lindner and bassist Tim Lefebvre. Monder provided additional guitar overdubs, while James Murphy of LCD Soundsystem played percussion; his work on Arcade Fire's Reflektor inspired Bowie to create a remix of "Love Is Lost" for The Next Day Extra. The original song's B-side, "'Tis a Pity She Was a Whore", was also re-recorded during the sessions for Blackstar.

Called "Re-Sue" in Bowie's handwritten notes for the album, the new version was recorded on 2 February 2015 at the Magic Shop in New York, using the original as a template. According to Visconti, Bowie wanted to remake "Sue" to "make a different version of it, with a completely different flavour". Lindner said the band attempted a "quartet arrangement" of the original, but found little success. Another attempt, using solely drums, bass and vocals, was recorded but quickly rejected. McCaslin said later: "The new version of 'Sue' took the longest because the original we recorded with Maria is so specific, with all the orchestration." He then decided to strip Schneider's score down to saxophone, clarinet and alto flute, which would become the basis of the new version. Bowie recorded his vocals on 23 and 30 April 2015 at Human Worldwide Studios in New York.

According to Guiliana, Bowie instructed the band to "really go for it" during the recording. Lefebvre recalled Bowie and Visconti "gave us eight bars to just rage. Mark and I had played a lot of live drum'n'bass together, and it's shocking and amazing to hear that on a David Bowie record. They allowed us to do what we do." This section happens following the sixth verse, at the 3:07 mark. Pegg describes this part of the track as reminiscent of Bowie's 1997 album Earthling.

=== Composition ===
Guiliana described the re-recorded version of "Sue" as "stripped down" and "a little faster" than the original. In Bowie's handwritten notes for the track, he emphasised "strong bass". To compensate, Lefebvre used multiple pedals throughout the song, including a Pork Loin pedal, an Octave pedal and a Corona pedal. Towards the ending he plays what he called "EDM kind of stuff", utilising his bass's top strings. Monder plays in a similar manner as he did on the original. While he initially doubles Lefebvre's bass line, he then uses a hybrid Stratocaster and his 1982 Ibanez AS-50 to create reverb throughout. With two Wurlitzer organs, Lindner replaces the horns and woodwinds from the original, along with further reverb. Compared to the original, Bowie and McCaslin are less prominent on the re-recording. Bowie's singing is more subdued, containing "less vibrato" and "more nuance". He sings the eight verses of the original at a much faster pace. O'Leary writes McCaslin performs "a wasp-like buzzing after the first verse .. introducing the 'Sue' motif on clarinet at 2:02".

Many commentators have noted the remake's drastically different feel from the original recording. Pegg describes the re-recording as "a harder, punchier attack, driven by Guiliana's relentless drums, a brilliant, stammering bass line from Tim Lefebvre, and a series of atmospheric guitar overdubs from Ben Monder". Similarly, Chris Gerard of PopMatters noted the "edgier groove" and overall "heavier vibe". Stephen Dalton of Louder writes that the re-recording "feels sharper, denser and heavier", with added funk rock guitar lines and "percussive shudders". NME's Sam Richards noted the drum'n'bass rhythm and how the overall vibe seemed to match the lyrics' "murderous intent". In Rolling Stone, David Fricke describes the re-recording as having a "dynamic honing" take on the original, featuring "more malevolent programming". Ben Rayner of the Toronto Sun calls the remake a "flailing, relentless tumult" that is "rougher-hewn [and] heavier" than the original. Rancic writes the track "sounds 'jazzy'", but its "loose structure" doesn't have any real qualities of jazz evident.

=== Release and reception ===
The re-recording of "Sue" was released on 8 January 2016 as the fourth track on Bowie's final album Blackstar, sequenced between "Lazarus" and "Girl Loves Me". Bowie died two days after its release, after having suffered from liver cancer for 18 months. In his review of Blackstar, Andy Gill of The Independent described the remakes of both "Sue" and its B-side "'Tis a Pity She Was a Whore" as "like footnotes to the transitional experiments of 'Station to Station', but with less potent melodies, and less interest in pleasing forms". Petridis praised the remake over the original, writing, "It sounds like a band, rather than Bowie grafting himself on to someone else's musical vision." Rancic writes that while the original was downplayed by its inclusion on a compilation album, the remake provides "the actual left turn that The Next Day announced", in that it showed the artist was still "creatively unpredictable". Barry Walters of NPR praised Guiliana's drum performance on the track, writing, "[he] skewers jungle's hyper funk with irregular beats and accents that emphasise ensemble performance, not studio-sampled perfection". Rayner praised the remake as superior to the original, complementing the rhythm section and the performances of McCaslin and Bowie.

Both versions of "Sue (Or in a Season of Crime)" were included on the box set I Can't Give Everything Away (2002–2016), released in 2025.

== Personnel ==
=== Original version ===
Personnel adapted from Bowie's official website.

- David Bowie – vocals
- Mark Guiliana – drums

Maria Schneider orchestra

- Maria Schneider – arranger, conductor
- Jesse Han – flute, alto flute, bass flute
- David Pietro – alto flute, clarinet, soprano sax
- Rich Perry – tenor sax
- Donny McCaslin – soprano sax, tenor sax
- Scott Robinson – clarinet, bass clarinet, contrabass clarinet
- Tony Kadleck – trumpet, fluegelhorn
- Greg Gisbert – trumpet, fluegelhorn
- Augie Haas – trumpet, fluegelhorn
- Mike Rodriguez – trumpet, fluegelhorn
- Ryan Keberle – trombone
- Keith O'Quinn – trombone
- Marshall Gilkes – trombone
- George Flynn – bass trombone, contrabass trombone
- Ben Monder – guitar
- Frank Kimbrough – piano
- Jay Anderson – bass

=== Blackstar version ===
Personnel per biographer Chris O'Leary:

- David Bowie – vocals
- Mark Guiliana – drums
- Donny McCaslin – tenor sax, clarinet, alto flute
- Ben Monder – guitar
- Jason Lindner – Wurlitzer organ, keyboards
- Tim Lefebvre – bass
- James Murphy – percussion

== Charts ==
Chart performance for "Sue (Or in a Season of Crime)"
Chart (2014–16)	Peak position
France (SNEP)	52
Hungary (Single Top 40)	13
Italy (FIMI)	73
Netherlands (Single Top 100)	83
Portugal (AFP)	69
Sweden (Sverigetopplistan)	96
Switzerland (Schweizer Hitparade)	54
UK Singles (Official Charts)	81
US Hot Rock & Alternative Songs (Billboard)	43
