= Blackstar (album) =

- CD and digital edition

Studio album by David Bowie
- Released: 8 January 2016
- Recorded: January–May 2015
- Studios: Magic Shop (New York City); Human Worldwide (New York City)
- Genres: Art rock; jazz rock; experimental jazz; experimental rock
- Length: 41:14
- Languages: English; Nadsat (Note: on "Girl Loves Me"); Polari
- Labels: ISO; Columbia; Sony
- Producers: David Bowie; Tony Visconti

David Bowie chronology
Five Years (1969–1973) (2015)	Blackstar (2016)	Who Can I Be Now? (1974–1976) (2016)

Singles from Blackstar
- 1. "Blackstar" Released: 19 November 2015; 2. "Lazarus" Released: 17 December 2015; 3. "I Can't Give Everything Away" Released: 6 April 2016

Blackstar (stylised as ★) is the twenty-sixth and final studio album by the English musician David Bowie. Released on 8 January 2016, Bowie's 69th birthday, the album was recorded in secret in New York City with his longtime co-producer Tony Visconti and a group of local jazz musicians: Donny McCaslin (saxophone), Jason Lindner (piano), Tim Lefebvre (bass) and Mark Guiliana (drums). Ben Monder and James Murphy contributed additional guitar and percussion, respectively. The album contains "Lazarus", from the 2015 musical of the same name, and re-recorded versions of the 2014 songs "Sue (Or in a Season of Crime)" and "'Tis a Pity She Was a Whore".

More experimental than its predecessor The Next Day (2013), Blackstar combines atmospheric art rock with various styles of jazz. Bowie took inspiration from artists including Kendrick Lamar and Death Grips, listening to them during the album's production. The album's lyrics feature themes of death, with many songs being told from the perspective of the dead or dying. The cover art, designed by Jonathan Barnbrook, features a large black star with five star segments at the bottom that spell out the word Bowie.

The album was preceded by the singles "Blackstar" and "Lazarus", both of which were supported by music videos. Two days after its release, Bowie died following a private 18-month battle with liver cancer; Visconti described the album as a parting gift for his fans after his death. Upon release, the album was met with commercial success, topping charts in many countries, including the United Kingdom, following Bowie's death, and became his only album to top the Billboard 200 in the United States. It was the fifth-best-selling album of the year worldwide.

Blackstar received widespread acclaim as Bowie's most musically challenging album in decades, with critics praising the music, themes and performances of the backing band. It received three Grammy Awards and the Brit Award for British Album of the Year in 2017. It was listed as one of the best albums of 2016 and later of the 2010s decade by numerous publications. The work was re-analysed following Bowie's death, with critics and fans reinterpreting its lyrics, title and artwork as hinting at the artist's demise. Blackstar has since been described by publications and commentators as one of Bowie's best albums, a perfect farewell to his fans, and one of the best final albums ever.

== Background ==
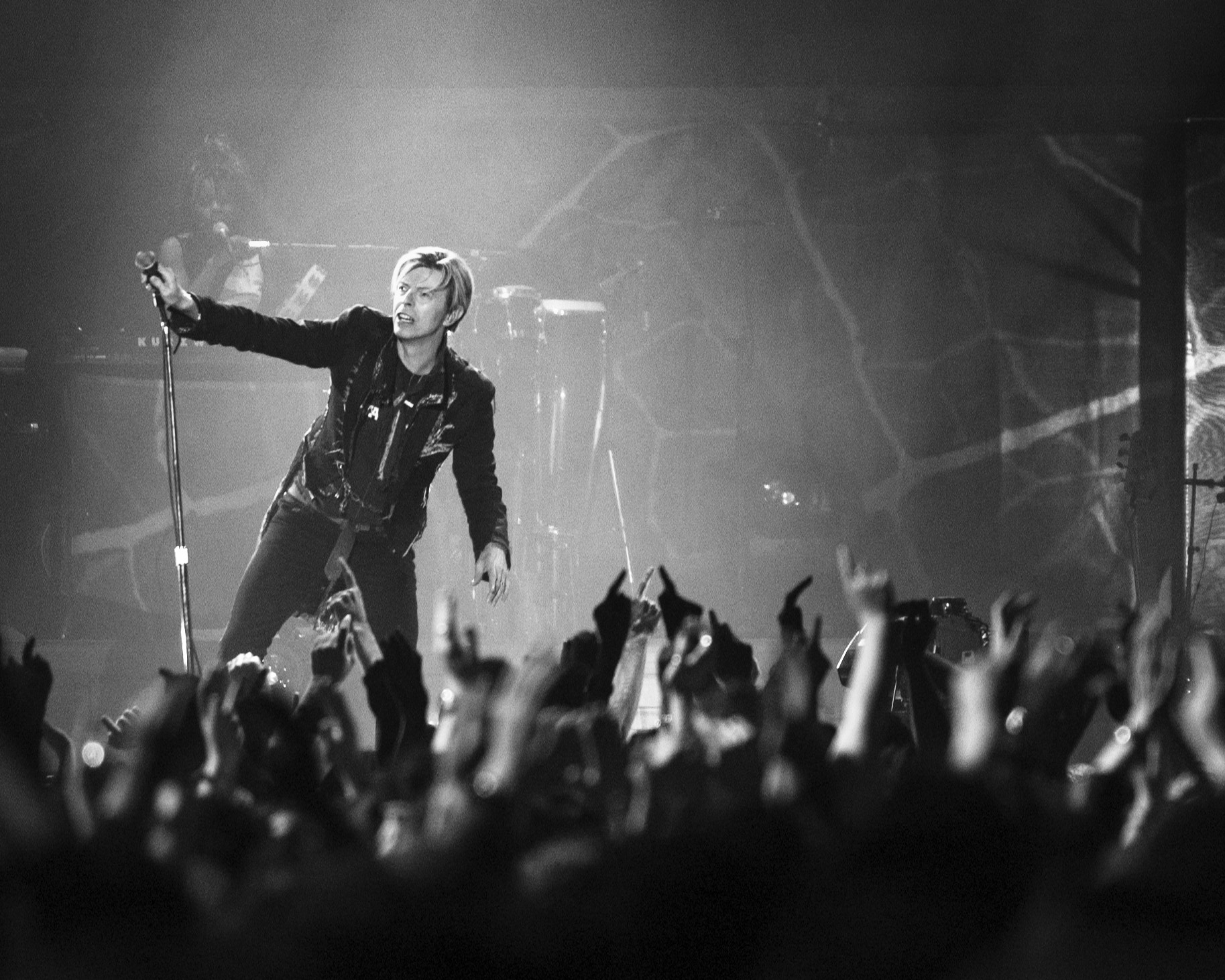
Bowie performing in 2003 on the A Reality Tour, his final concert tour

David Bowie released his twenty-fifth studio album The Next Day in March 2013. It was his first studio release in ten years after retreating from the public view in 2004. A critical and commercial success, it topped the album charts in twenty countries, including the United Kingdom, and gave Bowie his highest chart placement ever in the United States at number two. The successes of The Next Day and the David Bowie Is exhibition, which opened in London the same year, prompted Bowie to be more active in the studio throughout 2014. Between May and July 2014, Bowie collaborated with the bandleader and composer Maria Schneider on the experimental jazz song "Sue (Or in a Season of Crime)". It features Schneider's orchestra and an ensemble including the saxophonist Donny McCaslin and the drummer Mark Guiliana. The song was released as a single in November and appeared on the compilation album Nothing Has Changed (2014).

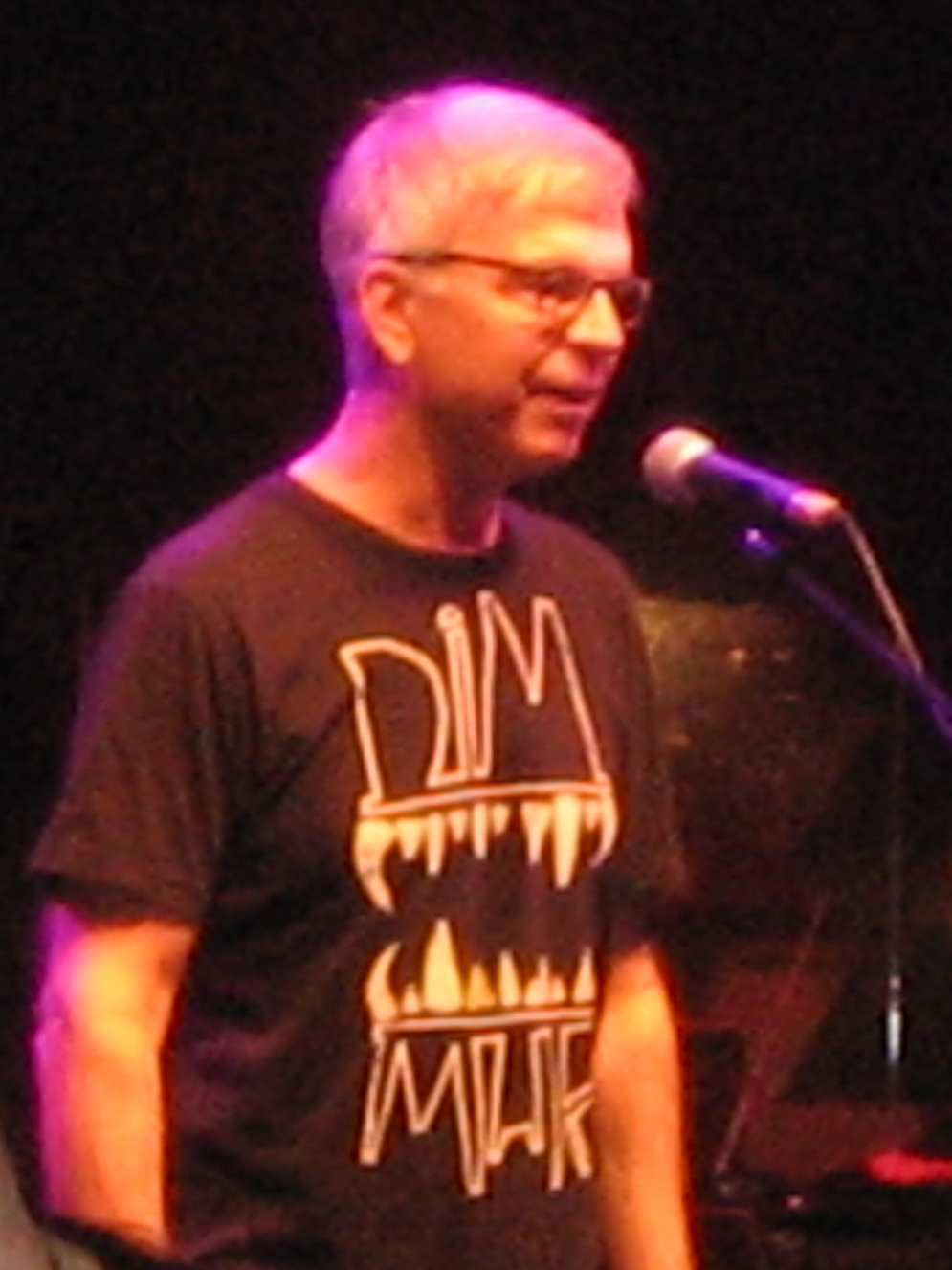
Bowie's longtime producer Tony Visconti (pictured in 2007) co-produced Blackstar

In June 2014, Bowie demoed new songs with his longtime producer Tony Visconti, the drummer Zachary Alford and the pianist Jack Spann at the Magic Shop in New York City, where The Next Day was recorded. Throughout the summer, Bowie worked on the demos alone for several months. During this time, he recorded "'Tis a Pity She Was a Whore" as a home demo, which appeared as the B-side of "Sue" in November. The same year, Bowie began writing a musical, Lazarus, with the Irish playwright Enda Walsh, composing new songs for it such as "No Plan", "When I Met You", "Killing a Little Time" and "The Hunger" (later titled "Lazarus").

In June, Bowie and Visconti saw McCaslin play with his jazz quartet — Guiliana, the pianist Jason Lindner and the bassist Tim Lefebvre — at the 55 Bar club in Greenwich Village, New York City. Lefebvre recalled: "When David saw us, he heard how electric and aggressive we were – more than he anticipated – which really sold us to him." Towards the end of 2014, Bowie hired the quartet as the main backing band for the upcoming album. Apart from Visconti, Blackstar was the first time since Tin Machine (1989) that Bowie used a completely new set of musicians than from his previous album. Visconti told Mojo: "If we'd used [Bowie's] former musicians they would be rock people playing jazz ... Having jazz guys play rock music turns it upside down." In December, the musicians received demos from Bowie in preparation for the recording sessions at the start of the new year.

== Recording ==
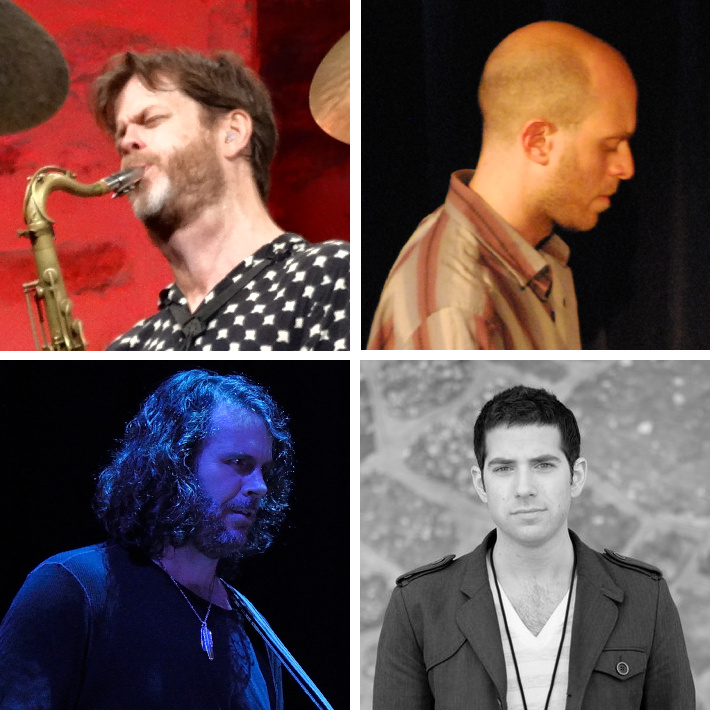
The backing band on Blackstar. Clockwise from top left: Donny McCaslin (2017), Jason Lindner (2009), Mark Guiliana (2011), Tim Lefebvre (2014)

Like The Next Day, recording for Blackstar took place in secret at the Magic Shop and Human Worldwide Studios in New York City, with production co-handled by Bowie and Visconti. Each musician signed confidentiality clauses relating to the album.

The studio atmosphere was collaborative. Bowie had demoed all of the tracks before the sessions, but encouraged experimentation amongst the ensemble. Lindner told Rolling Stone, "He gave us the freedom to really just play, sort of be ourselves, and if we were hearing anything in particular, to try it out." McCaslin later described the process as supportive and praised the working environment as creative. Lefebvre appreciated that Bowie chose a band with studio chemistry rather than using a random set of studio musicians, stating that they "all already knew how to play together" so Bowie did not have to "establish a groove" because "it was already there". Visconti praised the band, calling their approach to music "refreshing".

Recording began at the Magic Shop in the first week of 2015. Tracks for both Blackstar and the Lazarus musical were recorded: "Lazarus", "No Plan", a re-recording of "'Tis a Pity She Was a Whore" and "When I Met You". Most of the rhythm tracks were recorded in one or two takes. During the week, Bowie celebrated his 68th birthday. Following the January sessions, further recording commenced in blocks; according to the biographer Nicholas Pegg, they lasted four to six days each, taking place in the first week of February and the third week of March. Bowie emailed the musicians demos before each session.

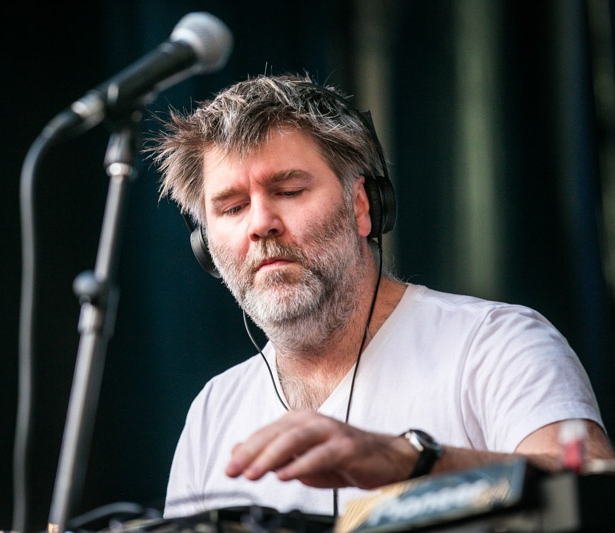
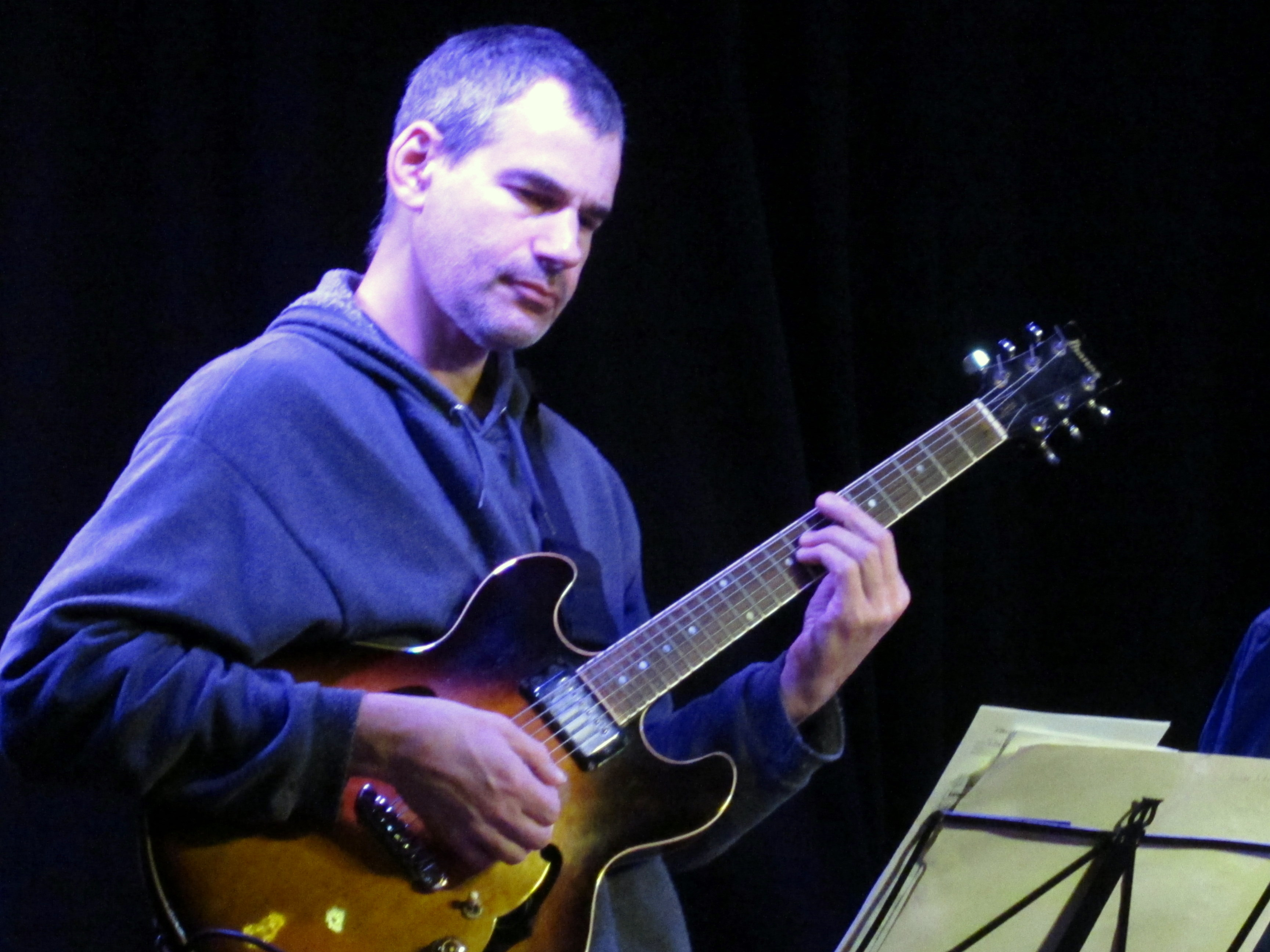
The latter Blackstar sessions saw the addition of James Murphy (left, in 2013) on percussion and Ben Monder (right, in 2011) on guitar.

The February sessions yielded "Dollar Days", "Girl Loves Me", "Someday" and a re-recording of "Sue (Or in a Season of Crime)". "Dollar Days" was created without a preliminary demo, instead being devised on the spot in the studio based on a guitar idea from Bowie. Visconti said Bowie wanted to remake "Sue" to "make a different version of it, with a completely different flavour". James Murphy of LCD Soundsystem was present during these sessions, contributing percussion on "Sue" and "Girl Loves Me"; he had previously remixed Bowie's song "Love Is Lost" for The Next Day Extra in 2013. Murphy had been slated to co-produce Blackstar but backed out due to feeling "overwhelmed". (Note: Guiliana said that Murphy had other projects he was already committed to.)

For the March sessions, the band were joined by the jazz guitarist Ben Monder, who played on the original recording of "Sue". Monder found the environment to be positive, saying that Bowie respected their ideas and contributions. Songs recorded included "Blackstar", "I Can't Give Everything Away", "Killing a Little Time" and a remake of "Someday" (now titled "Blaze"). Bowie performed his vocals live while the band played during the Magic Shop sessions, but moved to Human Worldwide Studios in April for proper recording. The majority of his vocals were recorded from scratch between April and May, although some vocals from the Magic Shop sessions were kept, including part of "I Can't Give Everything Away" and the full vocal for "No Plan". Visconti's assistant at Human Worldwide, Erin Tonkon, contributed backing vocals to "'Tis a Pity She Was a Whore". (Note: Tonkon had previously contributed backing vocals to The Next Day Extra track "Atomica".)

The final master mix was done by the English engineer Tom Elmhirst at Electric Lady Studios in New York City, although Bowie and Visconti oversaw the mixing sessions in general. Bowie wanted Elmhirst because "he's the number one mixing engineer in the US". The album was finished by June, after which Bowie continued preparations for the Lazarus musical.

=== Bowie's illness ===
Bowie recorded Blackstar while suffering from liver cancer. He had been diagnosed in the summer of 2014 and was undergoing chemotherapy treatments by the time the sessions began in January 2015. He kept the illness private, only discussing it when it affected his work; Visconti did not learn of it until Bowie arrived at the studio immediately following a chemo session. Visconti recalled that despite his illness, Bowie was in high spirits throughout the sessions: "He was so brave and courageous ... and his energy was still incredible for a man who had cancer. He never showed any fear. He was just all business about making the album."

Visconti reportedly told the backing band that Bowie was unwell, although Lefebvre said that he never appeared sick. According to Pegg, Bowie's illness showed signs of remission as the sessions continued. By March, his hair had grown back, and he looked well. Monder, during his time in the studio, recalled that Bowie looked healthy and showed no signs of illness. He recalled Bowie being "really enthusiastic" and "very excited" to be making an album again. Throughout 2015, Bowie was optimistic as he continued chemotherapy and, by that summer, was in remission. By November, however, shortly after completing the "Lazarus" music video, Bowie told Visconti the cancer had returned, and his condition was terminal.

== Music and lyrics ==
The music on Blackstar has been characterised as incorporating art rock, experimental jazz, free jazz, progressive rock and experimental rock, with elements of industrial rock, folk-pop and hip-hop. (Note: See specific sources for attribution: art rock; jazz; experimental jazz; free jazz; progressive rock; experimental rock; elements of industrial rock, folk-pop and hip hop.) Several critics acknowledged the album as Bowie's most experimental in years. In The New York Times, Jon Pareles wrote that the band "jams [their] way into rock, funk and electronics from a jazz perspective". Billboard's Jody Rosen argued that "to call this album jazz is as wrong as it would be to call it art rock, or funk, or electronica – though all of those styles and more are stirred into the mix." Blackstar was not the first time Bowie experimented with jazz. He was an avid jazz listener in his youth, having been exposed to the genre by his older half-brother Terry Burns, and had occasionally worked with jazz musicians in the past. (Note: These included the avant-jazz pianist Mike Garson from 1973's "Aladdin Sane" to 2003's "Bring Me the Disco King"; the drummer Joey Baron, who played on Outside (1995); and the trumpeter Lester Bowie, who played throughout Black Tie White Noise (1993). David Bowie had also played jazzy saxophone parts on Low's "Subterraneans" (1977) and on The Buddha of Suburbia's "South Horizon" (1993).) Monder said that there were many musical references to Bowie's past on Blackstar, albeit "presented in a fresh context".

According to Visconti, he and Bowie deliberately attempted "to avoid rock'n'roll" while making the album. They listened to the rapper Kendrick Lamar's To Pimp a Butterfly, released midway through the Blackstar recording sessions, and cited it as an influence. Visconti said, "We wound up with nothing like that, but we loved the fact that Kendrick was so open-minded and he didn't do a straight-up hip-hop record. He threw everything on there, and that's exactly what we wanted to do." Another record that influenced Bowie was D'Angelo's Black Messiah (2014). According to Pegg, it featured a fusion of soul, jazz and funk that was reminiscent of Bowie's work on "Sue". The electronic duo Boards of Canada and experimental hip hop trio Death Grips have also been cited as influences. The record also drew comparisons to the music of Scott Walker.

Blackstar features themes of death throughout. The songs contain narrators and characters who offer different perspectives, and many of the songs are told from the perspective of the dead or dying. The A.V. Club's Ignatiy Vishnevetsky writes that "these are spiritual, criminal and psychosexual underworlds of the pulp imagination", with stories about acts of supernatural transformation ("Blackstar", "Lazarus"), rejected men, violence and murder ("'Tis a Pity She Was a Whore", "Sue") and delinquents ("Girl Loves Me"). Vishnevetsky continues: "Blackstar uses music as staging and scenery, placing [Bowie's] dynamic voice in the context of noir atmosphere." Uncut's Michael Bonner argued that the album has an unclear "thematic thread" due to the seven tracks originating from different sources.

=== Songs ===
The album's title track incorporates nu jazz and free jazz, while progressing through a drum and bass-style rhythm, an acid house-inspired portion of the instrumental, a saxophone solo and a lower-tempo blues-like section. At ten minutes in length, it originally began as two separate melodies before being merged to one single piece. Chris Gerard of PopMatters compared the song's scope and length to Bowie's 1976 song "Station to Station". In an interview with Rolling Stone, McCaslin claimed the song was "about ISIS", although Bowie's spokesperson denied this claim. Gerard noted that the idea of the black star has numerous meanings in the ideologies of the occult, alchemy, astrology, mythology and philosophy.

The re-recording of "'Tis a Pity She Was a Whore" features a hip hop beat and free-form sax, unlike the original recording, which was described by Classic Rock magazine's Stephen Dalton as "a propulsive, roaring, heavily electronic wall of sound". Bowie's vocals are also less subdued and more sociable. Its title was derived from 'Tis Pity She's a Whore, a 1600s play by the English dramatist John Ford.

"Lazarus"
"Lazarus" displays elements of jazz. Its lyrics, relating to death, were interpreted by fans and critics as an admission of Bowie's failing health.

"Lazarus" is described by Pegg as "an intense, brooding threnody", with a groove compared by NME's Sam Richards to latter-day Massive Attack. Sung from the perspective of Thomas Jerome Newton, the alien played by Bowie in the 1976 film The Man Who Fell to Earth, the narrator is living in solitude in New York City, reflecting on a lifetime of lavish living. He is in a purgatorial state, with The Independent's Andy Gill describing the use of "fog-like sax swirls" emphasising his "fugitive presence". He carries the struggles of a man out of time, marked by scars and self-inflicted wounds, and feels a need to break free from the unknown. Some critics felt the track begins to drag across its six-minute runtime.

Compared to the original version of "Sue (Or in a Season of Crime)", which featured brass-heavy instrumentation and a bebop-jazz arrangement, the remake has a heavier, denser and "edgier groove", with added funk rock guitar lines and "percussive shudders". Writing for The Guardian, Alexis Petridis wrote that the remake feels more complete than the original, which he believed "felt like a statement rather than a song": "[The remake] sounds like a band, rather than Bowie grafting himself onto someone else's musical vision." Paste's Robert Ham compared Guiliana's drumming on the "Sue" remake to the drum and bass stylings of Bowie's 1997 album Earthling. The lyrics are ambiguous as to whether it is a farewell or a murder confession.

"Girl Loves Me" features synthesisers, "acrobatic" drumming, strings and "bouncing" bass. The song includes Nadsat, a fictional language created by Anthony Burgess for his novel A Clockwork Orange (1962), (Note: Bowie had previously referenced Stanley Kubrick's 1971 film adaptation of A Clockwork Orange in the 1972 song "Suffragette City", and in the costuming and pre-show music of the Ziggy Stardust Tour (1972–1973).) and Polari, a type of slang used commonly by British gay men during the mid-20th century. The refrain, "Where the fuck did Monday go?", was interpreted by Pegg as the kind of desperation from a man who knows his time is running out. Bonner compared the fragmented lyrics to the cut-up techniques Bowie utilised on the albums Diamond Dogs (1974) and Outside (1995).

"Dollar Days" is a ballad that contains a sax solo and a lush arrangement; (Note: See sources for attribution: ballad; a sax solo and a lush arrangement.) Dalton considers it reminiscent of Bowie's work on Young Americans (1975). The lyrics suggest a desire to challenge expectations and possibly deceive ("I'm dying to / Push their backs against the grain / And fool them all again and again"). Pareles noted the deceptive way Bowie challenges his listeners by either adopting a new persona or being genuine. Briefly touching on regret before moving past it, the narrator describes feelings of unease as he is unlikely to find peace and solitude in the English countryside.

The final track, "I Can't Give Everything Away", is built on "pulsing synthesisers" and "tightly-wound percussion". Bowie plays a harmonica solo similar to the one from Low's "A New Career in a New Town" (1977). The scholar Leah Kardos believed that the harmonica motif signified "transition and frontiersmanship". Another scholar, Alice Masterson, noted that both "I Can't Give Everything Away" and "A New Career in a New Town" contain themes of "moving from one state of being to another". Rolling Stone's David Fricke compared Monder's guitar playing to that of Robert Fripp's on "Heroes" (1977); the song features the album's only guitar solo. Neil McCormick of The Daily Telegraph thought of the song as a point where "Bowie sounds like he is grappling with his own mystery", with the line "Seeing more and feeling less / Saying no but meaning yes / This is all I ever meant / That's the message that I sent". Pegg and Girard describes the song, like a lot of Bowie's previous works, as one that lacks a definitive interpretation, instead letting the listener interpret it for themselves.

== Artwork and packaging ==
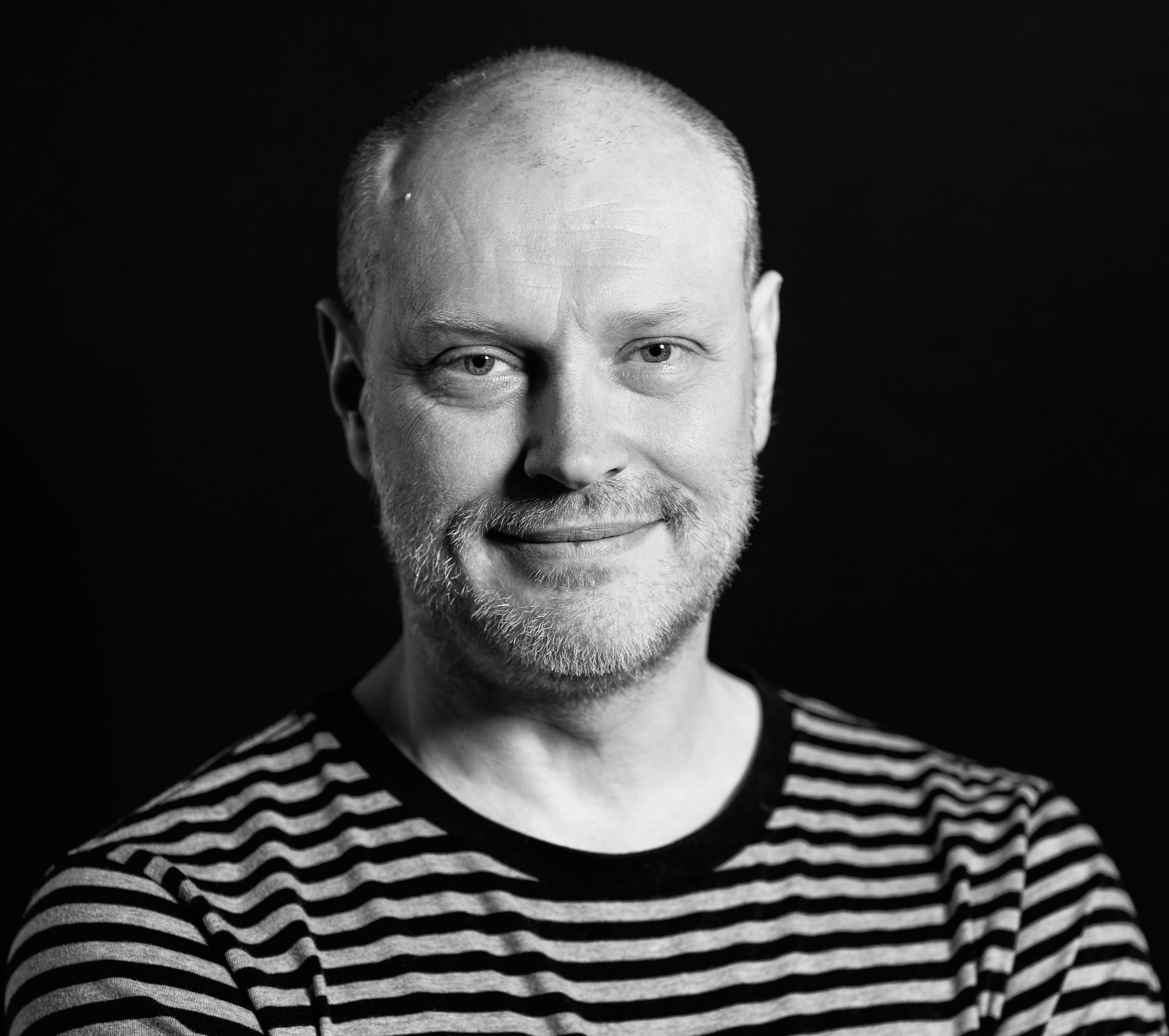
Jonathan Barnbrook (pictured in 2016) designed the album's artwork.

The artwork for Blackstar was designed by Jonathan Barnbrook, who filled the same role on Heathen (2002), Reality (2003) and The Next Day. The cover depicts a five-pointed star: black on white for the CD edition and all-black with a cut-out star on the vinyl release, which revealed the grooves of the record beneath. Barnbrook explained that due to the vinyl revival, he "wanted to give it the feeling that it contained something quite threatening". On the vinyl release, with the LP removed, the black paper behind the cut-out reveals a hidden picture of a starfield when the foldout sleeve is held up to a light source. It took more than four months for fans to discover the effect. Both sleeves feature five star segments below the main star that form the word Bowie in stylised letters. The cover's star image is credited to NASA in the CD booklet. The sleeve was the only Bowie sleeve not to feature an image of the artist himself.

On the sleeve itself, the title of the album and song is stylised as the black star symbol ★, rather than the word "Blackstar". Barnbrook got the idea from a conversation with the writer William S. Burroughs and compared the use of the star symbol to Egyptian hieroglyphs and emojis. Barnbrook believed that the latter were becoming more common in everyday communication, with "people creating whole narratives out of them". By using a simple black star symbol, Barnbrook said that "it was a way of being minimal with the title as were we with the design and in doing so making it stand out from all of the other stuff you see around you". In November 2015, Barnbrook further said that the symbol "has a sort of finality, a darkness, a simplicity, which is a representation of the music".

On both the CD and vinyl releases, the lyrics and liner notes are displayed in a gloss-black finish on a matte-black background. Some resemble constellations or zodiac signs, and some are accompanied by graphics such as photographs taken on the "Blackstar" music video set by Jimmy King. One of these, an optical illusion grid, Barnbrook said "is about how matter affects space-time". The lyrics of "Girl Loves Me" are accompanied by the plaque that NASA originally attached to the Pioneer 10 and 11 space probes in the 1970s, depicting a man and a woman greeting extraterrestrial life which may intercept the probes. After Bowie's death, Barnbrook released the Blackstar design elements under a Creative Commons NonCommercial-ShareAlike license.

== Release ==
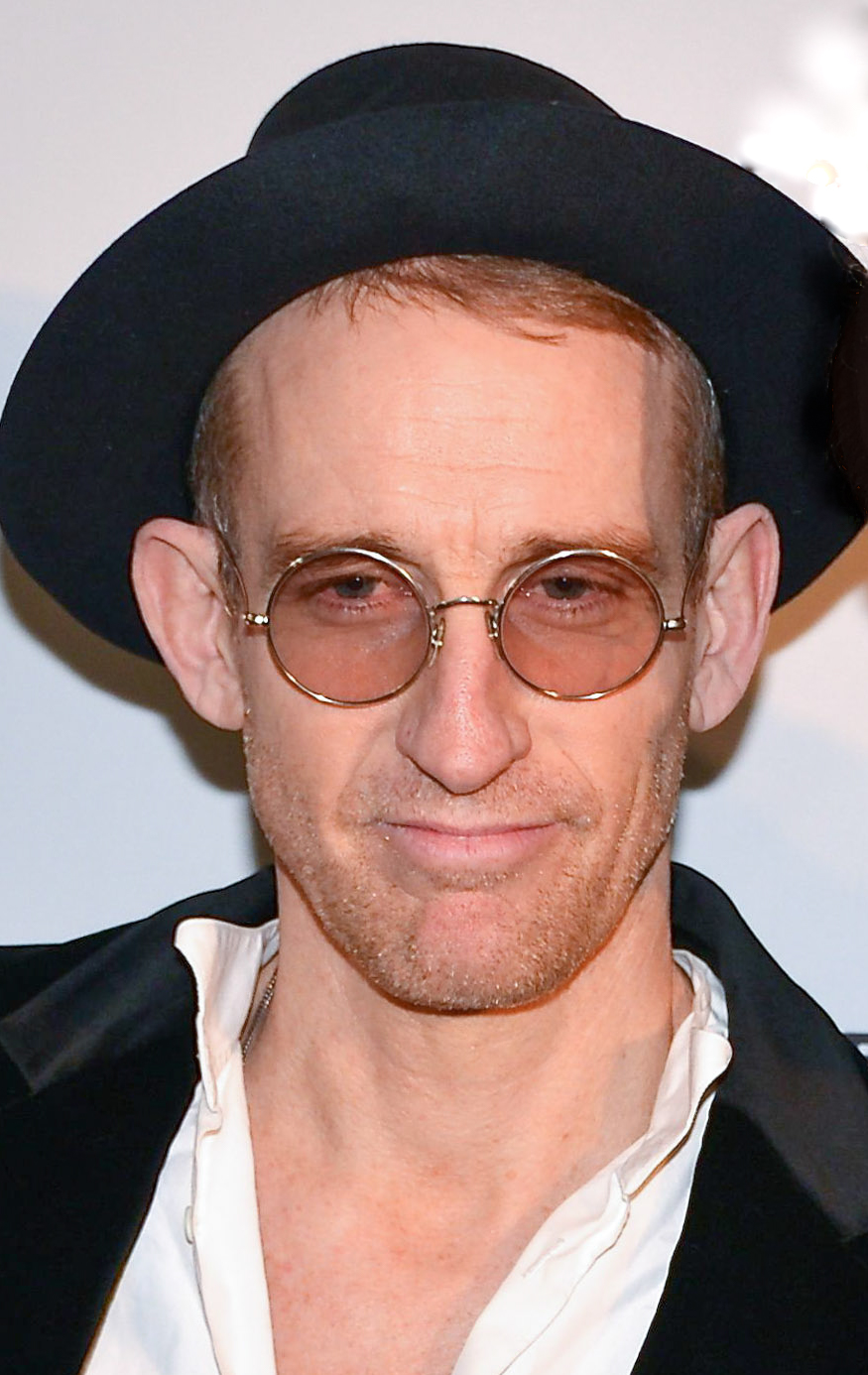
Johan Renck (pictured in 2013) directed the music videos for "Blackstar" and "Lazarus".

The title track was released as the album's lead single on 19 November 2015 and used as the opening music for the television series The Last Panthers. Its music video, shot in September 2015 at a Brooklyn studio, is a surreal ten-minute short film directed by The Last Panthers' director Johan Renck. It depicts a woman with a tail, played by Elisa Lasowski, discovering a dead astronaut and taking his jewel-encrusted skull to an ancient, otherworldly town. (Note: Renck interpreted the astronaut to be Major Tom, a character Bowie had revisited several times throughout his career.) The astronaut's bones float toward a solar eclipse, while a circle of women perform a ritual with the skull in the town's centre. The video introduced Bowie's new character Button Eyes, a figure with bandaged, button eyes. Bowie informed Renck of his failing health and wanted death to be, in Renck's words, "a third collaborator in [the] video". The short film won the award for Best Art Direction at the 2016 MTV Video Music Awards. Like The Next Day, Bowie conducted no interviews and made no public appearances to promote Blackstar or its singles.

The second single, "Lazarus", was released on 17 December 2015 as a digital download, and received its world premiere on BBC Radio 6 Music's Steve Lamacq Show the same day. The music video for "Lazarus", shot in November 2015 in a Brooklyn studio and again directed by Renck, was released on 7 January 2016, the day before the album's release. Presented in a 1:1 aspect ratio, it prominently features Bowie as the Button Eyes character lying on a deathbed. Renck described the video as a take on "the Biblical tale of Lazarus rising from the bed". The video received three nominations at the 2016 MTV Video Music Awards for Best Direction, Best Cinematography and Best Editing.

Originally intended for release on 30 October 2015, (Note: The album's release was delayed due to Bowie's rehearsals commitments for the Lazarus musical, and Blackstar's music videos (particularly "Lazarus") were not yet completed.) Blackstar was released on 8 January 2016, coinciding with Bowie's 69th birthday, through his ISO label, Columbia Records and Sony Music. Two days later on 10 January, Bowie died of liver cancer; his illness had not been revealed to the public until then. Promotion and marketing continued following his death. In February, a series of sixteen 15-second film clips, titled Unbound: A Blackstar InstaMiniSeries, were uploaded to Instagram and later YouTube. (Note: The clips were created by Carolynn Cecilia and Nikki Borges with Bowie's permission.) The clips were intended to provide the creative team's "own visual interpretations of the songs, with no limits or preconditions on [Bowie's] part". A third and final single, "I Can't Give Everything Away", was released posthumously on 6 April, accompanied by an animated video created by Barnbrook.

On 8 January 2017, what would have been Bowie's 70th birthday, "Lazarus" and the outtakes "No Plan", "Killing a Little Time" and "When I Met You" were released on an EP, No Plan. The three songs had appeared on the soundtrack album for the Lazarus musical in October 2016. In 2018, Jon Culshaw played Bowie in the BBC radio play The Final Take: Bowie in the Studio, an imagined account of Bowie as he works on Blackstar and looks back over his life. Blackstar and No Plan were included on the last instalment of Bowie's era box set series, I Can't Give Everything Away (2002–2016), which was released on 12 September 2025.

== Critical reception ==
Professional ratings
Aggregate scores
Source	Rating
AnyDecentMusic?	8.4/10
Metacritic	87/100
Review scores
Source	Rating
AllMusic	5/5 stars
The A.V. Club	A−
The Daily Telegraph	5/5 stars
Entertainment Weekly	A−
The Guardian	4/5 stars
The Independent	4/5 stars
NME	4/5
Pitchfork	8.5/10
Rolling Stone	4/5 stars
Spin	7/10

Blackstar was acclaimed by music critics and fans. On Metacritic, the album has an average score of 87 out of 100 based on 43 reviews, indicating "universal acclaim". Blackstar was described as Bowie's most unconventional album since Low (1977) and his most challenging record in years. Neil McCormick hailed Blackstar as an "extraordinary" album which "suggests that, like a modern day Lazarus of pop, Bowie is well and truly back from beyond". Jon Pareles wrote that the album is "at once emotive and cryptic, structured and spontaneous and, above all, willful, refusing to cater to the expectations of radio stations or fans". It was variously considered a career highlight and his best album since the 1970s.

Many praised Bowie for reinventing himself once again and for taking such a creative risk this late into his career. (Note: Attributed to multiple references:) Exclaim!'s writer Michael Rancic called Blackstar "a defining statement from someone who isn't interested in living in the past, but rather, for the first time in a while, waiting for everyone else to catch up". The A.V. Club's Ignatiy Vishnevetsky believed Blackstar found Bowie "pushing a fringe aesthetic he's only dallied with before", leading to a confidence he has not shown in "a long time". Blackstar was positively compared to The Next Day, with Q magazine's Tom Doyle describing Blackstar as "more concise" and "a far, far more intriguing" musical statement than The Next Day.

Critics commented on the album's music and themes, with several describing Blackstar as an "anti-pop" record and comparing it to Outside (1995). Billboard's Jody Rosen believed the record's sound is what "grips your attention" and is "as potent as any he has produced in quite some time". Chris Gerard of PopMatters believed that Blackstar would simultaneously fit "neatly" in Bowie's catalogue and stand on its own due to its "unique sound and vibe". He argued the album stands as a "lesson" for artists to continue to challenge themselves and explore new directions. Several critics felt the album contained enough themes and imagery that fans and critics could dissect for weeks or months following its release. Uncut's Michael Bonner argued it felt like "the beginning of a new Bowie phase".

The performances of the backing band received acclaim, (Note: Attributed to multiple references:) with critics believing they added "anxiety" and "intensity" to the songs. Mojo's Keith Cameron and Record Collector's Jamie Atkins argued that Blackstar would have been less successful had Bowie used his regular collaborators. The latter said that by playing with a group of jazz musicians with no background in traditional rock music, Bowie "managed to free himself from the weight of his own influence". In The Wall Street Journal, Jim Fusilli believed that, because of the band's "powerful" and "erudite" performances, Blackstar "emerges as an album to savour as well as admire". Other critics praised Bowie's vocal performances. Paste's Robert Ham felt the production made his voice sound "alien-like" and praised the emotion he was able to convey at this stage of his career.

Some critics were more lukewarm towards Blackstar. Writing for Slant Magazine, Jonathan Wroble described it as feeling "fractured" and its style lacking unity: "It presents a rare disconnect between Bowie the creator of the album and Bowie's creation on the album, like two doppelgangers convinced they're each the real thing." Wroble also found "the way the lyrics alternate between ambiguous introspection and dark whimsy" to be confusing. Jonathan Bernstein of American Songwriter found it hard to believe that, given the album's hodgepodge of sources, the final product turned out as "thrilling", "challenging" and "ambitious" as it did. Atkins further believed that the album's "intense" nature would alienate modern, commercial rock acts.

Following Bowie's death, Bryan Wawzenek of Ultimate Classic Rock ranked Blackstar as Bowie's twelfth-greatest album, describing it as a throwback to his Berlin Trilogy. Although he felt it wasn't as "accessible" as The Next Day, he considered it a "great companion piece" and "a fitting end to one of rock's most influential careers". In 2018, Consequence of Sound ranked the album as Bowie's eighth-greatest, with staff writer Lior Phillips writing: "This is one of Bowie's most dynamic outings and a courageous triggering of a second creative wind." In 2020, Classic Rock History ranked it as Bowie's ninth-greatest. The album was also included in the 2018 edition of Robert Dimery's book 1001 Albums You Must Hear Before You Die.

=== Accolades ===
Blackstar was named one of the best albums of 2016 by numerous publications. According to Metacritic, it was the most prominently ranked record of 2016. In The Village Voice's annual Pazz & Jop critics poll, Blackstar finished at number one in the voting for 2016's top album. At the 59th Annual Grammy Awards in 2017, the album won awards for Best Alternative Music Album, Best Recording Package and Best Engineered Album, Non-Classical. In addition, the title track won both Best Rock Song and Best Rock Performance. The album was nominated for the Top Rock Album award at the 2016 Billboard Music Awards, losing to Blurryface by Twenty One Pilots. Blackstar was later named as one of the greatest albums of the 2010s decade by numerous publications, including Billboard, Consequence of Sound, NME, Pitchfork, Rolling Stone, Slant Magazine and Stereogum.

Accolades for Blackstar
Publication	Accolade	Rank	Ref.
The A.V. Club	20 Best Albums of 2016	1	
Billboard	The 100 Greatest Albums of the 2010s	49	
Consequence of Sound	Top 50 Albums of 2016	3	
Consequence of Sound	The 100 Top Albums of the 2010s	17	
The Guardian	Best albums of 2016	3	
The Guardian	100 Best Albums of the 21st Century	24	
The Independent	Best Albums of 2016	17	
Mojo	The Best of 2016	1	
The New York Times	The Best Albums of 2016	2	
NME	NME's Albums of the Year 2016	6	
NME	The Best Albums of the Decade: The 2010s	13	
Pitchfork	The 50 Best Albums of 2016	4	
Pitchfork	The 200 Best Albums of the 2010s	37	
Q	Q's Top 50 Albums of the Year 2016	1	
Rolling Stone	50 Best Albums of 2016	2	
Rolling Stone	Readers' Poll: 10 Best Albums of 2016	1	
Rolling Stone	100 Best Albums of the 2010s	5	
Rolling Stone	250 Greatest Albums of the 21st century	24	
Slant Magazine	The 100 Best Albums of the 2010s	39	
Sputnikmusic	Staff's Top 50 Albums of 2016	1	

== Commercial performance ==
Blackstar was already on course to debut at number one on the UK Albums Chart prior to the announcement of Bowie's death on 10 January 2016, according to the Official Charts Company. The album debuted at number one after selling 146,000 copies in the first week (a week that saw four other Bowie albums in the Top 10 and a further seven in the Top 40, the latter equalling Elvis Presley's chart record) and became his tenth number one album in the UK. The album remained three weeks at number one, falling to number two behind another Bowie album, the compilation Best of Bowie (2002), which became the first-ever album to get to number one in the UK because of streaming. As of January 2018, the album has sold 446,000 copies in the United Kingdom. Bowie was the biggest-selling vinyl artist of 2016 in the UK, with five albums in the vinyl Top 30, including Blackstar as the number one vinyl album of the year. It sold twice as many copies as the previous year's winner, Adele's 25.

In the US, the album debuted at number one on the Billboard 200 chart dating 30 January 2016, moving 181,000 copies in its first week. Its number one debut was previously anticipated by Billboard, though its total sales exceeded expectations by 51,000 copies. The album topped the iTunes chart following Bowie's death, with Best of Bowie placing second. It was Bowie's first number one in the US and best weekly sales figure. It was the 14th best-selling album in the US in 2016, with 448,000 copies sold that year. Within days of the album's release, the online retailer Amazon temporarily sold out of both the CD and LP editions. After news of his death, some music stores in both the US and UK sold out of copies.

Blackstar also peaked at number one in 24 countries, number two in Greece and Mexico, number four in Hungary, and number five in Japan. It has since been certified Gold in Germany, New Zealand, Portugal, Spain, Sweden and the US, certified Platinum in Australia, Austria, Belgium, Canada, Denmark, Italy, the Netherlands, Poland, Switzerland and the UK, and 2× Platinum in France. According to the International Federation of the Phonographic Industry (IFPI), it was the fifth best-selling album of the year, worldwide. As of April 2017, Blackstar has sold more than 1,900,000 copies. It was also the eighth best-selling vinyl release between 2015 and 2025.

== Legacy ==
=== Intended follow-up ===
Bowie did not intend Blackstar to be his final album. Towards the end of 2015, he had begun writing new songs and recording home demos. On 7 December, the opening night of the Lazarus musical, Bowie informed the show's director, Ivo van Hove, that he wanted to start writing a second musical; the show was Bowie's final public appearance. In an interview with Rolling Stone, Visconti said that Bowie called him a week before his death stating he wanted to make another album. He had known his illness was terminal since November 2015, but believed he had more time left. In an email to the director Floria Sigismondi, (Note: Sigismondi had directed the music videos for Bowie's Earthling singles "Little Wonder" and "Dead Man Walking" (both 1997).) Bowie confirmed he had plans for both a Blackstar follow-up and a post-Lazarus play. According to O'Leary, "he wrote Blackstar as a hedge: this could be the last album, let's dress it as such, but I pray it's not going to be." When he realised that he did not have enough time, he sent farewell emails to some of his closest collaborators, including Brian Eno and Mike Garson, but, according to the author Alexander Larman, "the idea was not to make a grand farewell statement of any kind". McCaslin said that Bowie wanted to perform some of Blackstar's songs live with the band and continue recording new music with them.

=== Post-death analysis ===
To say that David Bowie's final album was coloured by his death two days after its release, and the revelation that he recorded it beneath the terminal shadow of cancer, would be an understatement. It was flooded by it. Few albums have ever been subjected to so much exegesis so quickly.

— Dorian Lynskey, The Guardian, 2016

Following Bowie's death two days after the album's release, Blackstar became an unexpected swan song for the artist, leading fans and journalists to reanalyse the album with a new context, searching for hidden messages Bowie may have left behind. Visconti described Blackstar as a "parting gift" for his fans. He later stated: "I think he thought if he was going to die, this would be a great way to go. This would be a great statement to make." Visconti referred to Blackstar as Bowie's magnum opus.

Several journalists wrote that Bowie's lyrics seem to address his impending death, with CNN's Brandon Griggs noting that the album "reveals a man who appears to be grappling with his own mortality". Jesse Kinos-Goodin of CBC Music felt the title track's lyrics — "Something happened on the day he died / Spirit rose a metre and stepped aside / somebody else took his place, and bravely cried, 'I'm a blackstar, I'm a blackstar'" — represented Bowie reflecting on his life and impending death. "Lazarus" has been described as poignant; the lines "Look up here, I'm in heaven / I've got scars that can't be seen" were particularly interpreted as an admission of his failing health, and appeared in many publications following Bowie's death. Pegg, O'Leary and Jude Rogers of The Guardian argued the line "don't believe for just one second I'm forgetting you / I'm trying to / I'm dying to" in "Dollar Days" could be interpreted as "I'm dying too". Jonze and Rogers also noted the mention of x-rays in "Sue". In a scholarly article, Alice Masterson analysed the harmonica motif of Low's "A New Career in a New Town" on "I Can't Give Everything Away", writing that: "The reference to themes of acceptance and 'musical catharsis' may suggest the acceptance of mortality in 'I Can't Give Everything Away', as they suggested acceptance of change in 'A New Career in a New Town'." Mojo magazine's Martin Aston compared the message of "I Can't Give Everything Away" to "Rock 'n' Roll Suicide" on Ziggy Stardust (1972), which had described the death of the Ziggy Stardust character.

Many journalists analysed the album's title. Several noted that a "black star lesion", usually found inside a breast, suggests evidence of certain types of cancer. Others noted that Black Star was the name of a rap duo composed of Talib Kweli and Mos Def, whom Bowie shared an interview with in 2003, and the name of an obscure Elvis Presley song from his 1960 film Flaming Star. Presley was a huge influence on Bowie, and lyrics on "Black Star" are about death: "[W]hen a man sees his black star/ He knows his time, his time has come." The cover art was also analysed by journalists and fans. Tim Jonze of The Guardian speculated that the absence of Bowie's image on the cover art in place of a black star "seems to complete this symbolic journey from one world to another".

Blackstar was not the first time Bowie engaged with the concepts of mortality and death. The authors Michael K. Potter and Cam Cobb wrote that "Blackstar was merely the last step in a lifelong lyrical preoccupation" with death and dying, concepts that dated back to songs such as "Please Mr. Gravedigger" from his debut album (1967) to "Bring Me the Disco King" from Reality (2003). The academic scholar Jennifer Lillian Lodine-Chaffey argued that with the "Lazarus" video, Bowie engaged in Ars moriendi, or the art of dying, a 15th-century concept in which individuals artfully plan out their deaths. She writes that by staging his death through the album and music videos, "Bowie allowed for the community of his fans to be involved in his demise, even if his fans did not at first realise the significance of his final video." Bowie's decision to remain silent about his illness and album promotion further allowed fans to create their own interpretations of him. Jack Cowan further said that Blackstar provided "a means of assisting and joining his listeners in their work of mourning", which became a "communal event" as fans shared their memories of him and his music across global networks and social media.

For many of Bowie's fans, Blackstar remains a somber listen and a difficult album to revisit years following its release due to its direct association with his death. Aston opined that despite this, Blackstar remains such a "rich, dynamic and expressive" work that it "lives outside of its context". Slate's Carl Wilson further stated that the album "threatened to be eclipsed by its role as [Bowie's] last will and testament". Several critics have described Blackstar as a perfect farewell for Bowie's fans, being recognised by American Songwriter's Lauren Boisvert as both "an acceptance of death and a farewell to life". The album has since appeared on lists compiling the best final albums in music history. (Note: Attributed to multiple references:)

=== Backing band responses ===
Following Blackstar, the McCaslin Quartet reunited for McCaslin's 2016 album Beyond Now, which was dedicated to and inspired by Bowie. The album includes covers of two Bowie songs: "Warszawa" from Low (1977) and "A Small Plot of Land" from Outside (1995). The band had begun performing "Warszawa" following Bowie's death as a tribute to him. Blackstar also inspired the sound of McCaslin's 2018 album Blow.

Years following its release, Lefebvre says that Bowie's death still affects him, while Guiliana noted that "it makes me happy as well as sad, and [I feel] overwhelming gratitude that Blackstar exists". McCaslin remains proud of their work on Blackstar and grateful for the experience, calling Bowie a "remarkable man". Monder argued: "In retrospect, it all makes sense, even without being aware of the lyrics. There is this amazing balance between darkness and hope. It's simultaneously a celebration of life, and a farewell."

=== Blackstar Symphony ===
After Bowie's death, the McCaslin Quartet received numerous offers to perform Blackstar live, but turned them down out of respect. Following a conversation with the conductor Jules Buckley, McCaslin envisioned performing the album live with an orchestra. McCaslin said: "It was really the idea of the record being like the DNA and the blueprint for the orchestra project, but that the orchestra is really intentionally included in the writing." For the project, McCaslin served as the artistic director, working alongside Buckley, Bowie's past collaborators Maria Schneider and Tony Visconti, among others, to create orchestral versions of the Blackstar album and a selection of Bowie's greatest hits. The band consisted of McCaslin, Lefebvre, Lindner and the drummer Nate Wood (replacing Guiliana). The singer John Cameron Mitchell, Bowie's longtime collaborator Gail Ann Dorsey and the singer-songwriter David Poe sang vocals. The Blackstar Symphony premiered at the Charlotte International Arts Festival in 2022. Discussing the project in 2025, McCaslin stated:

There's a real attention to honoring the spirit that he led with when we do this, a humility that we approach this with and a deep and abiding love for him. ... I think he would have been into this direction, where we try to create a new piece of art with Blackstar.

== Track listing ==
All tracks are written by David Bowie, except where noted.

Blackstar track listing
No.	Title	Music	Length
1.	"Blackstar"		9:57
2.	"'Tis a Pity She Was a Whore"		4:52
3.	"Lazarus"		6:22
4.	"Sue (Or in a Season of Crime)"	Bowie, Maria Schneider, Paul Bateman, Bob Bhamra	4:40
5.	"Girl Loves Me"		4:52
6.	"Dollar Days"		4:44
7.	"I Can't Give Everything Away"		5:47
Total length:			41:14

Download release bonus content
No.	Title	Length
8.	"Blackstar" (video)	10:00
Total length:		51:14

Notes

- "Blackstar" is stylised as "★".
- "Sue (Or in a Season of Crime)" contains elements from "Brand New Heavy" by Plastic Soul, written by Bateman and Bhamra. The latter's surname is consistently misspelled as "Bharma" in the album's liner notes.

== Personnel ==
Personnel adapted from Blackstar liner notes.

Musicians

- David Bowie – vocals, acoustic guitar, Fender guitar ("Lazarus"), harmonica ("I Can't Give Everything Away"), string arrangement ("Blackstar")
- Donny McCaslin – tenor saxophone, flute
- Jason Lindner – piano, Wurlitzer organ, keyboards
- Tim Lefebvre – bass
- Mark Guiliana – drums, percussion
- Ben Monder – guitar
- Tony Visconti – strings ("Blackstar")
- James Murphy – percussion ("Sue (Or in a Season of Crime)" and "Girl Loves Me")
- Erin Tonkon – backing vocals ("'Tis a Pity She Was a Whore")

Production

- David Bowie – production, mixing
- Tony Visconti – production, mixing, engineering
- Tom Elmhirst – final master mixing
- Joe LaPorta – mastering
- Kevin Killen – engineering
- Kabir Hermon – assistant engineering
- Erin Tonkon – assistant engineering
- Joe Visciano – mixing assistance

Artwork

- Barnbrook – album design
- Jimmy King – photography
- Johan Renck – photography ("Dollar Days" image)
- NASA – star image

== Charts ==
=== Weekly charts ===
Weekly chart performance for Blackstar
Chart (2016)	Peak position
Australian Albums (ARIA)	1
Austrian Albums (Ö3 Austria)	1
Belgian Albums (Ultratop Flanders)	1
Belgian Albums (Ultratop Wallonia)	1
Canadian Albums (Billboard)	1
Croatian International Albums (HDU)	1
Czech Albums (ČNS IFPI)	1
Danish Albums (Hitlisten)	1
Dutch Albums (Album Top 100)	1
Finnish Albums (Suomen virallinen lista)	1
French Albums (SNEP)	1
German Albums (Offizielle Top 100)	1
Greek Albums (IFPI)	2
Hungarian Albums (MAHASZ)	4
Irish Albums (IRMA)	1
Italian Albums (FIMI)	1
Japanese Albums (Oricon)	5
Mexican Albums (AMPROFON)	2
New Zealand Albums (RMNZ)	1
Norwegian Albums (VG-lista)	1
Polish Albums (ZPAV)	1
Portuguese Albums (AFP)	1
Scottish Albums (Official Charts)	1
South Korean Albums (Gaon)	29
South Korean Albums International (Gaon)	2
Spanish Albums (PROMUSICAE)	1
Swedish Albums (Sverigetopplistan)	1
Swiss Albums (Schweizer Hitparade)	1
UK Albums (Official Charts)	1
US Billboard 200	1
US Top Alternative Albums (Billboard)	1
US Top Rock Albums (Billboard)	1
US Indie Store Album Sales (Billboard)	1

=== Monthly charts ===
Monthly chart performance for Blackstar
Chart (2016)	Peak position
Argentine Monthly Albums (CAPIF)	2

=== Year-end charts ===
2016 year-end chart performance for Blackstar
Chart (2016)	Peak Position
Australian Albums (ARIA)	8
Austrian Albums (Ö3 Austria)	6
Belgian Albums (Ultratop Flanders)	3
Belgian Albums (Ultratop Wallonia)	9
Canadian Albums (Billboard)	37
Danish Albums (Hitlisten)	17
Dutch Albums (Album Top 100)	7
French Albums (SNEP)	27
German Albums (Offizielle Top 100)	17
Hungarian Albums (MAHASZ)	65
Icelandic Albums (Plötutíóindi)	18
Italian Albums (FIMI)	16
Japanese Albums (Oricon)	78
Mexican Albums (AMPROFON)	94
New Zealand Albums (RMNZ)	6
Polish Albums (ZPAV)	40
South Korean Albums International (Gaon)	39
Spanish Albums (PROMUSICAE)	23
Swedish Albums (Sverigetopplistan)	20
Swiss Albums (Schweizer Hitparade)	6
UK Albums (OCC)	6
US Billboard 200	64
US Top Rock Albums (Billboard)	4
Worldwide Albums (IFPI)	5

2017 year-end chart performance for Blackstar
Chart (2017)	Peak Position
Belgian Albums (Ultratop Flanders)	108
Belgian Albums (Ultratop Wallonia)	182

=== Decade-end chart ===
Decade-end chart performance for Blackstar
Chart (2010–2019)	Position
UK Vinyl Albums (OCC)	15

== Certifications ==
Certifications for Blackstar
Region	Certification	Certified units/sales
Australia (ARIA)	Platinum	70,000^{^}
Austria (IFPI Austria)	Platinum	15,000^{*}
Belgium (BRMA)	Platinum	30,000^{*}
Canada (Music Canada)	Platinum	80,000^{^}
Denmark (IFPI Danmark)	Platinum	20,000^{‡}
France (SNEP)	2× Platinum	200,000^{‡}
Germany (BVMI)	Platinum	200,000^{‡}
Italy (FIMI)	Platinum	50,000^{*}
Netherlands (NVPI)	Platinum	40,000^{‡}
New Zealand (RMNZ)	Platinum	15,000^{‡}
Poland (ZPAV)	Platinum	20,000^{‡}
Portugal (AFP)	Gold	7,500^{^}
Spain (Promusicae)	Gold	20,000^{‡}
Sweden (GLF)	Gold	20,000^{‡}
Switzerland (IFPI Switzerland)	Platinum	20,000^{‡}
United Kingdom (BPI)	Platinum	446,000
United States (RIAA)	Gold	500,000^{‡}
Summaries
Worldwide	—	1,900,000
^{*} Sales figures based on certification alone.^{^} Shipments figures based on certification alone.^{‡} Sales+streaming figures based on certification alone.
