= Lazarus (David Bowie song) =

2015 David Bowie song

Single by David Bowie

from the album Blackstar
- Released: 17 December 2015
- Recorded: 2015
- Studio: Magic Shop, New York City; Human Worldwide, New York City
- Genre: Jazz-rock; gothic rock; art rock
- Length: 6:22 (album version); 4:05 (video edit)
- Label: ISO; Columbia
- Songwriter: David Bowie
- Producers: David Bowie; Tony Visconti

Blackstar track listing
- 7 tracks: 1. "Blackstar"; 2. "'Tis a Pity She Was a Whore"; 3. "Lazarus"; 4. "Sue (Or in a Season of Crime)"; 5. "Girl Loves Me"; 6. "Dollar Days"; 7. "I Can't Give Everything Away"

Music video
- "Lazarus" on YouTube

"Lazarus" is a song by the English rock musician David Bowie. Released on 17 December 2015 as a digital download, it was the second single from his twenty-sixth and final studio album, Blackstar (2016). It is Bowie's last single to be released during his lifetime. The single received its world premiere on BBC Radio 6 Music's Steve Lamacq on the day of its release as a single. In addition to its release on Blackstar, the track is used in Bowie's off-Broadway musical of the same name. The official music video, directed by Johan Renck, was released on 7 January 2016, three days before Bowie's death.

Bowie never performed the song live, but on 17 December 2015, Michael C. Hall appeared on The Late Show with Stephen Colbert, singing "Lazarus" to promote both the single's release and the musical running at New York Theatre Workshop starring Hall.

"Lazarus" was Bowie's first top 40 hit single on the Billboard Hot 100 in more than 28 years, landing at number 40 in the week after his death.

Billboard ranked "Lazarus" at number 40 on their "100 Best Pop Songs of 2016" list. Pitchfork listed "Lazarus" on their ranking of the 100 best songs of 2016 at number 5. In the annual The Village Voice's Pazz & Jop mass critics poll of the year's best in music in 2016, "Lazarus" was ranked at number 8.

== Lyrics and meaning ==
"Lazarus" is a swan song. According to Bowie's producer Tony Visconti, the lyrics and video of "Lazarus" and other songs on the album were intended to be a self-epitaph, a commentary on Bowie's own impending death. The song's reference to Lazarus has been interpreted as referring to Bowie's prediction of increased fame following his death.

== Music video ==
Bowie in a deathbed, as depicted in the music video

The official music video for "Lazarus", featuring a shorter edit of the song lasting just over four minutes, was uploaded on 7 January 2016 to Bowie's Vevo channel on YouTube. The video was directed by Johan Renck (who also directed the music video for Bowie's previous single, "Blackstar") in November 2015; during the week of shooting, doctors reportedly informed Bowie the cancer was terminal and that they were ending treatment. The filming location was a studio in the New York City borough of Brooklyn. The video is shown in a 1:1 aspect ratio and prominently features Bowie, appearing with a bandage and buttons sewn over his eyes, lying on a deathbed. A director's cut exists restoring the original widescreen aspect.

The video finishes with Bowie retreating into a dark wardrobe. According to Renk, Bowie claimed that it was a comedic riff on his mercurial history with his sexuality, quoting the artist as quipping "Yeah, look, David Bowie has come back into the closet! Fuck yeah, we've got to do that. Let's do that right away." In the scenes featuring the wardrobe, Bowie is wearing a diagonally striped suit as seen on the back cover of the 1991 CD reissue of the Station to Station album, where he is pictured sitting on the floor drawing the kabbalistic Tree of Life. The Tree of Life is also referenced in the Station to Station lyrics, a "magical movement from Kether to Malkuth".

The video was nominated for three awards: Best Direction, Best Cinematography and Best Editing, at the 2016 MTV Video Music Awards.

== Cover version ==
In 2020, American rapper G-Eazy covered the song for his compilation album Everything's Strange Here.

== Track listing ==
Digital download
No.	Title	Length
1.	"Lazarus"	6:22

== Personnel ==
Personnel adapted from Blackstar liner notes.

Musicians

- David Bowie – vocals, guitar, mixing, production
- Tim Lefebvre – bass
- Mark Guiliana – drums
- Donny McCaslin – saxophone
- Ben Monder – guitar
- Jason Lindner – Wurlitzer organ, keyboards

Technical personnel

- Tony Visconti – production, engineering, mixing engineer
- Joe LaPorta – mastering engineer
- Kevin Killen – engineering
- Erin Tonkon – assistant engineer
- Joe Visciano – assistant engineer
- Kabir Hermon – assistant engineer
- Tom Elmhirst – mixing engineer

== Charts ==
=== Weekly ===
2015–2016 weekly chart performance for "Lazarus"
Chart (2015–2016)	Peak position
Australia (ARIA)	72
Austria (Ö3 Austria Top 40)	38
Belgium (Ultratop 50 Flanders)	10
Belgium (Ultratop 50 Wallonia)	45
Canada Hot 100 (Billboard)	14
Finland Download (Latauslista)	22
France (SNEP)	35
Germany (Official German Charts)	77
Hungary (Single Top 40)	8
Ireland (IRMA)	48
Israel (Media Forest)	10
Italy (FIMI)	23
Japan Hot 100 (Billboard)	89
Mexico Ingles Airplay (Billboard)	35
Netherlands (Dutch Top 40)	32
Netherlands (Single Top 100)	32
New Zealand Heatseekers (Recorded Music NZ)	9
Portugal (Hung Medien)	13
Spain (PROMUSICAE)	83
Sweden (Sverigetopplistan)	42
Switzerland (Schweizer Hitparade)	16
UK Singles (OCC)	45
US Billboard Hot 100	40
US Hot Rock & Alternative Songs (Billboard)	3

=== Year-end ===
2016 year-end chart performance for "Lazarus"
Chart (2016)	Rank
US Hot Rock Songs (Billboard)	68

== Release history ==
Region	Date	Format	Label
Worldwide	17 December 2015	Digital download	ISO; Columbia
Italy	18 December 2015	Contemporary hit radio	Columbia

== See also ==
- Lazarus of Bethany
- Rich man and Lazarus
