= The Next Day (song) =

2013 song by David Bowie

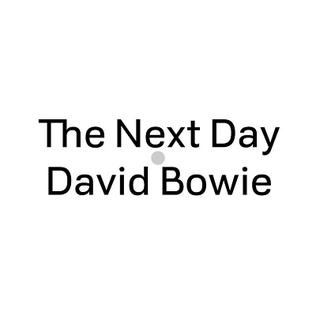

Single by David Bowie

from the album The Next Day
- Released: 17 June 2013
- Recorded: 2 May 2011 (backing track); 16 March 2012 (vocal)
- Studio: Magic Shop, New York City; Human Worldwide, New York City
- Genre: Art rock; hard rock
- Length: 3:27
- Label: ISO; Columbia
- Songwriter: David Bowie
- Producers: David Bowie; Tony Visconti

David Bowie singles chronology
"The Stars (Are Out Tonight)" (2013)	"The Next Day" (2013)	"Valentine's Day" (2013)

Music video
- "The Next Day" (Explicit) on YouTube

"The Next Day" is a single by English rock musician David Bowie, from his 25th studio album, The Next Day. The song caused controversy before the single's release due to its perceived mocking of Christianity, which some Christians considered obscene.

It was released as a white-square-shaped vinyl 45, as a 'limited' edition release. Both sides featured the track. The single reached 179 on the UK Singles Chart.

== Music video ==
The music video debuted on 8 May 2013. It was directed by Floria Sigismondi, who also directed the video for the preceding single, "The Stars (Are Out Tonight)", and features English actor Gary Oldman and French actress Marion Cotillard, along with David Bowie, and music producer Yves Rothman. The video depicts Bowie performing in a bar called The Decameron—reference to the Boccaccio's work of that name known also for its satirical depiction of clergymen—and populated with religious figures and half-naked women. The video also portrays Marion Cotillard's character (who is presumed to be a prostitute) suffering from gruesome stigmata, with the detailed depiction of the blood bursting from her wounds, while the priest is dancing with her. Other horror elements such as eyeballs carried on a plate are also present. The music video ends with the stigmatized woman apparently born again as an innocent girl and Bowie saying simply, "Thank you Gary, thank you Marion, thank you everybody." Bowie then disappears.

=== Controversy ===
Bowie, Cotillard and Oldman as depicted in the video

The video gained wide attention and caused a controversy. It was banned from YouTube just two hours after its release due to "violation of YouTube's Terms of Service." However, the video returned on the website shortly after its removal, with an age restriction. A YouTube spokeswoman stated: "With the massive volume of videos on our site, sometimes we make the wrong call. When it's brought to our attention that a video has been removed mistakenly, we act quickly to reinstate it."

The video also triggered many backlashes and criticisms from various Christian organizations. Bill Donohue, the leader of the Catholic League for Religious and Civil Rights, heavily criticized it and David Bowie, calling the video "a mess" and referring to Bowie as "a switch-hitting, bisexual, senior citizen from London". The former archbishop of Canterbury, George Carey, also criticized the song as "juvenile" and urged other Christians to "rise above." He also stated that he doubted whether Bowie would have the courage to use Islamic imagery. Also, Andrea Williams of Christian Concern questioned the point of the video while Jack Volero of Catholic Voices referred to it as "desperate".

As a reaction to the controversy and Donohue's criticisms, Bowie's official website issued a response, titled "The Next Day the day after". The writing contains an explicit response to the depiction of "the served eyeballs", which is acknowledged to be a reference to Saint Lucy.

== Personnel ==
According to Chris O'Leary:

- David Bowie – lead and backing vocal, electric guitar, string arrangement
- David Torn – guitar
- Gerry Leonard – guitar
- Gail Ann Dorsey – bass guitar
- Zachary Alford – drums, percussion
- Antoine Silverman – violin
- Maxim Boston – violin
- Hiroko Taguchi – viola
- Anja Wood – cello
- Tony Visconti – string arrangement

Technical

- David Bowie – producer
- Tony Visconti – producer, engineer
- Mario J. McNulty – engineer

== Chart performance ==
In Flanders, "The Next Day" reached #53 on the Ultratip in 2013.
