= Bruford Levin Upper Extremities (album) =

Studio album by Bruford Levin Upper Extremities
- Released: 1998
- Studio: Make Believe Ballroom, West Shokan, New York, Bill Bruford's house, Tony Levin's house and garage, The Loop Pool (David Torn's studio), and the Gypsy Wolf Cantina, Woodstock, New York
- Genre: Progressive rock, jazz rock
- Length: 52:47
- Label: Papa Bear Records
- Producer: Tony Levin

Bruford Levin Upper Extremities chronology
Bruford Levin Upper Extremities (1998)	B.L.U.E. Nights (2000)

Bruford Levin Upper Extremities is a self-titled album by the band Bruford Levin Upper Extremities. It is their only studio recording, released on Tony Levin's independent label Papa Bear Records. Formed by bassist Levin and drummer Bill Bruford (who had worked together as the rhythm section of King Crimson), the group also included guitarist David Torn and trumpeter Chris Botti. Torn, Bruford and Levin had recorded together on Torn's album Cloud About Mercury ten years before this.

== Reception ==
Professional ratings
Review scores
Source	Rating
AllMusic	3/5 stars

In a review for The Washington Post, Mike Joyce described the album as "an unusually large and colorful musical mosaic," stating that it "alludes, intentionally or not, to a lot of pop, rock and jazz musicians and bands." He concluded: "for all the album's obvious reference points, the musicians are too stubbornly willful to fall into any groove for long."

S. Victor Aaron of Something Else! praised the track titled "Cracking the Midnight Glass," calling it "a mash-up of contrasting styles that's like the cherry on a sundae for those who like these collisions of genres. I know I do."

Writing for Exposé Online, Jeff Melton called the album a "remarkable work led by possibly one of the best rhythm sections in modern music," and commented: "Although not as dark as any Crimson recording, B.L.U.E. is a shining ring on the challenging clasp where rock meets jazz."

== Track listing ==
No.	Title	Writer(s)	Length
1.	"Cerulean Sea"	Bruford, Levin, Torn	7:03
2.	"Interlude"	Bruford	0:23
3.	"Original Sin"	Bruford	4:55
4.	"Etude Revisited"	Bruford, Botti, Levin, Torn	4:57
5.	"A Palace of Pearls (On a Blade of Grass)"	Bruford, Botti, Levin, Torn	5:33
6.	"Interlude"	Bruford	0:19
7.	"Fin de Siècle"	Bruford, Botti, Levin	5:22
8.	"Drumbass"	Bruford, Levin	0:54
9.	"Cracking the Midnight Glass"	Bruford, Levin, Torn	6:06
10.	"Torn Drumbass"	Bruford, Levin, Torn	0:54
11.	"Thick With Thin Air"	Bruford, Levin, Torn	3:28
12.	"Cobalt Canyons"	Bruford, Levin, Torn	3:53
13.	"Interlude"	Bruford	0:27
14.	"Deeper Blue"	Bruford, Botti, Levin	4:12
15.	"Presidents Day"	Bruford, Botti, Levin, Torn	6:22

== Personnel ==
Bruford Levin Upper Extremities

- Bill Bruford — drums, percussion, keyboards
- Chris Botti — trumpet
- Tony Levin — bass guitar, Chapman Stick
- David Torn — guitars, loops

Production

- Tony Levin – producer
- Tom Mark – engineer
- Bill Bruford, Tony Levin, Tom Mark – mixing
- Bob Ludwig – mastering
- Megan Denver, Tony Levin – artwork, photography
