= Valentine's Day (song) =

2013 song by David Bowie

Single by David Bowie

from the album The Next Day
- B-side: "Plan"
- Released: 19 August 2013
- Recorded: 24 July & 18 September 2012
- Studio: Magic Shop, New York City; Human Worldwide, New York City
- Genre: Glam rock; folk rock
- Length: 2:59
- Label: ISO; Columbia
- Songwriter: David Bowie
- Producers: David Bowie; Tony Visconti

David Bowie singles chronology
"The Next Day" (2013)	"Valentine's Day" (2013)	"Love Is Lost" (2013)

Music video
- "Valentine's Day" on YouTube

"Valentine's Day" is a song by English rock musician David Bowie, the fourth single from his 25th studio album The Next Day. The single was released on 19 August 2013. This was to be Bowie's final 7-inch single issued from a new album released in his lifetime. The lyrics are based on the psychology of a school shooter.

== Recording ==
"Valentine's Day" was one of the final songs recorded for The Next Day. The backing track was recorded on 24 July 2012 at the Magic Shop in New York City, while Bowie's vocals were recorded on 18 September 2012 at Human Worldwide Studios in New York City.

== Release details ==
The single was released on 19 August 2013 in the UK and on the 20th in the US and other countries. In early August 2013, the single was added to the BBC Radio 2's A-list. The single entered UK's Airplay Chart Top 40 on 9 August 2013, making it the second most successful single from The Next Day (after "Where Are We Now?") in terms of airplay. It reached the 179th spot on the UK chart.

== Video ==
The video for "Valentine's Day" was directed by Indrani Pal-Chaudhuri and Markus Klinko, who previously collaborated with Bowie on his 2002 album Heathen. It features Bowie in the abandoned Red Hook Grain Terminal in the Red Hook neighbourhood of Brooklyn, New York. In the video, Bowie plays a G2T Hohner guitar while performing the song. Many commentators contrasted the video with the controversial preceding video for "The Next Day" and described it as more "subdued" in comparison. However, visual hints towards gun violence and the National Rifle Association of America were also noted, suggesting the video was conveying a subtle anti-gun message.

== Personnel ==
According to biographer Chris O'Leary:

- David Bowie – lead and backing vocals
- Earl Slick – lead and acoustic guitar
- Tony Visconti – bass guitar
- Sterling Campbell – drums

Production

- David Bowie – producer
- Tony Visconti – producer

== Charts ==
Chart performance for "Valentine's Day"
Chart (2013)	Peak position
Belgium (Ultratip Bubbling Under Flanders)	59
UK Singles Chart	179
