= Saskia de Brauw =

Dutch artist and fashion model (born 1981)

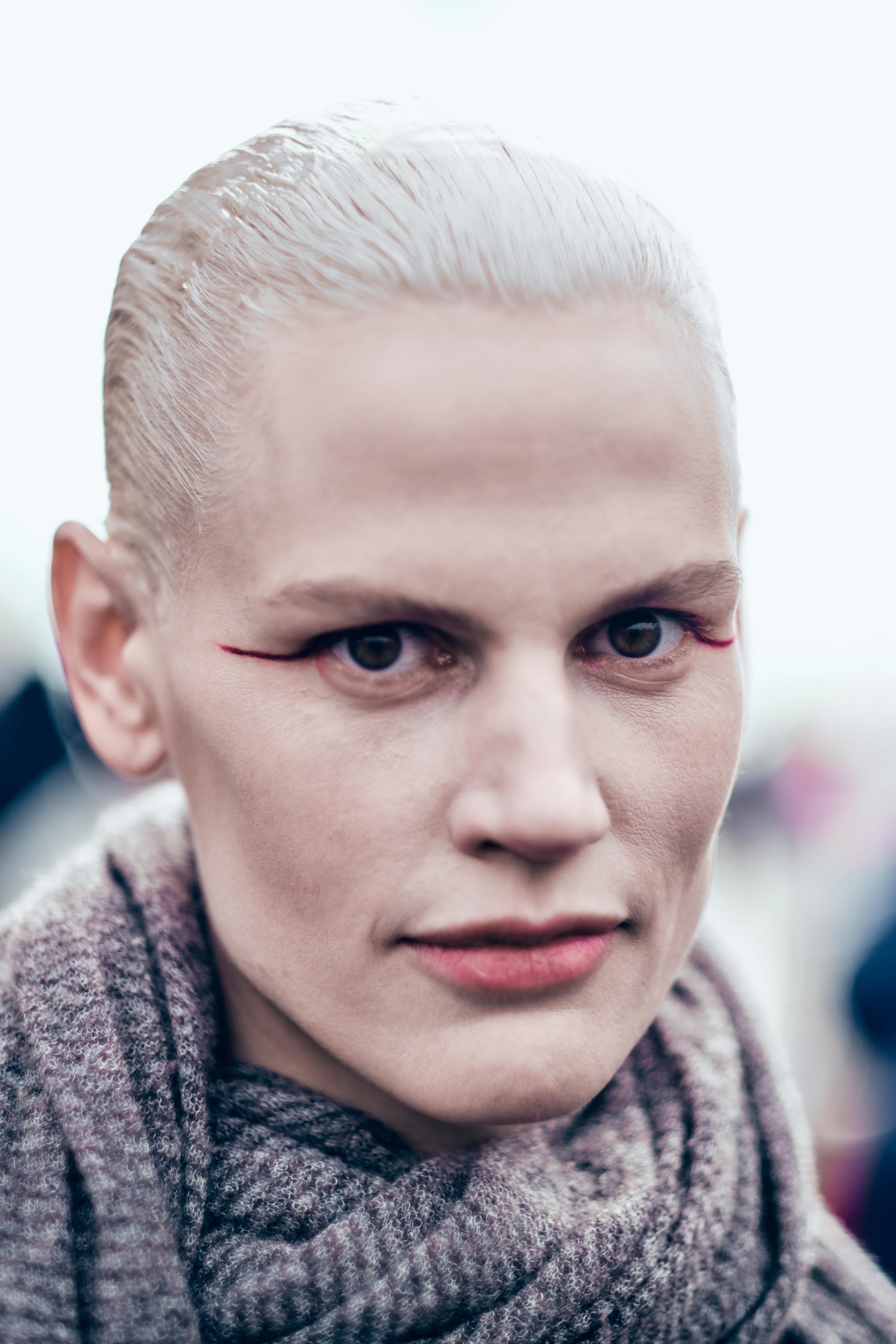
- de Brauw during Paris Fashion Week in 2019
- Born: Amsterdam, Netherlands
- Occupation: Model
- Modeling information
- Height: 1.77 m (5 ft 9 1/2 in)
- Hair color: Brown
- Eye color: Brown
- Agency: DNA Models (New York); VIVA Model Management (Paris, London, Barcelona); Why Not Model Management (Milan); Paparazzi Models (Amsterdam) (mother agency)

Saskia de Brauw (born 19 April 1981) is a Dutch artist and model. She began modelling at a young age but paused her work in the fashion industry to study art at the Gerrit Rietveld Academy. in 2008, she returned to modelling and quickly established herself internationally. Notable appearances include Carine Roitfeld's final cover for French Vogue (2011) and a starring role in David Bowie's 2013 music video The Stars (Are Out Tonight). She is known for her collaborations with leading fashion photographers and houses, as her art has been exhibited at the National Museum of Scotland.

== Early life and education ==
De Brauw was born in Amsterdam, the Netherlands, in 1981. She began modelling in her teens but temporarily stepped away from the fashion industry to pursue formal art education. She studied at the Gerrit Rietveld Academie in Amsterdam, graduating in 2008.

== Career ==
After returning to modelling in her late twenties, de Brauw rapidly gained international recognition. She appeared in fashion shows for Balenciaga and Givenchy and became a "new face" for Chanel; photographed by Mert and Marcus for Carine Roitfeld's final cover of Vogue Paris in March 2011; and the same month featuring on the cover of Vogue Italia, photographed by Steven Meisel.

In 2013, she appeared alongside Andreja Pejić, Tilda Swinton, Iselin Steiro and David Bowie for Bowie's 2013 single "The Stars (Are Out Tonight)" as one of the "stars".

In 2014, Models.com ranked her second in its Top 50 Models list.

She has appeared in editorials for Italian, American, French, British, German, Russian, Japanese, Korean, and Chinese Vogue, Harper's Bazaar, W, i-D, LOVE, V, Numéro, Dazed, and Interview. She has appeared on the covers of Italian, French, German, Dutch, Russian, Japanese, and Korean Vogue, Dutch Elle, Numéro, V, i-D, and Dazed.

She has walked the runways for Lanvin, Céline, Marc Jacobs, Bottega Veneta, Versace, Thierry Mugler, Prada, Giles Deacon, Hugo Boss, Balmain, Jean Paul Gaultier, Stella McCartney, Donna Karan, Fendi, Emilio Pucci, Jason Wu, Diane Von Furstenberg, Altuzarra, Givenchy, Max Mara, Chanel, Louis Vuitton, Isabel Marant, Yves Saint Laurent, Loewe, Sonia Rykiel, Armani Privé, Hermés, Balenciaga, Rick Owens, Tom Ford, Roberto Cavalli, Anna Sui, Derek Lam, Dolce & Gabbana, Narciso Rodriguez, and Miu Miu.

De Brauw has appeared in advertising campaigns for GIADA, Moschino, Chanel, Giorgio Armani, Loewe, Max Mara, Calvin Klein, Fendi, Prada, Lanvin, Karl Lagerfeld, Yves Saint Laurent, Givenchy, Moncler, Zara, Missoni, Louis Vuitton, DSquared2, Paul Smith, Bottega Veneta, Versace, H&M, Fossil, Bergdorf Goodman, and Barneys New York. In 2023 Saskia became the face of Roberto Cavalli Spring collection campaign.

== Artistic practice ==
Alongside her modelling career, de Brauw maintains an independent artistic practice. Her work explores perception, materiality, and the relationship between the body and its surroundings. She works across writing, photography, performance, and assemblage. For many years she carried a compact scanner, creating a visual archive of found urban objects such as broken mirrors, crushed plastic cups, and folded paper. This archive formed the basis for a series of large-scale prints exhibited at the National Museum of Scotland in Edinburgh in 2014 under the title The Accidental Fold. A book of the same name was published in 2016.

In collaboration with photographer and filmmaker Vincent van de Wijngaard, she developed the durational performance Ghosts Don't Walk in Straight Lines (2018), in which she walked slowly through Manhattan for 20 hours wearing a garment by Haider Ackermann. The project was presented as a book, short film, and exhibition at venues including Red Hook Labs (New York), Arundel Gallery (London), and Foam (Amsterdam).

For Louis Vuitton's 200th anniversary in 2021, de Brauw created a series of black-and- white images resembling lunar landscapes composed of objects found on the streets of New York City. The works were exhibited in Louis Vuitton store windows internationally.

She has also written essays, poetry, short stories, and provided voice-over work for magazines and fashion brands.

== Personal life ==
De Brauw lives in Paris and is married to photographer and filmmaker Vincent van de Wijngaard..
