= Andreja Pejić =

Australian model and actress (born 1991)

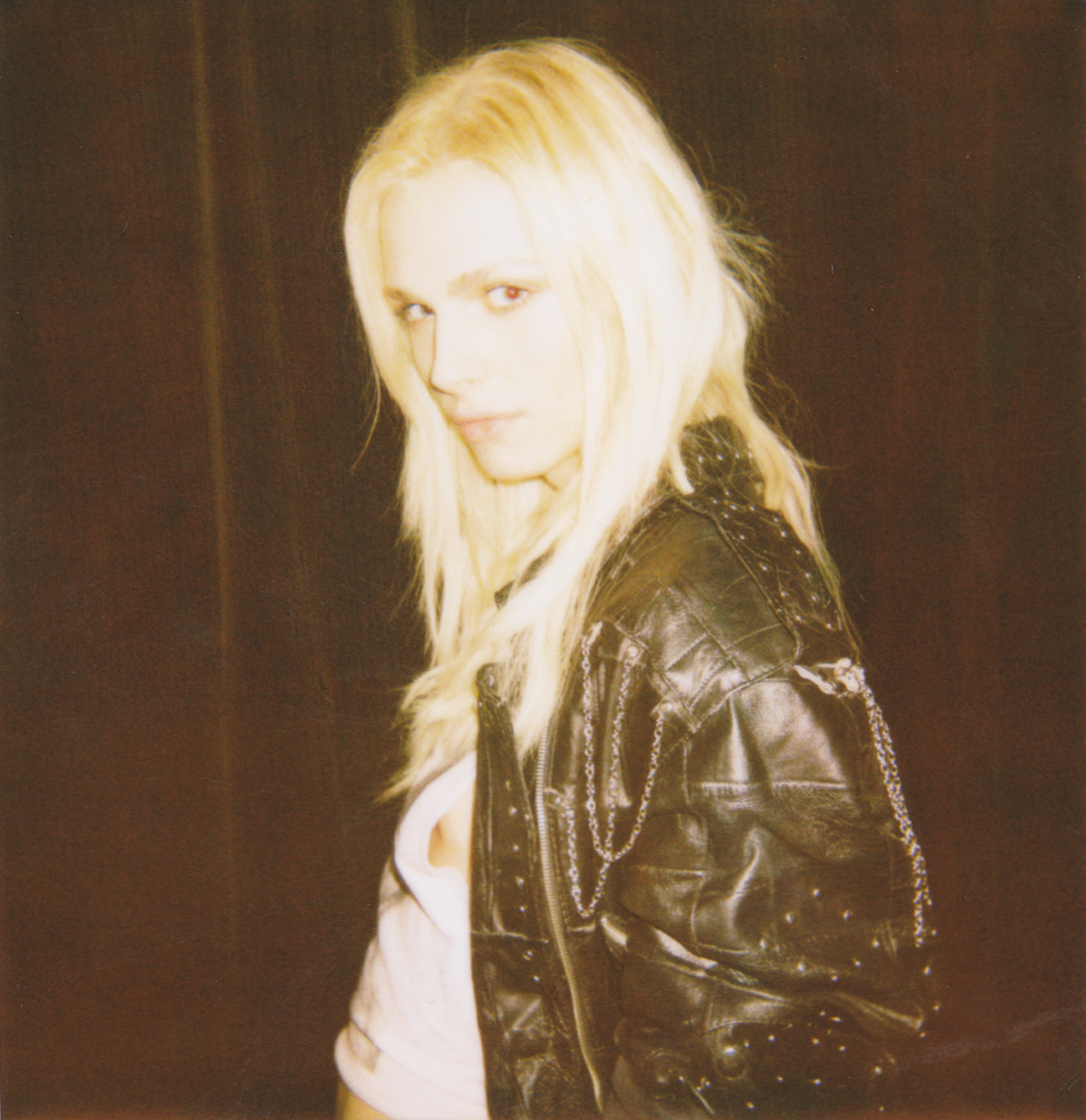
- Pejić in February 2013
- Born: Andrej Pejić; 28 August 1991 (age 35); Tuzla, SR Bosnia and Herzegovina, Yugoslavia
- Occupations: Model; actress
- Modelling information
- Height: 1.88 m (6 ft 2 in)
- Hair colour: Blonde
- Eye colour: Green
- Agency: Ford Models (New York, Paris, Los Angeles); d'management group (Milan); Storm Model Management (London); Sight Management Studio (Barcelona); Mega Model Agency (Hamburg); Way Model Management (São Paulo); Chadwick Models (Sydney); Bravo Models (Tokyo); Visage Management (Zurich)

Andreja Pejić (/ənˈdreɪ.ə ˈpɛdʒɪk/ ən-DRAY-ə PEJ-ik, Serbo-Croatian: [ǎndreja pêːjitɕ]; born Andrej Pejić; on 28 August 1991) is an Australian actress and former model. Since coming out as a trans woman in 2013, she has become one of the most recognisable transgender models in the world.

== Early life ==
Pejić was born in Tuzla, Yugoslavia (now part of Bosnia and Herzegovina), and has one older brother, Igor. Her mother, Jadranka Savić, is a Serb, and her father, Vlado Pejić, is a Bosnian Croat. The couple divorced shortly after Pejić's birth. During the Bosnian War, the siblings fled to Serbia with their mother and grandmother, settling in a refugee camp near Belgrade. After the refugee camp, the family settled in the Vojska village near Svilajnac.

Following the 1999 NATO bombing of Yugoslavia, Pejić's mother felt unsafe and decided to initiate the process of immigration to Australia. In 2000, the family moved to Melbourne, Victoria, Australia, as political refugees when she was eight years old.

While attending high school at University High, Pejić was described as being "academically brilliant".

== Career ==
Pejić was scouted as a model just before her 17th birthday while working at McDonald's, though she has also said in an interview that she was scouted at a swimming pool while still in high school in Melbourne.

Pejić was initially notable for modelling both masculine and feminine clothing. In the Paris fashion shows of January 2011, Pejić walked both the men's and women's shows for Jean-Paul Gaultier and the men's shows for Marc Jacobs. In May 2011, her magazine cover for the New York-based magazine Dossier Journal—in which Pejić, with long blond locks in curlers, is pictured taking off a white shirt —was ruled too risqué by US bookstores Barnes & Noble and Borders, which covered the image with an opaque sleeve. Concerns were expressed that customers would read Pejić, who at the time was presenting as gender fluid, as a topless woman.

At the Stylenite in July 2011, Pejić appeared on the catwalk both in masculine and feminine clothes from Michalsky. The following year, she modeled bridal creations by Spanish designer Rosa Clara at Barcelona's Bridal Week 2013.

Pejić ranked number 18 on Models.com's Top 50 Models list in 2011, was named one of Out's Most Compelling People, and was ranked number 98 in FHM magazine's 100 Sexiest Women in the World 2011, an award that was criticised for its hostile tone to transgender individuals, especially transgender women; the magazine referred to Pejić as a "thing", commenting, "Pass the sick bucket." FHM subsequently removed the copy accompanying Pejić's entry and posted an apology.

Pejić has appeared on the covers of international editions of Elle, Marie Claire, Harper's Bazaar, L'Officiel, Fashion and GQ. Andreja has also appeared in editorials for fashion publications including Vogue, Elle, I-D, Dazed and Confused, Love, Allure, Purple and Numéro.

On 6 August 2012, Pejić appeared as a guest judge on Britain & Ireland's Next Top Model. Pejić became the first openly transgender model profiled by Vogue, in its May 2015 issue, and also became the first-ever trans woman to sign a cosmetics contract. In 2016, Pejić was awarded "Best International Female Model" by GQ Portugal and the following year she made history by becoming the first transgender woman to appear on the cover of GQ.

In 2013, Pejić shifted her focus to acting, appearing alongside Iselin Steiro, Saskia de Brauw, Tilda Swinton and David Bowie in the video for Bowie's 2013 single "The Stars (Are Out Tonight)". In late 2013, she made her acting debut playing Radu the Beautiful in the short-lived Turkish television series Fatih, which is based on the life of Mehmed the Conqueror.

Pejić made her major film debut in the 2018 crime thriller film The Girl in the Spider's Web and has since gone on to act in multiple short films and features, most notably playing the supporting role of Nino in the 2022 film The Other Me. After shooting The Other Me, Pejić spent six months working as a waitress. Pejić shared with Gamerant Magazine, "I just got a job as a waitress, and I was working in this restaurant called El Nido in Santa Fe. I just wanted to ground myself a little bit and explore human beings. Since 18, I was working as a model and traveling the world and I was like, this is a good opportunity to do something normal."

In 2022, Pejić appeared as French singer and artist Amanda Lear, in the biographical film Dalíland, based on the later life of surrealist artist Salvador Dalí.

In a 2022 interview Pejić gave an update on her forthcoming autobiographical documentary: "I'm trying to finish my documentary, which I've been filming over the past seven years, and I've decided to take control of it and tell my own story and direct it myself. I've always felt, from the beginning of my career, the media didn't really understand me and interviews made me quite uncomfortable. Things have progressed a lot more in, say, the past five years, in terms of how we approach gender."

== Filmography ==
Year	Title	Role	Notes
2013	Reason	Gemma Christensen	Short
2017	Bagdad, Florida	Pizza	Short
2018	The Girl in the Spider's Web	Sofia	
2021	Habit	Addy	
2021	Sapphire	Sapphire/Ethan	Short
2021	Bitter Fruit	Eileen	Short
2022	The Other Me	Nino	
2022	Dalíland	Amanda Lear	

== Personal life ==
In late 2013, Pejić underwent sex reassignment surgery. In September 2014, Pejić announced plans on the Kickstarter crowdfunding platform to create a film about her reassignment surgery and life as a woman. Pejić started off with a projected goal of $40,000, ultimately exceeding the target funding goal. Pejić had previously dated Are You the One? cast member Remy Duran.

== See also ==
- List of androgynous people
