= Andy Rinehart =

American drummer

- Born: 1960 (age 65–66); Norwalk, Connecticut, U.S.
- Origin: United States
- Genres: Jazz fusion, crossover music
- Occupations: Musician, entertainer, composer, artist
- Instruments: Accordion, guitar, multi-instrumentalist
- Website: www.andyrinehart.com

Andy Rinehart (born 1960) is an American balladeer, composer and multi instrumentalist.

== Biography ==
Rinehart was born in 1960 in Norwalk, Connecticut. Rinehart started his studies of the guitar at an early age, and at the age of 10 he was recruited by a substitute teacher at his elementary school to sing backing vocals for two pieces performed by Judy Collins on a television show. Afterwards, he learned the piano, and played in several rock bands during high school. He subsequently studied music and theatre at Bard College at Simon's Rock, a progressive college which introduced him to his first non-western music forms and instruments. His formal musical education continued when he enrolled in the classical conservatory of the State University of New York where he researched the relationship between rhythm, culture and perception. He graduated in 1992 with his thesis, Rhythm In Culture, given a special merit award. While at the university he formed his own group, Zulife, and backed regular CBGB’s headliners Being Don And Nothingness. He has analogised the purpose of his songs as similar to that of ‘minstrels in medieval Europe, or the griots of West Africa’.

His interests grew from singer-songwriters such as Joni Mitchell to encompass progressive and hard rock groups including Genesis and Led Zeppelin. By the early 1980s he was attuned to what he termed ‘more dramatic’ music, including Talking Heads and Laurie Anderson, as well as Celtic folk from the Chieftains and traditional music from eastern Europe, Africa and India. He subsequently attended the California Institute of the Arts to study African and Indian music full-time. After a year spent hitchhiking in 1982 he returned to California to undergo a luthier apprenticeship, enabling him to work as a journeyman instrument repairer. He also began to build his own instruments, one of which, a mbira, was later employed by Robert Fripp. Having returned to Connecticut in 1984 Rinehart became a studio engineer and played in a number of rock bands.

Rinehart got a strong interest in a variety of cultures from growing up in a home filled with diverse musical sounds ranging from classical to pop music. His first album, Walking Home (1988), released on his own record label, received several strong reviews in performers’ magazines including Guitar Player and Music Technology. With the album Jason’s Chord (1993) we saw him combine with other established musicians including guitarist David Torn (a Windham Hill Records recording artist known from Everyman Band), bass player Mick Karn (known from Japan) and former Bruce Springsteen / Van Morrison live drummer Kurt Wortmann.

== Discography ==
- 1988: Walking Home (Self Release)
- 1993: Jason's Chord (CMP Records), with David Torn, Mick Karn and Kurt Wortmann
- 2004: Pillbox (Contamine World Music)
