= Blue Night =

Blue Night may refer to:

- "Blue Night", a song on the album Earth Moving by Mike Oldfield
- Blue Night Network of the Toronto Transit Commission
- Blue Night (Michael Learns to Rock album), 2000, or the title track
- Blue Night (Art Blakey album), 1985
- B.L.U.E. Nights, a 2000 album by Bruford Levin Upper Extremities
- Blue Night (film), a 2018 film
