= The Stars (Are Out Tonight) =

2013 song by David Bowie

Single by David Bowie

from the album The Next Day
- B-side: "Where Are We Now?"
- Released: 25 February 2013
- Recorded: 9 May 2011 (backing track); 26 October 2011 (vocals)
- Studio: Magic Shop, New York City; Human Worldwide, New York City
- Genre: Art rock, alternative rock
- Length: 3:57
- Label: ISO; Columbia
- Songwriter: David Bowie
- Producers: David Bowie; Tony Visconti

David Bowie singles chronology
| "Where Are We Now?" (2013) | "The Stars (Are Out Tonight)" (2013) | "The Next Day" (2013) |

Music video
- "The Stars (Are Out Tonight)" on YouTube

"The Stars (Are Out Tonight)" is a song by English musician David Bowie; it serves as the second single from his twenty-fifth studio album The Next Day. The song's official music video was released on 25 February 2013 and the song itself was released for digital download the following day. In the UK it joined BBC Radio 2's Playlist in the B list in March 2013, "The Next Day" was also the album of the week beginning 11 March, the week in which it was released. The song was released with "Where Are We Now?" – the album's first single – on a limited edition 7" 45 vinyl record on 20 April 2013 in celebration of Record Store Day. In December 2013 the song was nominated for a 2014 Grammy Award in the category 'Best Rock Performance'.

The single's artwork is an image of painter Egon Schiele, created by Al Farrow in 1990.

== Composition and reception ==
According to Rolling Stone's Eric B. Danton, "the song starts with a slow, heavy backbeat and guttural guitar that dissolve into a propulsive bassline topped with shards of guitar and atmospheric synthesizers, for an effect reminiscent of vintage Bowie."

Andrew Trendell of Gigwise described the song as a "fierce but vibrant classic Bowie rocker in the vein of material from the brilliant ‘Scary Monsters (And Super Creeps)’," while Billboard critic Eric B. Danton interpreted it as "a return to alternative rock for Bowie."

== Music video ==
The official music video for the song premiered on 25 February 2013, and was made by Italian-Canadian director Floria Sigismondi. It stars Bowie and English actress Tilda Swinton as his wife. Music producer Yves Rothman as a band member and Andreja Pejić and Saskia de Brauw appear as two celebrities who disrupt the couple's lives. The Norwegian model Iselin Steiro plays the young Bowie.

== Charts ==
| Chart (2013) | Peak position |
|---|---|
| Belgium (Ultratip Bubbling Under Flanders) | 9 |
| Belgium (Ultratip Bubbling Under Wallonia) | 16 |
| Canada Rock (Billboard) | 47 |
| Netherlands (Single Top 100) | 88 |
| Israel International Airplay (Media Forest) | 9 |
| Ireland (IRMA) | 89 |
| Japan Hot 100 (Billboard) | 47 |
| Japan Hot Overseas (Billboard) | 7 |
| Mexico Ingles Airplay (Billboard) | 36 |
| UK Singles (OCC) | 102 |
| US Adult Alternative Airplay (Billboard) | 21 |
| US Hot Rock & Alternative Songs (Billboard) | 29 |

== Personnel ==
According to Chris O'Leary:

- David Bowie – lead and backing vocal, 12-string acoustic guitar
- Gail Ann Dorsey – bass, backing vocal
- Gerry Leonard – lead guitar
- David Torn – guitar
- Zachary Alford – drums
- Steve Elson – baritone saxophone, contrabass clarinet
- Tony Visconti – recorder
- Antoine Silverman – violin
- Maxim Boston – violin
- Hiroko Taguchi – viola
- Anja Wood – cello
- Janice Pendarvis – backing vocal

Technical

- David Bowie – producer
- Tony Visconti – producer, engineer
- Mario J. McNulty – engineer
