= Bruford Levin Upper Extremities =

British musical group

- Also known as: B.L.U.E.
- Years active: 1998–2000
- Labels: Discipline Global Mobile
- Past members: Bill Bruford; David Torn; Tony Levin; Chris Botti

Bruford Levin Upper Extremities (B.L.U.E.) was a musical group comprising drummer Bill Bruford, bassist Tony Levin, guitarist David Torn, and trumpeter Chris Botti.

The group's origins can be traced to Torn's ECM Records album Cloud About Mercury (1987), which featured Levin and Bruford, along with Mark Isham on trumpet. Recognizing the chemistry in their collaborative work, the musicians maintained contact and formed B.L.U.E. in the late 1990s under the joint leadership of Bruford and Levin. Chris Botti assumed the trumpeter's role, as Isham was touring with his own band at the time.

The band blended an unusual combination of elements, including jazz, blues, rock and ambient music, to create a unique sound. Bruford and Levin were both longtime members of King Crimson.

== Discography ==
- Bruford Levin Upper Extremities (1998)
- B.L.U.E. Nights (Live) (2000)
