= What Means Solid, Traveller? =

What Means Solid, Traveler?

Studio album by David Torn
- Released: 1996
- Recorded: 1995
- Genre: Jazz fusion
- Length: 62:25
- Label: CMP Records
- Producer: David Torn and Kurt Renker

David Torn chronology
Tripping Over God (1995)	What Means Solid, Traveler? (1996)	GTR OBLQ (1998)

Professional ratings
Review scores
Source	Rating
Allmusic	link

What Means Solid, Traveller? is an album by guitarist David Torn, released in 1996.

== Track listing ==
1. "Spell Breaks with the Weather" (5:49)
2. "What Means Solid, Traveller?" (6:52)
3. "Such Little Mirrors" (7:22)
4. "Tiny Burns a Bridge" (8:42)
5. "Gidya Hana" (7:27)
6. "Each Prince, to His Kingdom, Must Labor to Go" (3:58)
7. Particle Bugs @ Purulia Station" (7:42)
8. In the Sand of this Day (a) "I Will Not Be Free... (2:59)
9. (b) "...Til You Are Free" (4:25) (live)
10. "Elsewhere, Now Than Waving" (10:09)

== Personnel ==
- David Torn - guitar & guitar-like thingies, textural & rhythmic loops, samples, voices, the pink lark, percussion, Cody's viola, Elijah's bass, mandolina, kotar
- Fima Ephron - acoustic bass (tracks 5 & 7), el bass (first half of track 5)

Samples from -

- Will Calhoun - drum kit loop (track 1)
- Cannonball Adderley - little spoken vocal (track 1)
- Gota Yashiki - the groove activator, drumkit loops (tracks 2,3 & 9)
- Steve Jansen - drum kit loop (track 5)
- David Ruffy - drum kit loop (track 7)
- Mitch Mitchell - drum kit fill (track 9)
