= The Next Day =

2013 studio album by David Bowie

Studio album by David Bowie
- Released: 8 March 2013
- Recorded: May 2011 – October 2012
- Studios: Magic Shop (New York City); Human Worldwide (New York City)
- Genres: Rock; art rock
- Length: 53:17
- Labels: ISO; Columbia
- Producers: David Bowie; Tony Visconti

David Bowie chronology
A Reality Tour (2010)	The Next Day (2013)	Nothing Has Changed (2014)

Singles from The Next Day
- 1. "Where Are We Now?" Released: 8 January 2013; 2. "The Stars (Are Out Tonight)" Released: 26 February 2013; 3. "The Next Day" Released: 17 June 2013; 4. "Valentine's Day" Released: 19 August 2013; 5. "Love Is Lost (Hello Steve Reich Mix by James Murphy for the DFA)" Released: 16 December 2013 (12")

The Next Day is the twenty-fifth studio album by the English musician David Bowie. Released in March 2013, it was Bowie's first studio release in ten years, as he had retreated from public view after undergoing a procedure to treat a blocked heart artery in 2004. Co-produced by Bowie and Tony Visconti, the album was recorded in New York City between May 2011 and October 2012. It featured contributions from session musicians, some of whom he had worked with in the past, including Gerry Leonard, Earl Slick, Gail Ann Dorsey, Steve Elson, Sterling Campbell and Zachary Alford. Recording took place in secret; all personnel involved signed non-disclosure agreements.

Primarily an art rock album, The Next Day references Bowie's earlier glam and funk releases. The generally bleak lyrics draw from his reading of English and Russian history and examine themes of tyranny and violence. The cover art is an adapted version of Bowie's 1977 album "Heroes" by the designer Jonathan Barnbrook, who placed a white square with the album's title over Bowie's face and crossed out the "Heroes" title. The album was released through ISO Records in association with Columbia Records.

The lead single "Where Are We Now?" and announcement of the album were posted online on 8 January 2013, Bowie's 66th birthday, surprising fans and media who had assumed he had retired from music. Preceded by a viral marketing campaign, The Next Day topped charts worldwide and debuted at number one and two on the UK Albums Chart and US Billboard 200, respectively. It was Bowie's first UK number-one album since 1993 and his highest-charting US album to that date. Several singles with accompanying music videos were released throughout 2013. Outtakes and remixes appeared on The Next Day Extra, released in November.

The Next Day was praised by critics as Bowie's best work in decades; it was ranked amongst the best albums of 2013 by several publications. Many reviewers highlighted the vocal and musical performances, and made positive comparisons to his earlier works, though some felt the album lacked innovation and was overlong. Among the first surprise albums of the 2010s, The Next Day was included in the 2014 revised edition of the book 1001 Albums You Must Hear Before You Die.

== Background ==
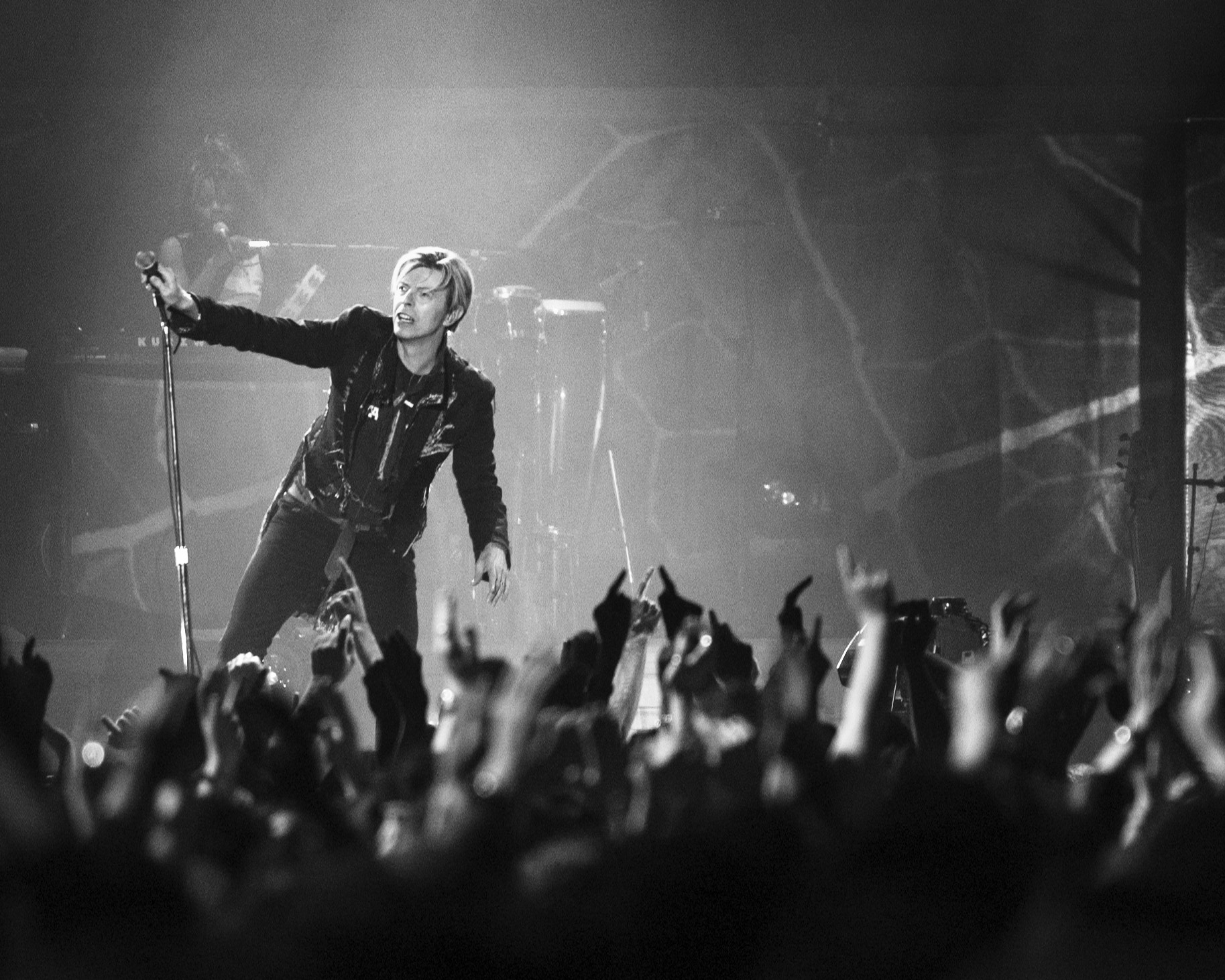
Bowie in November 2003 during A Reality Tour, his final concert tour

David Bowie underwent angioplasty for a blocked heart artery in late June 2004, leading to the abrupt end of his final live concert tour. He largely withdrew from public view, and made his final live public performance in November 2006. His only studio recordings made were minor contributions for other artists such as TV on the Radio and Scarlett Johansson. He reduced contact with many of his prior collaborators after his surgery. Rumours circulated that he was in poor health, particularly after he declined repeated invitations to perform at the 2012 Summer Olympics in London.

Bowie sought out his longtime producer Tony Visconti in November 2010, leading to the recording of demos with guitarist Gerry Leonard and drummer Sterling Campbell. The sessions took place over several days at 6/8 Studios in Manhattan's East Village, a rehearsal room which Leonard likened to "a little dungeon". The songs were written and created on digital recorders, and completed with basslines and drum patterns. After about a dozen demo tracks primarily consisting of keyboards and wordless guide vocals for melodies, Bowie returned home and spent four months rewriting and developing the material they recorded.

== Recording ==
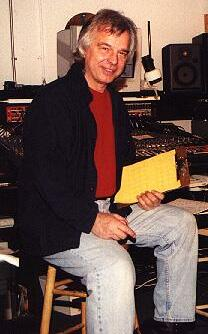
Bowie's longtime collaborator Tony Visconti (pictured in 2000) co-produced The Next Day.

Bowie began a low-key search for a New York studio in April 2011. (Note: Looking Glass Studios, the location where Bowie recorded his records from 1997's Earthling to 2003's Reality, closed in 2009.) The first venue chosen was discarded before recording after its personnel exposed Bowie's involvement. He eventually chose Crosby Street's Magic Shop, located near his home. The studio's owner, Steve Rosenthal, recalled that the staff were unaware of the arrangement until the first day Bowie arrived. Recording began on 2 May 2011 with Bowie and Visconti as co-producers. The sessions continued sporadically until October 2012 and involved several musicians and technicians Bowie had worked with before.

As engineer, Bowie and Visconti employed Mario J. McNulty, who had worked on Reality. McNulty set up workstations for each musician in the studio's small "live" room. Bowie had a Baldwin piano, his Korg Trinity synthesiser, six-string and twelve-string acoustic guitars, a tambourine and a digital mixer, using the demos for reference. Like the early sessions for Outside (1995), Bowie encouraged experimentation. At his and Visconti's request, McNulty applied studio processing on the mixing board so it would "sound like a record on playback". Bowie disappeared with the music "to make sure he was on the right track", then brought the band back together to take the next step in recording when he was ready. Visconti described the sessions as "intense", but they stuck to regular hours.

=== Recording sessions ===
For the first two weeks in May 2011, Leonard was joined by bassist Gail Ann Dorsey and guitarist David Torn, the latter of whom appeared on Heathen (2002) and Reality. Campbell, who was touring with the B-52's, was replaced by Earthling (1997) drummer Zachary Alford, who played on most of The Next Day's tracks. According to Alford, most of the songs were completed in two to five takes, recording one to two tracks per day. Leonard recalled that the sessions moved relatively quickly, but never felt rushed: "David likes to work hard in short bursts and get it done."

The sessions yielded the tracks "Atomica", "Born in a UFO", "Dancing Out in Space", "Heat", "How Does the Grass Grow?", "If You Can See Me", "Like a Rocket Man", "The Next Day", "So She", "The Stars (Are Out Tonight)" and "You Feel So Lonely You Could Die". Many of the tracks recorded in May received subsequent work, including overdubs by other musicians. Recording briefly halted until September, when Bowie was joined by Leonard, Alford and Tony Levin, the bassist who played on Heathen. Songs taped during the week-long session included "Boss of Me", "Dirty Boys", "God Bless the Girl", "I'd Rather Be High", "I'll Take You There", "The Informer", "Love Is Lost" and "Where Are We Now?" During breaks from the studio, Visconti walked the streets of New York listening on headphones to the music they were composing.

Bowie recorded vocals from September 2011 to January 2012 at Human Worldwide Studios, where the majority of the backing vocals and other overdubs were added. Lead vocals recorded during this time included "Boss of Me", "God Bless the Girl", "Heat", "How Does the Grass Grow?", "The Informer", "Love Is Lost", "The Stars (Are Out Tonight)" and "Where Are We Now?"; he also tracked every instrument aside from drums on an instrumental track titled "Plaid" in January. He initially struggled with lyrics and vocals, having not recorded for several years. Dorsey and Leonard were afraid the artist would abort the album; Magic Shop assistant engineer Brian Thorn commented: "I was prepared to sit on it for as long as I needed to."

The musicians were given little information beforehand. Saxophone overdubs were provided by Steve Elson, who had worked with Bowie since the 1980s. The new arrival Henry Hey, whose previous credits included works with George Michael and Rod Stewart, contributed piano overdubs over several sessions at both the Magic Shop and Human Worldwide on "Where Are We Now?", "The Informer", "God Bless the Girl" and "You Feel So Lonely You Could Die". Hey was hired by Bowie at Visconti's recommendation after the two had worked together on a Lucy Woodward jazz album, the producer extolling Hey's "versatility and flawless technique". Bowie frequently requested input from the musicians. Hey enjoyed the method, telling biographer Nicholas Pegg: "It's a great way to work as it allows people to put forth their most prominent instinct on a passage." (Note: Bowie later enlisted Hey as the musical director for his Lazarus musical.)

Leonard was brought back to the Magic Shop for guitar overdubs in March 2012, while Bowie continued tracking lead vocals. From March to May, the second batch included "Dirty Boys", "I'd Rather Be High", "I'll Take You There", "If You Can See Me", "Like a Rocket Man", "The Next Day" and "You Feel So Lonely You Could Die". Further recording for backing tracks commenced in late July. Visconti took over on bass, and Campbell and guitarist Earl Slick joined the sessions. Songs recorded included a new version of "Born in a UFO", "Valentine's Day" and "(You Will) Set the World on Fire". Slick, who contributed overdubs to "Dirty Boys" and "Atomica", was "pleasantly surprised" by the invitation to play on the album and described the sessions as "relaxed and fun". Bowie tracked a final round of vocals from September to October: "Born in a UFO", "Dancing Out in Space", "So She", "Valentine's Day" and "(You Will) Set the World on Fire".

=== Secrecy ===
Bowie was careful to keep the recording of the album secret, requiring those involved to sign non-disclosure agreements. The Magic Shop ran with a skeleton crew of only one or two employees on days when Bowie was there. Bowie's label were also unaware of the sessions; Sony Music president Rob Stringer did not learn of the project's existence until October 2012, when he was invited to hear a few tracks.

Studio manager and assistant engineer Kabir Hermon recalled having a few close calls throughout recording. In October 2011, King Crimson guitarist Robert Fripp, who played on "Heroes" (1977) and Scary Monsters (1980), posted on his blog about a dream he had in which he received an invite from Bowie to work on a new project. The post initially attracted publicity despite Fripp having zero knowledge about Bowie's return to the studio. Once the new album was officially announced, claims that Fripp turned down an invitation to play on it were denied by the guitarist, who told The Guardian that he was not approached to contribute. Slick was also spotted by a cameraman outside the studio in July 2012.

== Music and lyrics ==
Commentators generally characterise The Next Day as a rock album, or art rock. The tracks feature similar styles and references to many of Bowie's past albums, from Ziggy Stardust (1972) and Low (1977), to Never Let Me Down (1987) and Hours (1999); several critics likened it to the music of Scary Monsters in particular. Some viewed The Next Day as an extension of its two predecessors, Ludovic Hunter-Tilney of Financial Times stating that it is "as though it were indeed recorded on the next day and not after 10 years of unexplained inactivity".

Dark themes pervade the lyrics of The Next Day, leading Nicholas Pegg to call it one of Bowie's "bleakest" albums. In contrast to the spiritual ideals that characterised Heathen and Reality, the author relates The Next Day's lyrical themes to Bowie's 1967 self-titled debut, Lodger (1979) and his first album with the band Tin Machine (1989). Many of the tracks concern conflict, from physical, emotional and spiritual, to cultural and ideological. Several probe the mind-sets of individuals, many of whom feel abandoned or lost, either out of reach or out of their depth. The tracks contain images of tyranny, oppression, violence and slaughter, and characters such as assassins, hitmen, revolutionaries and soldiers. Uncut's David Cavanagh wrote that The Next Day transports listeners "from one scenario to another, often across continents and centuries, requiring us to readjust and get our bearings". According to Visconti, Bowie spent time during his sabbatical from music reading books on medieval English history, Russian history and the monarchs of Great Britain, which were reflected in the album's lyrics; Pegg compares it to the material on Hunky Dory (1971) and Station to Station (1976). The Guardian's Alexis Petridis found the lyrics "so dense and allusive you occasionally feel in need of a set of York Notes to get through them". The presence of younger characters was also highlighted by Pegg and Cavanagh.

=== Songs ===
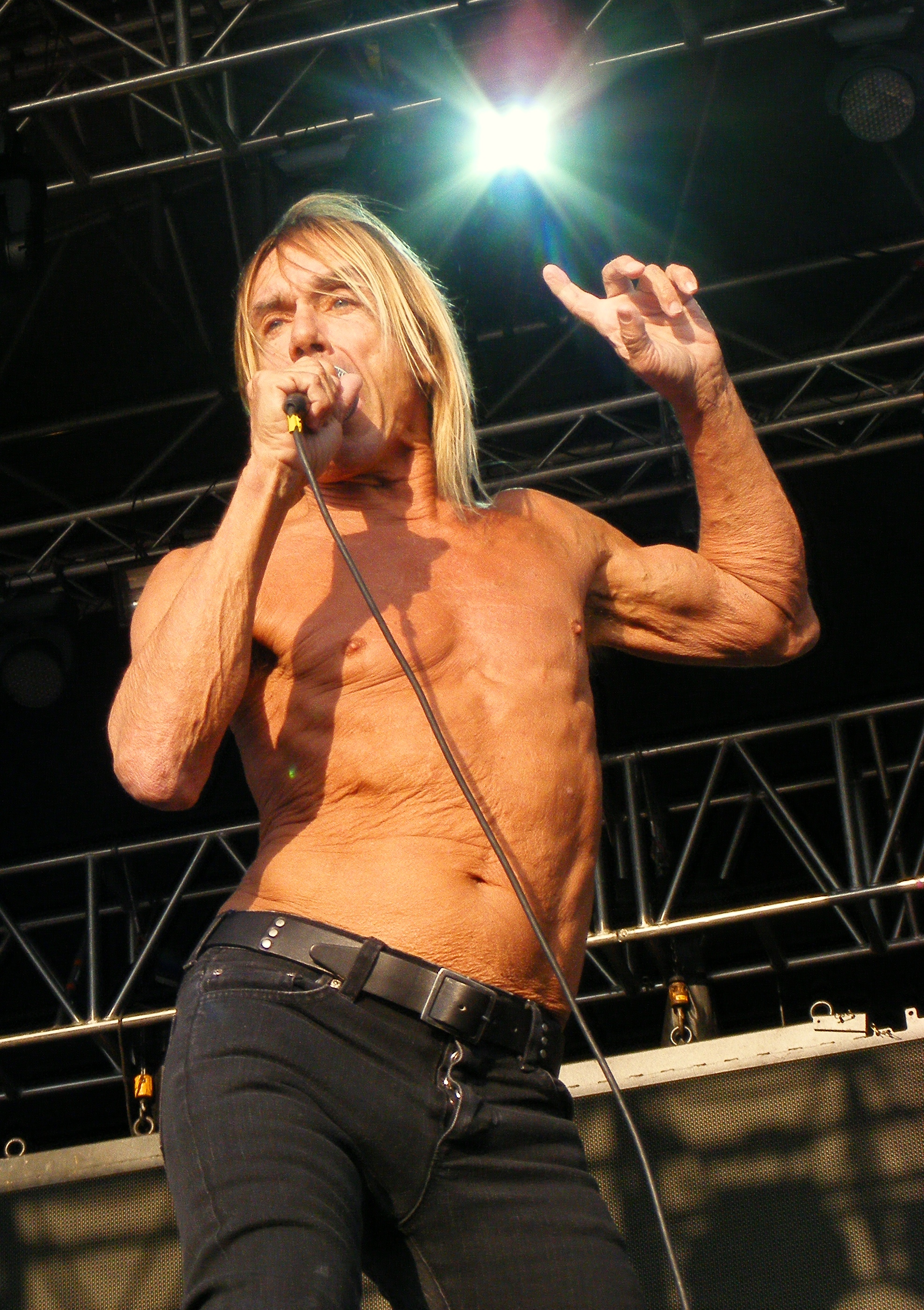
Several tracks drew comparisons to Bowie's late-1970s works with Iggy Pop (pictured in 2011).

Containing 14 songs, The Next Day opens with the title track, which employs a guitar-driven funk rock groove. The lyrics, describing a condemned man facing a penalty, provide commentary on corrupt edifices of religion, and the Christian church in particular. The line "Here I am, not quite dying" was interpreted by O'Leary as a response to the Flaming Lips' song "Is David Bowie Dying?" (2011). The following track "Dirty Boys" is an abrupt change of tone, and uses a slower-tempo, stuttering staccato rhythm emphasised by Slick's guitar and Elson's baritone saxophone. A few critics drew comparisons with songs on Iggy Pop's Bowie-produced 1977 album The Idiot, particularly "Nightclubbing" and "Tiny Girls". The lyrics concern a delinquent street gang, similar to Bowie's 1966 track "The London Boys".

"The Stars (Are Out Tonight)" is written from the point of view of an ageing celebrity looking at up-and-coming performers. Hunter-Tilney described the track as "a sexagenarian take on the Hollywood depravity" of Aladdin Sane's "Cracked Actor" (1973). The lyrics of "Love Is Lost" are from the perspective of a 22-year-old in their darkest hour: he or she has lost their sight while looking into the past. According to Visconti, the song is "not about a love affair, but how everyone has cut down their feelings in the internet age". The track features an organ and heavy rhythm track, including a distorted snare drum effect similar to Low, that was described as somewhere between "the trick-shot ska of 'Ashes to Ashes' [1980] and the robotic glide of early Kraftwerk" over keyboards and guitars.

"Where Are We Now?" details Bowie's life in Berlin in the late 1970s. He positions himself as "a man lost in time", and meditates on how the city had changed since the fall of the Berlin Wall in 1989. The rhythm track uses a subdued instrumental, recalling "The Loneliest Guy" and "Thursday's Child" from Reality and Hours, respectively. Visconti felt the song's melancholic tone differed from the rest of the album. Biographer Chris O'Leary calls "Valentine's Day" the catchiest song on the album. Featuring glam guitars and 'sha-la-la-la' backing vocals, Cavanaugh noticed a touch of Lou Reed's "Satellite of Love" from his Bowie co-produced album Transformer (1972). The lyrics concern a character named Valentine on the day he will become famous as a school shooter. It was inspired by the increasing number of school shootings in the United States in the preceding years, including the 1999 Columbine High School massacre. (Note: The Sandy Hook Elementary School shooting occurred three months after Bowie recorded his vocals for "Valentine's Day".)

"If You Can See Me" was described by O'Leary as the "chaotic centrepiece" of the album. It contains changing time signatures and chord progressions, recalling the drum and bass styles of Earthling and anticipating the free jazz experimentation of "Sue (Or in a Season of Crime)" (2014). The lyrics feature cut-up and fragmented images that drew comparisons to Outside. Visconti suggested that "identities switch between someone who may be Bowie and a politician"; Pegg speculated that "Bowie is conjuring an abstract everyman, an embodiment of every deranged leader who ever lived". "I'd Rather Be High" is a culmination of the album's lyrical themes, and describes a young traumatised soldier in the desert who declares that he would "rather be high" and succumb to his emotions. O'Leary argues that the track presents a broader theme: "Civilization's recursive betrayal of its youth." Billboard's Phil Gallo found the music a piece of neo-psychedelia reminiscent of works by the Beatles and the Smiths, with swirling guitars and a military-style drumbeat.

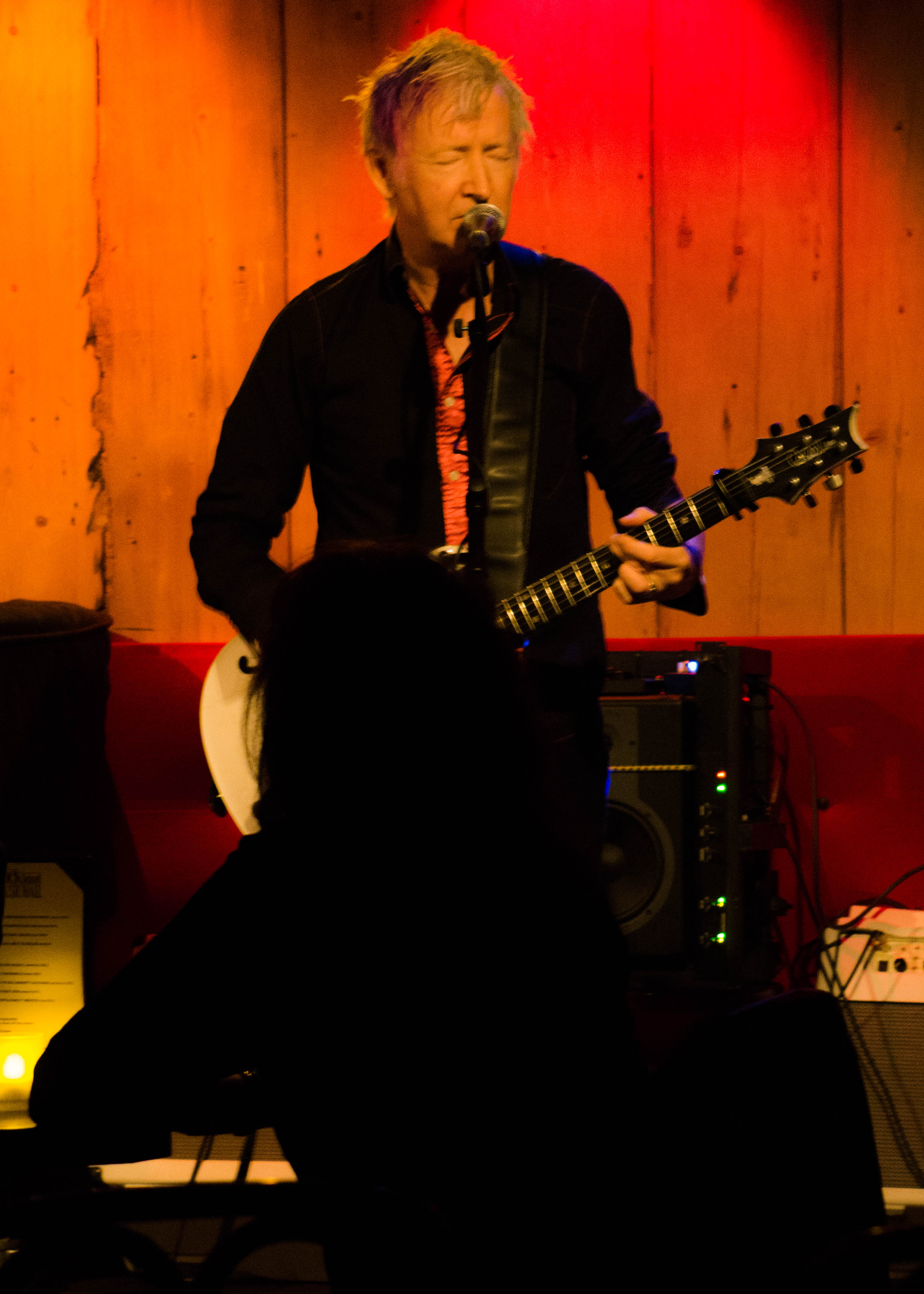
Guitarist Gerry Leonard (pictured in 2015) co-wrote "Boss of Me" and the outtake "I'll Take You There".

"Boss of Me" is the first of two Bowie–Leonard tracks; Leonard composed the central riff and chord structure. The simple lyrics concern a small-town girl. Kyle Anderson of Entertainment Weekly relates its "gospel-glam strut" to Aladdin Sane's "Watch That Man". Visconti said "Dancing Out in Space" is about another musical artist, or a combination of artists. It references Georges Rodenbach's Bruges-la-Morte (1892), although O'Leary finds the lyrics "a little more than crossword clues without answers". Musically, the track is a camp and "bouncy" pop song with a Motown-inspired beat. Some compared the rhythm to Pop's "Lust for Life" (1977), which Bowie co-wrote and co-produced.

"How Does the Grass Grow?" reflects wartime with a lyric that juxtaposes life before and after the conflict. O'Leary opines that it acts as one of the album's "connecting hubs" with its thematic links to other songs. The melody of the "ya ya yay a" line is taken directly from the Shadows' 1960 instrumental "Apache"; Bowie shares a songwriting credit with the instrumental's writer Jerry Lordan. A few outlets contrasted it with Lodger's "Boys Keep Swinging". "(You Will) Set the World on Fire" is a mid-1980s rocker, the heaviest track on the album, that mimics Bowie's 1987 cover of Pop's "Bang Bang". It takes place in 1960s Greenwich Village amid protests occurring during the era and follows a young female singer.

"You Feel So Lonely You Could Die" references Ziggy Stardust, using the drum beat of "Five Years" in the outro, and the guitar figure of "Rock 'n' Roll Suicide" throughout, as well as the vocal arrangement from The Man Who Sold the World's "The Supermen" (1970). In Consequence of Sound, Cat Blackard commented that "the lyrics easily fit into Ziggy's future world of indifferent, over-indulged youths, five years before humanity's end". Visconti remarked, "it sounds like a love song, [but it is actually] about Russian history, from the time of the Cold War and espionage, and about an ugly demise." The song itself is a waltz ballad with a vibrant soul-rock arrangement. "Heat" is a mood piece musically reminiscent of Outside's "The Motel" and the late 1970s works of Scott Walker, whom Bowie noted as an influence. (Note: Attributed to multiple references:) Pegg describes the track as "a profoundly imagined, superbly controlled piece of work which gathers up the distilled loneliness, self-doubt and existential anxiety of fifty years of songwriting, and boils them away on a slow, relentless simmer".

=== Outtakes ===
"God Bless the Girl" is described by O'Leary as The Next Day's edition of Young Americans (1975) and "Underground" (1986). Its building music combines an acoustic Bo Diddley riff with electric ambient guitar out of Heathen; the lyrics describe a girl who was "aiming for the stars but landed on the clouds" and has run out of options. "So She" is an up-tempo 1960s-inspired pop song that references the beat of Reality's "Days", the ambient guitars and layered vocal harmonies of Hours, and a slide guitar from that album's single "Seven". "Plan" is the first instrumental on a Bowie album since "Brilliant Adventure" from Hours. The music is reminiscent of the ambient tracks from Low and "Heroes", producing what Pegg calls a "sinister and hypnotic" effect. "I'll Take You There" is the second of two Bowie–Leonard penned tracks from the sessions. A driving rock song that recalls Bowie's 1980s works, from the guitar stylings of "Ashes to Ashes" to the harder numbers on Never Let Me Down and Tin Machine, its direct lyrics follow the hopes and dreams of two refugees who aspire to start anew in the United States.

Similar to the album's title track, "Atomica" features a guitar-heavy sound with slapping bass and a post-glam groove that recalls the 1988 re-recording of Lodger's "Look Back in Anger". "The Informer" is musically driven by a funky beat against a collage of layered instruments that Pegg compares to the Scary Monsters track "Teenage Wildlife". The lyrics pay tribute to Martin McDonagh's dark comedy In Bruges (2008), in which a narrator admits to committing an unspecified tragedy that led to a violent death but his true identity, whether a police informant or contract killer, is unclear. The title of "Like a Rocket Man" recalls Elton John's "Rocket Man" (1972). Described by O'Leary as "catchy [and] subversive", the lyrics concern a girl addicted to cocaine, amid themes that echo Bowie's mindset during his Station to Station period; Pegg analyses it as Bowie poking fun at his younger self. "Born in a UFO" was developed from an unreleased track recorded during the Lodger sessions, musically resembling late-1970s new wave, particularly other Lodger tracks like "Red Sails" and "D.J.", and early Elvis Costello and Talking Heads. The lyrics recall science fiction B-movies of the 1950s. Pegg and O'Leary consider it a tribute to Bruce Springsteen, its title referencing "Born in the U.S.A." (1984) and its verse melody mirroring "Prove It All Night" (1978).

== Artwork and packaging ==
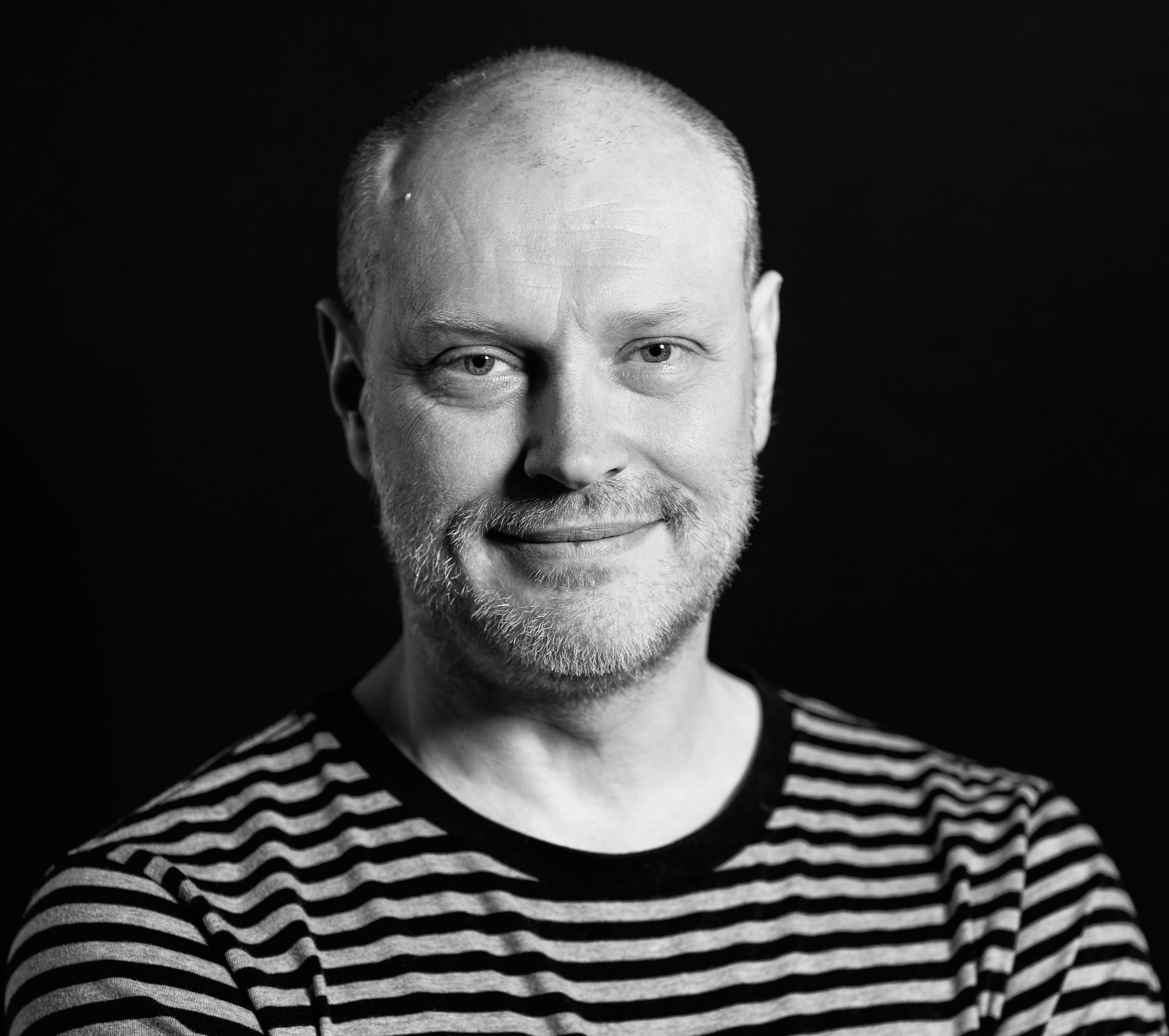
Jonathan Barnbrook (pictured in 2016) designed the cover art for The Next Day.

The album's cover art was designed by graphic artist Jonathan Barnbrook, who previously designed the typography for Heathen and co-designed the Reality artwork. It is an adapted version of the "Heroes" cover, with a white square containing the album's title in black Doctrine font obscuring Bowie's face, and a line drawn across the original album's title. Barnbrook told the NME that the design started with an image of Bowie during a concert at Radio City Music Hall in late-1974 and underwent many changes. (Note: The Radio City image, depicting Bowie leaning at a 45-degree angle gripping a microphone stand, was flipped upside down and used as the download image for the "Where Are We Now?" single.) Wanting to encompass the feeling of isolation that Bowie desired, the design eventually settled on the "Heroes" cover. Barnbrook commented:

We tried out every single Bowie cover there's been, but it ended up as "Heroes" because it's such an iconic album, and the image on the front has the right kind of distance. Originally the album was going to be called Love Is Lost ... but The Next Day, in combination with the "Heroes" image, and what the album is saying about somebody who's looking back at his age ... it just felt appropriate.

Visconti initially assumed the design was a joke conceived by a fan. O'Leary said that the cover signifies "the day after being heroes". Alongside the Radio City image, other rejected designs included the Aladdin Sane cover defaced with red paintbrush strokes and the Pin Ups (1973) cover with black circles obscuring Bowie and Twiggy's faces. According to Pegg, another rejected design departed from the obscured theme and instead depicted the album's title against "a riot of op-art monochrome patterns" in the style of Bridget Riley. Barnbrook provided several of the discarded designs for the 2013 David Bowie Is exhibition at the Victoria and Albert Museum in London. (Note: The exhibition opened the same month as The Next Day's release, although the V&A curators had no knowledge of the album, nor the production team of the BBC2 documentary David Bowie: Five Years, which was also unveiled around the same time.)

== Announcement ==
Even before the recording of The Next Day had begun, journalists were speculating that Bowie had retired from music. In The Complete David Bowie, Pegg writes how keeping the album secret provided a work environment in which Bowie could work in peace and retain full control of the project's outcome. The rise of social media and smartphones since the release of Reality made spoilers and leaks increasingly common, making it difficult to keep projects secret. Bowie wanted to maintain a total information blackout until he was ready to announce the album. Radiohead had achieved a similar scenario with their 2007 album In Rainbows, although unlike The Next Day, it was widely known they were recording at the time.

Bowie decided in late 2012 to release "Where Are We Now?" as the opening single on 8 January 2013, his 66th birthday, with no prior announcement. To accompany the release, he enlisted Tony Oursler, whom he previously worked with on projects in 1997, to create a music video that reflected the song's introspective mood. In the video, the heads of Bowie and Oursler's wife Jaqueline Humphries are projected on two animal puppets, while the lyrics appear over grainy footage of Berlin. Alan Edwards, Bowie's PR manager in the UK, learned of the single only four days in advance. With little time to plan, Edwards informed some of his most trusted journalist colleagues to run headlines on the morning of release to appear as though there had been no pre-planning. The video was uploaded to YouTube in the early hours of the morning; Bowie's website announced that listeners could buy the single on iTunes and pre-order the album. Aided by the surprise announcement, "Where Are We Now?" reached number six on the UK Singles Chart, becoming Bowie's highest-charting single since "Absolute Beginners" in 1985.

== Release ==
The viral marketing campaign launched to promote The Next Day on 15 February 2013 grew out of the concept behind the album cover, taking seemingly ordinary images and subverting them through the addition of a white square. "The Stars (Are Out Tonight)" was released as the second single on 26 February. A music video in the form of a short film premiered the previous day, featuring Bowie and actress Tilda Swinton. It entered the charts at number 102 in Britain, which O'Leary attributed to excitement winding down after the first single. Two days later, the album was streamed in its entirety on iTunes. Through ISO Records, and in association with Columbia Records, The Next Day was released over several dates in different regions: 8 March in Australia, New Zealand and several European countries; 11 March in the UK and other territories; 12 March in North America; and 13 March in Japan. Similar to the artist's two previous albums, The Next Day appeared on CD in standard and deluxe editions, the latter featuring the bonus tracks "So She", "Plan" and "I'll Take You There". The double-LP edition included both the bonus tracks and the single deluxe CD, while the Japanese CD included "God Bless the Girl".

On 4 November 2013, the four bonus tracks, plus four previously unreleased tracks and remixes of "Love Is Lost" and "I'd Rather Be High", were released as The Next Day Extra, alongside a DVD of videos for the first four singles. The four previously unreleased songs were unfinished by the time the original sessions concluded; further work on lyrics and vocals were carried out in August. Of the 29 songs recorded for The Next Day, 22 saw official release in 2013. Visconti said the remaining seven tracks were all discarded by 2015, telling Pegg a year later that only one of the tracks had a working title, "Chump", while the rest were identified with numbers related to Bowie's notes.

=== Commercial performance ===
The Next Day debuted at number one on the UK Albums Chart, selling 94,048 copies in its first week. It was Bowie's ninth number-one album in the United Kingdom, and his first since Black Tie White Noise (1993). The album fell to number two the following week, selling 35,671 copies. In its third week, it slipped to number three on sales of 23,157 units. In the United States, the album entered the Billboard 200 at number two with first-week sales of 85,000 copies, earning Bowie his largest sales week for an album in the Nielsen SoundScan era. It debuted behind Bon Jovi's What About Now and became Bowie's best US chart placement to date, beating Station to Station's number three position. The Next Day has sold 208,000 copies in the US as of December 2015.

Elsewhere, The Next Day topped the charts in several countries, including Belgium, Croatia, Czech Republic, Denmark, Finland, Germany, Ireland, New Zealand, Norway, Poland, Portugal, Sweden and Switzerland, (Note: Attributed to multiple references:) and reached number two in Australia, Austria, Canada, France, Italy, and Spain. It peaked at number five in Greece, Hungary and Japan, 13 in Mexico, and 55 in South Korea.

=== Later singles and promotion ===
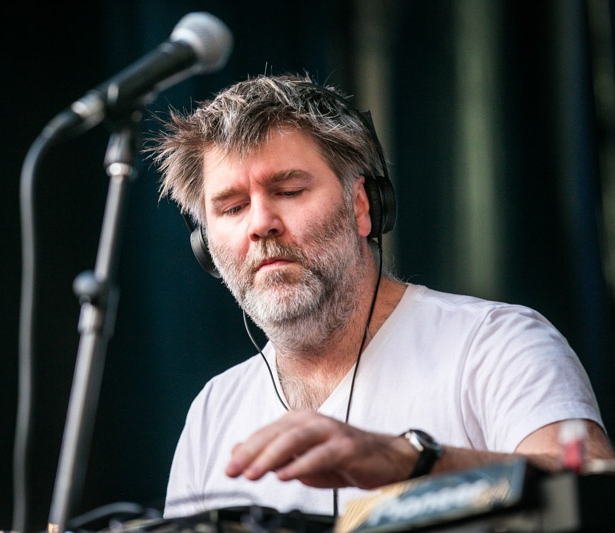
James Murphy (pictured in 2013) remixed "Love Is Lost" in mid-2013, which was released as a single and appeared on The Next Day Extra.

A music video for the title track was released online on 8 May 2013. Featuring actor Gary Oldman as a debauched priest and actress Marion Cotillard, the video challenged Christian teachings and caused short-term outrage related to its themes and messages. Pegg states that in addition to its religious commentary, the video is "yet another dire warning not to place our faith in the hands of ideologues, of prophets, of messiahs, of people who begin by giving you everything that you want." On 17 June, "The Next Day" was released as a 7" single on square white vinyl.

The album's fourth single, "Valentine's Day", was released on 19 August 2013 as a limited 7" vinyl picture disc, with a music video commenting on gun control. "Love Is Lost" was remixed by LCD Soundsystem's James Murphy in mid-2013. (Note: Bowie and Murphy became friends when the former contributed to Arcade Fire's Reflektor (2013).) The full ten-minute remix debuted on 10 October on Shaun Keaveny's BBC Music 6 show and subsequently appeared on The Next Day Extra, while a four-minute edit was unveiled at the Mercury Prize ceremony twenty days later; The Next Day was nominated but lost to James Blake's Overgrown. An accompanying video, directed by Bowie himself and with a total budget of $12.99, debuted the following day. The full-length and edited remix were packaged with the "Venetian Mix" of "I'd Rather Be High" for a limited-edition 12" single, released on 16 December. Bowie also appeared in a Louis Vuitton advertisement with model Arizona Muse where he played a harpsichord and sang "I'd Rather Be High".

In contrast to the heavy promotion for both Heathen and Reality, Bowie did not conduct interviews or play live for The Next Day, the only promotion being the music videos, occasional photoshoots and a list of 42 words sent to novelist Rick Moody, which the artist considered relevant to The Next Day. (Note: Moody wrote the 1994 novel The Ice Storm, the 1997 film adaptation of which featured Bowie's 1997 re-recording of "I Can't Read" over the end credits. Moody told The Rumpus that he requested a "sort of work flow diagram" for the album, assuming he would not receive a response and was surprised when he received a list of words "without further comment".) Visconti spoke about the album on Bowie's behalf and told The Times in January 2013 that Bowie would never conduct another interview again. Leonard added that Bowie was using the album, artwork and videos themselves as artistic statements. The Next Day was nominated for Best Rock Album at the 56th Annual Grammy Awards in 2014, while "The Stars (Are Out Tonight)" was nominated for Best Rock Performance.

== Critical reception ==
Professional ratings
Aggregate scores
Source	Rating
AnyDecentMusic?	8.1/10
Metacritic	81/100
Review scores
Source	Rating
AllMusic	3.5/5 stars
The A.V. Club	A−
The Daily Telegraph	5/5 stars
Entertainment Weekly	B
The Guardian	4/5 stars
The Independent	5/5 stars
NME	4/5 stars
Pitchfork	7.6/10
Rolling Stone	4/5 stars
Spin	5/10

The Next Day was widely acclaimed as Bowie's strongest album since the early 1980s. Metacritic gave a metascore of 81 based on 44 reviews, indicating "universal acclaim". Several critics described it as return to form; (Note: Attributed to multiple references:) Andy Gill praised it as the best comeback in rock history in The Independent. Assessed by Simon Reynolds of The New York Times as Bowie's "twilight masterpiece", commentators deemed it the artist's best and most rewarding work since Scary Monsters and Outside. (Note: Attributed to multiple references:)

The album was described as a dark, bold and creative release for Bowie, and one full of strong songs. Time Out's Oliver Keen welcomed The Next Day as an "intelligent, memorable and even a little provocative" addition to Bowie's discography. In Q magazine, Andrew Harrison applauded "a loud, thrilling, steamrollingly confident rock and roll album full of noise, energy and words that – if as cryptic as ever they were – sound like they desperately need to be sung". Several highlighted the ensemble's performances and Bowie's commitment to the material. (Note: Attributed to multiple references:) Paste's Douglas Heselgrave argued that it is "as if he has rediscovered the joy and satisfaction of writing and performing challenging music".

Many critics praised Bowie's absorption of his musical past to create a modernised sound. (Note: Attributed to multiple references:) Edna Gundersen of USA Today wrote that although his glitter rock, plastic soul and electronica releases of the 1970s remain among his best works, the "elegance, urgency and versatility" of The Next Day prove that "pop music's craftiest chameleon has lost none of his sound [and] vision". Several found the songs densely packed with puzzles that made repeating and rewarding listens for fans, with Record Collector's Jason Draper arguing that the album would reveal itself more and more as time passes.

The album was criticised as overlong, lacking direction and focus at certain points, and lacking in innovation. Spin's Alfred Soto said the collision of different ideas resulted in "colorless abstractions" and criticised Bowie for taking a long hiatus, only to return with an album that sounded like its predecessor. Pitchfork's Ryan Dombal found the music bounces from style to style, "casually suggesting past greatness while rarely matching it". Writing for The Wire, Mark Fisher described the album as mediocre and undeserving of its wide acclaim and publicity, which he wrote "point[ed] to a wider malaise in contemporary music" because it proved that anything of low artistic merit could achieve success via "artfully timed PR".

The Next Day placed on lists ranking the best albums of 2013 by The A.V. Club (10), Consequence of Sound (40), The Guardian (20), NME (10), PopMatters (47), Rolling Stone (16) and Uncut (2).

== Legacy ==
In the build up to The Next Day's release, David Chui of CBS News stated that Bowie's legacy remained untarnished, having nothing more to prove. "But Bowie is simply not another artist who rests on his past laurels. He remains a restless and creative spirit who always looks ahead and not back, as The Next Day indicates. [...] If any lesson is to be learned from Bowie's return, it's that you could never truly count the man out." Petridis hoped Bowie would continue making records, as "listening to a new album by most of his peers makes you wish they'd stick to playing the greatest hits". Bowie's first project following The Next Day was the experimental jazz track "Sue (Or in a Season of Crime)", recorded with bandleader Maria Schneider, and released on the compilation album Nothing Has Changed in 2014. Diagnosed with liver cancer the same year, he recorded his final album, Blackstar, while suffering from the disease. Visconti said Blackstar was the artist's "parting gift" for his fans before his death on 10 January 2016, two days after its release.

The Next Day was among the first surprise albums of the 2010s. According to Pegg, the surprise release of "Where Are We Now?" was the first of its kind by a major artist and the approach was used by artists such as Beyoncé for her albums Beyoncé (2013) and Lemonade (2016). Summarising the significance of the release, Pegg writes:

The fact that he managed to keep The Next Day a secret until the moment of his choosing was little short of miraculous, and within the context of his own career, the 'Where Are We Now?' coup went beyond a simple PR stunt. At a stroke, it transformed his years of silence into a work of art in their own right. To paraphrase that famous line from The Usual Suspects [1995], the greatest trick that David Bowie ever pulled was convincing the world that he'd retired.

In The Complete David Bowie, Pegg commends the album's diverse moods, from the nostalgia of "Where Are We Now?" to the force of the title track. He primarily agrees with critics in praising the performances, particularly Bowie's and Visconti's production, but finds the album overlong and slow in its middle section, which he attributes to the number of tracks. He concludes that "if the only charge to be levelled against The Next Day is that it offers a surfeit of riches, then there's nothing much amiss". O'Leary considers that Bowie could have easily made it a triple album during the analogue age, but as it stands in the streaming era, The Next Day is "a fluctuating set of tracks whose sequence and length depends on the listener's mood and patience".

In 2016, Bryan Wawzenek of Ultimate Classic Rock placed The Next Day at number 13 out of 26 in a list ranking Bowie's studio albums from worst to best, finding "strong songwriting" amid non-innovative but overall enjoyable music. Including Bowie's two albums with Tin Machine, Consequence of Sound ranked The Next Day number 11 out of 28 in a 2018 list, Pat Levy calling it "a late in the game home run for Bowie" and vastly superior to its predecessor. The album was included in the 2014 revised edition of Robert Dimery's book 1001 Albums You Must Hear Before You Die.

=== Remaster ===
A remastered version of The Next Day was released on 12 September 2025 as part of the I Can't Give Everything Away (2002–2016) box set. The set also includes newly remastered versions of other tracks from the period, including The Next Day Extra.

== Track listing ==
All lyrics are written by David Bowie; all music is composed by Bowie, except where noted.

The Next Day – Standard edition
No.	Title	Music	Length
1.	"The Next Day"		3:27
2.	"Dirty Boys"		2:58
3.	"The Stars (Are Out Tonight)"		3:56
4.	"Love Is Lost"		3:57
5.	"Where Are We Now?"		4:08
6.	"Valentine's Day"		3:01
7.	"If You Can See Me"		3:15
8.	"I'd Rather Be High"		3:53
9.	"Boss of Me"	Bowie; Gerry Leonard	4:09
10.	"Dancing Out in Space"		3:24
11.	"How Does the Grass Grow?"	Bowie; Jerry Lordan	4:33
12.	"(You Will) Set the World on Fire"		3:30
13.	"You Feel So Lonely You Could Die"		4:37
14.	"Heat"		4:25
Total length:			53:17

The Next Day – Deluxe edition/Vinyl edition
No.	Title	Music	Length
15.	"So She"		2:31
16.	"Plan"		2:02
17.	"I'll Take You There"	Bowie; Leonard	2:41
Total length:			60:31

The Next Day – Japanese deluxe edition
No.	Title	Length
18.	"God Bless the Girl"	4:11
Total length:		64:42

=== The Next Day Extra ===
The Next Day Extra – 2-CD + DVD edition (disc 2)
No.	Title	Music	Length
1.	"Atomica"		4:05
2.	"Love Is Lost" (Hello Steve Reich Mix by James Murphy for the DFA)		10:24
3.	"Plan"		2:02
4.	"The Informer"		4:31
5.	"I'd Rather Be High" (Venetian Mix)		3:49
6.	"Like a Rocket Man"		3:29
7.	"Born in a UFO"		3:02
8.	"I'll Take You There"	Bowie; Leonard	2:41
9.	"God Bless the Girl"		4:11
10.	"So She"		2:31
Total length:			40:45

The Next Day Extra – 2-CD + DVD edition (DVD)
No.	Title	Length
1.	"Where Are We Now?" (Video)	4:35
2.	"The Stars (Are Out Tonight)" (Video)	5:54
3.	"The Next Day" (Video)	2:59
4.	"Valentine's Day" (Video)	3:09
Total length:		16:37

In addition to the physical release there is a 7-track digital EP bundle that excludes the deluxe edition bonus tracks.

The Next Day Extra EP – Digital edition
No.	Title	Length
1.	"Atomica"	4:05
2.	"Love Is Lost" (Hello Steve Reich Mix by James Murphy for the DFA)	10:24
3.	"The Informer"	4:31
4.	"I'd Rather Be High" (Venetian Mix)	3:49
5.	"Like a Rocket Man"	3:29
6.	"Born in a UFO"	3:02
7.	"God Bless the Girl"	4:11
Total length:		33:31

== Personnel ==
Credits adapted from the liner notes of the deluxe edition of The Next Day.

- David Bowie – vocals (1–15, 17); guitar (1, 16); string arrangement (1, 3, 15); acoustic guitar (3, 13–15, 17); keyboards (4, 5, 7, 10, 11, 15–17); percussion (16)
- Tony Visconti – string arrangement (1, 3, 13–15); guitar (2, 13, 15, 17); recorder (3, 9); strings (5); bass guitar (6, 12, 15)
- Earl Slick – guitar (2, 6, 12)
- Gerry Leonard – guitar (1–5, 7–15, 17); keyboards (15)
- David Torn – guitar (1, 3, 7, 10, 11, 13–15, 17)
- Gail Ann Dorsey – bass guitar (1, 3, 4, 10, 11, 13, 14, 17); backing vocals (3, 7, 9, 11–13, 17)
- Tony Levin – bass guitar (2, 5, 7–9)
- Zachary Alford – drums (1–5, 7–11, 13–17); percussion (7)
- Sterling Campbell – drums (6, 12); tambourine (12)
- Janice Pendarvis – backing vocals (3, 9, 12, 13, 17)
- Steve Elson – baritone saxophone (2, 3, 9); clarinet (3)
- Henry Hey – piano (5, 13)
- Maxim Moston – strings (1, 3, 13–15)
- Antoine Silverman – strings (1, 3, 13–15)
- Anja Wood – strings (1, 3, 13–15)
- Hiroko Taguchi – strings (1, 3, 13–15)

Production

- David Bowie – production (all tracks)
- Tony Visconti – engineering, mixing, production (all tracks)
- Mario J. McNulty – engineering
- Kabir Hermon – assistant engineering
- Brian Thorn – assistant engineering
- Dave McNair – mastering
- Jonathan Barnbrook – cover design
- Jimmy King – photography
- Masayoshi Sukita – original photograph of Bowie for "Heroes"

== Charts ==
=== Weekly charts ===
Weekly chart performance for The Next Day
Chart (2013)	Peak position
Argentine Albums (CAPIF)	1
Australian Albums (ARIA)	2
Austrian Albums (Ö3 Austria)	2
Belgian Albums (Ultratop Flanders)	1
Belgian Albums (Ultratop Wallonia)	1
Canadian Albums (Billboard)	2
Croatian Albums (HDU)	1
Czech Albums (ČNS IFPI)	1
Danish Albums (Hitlisten)	1
Dutch Albums (Album Top 100)	1
Estonian Albums (Raadio 2)	2
Finnish Albums (Suomen virallinen lista)	1
French Albums (SNEP)	2
German Albums (Offizielle Top 100)	1
Greek Albums (IFPI)	5
Hungarian Albums (MAHASZ)	5
Irish Albums (IRMA)	1
Italian Albums (FIMI)	2
Japanese Albums (Oricon)	5
Mexican Albums (Top 100 Mexico)	13
New Zealand Albums (RMNZ)	1
Norwegian Albums (VG-lista)	1
Polish Albums (ZPAV)	1
Portuguese Albums (AFP)	1
Scottish Albums (Official Charts)	1
Slovenian Albums (Slo Top 30)	1
South Korean Albums (Gaon)	55
Spanish Albums (Promusicae)	2
Swedish Albums (Sverigetopplistan)	1
Swiss Albums (Schweizer Hitparade)	1
UK Albums (Official Charts)	1
US Billboard 200	2
US Top Alternative Albums (Billboard)	1
US Top Rock Albums (Billboard)	2

Weekly chart performance for The Next Day Extra EP
Chart (2013-2022)	Peak position
Danish Albums (Hitlisten)	30
Irish Albums (IRMA)	99
Scottish Albums (Official Charts)	29
UK Albums (Official Charts)	89

=== Year-end charts ===
Year-end chart performance for The Next Day
Chart (2013)	Position
Argentine Albums (CAPIF)	52
Australian Albums (ARIA)	100
Austrian Albums (Ö3 Austria)	41
Belgian Albums (Ultratop Flanders)	10
Belgian Albums Chart (Ultratop Wallonia)	15
Danish Albums (Hitlisten)	22
Dutch Albums (Album Top 100)	18
Finnish Albums (Suomen virallinen lista)	3
French Albums (SNEP)	29
German Albums (Offizielle Top 100)	53
Hungarian Albums (MAHASZ)	75
Italian Albums (FIMI)	38
New Zealand Albums (RMNZ)	46
Spanish Albums (PROMUSICAE)	33
Swedish Albums (Sverigetopplistan)	17
Swiss Albums (Schweizer Hitparade)	39
UK Albums (OCC)	26
US Billboard 200	162
US Top Alternative Albums (Billboard)	28
US Top Rock Albums (Billboard)	42

== Certifications ==
Certifications for The Next Day
Region	Certification	Certified units/sales
Australia (ARIA)	Gold	35,000^{^}
Austria (IFPI Austria)	Gold	7,500^{*}
Canada (Music Canada)	Gold	40,000^{^}
Finland (Musiikkituottajat)	Gold	10,951
France (SNEP)	Platinum	100,000^{*}
Germany (BVMI)	Gold	100,000^{^}
Ireland (IRMA)	Gold	7,500^{^}
Italy (FIMI)	Gold	30,000^{*}
Netherlands (NVPI)	Platinum	50,000^{‡}
New Zealand (RMNZ)	Gold	7,500^{^}
Poland (ZPAV)	Gold	10,000^{*}
Portugal (AFP)	3× Platinum	45,000^{^}
Spain (Promusicae)	Gold	20,000^{‡}
Sweden (GLF)	Gold	20,000^{‡}
Switzerland (IFPI Switzerland)	Gold	10,000^{^}
United Kingdom (BPI)	Platinum	300,000^{‡}
^{*} Sales figures based on certification alone.^{^} Shipments figures based on certification alone.^{‡} Sales+streaming figures based on certification alone.
