= Best Laid Plans (David Torn album) =

Studio album by David Torn
- Released: 1984
- Recorded: July 1984
- Genre: Jazz
- Length: 41:17
- Label: ECM 1284
- Producer: Manfred Eicher

David Torn chronology
Best Laid Plans (1984)	Cloud About Mercury (1986)

Best Laid Plans is an album by guitarist David Torn with percussionist Geoffrey Gordon, recorded in July 1984 and released on ECM later that year—Torn's debut.

== Reception ==
The AllMusic review by Glenn Astarita awarded the album four stars, stating "Torn possessed a sound and style on guitar that set him apart from many of his peers... Recommended."

Professional ratings
Review scores
Source	Rating
Allmusic	4/5 stars

== Track listing ==
All compositions by David Torn except as indicated

1. "Before the Bitter Wind" (David Torn, Geoffrey Gordon) - 7:20
2. "Best Laid Plans" - 7:07
3. "The Hum of Its Parts" - 3:40
4. "Removable Tongue" - 1:53
5. "In the Fifth Direction" - 6:20
6. "Two-Face Flash" (Torn, Gordon) - 6:40
7. "Angle of Incidents" - 8:40

== Personnel ==
- David Torn – guitar
- Geoffrey Gordon – percussion
