= Love Is Lost =

2013 song by David Bowie

Song by David Bowie

from the album The Next Day
- Released: 8 March 2013
- Recorded: 2011–2012
- Studio: Magic Shop, New York City; Human Worldwide, New York City
- Genre: Art rock; gothic rock; psychedelic rock
- Length: 3:57
- Label: ISO; Columbia
- Songwriter: David Bowie
- Producers: David Bowie; Tony Visconti

"Love Is Lost" (Hello Steve Reich Mix by James Murphy for the DFA)

Single by David Bowie

from the album The Next Day Extra
- B-side: "I'd Rather Be High" (Venetian Mix); James Murphy Remix (Edit)
- Released: 16 December 2013
- Genre: Electronic
- Length: 10:24 (full version); 4:07 (short edit)
- Label: ISO; Columbia
- Songwriter: David Bowie
- Producers: David Bowie; James Murphy; Tony Visconti

David Bowie singles chronology
"Valentine's Day" (2013)	"Love Is Lost" (Hello Steve Reich Mix by James Murphy for the DFA) (2013)	"Sue (Or in a Season of Crime)" / "'Tis a Pity She Was a Whore" (2014)

Music videos
- "Love Is Lost" (Hello Steve Reich Mix by James Murphy for the DFA - Edit on YouTube
- "Love Is Lost" (Hello Steve Reich Mix by James Murphy for the DFA) on YouTube

"Love Is Lost" is a song by rock musician David Bowie from his album The Next Day. James Murphy's "Hello Steve Reich Mix for the DFA" was released as the fifth single from Bowie's 24th studio album The Next Day as a promotion for The Next Day Extra, a special edition of bonus tracks, remixes, and music videos. The remix version of the song contains cut and looped samples from a new recording of Steve Reich's 1972 piece Clapping Music performed by Murphy and three other musicians, plus a sample from Bowie's 1980 song "Ashes to Ashes".

== Release details ==
The single release is an edited version of the remix by James Murphy of LCD Soundsystem.

Bowie debuted the video at the Mercury Prize ceremony on 30 October 2013, where The Next Day was on the list for Album of the Year.

A 12" limited edition white vinyl version of single was released on 16 December, which included the remix by James Murphy and the Venetian Mix of "I'd Rather Be High" (also from The Next Day), a song that was also featured in Louis Vuitton's high-profile "Voyage" campaign, which included Bowie himself in a leading role.

"I'd Rather Be High" received a new anti-war video from Bowie in November and was added to the playlists of UK's Absolute Radio, BBC Radio 6 and BBC Radio 2 in December 2013.

== Music videos ==
Assisted by photographer Jimmy King and long-time personal assistant Corinne "Coco" Schwab, Bowie wrote, shot, and edited the music video himself for a cost of US$12.99, the cost of the flash drive he had to buy to save the video on his camera. The entire video was recorded by Bowie in his Manhattan apartment during the weekend prior to its Internet release. The wooden puppets of Pierrot and The Thin White Duke were produced by Jim Henson's Creature Shop for an unfinished and unreleased music video for "The Pretty Things Are Going to Hell". The price of these puppets was not included in the video budget.

Barnaby Roper directed the video for the 10-minute remix. It contains polygons and wireframes that eventually form into a nude couple embracing.

== Track listing ==
- ISO/Columbia — 44–102199

Side A
No.	Title	Length
1.	"Love Is Lost" (Hello Steve Reich Mix by James Murphy for the DFA)	10:24

Side B
No.	Title	Length
1.	"I'd Rather Be High" (Venetian Mix)	3:49
2.	"Love Is Lost" (Hello Steve Reich Mix by James Murphy for the DFA)	4:07

== Personnel ==
According to Chris O'Leary:

- David Bowie – lead and backing vocal, organ, keyboards
- Gail Ann Dorsey – bass guitar
- Gerry Leonard – guitar
- Zachary Alford – drums
- James Murphy, Matthew Thornley, Hisham Bharoocha and Jordan Hebert – "clapping chorus" (remix versions)

Technical

- David Bowie – producer
- Tony Visconti – producer, engineer
- Mario J. McNulty – engineer
- James Murphy – producer, engineer (remix)

== Release history ==
Region	Date	Label	Format	Catalogue no.
Europe	16 December 2013	ISO; Columbia	12"	44–102199
