= Prezens =

Studio album by David Torn
- Released: 2007
- Recorded: March 2005
- Studio: Clubhouse Studios; Rhinebeck, New York
- Genre: Jazz, Experimental
- Length: 72:38
- Label: ECM; ECM 1877
- Producer: David Torn

David Torn chronology
Pandora's Toolbox (2004)	Prezens (2007)	Only Sky (2014)

Prezens is an album by guitarist David Torn recorded in March 2005 and released on ECM in 2007.

== Reception ==
The AllMusic review by Thom Jurek awarded the album 4½ stars stating "Prezens is one of those recordings where free improvisation and composition find an uneasy but cooperative working relationship making for one compelling listen after another."

Professional ratings
Review scores
Source	Rating
Allmusic	4.5/5 stars

== Track listing ==
All compositions by David Torn except as indicated

1. "AK" (Tim Berne, Tom Rainey, Craig Taborn, David Torn) – 9:19
2. "Rest & Unrest" – 3:45
3. "Structural Functions of Prezens" (Berne, Rainey, Taborn, Torn) – 10:58
4. "Bulbs" (Berne, Rainey, Taborn, Torn) – 6:21
5. "Them Buried Standing" – 2:43
6. "Sink" (Berne, Rainey, Taborn, Torn) – 7:16
7. "Neck-Deep in the Harrow..." (Berne, Rainey, Taborn, Torn) – 12:33
8. "Ever More Other" – 4:13
9. "Ring for Endless Travel" – 2:24
10. "Miss Place, The Mist..." (Matt Chamberlain, Torn) – 5:46
11. "Transmit Regardless" (Berne, Rainey, Taborn, Torn) – 7:20

== Personnel ==
- David Torn – guitars, live-sampling and manipulation
- Tim Berne – alto saxophone
- Craig Taborn – Fender Rhodes, Hammond B3, mellotron, bent circuits
- Matt Chamberlain (track 10), Tom Rainey (tracks 1–9 & 11) – drums
