= The Other Me (2022 film) =

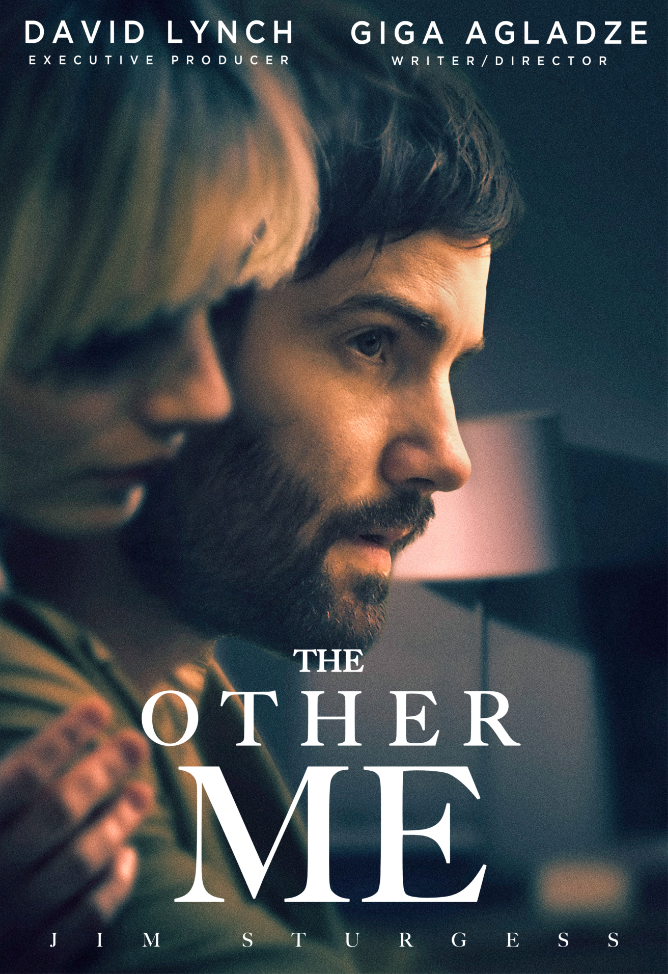
- Official poster
- Directed by: Giga Agladze
- Written by: Giga Agladze
- Produced by: David Lynch; Giga Agladze; Max Gottlieb; Jonathan P. Shaw; Joanna Plafsky; Vano Bakradze; Gia Bazgadze; Lasha Mindiashvili
- Starring: Jim Sturgess; Andreja Pejic; Antonia Campbell-Hughes; Rhona Mitra; Orla Brady; Jordi Mollà; Michael Socha; Roger Ashton-Griffiths; Mark W. Travis; Mike Gassaway
- Music by: Paul Haslinger
- Production companies: BA Production; The Fun Group
- Distributed by: Gravitas Ventures
- Release date: February 4, 2022 (United States)
- Running time: 99 minutes
- Country: United States
- Language: English

The Other Me is a 2022 American mystery drama film directed by Giga Agladze, in his feature directorial debut, with David Lynch serving as executive producer. Filming took place in the country of Georgia. It received mixed reviews.

== Plot ==
Irakli, a reclusive and introspective architect, begins experiencing strange visual disturbances. He is diagnosed with a rare eye condition that allows him to see people’s true motives and inner selves—an ability that blurs the line between reality and perception. As his visions intensify, they begin to disrupt his daily life, pushing him into a surreal and often disorienting reality.

Haunted by these revelations, Irakli becomes increasingly isolated until he meets a mysterious woman named Nino. She seems to understand his condition and offers him guidance. Their connection deepens, and through her, Irakli begins a journey of self-discovery. Nino helps him confront buried emotions and unresolved questions about his identity.

As Irakli navigates this altered reality, he encounters a series of enigmatic characters, each representing different facets of human nature and existential struggle. These interactions challenge his understanding of truth, love, and selfhood. The film gradually reveals that Irakli’s journey is not just about his eye condition—it’s a metaphor for uncovering his authentic self.

The story culminates in a revelation tied to gender identity and personal transformation. Irakli must come to terms with who he truly is, beyond societal expectations and surface appearances. The film ends on a contemplative note, leaving viewers with questions about perception, identity, and the nature of reality.

== Cast ==
- Jim Sturgess as Irakli
- Andreja Pejic as Nino
- Antonia Campbell-Hughes as Nutsa
- Roger Ashton-Griffiths as Stranger
- Billy Barratt as Niazi
- Orla Brady as Marina
- Rhona Mitra as Martha
- Jordi Mollà as Vakho
- Michael Socha as Giorgi
- Mark W. Travis as Doctor
- Mike Gassaway as George

== Critical reception ==
The Other Me has an approval rating of 45% based on 11 professional reviews on the review aggregator website Rotten Tomatoes. In his Variety review of the film, Dennis Harvey criticized the movie for its lack of real-world logic, poorly developed subplots, failure to portray Sturgess' character as a 'frustrated great artist' as presumed. He noted that Pejic was "out of depth playing the kind of cipher role that might easily flummox a more practiced performer" and the film's low-quality widescreen images which are edited as a patchwork. He also noted that the film's story was full of aimless detours with deliberate misdirection before it reached the end towards its supposed central theme of gender dysphoria. He opined that undeveloped ideas came packaged in abstract images and bold editorial gambits.

In AIPTcomics review, Nathaniel Muir says that "[d]espite its seemingly simple premise, there is a lot to The Other Me. This includes an overabundance of characters and some subplots that mean little to the overall plot. At its core, there is a fascinating tale about discovery, but there is a lot of going happening around the edges, also. The story encourages repeat viewings; it is unfortunate the movie does not." He also noted that the film was composed with a touch of sexuality, which was felt throughout the plot, which might not be necessarily required for the story.
