= Only Sky =

Studio album by David Torn
- Released: May 4, 2015
- Recorded: February 2014; Experimental Media and Performing Arts Center Concert Hall in Troy, NY and Cell Labs, NYC
- Genre: Jazz, Experimental
- Length: 76:10
- Label: ECM ECM 2433
- Producer: David Torn

David Torn chronology
Prezens (2005)	Only Sky (2015)

Only Sky is a solo album by guitarist David Torn recorded in 2014 and released on the ECM label.

== Reception ==
Professional ratings
Review scores
Source	Rating
Allmusic	4/5 stars
All About Jazz	5/5 stars
The Guardian	4/5 stars

Allmusic awarded the album 4 stars and the review by Sean Westergaard states "Although there's a hovering ambience to all these pieces, this isn't new agey ambience: the pieces are sometimes ominous or uneasy with Torn producing guitar-like tones and very un-guitar-like tones and sometimes manipulating the loops in a not-so-subtle way. ...Only Sky isn't an album that will appeal to everyone, but those interested in the outer limits of guitar and looping should check this one out". The All About Jazz review states, "Beyond all the usual suspects, Torn has long incorporated concepts from other cultures as well, whether it's in the snaky manner that he constructs Middle Eastern-informed phrases or his ability to use a whammy bar to create sonics that so resemble a human voice that the only other guitarist who can match him in this regard is Jeff Beck." The Guardian's John Fordham said "Only Sky, is a vast, stormy, sometimes folksy, sometimes splinteringly Hendrixian soundscape, created in real time by his guitar, electric oud and electronic gizmos alone, and it’s full of startling turns".

== Track listing ==
All compositions by David Torn

1. "At Least There Was Nothing" - 7:48
2. "Spoke With Folks" - 6:46
3. "OK, Shorty" - 3:18
4. "Was a Cave There..." - 12:40
5. "Reaching Barely, Sparely Fraught" - 8:11
6. "I Could Almost See the Room" - 13:25
7. "Only Sky" - 9:15
8. "So Much What" - 5:22
9. "A Goddamned Specific Unbalance" - 9:13

== Personnel ==
- David Torn - guitars, oud, live-sampling and manipulation
