= GTR OBLQ =

Live album by Vernon Reid, Elliott Sharp, and David Torn
- Released: 1998
- Venue: Knitting Factory, New York City
- Genre: Experimental
- Length: 1:00:45
- Label: Knitting Factory; KFR-233

GTR OBLQ (also referred to as Gtr Oblq or Guitar Oblique) is a live album by guitarists Vernon Reid, Elliott Sharp, and David Torn. It was recorded at the Knitting Factory in New York City, and was released in 1998 by Knitting Factory Works.

According to Reid, the album is "the sound of three people listening to one another and reacting in the moment. It's a real give-and-take situation, where no one personality dominates."

== Reception ==
Professional ratings
Review scores
Source	Rating
AllMusic	4/5 stars
The Encyclopedia of Popular Music	3/5 stars

In a review for AllMusic, Tom Schulte wrote: "Experimental, ambient, and multi-layered, the work of this trio is an otherworldly headspace untethered by a rhythm section. An exploration of dissonance and melody, effected guitars, and the interaction of the dissimilar, this trio's work is an impressive free-guitar alchemy from three of the instrument's most prolific and innovative players."

Glenn Astarita of All About Jazz stated: "GTR OBLQ takes us into the 21st Century with digital loops, limitless EFX, electronic rhythms, sonic mayhem and stunning electric guitar expertise... GTR OBLQ is a staggering exhibition of three electronic guitar heroes developing and expanding upon unorthodox concepts that for the most part, seem 'unclassifiable'."

Writing for Billboard, Steve Graybow commented: "GTR OBLQ provides a fascinating look into an exceptionally rich musical dialogue. The perceptive observer can detect a conversational ebb and flow in the music, as the three guitarists spontaneously react to one another."

== Track listing ==
1. "The Sentinel" (Vernon Reid) – 11:47
2. "Achrono Mites" (David Torn) – 10:14
3. "Slightly East" (Elliott Sharp) – 11:55
4. "Reflection Of" (Elliott Sharp) – 10:29
5. "Vidya & Itch" (David Torn) – 6:11
6. "Xenomorph" (Vernon Reid) – 5:39
7. "Valse Oblique" (David Torn, Elliott Sharp, Vernon Reid) – 4:30

== Personnel ==
- Vernon Reid – guitar
- Elliott Sharp – guitar
- David Torn – guitar
