= Where Are We Now? =

2013 song by David Bowie

Single by David Bowie

from the album The Next Day
- Released: 8 January 2013
- Recorded: September–October 2011
- Studio: Magic Shop, New York City
- Genre: Art rock
- Length: 4:08
- Label: ISO; Columbia
- Songwriter: David Bowie
- Producers: David Bowie; Tony Visconti

David Bowie singles chronology
"Golden Years David Bowie vs KCRW" (2011)	"Where Are We Now?" (2013)	"The Stars (Are Out Tonight)" (2013)

Music video
- "Where Are We Now?" on YouTube

"Where Are We Now?" is a song by the English musician David Bowie. Recorded in secret between September and October 2011 at the Magic Shop in New York City, it was released by ISO and Columbia Records as the lead single of his 25th studio album The Next Day on iTunes on 8 January 2013, Bowie's 66th birthday. It was accompanied by a music video directed by Tony Oursler, which was posted on Bowie's website. According to producer Tony Visconti, the timing of the release was Bowie's idea, and the single was simply "dropped" in iTunes for fans to discover, with no prior warning or fanfare.

Upon its release, "Where Are We Now?" received significant news coverage; it was Bowie's first release of new material since Reality (2003). It garnered acclaim from music critics, many of whom praised the song's reflective lyrics and somber quality, and deemed it a welcome return for the artist after a decade-long hiatus. It topped the iTunes charts in numerous countries and peaked at number six on the UK Singles Chart, making it Bowie's biggest hit since "Absolute Beginners" in 1986 and his last top ten hit before his death in January 2016.

== Composition and recording ==
The backing track for "Where Are We Now?" was recorded on 13 September 2011 at the Magic Shop in New York City, with overdubs recorded later. Pianist Henry Hay said of the recording: "'Where Are We Now?' is the very first track that I played on, on my first day of working with [Bowie]. [He] had played a good bit of the body of the song on piano, and so what ended up on the album was a combination of his playing and my playing – bits and pieces. I believe that I played the entirety of the ending portion. The whole process was very organic." Bowie recorded his lead vocal on 22 October 2011.

Musically, "Where Are We Now?" is an art rock song. The lyrics are simple and repetitive, an older person reminiscing about time spent and time wasted: "Had to get the train / from Potsdamer Platz / you never knew that / that I could do that / just walking the dead", the last line of which, in the video, produces a grimace in the singer. He grimaces again just after: "A man lost in time near KaDeWe / just walking the dead", which precedes the refrain: "Where are we now / where are we now?" Chris Roberts called it a "spectral, frail yearning without chest-beating, candid in its few, clipped phrases and sighs concerning the heart's filthy lessons."

Graphic designer Jonathan Barnbrook, who created the cover for The Next Day, wrote that the song is a "comparison between Berlin when the wall fell and Berlin today".

Producer Tony Visconti said "I think it's a very reflective track for David. He certainly is looking back on his Berlin period and it evokes this feeling... it's very melancholy, I think. It's the only track on the album that goes this much inward for him".

== Artwork ==
The single's cover artwork, like its parent album, was designed by Jonathan Barnbrook. In Pegg's words, the monochrome upside-down image depicts "a stick-thin [Bowie] leaning at a 45-degree angle with his microphone stand," performing at the Radio City Music Hall in New York City in the fall of 1974. It was originally intended to be the artwork for The Next Day but was passed over in favour of a modified version of the "Heroes" artwork.

== Release ==
Prior to the single's release, Bowie had released no new material for ten years, since 2003's Reality, or performed live since 2006, and it was generally believed by then that he had effectively retired. However, on the morning of his 66th birthday, 8 January 2013, the video for "Where Are We Now?" appeared on YouTube, along with information on his website about his upcoming album The Next Day. "Where Are We Now?" was also made available for purchase on iTunes the same day. The release was unusual in that it was issued with no promotion at all, with fans discovering the existence of the single themselves. Regarding the surprise release, producer Tony Visconti said "It was [Bowie's] idea to just drop it at midnight on his birthday and just let things avalanche." Visconti however, thought it was an "odd choice" for an opening single.

"They wanted it to look like there had been no pre-planning. This thing was going to just drop from the sky – David Bowie just reappears...This is a serious cultural moment which deserves headlines."

— Alan Edwards explaining the pre-release in the 2016 documentary Music Mongels

For the two years preceding its release, Bowie had kept his return to the studio private, with only those directly involved in his inner circle aware. Like fans, record executives and journalists were not informed until the last minute. According to biographer Nicholas Pegg, Alan Edwards of the Outside Organisation, who for years was in charge of Bowie's PR in the UK, was told of the single's existence only four days in advance. With little time to plan, Edwards informed some of his most trusted journalist colleagues to run headlines on the morning of release to appear as though there had been no pre-planning. The release also came as a surprise to bassist Tony Levin, who heard "Where Are We Now?" for the first time on the radio following release.

Within hours of release, Bowie had made headlines around the world with the single and pre-orders for The Next Day topping the iTunes charts, eventually charting at number six on the UK Singles Chart. Despite the media attention surrounding the surprise release, Bowie made no media appearances whatsoever, with Visconti instead taking media requests and accepting an interviewer's suggestion that he was Bowie's "voice on earth". According to Chris O'Leary, when conducting pre-release interviews, Visconti and the other musicians went at great lengths to discuss the "anomalousness" of "Where Are We Now?" and describe the music on the upcoming album as "uptempo, guitar-fat and loud."

After listening to "Where Are We Now?", Eric Clapton sent a note to Bowie thanking him "for writing such a beautiful song". Bowie's response, "Thanks for the shoutout, old sock. Really appreciate it", led Clapton to naming his then-upcoming album Old Sock with Bowie's permission.

== Critical reception ==
Upon its release, "Where Are We Now?" received critical acclaim. Lucy Jones of NME gave unanimous praise to the single, complimenting its songwriting, calling it an "earworm", and describing it as one of Bowie's best: "You'll see this on greatest hits compilations in a couple of years." Annie Zalenski of Ultimate Classic Rock similarly called the song an earworm, praising the somber quality of the music and Bowie's voice. Zalenski further noted that the song doesn't portray Bowie in a persona like his prior work, but simply as himself – "Human Bowie" – writing, "It's perhaps an odd place for the untouchable icon to be – but, somehow, the persona suits him well." Writing for Pitchfork, Mark Richardson voted "Where Are We Now?" as the magazine's "Best New Track". He noted the age in Bowie's voice, writing: "his voice is weary and wise...it's a little disconcerting at first...but the scotch-soaked after-hours musical backing gives it the perfect context." Regarding the title, Richardson states: "'Where are we now?' is a question Bowie wouldn't have asked in the same way in the 1970s; back then he might have expected an answer but now he's old enough to understand that you never really figure it out."

Many critics praised the song as a welcoming return for the artist after a decade long hiatus. In a positive review, Gary Graff of Billboard described the song's sound as reminiscent of his "Berlin Trilogy" and ultimately called it "a gentle but certainly welcome return of the Thin White Duke." Andy Gill of The Independent similarly noted the "reflective" lyrics about the artist's time living in Berlin and the "melancholy" sound. Giving the song and its accompanying video a positive review, Gill praised the "subtle touches of auto-tuning" in the chorus that add to the feeling of fragility and concluded, "like many Bowie songs, the evanescent but beautiful melody comes to haunt you the more you hear it". David Hajdu of The New Republic praised the song as a welcome return to the spotlight and similarly complimented the reflectiveness in the lyrics, writing: "With 'Where Are We Now,' Bowie makes clear that where he wants to be is a place in his creative past." Writing for The Daily Telegraph, Neil McCormick further praised "Where Are We Now?"'s unexpected release, calling it "the most surprising, perfect and welcome comeback in rock history." The magazine later placed it at number 19 in a list of Bowie's 20 greatest songs in 2021. In a 2016 list ranking every Bowie single from worst to best, Ultimate Classic Rock placed "Where Are We Now?" at number 57, noting that the song's impact is stronger on the album.

== Commercial performance ==
The single made it to the top of the charts in eight countries on the day of its release. It was number one on the British iTunes chart by 3 pm that day. It was at first deemed ineligible for placement on other British singles charts because, in addition to being sold separately, the song was also free to those who pre-purchased The Next Day on iTunes, making the sales difficult to separate. The Official Charts Company resolved the issue, and on 13 January the song entered the UK Singles Chart at number six, Bowie's highest charting single there since "Absolute Beginners" reached number two in 1986. It is his first UK top-ten single since "Jump They Say" in 1993. His first top-ten hit was in the UK in 1969 with "Space Oddity."

The Next Day was number one on the iTunes charts in 17 countries on 8 January: Austria, Belgium, Canada, Denmark, Finland, France, Germany, Greece, Iceland, Italy, Luxembourg, Netherlands, Portugal, Spain, Sweden, Switzerland and the United Kingdom. It made the top 10 in Australia, Japan, New Zealand, Norway and the United States on the same day.

== Music video ==
The music video, directed by Tony Oursler, shows Bowie and an unnamed female companion as conjoined "face in a hole" puppets sitting on a suitcase, Bowie with the "permanently anxious eyes of the elderly Duke of Windsor," as Robert Everett-Green put it. The woman was later confirmed as artist Jacqueline Humphries, Oursler's wife. Bowie and Oursler reportedly wanted someone who looked like Bowie's PA, Corinne "Coco" Schwab, as she did in the 1970s in Berlin, where she, Bowie and Iggy Pop would hang out together.

Bowie and Humphries as conjoined puppets

The video is set in what could be an artists' studio in Berlin, where Bowie lived from 1976, showing moving black-and-white footage of the city from the 1970s on a screen. It opens with a shot of a large diamond and an empty picture frame lying on the floor, before moving into a studio containing a mishmash of items, possibly from Bowie's own life or apartment in Berlin: there are mannequins, bottles, an egg, an eyeball on a shelf, a crystal, a snowflake, and a giant blue ear. Bowie is seen toward the end of the video wearing jeans, and a T-shirt that reads "m/s Song of Norway". Sophie Heawood writes that Song of Norway (1970) was a film (based on the operetta) that Bowie's girlfriend at the time, Hermione Farthingale, left him to appear in.

The footage on the screen and references in the lyrics include the Berlin Wall and mention of the Bösebrücke, the first border crossing that opened when the Wall fell on 9 November 1989; 20,000 East Germans crossed over during the first hour the border was unofficially opened, wondering whether it was safe. The lyrics read: "twenty thousand people / Cross Bösebrücke / Fingers are crossed / just in case." Other reference points in the video and song are the Brandenburg Gate; the Dschungel nightclub; its location in Nürnberger Straße; the nearby department store KaDeWe; the Fernsehturm, or television tower; graffiti from Kunsthaus Tacheles, an art centre; Potsdamer Platz railway station; the Reichstag, where the Bundestag sits; the Siegessäule, or Victory Column; and the auto supply shop below the apartment in which Bowie lived.

== Personnel ==
According to biographer Chris O'Leary:

- David Bowie – lead vocals, keyboards
- Henry Hey – piano
- Gerry Leonard – lead guitar
- Tony Levin – bass
- Zachary Alford – drums
- Tony Visconti – string arrangement

== Charts ==
Weekly chart performance for "Where Are We Now?"
Chart (2013)	Peak position
Australia (ARIA)	78
Austria (Ö3 Austria Top 40)	40
Belgium (Ultratop 50 Flanders)	5
Belgium (Ultratop 50 Wallonia)	7
Canada Hot 100 (Billboard)	59
Denmark (Tracklisten)	2
Euro Digital Song Sales (Billboard)	2
France (SNEP)	9
Germany (GfK)	47
Greece Digital Songs (Billboard)	9
Iceland (Tonlist)	30
Ireland (IRMA)	9
Israel International Airplay (Media Forest)	10
Italy (FIMI)	10
Japan Hot 100 (Billboard)	21
Japan Hot Overseas (Billboard)	3
Mexico Ingles Airplay (Billboard)	19
Netherlands (Dutch Top 40)	28
Netherlands (Single Top 100)	7
Portugal (Billboard)	1
Scottish Singles Sales (Official Charts)	11
South Korea International Singles (Gaon)	132
Spain (Promusicae)	9
Switzerland (Schweizer Hitparade)	53
UK Singles (Official Charts)	6
US Bubbling Under Hot 100 Singles (Billboard)	16

=== Year-end charts ===
2013 year-end chart performance for "Where Are We Now?"
Chart (2013)	Peak position
Netherlands (Dutch Top 40)	184

== See also ==
- History of Berlin
