= B.L.U.E. Nights =

Live album by Bruford Levin Upper Extremities
- Released: 2000
- Recorded: April and December 1998
- Venue: Various
- Genre: Jazz fusion
- Length: 1:46:47
- Label: Papa Bear Records
- Producer: Tony Levin

Bruford Levin Upper Extremities chronology
Bruford Levin Upper Extremities (1998)	B.L.U.E. Nights (2000)

B.L.U.E. Nights is a live album by Bruford Levin Upper Extremities, recorded on two 1998 “mini-tours” of North America, and released on Tony Levin's Papa Bear Records label in 2000. It features bassist Levin, guitarist David Torn, trumpeter Chris Botti, and drummer Bill Bruford playing instrumentals that blend jazz, rock, and experimental music. Some of the pieces were improvised in concert.

== Reception ==
Professional ratings
Review scores
Source	Rating
AllMusic	4/5 stars

In a review for AllMusic, Gary Hill stated that the album "showcases the band's unique blend of jazzy modes with Crimson-esque textures and, occasionally, just plain weirdness," and noted: "the whole of this group, despite each member's separate abilities, is so much more than the sum of the parts."

Martin Hutchinson of The Bolton News wrote: "Throughout the live set there is some pretty nifty improvisations to delight the hard-core jazz fans. It's a superb memento of a unique set of dates."

Writing for MWE3, Robert Silverstein called the album "a feast of skillfully recorded progressive instrumental music showcasing how well these ingenious musicians perform live together," and commented: "As far as improvised ambient jazz-fusion goes, it doesn't get any better than BLUE Nights."

== Track listing ==
=== Disc 1 ===
1. "Piercing Glances" – 7:50
2. "Etude Revisited" – 5:28
3. "A Palace of Pearls" – 5:59
4. "Original Sin" – 8:13
5. "Dentures of The Gods" – 6:26
6. "Deeper Blue" – 6:31
7. "Cobalt Canyons" – 7:29

=== Disc 2 ===
1. "Fin de Siècle" – 5:48
2. "Picnic on Vesuvius" – 9:29
3. "Cerulean Sea" – 7:04
4. "Bent Taqasim / Torn Drumbass" – 5:42
5. "Cracking the Midnight Glass" – 6:53
6. "Presidents Day" – 6:46
7. "3 Minutes of Pure Entertainment" – 11:03
8. "Outer Blue" – 6:06

== Personnel ==
- Bill Bruford — drums
- Tony Levin — bass guitars, stick
- Chris Botti — trumpet
- David Torn — guitars, loops, oud
