= Everyman Band =

American jazz fusion group

Everyman Band was an American jazz fusion group active in the early 1980s and featuring Marty Fogel on saxophones, Bruce Yaw on bass, Michael Suchorsky on drums and David Torn on guitar. The band's origins lay in Lou Reed's backing band in the late 1970s with various members (with the exception of Torn) appearing on Coney Island Baby (1975), Rock and Roll Heart (1976), Street Hassle (1978), and The Bells (1979) and the live album Live: Take No Prisoners (1978). Michael Suchorsky continued playing with Reed until 1980's Growing Up in Public album and tour.

== Discography ==
- 1982: Everyman Band (ECM)
- 1985: Without Warning (ECM)
