= David Torn =

American guitarist, composer, and producer (born 1953)

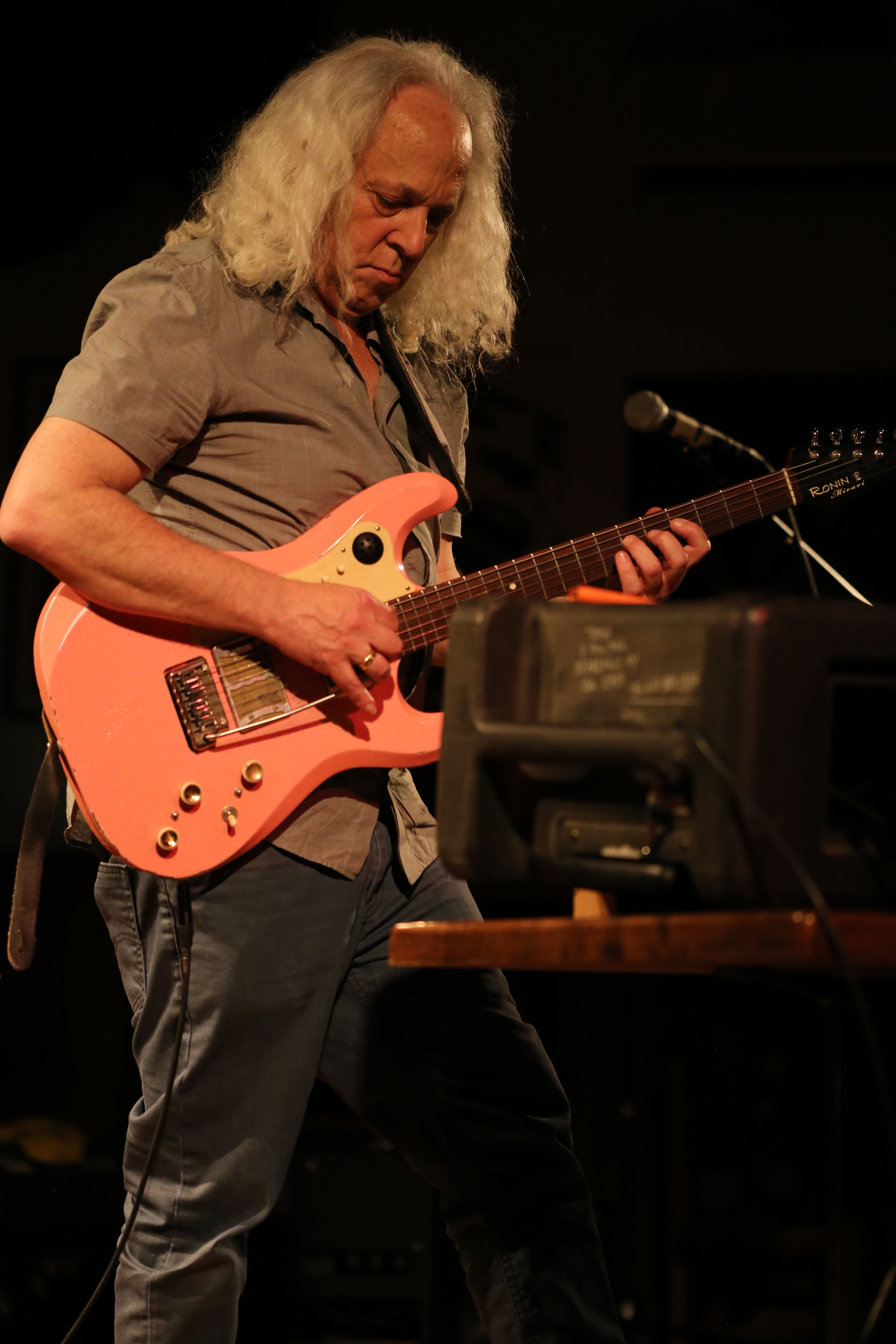
- Torn in 2015

Background information
- Born: May 26, 1953 (age 73); Amityville, New York, U.S.
- Genres: Jazz rock, experimental rock
- Occupations: Musician, producer
- Instrument: Guitar
- Label: ECM
- Website: davidtorn.net

David M. Torn (born May 26, 1953) is an American guitarist, composer, and producer. He is known for combining electronic and acoustic instruments and for his use of looping.

== Background ==
Torn has contributed to recordings by artists as diverse as David Bowie, k.d. lang, John Legend, Madonna, Tori Amos, Bill Bruford, Tony Levin, Mick Karn, David Sylvian, Chocolate Genius, Michael Shrieve, Steve Roach, Patrick O'Hearn, Andy Rinehart, Matt Chamberlain, Meshell Ndegeocello, Tim Berne, and Don Cherry.

In addition to his composition work, Torn's music has been featured in a wide variety of films, including Friday Night Lights, Velvet Goldmine, Adaptation, The Big Lebowski, The Departed, Fur, The Hoax, Kalifornia, Traffic, Reversal of Fortune, Tibet, and Three Kings. He studied with Leonard Bernstein (within the "Music for Young Composers" series), as well as with guitarists John Abercrombie, Pat Martino, Paul Weiss, and Arthur Basile. Torn works out of his personal studios, known as Cell Labs; occasionally, he uses the pseudonym "splattercell."

The New York Times described Torn's 2015 solo release, Only Sky, as "[an abstract landscape that is] both immersive and deftly disorienting."

== Biography ==
Torn was born in Amityville, New York, He is married to Linda B. Brecht-Torn (b. 1952). David Torn is the son of Lawrence J. Torn (1926-2017) and Rhoda G. Torn (1927-2010); he is the father of electronic musician Elijah B. Torn (b. 1979) and Cody M. Torn (b. 1983). He is the brother of Marsha Torn and Linda Torn, and he was a cousin of actor Rip Torn (1931-2019). He is the cousin of Angelica Torn (b. 1964).

Torn began his career with the Ithaca-based jam band Zobo Funn Band in the 1970s, and rose to prominence as a member of The Everyman Band and Jan Garbarek's quartet in the mid-1980s. He has recorded solo and group recordings for the ECM, Windham Hill, CMP and 75 Ark labels.

In the 1990s, Torn was diagnosed with an acoustic neuroma, in his case, a life-threatening form of brain tumor. The surgery that followed left him deaf in the right ear but he remains able to compose, record, and play. He mixes many widely available recordings himself, although according to him this requires sitting sideways to the studio speakers and "visualising the stereo aspects of sound" in his head rather than experimenting with them by ear.

In 2006, Torn's film score for Believe in Me won the Best Score-award at the Jackson Hole Film Festival. In 2003, his score for the film The Order was nominated for a Grammy Award.

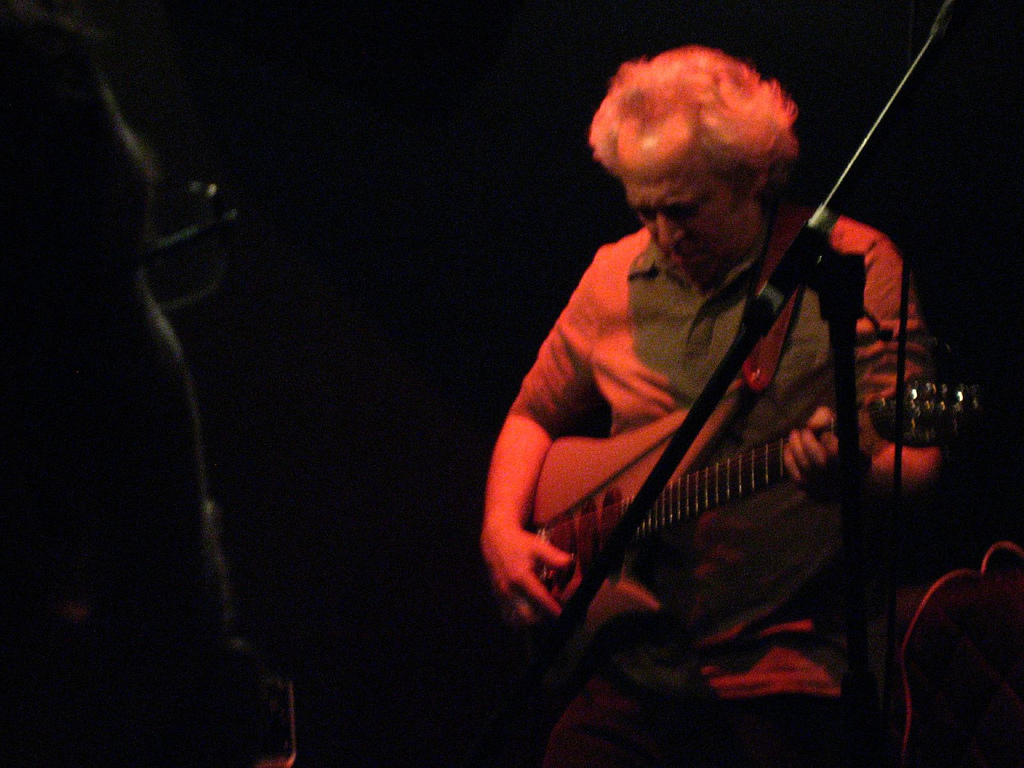
Torn in 2008

In 2007, Torn released Prezens with Tim Berne. Jazzwise called the album "a vibrating collage full of shimmering sonic shapes, a dark, urban electronic soundscape–a potent mix of jazz, free-form rock and technology that is both demanding and rewarding."

In 2013, Torn performed as a guitarist on David Bowie's penultimate album, The Next Day—his third collaboration with the artist. In the same year, Torn had a solo guitar performance and talk at TEDx Caltech 2013: The Brain. The presentation examined his brain tumor diagnosis and recovery.

== Instruments and effects ==
As a session artist, composer, and producer, David Torn has experimented with many effects boxes, amplifiers, and instruments, and he has spoken with amplifier designers and pedal builders about their craft. In an interview with Premier Guitar magazine following the release of his solo album Only Sky, he shared an extensive list of the instruments and effects he uses. He plays a Ronin Mirari guitar with Foilbucker pickups and also lists a large number of amplifiers such as a Fryette Aether amplifier, and many guitar effects pedals including the TC Electronic Classic TC XII Phaser, Catalinbread Antichthon, DigiTech Whammy, and the Neunaber Stereo Wet Reverb.

== Discography ==
=== As leader/co-leader ===
- Best Laid Plans with Geoffrey Gordon (ECM, 1985)
- Cloud About Mercury (ECM, 1987)
- Door X (Windham Hill, 1990)
- Polytown with Mick Karn & Terry Bozzio (CMP Records, 1994)
- Tripping: Over: God (CMP, 1995)
- What Means Solid, Traveller? (CMP, 1996)
- Gtr Oblq with Vernon Reid & Elliott Sharp (Knitting Factory, 1998)
- Ah - Remikses as Splattercell (CellDivision, 2000)
- Oah as Splattercell (CellDivision, 2000)
- Prezens with Tim Berne, Craig Taborn & Tom Rainey (ECM, 2007)
- Levin Torn White with Tony Levin & Alan White (Lazy Bones, 2011)
- Only Sky (ECM, 2015)
- Sun of Goldfinger with Tim Berne & Ches Smith (ECM, 2019)
- Fur/Torn (Screwgun, 2020)
- Now I Imagine A Place Not The Same (Kǒu, 2026)

With Everyman Band

- Everyman Band (ECM, 1982)
- Without Warning (ECM, 1985)

=== As sideman ===
With Bruford Levin Upper Extremities

- Bruford Levin Upper Extremities (Papa Bear, 1998)
- B.L.U.E. Nights (Papa Bear, 2000)

With David Bowie

- Heathen (Columbia/ISO, 2002)
- Reality (Columbia/ISO, 2003)
- The Next Day (Columbia/ISO, 2013)

With Mark Isham

- Castalia (Virgin, 1988)
- Tibet (Windham Hill, 1989)
- Mark Isham (Virgin, 1990)
- Reversal of Fortune (Milan, 1991)
- Blue Sun (Columbia, 1995)

With Patrick O'Hearn

- Trust (Deep Cave, 1995)
- Metaphor (Deep Cave, 1996)
- So Flows the Current (Patrickohearn.com, 2001)

With Ryuichi Sakamoto

- Discord (Gut for Life, 1997)
- Cinemage (Sony, 1999)
- Moto.tronic (Sony, 2003)

With others

- Tori Amos, Scarlet's Walk (Epic, 2002)
- Laurie Anderson, Life on a String (Nonesuch, 2001)
- David Baerwald, David Baerwald Presents Hurlyburly (Lakeshore, 1999)
- Cheryl Bentyne, Something Cool (Columbia, 1992)
- Tim Berne, Incidentals (ECM, 2017)
- Tim Berne, The Sevens (New World/CounterCurrents, 2002)
- Jack Bruce, Somethin Els (Esoteri, 2014)
- Chocolate Genius, Black Music (V2, 1998)
- Jan Garbarek, It's OK to Listen to the Gray Voice (ECM, 1985)
- Gongzilla, Thrive (Lolo, 1996)
- Happy Rhodes, Building the Colossus (Aural Gratification, 1994)
- Jansen / Barbieri / Karn, Beginning to Melt: Medium Series Volume 1 (Medium, 1993)
- Steve Jansen & Richard Barbieri, Stone to Flesh (Medium, 1995)
- Jarboe, The Men Album (Atavistic, 2005)
- Mick Karn, Bestial Cluster (CMP, 1993)
- Mick Karn, The Tooth Mother (CMP, 1995)
- Manu Katché, Playground, (ECM, 2007)
- Kaki King, Legs to Make Us Longer (Red Ink, 2004)
- k.d. lang, Drag (Warner Bros., 1997)
- John Legend, Once Again (Columbia/Sony, 2006)
- Tony Levin, Waters of Eden (Narada/Virgin, 2000)
- Tony Levin, "Bungie Bass" on Bringing It Down to the Bass (Flatiron, 2024)
- Donna Lewis, Brand New Day (Palmetto, 2015)
- Mark Nauseef, Sura (CMP, 1983)
- Mark Nauseef & Miroslav Tadic, The Snake Music (CMP, 1994)
- Meshell Ndegeocello, Bitter (Maverick, 1999)
- The Pineapple Thief, Dissolution (Kscope, 2018)
- Robert Rich, Seven Veils (Hearts of Space, 1998)
- Andy Rinehart, Jason's Chord (CMP, 1993)
- Douglas September, Ten Bulls (Gold Circle, 1998)
- Michael Shrieve, The Leaving Time (Novus/RCA 1988)
- Michael Shrieve, Stiletto (Novus/RCA/BMG 1989)
- David Sylvian, Secrets of the Beehive (Virgin, 1987), with prev. unreleased track on compilation Everything and Nothing (Virgin, 2000)
- Michael Whalen, Mysterious Ways (Koch, 2001)
- David Wilcox, Blaze (What Are? 2014)
- Sonar, Three Movements (7d Media, 2023)

=== Film and television ===
As musician

- A Dangerous Woman (1998)
- A Knight's Tale (2001)
- Adaptation (2002)
- Admission (2013)
- Airheads (1994)
- Blood Omen 2 (2002)
- Fear (1996)
- Fur (2006)
- Heist (2001)
- Howl (2010)
- Kalifornia (1993)
- March of the Penguins (2005)
- No Country for Old Men (2007)
- Rosewater (2015)
- S1M0NE (2003)
- Smoke Signals (1998)
- Snake Eyes (1998)
- Storyville (1992)
- The Big Lebowski (1998)
- The Craft (film) (1996)
- The Departed (2006)
- The Fifth Estate (film) (2013)
- The Lincoln Lawyer (2011)
- The Order (2003)
- The Twilight Saga: Breaking Dawn (2012)
- Three Kings (1999)
- Traffic (2000)
- Twilight (2008)
- Velvet Goldmine (1998)
- Wonderstruck (2017)

As composer

- Anvil! The Story of Anvil (2007), additional music
- Believe in Me (2006)
- Drumline: A New Beat (2014)
- Everything Must Go (2011)
- Friday Night Lights (2004)
- Glee – The Power of Madonna (2010), "What It Feels Like for a Girl", uncredited
- Jesus Henry Christ (2011)
- Lars and the Real Girl (2007)
- Love Monkey (2006)
- Saint John of Las Vegas (2009)
- StarCraft II: Heart of the Swarm (2013)
- Teenage Paparazzo (2010)
- That Awkward Moment (2014)
- The Beatles: Eight Days a Week (2016)
- The Wackness (2008)
