= Iselin Steiro =

Norwegian model

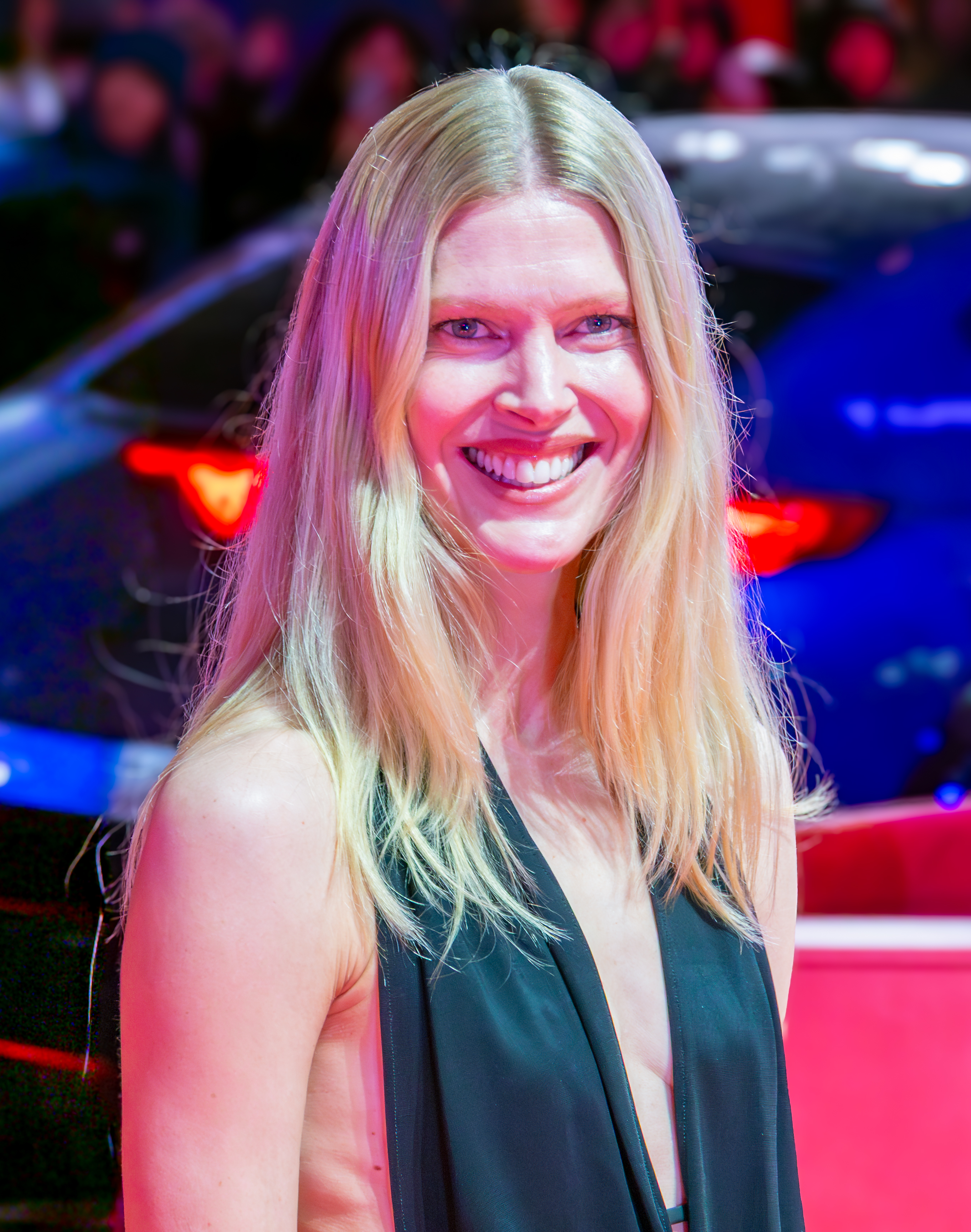
- Steiro in 2026
- Born: Iselin Vollen Steiro; 15 September 1985 (age 41); Harstad, Norway
- Spouse: Anders Danielsen Lie (m. 2008)
- Children: 2
- Modeling information
- Height: 178 cm (5 ft 10 in)
- Hair color: Blonde
- Eye color: Green
- Agency: Women Management (New York, Paris, Milan); UNIQUE DENMARK (Copenhagen); Team Models (Oslo)

Iselin Vollen Steiro (born 15 September 1985) is a Norwegian model.

== Career ==
Steiro grew up in Harstad in the northern part of Norway, and began her fashion career in 2003 by working for Prada and Calvin Klein in her first season.

In 2004, she moved to New York City to pursue her modeling career. In 2007, she moved back to Norway and enrolled at the Oslo School of Architecture and Design, majoring in architecture while continuing to model in various capacities.

During the spring 2010 Fashion Week, Iselin made a return to the runway, modelling in 20 fashion shows. In New York, Iselin modelled for companies including Michael Kors, Alexander Wang, and Tommy Hilfiger. After skipping the London Fashion Week, and modelling exclusively for Prada in Milan, Iselin went on to model for designers such as Balenciaga, Valentino, Stella McCartney, and Celine.

She has appeared in editorials for magazines including Vogue, W, and T.

She has been featured in campaigns for brands including Prada, Chanel, Versace, Tommy Hilfiger, and Louis Vuitton.

In 2013, she portrayed the young David Bowie in his music video "The Stars (Are Out Tonight)".

As of 2018, she works as a co-designer for the undergarment line Le Backhand.

== Personal life ==
In 2007, Steiro met Anders Danielsen Lie, a Norwegian physician and actor, and they married on 5 July 2008. They have two daughters together.
