= Cloud About Mercury =

Studio album by David Torn
- Released: 1987
- Recorded: March 1986
- Studio: Audio International, London
- Genre: Jazz
- Length: 45:16
- Label: ECM
- Producer: Manfred Eicher

David Torn chronology
Best Laid Plans (1984)	Cloud About Mercury (1987)	Door X (1990)

Cloud About Mercury is the second album by guitarist David Torn, supported by trumpeter Mark Isham, bassist Tony Levin and drummer Bill Bruford. It was recorded in March 1986 and released on the ECM label in 1987.

Levin and Bruford had recently played together in King Crimson. Fretless bassist Mick Karn (of Japan) had initially been selected as the bass player for the project, but had to be replaced at the last minute by Levin after falling ill. Karn replaced Levin for Torn's subsequent tour dates.

== Reception ==
The Allmusic review by Glenn Astarita awarded the album 5 stars stating "Simply put, Cloud About Mercury looms as one of the finest jazz fusion dates of the '80s, and should be deemed a mandatory purchase for aficionados of this genre".

Professional ratings
Review scores
Source	Rating
Allmusic	5/5 stars

== Track listing ==
All compositions by David Torn except as indicated

1. "Suyafhu Skin... Snapping the Hollow Reed" - 8:21
2. "The Mercury Grid" - 6:33
3. "3 Minutes of Pure Entertainment" - 7:10
4. "Previous Man" (Bill Bruford, Mark Isham, Tony Levin, David Torn) - 7:55
5. "Networks of Sparks: a) The Delicate Code" - 4:52
6. "Networks of Sparks: b) Egg Learns to Walk... Suyafhu Seal" (Bruford, Isham, Levin, Torn/Torn) - 10:25

== Personnel ==
- David Torn - electric guitar, acoustic guitar
- Mark Isham - trumpet, piccolo trumpet, flugelhorn, synthesizer
- Tony Levin - Chapman stick, synthesizer bass
- Bill Bruford - Simmons drums, synthesizer-drums, percussion
