= List of songs recorded by David Bowie =

Songs by English musician

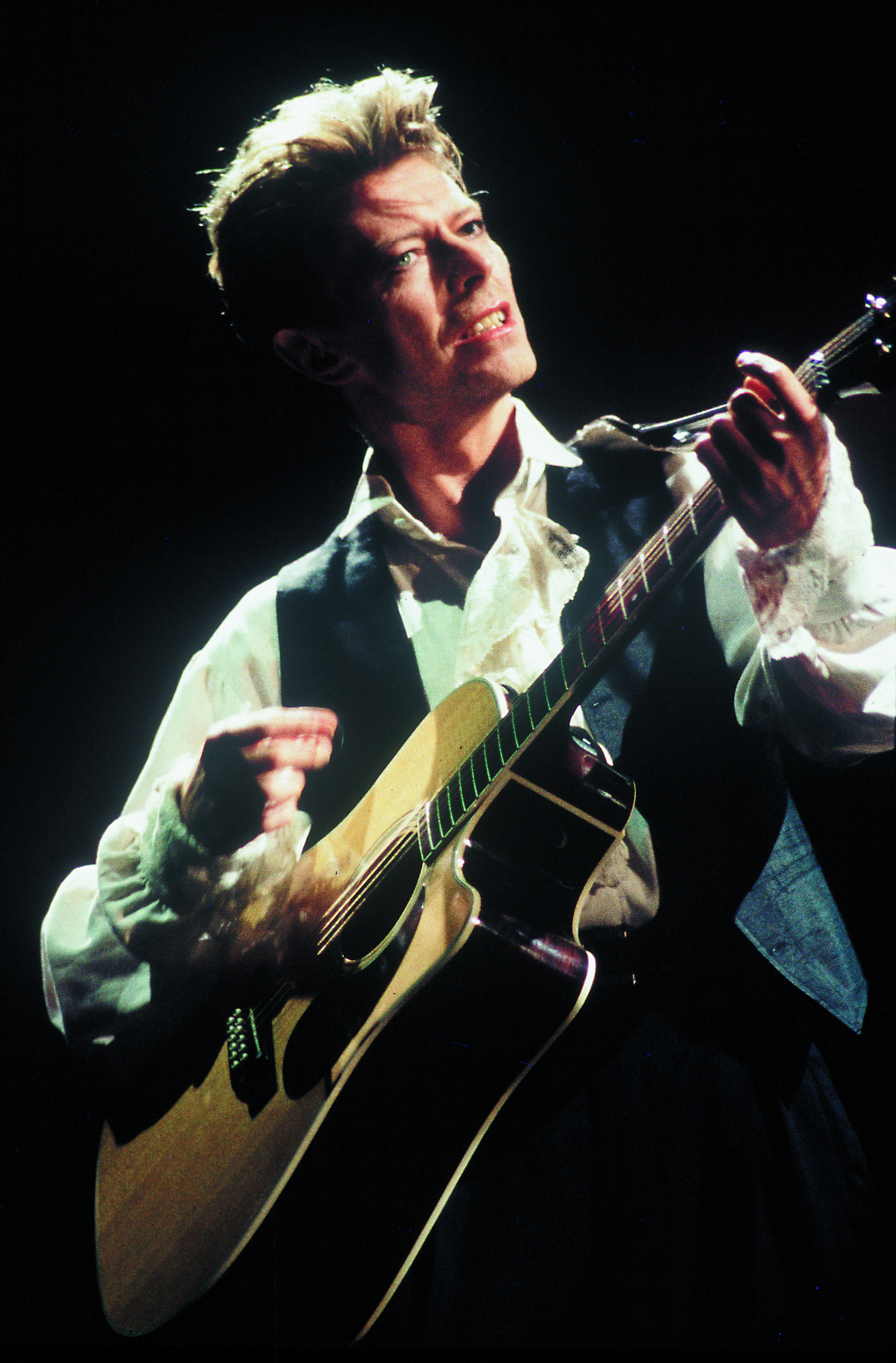
David Bowie performing on the Sound+Vision Tour in 1990

David Bowie (1947–2016) was an English musician who recorded over 400 different songs in a career which spanned six decades. (Note: Bowie often re-recorded previously released songs of his such as "John, I'm Only Dancing" vs. "John, I'm Only Dancing (Again)" and "Sue (Or in a Season of Crime)" on Nothing Has Changed and Blackstar. Many of his songs are also available in different edits, such as single vs. album versions.) Bowie worked with numerous artists throughout his career, including producers Tony Visconti, Brian Eno and singer Iggy Pop, and was the primary songwriter for most of his songs; he recorded cover versions of songs by artists including the Who, the Pretty Things and the Yardbirds. Beginning his career under the name Davy Jones, Bowie released singles with multiple backing bands, including the King Bees and the Lower Third, all of which went generally unnoticed. Following his baroque pop and music hall influenced self-titled debut album in 1967, he released his first successful single "Space Oddity", which introduced the fictional astronaut Major Tom. (Note: Introduced in "Space Oddity" (1969), Major Tom would again be referenced by Bowie in his songs "Ashes to Ashes" (1980), "Hallo Spaceboy" (Pet Shop Boys remix) (1996), and "Blackstar" (2014).) He then released his folk rock inspired second self-titled album in 1969, (Note: Reissued in 1972 by RCA Records as Space Oddity, which remained its official title for almost forty years.) the hard rock The Man Who Sold the World (1970), and the art pop Hunky Dory (1971), which represented an artistic breakthrough for Bowie, containing songs such as "Changes" and "Life on Mars?".

Between 1972 and 1974, Bowie was a pioneer of the glam rock genre, as showcased on The Rise and Fall of Ziggy Stardust and the Spiders from Mars (1972), which launched Bowie to stardom, Aladdin Sane and the covers album Pin Ups (both 1973), and Diamond Dogs (1974). His songs from this era include "Suffragette City", "The Jean Genie", "Rebel Rebel" and "All the Young Dudes" (made famous by Mott the Hoople), the last two of which are regarded as glam anthems. Young Americans (1975) showcased Bowie's interest in soul and R&B music, as well as funk ("Fame"). Station to Station (1976) was the vehicle for his persona the Thin White Duke, and is commonly known as the musical transition between Young Americans and his experimental art rock Berlin Trilogy, consisting of Low (1977), "Heroes" (1977) and Lodger (1979). Working with Eno and Visconti, Low featured songs influenced by electronic and ambient music, "Heroes" expanding upon Low with a more art pop sound (prominently on its well-known title track), and Lodger marking the partial return to his previous drum and guitar-based rock sound, with elements of new wave and world music present. Scary Monsters (and Super Creeps) (1980) was a culmination of his 1970s works and featured the singles "Ashes to Ashes" and "Fashion". Bowie then recorded "Under Pressure" with Queen and the title track for the 1982 film Cat People with Giorgio Moroder.

Bowie reached his commercial peak with the post-disco and dance-oriented Let's Dance in 1983. Tonight followed a year later, after which Bowie contributed to various film soundtracks and released the pop rock Never Let Me Down (1987). In 1988, Bowie briefly halted his solo career to record with the band Tin Machine, who explored alternative and grunge styles before the genres were particularly well-known; the band dissolved in 1992 and Bowie resumed his solo career. Black Tie White Noise (1993) marked a creative resurgence for Bowie, featuring songs influenced by soul and jazz music, and made prominent use of electronic instruments. After releasing the experimental The Buddha of Suburbia later the same year, Bowie experimented with industrial rock on Outside (1995), drum and bass and jungle on Earthling (1997), and ended the 1990s with the pop rock-oriented Hours (1999). Bowie reunited with Visconti for the rest of his career, releasing the rock albums Heathen (2002) and Reality (2003) before taking a break from music. His final releases were the art rock-oriented The Next Day in 2013, the song "Sue (Or in a Season of Crime)" in 2014, (Note: "Sue (Or in a Season of Crime)", along with "'Tis a Pity She Was a Whore", were re-recorded for Blackstar.) and his final album Blackstar in 2016, before his death of liver cancer two days after its release. The art rock and jazz album was Bowie's intended swan song, featuring several lyrics that revolved around his impending death. Three new songs from the Blackstar sessions were released on the EP No Plan in 2017. Bowie's unreleased album Toy, recorded in 2000, was posthumously released in 2021.

== Solo songs ==
Key
‡	Indicates songs not written or co-written by David Bowie

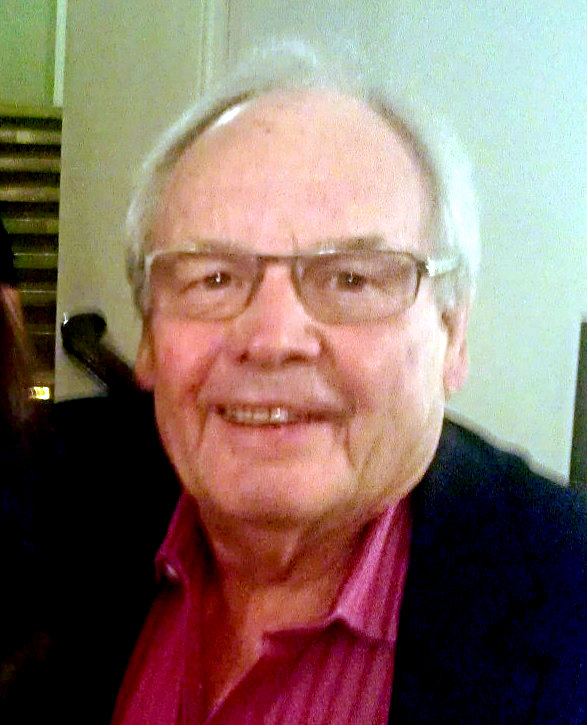
Tony Hatch (pictured in 2013) produced Bowie's three singles for Pye Records from 1965 to 1966.

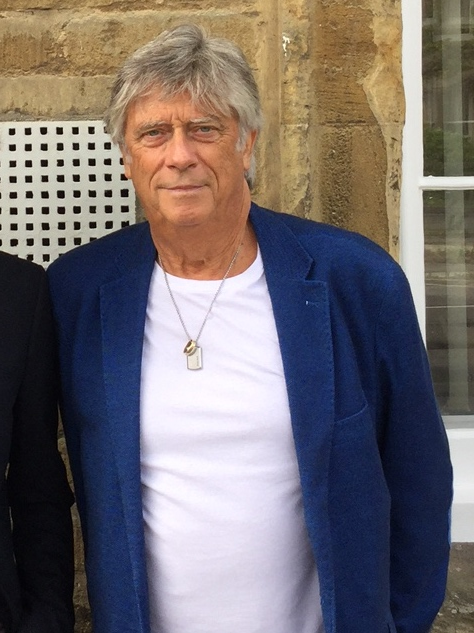
Mike Vernon (pictured in 2017) produced Bowie's 1967 self-titled debut album.

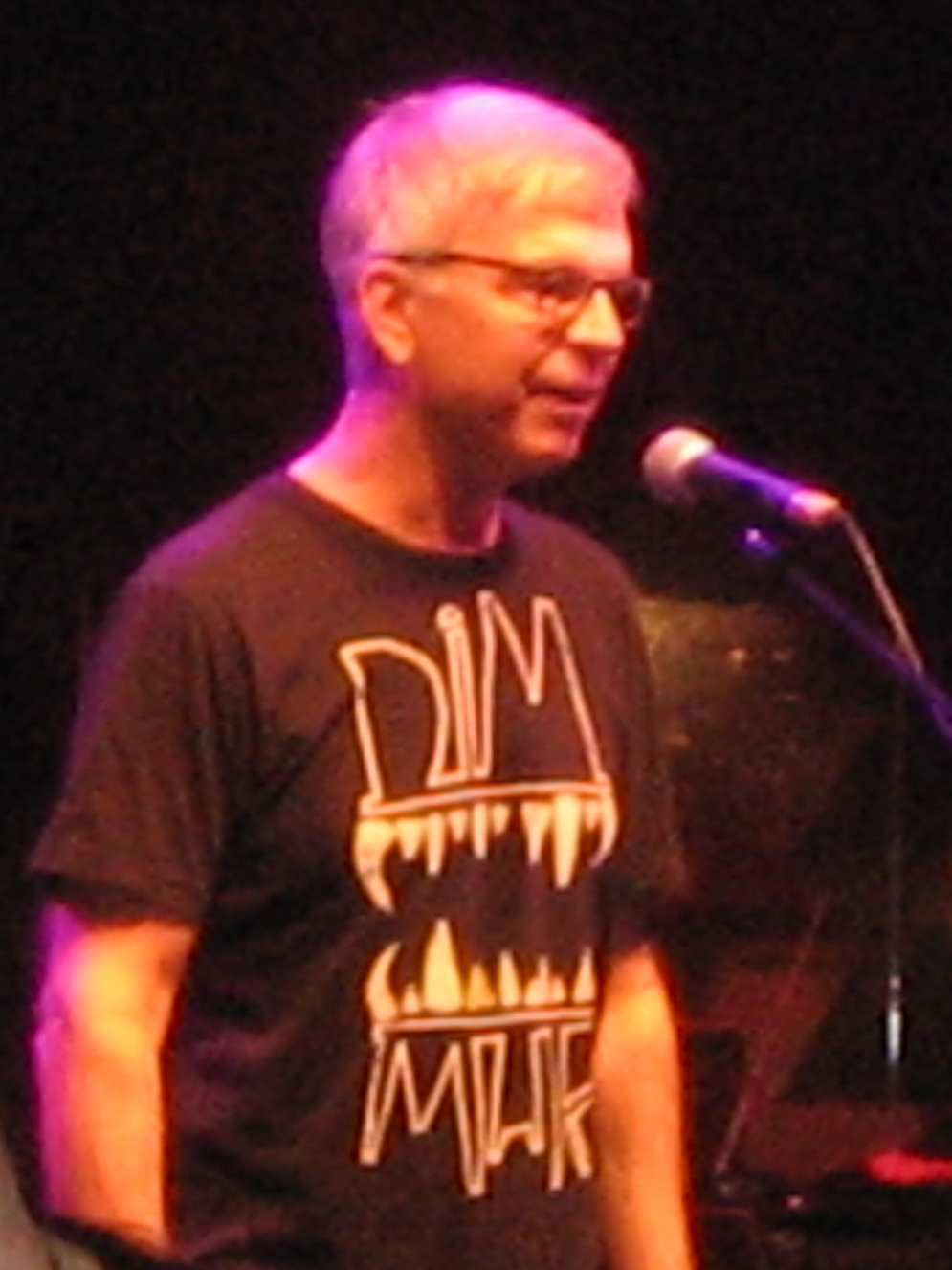
Tony Visconti (pictured in 2007) worked with Bowie for over 40 years, producing 11 of his 27 studio albums. Consequence of Sound later described the collaboration as "one of the most fruitful producer-artist relationships in rock history".

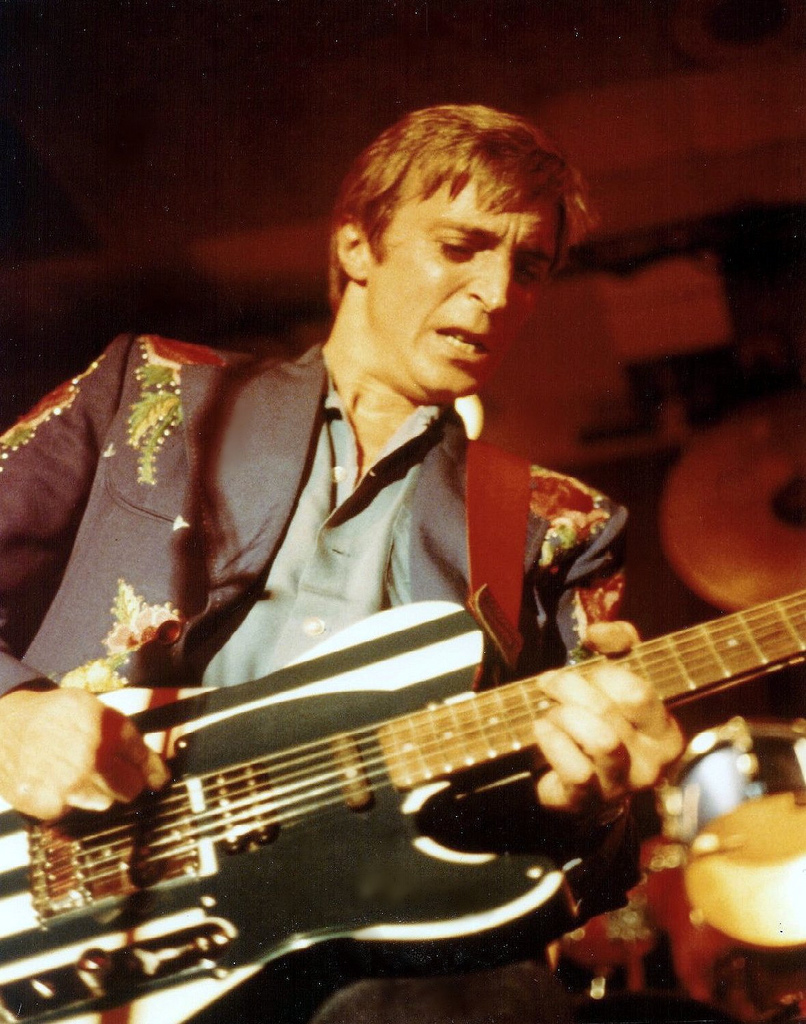
Mick Ronson (pictured in 1981) was Bowie's guitarist between 1970 and 1973. His work with Bowie was highly acclaimed, with Guitar.com considering him Bowie's greatest guitarist. The pair also co-produced Lou Reed's 1972 album Transformer.

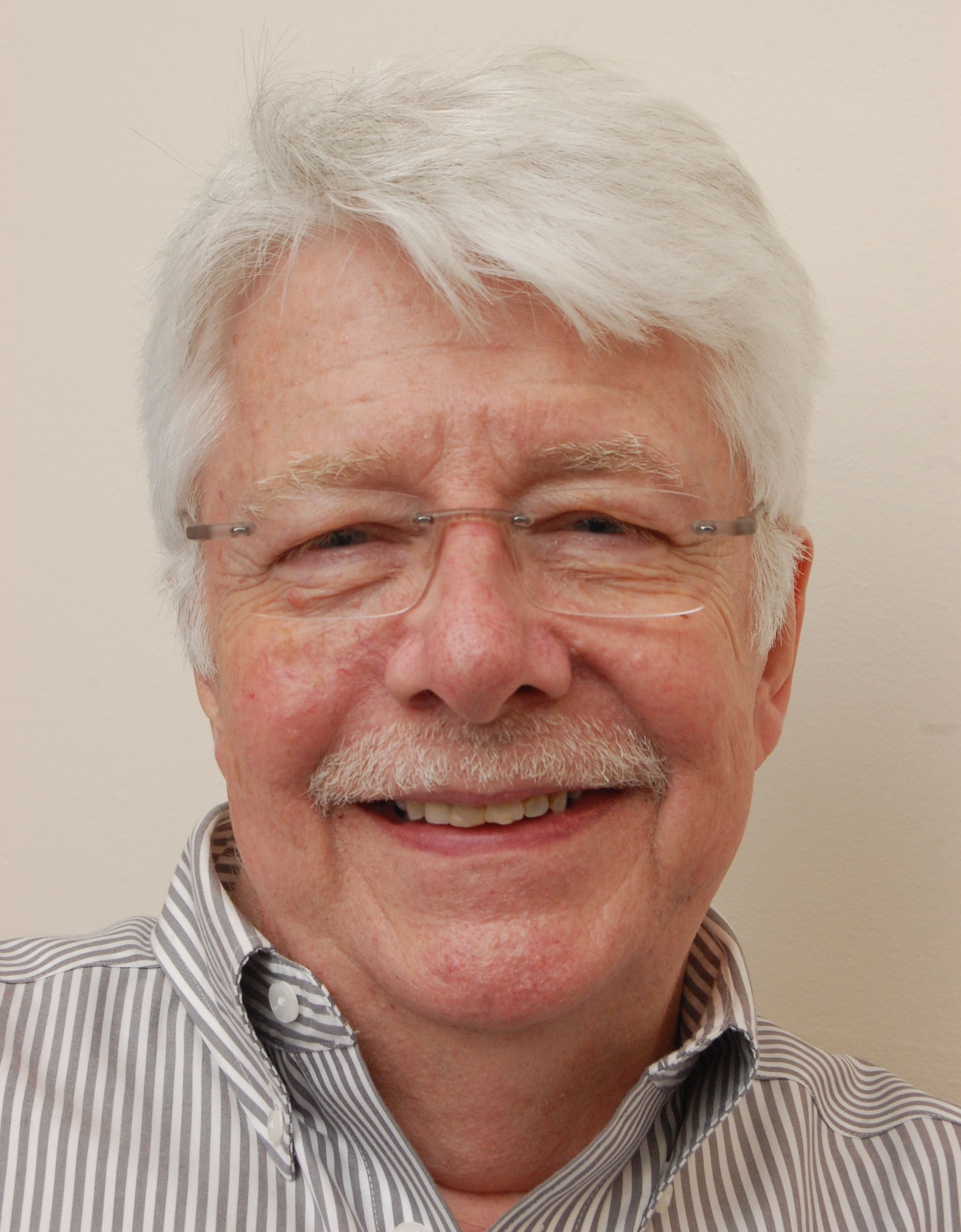
Ken Scott (pictured in 2014) produced Bowie's records between 1971 and 1973.

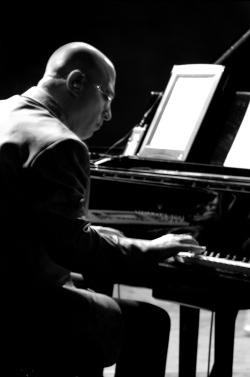
Pianist Mike Garson (pictured in 2008) was Bowie's longest tenured and most frequent band member, performing with him from the 1972–1973 Ziggy Stardust Tour until his final 2003–2004 A Reality Tour.

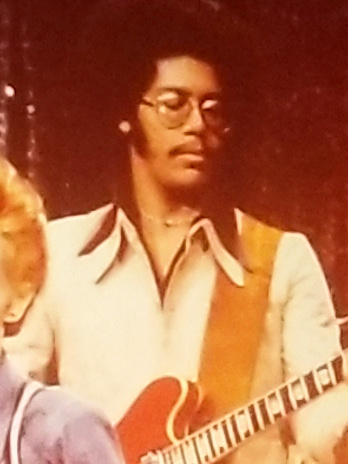
Guitarist Carlos Alomar (pictured in 1974) worked with Bowie for over three decades.

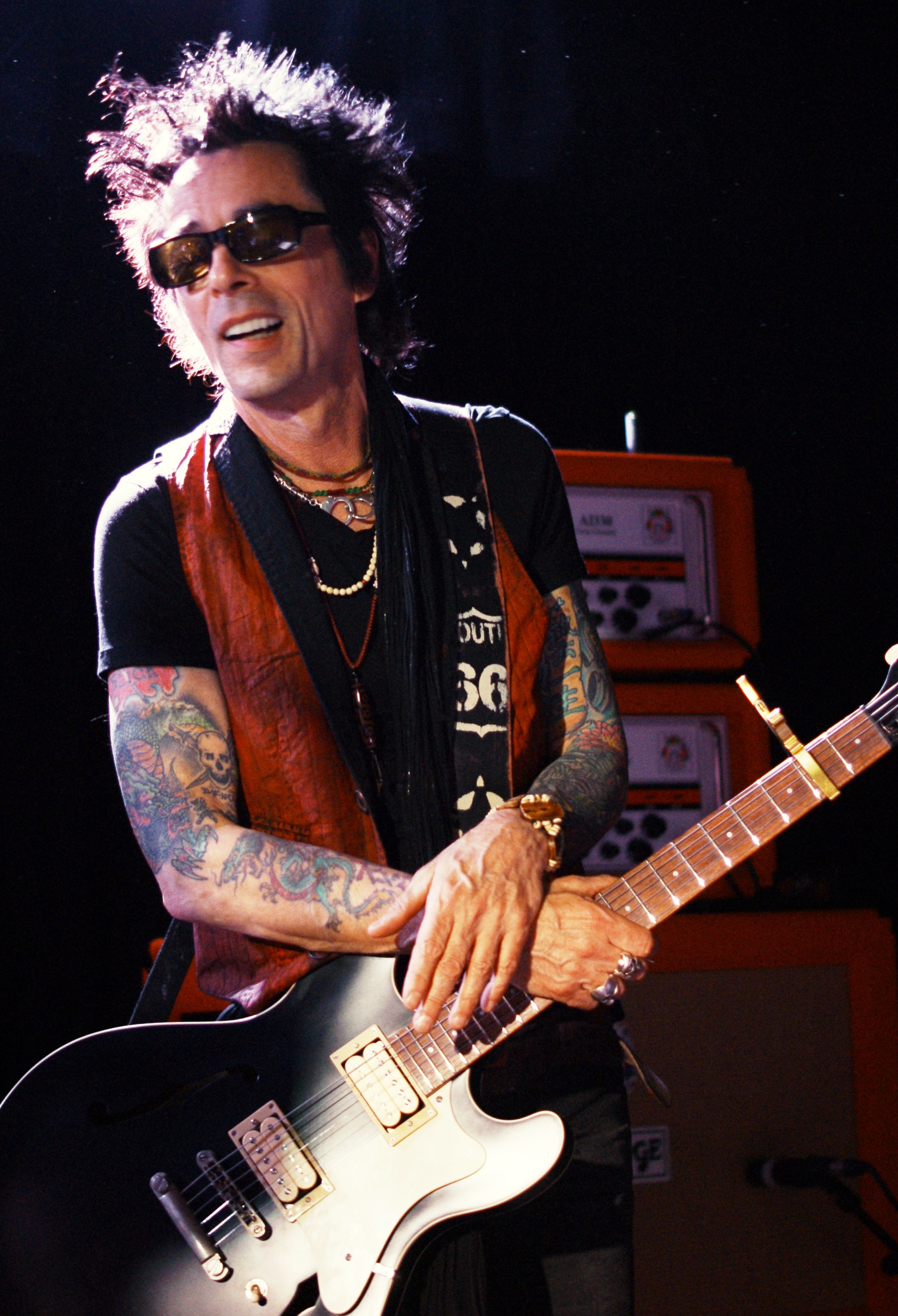
Guitarist Earl Slick (pictured in 2011) worked with Bowie frequently throughout his career, starting with the 1974 Diamond Dogs Tour, up until his 2013 album The Next Day.

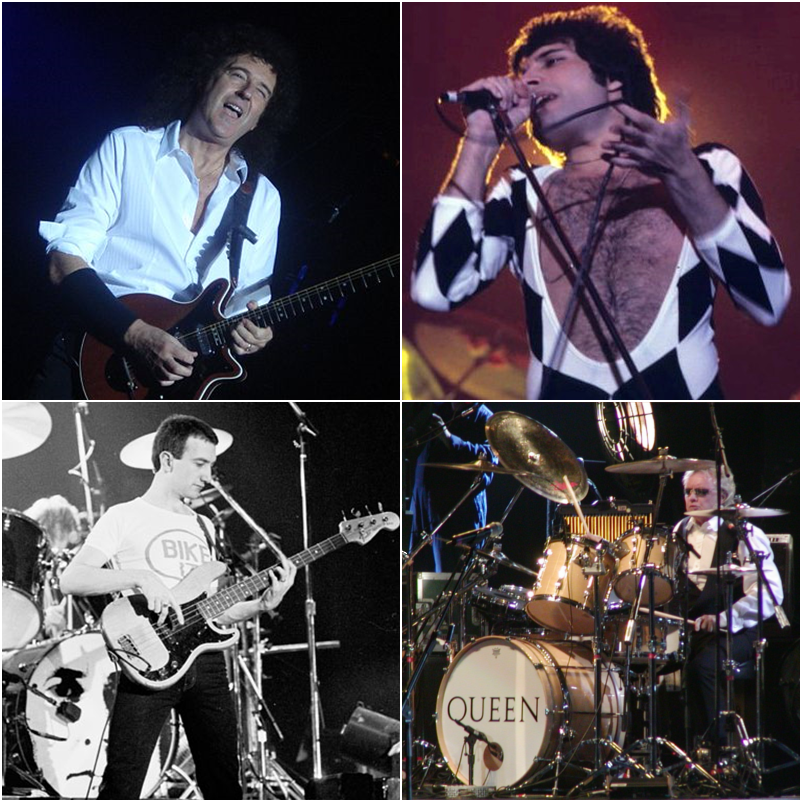
In 1981, Bowie collaborated with the British rock group Queen on the song "Under Pressure", bringing him his third number one hit in the UK and a top 30 hit in the US.

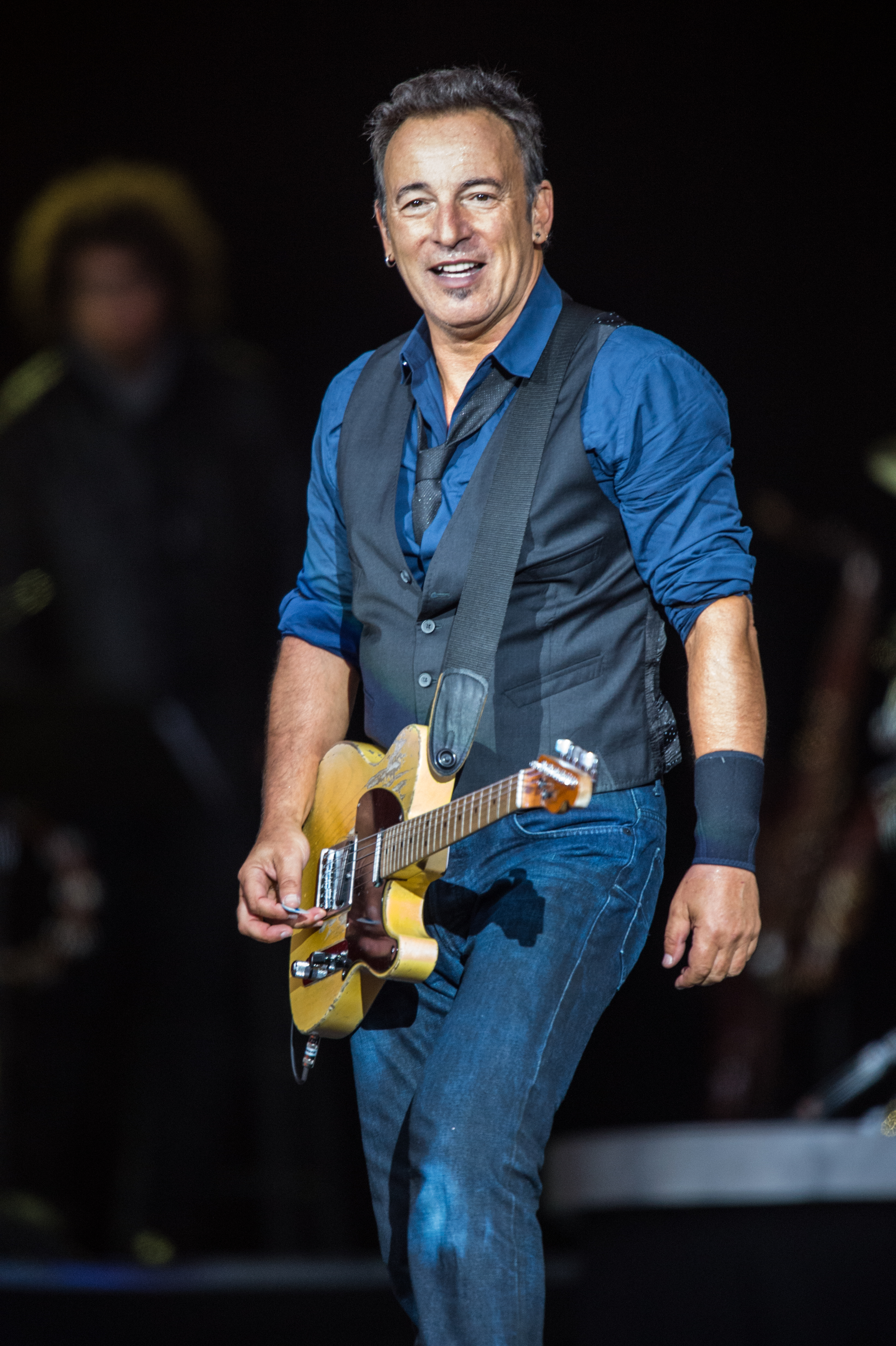
During the 1970s, Bowie covered three songs by singer-songwriter Bruce Springsteen (pictured in 2012): "Growin' Up", "It's Hard to Be a Saint in the City" and "Spirit in the Night" (the last of which for the 1973 Astronettes project). All three would later appear on compilations albums.

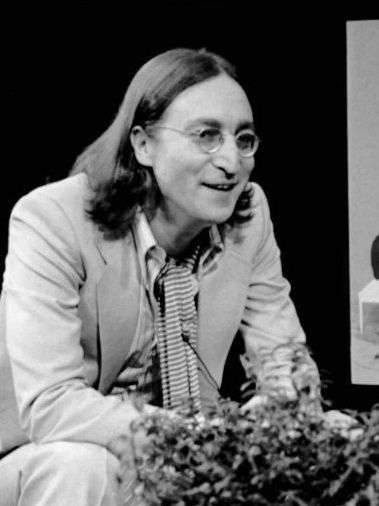
Bowie's 1975 song "Fame" features contributions from former Beatle John Lennon. On top of covering Lennon's songs over his career, Bowie performed a one-off live cover of "Imagine" on the final date of the 1983 Serious Moonlight Tour to mark the third anniversary of Lennon's death. The performance was uploaded to YouTube in 2016.

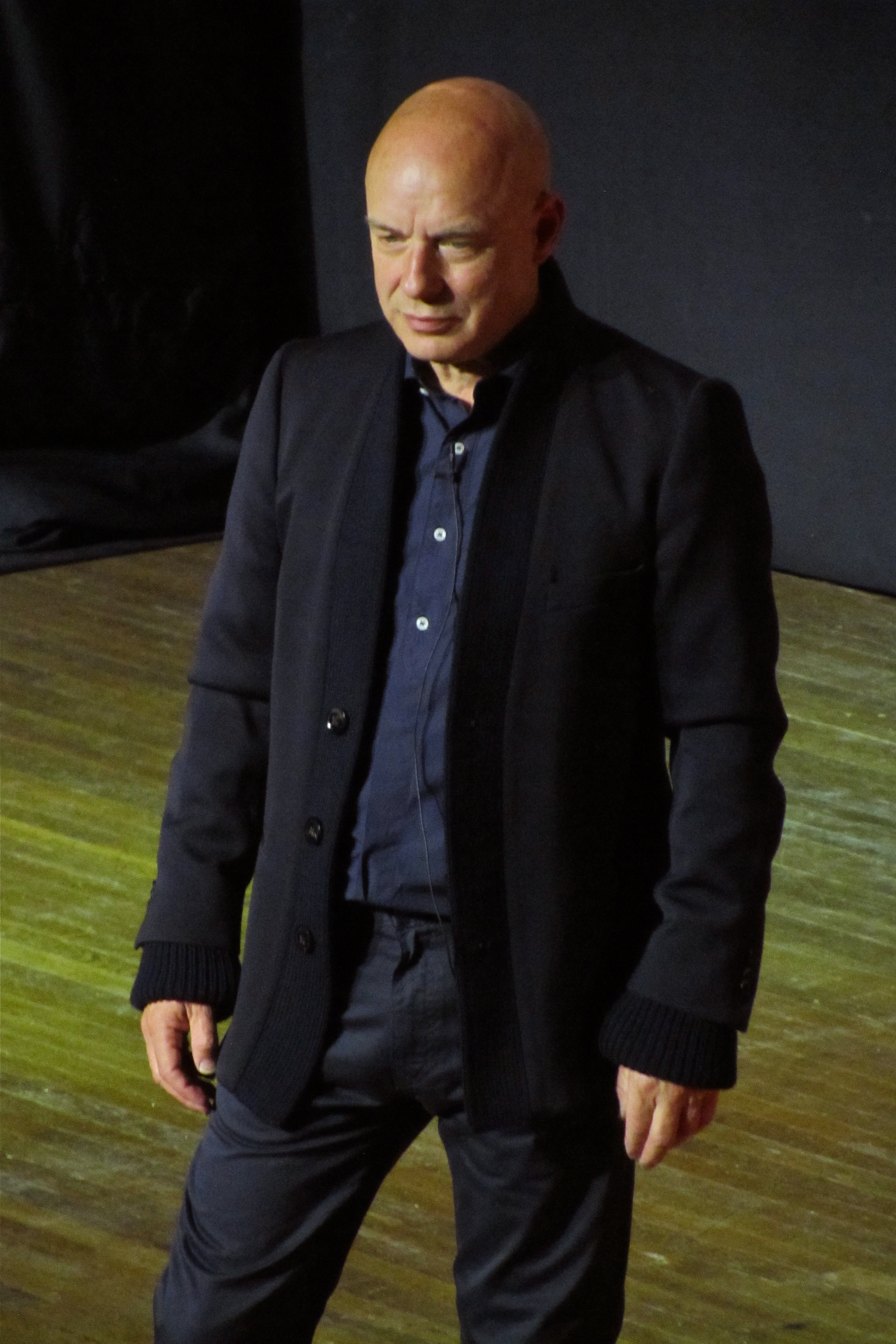
Bowie collaborated with producer Brian Eno (pictured in 2011) numerous times throughout his career, including on his Berlin Trilogy (1977–1979) and Outside (1995).

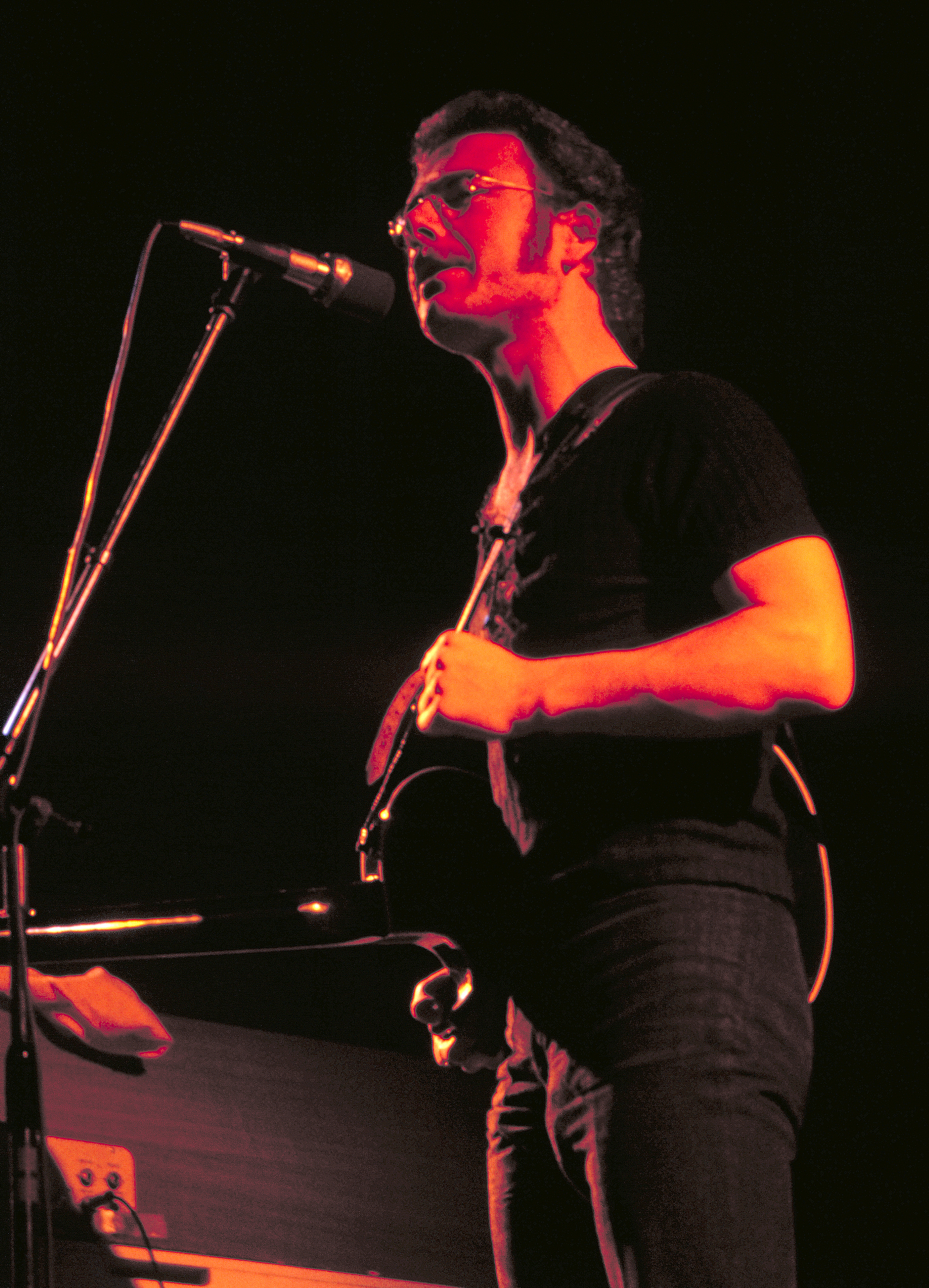
King Crimson guitarist Robert Fripp (pictured in 1973) played lead guitar on "Heroes" (1977) and Scary Monsters (1980).

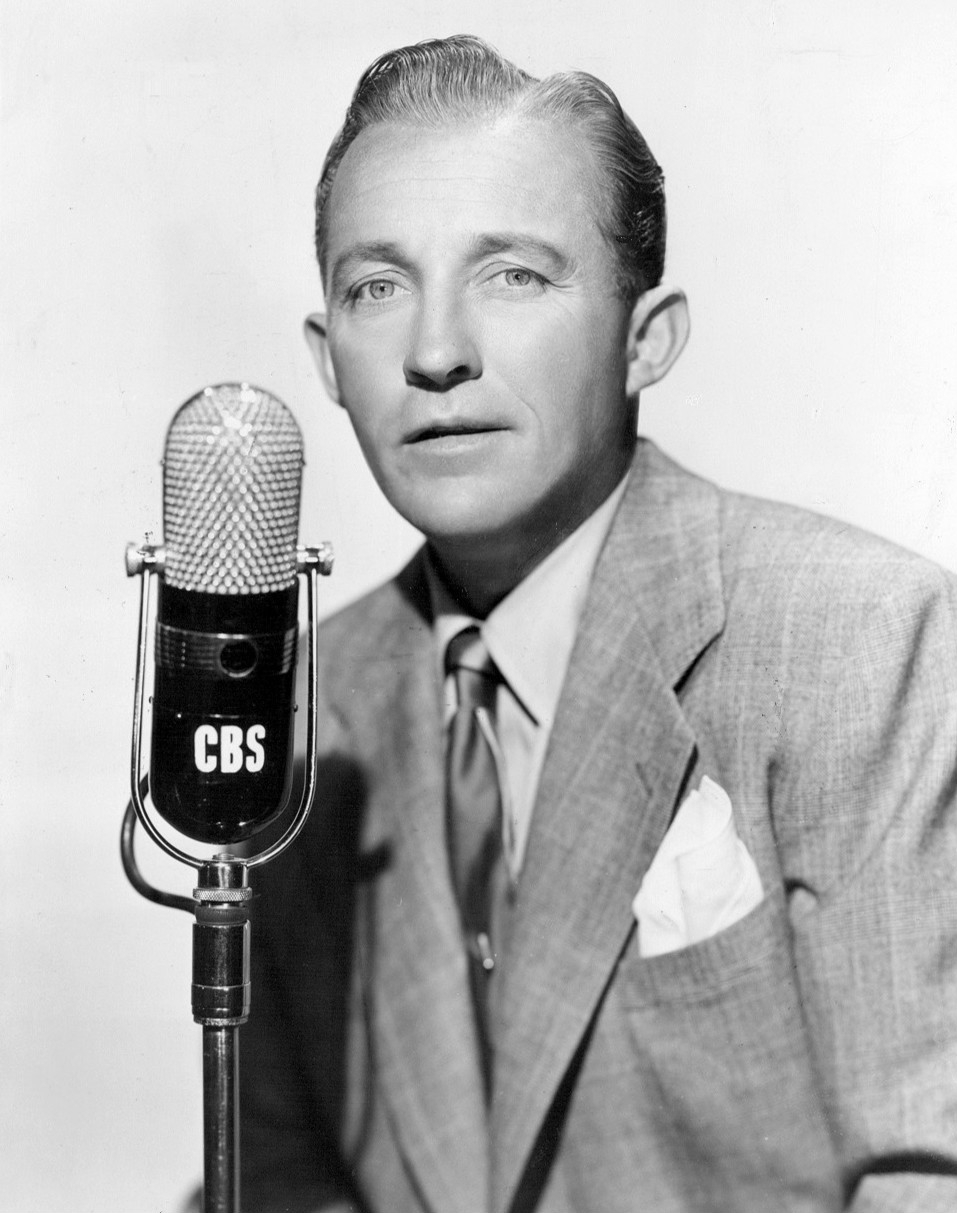
While promoting his 1977 album "Heroes", Bowie sang a duet, the Christmas song "Peace on Earth/Little Drummer Boy", with Bing Crosby (pictured in 1951) for Bing Crosby's Merrie Olde Christmas. RCA Records eventually released the duet as a single in 1982.

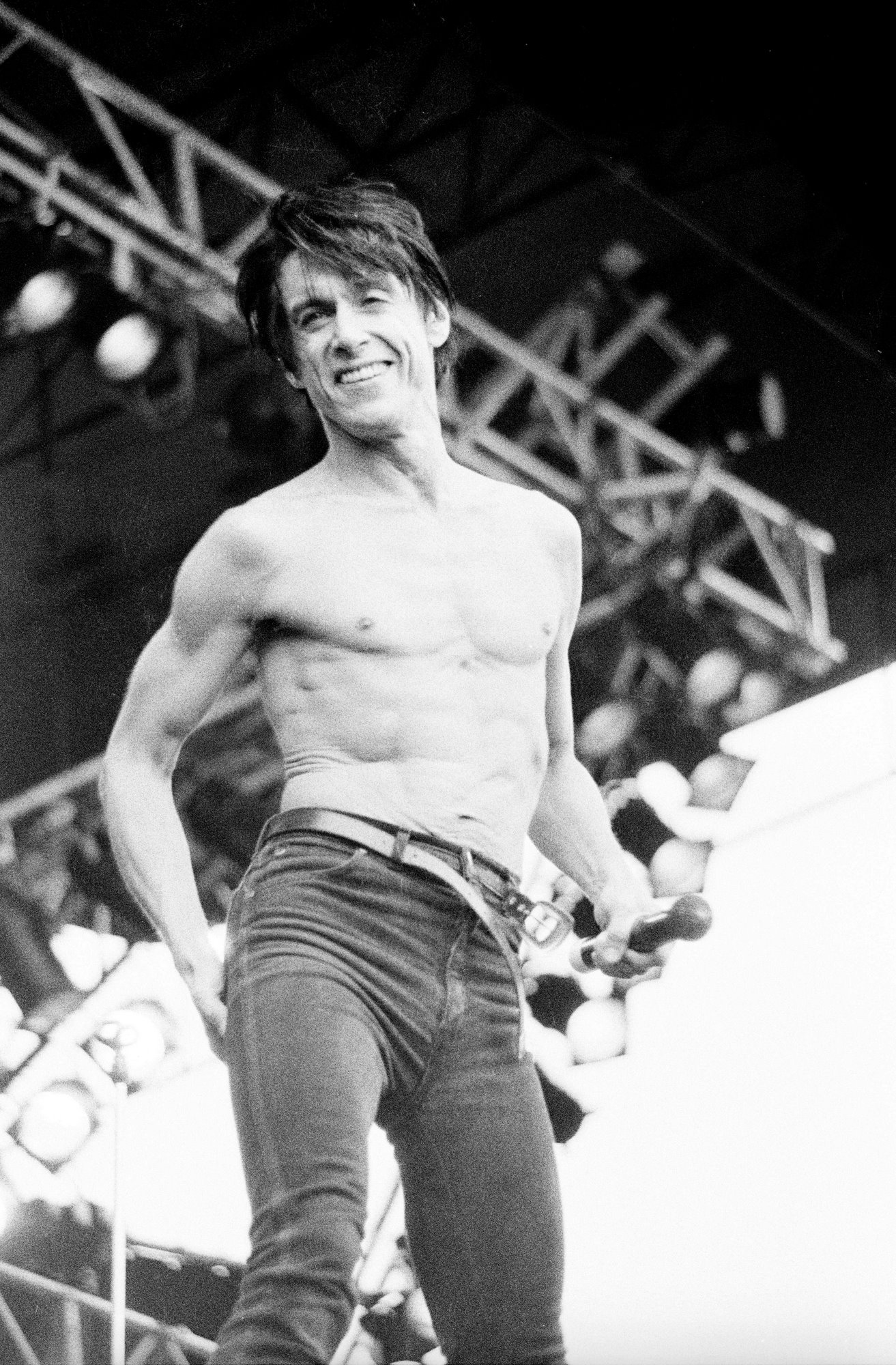
Bowie was good friends with singer Iggy Pop (pictured in 1987) throughout his career. Bowie co-produced and co-wrote Pop's solo albums The Idiot, Lust for Life (both 1977) and Blah-Blah-Blah (1986), while Pop later collaborated with Bowie for 1984's Tonight.

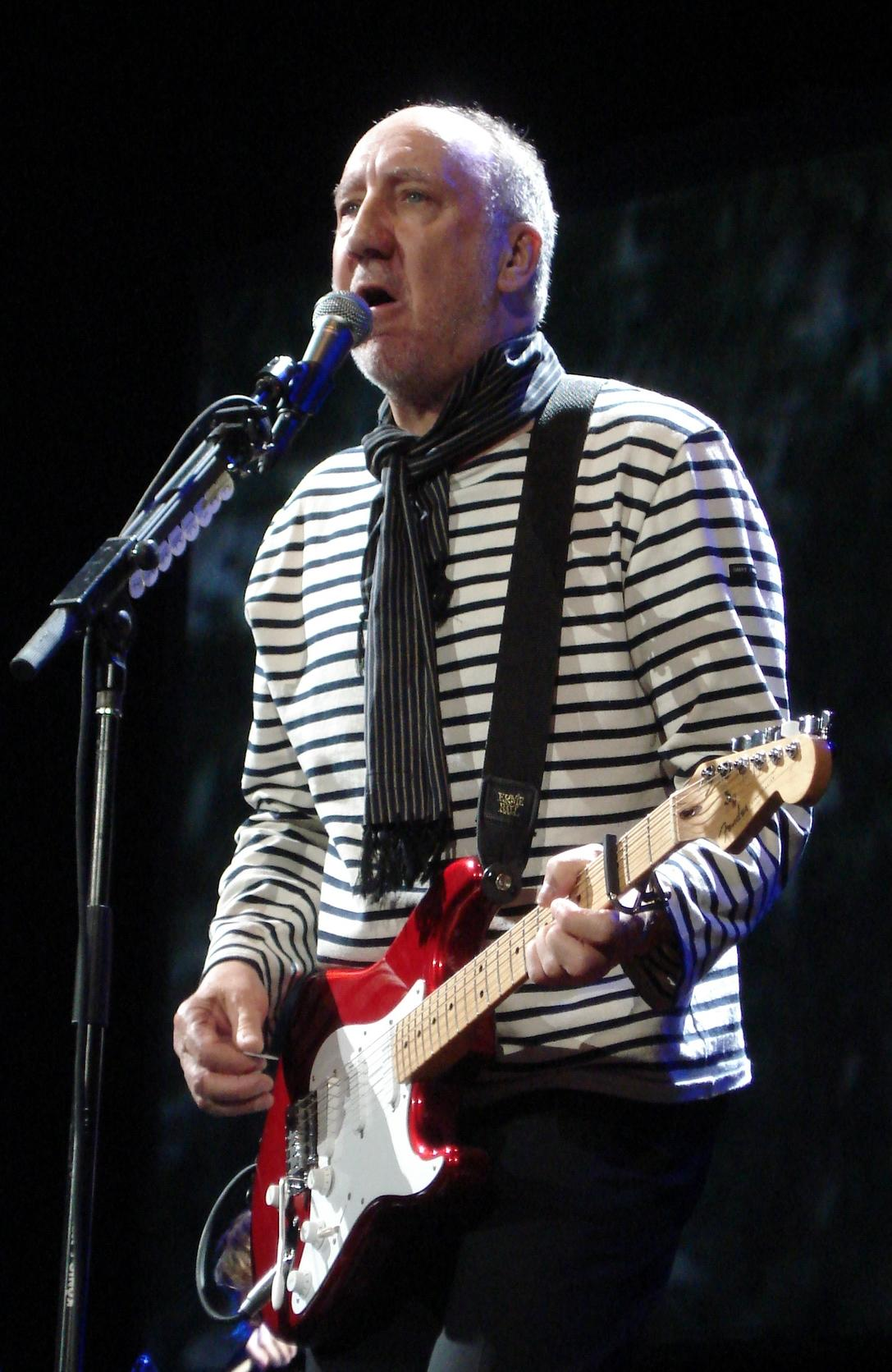
The Who guitarist Pete Townshend (pictured in 2008) contributed a guest appearance on the Scary Monsters track "Because You're Young" (1980) and the Heathen track "Slow Burn" (2002). Bowie had previously covered songs by the Who for his 1973 covers album Pin Ups.

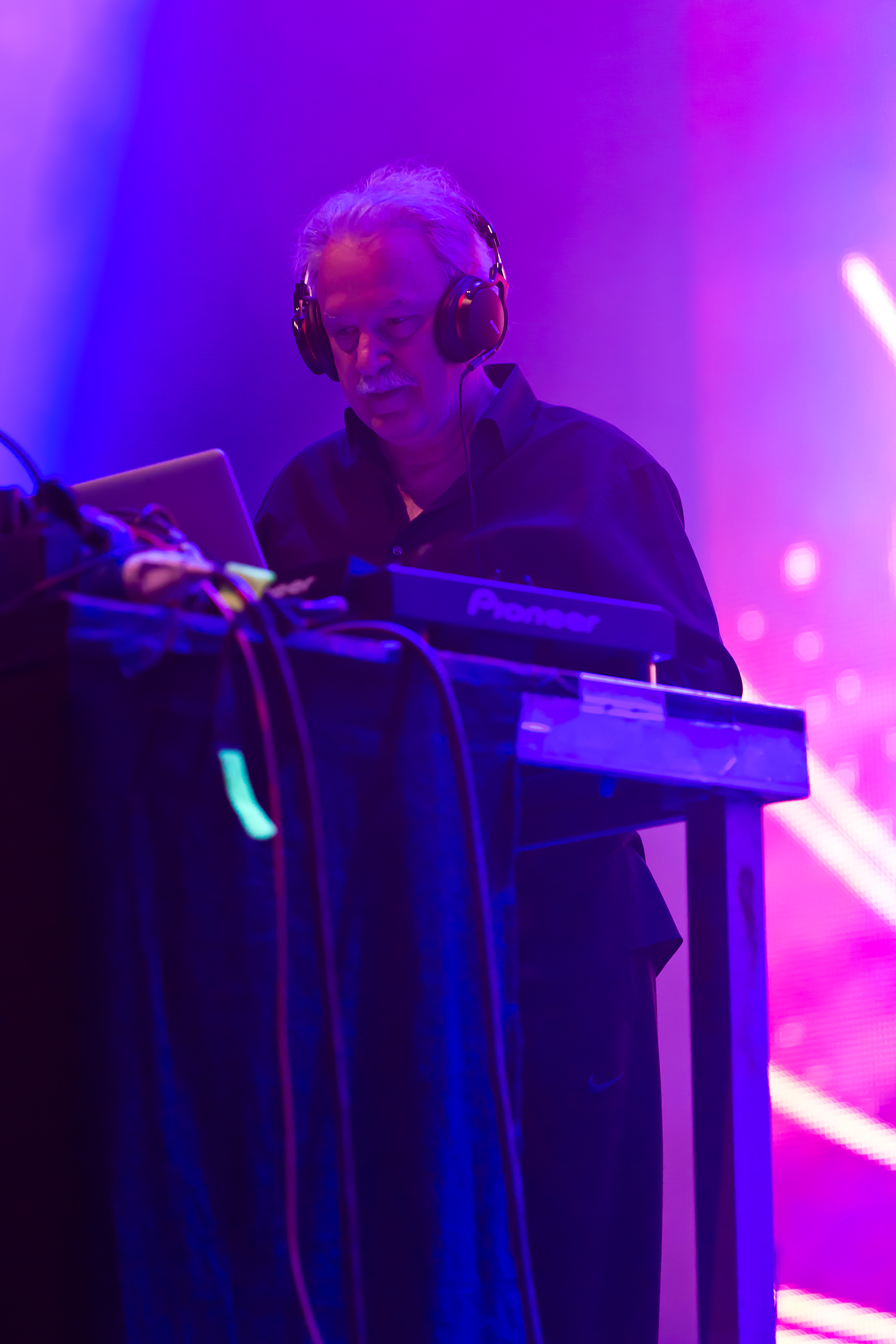
Bowie collaborated with producer Giorgio Moroder (pictured in 2015) for "Cat People (Putting Out Fire)", the title song for the 1982 film Cat People.

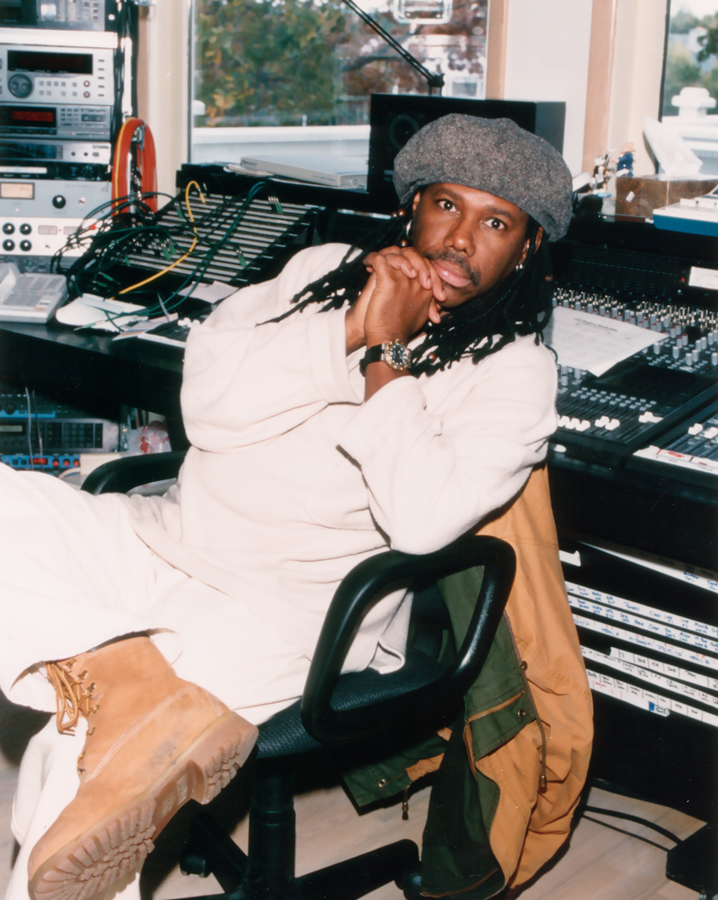
Bowie worked with Chic member Nile Rodgers (pictured in 1999) for 1983's Let's Dance and 1993's Black Tie White Noise.

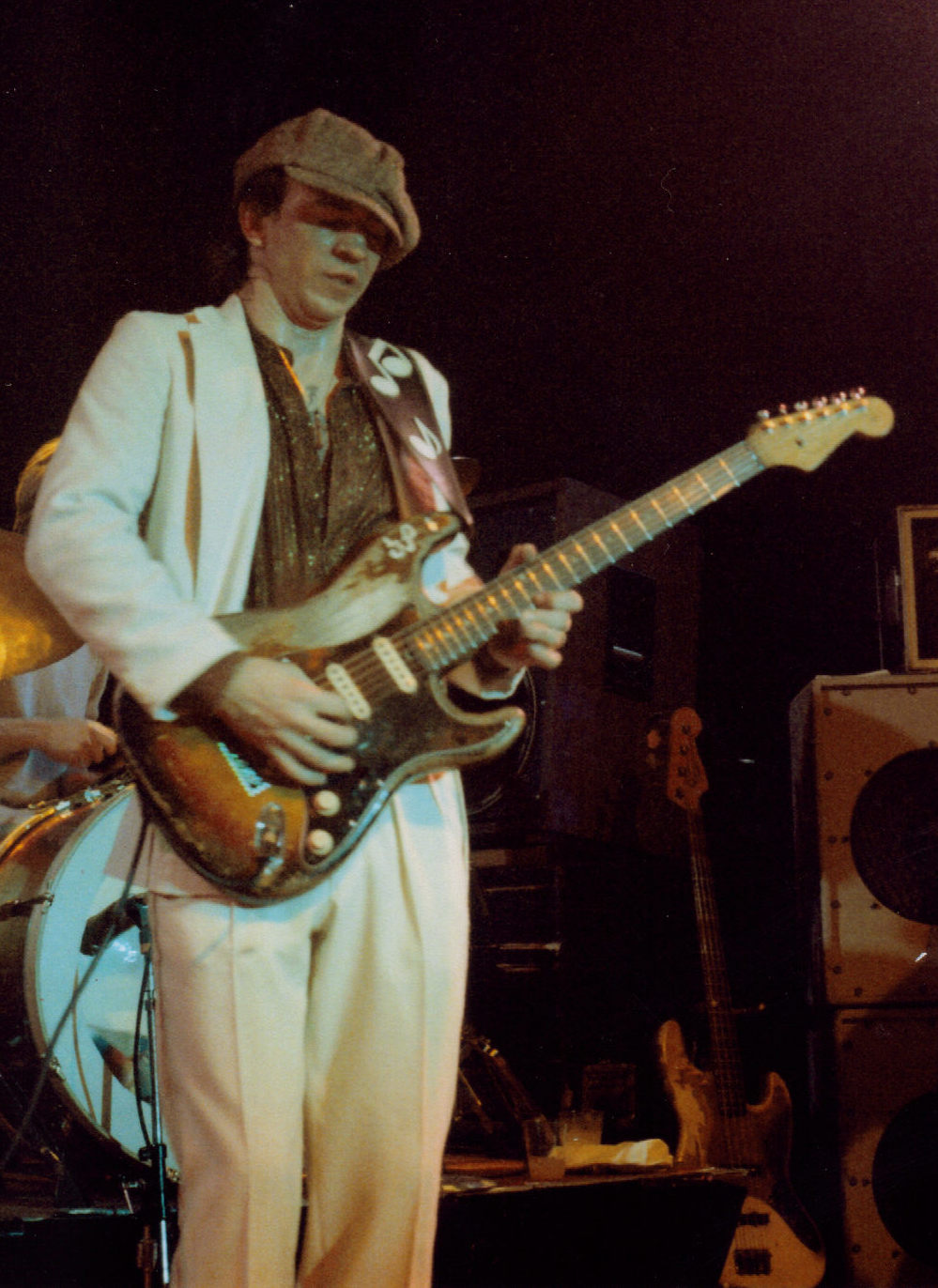
Blues guitarist Stevie Ray Vaughan (pictured in 1983) plays lead guitar on Let's Dance (1983). At the time a then-unknown guitarist, his appearance on Let's Dance was a stepping stone for his own career, which took off shortly after the album's release.

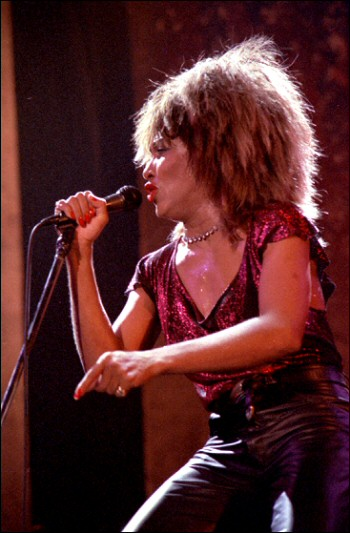
Singer Tina Turner (pictured in 1985) performed guest vocals on the title track of Bowie's 1984 album Tonight. After writing the song "Girls" for her, Bowie recorded his own version during the Never Let Me Down sessions.

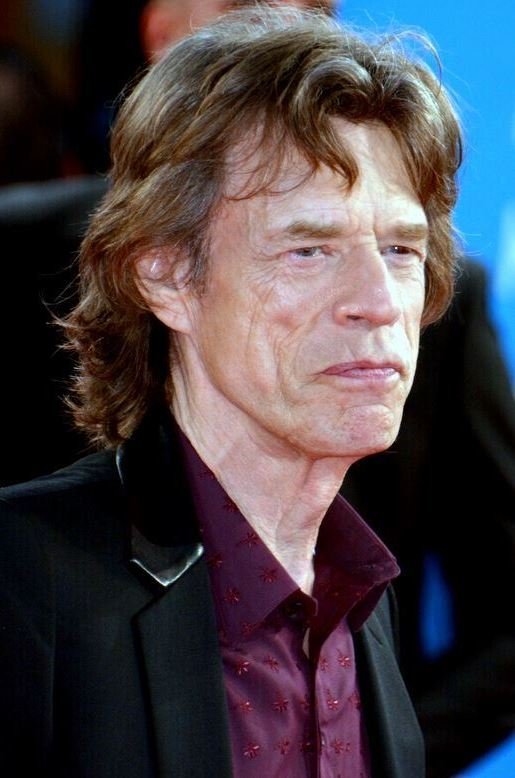
Bowie collaborated with the Rolling Stones frontman Mick Jagger (pictured in 2014) in 1985 for a cover of "Dancing in the Street", originally by Martha and the Vandellas.

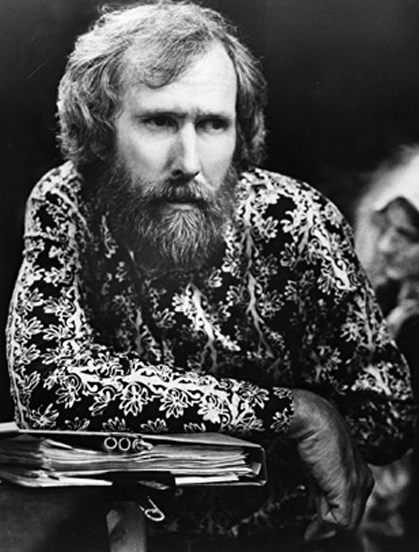
As well as starring in the 1986 film Labyrinth, directed by Jim Henson (pictured in 1986), Bowie composed several songs for the film, all of which appeared on the accompanying soundtrack album.

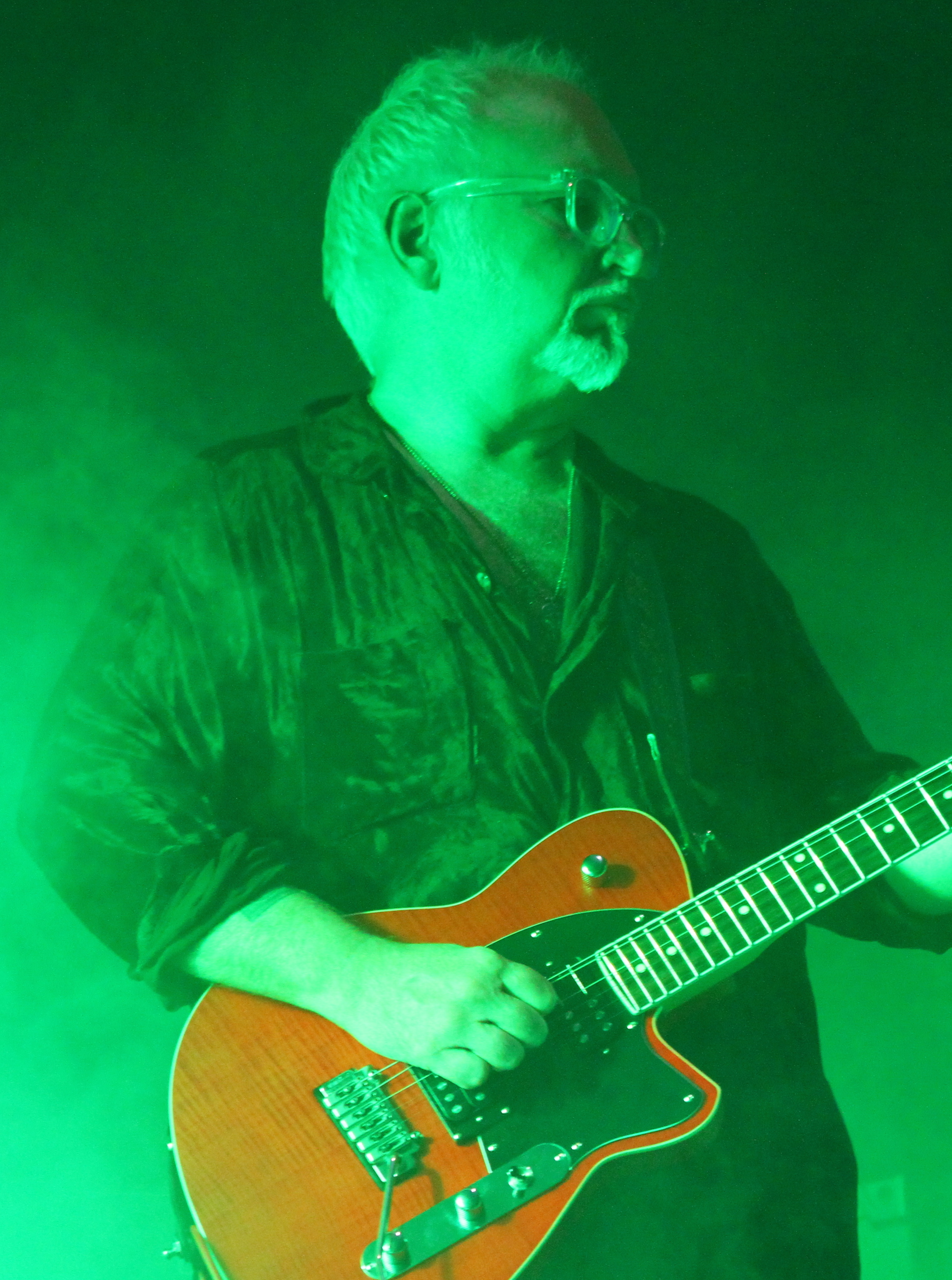
Guitarist Reeves Gabrels (pictured in 2012) was a member of Tin Machine with Bowie from 1988 to 1992 and thereafter worked with Bowie on all his projects until 1999.

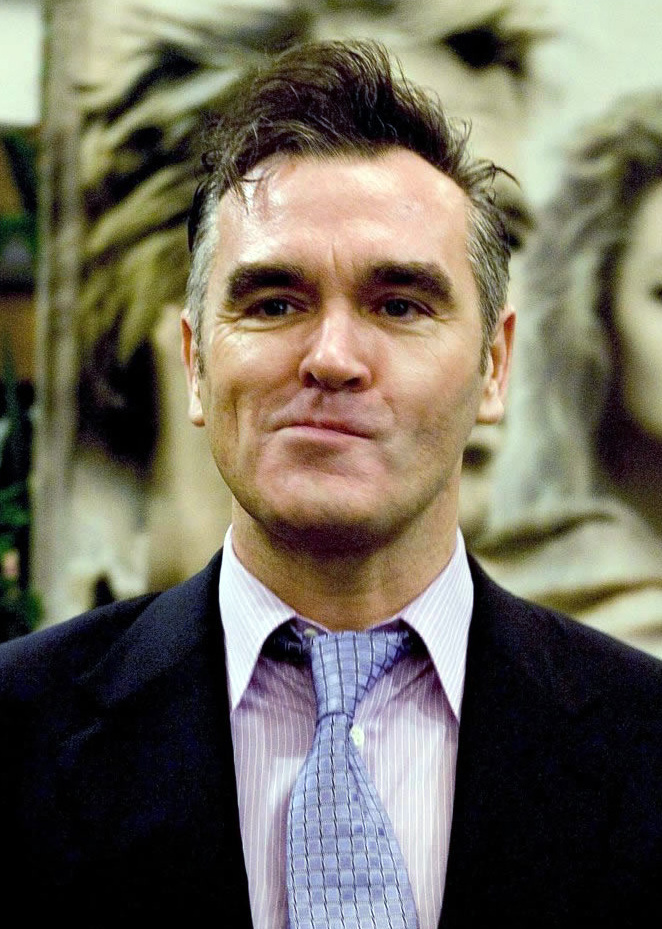
After performing a live one-off version of the T. Rex song "Cosmic Dancer" in 1991 with singer Morrissey (pictured in 2005), Bowie covered his song "I Know It's Gonna Happen Someday" for 1993's Black Tie White Noise.

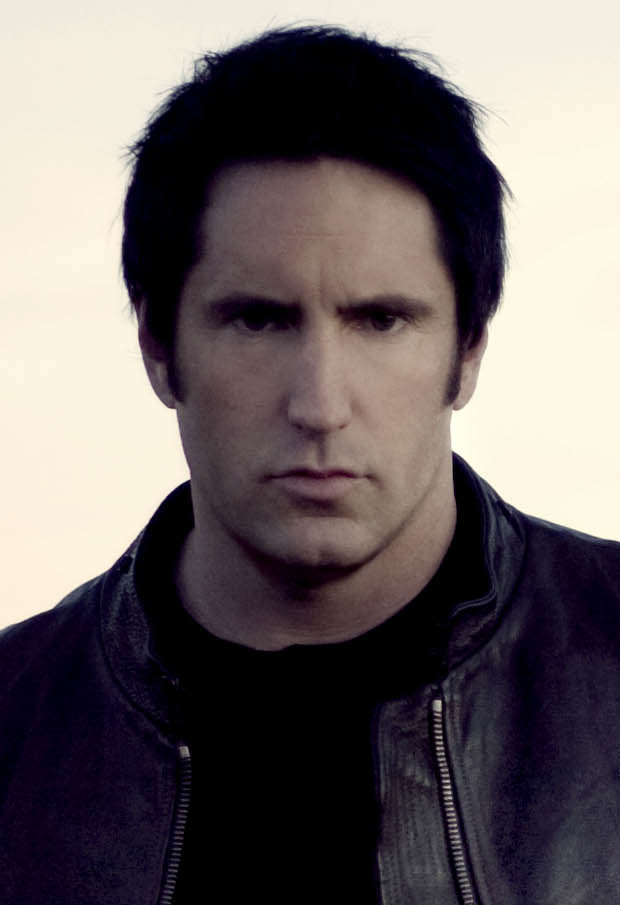
After touring with the industrial rock band Nine Inch Nails in 1995, frontman Trent Reznor (pictured in 2008) created several remixes of "I'm Afraid of Americans" in 1997. Reznor subsequently appeared in the song's music video.

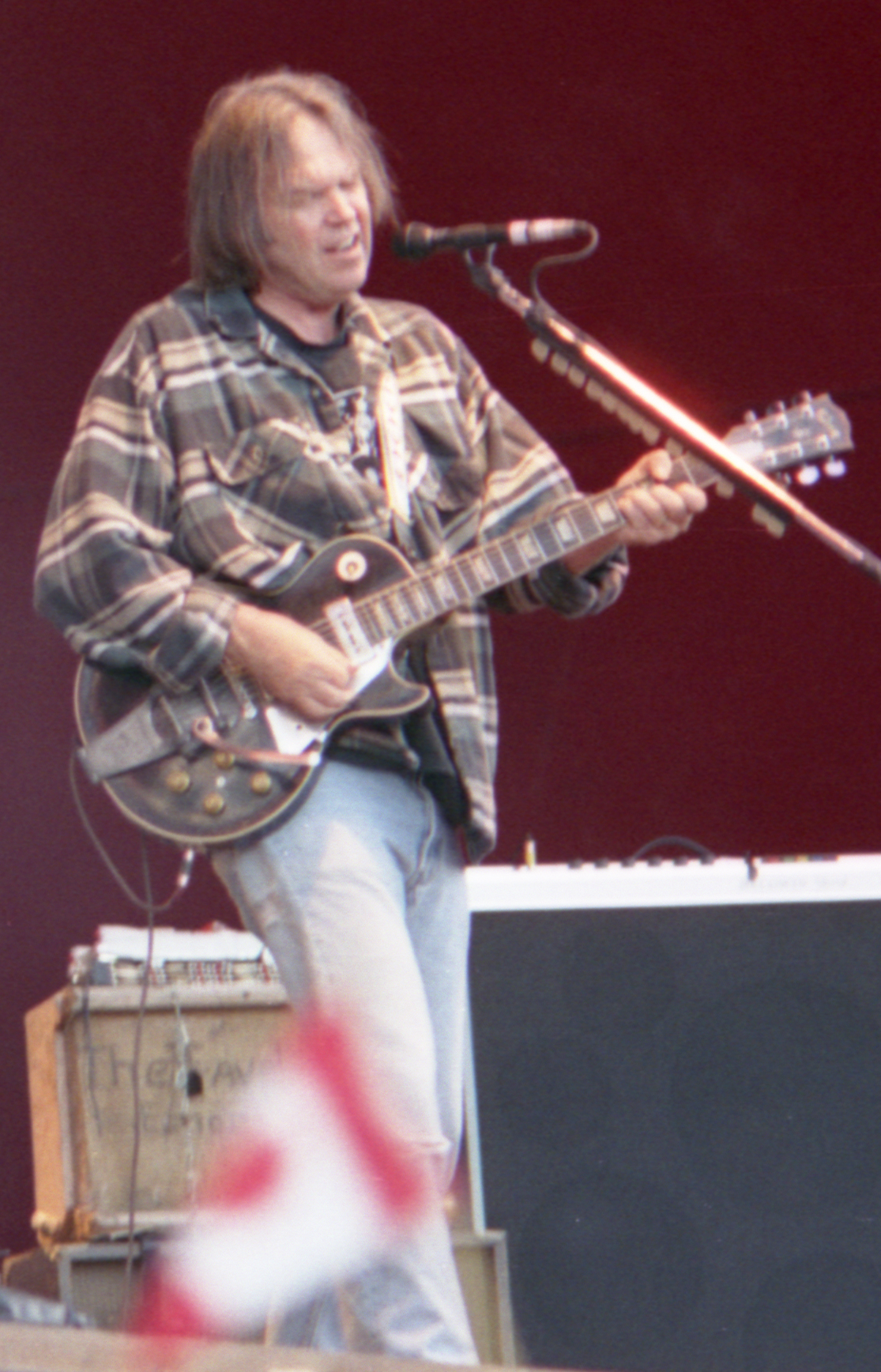
Bowie covered "I've Been Waiting for You" by Neil Young (pictured in 1996) for his 2002 album Heathen.

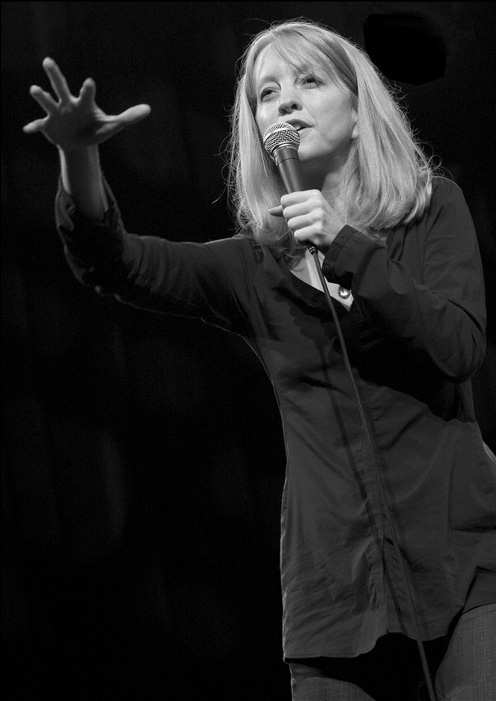
Bowie collaborated with bandleader Maria Schneider (pictured in 2008) for the 2014 song "Sue (Or in a Season of Crime)".

Name of song, writer(s), original release and year of release
Song	Writer(s)	Original release	Year	Ref.
"1917"	David Bowie; Reeves Gabrels	B-side of "Thursday's Child" (UK CD2)	1999	
"1984"	David Bowie	Diamond Dogs	1974	
"5:15 The Angels Have Gone"	David Bowie	Heathen	2002	
"'87 and Cry"	David Bowie	Never Let Me Down	1987	
"Abdulmajid"	David Bowie	"Heroes" (1991 reissue)	1991	
"Absolute Beginners"	David Bowie	Absolute Beginners (The Original Motion Picture Soundtrack)	1986	
"Across the Universe" (The Beatles cover)	John Lennon; Paul McCartney ‡	Young Americans	1975	
"Afraid"	David Bowie	Heathen	2002	
"African Night Flight"	David Bowie; Brian Eno	Lodger	1979	
"After All"	David Bowie	The Man Who Sold the World	1970	
"After Today" (Note: Recorded during the sessions for Young Americans in August 1974.)	David Bowie	Sound + Vision (box set)	1989	
"Alabama Song"	Bertolt Brecht; Kurt Weill ‡	Non-album single	1980	
"Aladdin Sane (1913–1938–197?)"	David Bowie	Aladdin Sane	1973	
"Algeria Touchshriek"	David Bowie; Brian Eno; Reeves Gabrels; Mike Garson; Erdal Kızılçay; Sterling Campbell	Outside	1995	
"All Saints"	David Bowie	Low (1991 reissue)	1991	
"All the Madmen"	David Bowie	The Man Who Sold the World	1970	
"All the Young Dudes" (Note: Bowie wrote "All the Young Dudes" for the English rock band Mott the Hoople. The recording, produced by Bowie, was released as a single in 1972 and became an anthem of glam rock. Bowie recorded his own studio version of the song in December 1972 during the sessions for Aladdin Sane (1973), but this version remained unreleased until 1995 when it appeared on the compilation album RarestOneBowie. Bowie performed a cabaret-style live rendition during the 1974 Diamond Dogs Tour, which appeared on David Live (1974).) (live)	David Bowie	David Live	1974	
"Always Crashing in the Same Car"	David Bowie	Low	1977	
"Amsterdam" (Jacques Brel cover)	Jacques Brel; Mort Shuman ‡	B-side of "Sorrow"	1973	
"Andy Warhol"	David Bowie	Hunky Dory	1971	
"Angel, Angel, Grubby Face" (demo)	David Bowie	Spying Through a Keyhole	2019	
"Animal Farm" (demo)	David Bowie	Conversation Piece	2019	
"Anyway, Anyhow, Anywhere" (The Who cover)	Roger Daltrey; Pete Townshend ‡	Pin Ups	1973	
"April's Tooth of Gold" (demo)	David Bowie	Conversation Piece	2019	
"Art Decade"	David Bowie	Low	1977	
"As the World Falls Down"	David Bowie	Labyrinth	1986	
"Ashes to Ashes"	David Bowie	Scary Monsters (and Super Creeps)	1980	
"Atomica"	David Bowie	The Next Day Extra	2013	
"Baal's Hymn"	Bertolt Brecht; Dominic Muldowney ‡	Baal (EP)	1982	
"Baby Grace (A Horrid Cassette)"	David Bowie; Brian Eno; Reeves Gabrels; Mike Garson; Erdal Kızılçay; Sterling Campbell	Outside	1995	
"Ballad of the Adventurers"	Bertolt Brecht; Dominic Muldowney ‡	Baal (EP)	1982	
"Bang Bang" (Iggy Pop cover)	Iggy Pop; Ivan Kral ‡	Never Let Me Down	1987	
"Bars of the County Jail"	David Bowie	Early On (1964–1966)	1991	
"Battle for Britain (The Letter)"	David Bowie; Reeves Gabrels; Mark Plati	Earthling	1997	
"Be My Wife"	David Bowie	Low	1977	
"Beat of Your Drum"	David Bowie	Never Let Me Down	1987	
"Beauty and the Beast"	David Bowie	"Heroes"	1977	
"Because You're Young"	David Bowie	Scary Monsters (and Super Creeps)	1980	
"A Better Future"	David Bowie	Heathen	2002	
"The Bewlay Brothers"	David Bowie	Hunky Dory	1971	
"Big Brother"	David Bowie	Diamond Dogs	1974	
"Black Country Rock"	David Bowie	The Man Who Sold the World	1970	
"Black Tie White Noise" (with Al B. Sure!)	David Bowie	Black Tie White Noise	1993	
"Blackout"	David Bowie	"Heroes"	1977	
"Blackstar"	David Bowie	Blackstar	2015	
"Bleed Like a Craze, Dad"	David Bowie	The Buddha of Suburbia	1993	
"Blue Jean"	David Bowie	Tonight	1984	
"Bombers"	David Bowie	Hunky Dory (1990 reissue)	1990	
"Born in a UFO"	David Bowie	The Next Day Extra	2013	
"Boss of Me"	David Bowie; Gerry Leonard	The Next Day	2013	
"Boys Keep Swinging"	David Bowie; Brian Eno	Lodger	1979	
"Breaking Glass"	David Bowie; Dennis Davis; George Murray	Low	1977	
"Brilliant Adventure"	David Bowie; Reeves Gabrels	Hours	1999	
"Bring Me the Disco King"	David Bowie	Reality	2003	
"Buddha of Suburbia"	David Bowie	The Buddha of Suburbia	1993	
"Buddha of Suburbia" (Note: A new version featuring Lenny Kravitz on guitar was released as a single.) (with Lenny Kravitz)	David Bowie	The Buddha of Suburbia	1993	
"Cactus" (Pixies cover)	Black Francis ‡	Heathen	2002	
"Can You Hear Me?"	David Bowie	Young Americans	1975	
"Candidate"	David Bowie	Diamond Dogs	1974	
"Cat People (Putting Out Fire)" (Note: A re-recorded version appears on Let's Dance (1983).)	David Bowie; Giorgio Moroder	Cat People (Original Soundtrack)	1982	
"Changes"	David Bowie	Hunky Dory	1971	
"Chant of the Ever Circling Skeletal Family"	David Bowie	Diamond Dogs	1974	
"Chilly Down"	David Bowie	Labyrinth	1986	
"China Girl" (Note: Bowie produced and co-wrote Iggy Pop's original version, released on The Idiot (1977).) (Iggy Pop cover)	David Bowie; Iggy Pop	Let's Dance	1983	
"Ching-a-Ling"	David Bowie	Love You till Tuesday	1984	
"Come and Buy My Toys"	David Bowie	David Bowie	1967	
"Conversation Piece"	David Bowie	B-side of "The Prettiest Star"	1970	
"Cracked Actor"	David Bowie	Aladdin Sane	1973	
"Criminal World" (Metro cover)	Peter Godwin; Duncan Browne; Sean Lyons ‡	Let's Dance	1983	
"Crystal Japan"	David Bowie	Non-album single	1980	
"Cygnet Committee"	David Bowie	David Bowie (Space Oddity)	1969	
"Dancing Out in Space"	David Bowie	The Next Day	2013	
"Dancing with the Big Boys" (with Iggy Pop)	David Bowie; Iggy Pop; Carlos Alomar	Tonight	1984	
"Day-In Day-Out"	David Bowie	Never Let Me Down	1987	
"Days"	David Bowie	Reality	2003	
"Dead Against It"	David Bowie	The Buddha of Suburbia	1993	
"Dead Man Walking"	David Bowie; Reeves Gabrels	Earthling	1997	
"Diamond Dogs"	David Bowie	Diamond Dogs	1974	
"Did You Ever Have a Dream"	David Bowie	B-side of "Love You till Tuesday"	1967	
"Dirty Boys"	David Bowie	The Next Day	2013	
"The Dirty Song"	Bertolt Brecht; Dominic Muldowney ‡	Baal (EP)	1982	
"D.J."	David Bowie; Brian Eno; Carlos Alomar	Lodger	1979	
"Do Anything You Say"	David Bowie	Non-album single	1966	
"Dodo" (Note: First released as part of medley "1984/Dodo")	David Bowie	Sound + Vision (box set)	1989	
"Dollar Days"	David Bowie	Blackstar	2016	
"Don't Bring Me Down" (Pretty Things cover)	Johnnie Dee ‡	Pin Ups	1973	
"Don't Let Me Down & Down"	Tahra Mint Hembara; Martine Valmont ‡	Black Tie White Noise	1993	
"Don't Look Down" (Iggy Pop cover)	Iggy Pop; James Williamson ‡	Tonight	1984	
"Don't Sit Down"	David Bowie	David Bowie (Space Oddity)	1969	
"The Dreamers"	David Bowie; Reeves Gabrels	Hours	1999	
"Drive-In Saturday"	David Bowie	Aladdin Sane	1973	
"The Drowned Girl"	Bertolt Brecht; Kurt Weill ‡	Baal (EP)	1982	
"Eight Line Poem"	David Bowie	Hunky Dory	1971	
"Everyone Says 'Hi'"	David Bowie	Heathen	2002	
"Everything's Alright" (The Mojos cover)	Nicky Crouch; John Konrad; Simon Stavely; Stuart James; Keith Karlson ‡	Pin Ups	1973	
"Fall Dog Bombs the Moon"	David Bowie	Reality	2003	
"Fame" (Note: "Fame" was remixed and re-released in 1990 as "Fame '90".)	David Bowie; Carlos Alomar; John Lennon	Young Americans	1975	
"Fantastic Voyage"	David Bowie; Brian Eno	Lodger	1979	
"Fascination"	David Bowie; Luther Vandross	Young Americans	1975	
"Fashion"	David Bowie	Scary Monsters (and Super Creeps)	1980	
"Fill Your Heart"	Biff Rose; Paul Williams ‡	Hunky Dory	1971	
"Five Years"	David Bowie	The Rise and Fall of Ziggy Stardust and the Spiders from Mars	1972	
"Fly"	David Bowie	Reality (bonus disc)	2003	
"Footstompin'" / "I Wish I Could Shimmy Like My Sister Kate"	Aaron Collins; Ande Rand; Armand Piron; Clarence Williams ‡	RarestOneBowie	1974	
"Friday on My Mind" (The Easybeats cover)	George Young; Harry Vanda ‡	Pin Ups	1973	
"Future Legend"	David Bowie	Diamond Dogs	1974	
"Get Real"	David Bowie	Outside (Japanese bonus track)	1995	
"Girl Loves Me"	David Bowie	Blackstar	2016	
"Girls" (Note: Originally recorded by Tina Turner, Bowie recorded his own version during the sessions for Never Let Me Down (1987).) (Tina Turner cover)	David Bowie; Erdal Kızılçay	B-side of "Time Will Crawl"	1987	
"Glass Spider"	David Bowie	Never Let Me Down	1987	
"God Bless the Girl"	David Bowie	The Next Day Extra	2013	
"God Knows I'm Good"	David Bowie	David Bowie (Space Oddity)	1969	
"God Only Knows" (The Beach Boys cover)	Brian Wilson; Tony Asher ‡	Tonight	1984	
"Golden Years"	David Bowie	Station to Station	1975	
"Good Morning Girl"	David Bowie	B-side of "Do Anything You Say"	1966	
"Goodbye 3d (Threepenny) Joe" (demo)	David Bowie	Spying Through a Keyhole	2019	
"The Gospel According to Tony Day"	David Bowie	B-side of "The Laughing Gnome"	1967	
"Growin' Up" (Bruce Springsteen cover)	Bruce Springsteen ‡	Pin Ups (1990 reissue)	1990	
"Hallo Spaceboy" (Note: A re-recorded version featuring Pet Shop Boys was released as a single in 1996.)	David Bowie; Brian Eno	Outside	1995	
"Hang On to Yourself" (Note: Original version recorded by Bowie's band Arnold Corns released as B-side to the "Moonage Daydream" non-album single in 1971, and later re-recorded by Bowie for the 1972 album The Rise and Fall of Ziggy Stardust and the Spiders from Mars.)	David Bowie	The Rise and Fall of Ziggy Stardust and the Spiders from Mars	1971	
"The Hearts Filthy Lesson"	David Bowie; Brian Eno; Reeves Gabrels; Mike Garson; Erdal Kızılçay; Sterling Campbell	Outside	1995	
"Heat"	David Bowie	The Next Day	2013	
"Heathen (The Rays)"	David Bowie	Heathen	2002	
"Here Comes the Night" (Them cover)	Bert Berns ‡	Pin Ups	1973	
"Here Today, Gone Tomorrow" (Ohio Players cover)	Leroy Bonner; Joe Harris; Marshall Jones; Ralph Middlebrooks; Dutch Robinson; Clarence Satchell; Gary Webster ‡	David Live (1990 reissue)	1990	
"'Heroes'" (Note: Bowie recorded separate versions of "'Heroes'" with German and French lyrics, titled "'Helden'" and "'Héros'", respectively. These versions were released as singles in their respective countries, and later appeared on various compilation albums.)	David Bowie; Brian Eno	"Heroes"	1977	
"Hole in the Ground"	David Bowie	Toy (Note: Toy was an unreleased album, originally intended for release in 2001, its tracks were leaked to the internet in 2011 and officially issued in 2021.)	2021	
"Holy Holy" (Note: A "more energetic" re-recording was released as the B-side to "Diamond Dogs" in 1974.)	David Bowie	Non-album single	1971	
"How Does the Grass Grow?"	David Bowie; Jerry Lordan	The Next Day	2013	
"I Can't Explain" (The Who cover)	Pete Townshend ‡	Pin Ups	1973	
"I Can't Give Everything Away"	David Bowie	Blackstar	2016	
"I Can't Read" (Note: Originally recorded by Tin Machine for their debut album in 1989. An acoustic re-recording, titled "I Can't Read '97", recorded in 1997 during the Earthling sessions, was released in 2020.)	David Bowie; Reeves Gabrels	The Ice Storm (soundtrack)	1997	
"I Dig Everything" (Note: A remake was recorded in mid-2000 during the sessions for Toy, which saw official release in 2021.)	David Bowie	Non-album single	1966	
"I Feel Free" (Cream cover)	Jack Bruce; Pete Brown ‡	Black Tie White Noise	1993	
"I Have Not Been to Oxford Town"	David Bowie; Brian Eno	Outside	1995	
"I Keep Forgettin'" (Chuck Jackson cover)	Jerry Leiber; Mike Stoller; Gil Garfield ‡	Tonight	1984	
"I Know It's Gonna Happen Someday" (Morrissey cover)	Morrissey; Mark E. Nevin ‡	Black Tie White Noise	1993	
"I Pray, Olé"	David Bowie	Lodger (1991 reissue)	1991	
"I Took a Trip on a Gemini Spaceship"	Norman Carl Odam ‡	Heathen	2002	
"I Want My Baby Back"	David Bowie	Early On (1964–1966)	1991	
"I Wish You Would" (Billy Boy Arnold cover)	Billy Boy Arnold ‡	Pin Ups	1973	
"I Would Be Your Slave"	David Bowie	Heathen	2002	
"I'd Rather Be High"	David Bowie	The Next Day	2013	
"I'll Take You There"	David Bowie; Gerry Leonard	The Next Day Extra	2013	
"I'm Afraid of Americans" (Note: Originally written during Bowie's studio sessions for the 1995 album Outside but was not released until a rough mix appeared on the soundtrack to the 1995 film Showgirls, and was subsequently remade for Bowie's 1997 album Earthling.)	David Bowie; Brian Eno	Showgirls (soundtrack)	1995	
"I'm Deranged"	David Bowie; Brian Eno	Outside	1995	
"I'm Not Losing Sleep"	David Bowie	B-side of "I Dig Everything"	1966	
"I'm Not Quite" (demo)	David Bowie	The 'Mercury' Demos	2019	
"I've Been Waiting for You" (Neil Young cover)	Neil Young ‡	Heathen	2002	
"Ian Fish, U.K. Heir"	David Bowie	The Buddha of Suburbia	1993	
"If I'm Dreaming My Life"	David Bowie; Reeves Gabrels	Hours	1999	
"If You Can See Me"	David Bowie	The Next Day	2013	
"In the Heat of the Morning"	David Bowie	The World of David Bowie	1970	
"The Informer"	David Bowie	The Next Day Extra	2013	
"It Ain't Easy"	Ron Davies ‡	The Rise and Fall of Ziggy Stardust and the Spiders from Mars	1972	
"It's Gonna Be Me"	David Bowie	Young Americans (1991 reissue)	1991	
"It's Hard to Be a Saint in the City" (Bruce Springsteen cover)	Bruce Springsteen ‡	Sound + Vision (box set)	1989	
"It's No Game (No. 1)" (Note: "It's No Game" was adapted from an unreleased song titled "Tired of My Life", which Bowie demoed in 1970. He claimed to have written it as early as 1963.)	David Bowie; Hisahi Miura	Scary Monsters (and Super Creeps)	1980	
"It's No Game (No. 2)"	David Bowie	Scary Monsters (and Super Creeps)	1980	
"Janine"	David Bowie	David Bowie (Space Oddity)	1969	
"The Jean Genie"	David Bowie	Aladdin Sane	1973	
"Jerusalem" (demo)	David Bowie	Conversation Piece	2019	
"Joe the Lion"	David Bowie	"Heroes"	1977	
"John, I'm Only Dancing" (Note: "John, I'm Only Dancing" was released in two versions. While the original recording was released in September 1972, a re-recording featuring saxophone, dubbed the "sax version", was released as a single in April 1973 with the same catalogue number and B-side as the original single.)	David Bowie	Non-album single	1972	
"John, I'm Only Dancing (Again)" (Note: A funk reworking of "John, I'm Only Dancing" that was recorded during the sessions for Young Americans in 1974. While performed live and intended for release on Young Americans, it remained unreleased until it appeared as a single in 1979.)	David Bowie	Non-album single	1979	
"Join the Gang"	David Bowie	David Bowie	1967	
"Julie"	David Bowie	B-side of "Day-In Day-Out"	1987	
"Jump They Say"	David Bowie	Black Tie White Noise	1993	
"Karma Man"	David Bowie	The World of David Bowie	1970	
"Killing a Little Time"	David Bowie	No Plan (EP)	2017	
"Kingdom Come"	Tom Verlaine ‡	Scary Monsters (and Super Creeps)	1980	
"Knock on Wood" (live) (Eddie Floyd cover)	Eddie Floyd; Steve Cropper ‡	David Live	1974	
"Kooks"	David Bowie	Hunky Dory	1971	
"Lady Grinning Soul"	David Bowie	Aladdin Sane	1973	
"Lady Stardust"	David Bowie	The Rise and Fall of Ziggy Stardust and the Spiders from Mars	1972	
"The Last Thing You Should Do"	David Bowie; Reeves Gabrels; Mark Plati	Earthling	1997	
"The Laughing Gnome"	David Bowie	Non-album single	1967	
"Law (Earthlings on Fire)"	David Bowie; Reeves Gabrels; Mark Plati	Earthling	1997	
"Lazarus"	David Bowie	Blackstar	2015	
"Leon Takes Us Outside"	David Bowie; Brian Eno; Reeves Gabrels; Mike Garson; Erdal Kızılçay; Sterling Campbell	Outside	1995	
"Let Me Sleep Beside You"	David Bowie	The World of David Bowie	1970	
"Let's Dance"	David Bowie	Let's Dance	1983	
"Let's Spend the Night Together" (The Rolling Stones cover)	Mick Jagger; Keith Richards ‡	Aladdin Sane	1973	
"Letter to Hermione"	David Bowie	David Bowie (Space Oddity)	1969	
"Life Is a Circus" (demo)	Roger Bunn ‡	Clareville Grove Demos	2019	
"Life on Mars?"	David Bowie	Hunky Dory	1971	
"Lightning Frightening"	David Bowie	The Man Who Sold the World (1990 reissue)	1990	
"Like a Rocket Man"	David Bowie	The Next Day Extra	2013	
"Little Bombardier"	David Bowie	David Bowie	1967	
"Little Wonder"	David Bowie; Reeves Gabrels; Mark Plati	Earthling	1997	
"The London Boys"	David Bowie	B-side of "Rubber Band"	1966	
"London Bye Ta-Ta"	David Bowie	Sound + Vision (box set)	1989	
"The Loneliest Guy"	David Bowie	Reality	2003	
"Look Back in Anger" (Note: Rerecorded in 1988 for an ICA benefit concert. Later appearing as a bonus track on Lodger, it was Bowie's first studio recording with Reeves Gabrels.)	David Bowie; Brian Eno	Lodger	1979	
"Looking for Lester"	David Bowie; Nile Rodgers	Black Tie White Noise	1993	
"Looking for Satellites"	David Bowie; Reeves Gabrels; Mark Plati	Earthling	1997	
"Looking for Water"	David Bowie	Reality	2003	
"Love All Around" (demo)	David Bowie	Spying Through a Keyhole	2019	
"Love Is Lost" (Note: "Love Is Lost" was remixed by James Murphy of LCD Soundsystem. The remix, titled "Hello Steve Reich Mix", was released on The Next Day Extra.)	David Bowie	The Next Day	2013	
"Love Missile F1 Eleven" (Sigue Sigue Sputnik cover)	Martin Degville; Tony James; Neal Whitmore ‡	B-side of "New Killer Star"	2003	
"Love Song" (demo)	Leslie Duncan ‡	The 'Mercury' Demos	2019	
"Love You till Tuesday" (Note: A re-recorded version was released as a single in July 1967.)	David Bowie	David Bowie	1967	
"Lover to the Dawn" (demo)	David Bowie	Clareville Grove Demos	2019	
"Loving the Alien"	David Bowie	Tonight	1984	
"Lucy Can't Dance"	David Bowie	Black Tie White Noise (CD bonus track)	1993	
"Magic Dance"	David Bowie	Labyrinth	1986	
"Maid of Bond Street"	David Bowie	David Bowie	1967	
"The Man Who Sold the World" (Note: An acoustic re-recorded version from the Earthling sessions was released in 2020.)	David Bowie	The Man Who Sold the World	1970	
"Memory of a Free Festival" (Note: "Memory of a Free Festival" was re-recorded between March–April 1970 at the insistence of Mercury Records, who felt it would be a bigger hit in America than Bowie's latest single "The Prettiest Star". This single version was released in June 1970.)	David Bowie	David Bowie (Space Oddity)	1969	
"Miracle Goodnight"	David Bowie	Black Tie White Noise	1993	
"Modern Love"	David Bowie	Let's Dance	1983	
"Moonage Daydream"	David Bowie	The Rise and Fall of Ziggy Stardust and the Spiders from Mars	1971	
"Moss Garden"	David Bowie; Brian Eno	"Heroes"	1977	
"The Motel"	David Bowie	Outside	1995	
"Mother" (Note: Bowie recorded a cover of John Lennon's song "Mother", from his 1970 album John Lennon/Plastic Ono Band, in August 1998 for a tribute album being compiled by Lennon's widow Yoko Ono. The tribute album was scrapped and Bowie's version remained unreleased until 2021, when it was released as a single to celebrate what would have been Bowie's 74th birthday.) (John Lennon cover)	John Lennon ‡	Non-album single	2021	
"Mother Grey" (demo)	David Bowie	Spying Through a Keyhole	2019	
"Move On"	David Bowie	Lodger	1979	
"My Death" (live) (Scott Walker cover)	Jacques Brel; Mort Shuman ‡	Ziggy Stardust: The Motion Picture	1983	
"The Mysteries"	David Bowie	The Buddha of Suburbia	1993	
"Nathan Adler (I)"	David Bowie; Brian Eno; Reeves Gabrels; Mike Garson; Erdal Kızılçay; Sterling Campbell	Outside	1995	
"Nathan Adler (II)"	David Bowie; Brian Eno	Outside	1995	
"Neighborhood Threat" (Note: Bowie co-produced and played piano on Iggy Pop's original version on Lust for Life (1977).) (Iggy Pop cover)	David Bowie; Iggy Pop; Ricky Gardiner	Tonight	1984	
"Neuköln"	David Bowie; Brian Eno	"Heroes"	1977	
"Never Get Old"	David Bowie	Reality	2003	
"Never Let Me Down"	David Bowie; Carlos Alomar	Never Let Me Down	1987	
"New Angels of Promise"	David Bowie; Reeves Gabrels	Hours	1999	
"A New Career in a New Town"	David Bowie	Low	1977	
"New Killer Star"	David Bowie	Reality	2003	
"New York's in Love"	David Bowie	Never Let Me Down	1987	
"The Next Day"	David Bowie	The Next Day	2013	
"Nite Flights" (The Walker Brothers cover)	Noel Scott Engel ‡	Black Tie White Noise	1993	
"No Control"	David Bowie; Brian Eno	Outside	1995	
"No One Calls"	David Bowie; Reeves Gabrels	B-side of "Thursday's Child" (UK CD1)	1999	
"No Plan"	David Bowie	No Plan (EP)	2017	
"Nothing to Be Desired"	David Bowie	B-side of "The Hearts Filthy Lesson" (US single)	1995	
"Nuts"	David Bowie	Is It Any Wonder? (digital)	2020	
"An Occasional Dream"	David Bowie	David Bowie (Space Oddity)	1969	
"Oh! You Pretty Things"	David Bowie	Hunky Dory	1971	
"Outside"	Kevin Armstrong; David Bowie	Outside	1995	
"Pablo Picasso" (The Modern Lovers cover)	Jonathan Richman ‡	Reality	2003	
"Pallas Athena" (Note: Released as a single in 1997 under the name "Tao Jones Index")	David Bowie	Black Tie White Noise	1993	
"Panic in Detroit" (Note: A 1979 re-recorded version was released on the 1992 reissue of Scary Monsters by Rykodisc)	David Bowie	Aladdin Sane	1973	
"Pictures of Lily" (The Who cover)	Pete Townshend ‡	Substitute: The Songs of The Who	2001	
"Plan"	David Bowie	The Next Day Extra	2013	
"Please Mr. Gravedigger"	David Bowie	David Bowie	1967	
"The Prettiest Star" (Note: Original version released as a single in March 1970, a re-recorded version appears on Aladdin Sane (1973).)	David Bowie	Non-album single	1970	
"The Pretty Things Are Going to Hell"	David Bowie; Reeves Gabrels	Hours	1999	
"Queen Bitch"	David Bowie	Hunky Dory	1971	
"Queen of All the Tarts (Overture)"	David Bowie	Reality	2003	
"Quicksand"	David Bowie	Hunky Dory	1971	
"Ragazzo solo, ragazza sola" (Note: Re-recorded version of "Space Oddity" with Italian lyrics by Mogol)	David Bowie; Mogol	Non-album single	1970	
"Ramona A. Stone/I Am with Name"	David Bowie; Brian Eno; Reeves Gabrels; Mike Garson; Erdal Kızılçay; Sterling Campbell	Outside	1995	
"Real Cool World"	David Bowie	Songs from the Cool World (soundtrack)	1992	
"Reality"	David Bowie	Reality	2003	
"Rebel Never Gets Old" (Note: A mash-up, created by Endless Noise, of the songs "Rebel Rebel" (1974) and "Never Get Old" (2003).)	David Bowie	Non-album single	2004	
"Rebel Rebel" (Note: A re-recorded version appears on the soundtrack to Charlie's Angels: Full Throttle (2003) and the bonus disc of Reality (2003).)	David Bowie	Diamond Dogs	1974	
"Red Money"	David Bowie; Carlos Alomar	Lodger	1979	
"Red Sails"	David Bowie; Brian Eno	Lodger	1979	
"Remembering Marie A"	Traditional adapted by Bertolt Brecht & Dominic Muldowney ‡	Baal (EP)	1982	
"Repetition"	David Bowie	Lodger	1979	
"The Reverend Raymond Brown (Attends the Garden Fête on Thatchwick Green)" (demo)	David Bowie	Conversation Piece	2019	
"The Revolutionary Song" (Credited to "The Rebels")	David Bowie; Jack Fishman	Just a Gigolo (film)	1978	
"Ricochet"	David Bowie	Let's Dance	1983	
"Right"	David Bowie	Young Americans	1975	
"Rock 'n' Roll Suicide"	David Bowie	The Rise and Fall of Ziggy Stardust and the Spiders from Mars	1972	
"Rock 'n' Roll with Me"	David Bowie; Warren Peace	Diamond Dogs	1974	
"Rosalyn" (Pretty Things cover)	Jimmy Duncan; Bill Farley ‡	Pin Ups	1973	
"Round and Round" (Chuck Berry cover)	Chuck Berry ‡	B-side of "Drive-In Saturday"	1973	
"Rubber Band"	David Bowie	David Bowie	1966	
"Running Gun Blues"	David Bowie	The Man Who Sold the World	1970	
"Safe"	David Bowie	Heathen (SACD release)	2002	
"Saviour Machine"	David Bowie	The Man Who Sold the World	1970	
"Scary Monsters (And Super Creeps)"	David Bowie	Scary Monsters (and Super Creeps)	1980	
"Scream Like a Baby"	David Bowie	Scary Monsters (and Super Creeps)	1980	
"The Secret Life of Arabia"	David Bowie; Brian Eno; Carlos Alomar	"Heroes"	1977	
"See Emily Play" (Pink Floyd cover)	Syd Barrett ‡	Pin Ups	1973	
"Sell Me a Coat"	David Bowie	David Bowie	1967	
"Sense of Doubt"	David Bowie	"Heroes"	1977	
"Seven"	David Bowie; Reeves Gabrels	Hours	1999	
"Seven Years in Tibet"	David Bowie; Reeves Gabrels	Earthling	1997	
"Sex and the Church"	David Bowie	The Buddha of Suburbia	1993	
"Shadow Man" (Note: First recorded in 1971 during the sessions for The Rise and Fall of Ziggy Stardust and the Spiders from Mars, re-recorded in 2000 and released for the first time in 2002)	David Bowie	B-side of "Slow Burn"	2002	
"Shake It"	David Bowie	Let's Dance	1983	
"Shapes of Things" (The Yardbirds cover)	Paul Samwell-Smith; Jim McCarty; Keith Relf ‡	Pin Ups	1973	
"She Shook Me Cold"	David Bowie	The Man Who Sold the World	1970	
"She'll Drive the Big Car"	David Bowie	Reality	2003	
"She's Got Medals"	David Bowie	David Bowie	1967	
"Shilling the Rubes" (Note: An outtake recorded during the sessions for Young Americans.)	David Bowie	Unreleased	–	
"Shining Star (Makin' My Love)"	David Bowie	Never Let Me Down	1987	
"Silly Boy Blue"	David Bowie	David Bowie	1967	
"Sister Midnight" (live) (Iggy Pop cover)	David Bowie; Carlos Alomar; Iggy Pop	A Reality Tour	2010	
"Slip Away"	David Bowie	Heathen	2002	
"Slow Burn"	David Bowie	Heathen	2002	
"A Small Plot of Land"	David Bowie; Brian Eno; Reeves Gabrels; Mike Garson; Erdal Kızılçay; Sterling Campbell	Outside	1995	
"So She"	David Bowie	The Next Day Extra	2013	
"Some Are"	David Bowie	Low (1991 reissue)	1991	
"Somebody Up There Likes Me"	David Bowie	Young Americans	1975	
"Something in the Air"	David Bowie; Reeves Gabrels	Hours	1999	
"Song for Bob Dylan"	David Bowie	Hunky Dory	1971	
"Sons of the Silent Age"	David Bowie	"Heroes"	1977	
"Sorrow" (The Merseys cover)	Bob Feldman; Jerry Goldstein; Richard Gottehrer ‡	Pin Ups	1973	
"Soul Love"	David Bowie	The Rise and Fall of Ziggy Stardust and the Spiders from Mars	1972	
"Sound and Vision"	David Bowie	Low	1977	
"South Horizon"	David Bowie	The Buddha of Suburbia	1993	
"Space Oddity" (Note: A 1979 re-recorded version was released as the B-side of "Alabama Song" in 1980 and on the 1992 reissue of Scary Monsters by Rykodisc)	David Bowie	David Bowie (Space Oddity)	1969	
"Speed of Life"	David Bowie	Low	1977	
"Star"	David Bowie	The Rise and Fall of Ziggy Stardust and the Spiders from Mars	1972	
"Starman"	David Bowie	The Rise and Fall of Ziggy Stardust and the Spiders from Mars	1972	
"The Stars (Are Out Tonight)"	David Bowie	The Next Day	2013	
"Station to Station"	David Bowie	Station to Station	1976	
"Stay" (Note: A re-recorded version, titled "Stay '97", which Bowie recorded in 1997 during the Earthling sessions, was released in 2020.)	David Bowie	Station to Station	1976	
"Strangers When We Meet" (Note: A re-recorded version appears on Outside (1995).)	David Bowie	The Buddha of Suburbia	1993	
"Subterraneans"	David Bowie	Low	1977	
"Sue (Or in a Season of Crime)"	David Bowie; Maria Schneider; Paul Bateman; Bob Bhamra	Nothing Has Changed	2014	
"Suffragette City"	David Bowie	The Rise and Fall of Ziggy Stardust and the Spiders from Mars	1972	
"Sunday"	David Bowie	Heathen	2002	
"The Supermen" (Note: An alternate version recorded on 12 November 1971 during the sessions for The Rise and Fall of Ziggy Stardust and the Spiders from Mars, originally released on Revelations – A Musical Anthology for Glastonbury Fayre in July 1972, compiled by the organisers of the Glastonbury Festival at which Bowie had played in 1971, was released on the 1990 reissue of Hunky Dory.)	David Bowie	The Man Who Sold the World	1970	
"Survive"	David Bowie; Reeves Gabrels	Hours	1999	
"Sweet Head" (Note: Recorded in 1971 during the sessions for The Rise and Fall of Ziggy Stardust and the Spiders from Mars, but not released until 1990, when it was included as a bonus track on Rykodisc CD release of the album.)	David Bowie	The Rise and Fall of Ziggy Stardust and the Spiders from Mars (1990 reissue)	1990	
"Sweet Thing"	David Bowie	Diamond Dogs	1974	
"Sweet Thing (Reprise)"	David Bowie	Diamond Dogs	1974	
"Teenage Wildlife"	David Bowie	Scary Monsters (and Super Creeps)	1980	
"Telling Lies"	David Bowie	Earthling	1997	
"That's Motivation"	David Bowie	Absolute Beginners (soundtrack)	1986	
"That's Where My Heart Is"	David Bowie	Early On (1964–1966)	1991	
"There Is a Happy Land"	David Bowie	David Bowie	1967	
"Thru' These Architects Eyes"	David Bowie; Reeves Gabrels	Outside	1995	
"Thursday's Child"	David Bowie; Reeves Gabrels	Hours	1999	
"Time"	David Bowie	Aladdin Sane	1973	
"Time Will Crawl"	David Bowie	Never Let Me Down	1987	
"'Tis a Pity She Was a Whore"	David Bowie	B-side of "Sue (Or in a Season of Crime)"	2014	
"Tonight" (with Tina Turner) (Iggy Pop cover)	David Bowie; Iggy Pop	Tonight	1984	
"Too Dizzy" (Note: "Too Dizzy" has been deleted from subsequent reissues of Never Let Me Down at Bowie's request, reportedly because it was his least favourite track on the album.)	David Bowie; Erdal Kızılçay	Never Let Me Down	1987	
"Try Some, Buy Some" (Ronnie Spector cover)	George Harrison ‡	Reality	2003	
"Tryin' to Get to Heaven" (Note: Bowie recorded a cover of Bob Dylan's song "Tryin' to Get to Heaven", from his 1997 album Time Out of Mind, in 1998 and was intended to appear as a bonus track for a proposed Earthling Tour live album. The recording remained unreleased until 2021, when it was released as a single to celebrate what would have been Bowie's 74th birthday.) (Bob Dylan cover)	Bob Dylan ‡	B-side of "Mother"	2021	
"Tumble and Twirl"	David Bowie; Iggy Pop	Tonight	1984	
"TVC 15"	David Bowie	Station to Station	1976	
"Uncle Arthur"	David Bowie	David Bowie	1967	
"Underground"	David Bowie	Labyrinth	1986	
"Untitled No. 1"	David Bowie	The Buddha of Suburbia	1993	
"Unwashed and Somewhat Slightly Dazed"	David Bowie	David Bowie (Space Oddity)	1969	
"Up the Hill Backwards"	David Bowie	Scary Monsters (and Super Creeps)	1980	
"V-2 Schneider"	David Bowie	"Heroes"	1977	
"Valentine's Day"	David Bowie	The Next Day	2013	
"Velvet Goldmine" (Note: Recorded during the sessions for The Rise and Fall of Ziggy Stardust and the Spiders from Mars, but not released until 1975, when it appeared as the B-side to the single re-release of "Space Oddity".)	David Bowie	B-side of "Space Oddity" (re-release)	1975	
"Volare" (Domenico Modugno cover)	Franco Migliacci; Domenico Modugno ‡	Absolute Beginners (soundtrack)	1986	
"The Voyeur of Utter Destruction (as Beauty)"	David Bowie; Brian Eno; Reeves Gabrels	Outside	1995	
"Waiting for the Man" (live) (The Velvet Underground cover)	Lou Reed ‡	Live Santa Monica '72	2008	
"Warszawa"	David Bowie; Brian Eno	Low	1977	
"Watch That Man"	David Bowie	Aladdin Sane	1973	
"Waterloo Sunset" (The Kinks cover)	Ray Davies ‡	Reality (Japanese bonus disc)	2003	
"We All Go Through"	David Bowie; Reeves Gabrels	B-side of "Thursday's Child" (UK CD1)	1999	
"We Are Hungry Men"	David Bowie	David Bowie	1967	
"We Are the Dead"	David Bowie	Diamond Dogs	1974	
"We Prick You"	David Bowie; Brian Eno	Outside	1995	
"We Shall Go to Town"	David Bowie; Reeves Gabrels	B-side of "Thursday's Child" (UK CD2)	1999	
"The Wedding"	David Bowie	Black Tie White Noise	1993	
"The Wedding Song"	David Bowie	Black Tie White Noise	1993	
"Weeping Wall"	David Bowie	Low	1977	
"What in the World"	David Bowie	Low	1977	
"What's Really Happening?"	David Bowie; Reeves Gabrels; Alex Grant	Hours	1999	
"When I Live My Dream"	David Bowie	David Bowie	1967	
"When I Met You"	David Bowie	No Plan (EP)	2017	
"When I'm Five"	David Bowie	Love You till Tuesday	1984	
"When the Boys Come Marching Home"	David Bowie	Heathen (SACD release)	2002	
"When the Wind Blows"	David Bowie; Erdal Kızılçay	When the Wind Blows (soundtrack)	1986	
"Where Are We Now?"	David Bowie	The Next Day	2013	
"Where Have All the Good Times Gone" (The Kinks cover)	Ray Davies ‡	Pin Ups	1973	
"White Light/White Heat" (live) (The Velvet Underground cover)	Lou Reed ‡	Ziggy Stardust: The Motion Picture	1983	
"Who Can I Be Now?"	David Bowie	Young Americans (1991 reissue)	1991	
"The Width of a Circle"	David Bowie	The Man Who Sold the World	1970	
"Wild Eyed Boy from Freecloud"	David Bowie	David Bowie (Space Oddity)	1969	
"Wild Is the Wind" (Johnny Mathis cover)	Ned Washington; Dimitri Tiomkin ‡	Station to Station	1976	
"Win"	David Bowie	Young Americans	1975	
"Wishful Beginnings"	David Bowie; Brian Eno	Outside	1995	
"Within You"	David Bowie	Labyrinth	1986	
"Without You"	David Bowie	Let's Dance	1983	
"Wood Jackson"	David Bowie	B-side of "Slow Burn"	2002	
"Word on a Wing"	David Bowie	Station to Station	1976	
"Yassassin"	David Bowie	Lodger	1979	
"You Feel So Lonely You Could Die"	David Bowie	The Next Day	2013	
"(You Will) Set the World on Fire"	David Bowie	The Next Day	2013	
"Your Funny Smile" (Note: Recorded in 1966 during the sessions for Bowie's 1967 debut album. It was replaced on the album by "Rubber Band".)	David Bowie	Unreleased	–	
"Your Turn to Drive" (Note: A new version, titled "Toy (Your Turn to Drive)", appears on Toy (2021).)	David Bowie	Nothing Has Changed	2014	
"You've Been Around"	David Bowie; Reeves Gabrels	Black Tie White Noise	1993	
"Young Americans"	David Bowie	Young Americans	1975	
"Zeroes"	David Bowie	Never Let Me Down	1987	
"Ziggy Stardust"	David Bowie	The Rise and Fall of Ziggy Stardust and the Spiders from Mars	1972	

== Collaborative songs ==
Name of song, artist(s), writer(s), original release and year of release
Song	Artist credit	Writer(s)	Original release	Year	Ref.
"Amazing"	Tin Machine	David Bowie; Reeves Gabrels	Tin Machine	1989	
"Amlapura"	Tin Machine	David Bowie; Reeves Gabrels	Tin Machine II	1991	
"And I Say to Myself"	David Bowie with the Lower Third	David Bowie	B-side of "Can't Help Thinking About Me"	1966	
"Baby Can Dance"	Tin Machine	David Bowie	Tin Machine	1989	
"Baby Loves That Way"	Davy Jones and the Lower Third	David Bowie	B-side of "You've Got a Habit of Leaving"	1965	
"Baby Universal"	Tin Machine	David Bowie; Reeves Gabrels	Tin Machine II	1991	
"Betty Wrong"	Tin Machine	David Bowie; Reeves Gabrels	Tin Machine II	1991	
"A Big Hurt"	Tin Machine	David Bowie	Tin Machine II	1991	
"Bus Stop"	Tin Machine	David Bowie; Reeves Gabrels	Tin Machine	1989	
"Can't Help Thinking About Me"	David Bowie with the Lower Third	David Bowie	Non-album single	1966	
"Cosmic Dancer" (Note: Bowie made a surprise appearance during the encore of a Morrissey concert on 6 February 1991 in Los Angeles. The two sang a duet of the T. Rex song "Cosmic Dancer", from their 1971 album Electric Warrior. Originally unavailable for many years, Morrissey released the performance as a single in 2020.) (live)	David Bowie and Morrissey	Marc Bolan ‡	Non-album single	2020	
"Crack City"	Tin Machine	David Bowie	Tin Machine	1989	
"The Cynic"	Kashmir featuring David Bowie	Kasper Eistrup ‡	No Balance Palace	2005	
"Dancing in the Street" (Martha and the Vandellas cover)	David Bowie and Mick Jagger	Marvin Gaye; William "Mickey" Stevenson; Ivy Jo Hunter ‡	Non-album single	1985	
"Falling Down"	Scarlett Johansson	Tom Waits ‡	Anywhere I Lay My Head	2008	
"Fannin Street"	Scarlett Johansson	Tom Waits ‡	Anywhere I Lay My Head	2008	
"A Foggy Day (in London Town)"	David Bowie and Angelo Badalamenti	George Gershwin; Ira Gershwin ‡	Red Hot + Rhapsody: The Gershwin Groove	1998	
"Glad I've Got Nobody"	Davy Jones and the Lower Third	David Bowie	Early On (1964–1966)	1991	
"Goodbye Mr. Ed"	Tin Machine	David Bowie; Hunt Sales; Tony Fox Sales	Tin Machine II	1991	
"Gunman"	Adrian Belew (featuring David Bowie)	David Bowie; Adrian Belew	Young Lions	1990	
"Hammerhead"	Tin Machine	David Bowie; Hunt Sales	Tin Machine II	1991	
"Heaven's in Here"	Tin Machine	David Bowie	Tin Machine	1989	
"Hop Frog"	Lou Reed featuring David Bowie	Lou Reed ‡	The Raven	2003	
"I'll Follow You"	Davy Jones and the Lower Third	David Bowie	Early On (1964–1966)	1991	
"I Can't Read"	Tin Machine	David Bowie; Reeves Gabrels	Tin Machine	1989	
"I Pity the Fool" (Bobby Bland cover)	Davy Jones and the Manish Boys	Deadric Malone ‡	Non-album single	1965	
"I Want Your Love"	Davy Jones and the Lower Third	David Bowie	The Shel Talmy Recordings	2026	
"If There Is Something" (Roxy Music cover)	Tin Machine	Bryan Ferry ‡	Tin Machine II	1991	
"Isn't It Evening (The Revolutionary)"	Earl Slick and David Bowie	Earl Slick; David Bowie	Zig Zag	2003	
"Jewel"	Reeves Gabrels featuring David Bowie, Frank Black and Dave Grohl	Reeves Gabrels; David Bowie; Frank Black; Mark Plati	Ulysses (Della Notte)	1999	
"Just for One Day (Heroes)"	David Guetta vs. David Bowie	David Bowie; Brian Eno	Just a Little More Love	2003	
"The King of Stamford Hill"	Reeves Gabrels featuring David Bowie	Reeves Gabrels; David Bowie	The Sacred Squall of Now	1995	
"Like a Rolling Stone" (Bob Dylan cover)	Mick Ronson featuring David Bowie	Bob Dylan ‡	Heaven and Hull	1994	
"Liza Jane"	Davie Jones with the King Bees	Leslie Conn ‡	Non-album single	1964	
"Louie, Louie Go Home"	Davie Jones with the King Bees	Paul Revere; Mark Lindsay ‡	B-side of "Liza Jane"	1964	
"Nature Boy" (Nat King Cole cover)	David Bowie and Massive Attack	Eden Ahbez ‡	Moulin Rouge! Music from Baz Luhrmann's Film	2001	
"One Shot"	Tin Machine	David Bowie; Reeves Gabrels; Hunt Sales; Tony Fox Sales	Tin Machine II	1991	
"Peace on Earth/Little Drummer Boy"	David Bowie and Bing Crosby	Ian Fraser; Larry Grossman; Alan Kohan; Harry Simeone; K.K. Davis; Henry Onorati ‡	Non-album single	1982	
Peter and the Wolf (Note: Music by the Philadelphia Orchestra, conducted by Eugene Ormandy, with narration by Bowie.)	Philadelphia Orchestra with David Bowie	Sergei Prokofiev ‡	David Bowie Narrates Prokofiev's Peter and the Wolf	1978	
"Perfect Day" (Note: Bowie co-produced Reed's original version of "Perfect Day" with Mick Ronson.) (Lou Reed cover)	Various Artists	Lou Reed ‡	Non-album single	1997	
"Piano-La" (demo)	David Bowie and John Cale	David Bowie; John Cale	Unreleased	– (Note: Recorded in 1979)	
"Planet of Dreams"	David Bowie and Gail Ann Dorsey	David Bowie; Gail Ann Dorsey	Long Live Tibet	1997	
"Pretty Pink Rose"	Adrian Belew (featuring David Bowie)	David Bowie	Young Lions	1990	
"Pretty Thing"	Tin Machine	David Bowie	Tin Machine	1989	
"Prisoner of Love"	Tin Machine	David Bowie; Reeves Gabrels; Hunt Sales; Tony Fox Sales	Tin Machine	1989	
"Province"	TV on the Radio featuring David Bowie	Kyp Malone; David Andrew Sitek ‡	Return to Cookie Mountain	2006	
"Pug Nosed Face"	David Bowie	David Bowie; Ricky Gervais; Stephen Merchant	Extras (TV series)	2006	
"Run"	Tin Machine	David Bowie; Kevin Armstrong	Tin Machine	1989	
"Sacrifice Yourself"	Tin Machine	David Bowie; Hunt Sales; Tony Fox Sales	Tin Machine	1989	
"Saviour"	Kristeen Young featuring David Bowie	Kristeen Young ‡	Breasticles	2003	
"Sector Z"	Rustic Overtones featuring David Bowie	Dave Gutter ‡	¡Viva Nueva!	2001	
"(She Can) Do That"	David Bowie and BT	David Bowie; Brian Transeau	Stealth: Music from the Motion Picture	2005	
"Shopping for Girls"	Tin Machine	David Bowie; Reeves Gabrels	Tin Machine II	1991	
"Sorry"	Tin Machine	Hunt Sales ‡	Tin Machine II	1991	
"Stateside"	Tin Machine	David Bowie; Hunt Sales	Tin Machine II	1991	
"This Is Not America"	David Bowie and Pat Metheny Group	David Bowie; Pat Metheny; Lyle Mays	The Falcon and the Snowman (soundtrack)	1985	
"Tin Machine"	Tin Machine	David Bowie; Reeves Gabrels; Hunt Sales; Tony Fox Sales	Tin Machine	1989	
"Truth"	Goldie featuring David Bowie	Goldie ‡	Saturnz Return	1998	
"Under Pressure"	Queen and David Bowie	Freddie Mercury; Brian May; Roger Taylor; John Deacon; David Bowie	Non-album single	1981	
"Under the God"	Tin Machine	David Bowie	Tin Machine	1989	
"Velvet Couch" (demo)	David Bowie and John Cale	David Bowie; John Cale	Unreleased	–	
"Video Crime"	Tin Machine	David Bowie; Hunt Sales; Tony Fox Sales	Tin Machine	1989	
"Wake Up" (live)	Arcade Fire and David Bowie	Will Butler; Win Butler; Régine Chassagne; Tim Kingsbury; Richard Reed Parry ‡	Live EP (Live at Fashion Rocks)	2005	
"Without You I'm Nothing"	Placebo featuring David Bowie	Steve Hewitt; Brian Molko; Stefan Olsdal ‡	Without You I'm Nothing	1998	
"Working Class Hero" (John Lennon cover)	Tin Machine	John Lennon ‡	Tin Machine	1989	
"You Belong in Rock n' Roll"	Tin Machine	David Bowie; Reeves Gabrels	Tin Machine II	1991	
"You Can't Talk"	Tin Machine	David Bowie; Reeves Gabrels; Hunt Sales; Tony Fox Sales	Tin Machine II	1991	
"You've Been Around" (Note: A new solo version by Gabrels different from Bowie's version on Black Tie White Noise.)	Reeves Gabrels featuring David Bowie	David Bowie; Reeves Gabrels	The Sacred Squall of Now	1995	
"You've Got a Habit of Leaving"	Davy Jones and the Lower Third	David Bowie	Non-album single	1965	
