= No Plan =

No Plan may refer to:

- No Plan (owarai), Japanese comedy trio band
- No Plan (EP), David Bowie
- "No Plan", song by David Bowie from No Plan (EP)
- No Plans, album by Australian rock band Cold Chisel 2012
