= X (Kristeen Young album) =

Studio album by Kristeen Young
- Released: August 2004
- Recorded: December 2003
- Genres: Glam rock; indie pop; alternative rock
- Length: 43:36
- Labels: TVPI; Self-released
- Producer: Tony Visconti

Kristeen Young chronology
Breasticles (2003)	X (2004)	The Orphans (2006)

X is the fourth studio album by American singer-songwriter Kristeen Young. It is themed around various reversals of, and thoughts on, the Ten Commandments.

The album was produced by Tony Visconti and engineered by Mario J. McNulty at Studio B, Looking Glass Studios. It features "Baby" Jeff White on drums, David Matos on guitar and a duet with Placebo's Brian Molko on No Other God.

== Track listing ==
1. "No Other God" (with Brian Molko)– 3:07
2. "Commit Adultery" – 3:11
3. "Kill It" – 4:02
4. "Lie" – 4:01
5. "Cold Steal" – 4:20
6. "Goddamn You, You Scenesters" – 3:34
7. "Yesterday's Future Man" – 4:03
8. "I Own The Best Of All Things" – 3:29
9. "My TV" – 4:00
10. "Devil Girl" – 4:55
11. "Credits" (read by David Matos) – 1:49
12. "No Other God' - 3:09
