= Enemy (Kristeen Young album) =

Studio album by Kristeen Young
- Released: March 3, 1999
- Recorded: 1999
- Genres: Glam rock; indie pop; alternative rock
- Label: Test Tube Baby

Kristeen Young chronology
Meet Miss Young and Her All Boy Band (1997)	Enemy (1999)	Breasticles (2003)

Enemy is the second studio album by American rock musician Kristeen Young, recorded and released in 1999.

== Track listing ==
Music composed by Kristeen Young and Jeff White; lyrics by Kristeen Young

1. "Year of the Woman" -
2. "Night Blindness" -
3. "Take Me" -
4. "I'm Sorry" -
5. "Mouth to Mouth" -
6. "Lucia" -
7. "Laurel" -
8. "Skeletons" -
9. "Sacrifice" -
10. "The Good Night" -
11. "Have You Ever Worked With Anything Hi-Tek?" -
12. "Incubator" -
13. "Boomerang" -
14. "Nothing" -
15. "Enemy" -

== Personnel ==
The Band

- Kristeen Young - vocals, keyboards
- Brian Ion - bass
- "Baby" Jeff White - drums
