= The Orphans =

Studio album by Kristeen Young
- Released: November 2006
- Recorded: January–February 2006
- Genre: Glam rock; indie pop; alternative rock
- Length: 48:42
- Label: TVPI / Self-released
- Producer: Tony Visconti

Kristeen Young chronology
X (2004)	The Orphans (2006)	Music for Strippers, Hookers, and the Odd On-Looker (2009)

The Orphans is the fifth studio album by the American rock musician Kristeen Young. Its tracks "Kill The Father" and "London Cry" were released as singles in the UK by Sanctuary/Attack.

== Track listing ==
1. "Kill The Father" – 4:09
2. "London Cry" – 4:36
3. "Mixed Kids" – 4:03
4. "(But It's All Just) Imagined" – 4:21
5. "You Ruined Everything" – 3:48
6. "Under a Landlocked Moon" – 3:43
7. "9" – 3:49
8. "Life's Not Short, It's Sooo Long" – 5:12
9. "This Is The Dawn Of My D-Day" – 3:35
10. "Dead Wrong" – 4:11
11. "Before" – 7:17

== Singles ==
- Kill The Father w/ Life's Not Short It's Sooo Long (Sanctuary/Attack Records 2006, UK)
- London Cry w/ This Is The Dawn Of My D-Day (Sanctuary/Attack Records 2006, UK)

== Musicians ==
- Kristeen Young: Vocals, keyboard
- "Baby" Jeff White: Drums
