= Meet Miss Young and Her All Boy Band =

Studio album by Kristeen Young
- Released: March 11, 1997
- Recorded: 1997
- Genre: Glam rock; indie pop; alternative rock
- Label: World Domination
- Producer: Dave Allen

Kristeen Young chronology
Meet Miss Young and Her All Boy Band (1997)	Enemy (1999)

Professional ratings
Review scores
Source	Rating
AllMusic	3/5 stars

Meet Miss Young and Her All Boy Band is the debut studio album by American rock musician Kristeen Young, released on March 11, 1997 by World Domination Recordings.

== Track listing ==
All tracks composed by Kristeen Young

1. "8" -
2. "Programme X" -
3. "Fishnet" -
4. "Marley's Ghost" -
5. "Sweetest Freedom" -
6. "Cherry" -
7. "(Don't Go) Back to School" -
8. "Yummy" -
9. "Friend or Faux" -
10. "P.E.9.14." -
11. "Corpulent and Indolent" -
12. "Now You Can Not Live" -
13. "Human Kind" -

== Personnel ==
- Kristeen Young - vocals, keyboards
- Chris Sauer - bass
- "Baby" Jeff White - drums, percussion
