= Kristeen Young =

American musician (born 1975)

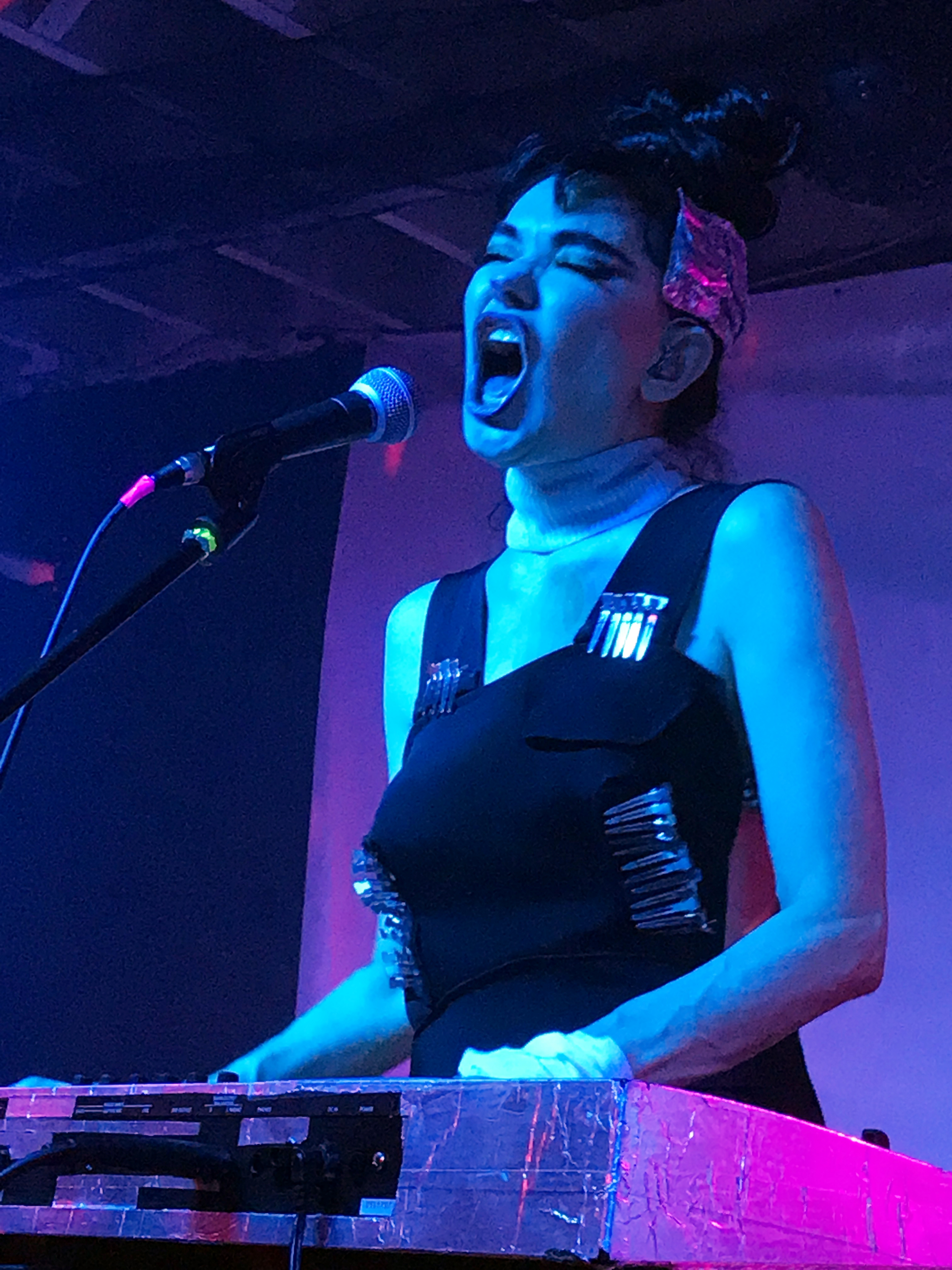
- Young performing at the Coffin Club, Portland, Oregon, in 2022

Background information
- Born: November 18, 1975 (age 50); St. Louis, Missouri, U.S.
- Genre: Alternative rock
- Occupations: Singer-songwriter; musician
- Instruments: Vocals; piano; keyboards
- Years active: 1992–present
- Labels: Zona; TVPI; N-; Sanctuary; Attack
- Website: kristeenyoung.com

Kristeen Young is an American singer-songwriter and pianist. Originally from St. Louis, Missouri, Young began playing piano as a child. She has released eleven studio albums. Young has also sung with several artists including David Bowie, Morrissey, Brian Molko of Placebo, and the Damned. She also recorded with record producer Tony Visconti, drummer Dave Grohl, and guitarist Nick Zinner.

== Career ==
In 1997, Young released her debut album, Meet Miss Young and Her All Boy Band. In the early 2000s, she began working with Tony Visconti on Breasticles, which featured a duet with David Bowie, "Saviour." On 2004's X, the opening track, "No Other God," was a duet with Brian Molko of Placebo.

Besides her own work, Young has also been featured on other artists' records. She appeared on Bowie's Heathen in 2002, and also provided the operatic vocals for Morrissey's 2008 single "That's How People Grow Up." She then sang vocals on an alternate version of "New Kid" by Monokino in 2009, and collaborated with GUIDES to perform a cover of the New Order song "Leave Me Alone" in 2015.

In May 2014, Young released her seventh album, The Knife Shift, which was recorded with Dave Grohl, who played drums and guitar.

In 2019, Young released her tenth studio album, The SubSet, which she wrote, arranged, produced, and mixed with Visconti. The album was rated 8 out of 10 by PopMatters.

== Discography ==
=== Studio albums ===
- Meet Miss Young and Her All Boy Band (1997)
- Enemy (1999)
- Breasticles (2003)
- X (2004)
- The Orphans (2006)
- Music for Strippers, Hookers, and the Odd On-Looker (2009)
- V the Volcanic (2011)
- The Knife Shift (2014)
- Live at the Witch's Tit (2017)
- The Subset (2019)
- Beauty Shop (2022)
- Full Scrotal Scorpio (2026)

=== Singles ===
- "Saviour" ft. David Bowie (Kro/Sony Masterworks 2020 — originally released on Breasticles, 2003)
- "Touch Tongues" (N- 2003, Portugal)
- "Kill the Father" (Sanctuary/Attack 2006, UK)
- "London Cry" (Sanctuary/Attack 2006, UK)
- "Pearl of a Girl" (Digital Release Only, TVPI 2014, US)

=== EP ===
- V the Volcanic (2011)
