= Breasticles =

Studio album by Kristeen Young
- Released: November 1, 2003
- Recorded: 2002
- Studio: Looking Glass (New York City)
- Genre: Glam rock; indie pop; alternative rock
- Label: Zona; N_
- Producer: Tony Visconti

Kristeen Young chronology
Enemy (1999)	Breasticles (2003)	X (2004)

Breasticles is the third studio album by American rock musician Kristeen Young, released on November 1, 2003.

== Track listing ==
All tracks composed by Kristeen Young

1. "We Want More!?" -
2. "Touch Tongues" -
3. "Bite Down" -
4. "We Are The World (Why KY)" -
5. "Wake the Dead" -
6. "21st Century Ride" -
7. "Rock Radio" -
8. "Valuable" -
9. "Automatic Love" -
10. "Breasticles" -
11. "Incubator" -
12. "Saviour" -
13. "Flash" -
14. "Buddy Boy" -

== Personnel ==
=== The Band ===
- Kristeen Young - vocals, piano, keyboards; guitar on "Flash"
- Tony Visconti - bass, guitar
- "Baby" Jeff White - drums

with:

- Richard Fortus - guitar on "Touch Tongues" and "Saviour"
- Brian Ion - bass noise on "We Are The World (Why KY)"
- Oliver Hofer - bass on "Rock Radio" and "Flash"
- Gregg Carey - drums on "Rock Radio" and "Flash"
- David Bowie - vocals on "Saviour"
- David Matos - guitar on "Flash"
- Mario J. McNulty - engineer; drums on "21st Century Ride"
