= No Plan (EP) =

2017 EP by David Bowie

EP by David Bowie
- Released: 8 January 2017
- Recorded: January–May 2015
- Length: 17:59
- Label: Columbia; Sony
- Producer: David Bowie; Tony Visconti

David Bowie chronology
Legacy (2016)	No Plan (2017)	Live Nassau Coliseum '76 (2017)

David Bowie EP chronology
Live EP (Live at Fashion Rocks) (2005)	No Plan (2017)	Is It Any Wonder? (2020)

Alternative cover
- Digital release cover

Singles from No Plan
- 1. "No Plan" Released: 7 January 2017

No Plan is an extended play, comprising songs written and recorded by English musician David Bowie, released posthumously on 8 January 2017. The release coincided with what would have been Bowie's 70th birthday, almost a year after his death. No Plan compiles the original songs written for Bowie's Off-Broadway musical, Lazarus, including the titular "Lazarus", "No Plan", "Killing a Little Time", and "When I Met You". The songs were first recorded by the cast of the musical as part of its official soundtrack. The recordings featured on No Plan come from the sessions for Bowie's twenty-sixth and final studio album Blackstar, with "Lazarus" appearing as the third track on the album. Upon release, No Plan debuted at #138 on the Billboard 200, selling more than 5,000 units in its first week there. The music video for the title track was also released in accompaniment with the EP. It was directed by Tom Hingston.

No Plan is included on the box set I Can't Give Everything Away (2002–2016), which was released on 12 September 2025.

== Critical reception ==
Professional ratings
Review scores
Source	Rating
AllMusic	3/5 stars
Exclaim!	7/10
The Independent	4/5 stars

The EP received positive reviews from music critics. Exclaim! critic Calum Slingerland wrote: "One would hope the plan for Bowie going forward would be for him to avoid falling into the category of "rock icon with innumerable posthumous releases," but thankfully for listeners, the music on No Plan holds up." The Independent's Andy Gill stated: "Blackstar’s moods and musical modes are continued through these tracks, in which Thomas Jerome Newton's decline eerily reflects Bowie's own."

AllMusic senior critic Stephen Thomas Erlewine thought that the tracks on the EP "provide a bittersweet coda to Bowie's 21st century comeback", even if "these songs don't feel like a surprise". Alfred Soto of Spin stated: "Presenting listeners with two discrete but related musical adventures like ★ and No Plan, the survivors grasped that even the oblique tastes better with a dash of the obvious."

== Track listing ==
All tracks are written by David Bowie.

No Plan track listing
No.	Title	Length
1.	"Lazarus"	6:24
2.	"No Plan"	3:40
3.	"Killing a Little Time"	3:46
4.	"When I Met You"	4:09
Total length:		17:59

== Personnel ==
Personnel adapted from No Plan liner notes.

Musicians

- David Bowie – vocals, acoustic & Fender guitars
- Donny McCaslin – saxophone, flute & woodwinds
- Jason Lindner – piano, Wurlitzer organ & keyboards
- Tim Lefebvre – bass
- Mark Guiliana – drums & percussion
- Ben Monder – guitar

Production

- David Bowie – production, mixing
- Tony Visconti – production, mixing, engineering
- Tom Elmhirst – final master mix
- Joe LaPorta – mastering
- Kevin Killen – engineering
- Kabir Hermon – engineering assistance
- Erin Tonkon – engineering assistance
- Joe Visciano – assistant to Tom Elmhirst

Design

- Barnbrook – cover design
- DSS – front cover star image
- Jimmy King – Bowie image

== Charts ==
Chart (2017)	Peak position
Mexico Ingles Airplay (Billboard)	24
Portuguese Albums (AFP)	28
UK Official Charts Singles	92
US Billboard 200	131
US Top Alternative Albums (Billboard)	7
US Top Rock Albums (Billboard)	10

Year-end Chart (2017)	Position
UK Official Chart Singles (Vinyl)	1
