= Transistor Sound & Lighting Co. =

Canadian indie-rock band (1995–2000)

- Also known as: Transister Flux; The Transister Family; Transister Sound & Lights Co,…, Transister Deli Transister, Transister Sound & Lighting Co.
- Origin: Winnipeg, Manitoba, Canada
- Genres: Indie rock, pop
- Years active: 1995–2000
- Label: ViK. Recordings
- Members: Jason Churko; Marty Kinack; Dino D'Ottavio
- Past members: Marcia Fifer, Mark Sawatzky, Michael Marshall,

Transistor Sound & Lighting Co. was an indie rock band from Winnipeg, Manitoba, Canada. The group was active from 1995 to 2000. Throughout the band's lifespan, they went under different names, such as: Transister Flux, The Transister Family, Transister Deli, Transister, and Transister Sound & Lighting Co.

== History ==
The band formed in 1995, and self-released a 3-song cassette recording that year, The Transister Flux and performed local shows. The band distributed a 5-song cassette EP in 1996, called Transistor Sounds. They were signed to the Canadian arm of Sony Records, ViK. Recordings, and released a 5-song CD EP, called Transister Sound & Lighting Co., of early mixes in November 1996, a 7" vinyl single called Transister Sound & Lighting Co., featuring a different 4-track version of "Prince Vince", and two non-LP tracks, in 1996. Their debut, eponymous LP, was due to be released in 1997, but wasn't released until April 1998 The band released two music videos for the album, "Anyways/Mayonnaise", and "Prince Vince". "Anyways/Mayonnaise" was also released as a promotional-only CD single.

The band toured throughout Canada performing at festivals such as NXNE, SXSW and Halifax On Music in 1996 Canadian Music Week both in 1997, and 1998 and opening for many different bands and artists, such as Hayden,Beth Orten, By Divine Right, The Weakerthans,Duotang Treble Charger, CrackerSwervedriver, and Sianspheric.

The band received a 1998 Juno Nomination for Best Alternative album. The band and their single, “Anyways/Mayonnaise” were nominated for Best New Group in the 1999 Canadian Radio Music Awards.

During live performances in 1998, the band performed two songs that weren't released on their self-titled record, but were recorded during the album sessions; “Gone Mind”, and “Evil Song” They were hired by Emm Gryner in October 1997, to record a single version of her songs "Summerlong"/“Phonecall 45" from her major label debut Public, for a special 7” promotional-only release. “Summerlong” was later released on Gryner's 2000 release, Dead Relatives. In July 1999, Churko began working at Winnipeg's local record store, Music Trader / Into The Music. At Canadian Music Week 2000, members of the band backed Emm Gryner for her performance at The Horseshoe Tavern, in Toronto. In the course of record label reorganization, they left the label.

In December 2023, Innerservice Records in Winnipeg, released a tribute album to Transistor Sound & Lighting Co.’s eponymous sole LP, featuring many local Winnipeg bands’ takes on the songs, called A Tribute to Transistor Sound & Lighting Co., for the albums twenty-fifth anniversary.

== Alternate and unreleased songs and recording of second LP ==
During a July 2024 appearance on the Meowing Into the Abyss podcast, Jay & Dino discussed that there are many different outtakes of songs to what was eventually released on the Transistor Sound & Lighting Co. album. They stated that there are about 21 different alternate versions of "Prince Vince" that the band recorded. An unreleased acoustic version of "Sasparilla", with tambourine, also exists and is circulating amongst fans. "Three Chords" had a couple different versions recorded, notably one as a full band which featured drums. A version of "Crayola" exists without keyboards, and there may be alternate, different mixes of the song.

During the podcast, Jay & Dino also discussed that there were about nine or ten unreleased songs, recorded for a potential second album, that were 90% completed, including mixing. One of those tracks slated for the second LP, was "Gone Mind". "Gone Mind" was recorded, in 1995, in two different versions. A fast version of the song was released on The Transister Flux cassette, in 1995. The song was performed live by the band in August 1998 A slow, bass and guitar-only version of "Gone Mind" is circulating amongst collectors. Another song slated for a second LP was "Freedom Park". A studio recording exists for this song. This song was also performed live in October 1998, by the band. Another unreleased song, "Evil Song" was also performed live in August 1998. It is unknown if a studio version of this song exists or was recorded.

Within the interview, the band noted that they own 50% of their song publishing. The band sold their masters to the record label.

== Discography ==
=== LP ===
- Transistor Sound & Lighting Co. (released April 7, 1998 on BMG)

=== EPs ===
- The Transister Flux (3-song cassette, single sided, 1995)
- Transister Sound & Lighting Co. (5-song CD, EP, Nov. 1996)
- Transistor Sounds (5-song cassette EP, 1996)

=== Singles ===
- Anyways/Mayonnaise (CD Single, 1998)
- Transister Sound & Lighting Co. (7’, Translucent Purple, 1996)

=== Compilation Appearances ===
- "Prince Vince" - Tune In, Turn On, Bug Out (CD, Comp, 1996)
- "Trampoline Delay" - Tune In Turn On Bug Out! (Fall '97) (CD, Comp, 1997)
- ”Puddlecloud, Lovesong” - Life Don’t Get Any Better Than This: 1997 National Campus Community Radio Conference Sampler (CD, Promo, 1997)
- “Anyways/Mayonnaise” I’m with ViK (CD, Promo, Sampler, 1997)
- “Anyways/Mayonnaise” - BMG Pop Promo CD - Comp.#34 - February 1998 (CD, Comp)
- “Anyways/Mayonnaise (New Edit)" - BMG Pop Promo CD - Comp.#39 - April 1998 (CD, Comp)
- "Summerlong (Radio Edit)" - Radioactive Top 40 & Alternative Series #06 (September 1998) (CD, Comp, 1998)

== Band Members ==
- Jason Churko - guitar, bass, drum, keyboards, noises, vocals
- Dino D'Ottavio - guitar, bass, drums, keyboards, synths, percussion
- Marty Kinack - drums, percussion, sound effects

== Previous members ==
- Michael "Mike" Brownlee - drums and live shows (1995–1997)

== Additional live support ==
- Brad Garinger - keyboards, guitar (1998–2000)
- Alfie Catalico - drums (1996–2000),
- Marty Chapman - drums
- Michael "Mike" Marshall - drums
- Mark Sawatzky - drums
- Marcia Fifer - bass guitar (1997–2000)
- Greg Hanec - trumpet, clarinet, tapes, vocals (1998–1999)
