= Dayna Manning =

Canadian folk and pop singer-songwriter (born 1978)

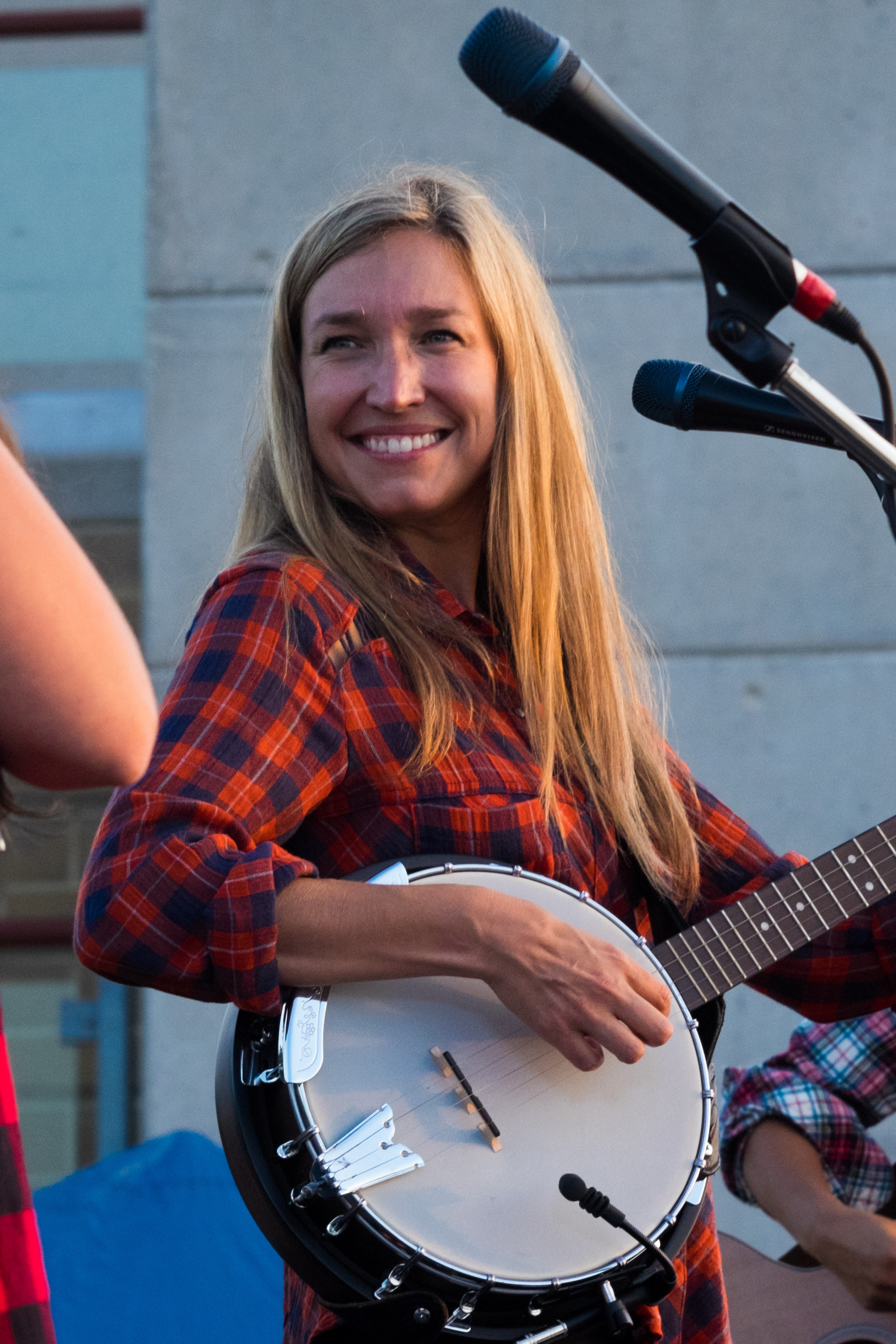
- Manning in 2014

Background information
- Born: April 27, 1978 (age 48); Stratford, Ontario, Canada
- Origin: Stratford, Ontario
- Genres: Folk; pop
- Occupations: Singer-songwriter; producer; engineer
- Instruments: Vocals; guitar; banjo; piano; bass
- Years active: 1997–present
- Labels: Formerly EMI Music Canada and Nettwerk; LeParc
- Website: www.daynamanning.com

Dayna Manning (born April 27, 1978) is a Canadian folk and pop singer-songwriter, as well as a producer and sound engineer. As a teenager she released her first album, Volume 1, on EMI and Nettwerk, with featured musicians including Sean Lennon and Melanie Doane. A single from the album reached No. 15 on the MuchMusic top hits chart in Canada, and she was nominated for the 1998 Juno Award for Best New Artist.

She performed at the first Lilith Fair, and her second album, Shades, was released in 2002 to positive reviews. After releasing her third album Folkyo, Manning joined the folk trio Trent Severn in 2011, along with Emm Gryner and Laura Bates, who was later replaced by Lindsay Schindler. In 2012 they released their debut, Trent Severn, and the band was nominated for two 2013 Canadian Folk Music Awards. Trent Severn has released two follow up albums, Trillium (2015) and Portage (2017), both produced and engineered by Manning. Trillium made the Longer List for the 2016 Polaris Music Prize.

== Early life ==
Dayna Manning was born in Stratford, Ontario, Canada on April 27, 1978, to David Manning, a music teacher, and Darlene Manning. One night while babysitting, Manning found a guitar in the house and used it to write her first song, "Walk on the Moon." Years later the track was included on her debut album. According to Manning, "I always did [songwriting] completely on my own. It is very personal to me." While she has learned to play a number of instruments, early on Manning primarily focused on vocals and guitar, with her guitar of choice a handmade McConville Acoustic.

Before releasing a record and while still a teenager, Manning opened for Burton Cummings's "Up Close and Alone" tour in Canada, and she has stated that Cummings was a significant influence on how she handled herself in the industry. Set to self-produce her first album at the age of 16, she was discovered by Honeymoon Suite keyboardist Ray Coburn at a showcase at Lee's Palace in Toronto; after two live performances for EMI executives, the label signed Manning to a record deal.

== Music career ==
=== Volume 1 (1997) ===
Volume 1, her debut album, was released on April 15, 1997, by EMI Music Canada and on August 26, 1997Nettwerk in the United States. Manning and Ray Coburn produced and performed; other featured musicians included Melanie Doane, Harry Hess, Sean Lennon, and Manning's parents, Darlene and David Manning, on clarinet and trumpet respectively. Stephen Drake, of Canadian rock band Odds, mixed the album.

Her first single and video, "Half the Man," was downcast, mournful and heavily folk-inflected; nonetheless it became a strong hit on Canadian radio and MuchMusic, and the uptempo follow-up track, "My Addiction" was also successful, peaking at No. 14 on MuchMusic. She was nominated for the 1998 Juno Award for Best New Artist.

After her first release she toured Canada and North America for two years, performing on the first and second season of Lilith Fair and with Lisa Loeb, Spirit of the West, 54-40, Joe Cocker, and opening for Radiohead.

=== Shades (2002) ===
Shades, her second album with EMI, was released in late 2002. It was recorded in Los Angeles at Cello Studios with Red Hot Chili Peppers engineer Jim Scott, and with additional production by Dave Hodge. Some of the musicians who played on the album included Chad Smith of the Red Hot Chili Peppers, session musician Bob Glaub, Neal Casal, John Ginty, Don Heffington, and Greg Leisz.

The album was criticized in some reviews for a production-heavy sound that took away from Manning's own voice and potential. Other reviews were more favorable, praising the album's aural ambience and Manning's talent for introspective lyrics. The song "Miracle" was released as a single and video.

=== Compilations ===
Manning's tracks have been included on a number of compilations. Her live track "I Want," recorded at the original Lilith Fair in Vancouver in 1997, was included on two Lilith Fair compilations, one in 1998 and one in 2000. She contributed "I Know How the Moon Must Feel" to the 2000 soundtrack for the film Thomas and the Magic Railroad. Her 2002 single "Miracle" was included on the WEA International compilation Women & Songs 6, which also included tracks by artists such as Vanessa Carlton, Madonna, and Sheryl Crow. The compilation, released in December 2002, became the best-selling album in the Women & Songs franchise, and reached No. 7 on the Top Canadian Albums chart. A year later her version of "Silent Night," performed by Damhnait Doyle, was released on Women & Songs Christmas.

=== Folkyo (2006) ===
After eight years Manning parted ways with EMI. Her third album, Folkyo, was released on December 19, 2006, and saw Manning write, co-produce, engineer and perform. She released the album on her own label, LeParc Records, and even raised funds to finish production by working at a construction camp in Northern British Columbia for the Winter of 2006. Collaborators included Ian Brown from Matthew Good Band and Christian Thor-Valdson from Copyright. Folkyo received positive reviews, praising the album's musical intricacy and Manning's voice and writing, as well as its complex tones and clever lyrics.

According to a Toronto Quarterly article in 2012, "[Manning's] songwriting is sincere and superbly crafted, her finger-picking skills are unmatched and her voice is truly unmistakable with a timbre that reminds one of Roy Forbes, Joni Mitchell, and Dolly Parton all at once."

=== Trent Severn ===
In 2011, Canadian singer-songwriter Emm Gryner approached Manning about forming a folk band, and Manning's childhood friend and violinist Laura C. Bates joined soon thereafter. They named the trio Trent Severn, after Trent-Severn Waterway in Southern Ontario. All three women contribute to the songwriting and the vocals, while Manning plays banjo or guitar, and frequently reference Canadian culture and landscapes in their music. They sold out a number of their early shows, also playing on CBC Radio's Q.

They released their self-titled debut album on November 6, 2012. Manning wrote four of the songs on the album: "Road Less Traveled," "Freedom," "Mulroney Times," and "Truscott." The album received heavy airplay on CBC Radio, and reviews were generally positive. Post City praised the balanced feel between tracks, stating "For the most part, the album [has a] laid-back, twangy trend, punctuated by a couple of fast-paced and upbeat numbers here and there. The result is a warmly nostalgic record padded with darkly pensive instrumentation."

The band was nominated for two 2013 Canadian Folk Music Awards. Manning tours frequently with Trent Severn and plays both large and small events, many informal and outdoors. In 2013, Manning arranged an original folk version of "O Canada" with three part vocal harmony, which she performed with Trent Severn at the flag raising ceremony on Parliament Hill, Ottawa on July 1, 2013.

On March 15, 2013, they became the first band to receive a phone call to a concert from space, when they played a live song for Commander Chris Hadfield while he was on the international space station. On Canada Day of that year the band was part of Hadfield's first performance back on earth, of "Space Oddity" by David Bowie.

== Discography ==
=== Solo albums ===
Year	Title	Release details
1997	Volume 1	Released: August 26, 1997; Label: EMI Music Canada / Nettwerk (US); Format: CD
2002	Shades	Released: 2002 / January 1, 2007; Label: EMI Music Canada; Format: CD, digital
2006	Folkyo	Released: October 17, 2006; Label: LeParc Records; Format: CD, digital
2019	Morning Light	Released: October 26, 2019; Label: Dayna Manning; Format: CD, digital

=== Singles ===
Year	Song title	Song details	Chart peaks	Album
Year	Song title	Song details	MM	Album
1996	"Half the Man"	Format: video		Volume 1
1997	"My Addiction"	Format: CD single, video	14	Volume 1
2002	"Miracle"	Format: CD single, video		Shades / Women & Songs 6
"—" denotes a recording that did not chart or was not released in that territory.

=== Compilations ===
- 1998: Lilith Fair: A Celebration of Women in Music – track "I Want" live from 1997
- 2000: Best of Lilith Fair 1997 To 1999 – track "I Want" live from 1997
- 2000: Thomas & the Magic Railroad: Soundtrack – track "I Know How The Moon Must Feel"
- 2000: Echoes of the Seventies (Reflections) – tracks "Lonely People," "Time in a Bottle," "Sugar Mountain"
- 2002: Women & Songs 6 WEA International) – track "Miracle"
- 2003: Women & Songs Christmas (WEA International) – track "Silent Night" with Damhnait Doyle
- 2005: Christmas Songs (Nettwerk) – track "It’s in Every One of Us"

=== With Trent Severn ===
Year	Album title	Release details	Manning's Role
2012	Trent Severn	Released: November 6, 2012; Label: Dead Daisy Records; Format: CD, digital	Songwriter, co-Producer, engineer, Guitar, Vocals, Banjo, Percussion
2015	Trillium	Released: October 9, 2015; Label: Trent Severn; Format: CD, digital	Songwriter, producer, engineer, Guitar, Vocals, Banjo, Percussion
2017	Portage	Released: June 30, 2017; Label: Trent Severn; Format: CD, digital	Songwriter, producer, engineer, Guitar, Vocals, Banjo, Percussion

== See also ==
- Juno Awards of 1998: Best New Solo Artist nominations

== Awards and nominations ==
Juno Award - Best New Solo Artist Nomination 1998 for album "Volume 1"

Canadian Folk Music Awards - Producer of the Year Nomination 2021 "Morning Light"
