= Conversation Piece (disambiguation) =

A conversation piece is an informal group portrait, in painting.

Conversation Piece may also refer to:

- Conversation Piece (musical), by Noël Coward (1934)
- "Conversation Piece" (song), by David Bowie (1970)
- Conversation Piece (box set), by David Bowie (2019)
- Conversation Piece (film), by Luchino Visconti (1974)
- Conversation Piece, an album by the post-hardcore band A Lot Like Birds (2011)
