= Something Happens =

Irish pop-rock band

- Something Happens

Background information
- Origin: Dublin, Ireland
- Genres: Rock; pop rock
- Years active: Mid 1980s – late 1990s 2000 – present (intermittent)
- Labels: Virgin Records; Charisma Records (US)
- Members: Tom Dunne; Ray Harman; Alan Byrne; Eamonn Ryan

Something Happens is an Irish pop rock band. Its membership comprises vocalist Tom Dunne, guitarist Ray Harman, bassist Alan Byrne, and drummer Eamonn Ryan. Most active between 1988 and 1995, the members remain close friends as of 2020 and play occasional reunion shows.

The Dublin-based band first rose to prominence when their single "Burn Clear" was featured on the soundtrack of the 1988 British-Irish film The Courier.

== Career ==
=== Recording activity: 1988-1995 ===
An earlier incarnation of the band was known as 'The Dazzmen,' fronted by singer Martin Lynch. After Lynch departed to front another early 1980s Dublin band, The Cracker Factory, the band recruited Dunne and rebranded as Something Happens.

Something Happens' first release was the self-released "Two Chances" EP, which attracted the attention of Virgin Records. After initially declining the label, the band agreed to a second proposal and released a live EP, I Know Ray Harman, in 1988.

Their debut album Been There, Seen That, Done That was, released on Virgin Records later in the year. One of the singles from this album, "Forget Georgia," was later covered by Canadian singer Emm Gryner on her 2005 album Songs of Love and Death. In August 1989, the band attracted further attention from supporting Simple Minds at a show performed in Dublin.

Something Happens' second album, Stuck Together With God’s Glue, was recorded in Los Angeles and released in 1990 to critical acclaim, with the song "Petrol" featuring in NME's top fifty singles of the year. Despite achieving some success in Ireland and the United Kingdom, international recognition eluded the band; they were ultimately dropped by Virgin shortly after their second album's release. The band subsequently produced t-shirts bearing the slogan, "Something Happens are no longer Virgins."

The band released its third album, Bedlam-A-Go-Go on Charisma Records in 1992. When this label folded, their final album, Planet Fabulous (1994), was released on the Wild Bikini label. A song from this album ("Momentary Thing") appeared on the original television soundtrack for Veronica Mars, released in 2005 by Nettwerk Records.

The band released a greatest hits album, The Beatings Will Continue Until Morale Improves, the following year, which was re-released in 2004 under the title, The Best of Something Happens. A repackaged edition of Planet Fabulous, entitled Alan, Elvis & God, was released in 1997 with the addition of five previously unreleased tracks.

=== Subsequent activity: 1995-present ===
Since 1995, the band has played occasional gigs, but no longer records new material. The band plays at Whelan's in Dublin twice a year, once at Christmas and a second time during the early summer. They also make appearances at various other festivals around the country, including the "Bulmers Live at Leopardstown" event in 2019. The band supported Horslips as part of their comeback show in 2009. The band has appeared on RTÉ's The Late Late Show on a number of occasions since the 1990s, including a reunion to celebrate their 30th anniversary in 2014 and an acclaimed performance in 2020.

== Discography ==
- Been There, Seen That, Done That (1988)
- I Know Ray Harman (1988) - live album recorded at McGonagles in Dublin
- Stuck Together With God's Glue (1990)
- Live at the Town & Country
- Bedlam A Go-Go (1992)
- Planet Fabulous (1994)
- The Beatings Will Continue Until Morale Improves (1995)
- Alan, Elvis & God (1997)
