= Trent Severn =

Canadian musical group

- Origin: Stratford, Ontario
- Genre: Folk music
- Years active: 2011–2019
- Label: Trent Severn
- Members: Emm Gryner; Dayna Manning; Lindsay Schindler
- Past members: Laura C. Bates
- Website: TrentSevernBand.ca

Trent Severn was a Canadian folk trio composed of Emm Gryner, Dayna Manning, and Lindsay Schindler. Founded in 2011, all of its members shared vocal duties and contributed to the songwriting process. They released their self-titled debut album in November 2012, under the imprint Dead Daisy Records. The band was nominated for two 2013 Canadian Folk Music Awards, and toured and performed around Canada until announcing a hiatus on January 21, 2019.

== History ==
=== Founding ===
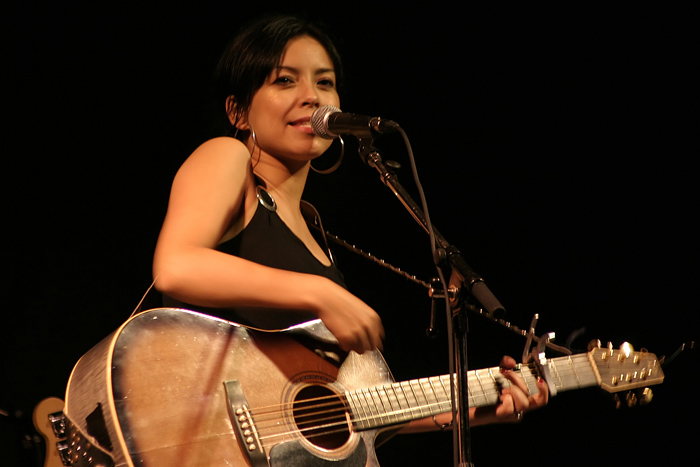
Band member Emm Gryner (pictured in 2005), contributed vocals and bass

In 2011 Emm Gryner approached fellow Canadian singer-songwriter Dayna Manning about forming a folk band, and Manning's childhood friend and violinist Laura C. Bates joined soon thereafter. Gryner and Manning had co-billed a number of stages early in their careers, and had both been raised in Ontario.

They named the trio Trent Severn, after the Trent-Severn Waterway in Southern Ontario. All three women contribute to the songwriting and the vocals, and frequently reference Canadian culture and landscapes in their music. They also typically do all instrumentals themselves, with Manning on banjo or guitar, Gryner with a bass and stomp box, and Bates with a fiddle/violin and sometimes percussion. They sold out a number of their early shows, also playing on CBC Radio's Q.

=== Debut ===
They released their self-titled 10-track debut album on November 6, 2012, under the imprint Dead Daisy Records. Excluding a guest appearance by Joel Plaskett on the track "Bluenose on a Dime" and percussion by Dave Tolley, all the music is arranged and performed by the band. The writing, recording, and mixing process overall had taken fourteen months.

The album received heavy airplay on CBC Radio, and reviews were generally positive. According to one reviewer, the album "contains a distinctly folk feel reminiscent of Joni Mitchell or Gordon Lightfoot." Post City praised the balanced feel between tracks, stating "For the most part, the album [has a] laid-back, twangy trend, punctuated by a couple of fast-paced and upbeat numbers here and there. The result is a warmly nostalgic record padded with darkly pensive instrumentation...Trent Severn sing and play with the weight carried by old souls, but they can still throw in a wink with playful verses and jaunty songs."

=== Touring ===
The band was nominated for two 2013 Canadian Folk Music Awards. Trent Severn tours frequently and plays both large and small events, many informal and outdoors. In 2013 Manning arranged an original folk version of "O Canada" with three part vocal harmony, which Trent Severn performed at the flag raising ceremony on Parliament Hill, Ottawa on July 1, 2013.

The band had an ongoing campaign to have people send postcards from across Canada. On March 15, 2013, they became the first band to receive a phone call to a concert from space, when they played a live song for Commander Chris Hadfield while he was on the International Space Station. On Canada Day of that year the band was part of Hadfield's first performance back on Earth, of "Space Oddity" by David Bowie.

== Members ==
- Emm Gryner – vocals, guitar, bass, stomp box (2011–2019)
- Dayna Manning – vocals, guitar, banjo floor percussion (2011–2019)
- Lindsay Schindler – vocals, violin, fiddle, (2015–2019)
- Laura C. Bates – vocals, violin, fiddle, floor percussion (2011–2015)

== Discography ==
=== Albums ===
| Year | Album title | Release details |
|---|---|---|
| 2012 | Trent Severn | Released: November 6, 2012; Label: Dead Daisy Records; Format: Digital |
| 2015 | Trillium | Released: October 9, 2015; Label: Trent Severn; Format: Digital |
| 2017 | Portage | Released: June 30, 2017; Label: Trent Severn; Format: Digital |

=== Singles ===
Incomplete list of songs by Trent Severn
| Year | Title | Album | Certifications |
|---|---|---|---|
| 2012 | "Truscott" | Trent Severn | |
| 2014 | "Love and Maple Syrup" by Gordon Lightfoot | Single only | |

== Awards and nominations ==
List of awards and nominations for Trent Severn
| Year | Contest | Category | Result |
|---|---|---|---|
| 2013 | 9th Canadian; Folk Music Awards | "Vocal Group of the Year" | Nominated |
| 2013 | 9th Canadian; Folk Music Awards | "New/Emerging Artist of the Year" | Nominated |
| 2016 | Polaris Music Prize | "Longer List" | |
