= Science fair (disambiguation) =

A science fair is a competitive event hosted at schools.

Science fair or variations of the term may refer to:

- Science Fair (film), a 2018 National Geographic documentary film
- Science Fair (album), a 1999 album by Emm Gryner
- Science Fair (novel), a 2008 novel by Dave Barry and Ridley Pearson
- "Science Fair" (Parker Lewis Can't Lose), a 1990 television episode
- "Science Fair", a song by Black Country, New Road from the 2021 album For the First Time

== See also ==
- Science festival
