= Unravelled Broken Orchestra =

Unravelled Broken Orchestra was an avant garde ensemble based in Winnipeg, Manitoba, Canada. With a core of regular players (Christopher Friesen, Terence Fuller, Jaret McNabb, Fletcher Pratt, Robert Turnbull) and an open-door policy to others, they create soundscapes that were equally inspired by Miles Davis and Sonic Youth. Their debut cd Centre of the Universe in Reverse was independently released late 2005.

In 2009, they changed their name to Broken Orchestra of Winnipeg. In 2012, Friesen and McNabb changed their name to Seafreezing and digitally released the album This is Not a Guarantee, It's a Possibility. They continued to post songs to 2017.

== Discography ==
- Death Fog, 2005.
- Gone / The Unravelled Broken Orchestra (split with Gone), 2005.

== Ensemble members ==
- Joshua Ayers - drums (also Filament, Funk Dubois, Pope's Daughter).
- Corey Biluk - drums (also The Paperbacks)
- Darcy Bunio - guitar (also Head Hits Concrete).
- Alexander Campbell - didgeridoo (also Funk Dubois).
- Kevin Chubey - spoken word.
- Robert Dickson - electronics (also Nagasaki).
- Breanna Duffill - percussion.
- Brendon Ehinger - keyboard.
- Dave Forte - percussion (also Absent Sound).
- Christopher Friesen - bass, keyboard, percussion, drums, vocals, saxophone, balloon.
- Terence Fuller - bass, drum machine, found percussion, balloon, 4-track (also Gone).
- Eric Gallipo - guitar, keyboard, trumpet.
- Doreen Girard - cello.
- Joshua Granowski - stand-up bass.
- Chris Hepola - drums.
- Luke Heiken - guitar, gadgets, keyboards, bass, drum
- D'alton Hindle - guitar, trombone, gadgets.
- Cameron Johnson - gadgets, found percussion, sampler, mixer, balloon (also This Camera is Red).
- Sam Koulack - drums, guitar, found percussion, balloon.
- Ian La Rue - guitar. Also performs with Ian La Rue & The Condor, Heartbeat City.
- Daniel Layman - electronics (also Nagasaki).
- Kris Manikum - electronics.
- Steve Martens - drums (also The Idjits).
- Kevin Mclean - keyboards, trombone (also The Paperbacks).
- Jaret McNabb - bass, guitar, keyboard, balloon, recording (also The Paperbacks).
- Robert Menard - drums (also Absent Sound).
- Stephane Oystryk - guitar, balloon (also ...and then nothing).
- Fletcher Pratt - guitar, microphone, gadgets, balloon, recording.
- Robert Ross - saxophone.
- Sarah Sangster - guitar (also The Paperbacks, Anthem Red).
- Tyler Shipley - banjo, spoken word (also The Consumer Goods).
- David Sweatman - percussion (also Sortie Real).
- Robert Turnbull - guitar (also Funk Dubois, Pope's Daughter).
