= Planet Fabulous =

Studio album by Something Happens
- Released: 1994
- Recorded: Ropewalk Studios, Dublin
- Genre: Rock
- Label: BMG, RCA
- Producer: Chris O’Brien and Something Happens

Something Happens chronology
Bedlam A Go-Go (1992)	Planet Fabulous (1994)	Alan, Elvis & God (1997)

Singles from Planet Fabulous
- 1. "Are You My Girl"; 2. "Rosewood"; 3. "Planet Fabulous"

Planet Fabulous was released in 1994 and was Something Happens' fourth studio album after the success of Stuck Together with God's Glue. Singles included "Flag," "Rosewood," and "Planet Fabulous."

== Track listing ==
1. "Flag" – 4:16
2. "Are You My Girl" - 3:13
3. "Fataler Femmes" - 3:31
4. "Here Come the Soldiers" - 2:27
5. "Rosewood" - 2:50
6. "Winds Future Wife" - 2:02
7. "Heart of a Driver" - 2:57
8. "A 70's Wedding" - 3.28
9. "c.c Incidentally" - 3:10
10. "Xuxa" - 1:46
11. "Planet Fabulous" - 2:53
12. "God Awful Complications" - 2:44
13. "Divide" - 2:11
14. "Momentary Thing" - 4:01
