= The 'Mercury' Demos =

2019 box set by David Bowie

Box set by David Bowie
- Released: 28 June 2019
- Recorded: February – early April 1969
- Studios: Bowie's Apartment, Clareville Grove, Kensington, London
- Length: 41:50
- Label: Parlophone

David Bowie chronology
| Clareville Grove Demos (2019) | The 'Mercury' Demos (2019) | Conversation Piece (2019) |

The 'Mercury' Demos is a box set by English musician David Bowie, released as a vinyl album in May 2019. It features ten songs in mono, demo form performed by Bowie with his friend John Hutchinson in early 1969. In November 2019, the compilation was released on CD as part of the Conversation Piece box set.

Professional ratings
Review scores
| Source | Rating |
|---|---|
| Pitchfork | 7.1/10 |

== Background ==
Like the box sets Spying Through a Keyhole and Clareville Grove Demos, the LP was released to coincide with the 50th anniversary of Bowie's 1969 album David Bowie. The "Space Oddity" demo had already been released in an edited form as the first track of the 1989 box set Sound + Vision.

The box sets liner notes suggest that the tapes were recorded at David's apartment at Clareville Grove, South Kensington, sometime between the first studio attempt at "Space Oddity" on February 2, 1969, and David's move to Beckham in mid-April.

== Track listing ==
All tracks are written by David Bowie, except where noted.

| No. | Title | Writer(s) | Length |
|---|---|---|---|
| 1. | "Space Oddity" | | 5:29 |
| 2. | "Janine" | | 3:54 |
| 3. | "An Occasional Dream" | | 3:19 |
| 4. | "Conversation Piece" | | 3:31 |
| 5. | "Ching-a-Ling" | | 3:37 |
| 6. | "I'm Not Quite" (later titled "Letter to Hermione") | | 4:01 |
| 7. | "Lover to the Dawn" | | 5:02 |
| 8. | "Love Song" | Lesley Duncan | 4:09 |
| 9. | "When I'm Five" | | 3:20 |
| 10. | "Life Is a Circus" | Roger Bunn | 5:28 |
