= Songs of Love and Death (Emm Gryner album) =

Studio album by Emm Gryner
- Released: 2005
- Genre: Pop
- Label: Dead Daisy Records
- Producer: Emm Gryner

Emm Gryner chronology
Asianblue (2005)	Songs of Love and Death (2005)	The Great Lakes (2006)

Songs of Love and Death is the eighth full-length album by Canadian singer-songwriter Emm Gryner, released in 2005 on her independent label Dead Daisy Records.

Songs of Love and Death is Gryner's second album of cover versions, following 2001's Girl Versions. On this album, the unifying theme is that Gryner is covering songs by Irish songwriters.

== Track listing ==
1. "Forget Georgia" (Something Happens)
2. "Running Back" (Thin Lizzy)
3. "Deckchairs and Cigarettes" (The Thrills)
4. "Breathless" (The Corrs)
5. "Dearg Doom" (Horslips)
6. "Shining Light" (Ash)
7. "Nothing Rhymed" (Gilbert O'Sullivan)
8. "Bau-Dachong" (The Virgin Prunes)
9. "Julie Ocean" (The Undertones)
10. "Nowhere" (Therapy?)
11. "The Moorlough Shore" (traditional)
