= Been There, Seen That, Done That =

Studio album by Something Happens
- Released: 1988
- Studio: Windmill Lane (Dublin), Unique (New York City), EMI Studio J (Sydney), Jackson Music (Rickmansworth)
- Genre: Pop rock, alternative rock
- Length: 38:12
- Label: Virgin
- Producer: Tom Erdelyi, Vic Maile

Something Happens chronology
Been There, Seen That, Done That (1988)	Stuck Together With God's Glue (1990)

Been There, Seen That, Done That is the debut album by the Irish band Something Happens, released in 1988. At the time of its release the band had built up a large fan-base both in Ireland and abroad.

== Track listing ==
- All songs written and arranged by Something Happens. Copyright Virgin Music Publishers Ltd.
1. "Beach" - 3:28
2. "Incoming" - 2:43
3. "Take This with You" - 3:28
4. "Forget Georgia" - 3:44
5. "The Way I Feel" - 3:23
6. "Both Men Crying" - 2:20
7. "Burn Clear" - 3:18
8. "Give It Away" - 3:24
9. "Tall Girls Club" - 3:30
10. "Shoulder High" - 2:41
11. "Here Comes the Only One Again" - 3:06
12. "Be My Love" - 3:07

== Personnel ==
Something Happens

- Tom Dunne - vocals
- Ray Harmon - guitars, backing vocals
- Alan Byrne - bass, acoustic guitars
- Eamonn Ryan - drums, backing vocals

Additional personnel

- Don Knox - viola, mandolin
- John Ryan - keyboards, piano
- Sean Garvey - accordion

Production

- Produced and recorded by Tom Erdelyi, except "Incoming" and "Tall Girls' Club"; produced and recorded by Vic Maile
- Assistant recording engineers: John Grimes (Windmill Lane), Richard Joseph (Unique Studios), Colin Simpkins (EMI Studio J)
- Mixed by Steven Chase, except "Burn Clear" and "Here Comes the Only One Again"; mixed by Tom Erdelyi
