= Folkyo =

Studio album by Dayna Manning
- Released: December 19, 2006
- Recorded: 2005–2006
- Genre: folk, singer-songwriter
- Label: LeParc Records
- Producer: Dayna Manning, Ashton Price, Siegfried Meier

Dayna Manning chronology
Shades (2002)	Folkyo (2006)	Morning Light (2019)

Folkyo is the third studio album by Canadian singer-songwriter Dayna Manning, released on her own LeParc Records on December 19, 2006. Folkyo received positive reviews, praising the album's musical intricacy and Manning's voice and writing, as well as its complex tones and clever lyrics.

== Overview ==
=== Production ===
After eight years Manning parted ways with EMI. Her third album, Folkyo, was released on December 19, 2006, and saw Manning write, co-produce, engineer and perform. She released the album on her own label, LeParc Records, and even raised funds to finish production by working at a construction camp in Northern British Columbia for the Winter of 2006. Collaborators included Ian Brown from Matthew Good Band and Christian Thor-Valdson from Copyright.

=== Reception ===
Folkyo received positive reviews, praising the album's musical intricacy and Manning's voice and writing, as well as its complex tones and clever lyrics.

According to a Toronto Quarterly article in 2012, "[Manning's] songwriting is sincere and superbly crafted, her finger-picking skills are unmatched and her voice is truly unmistakable with a timbre that reminds one of Roy Forbes, Joni Mitchell and Dolly Parton all at once."

No.	Title	Length
1.	"I Always Want to Be With You"	3:48
2.	"Gloria"	3:59
3.	"In the Meantime"	3:48
4.	"Better Than"	2:55
5.	"If Your Mind Changes"	3:29
6.	"What's So Great About Her?"	3:17
7.	"Pale Moon"	5:24
8.	"Tears"	3:36
9.	"Peek Thru"	4:01
10.	"Anytown"	3:56
11.	"Robot Eyes"	5:01
12.	"I'll Go"	4:36

== Personnel ==
- Dayna Manning – write, co-produce, engineer and perform
- Gavin Bradley – Engineer, Keyboards, Piano, producer, Programming
- Ashton Price – Engineer, Guitar, producer
- Siegfried Meier – Producer, engineer, mastering, mixing
