= The Original Leap Year =

Studio album by Emm Gryner
- Released: 1997
- Genre: Pop
- Label: Dead Daisy Records
- Producer: Emm Gryner

Emm Gryner chronology
And Distrust It (1995)	The Original Leap Year (1997)	Public (1998)

Professional ratings
Review scores
Source	Rating
AllMusic	4/5 stars

The Original Leap Year is the second album by Emm Gryner, released on Gryner's independent Dead Daisy Records.

Gryner funded the album with prize money from Standard Broadcasting's National Songwriting Competition. The album, which was credited as a thematic song cycle inspired by the zodiac, attracted significant media attention in Canada, and Gryner was offered a major label deal with Mercury Records. She rerecorded some of the same songs for her 1998 major label debut Public, although that album also included several newer songs.

== Critical reception ==
AllMusic wrote: "Simple in its approach and running the gamut from raw power to quiet simplicity, The Original Leap Year proves its beauty without the makeup of a major studio effort."

== Track listing ==
1. "Hello Aquarius"
2. "This Mad"
3. "The End"
4. "Your Sort of Human Being"
5. "Fetching Decay"
6. "Hook Machine"
7. "Wisdom Bus"
8. "89 Days of Alcatraz"
9. "Headline Girl"
10. "July"
11. "Big Day"
12. "Doomsday"
