= Jason Churko =

Canadian musician

Jason Churko is a Canadian musician centered in Winnipeg, Manitoba, Canada. He is the guitarist and singer–sometimes the sole member–of the band Chords of Canada. Churko was the former frontman for Transistor Sound & Lighting Co. and is a former member of The Paperbacks. He has made guest appearances as a guitarist on the song "Gasoline" from the album Jimson Weed by Nathan, and with Winnipeg group Boats.
