= The Summer of High Hopes =

Studio album by Emm Gryner
- Released: May 12, 2006 (Ireland); September 26, 2006 (North America)
- Genre: Pop
- Label: Dead Daisy Records
- Producer: Nathan Larson

Emm Gryner chronology
The Great Lakes (2005)	The Summer of High Hopes (2006)	Goddess (2007)

The Summer of High Hopes is the tenth album by Emm Gryner, released in 2006 on Dead Daisy Records.

In an interview with Q Magazine, Bono cited Gryner's "Almighty Love" as one of the songs he most wished he had written himself.

Copies preordered through Gryner's website were shipped with a bonus disc, PVT, which featured rerecorded versions of songs from her 1998 album Public. This disc was later offered as a separate purchase.

== Track listing ==
1. "Girls are Murder" – 4:23
2. "Merlot" – 3:30
3. "All-Time Low" – 2:56
4. "Almighty Love" – 3:53
5. "Blackwinged Bird" – 4:21
6. "Black-Eyed Blue Sky" – 2:22
7. "Queen of the Boys" – 3:33
8. "Starcrossed" – 3:56
9. "See the Sea" – 2:26
10. "Sunshine" – 3:18
11. "Sweet Destroyer" – 4:58
