= Conversation Piece (box set) =

Box set by David Bowie
- Released: 15 November 2019
- Recorded: January 1968 – October 1969
- Length: 4:57:41
- Label: Parlophone

David Bowie chronology
The 'Mercury' Demos (2019)	Conversation Piece (2019)	Is It Any Wonder? (2020)

Professional ratings
Review scores
Source	Rating
AllMusic	3/5 stars

Conversation Piece is a box set by English musician David Bowie, released in November 2019, which contains five CDs featuring recordings made in 1968–1969. The box set includes home demos and BBC sessions, as well as two mixes of the 1969 album Space Oddity: the original 1969 stereo mix, and a new 2019 mix produced by Tony Visconti specifically for the set. The release of the 1969 mix is a repressing of the 2009 remastered CD, which was chosen due to its being mastered to match the original LP release, a priority that was not taken for Parlophone's in-house remaster created for the Five Years (1969–1973) box set in 2015.

Most of the demo tracks had been released earlier in 2019 in the vinyl box sets Spying Through a Keyhole, Clareville Grove Demos, and The 'Mercury' Demos. The 2019 mix of Space Oddity was also given a standalone release on CD and LP and on digital download and streaming services, concurrently with the box set.

== Recording dates ==
The first 11 tracks were likely recorded between January and March 1968, the same time "In The Heat of The Morning" and "London Bye, Ta-Ta" were recorded professionally. Tracks 12 and 13 were also likely recorded in November 1968, shortly after the writing of the song "Space Oddity". Track 14 was recorded sometime between November 1968 and tracks 15 to 23, recorded in January 1969.

The Mercury Demos CD was recorded sometime between the first studio attempt at Space Oddity on 2 February 1969, and David's move to Beckenham in mid April.

Tracks 1–2 of the third disc were recorded between the 12 March and the 18 April 1968 at Decca Studios, with tracks 3–7 being recorded on 13 May at BBC Radio Studios. Following this is "Ching A Ling", track 8, which was recorded in two sessions between 24 October and 27 November 1968. Track 9 was recorded 2 February 1969, at Morgan Studios. Track 10 was recorded 20 June 1969, with Track 11 likely being recorded around the same time, and Track 12 being from around July – September. Track 14–16 were recorded 20 October.

== Track listing ==
All tracks are written by David Bowie, except where noted.

Disc one – Home Demos
No.	Title	Previous release	Length
1.	"April's Tooth of Gold"	previously unreleased	2:29
2.	"The Reverend Raymond Brown (Attends the Garden Fête on Thatchwick Green)"	previously unreleased	2:15
3.	"When I'm Five"	previously unreleased	3:18
4.	"Mother Grey"	Spying Through a Keyhole	3:00
5.	"In the Heat of the Morning"	Spying Through a Keyhole	2:59
6.	"Goodbye 3d (Threepenny) Joe"	Spying Through a Keyhole	3:19
7.	"Love All Around"	Spying Through a Keyhole	2:49
8.	"London Bye, Ta-Ta"	Spying Through a Keyhole	3:31
9.	"Angel Angel Grubby Face" (version 1)	Spying Through a Keyhole	2:31
10.	"Angel Angel Grubby Face" (version 2)	Spying Through a Keyhole	2:37
11.	"Animal Farm"	previously unreleased	2:21
12.	"Space Oddity" (solo demo fragment)	Spying Through a Keyhole	2:39
13.	"Space Oddity" (version 1, with John Hutchinson)	Spying Through a Keyhole	4:02
14.	"Space Oddity" (version 2, with John Hutchinson)	previously unreleased	5.00
15.	"Space Oddity" (version 3, with John Hutchinson)	Clareville Grove Demos	5:10
16.	"Lover to the Dawn" (with John Hutchinson)	Clareville Grove Demos	3:50
17.	"Ching-a-Ling" (with John Hutchinson)	Clareville Grove Demos	2:58
18.	"An Occasional Dream" (with John Hutchinson)	Clareville Grove Demos	2:49
19.	"Let Me Sleep Beside You" (with John Hutchinson)	Clareville Grove Demos	2:54
20.	"Life Is a Circus" (Roger Bunn, with John Hutchinson)	Clareville Grove Demos	4:50
21.	"Conversation Piece"	previously unreleased	3:47
22.	"Jerusalem"	previously unreleased	4:19
23.	"Hole in the Ground" (with George Underwood)	previously unreleased	3:29

Disc two – The 'Mercury' Demos
No.	Title	Writer(s)	Length
1.	"Space Oddity"		5:29
2.	"Janine"		3:54
3.	"An Occasional Dream"		3:19
4.	"Conversation Piece"		3:31
5.	"Ching-a-Ling"		3:37
6.	"I'm Not Quite" (later titled "Letter to Hermione")		4:01
7.	"Lover to the Dawn"		5:02
8.	"Love Song"	Lesley Duncan	4:09
9.	"When I'm Five"		3:20
10.	"Life Is a Circus"	Roger Bunn	5:28

Disc three – Conversation Pieces (Mono)
No.	Title	Previous release	Length
1.	"In the Heat of the Morning" (Decca mono version)	David Bowie (1967 album); 2010 bonus disc	2:51
2.	"London Bye, Ta-Ta" (Decca alternative version)	previously unreleased	2:36
3.	"In the Heat of the Morning"	Bowie at the Beeb	3:01
4.	"London Bye, Ta-Ta"	Bowie at the Beeb	2:39
5.	"Karma Man"	Bowie at the Beeb	3:07
6.	"When I'm Five"	David Bowie (1967 album); 2010 bonus disc	3:14
7.	"Silly Boy Blue"	Bowie at the Beeb	4:32
8.	"Ching-a-Ling"	David Bowie (1967 album); 2010 bonus disc	2:51
9.	"Space Oddity" (Morgan Studios version – alternative take with John ‘Hutch’ Hutchinson)	previously unreleased	4:22
10.	"Space Oddity" (U.K. single edit)	Five Years (1969–1973)	4:42
11.	"Wild Eyed Boy from Freecloud" (mono mix)	Five Years (1969–1973)	4:54
12.	"Janine" (mono mix)	Five Years (1969–1973)	3:23
13.	"Conversation Piece" (mono mix)	Five Years (1969–1973)	3:06
14.	"Let Me Sleep Beside You"	David Bowie (1967 album); 2009 bonus disc	3:20
15.	"Unwashed and Somewhat Slightly Dazed"	David Bowie (1969 album); 2009 bonus disc	4:03
16.	"Janine"	David Bowie (1969 album); 2009 bonus disc	3:03

Disc four – 1969 Stereo Mixes
No.	Title	Previous release	Length
1.	"Space Oddity"	David Bowie (1969 album)	5:14
2.	"Unwashed and Somewhat Slightly Dazed (inc. Don’t Sit Down)"	David Bowie (1969 album)	6:51
3.	"Letter to Hermione"	David Bowie (1969 album)	2:32
4.	"Cygnet Committee"	David Bowie (1969 album)	9:31
5.	"Janine"	David Bowie (1969 album)	3:21
6.	"An Occasional Dream"	David Bowie (1969 album)	2:54
7.	"Wild Eyed Boy from Freecloud"	David Bowie (1969 album)	4:46
8.	"God Knows I'm Good"	David Bowie (1969 album)	3:17
9.	"Memory of a Free Festival"	David Bowie (1969 album)	7:09
10.	"Wild Eyed Boy from Freecloud" (single B-side stereo mix)	David Bowie (1969 album); 2009 bonus disc	4:56
11.	"Letter to Hermione" (early mix)	previously unreleased	2:32
12.	"Janine" (early mix)	previously unreleased	3:23
13.	"An Occasional Dream" (early mix)	previously unreleased	2:54
14.	"Ragazzo Solo, Ragazza Sola" (full length version)	Five Years (1969–1973)	5:14

Disc five – 2019 Mixes
No.	Title	Length
1.	"Space Oddity"	5:20
2.	"Unwashed and Somewhat Slightly Dazed"	6:18
3.	"Letter to Hermione"	2:32
4.	"Cygnet Committee"	9:28
5.	"Janine"	3:21
6.	"An Occasional Dream"	2:57
7.	"Wild Eyed Boy from Freecloud"	4:50
8.	"Conversation Piece"	3:11
9.	"God Knows I'm Good"	3:16
10.	"Memory of a Free Festival"	7:14
11.	"Wild Eyed Boy from Freecloud" (single version)	4:59
12.	"Ragazzo Solo, Ragazza Sola"	5:20

== Charts ==
Chart (2019)	Peak position
Belgian Albums (Ultratop Wallonia)	127
Hungarian Albums (MAHASZ)	28
