= The Great Lakes (album) =

Studio album by Emm Gryner
- Released: 2005
- Genre: Pop
- Label: Dead Daisy Records
- Producer: Emm Gryner

Emm Gryner chronology
Songs of Love and Death (2005)	The Great Lakes (2005)	The Summer of High Hopes (2006)

The Great Lakes is an album by Emm Gryner, “written, recorded, mixed, printed, hand-stamped, stapled, embossed, cut, burned and packaged especially for you by me [Emm]”.

A creative companion to Gryner's "The Great Lakes Living Room Tour", the album was only available via pre-order directly from Dead Daisy Records, and did not appear in retail outlets. Each CD booklet is numbered in a limited sequence. Along with the disc itself, a purchaser also received a hand-written thank-you note from Gryner on her personal letterhead.

The songs on the album do not represent a musical departure from Gryner's other work, in spite of the more unusual album creation and distribution process.

== Track listing ==
1. "Crystal Falls"
2. "Case of Tornadoes"
3. "Angeltown"
4. "The Crying Rain"
5. "Billy Hang On"
6. "Fast Exit"
7. "Star/Crossed"
8. "Saturday Night in Nowhere"
9. "Ex-Boy"
10. "Win the West"
11. "Bulletstorms"
