= Glastonbury 2000 =

2018 live album by David Bowie

Live album by David Bowie
- Released: 30 November 2018
- Recorded: 25 June 2000
- Venue: Pilton, Somerset, England
- Studio: RCA Mobile
- Genre: Rock
- Length: 114:16
- Label: Parlophone
- Producer: Tony Visconti

David Bowie chronology
Loving the Alien (1983–1988) (2018)	Glastonbury 2000 (2018)	Spying Through a Keyhole (2019)

David Bowie live albums chronology
Welcome to the Blackout (Live London '78) (2018)	Glastonbury 2000 (2018)	Ouvre le Chien (Live Dallas 95) (2020)

Glastonbury 2000

Video by David Bowie
- Released: 2018
- Recorded: 2000
- Label: Parlophone

David Bowie chronology
VH1 Storytellers (2009)	Glastonbury 2000 (2018)

Glastonbury 2000 is a live album by English musician David Bowie. It was recorded during his Sunday night headline slot at the Glastonbury Festival on 25 June 2000, part of his Mini Tour. The album marks the first time the full video and audio of the performance are released, 18 years after it took place. It was shown in its entirety for the first time on BBC2 on 28 June 2020.

== Background ==
The crowd at Glastonbury that year was estimated at a quarter of a million people. Bowie asked pianist Mike Garson to "warm up the audience" before the show started on his own, like he had done before Ziggy Stardust's retirement show nearly 30 years earlier.

Glastonbury co-organiser Emily Eavis commented, "I often get asked what the best set I've seen here at Glastonbury is, and Bowie's 2000 performance is always one which I think of first. It was spellbinding; he had an absolutely enormous crowd transfixed. I think Bowie had a very deep relationship with Worthy Farm and he told some wonderful stories about his first time at the Festival in 1971, when he stayed at the farmhouse and performed at 6am as the sun was rising. And he just played the perfect headline set. It really was a very special and emotional show." Garson said that of all the times he played with Bowie on stage, the Glastonbury show was his favorite.

Emily's father Michael, the founder of the festival, first met Bowie at Glastonbury in 1971. He said: "He's one of the three greatest of all-time: Frank Sinatra, Elvis Presley and David Bowie."

== Track listing ==
All tracks are written by David Bowie, except where noted.

Disc one
No.	Title	Writer(s)	Length
1.	"Introduction (Greensleeves)" (Performed by Mike Garson)	Traditional	1:48
2.	"Wild Is the Wind"	Dimitri Tiomkin; Ned Washington	6:54
3.	"China Girl"	Bowie; Iggy Pop	4:24
4.	"Changes"		3:40
5.	"Stay"		7:12
6.	"Life on Mars?"		4:42
7.	"Absolute Beginners"		7:50
8.	"Ashes to Ashes"		5:21
9.	"Rebel Rebel"		4:12
10.	"Little Wonder"	Bowie; Reeves Gabrels; Mark Plati	3:57
11.	"Golden Years"		4:07
Total length:			54:07

Disc two
No.	Title	Writer(s)	Length
12.	"Fame"	Bowie; Carlos Alomar; John Lennon	4:25
13.	"All the Young Dudes"		3:43
14.	"The Man Who Sold the World"		3:51
15.	"Station to Station"		9:49
16.	"Starman"		4:50
17.	"Hallo Spaceboy"	Bowie; Brian Eno	5:28
18.	"Under Pressure"	Roger Taylor; Freddie Mercury; Bowie; John Deacon; Brian May	5:23
19.	"Ziggy Stardust"		3:54
20.	""Heroes""	Bowie; Eno	5:57
21.	"Let's Dance"		7:06
22.	"I'm Afraid of Americans"	Bowie; Eno	5:43
Total length:			60:09 (114:16)

== Personnel ==
- David Bowie – vocals, acoustic guitar, harmonica
- Earl Slick – lead guitar
- Mark Plati – rhythm guitar, acoustic guitar, bass guitar, backing vocals
- Gail Ann Dorsey – bass guitar, rhythm guitar, clarinet, vocals
- Sterling Campbell – drums, percussion
- Mike Garson – keyboards, piano
- Holly Palmer – percussion, vocals
- Emm Gryner – keyboard, clarinet, vocals

== Charts ==
Chart (2018)	Peak position
Austrian Albums (Ö3 Austria)	50
Belgian Albums (Ultratop Flanders)	18
Belgian Albums (Ultratop Wallonia)	30
Czech Albums (ČNS IFPI)	49
Dutch Albums (Album Top 100)	19
French Albums (SNEP)	56
German Albums (Offizielle Top 100)	31
Hungarian Albums (MAHASZ)	28
Irish Albums (IRMA)	34
Italian Albums (FIMI)	32
Portuguese Albums (AFP)	21
Scottish Albums (OCC)	23
Spanish Albums (PROMUSICAE)	46
Swedish Albums (Sverigetopplistan)	39
Swiss Albums (Schweizer Hitparade)	53
UK Albums (OCC)	25
US Top Alternative Albums (Billboard)	21
