= Clareville Grove Demos =

2019 box set by David Bowie

Box set by David Bowie
- Released: 17 May 2019
- Recorded: January 1969
- Studio: Bowie's Apartment, Clareville Grove, Kensington, London
- Length: 22:32
- Label: Parlophone

David Bowie chronology
Spying Through a Keyhole (2019)	Clareville Grove Demos (2019)	The 'Mercury' Demos (2019)

Clareville Grove Demos is a box set EP by English musician David Bowie, released posthumously in May 2019. The set includes three 7" vinyl records containing six songs performed by Bowie with his friend John Hutchinson in early 1969. All songs in the collection are presented in mono, demo form. In November, all songs were released on CD on the Conversation Piece box set.

Professional ratings
Review scores
Source	Rating
Uncut	8.0/10 stars

== Background ==
Like Spying Through a Keyhole, the box set was released to coincide with the 50th anniversary of Bowie's 1969 album David Bowie. Two of the six demos, "Space Oddity" and "An Occasional Dream", had already been released in 2009 on the 40th anniversary reissue of that album.

The material was recorded in January 1969 to promote Bowie & Hutch to potential record labels, as David had just been dropped by Deram.

== Track listing ==
All tracks are written by David Bowie, except where noted

No.	Title	Writer(s)	Length
1.	"Space Oddity"		5:12
2.	"Lover to the Dawn"		3:48
3.	"Ching-a-Ling"		2:59
4.	"An Occasional Dream"		2:49
5.	"Let Me Sleep Beside You"		2:59
6.	"Life Is a Circus"	Roger Bunn	4:45
