= Asianblue =

Studio album by Emm Gryner
- Released: 2002
- Genre: Pop, alternative rock
- Length: 39:16
- Label: Dead Daisy

Emm Gryner chronology
Girl Versions (2001)	Asianblue (2002)	Songs of Love and Death (2005)

Professional ratings
Review scores
Source	Rating
Allmusic	4/5 stars

Asianblue is the seventh album by Emm Gryner, released in 2002 on Gryner's independent Dead Daisy Records.

Asianblue was nominated for Pop Album of the Year at the 2003 Juno Awards, but lost to Avril Lavigne's Let Go.

== Track listing ==
1. "Symphonic" (3:43)
2. "Beautiful Things" (3:11)
3. "Northern Holiday" (3:28)
4. "Free" (3:25)
5. "Young Rebel" (3:30)
6. "Siamese Star" (3:35)
7. "Lonestar" (4:37)
8. "Christopher" (2:48)
9. "Divine Like You" (3:46)
10. "East Coast Angel" (3:36)
11. "Green Goodnight" (3:34)

== In Media ==
The track "Symphonic" was featured numerous times on 15/Love, a television show that ran on Canada's YTV station from 2004 to 2006.
