= Gem and I =

Album by Emm Gryner

Studio album by Emm Gryner
- Released: September 21, 2010
- Genre: Pop
- Label: Dead Daisy (Canada); Second Motion (USA)

Emm Gryner chronology
| Stray Bullets (2010) | Gem and I (2010) |

Gem and I is the twelfth studio album by Emm Gryner, released September 21, 2010 on Dead Daisy Records in Canada and Second Motion Records in the United States.

The album consists of duets with a variety of other singers, including Sara Quin of Tegan and Sara, Matt Nathanson, Joe Elliott, Sass Jordan and Mike Smith, in character as Bubbles from Trailer Park Boys. It was produced by Grammy and Juno Award winner Greg Wells.

== Track listing ==
1. "Boy with an Affliction" (with Matt Nathanson)
2. "Lose My Head" (with Royal Wood)
3. "Sunrise Sometimes" (with Sass Jordan)
4. "Top Speed" (with Sara Quin)
5. "Troublesome" (with Tom Dunne)
6. "Gold Soul of Rock and Roll" (with Joel Plaskett)
7. "Almighty Love" (with Joe Elliott)
8. "Revolution Don't Roll" (with Justin Sullivan)
9. "Get Brave" (with Mike Smith)
10. "The Death of Me" (with Nathan Larson)
