= And Distrust It =

Studio album by Emm Gryner
- Released: 1995
- Genre: pop
- Label: independent
- Producer: Emm Gryner

Emm Gryner chronology
And Distrust It (1995)	The Original Leap Year (1997)

And Distrust It is the debut album by Emm Gryner released independently in 1995.

== Track listing ==
1. "Higher"
2. "David"
3. "Strange Heaven"
4. "The Winter"
5. "Five Days"
6. "Coming To Me"
7. "Trike"
8. "Lay Back"
9. "Safety in Solitude"
