= Goddess (Emm Gryner album) =

Studio album by Emm Gryner
- Released: February 2009
- Genre: Pop
- Labels: Dead Daisy Records (Canada); Second Motion Records (USA)

Emm Gryner chronology
The Summer of High Hopes (2006)	Goddess (2009)

Goddess is the twelfth studio album by Emm Gryner, released in February 2009 on Dead Daisy Records in Canada and Second Motion Records in the United States.

== Track listing ==
1. "Let it Snow"
2. "Goddess"
3. "Young As the Night"
4. "Empty Hole"
5. "Die Evergreen"
6. "Skating Rink"
7. "Match"
8. "Killing Spree"
9. "Leftover Love"
10. "Note 2 Self"
