= Marty Kinack =

Canadian Musician

- Born: Martin Davis Kinack; Canada
- Occupations: Musician; record producer; audio engineer
- Instruments: Guitar; organ
- Years active: 1990s–present
- Label: Vik
- Formerly of: Transistor Sound & Lighting Co.; Sarah Harmer; Broken Social Scene; Laser

Martin Davis "Marty" Kinack is a Canadian record producer and audio engineer. He is most noted for his work with Broken Social Scene, Hayden, and Sarah Harmer.

== Career ==
Kinack was a member of the band Transistor Sound & Lighting Co., who released a self-titled album on Vik Recordings in 1998.

He toured with Sarah Harmer in 2001, playing guitar and organ. In 2004, working in a studio set-up in Harmer's home near Kingston, he co-produced and performed on her album All of Our Names. He was the producer of a number of releases by the band Apostle of Hustle.

Kinack began touring as an audio engineer with Broken Social Scene in 2003, and later worked as a producer for many of the band's recordings. Following this, he produced an album for the Toronto band The Beauties.

In 2015, Kinack was a member of Laser, an electropop trio with Lisa Lobsinger and Paul Pfisterer. Their debut album, Night Driver, was released in early 2016.
