= Public (album) =

Studio album by Emm Gryner
- Released: June 23, 1998
- Genre: Singer-Songwriter
- Length: 51:20
- Label: Mercury
- Producer: Warne Livesey

Emm Gryner chronology
The Original Leap Year (1997)	Public (1998)	Science Fair (1999)

Alternative cover
- 2006 re-recorded as PVT

Professional ratings
Review scores
Source	Rating
Allmusic	4/5 stars

Public is the third album (the first on a major label) by Emm Gryner, released in 1998.

The album, released on Mercury Records, was not a strong seller, and Gryner was subsequently dropped from the label after Mercury was acquired by Universal Music. She revived her own independent label, Dead Daisy Records, for her next release, Science Fair, which sold significantly more copies than Public despite its more limited distribution and marketing.

In 2006, Gryner released PVT, a limited edition album featuring rerecorded versions of songs from Public. PVT was initially released only as a bonus disc with preordered copies of Gryner's 2006 album The Summer of High Hopes. It was later offered as a separate purchase.

== Track listing ==
All songs written by Emm Gryner

1. "Hello Aquarius"
2. "Wisdom Bus"
3. "Summerlong"
4. "Death Is a New Day"
5. "Phonecall 45"
6. "Acid"
7. "The Good You Make"
8. "Your Sort of Human Being"
9. "The End"
10. "July"
11. "89 Days of Alcatraz"
12. "This Mad"

== Cover versions ==
The American indie band +/- covered the song "Summerlong" on their album Pulled Punches.
