= Stuck Together with God's Glue =

Studio album by Something Happens
- Released: 1990
- Length: 47:46
- Producer: Ed Stasium

Something Happens chronology
Been There, Seen That, Done That (1988)	Stuck Together with God's Glue (1990)

Stuck Together with God's Glue is Something Happens' second studio album. "Hello, Hello, Hello, Hello, Hello, (Petrol)" ranked No. 40 on NME's singles of the year, in 1990.

== Critical reception ==
Professional ratings
Review scores
Source	Rating
Chicago Tribune	3/4 stars
Entertainment Weekly	B+

Trouser Press wrote: "With a catchy chorus and comically awkward syntax, 'Hello, Hello, Hello, Hello, Hello, (Petrol)' is a certified shoulda-been hit; the sumptuously melancholy 'Kill the Roses' takes things in a more textured, moody direction. Good show." The Washington Post opined that the album "salutes the British pop-rock tradition with the sincerest form of flattery." The Star Tribune deemed it "a pure pop-rock treat, with occasional echoes of such successful countrymen as U2 and Hothouse Flowers as well as ABBA, Squeeze and R.E.M."

The album ranked No. 33 on The Irish Times's 2008 list of the top 40 Irish albums.

== Track listing ==
1. "What Now" – 4:16
2. "Hello Hello Hello Hello Hello (Petrol)" – 3:27
3. "Parachute" – 4:30
4. "Esmerelda" – 2:35
5. "I Had a Feeling" – 4:23
6. "Kill the Roses" – 4:33
7. "Brand New God" – 2:35
8. "Room 29" – 3:56
9. "The Patience Business" – 2:46
10. "Devil in Miss Jones" – 4:01
11. "Good Time Coming" – 3:37
12. "I Feel Good" – 5:19
13. "Skyrockets" – 1:48
