= Women & Songs =

Canadian compilation album series

Women & Songs is a series of annual Canadian compilation album releases from the 1990s and 2000s, highlighting songs by female artists. The first album, simply titled Women & Songs, was released on December 9, 1997. Several of the early releases in the series reached the top then in the Canadian album chart, and the series has been noted for building a long-term fan base.

The early albums in the series received some professional reviews for compiling songs during the era when solo women performers in rock and pop music were achieving significant success, while focusing at first on Canadian performers. The series was noted for its focus on mainstream, radio-friendly songs. Reviewers also noted that the various releases in the series had been become interchangeable. A reviewer for the ninth release in the series questioned the value of the series.

== List of Women & Songs albums ==
=== Regular series ===
- Women & Songs
- Women & Songs 2
- Women & Songs 3
- Women & Songs 4
- Women & Songs 5
- Women & Songs 6
- Women & Songs 7
- Women & Songs 8
- Women & Songs 9
- Women & Songs 10
- Women & Songs 11
- Women & Songs 12

=== Special releases ===
- Women & Songs: Beginnings
- Women & Songs: Beginnings Volume 2
- Women & Songs: 60s Girl Groups
- Women & Songs: The 80s
- Women & Songs Christmas
