= Girl Versions =

Studio album by Emm Gryner
- Released: 2001
- Recorded: 2001
- Venue: Sarnia Public Library
- Studio: Umbrella Studios
- Genre: Rock/Pop
- Label: Dead Daisy
- Producer: Chris Wardman

Emm Gryner chronology
Dead Relatives (2000)	Girl Versions (2001)	Asianblue (2002)

Girl Versions is the sixth full-length album by Canadian singer-songwriter Emm Gryner, released in 2001 on Gryner's independent Dead Daisy Records. It received a Juno Awards nomination for "Best Pop Album" in 2002.

Similarly to Tori Amos' Strange Little Girls, which was released the same year, Girl Versions presented Gryner's reinterpretations of songs written by men. Unlike Amos' album, however, Gryner did not create characters to present the songs in an ironic or political context; instead, she simply chose some of her own favourite rock, heavy metal and punk songs and interpreted them in her own more pop-oriented style.

The album was originally recorded live on March 24, 2001, in the Sarnia Public Library's theatre with cellist Alex McMaster. The tapes from the concert were allegedly lost, leading Gryner to re-record the album at Umbrella Sound in Toronto with producer Chris Wardman. The attendees from the original concert are credited in the liner notes, which also include an essay by British producer Neville Farmer.

== Track listing ==
1. "Waiting Room" (Fugazi)
2. "Crazy Train" (Ozzy Osbourne)
3. "Pour Some Sugar On Me" (Def Leppard)
4. "For What Reason" (Death Cab for Cutie)
5. "Straight to Hell" (The Clash)
6. "Song 2" (Blur)
7. "Straight to You" (Nick Cave)
8. "Big Bang Baby" (Stone Temple Pilots)
9. "Sea Song" (Robert Wyatt)
10. "The Day We Hit the Coast" (Thrush Hermit)
