= Dead Relatives =

Studio album by Emm Gryner
- Released: 2000
- Genre: pop
- Label: Dead Daisy Records

Emm Gryner chronology
Science Fair (1999)	Dead Relatives (2000)	Girl Versions (2001)

Dead Relatives is the fifth full-length album by Canadian singer-songwriter Emm Gryner, released in 2000 on her independent label Dead Daisy Records.

== Track listing ==
1. "Parting Song" (4:05)
2. "Mary Jill" (5:39)
3. "Summerlong" (3:33)
4. "Half Sorry" (3:47)
5. "A Little War" (5:03)
6. "Yellow" (5:54)
7. "Daryn Song" (3:24)
8. "Suffer" (3:52)
9. "Lonely Boy" (2:33)
10. "Atlas" (3:43)
11. "Joan" (4:33)
