= Science Fair (album) =

Studio album by Emm Gryner
- Released: 1999
- Genre: Pop
- Label: Dead Daisy Records
- Producer: Emm Gryner

Emm Gryner chronology
| Public (1998) | Science Fair (1999) | Dead Relatives (2000) |

Professional ratings
Review scores
| Source | Rating |
|---|---|
| AllMusic | 4/5 stars |
| The Gazette | 7.5/10 |

Science Fair is an album by Emm Gryner, released in 1999 on Gryner's independent label Dead Daisy Records.

Within just two months of its release, Science Fair had significantly outsold its major label predecessor, Public, despite its more limited independent label distribution and marketing budget.

== Production ==
The album was recorded by Gryner in Ontario and Los Angeles, on an 8-track recorder.

== Critical reception ==
Exclaim! wrote: "Recalling such unhip icons as Fleetwood Mac and Carole King, as well as more contemporary sounds of Sarah McLachlan, Science Fair sees Gryner on the verge of a breakthrough, in terms of developing her own voice."

AllMusic wrote that the album "has substance and succeeds in every way by relying on beautiful melodies, skillful musicianship, and the heartfelt performances of a remarkably gifted young artist."

== Track listing ==
1. "Serenade"
2. "Stereochrome"
3. "Southern Dreamer"
4. "Julia"
5. "Revenge"
6. "Good Riddance"
7. "Stardeep"
8. "Boy Races"
9. "You Do Something to Me"
10. "Disco Lights"
11. "Closure"
