= The Paperbacks =

- Origin: Winnipeg, Manitoba, Canada
- Genre: Indie
- Years active: 2000–2011
- Labels: Pshaw; Parliament of Trees
- Spinoff of: The Bonaduces
- Past members: Doug McLean; Jaret McNabb; Corey Biluk; Kevin Andrechuk; Kevin McLean; Jack Jonasson; Jason Churko; Tanya Jonasson; Ian Larue; Louis Lévesque Côté; Mike Marshall; Mike MacKenzie; Remi Lebrecque; Andrew Filyk
- Website: thepaperbacks.com

The Paperbacks were a Canadian indie rock and pop music band based in Winnipeg, Manitoba.

== History ==
The Paperbacks formed in 2000 after the disbanding of local Winnipeg punk-rock act The Bonaduces. Original members were former Bonaduces singer Doug McLean, drummer Jack Jonasson, bassist Jaret McNabb, guitarists Jason Churko and Mike Marshall, and pianist Tanya Zubert.

The Paperbacks released their debut album An Episode of Sparrows in 2003 on record label Pshaw. The album appeared on the !earshot National Top 50 chart in August that year, and was released in the UK on the New Industry label.

In January 2003, Endearing Records released Intercontinental Pop Exchange No. 1, a split with Wolf Colonel. Their track "Grey Skies" was featured on the 2004 compilation album New Music Canada, Vol. 1. By 2005, the band had toured in Europe, playing in clubs and bars.

The Paperbacks' album An Illusion Against Death, produced by John K Samson of the Weakerthans, was released July 21, 2007, in Canada on the Parliament of Trees record label. In 2009, the band performed regularly in local Winnipeg venues while also writing and recording songs.

By 2010, Jonasson, Churko and Marshall had left the band, replaced by Corey Biluk on drums, Kevin Andrechuk on guitar, and Kevin McLean on keyboards. With this lineup, in January that year they released a double album of pop music, Lit from Within. Later that year they performed in Toronto as part of the NXNE Festival.

In 2011, the band dissolved when Doug McLean exited the project.

== Band members ==
- Doug McLean - Guitar, Vocals. Also performs with "Half Mast" and "Bulls on Parade", a Rage Against the Machine cover band.
- Jaret McNabb - Bass. Also performs with Broken Orchestra of Winnipeg.
- Corey Biluk - Drums. Also performs with Broken Orchestra of Winnipeg and Safety Penguin.
- Kevin Andrechuk - Guitar.
- Kevin McLean - Keyboard. Also performs with Broken Orchestra of Winnipeg and Sub City Dwellers.

== Discography ==
- Skinny Sidewalks (2002)
- An Episode of Sparrows (2003)
- Intercontinental Pop Exchange No. 1 - split with Wolf Colonel (2003)
- An Illusion Against Death (2007)
- Lit from Within (2010)
