= Space Oddity =

1969 song by David Bowie

- Cover of the 1969 Dutch and Italian single

Single by David Bowie

from the album David Bowie
- B-side: "Wild Eyed Boy from Freecloud"
- Released: 11 July 1969
- Recorded: 20 June 1969
- Studio: Trident, London
- Genre: Psychedelic folk; folk rock; space rock
- Length: 5:15 (album version); 4:33 (UK single edit); 3:26 (US single edit)
- Label: Philips (1969 UK release); Mercury (1969 US release); RCA (1972 US reissue & 1975 UK reissue)
- Songwriter: David Bowie
- Producer: Gus Dudgeon

David Bowie singles chronology
"Love You till Tuesday" (1967)	"Space Oddity" (1969)	"The Prettiest Star" (1970)

Music video
- "Space Oddity" on YouTube

"Space Oddity" is a song by the English singer-songwriter David Bowie. It was released on 11 July 1969 by Philips and Mercury Records as a 7-inch single, then was included as the opening track of his second album, David Bowie, released in November. Produced by Gus Dudgeon, and recorded at Trident Studios in London, it is a tale about a fictional astronaut named Major Tom; its title and subject matter were partly inspired by the film 2001: A Space Odyssey (1968) and Bowie's feelings of alienation at that point in his career. Its sound departed from the music hall of his debut album to psychedelic folk inspired by the Bee Gees; it was one of the most musically complex compositions he had written up to that point.

The song was rush-released as a single to capitalise on the Apollo 11 Moon landing. It received critical praise and was used by the BBC as background music during its coverage of the event. It initially sold poorly but soon reached number five in the UK, becoming Bowie's first and only chart hit for another three years. Reissues by RCA Records became Bowie's first US hit in 1972, and his first UK number-one in 1975. He re-recorded an acoustic version in 1979. Several promotional videos were produced for the song, including a 1972 one filmed by Mick Rock. It was a mainstay during Bowie's concerts until 1990, after which it was played sporadically until 2002. Bowie revisited the Major Tom character in later singles, notably the sequel song "Ashes to Ashes" (1980).

A range of artists have covered "Space Oddity" and others have released songs that reference Major Tom. A 2013 cover by the astronaut Chris Hadfield gained widespread attention; its music video was the first filmed in space. The song has appeared in numerous films and television series, including The Secret Life of Walter Mitty (2013). In 2019, Tony Visconti remixed Bowie's original recording to mark its 50th anniversary, with a new music video directed by Tim Pope. In later decades, "Space Oddity" is considered one of Bowie's finest recordings and remains one of his most popular songs. It has appeared in numerous "best-of" lists, including the Rock and Roll Hall of Fame's 500 Songs that Shaped Rock and Roll.

== Background and writing ==
Following a string of unsuccessful singles, David Bowie released his music hall-influenced self-titled debut studio album through Deram Records in 1967. The album was a commercial failure and did little to gain Bowie notice, leading to his departure from Deram in May 1968 and becoming his last release for two years. After its commercial failure, Bowie's new manager Kenneth Pitt authorised the production of a promotional film in an attempt to introduce Bowie to a larger audience. The film, Love You till Tuesday, went unreleased until 1984; it marked the end of Pitt's mentorship of Bowie.

The publicity image of a spaceman at work is of an automaton rather than a human being ... and my Major Tom is nothing if not a human being. It came from a feeling of sadness about this aspect of the space thing, it has been dehumanized, so I wrote a song-farce about it, to try and relate science and human emotion. I suppose it's an antidote to space fever, really.

— David Bowie discussing the writing of "Space Oddity", 1969

By the end of 1968, Bowie had begun to feel alienation from his career. Knowing Love You till Tuesday did not have a guaranteed audience and would not feature any new material, Pitt asked Bowie to write something new to "demonstrate David's remarkable inventiveness". Bowie wrote "Space Oddity", a tale about a fictional astronaut named Major Tom. Its title and subject matter were influenced by Stanley Kubrick's film 2001: A Space Odyssey, which premiered in May 1968. Bowie said, "I went stoned out of my mind to see the movie and it really freaked me out, especially the trip passage". Other events in Bowie's life influenced the writing of "Space Oddity", including seeing the Apollo 8 Earthrise photograph in January 1969 and his break-up with the dancer Hermione Farthingale the following month. He later said, "It was Hermione who got me writing for and on a specific person". The biographer Marc Spitz stated Bowie's feelings of loneliness and heartache following the break-up inspired "Space Oddity".

One of the first people to hear "Space Oddity" was Calvin Mark Lee, the head of A&R at Mercury Records in London. Lee considered the song "otherworldly" and knew it was Bowie's ticket to be signed by the label. The head of Mercury, Lou Reizner, was unimpressed with Bowie's output and was unwilling to sign him. Eager to sign Bowie, Lee, without Reizner's knowledge, financed a demo session for "Space Oddity". Lee later told Spitz: "We had to do it all behind Lou's back. But it was such a good record."

== Composition ==
=== Lyrics ===
"Space Oddity" tells the story of an astronaut named Major Tom, the first of Bowie's famous characters. Major Tom is informed by Ground Control that a malfunction has occurred in his spacecraft; but the astronaut does not get the message. He remains in space "sitting in a tin can, far above the world", preparing for his lonely death. In 1969, Bowie compared Major Tom's fate to the ending of 2001: A Space Odyssey, saying: "At the end of the song Major Tom is completely emotionless and expresses no view at all about where he's at. He's fragmenting ... at the end of the song his mind is completely blown – he's everything then." The authors David Buckley and Peter Doggett comment on the unusual vocabulary in the lyrics, such as "Ground Control" rather than "Mission Control", "space ship" rather than "rocket", "engines on" rather than "ignition", and the "unmilitary combination" of rank and first name for the character.

Bowie's biographers have provided different interpretations of the lyrics. According to Doggett, the lyrics authentically reflect Bowie's mind and thoughts at the time. He writes that Bowie shone a light on the way advertisers and the media seek to own a stake in a lonely man in space while he himself is exiled from Earth. Chris O'Leary said the song is a "moonshot-year prophecy" that humans are not fit for space evolution and the sky is the limit. Similarly, James E. Perone views Major Tom acting as a "literal character" and a "metaphor" for individuals who are unaware of, or do not make an effort to learn, what the world is. In 2004, the American feminist critic Camille Paglia identified the lyrics as representing the counterculture of the 1960s, stating, "As his psychedelic astronaut, Major Tom, floats helplessly into outer space, we sense that the '60s counterculture has transmuted into a hopelessness about political reform ('Planet Earth is blue / And there's nothing I can do')".

=== Music ===
"Space Oddity" is a psychedelic folk and folk rock ballad, described by Jamie Ludwig of VICE as bridging "folk and prog into a new kind of space rock exploration." It represented Bowie's new interest in acoustic music since joining the experimental trio Feathers. Nicholas Pegg and Doggett compare the song's style, structure, lyrics and arrangement to those of the Bee Gees' 1967 single "New York Mining Disaster 1941", which has similar minor chords and chorus. Hutchinson later stated: "'Space Oddity' was a Bee Gees type song. David knew it, and he said so at the time ... the way he sang it, it's a Bee Gees thing."

"Space Oddity" is one of the most complex songs Bowie had written up to that point. He storyboarded each section, all leading into the next until completion. According to O'Leary, in a little over five minutes, the song includes "a faded-in intro, a 12-bar solo verse, a 'liftoff' sequence, a duet verse, a bridge, a two-bar acoustic guitar break, a six-bar guitar solo, a third verse, another bridge, break and solo, and a 'Day in the Life'-style outro to the fade". Bowie stated in 2002 he was "keen on ... writing in such a way that it would lead me into leading some kind of rock musical".

Although primarily in the key of C major, the song has a variety of chord changes and resonances that aid in telling the story. The intro has a pairing of F major7/E and E minor, while the first verse alternates between C major and E minor. The guitar harmonises E and B while on Stylophone, Bowie "drones" C and B. A D major chord plays on the line "God's love be with you" during the pre-liftoff countdown sequence. In the second verse, an E7 chord on the line "really made the grade" counteracts the overall key of C major. O'Leary said this change "brightens" the song. The bridge's "planet Earth is blue" has a standard folk-style descending progression; (B♭ major 9th/A minor add9/G major add9/F). According to O'Leary, the B♭ major9 chord "ratifies Major Tom's choice (or doom) to stay out in space". The acoustic-guitar break has a C–F–G–A–A note sequence with the two A notes emphasised.

== Recording ==
=== Initial demos and first studio version ===
One of the first demos of "Space Oddity", recorded in January 1969, differs greatly from the album version, including unused vocal harmonies and different lyrics. Rather than the softly spoken "lift-off", an American-accented "blast-off!" is present. "I'm floating in a most peculiar way" is replaced with "Can I please get back inside now, if I may?" The demo also includes the later-revised lines:

And I think my spaceship knows what I must do
And I think my life on Earth is nearly through
Ground Control to Major Tom,
you're off your course, direction's wrong.

The demo's instrumentation uses only acoustic guitar and Stylophone, which were played by John Christopher 'Hutch' Hutchinson and Bowie, respectively. Bowie had used the Stylophone, a recently released electronic instrument that was mainly marketed to children, to compose the song's melody. Both Bowie and Hutchinson sang vocals.

Bowie and Hutchinson recorded further acoustic demos of "Space Oddity", including a performance of the song on a promotional demo tape recorded for Mercury executives in March or April 1969.

The first full studio version of "Space Oddity", which was for Love You till Tuesday, was recorded on 2 February 1969 at Morgan Studios, London. At this point, the lyrics were finalised. The session was produced by Jonathan Weston; Bowie and Hutchinson were joined by Colin Wood on Hammond organ, Mellotron and flute; Dave Clague on bass and Tat Meager on drums. As in the early demos, Bowie and Hutchinson shared lead vocals, with Bowie voicing Major Tom's dialogue and Hutchinson singing Ground Control's lines. Bowie also played an ocarina solo. Pegg calls this version significantly inferior to the David Bowie recording.

=== Album version ===
In those days a gimmick was a big deal and people who had gimmicks were taken more seriously than those who hadn't. Bowie's was that he'd written a song about being in space at a time when the first US moonshot was about to take place. I listened to the demo and thought it was incredible. I couldn't believe that Tony didn't want to do it.

— Gus Dudgeon

In June 1969, Pitt negotiated a one-album deal, with options for a further one or two albums, with Mercury Records and its UK subsidiary Philips. Mercury executives had heard one of the "Space Oddity" demos earlier in 1969. After Beatles' producer George Martin turned down the project, Pitt hired Tony Visconti, who produced Bowie's later Deram sessions. "Space Oddity" had been selected as the lead single in advance. Visconti, however, saw it as a "novelty record" and "a gimmick to cash in on the moonshot". He declined to produce the song, passing production responsibility to Bowie's former engineer Gus Dudgeon; Visconti produced the rest of the album. On hearing Bowie's demo, Dudgeon said it was "unbelievable"; he and Bowie planned "every detail" of the recording.

Work on the album version of "Space Oddity" and its B-side, "Wild Eyed Boy from Freecloud", began at Trident Studios in London on 20 June 1969. Mercury insisted the single was released the following month, ahead of the Apollo 11 Moon landing. The guitarist Mick Wayne of the British band Junior's Eyes and the keyboardist Rick Wakeman were brought on at Visconti's suggestion, while the composer Paul Buckmaster was hired to arrange the orchestra, which consisted of eight violins, two violas, two cellos, two arco basses, two flutes and an organ. Buckmaster advised Bowie to focus on creating the overall sound rather than the narrative. Dudgeon hired the bassist Herbie Flowers and the drummer Terry Cox of the folk band Pentangle, while Bowie played acoustic guitar and Stylophone. Bowie later said he added the Stylophone at Marc Bolan's suggestion; "[Bolan] said, you like this kind of stuff, do something with it. And I put it on 'Space Oddity', so it served me well." Bowie fell ill with conjunctivitis and overdubs were completed a few days later.

Dudgeon outlined a plan for the Stylophone and Mellotron parts by scribbling notes on paper, later telling the biographer Paul Trynka: "When we hit that studio we knew exactly what we wanted – no other sound would do." At one point, Wayne thought he had finished his guitar take early so he began retuning one of the strings. Dudgeon liked the warped effect of the retuning and asked Wayne to repeat it on the next take. Wakeman recorded his part in two takes after hearing the demo once; he later said; "it was one of half a dozen occasions where it made the hair stand up on your neck and you know you're involved in something special. 'Space Oddity' was the first time it ever happened to me". Cox also felt a sense of excitement after the session finished.

The session cost £500. Dudgeon was paid £100 for his work on the two songs; in June 2002, he instigated a lawsuit against Bowie claiming he did not receive the agreed two per cent of royalties for "Space Oddity". Dudgeon intended to sue for a settlement of £1 million; the suit, however, was halted after Dudgeon's death in a car accident the following month. Dudgeon had told Buckley he felt "Space Oddity" was among the finest work of Bowie's career.

=== Mixing ===
"Space Oddity" was mixed in both mono and stereo formats, a rarity for radio singles at the time. Wakeman later said it was Bowie's idea to mix it in both formats: "To the best of my knowledge nobody released stereo singles at that time, and they pointed that out to David ... and I can remember David saying, 'That's why this one will be stereo!' And he just stood his ground ... he wasn't being awkward, but he had a vision of how things should be." The biographer Kevin Cann said stereo copies were given to the media and radio stations while mono copies were given to retailers. According to Pegg, the stereo single was sold only in specific territories, including Italy and the Netherlands; the mono single appeared in both Britain and America.

== Release and promotion ==
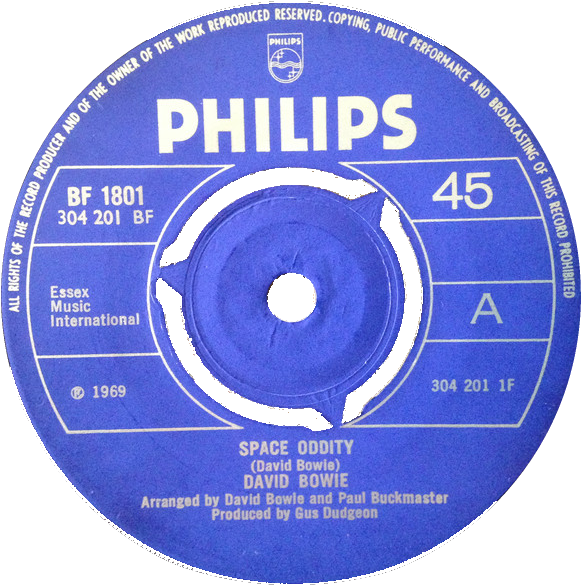
"Space Oddity" 1969 UK single

"Space Oddity" was released as a 7-inch (18 cm) single on 11 July 1969, with "Wild Eyed Boy from Freecloud" as the B-side, by Philips in the UK and Mercury in the US. In some territories, the single's sleeve included a photograph of Bowie playing an acoustic guitar, a rarity for singles at the time. The label rush-released the single to capitalise on the Apollo 11 Moon mission, which was launched five days later. According to Bowie: "It was picked up by British television and used as the background music for the landing itself in Britain ... Though I'm sure they really weren't listening to the lyric at all; it wasn't a pleasant thing to juxtapose against a moon landing. Of course, I was overjoyed that they did." Upon realising the dark lyrics, the BBC ceased playing it until the Apollo 11 crew safely returned home.

Shortly after its release, "Space Oddity" received some glowing reviews. Penny Valentine of Disc and Music Echo predicted the record was "going to knock back everyone senseless", and named "Space Oddity" the magazine's record of the year. In Melody Maker, Chris Welch wrote: "This Bee Geeian piece of music and poetry is beautifully written, sung and performed. Strangely, it could be a hit and escalate Bowie to the top." Record World said it's "a blastoff set to music, and it's haunting and eerie and right on the dot." Despite the positive reviews and Pitt's attempts at chart rigging, the single initially failed to sell. In September 1969, it debuted at number 48 on the UK Singles Chart. Mercury's publicist Ron Oberman wrote a letter to American journalists describing "Space Oddity" as "one of the greatest recordings I've ever heard. If this already controversial single gets the airplay, it's going to be a huge hit". In the US, it peaked at 124 on the Billboard Hot 100. Pitt attributed its poor performance to Oberman's use of the word "controversial" in his statement, which caused it to be banned by US radio stations.

The single's chart placement in the UK earned Bowie a number of television appearances in the latter half of 1969, starting with a performance on Dutch television show Doebidoe on 25 August 1969 (broadcast on 30 August). For his first appearance on the BBC's Top of the Pops on 2 October, Bowie was filmed in a separate studio so his image could be interspersed with NASA space footage. He played Stylophone and guitar over backing tracks prepared by Dudgeon, who was in charge of synchronising the BBC Orchestra to the backing track. Dudgeon said in 1991 that it was a "nightmare", having only been given enough time for only two takes, the second of which had a tighter orchestra but sloppy cohesion between the space footage and Bowie. The performance, broadcast on 9 October, helped "Space Oddity" reach a new chart placement of number five by early November. Bowie gave additional performances on Germany's 4-3-2-1 Musik Für Junge Leute on 22 October (broadcast on 22 November) and Switzerland's Hits A-Go-Go on 3 November. Bowie was named 1969's Best Newcomer in a readers' poll for Music Now! On 10 May 1970, Bowie performed "Space Oddity" at the Ivor Novello Awards, where he was awarded with Most Original Song.

"Ragazzo solo, ragazza sola" cover

Philips released David Bowie in the UK on 14 November 1969, with "Space Oddity" as the opening track. According to the biographer Christopher Sandford, despite the commercial success of "Space Oddity", the remainder of the album bears little resemblance to it, resulting in its commercial failure on its initial release, selling just over 5,000 copies by March 1970. In mid-December 1969, Philips requested a new version of "Space Oddity" with Italian lyrics after learning that one had already been recorded in Italy. Pitt thought the idea was "ridiculous" and said, "it was explained to us that 'Space Oddity' could not be translated into Italian in a way that the Italians could understand". The Italian version was recorded on 20 December at Morgan Studios with the accent coach and producer Claudio Fabi producing and lyrics translated by the Italian lyricist Mogol. This version, titled "Ragazzo solo, ragazza sola" (transl. "Lonely Boy, Lonely Girl"), was released as a single in Italy in 1970 and failed to chart.

Bowie did not have another hit after "Space Oddity" until the release of "Starman" in 1972. In his book The Complete David Bowie, Pegg opines that "Space Oddity" was destined to be remembered only as a novelty hit, as the year 1969 was full of similar tunes, from the Scaffold's "Lily the Pink" to Rolf Harris's "Two Little Boys". Additionally, numerous space-themed songs had already charted by 1969, including Zager and Evans's "In the Year 2525", which was a UK number one in the three weeks immediately before "Space Oddity"'s entry into the top 40. Pegg argues that only later did Bowie's song "transcend" the novelty hit to be regarded as a "genuine classic".

=== Rereleases ===
["Space Oddity" was] a very good song that possibly I wrote a bit too early because I hadn't anything else substantial [to follow it] at the time.

— David Bowie, 1983

Following the commercial breakthrough of Bowie's fifth studio album The Rise and Fall of Ziggy Stardust and the Spiders from Mars in 1972, Bowie's then-label RCA Records undertook a reissue campaign for his Mercury albums that included repackaging David Bowie with the title Space Oddity. To promote this release, RCA rereleased "Space Oddity" as a single, with "The Man Who Sold the World" as the B-side, on 13 December 1972 in North America only. The single reached number 15 on the US Billboard Hot 100 chart, becoming Bowie's first hit single in the country. In Canada, it reached number 16 and was his third single on the charts there. Record World said of the reissued single that "this disc is a winner from liftoff to fade". RCA again reissued the song in the UK on 26 September 1975 as a maxi single with two B-sides: 1971's "Changes" and the then-unreleased 1972 outtake "Velvet Goldmine". The UK reissue became Bowie's first number-one single in the country in November.

In September 1979, Bowie re-recorded "Space Oddity" for the ITV New Year special Will Kenny Everett Ever Make It to 1980? Show. The idea came from the show's director, David Mallet. Bowie recalled:

I agreed as long as I could do it again without all its trappings and do it strictly with three instruments. Having played it with just an acoustic guitar on stage early on, I was always surprised at how powerful it was just as a song, without all the strings and synthesisers. I really wanted to do it as a three-piece song.

Visconti produced this new version, which solely featured acoustic guitar, bass, drums and piano. The new recording has a number of differences from the original; the liftoff sequence was replaced with 12 seconds of silence and a snare drum fade-out ends the song. O'Leary said while the original "Space Oddity" ends "unresolved", the 1979 version leaves empty space. This version was issued on 15 February 1980 as the B-side of the single "Alabama Song", which Visconti later said was "never meant" to occur. The 1979 recording was released in a remixed form in 1992 on the Rykodisc reissue of Scary Monsters (and Super Creeps), and in 2017 on Re:Call 3, part of the compilation A New Career in a New Town (1977–1982).

In July 2009, EMI issued the digital-only extended play (EP) "Space Oddity 40th Anniversary EP" to celebrate the 40th anniversary of the original single. The EP includes the original UK and US mono single edits, the 1979 re-recording and eight stem tracks that isolate the lead vocal, backing vocals, acoustic guitar, string, bass and drums, flute and cellos, Mellotron and Stylophone. These stem tracks are accompanied with a mobile app that allows users to create their own remixes. Pegg said the EP "provid[es] a fascinating insight into the component sounds of a classic recording". In 2015, the original UK mono single edit was included on Re:Call 1, as part of the box set Five Years (1969–1973). The song's 50th anniversary was marked on 12 July 2019 by the release of digital and vinyl singles of a new remix of the song by Tony Visconti. The vinyl version was issued in a box set that also includes the original UK mono single edit.

=== Related releases ===
Several demo versions of "Space Oddity" have been commercially released. Two early demos, including a fragment that may be the first-recorded demo of the song, were released for the first time in April 2019 on the box set Spying Through a Keyhole. Another early demo appeared on the 2009 two-CD special edition of David Bowie and was debuted on vinyl in May 2019 in the box set Clareville Grove Demos. An edited version of the March/April 1969 demo originally appeared as the opening track on the 1989 box set Sound + Vision. The unedited recording was released in June 2019 on the album The 'Mercury' Demos. All the abovementioned demos and another previously unreleased one were compiled for the 5-CD box set Conversation Piece, which was released in November 2019. The February 1969 studio recording became commercially available in 1984 on a VHS release of the film Love You till Tuesday and its accompanying soundtrack album. A shorter edit appeared on the 1997 compilation album The Deram Anthology 1966–1968 and an alternative take was released for the first time on Conversation Piece.

== Live versions ==
"Space Oddity" remained a concert staple and a live favourite throughout Bowie's career. Bowie played the song for BBC Radio 1's Johnnie Walker's lunchtime show on 22 May 1972 but the recording was not broadcast; it was eventually released on the compilations BBC Sessions 1969–1972 (Sampler) (1996) and Bowie at the Beeb (2000). For the session, Bowie inserted "I'm just a rocket man!" between verses; Elton John had recently released "Rocket Man", a song also about an astronaut and also produced by Gus Dudgeon.

A live rendition of "Space Oddity", recorded at Santa Monica Civic Auditorium on 20 October 1972 during the Ziggy Stardust Tour, was first released on the bootleg Santa Monica '72 (1994) before becoming officially available in 2008 on Live Santa Monica '72. Another performance, recorded at the Hammersmith Odeon, London, on 3 July 1973, was released on Ziggy Stardust: The Motion Picture (1983). During the 1974 Diamond Dogs Tour, Bowie sang "Space Oddity" while being raised and lowered above the stage by a cherry picker crane and used a radio microphone that was disguised as a telephone. A July 1974 performance of the song was released on the 2005 reissue of David Live while a September performance from the same tour was released in 2017 on Cracked Actor (Live Los Angeles '74).

A concert performance that was recorded on 12 September 1983 was included on the live album Serious Moonlight (Live '83), released as part of the 2018 box set Loving the Alien (1983–1988) and separately the following year. The same performance appears on the concert video Serious Moonlight (1984). Bowie effectively retired the song from live performances during his 1990 Sound+Vision Tour, after which he sang it on a few occasions, most notably closing his 50th birthday party concert in January 1997 with a solo performance on acoustic guitar; this version was released on a limited edition CD-ROM that was issued with Variety magazine in March 1999. He then performed it at the Tibet House US benefit concert at Carnegie Hall in February 2002; this new version includes an orchestra conducted by Visconti, with string arrangements played by Scorchio and Kronos Quartet. Bowie's final performance of "Space Oddity" was at Denmark's Horsens Festival during the 2002 Heathen Tour.

== Music videos ==
Multiple music videos for "Space Oddity" exist. The first, for the Love You till Tuesday version of the song, was filmed at Clarence Studios from 6–7 February 1969. In it, Bowie plays Major Tom, who wears a silver suit, a blue visor and a breast plate, John Hutchinson, Bowie's collaborator plays the ground control character and two models played sirens that might really be angels or aliens or maybe both. RCA used this clip to promote the September 1975 UK single reissue.

Bowie in the 1972 music video for the song. His performance reflected his disinterest in the video.

To promote the December 1972 US reissue, a new promotional video was created at RCA's New York studios by the photographer Mick Rock. In this video, Bowie mimes to the song with a guitar. Bowie later said:

I really hadn't much clue why we were doing this, as I had moved on in my mind from the song, but I suppose the record company were re-releasing it again or something like that. Anyway, I know I was disinterested in the proceedings and it shows in my performance. Mick's video is good, though.

Another video, for the 1979 version, debuted in the UK in December 1979 on the Will Kenny Everett Ever Make It to 1980? Show, and in the US on Dick Clark's Salute to the Seventies. A fourth video, directed by Tim Pope, was created for the 2019 remix of the song to promote the box set Conversation Piece. It combines footage from Bowie's 50th birthday concert at Madison Square Garden with backdrop footage the choreographer Édouard Lock filmed for the 1990 Sound+Vision Tour. The video premiered at the Kennedy Space Center in Florida and at Times Square in New York City on 20 July, and uploaded to YouTube hours later.

== Legacy ==
=== Major Tom ===
Bowie continued the story of the Major Tom character in the single "Ashes to Ashes", from Scary Monsters (and Super Creeps) (1980). In the song, Major Tom is described as a "junkie" who is "strung out in heaven's high, hitting an all time low" but Ground Control still believes he is doing as well as he was ten years prior. The song has been interpreted as Bowie's confrontation of his past; after years of drug addiction in the 1970s, he used those struggles as a metaphor for Major Tom becoming a drug addict. The song's music video reuses visual elements from the December 1979 television performance of "Space Oddity".

Major Tom was revisited again in the 1996 Pet Shop Boys remix of the single "Hallo Spaceboy", from Outside (1995). The idea for the song came from Pet Shop Boys member Neil Tennant, who informed Bowie he would be adding "Space Oddity"-related lines to the remix. Although Bowie was hesitant at first, he accepted. The lines in the remix read: "Ground to Major, bye-bye Tom / Dead the circuit, countdown's wrong".

Major Tom may have influenced the music video for Bowie's 2015 single "Blackstar", the title track from his final album Blackstar (2016). The video, a surreal, ten-minute short film directed by Johan Renck, depicts a woman with a tail (Elisa Lasowski), who discovers a dead astronaut and takes his jewel-encrusted skull to an ancient, otherworldly town. While the astronaut's bones float towards a solar eclipse, a circle of women perform a ritual with the skull in the town's centre. Renck initially refused to confirm or deny that the astronaut in the video is Major Tom but later said on a BBC documentary it was "100% Major Tom" to him.

=== Retrospective acclaim ===
"Space Oddity" remains one of Bowie's most-popular songs and has frequently been listed by publications as one of his greatest. In 2015, Mojo magazine rated it Bowie's 23rd-best track in a list of his 100 greatest songs. Following Bowie's death in 2016, Rolling Stone named "Space Oddity" one of the 30 most-essential songs of his catalogue. A year later, the staff of Consequence of Sound voted it Bowie's tenth-best track. In 2017, NME readers voted "Space Oddity" Bowie's seventh-best while the publication's staff placed it at number 18 in a list of Bowie's 40 best songs.

The Guardian's Alexis Petridis voted "Space Oddity" number 25 in his list of Bowie's 50 greatest songs, writing: "Bowie perfectly inhabits its mood of blank-eyed, space-age alienation". In 2020, Tom Eames of Smooth Radio listed "Space Oddity" as Bowie's fifth-greatest song. Ultimate Classic Rock listed it as Bowie's greatest song in 2016. Spencer Kaufman wrote: "The song was revolutionary for its time, musically and lyrically, and helped introduce the masses to one of the most dynamic and creative music acts we will ever know." In a list ranking every Bowie single from worst to best, the publication placed "Space Oddity" at number four.

"Space Oddity" has appeared on numerous best-of lists. In a 2000 list compiling the 100 greatest rock songs, VH1 placed "Space Oddity" at number 60. In 2012, Consequence of Sound included it in their list of the 100 greatest songs of all time, ranking it number 43. In lists ranking the greatest songs of the 1960s, NME ranked "Space Oddity" at number 20, Pitchfork at number 48, Paste at number three and Treble at number two. In 2021, Rolling Stone placed "Space Oddity" at number 189 in their list of the "500 Greatest Songs of All Time". The magazine stated that as Bowie's first hit, it "offer[ed] just a glimpse of the ever-evolving star he would become". Several publications, including Mojo (39), NME (67), and Sounds (41), have also listed "Space Oddity" as one of the greatest singles of all time. Channel 4 and The Guardian similarly ranked it the 27th-greatest British number-one single in 1997 while NME ranked it number 26 in their 2012 list of the greatest number-one singles in history.

The Rock and Roll Hall of Fame included "Space Oddity" in their list of "The 500 Songs That Shaped Rock and Roll". The song was inducted into the Grammy Hall of Fame in 2018.

== Track listing ==
All songs written by David Bowie.

1969 UK original

1. "Space Oddity" – 4:33 (mono)
2. "Wild Eyed Boy from Freecloud" – 3:52

1969 US original

1. "Space Oddity" – 3:26
2. "Wild Eyed Boy from Freecloud" – 3:20

1969 "Ragazzo solo, ragazza sola"

1. "Ragazzo solo, ragazza sola" (Bowie, Mogol) – 5:15
2. "Wild Eyed Boy from Freecloud" (Bowie) – 4:59

1973 US Reissue

1. "Space Oddity" – 5:05
2. "The Man Who Sold the World" – 3:53

1975 UK reissue

1. "Space Oddity" – 5:15
2. "Changes" – 3:33
3. "Velvet Goldmine" – 3:14

2009 EMI reissue (Digital EP)

1. "Space Oddity" (Original UK mono single edit)
2. "Space Oddity" (US mono single edit)
3. "Space Oddity" (US stereo single edit)
4. "Space Oddity" (1979 rerecording)
5. "Space Oddity" (Bass and drums)
6. "Space Oddity" (Strings)
7. "Space Oddity" (Acoustic guitar)
8. "Space Oddity" (Mellotron)
9. "Space Oddity" (Backing vocal, flute and cellos)
10. "Space Oddity" (Stylophone and guitar)
11. "Space Oddity" (Lead vocal)
12. "Space Oddity" (Main backing vocal including countdown)

2019 reissue (2×7")

Disc 1

1. "Space Oddity" (Original Mono Single Edit)
2. "Wild Eyed Boy from Freecloud" (Original Mono Single Version)

Disc 2

1. "Space Oddity" (2019 Mix – Single Edit)
2. "Wild Eyed Boy from Freecloud" (2019 Mix – Single Version)

== Personnel ==
1969 original version

- David Bowie – vocals, 12-string acoustic guitar, Stylophone, handclaps
- Mick Wayne – electric guitar
- Herbie Flowers – bass guitar
- Terry Cox – drums
- Rick Wakeman – Mellotron
- Unknown musicians – eight violins, two violas, two celli, two arco basses, two flutes

Production

- Gus Dudgeon – producer
- Barry Sheffield – engineer
- David Bowie, Paul Buckmaster – arrangements

1979 version

- David Bowie – vocals, 12-string acoustic guitar
- Andy Clark – piano
- Zaine Griff – bass guitar
- Andy Duncan – drums

Production

- David Bowie – producer
- Tony Visconti – producer, engineer

== Charts and certifications ==
=== Weekly charts ===
Weekly chart performance for "Space Oddity"
Year	Chart	Peak position
1969	Ireland (IRMA)	13
1969	UK Singles (Official Charts)	5
1969	US Billboard Hot 100	124
1973	Australia (Go-Set)	11
1973	Australia (Kent Music Report)	9
1973	Canadian Top 100 Singles (RPM)	16
1973	New Zealand (Listener)	6
1973	US Billboard Hot 100	15
1973	US Cash Box Top 100	17
1975	Ireland (IRMA)	3
1975	Netherlands (Dutch Top 40)	4
1975	UK Singles (OCC)	1
1983	UK Singles (OCC)	85
2013	Belgium (Ultratop 50 Flanders)	20
2013	France (SNEP)	144
2013	Netherlands (Single Top 100)	4
2013	Sweden (Sverigetopplistan)	15
2016	Australia (ARIA)	31
2016	Austria (Ö3 Austria Top 40)	27
2016	Belgium (Ultratop 50 Wallonia)	42
2016	Canada Top Singles (RPM)	16
2016	France (SNEP)	1
2016	Germany (GfK)	40
2016	Hungary (Single Top 40)	23
2016	Italy (FIMI)	26
2016	Japan Hot 100 (Billboard)	99
2016	New Zealand (Recorded Music NZ)	39
2016	Portugal (Hung Medien)	30
2016	Spain (Promusicae)	75
2016	Switzerland (Schweizer Hitparade)	15
2016	UK Singles (OCC)	24
2016	US Hot Rock & Alternative Songs (Billboard)	4

=== Year-end charts ===
Year-end chart performance for "Space Oddity"
Year	Chart	Position
1973	US Billboard Hot 100	97
1975	UK Singles (OCC)	17
2016	US Hot Rock Songs (Billboard)	66

=== Certifications ===
Sales certifications for "Space Oddity"
Region	Certification	Certified units/sales
Denmark (IFPI Danmark)	Gold	45,000^{‡}
Italy (FIMI)	Platinum	70,000^{‡}
New Zealand (RMNZ)	2× Platinum	60,000^{‡}
Spain (Promusicae)	Gold	30,000^{‡}
United Kingdom (BPI)	Platinum	600,000^{‡}
^{‡} Sales+streaming figures based on certification alone.

== Cover versions and appearances in media ==
"Space Oddity" has been covered by numerous artists, including Rick Wakeman and Terry Cox's band Pentangle; both men were performers on the original recording. One of Bowie's favourite versions was a recording by the Langley Schools Music Project, a 60-voice choir of Canadian children, recorded in the late 1970s and reissued on CD in 2002. Bowie said: "The backing arrangement is astounding. Coupled with the earnest if lugubrious vocal performance, you have a piece of art that I couldn't have conceived of, even with half of Colombia's finest export products in me." In 1977, David Matthews covered the song, which was later sampled by MF Doom for his 2004 song "Rapp Snitch Knishes". Other artists have written songs that reference or develop the story of "Space Oddity"; these include Peter Schilling's "Major Tom (Coming Home)" (1983), Def Leppard's "Rocket" (1987), and Panic on the Titanic's "Major Tom" (1993). In 1984, the English singer-songwriter Jonathan King released a mashup of "Space Oddity" together with Schilling's "Major Tom (Coming Home)" titled "Space Oddity / Major Tom (Coming Home)", which reached number 77 on the UK Singles Chart in May.

"Space Oddity" has been heard and referenced in numerous films and television series, including the American sitcom Friends, the British series EastEnders and Shooting Stars, and the films Mr. Deeds (2002), The Mother (2003) and C.R.A.Z.Y. (2005). The original single version is heard on the soundtrack of the 2004 film The Life and Death of Peter Sellers and a 2015 episode of the American drama series Mad Men. It was also featured in a 2011 Renault Clio commercial and played on the radio of Elon Musk's Tesla Roadster during its launch aboard the Falcon Heavy's maiden flight in February 2018.

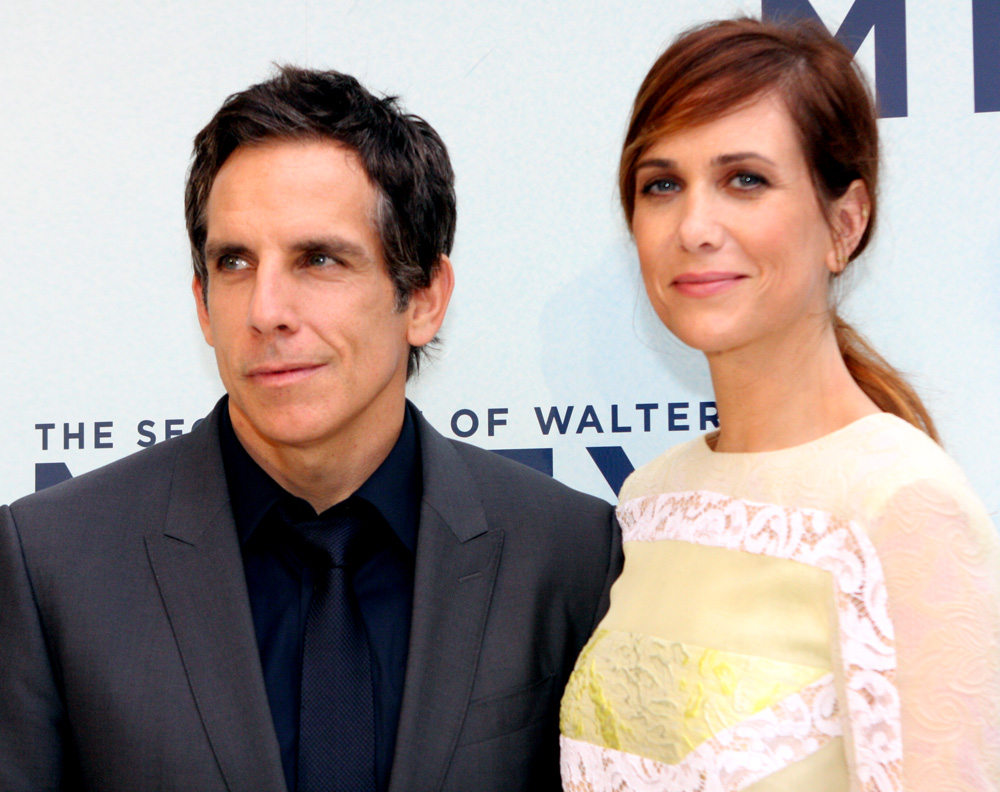
"Space Oddity" appears in The Secret Life of Walter Mitty, directed by Ben Stiller (pictured at a premiere of the film on the left).

"Space Oddity" plays a pivotal role in the 2013 film The Secret Life of Walter Mitty, in which Walter Mitty (Ben Stiller) is frequently referred to as "Major Tom" for daydreaming while at work. The song is featured in a scene in which Mitty decides to leap onto a helicopter after imagining his coworker Cheryl (Kristen Wiig) singing the song. For the scene, Wiig's vocal was mixed into Bowie's original track. Stiller said about the importance of "Space Oddity" in the scene:

I felt like the way it fits into the story, we got to this point and this scene which was sort of how the fantasy and reality come together for Walter, and that was what that came out of. That song, and what he mentioned in his head, and what he imagines and what he does, it all just seemed to come together over that song.

"Space Oddity" was played throughout the opening montage for the 2017 film Valerian and the City of a Thousand Planets, which showed humans making contact with extraterrestrial life. The director Luc Besson timed the sequences of the scene to the song's guitar chords, which took many hours, and the bass riff was used to signify humanity's first contact with aliens. The opening sequence had originally been storyboarded with the intention of 'Space Oddity' being played in the background, with Besson saying "It's almost a music video; I matched the song to the image." Besson previously worked with Bowie on Arthur and the Invisibles (2006), and the singer agreed to allow Besson to use "Space Oddity" in Valerian, although Bowie died before the film was released. The song also appears in the 2014 Hong Kong comedy horror film The Midnight After.

=== Chris Hadfield version ===
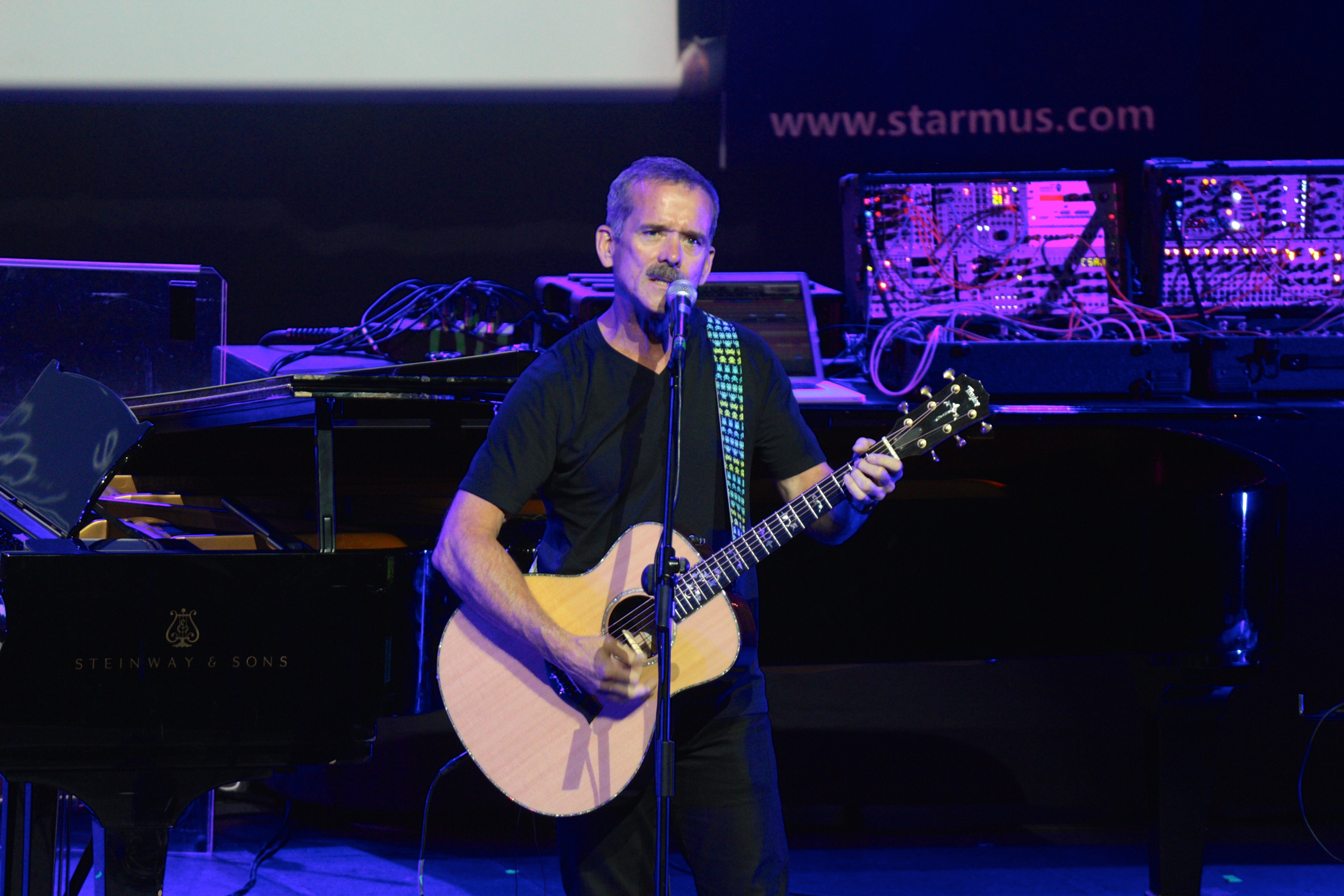
Hadfield performing "Space Oddity" at the 2016 Starmus Festival.

In May 2013, the Canadian astronaut and artist Chris Hadfield, commander of Expedition 35 to the International Space Station (ISS), recorded a video of "Space Oddity" while stationed on the ISS that went viral and generated media coverage. It was the first music video to be recorded in space. In the video, filmed towards the end of Hadfield's time on the ISS, Hadfield sang and played guitar while floating around the space station. On Earth, Joe Corcoran produced and mixed the backing track with a piano arrangement by the multi-instrumentalist Emm Gryner, who worked with Bowie during his 1999–2000 concert tours. Gryner said she was "so proud to be a part of it".

The lyrics were somewhat altered; rather than losing communication with Ground Control and being lost in space as a result, Major Tom receives his orders to land and does so safely, reflecting Hadfield's imminent return from his final mission to the ISS. The song also mentions the Soyuz spacecraft that Hadfield travelled in. Hadfield announced the video on his Twitter account: "With deference to the genius of David Bowie, here's Space Oddity, recorded on Station. A last glimpse of the World." Bowie's social media team responded to the video, tweeting back to Hadfield, "Hallo Spaceboy ...", and later called the cover "possibly the most poignant version of the song ever created".

Hadfield's performance was the subject of a piece by Glenn Fleishman in The Economist on 22 May 2013 analyzing the legal implications of publicly performing a copyrighted work of music while in Earth orbit. "Space Oddity" is the only song of Bowie's for which he did not own the copyright; his publisher granted Hadfield a one-year licence to the song. When the one-year licence expired on 13 May 2014, the official video was taken offline despite Bowie's explicit wishes for the publisher to grant Hadfield a licence at no charge to record the song and produce the video. Following negotiations, the video was restored to YouTube on 2 November 2014 with a two-year licence agreement. Pegg says Hadfield's video is "Breathtakingly beautiful and extraordinarily moving, [and] offers a rare opportunity to deploy that overused adjective 'awesome' with complete justification".

== See also ==
- "Ashes to Ashes" (David Bowie song)
- "Hallo Spaceboy"
- "Blackstar" (song)
