= Spying Through a Keyhole =

2019 box set by David Bowie

Box set by David Bowie
- Released: 5 April 2019
- Recorded: January–November 1968
- Length: 27:12
- Label: Parlophone

David Bowie chronology
| Glastonbury 2000 (2018) | Spying Through a Keyhole (2019) | Clareville Grove Demos (2019) |

Spying Through a Keyhole is a box set by English musician David Bowie, released in April 2019. The set includes four 7" vinyl records containing nine songs written and performed by Bowie during 1968, the era in which he was writing for his album David Bowie (1969). All songs in the collection are presented in mono, demo form.

Professional ratings
Review scores
| Source | Rating |
|---|---|
| Pitchfork | 7.0/10 |

== Background ==
Announced in January 2019, the box set was released to coincide with the 50th anniversary of Bowie's 1969 album David Bowie. The title is taken from one of the included, previously unknown songs called "Love Is All Around". Some of the songs in the collection ("London Bye, Ta-Ta", "In The Heat of the Morning", and "Space Oddity") have been released before, but not in this form. A brief excerpt from "Space Oddity" is believed to be the first demo of the song that Bowie ever recorded. The set includes early photos of Bowie, including one taken in his friend (and frequent album producer and musician) Tony Visconti's apartment in 1968. The box set was made available on streaming services such as Spotify on 21 June 2019.

=== Recording dates ===
The box set's liner notes suggest that all tracks, beside "Space Oddity", had been recorded between January and February 1968, just prior to the studio session for "In The Heat of the Morning" and "London Bye, Ta-Ta" in March 1968. The two "Space Oddity" demos are speculated to have been recorded in November, when the song was claimed to have been written.

== Track listing ==
All tracks are written by David Bowie.

| No. | Title | Length |
|---|---|---|
| 1. | "Mother Grey" (demo) | 2:59 |
| 2. | "In the Heat of the Morning" (demo) | 3:04 |
| 3. | "Goodbye 3d (Threepenny) Joe" (demo) | 3:20 |
| 4. | "Love All Around" (demo) | 2:51 |
| 5. | "London Bye, Ta-Ta" (demo) | 3:31 |
| 6. | "Angel, Angel, Grubby Face" (demo version 1) | 2:34 |
| 7. | "Angel, Angel, Grubby Face" (demo version 2) | 2:36 |
| 8. | "Space Oddity" (demo excerpt) | 2:41 |
| 9. | "Space Oddity" (demo – alternative lyrics [with John 'Hutch' Hutchinson]) | 4:05 |
| Total length: | | 27:12 |

== Charts ==
| Chart (2019) | Peak position |
|---|---|
| French Albums (SNEP) | 118 |
| Scottish Albums (Official Charts) | 15 |
| UK Albums (Official Charts) | 55 |
