= Emm Gryner =

Canadian singer-songwriter (born 1975)

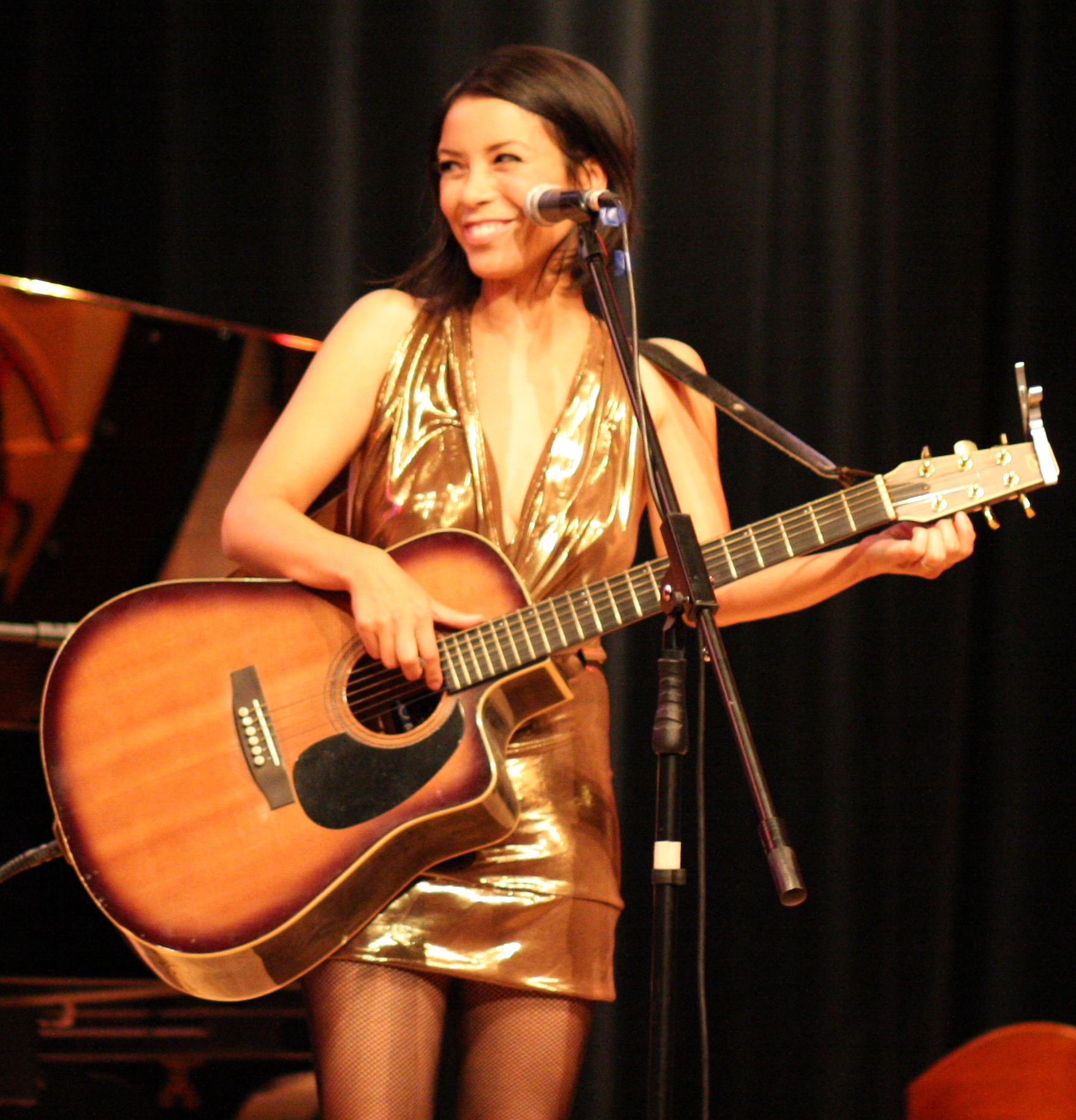
- Gryner in 2010

Background information
- Born: Sarnia, Ontario, Canada
- Origin: Toronto, Ontario, Canada
- Genres: Pop, alternative rock
- Occupation: Singer-songwriter
- Instruments: Vocals, bass guitar, guitar, keyboards
- Labels: Dead Daisy, Mercury
- Website: emmgryner.com

Emm Gryner (born in Sarnia, Ontario) is a Canadian singer, songwriter, recording artist, and author. She has released 20 albums as a solo performer, and has collaborated with artists including David Bowie and Chris Hadfield.

== Early life ==
Gryner's childhood was spent in Forest, Ontario. Her father was of half Irish heritage and her mother was Filipina. She started to learn piano at age 4, picked up bass around age 14, and later took up guitar as well.

Gryner attended North Lambton Secondary School in Forest, Ontario. Following high school, she graduated from Fanshawe College's Music Industry Arts program in 1995.

Gryner has two brothers, Tony and record producer and musician Frank.

== Career ==
Gryner started her music career in Toronto, where her original song "Wisdom Bus" won a nationwide songwriting contest sponsored by Standard Broadcasting. With the prize money, she recorded an album called The Original Leap Year and released it on her own Dead Daisy Records. The album attracted the attention of Mercury Records, who signed Gryner to a recording contract.

Gryner's first release on Mercury was 1998's Public, a Britpop-inspired album that yielded a Canadian hit called "Summerlong". She was nominated for the Best New Solo Artist Juno Award in 1999.

=== Bowie Band ===
In 1999, Gryner was asked to join David Bowie's band as a backup singer and keyboard player. The gig saw Gryner performing with Bowie at Glastonbury Festival, on Later with Jools Holland, Saturday Night Live, and other venues around America and Europe. She appears on the live albums Glastonbury 2000 and Bowie at the Beeb, as well as Toy.

=== Solo career ===
After Universal Music took over Mercury Records, Gryner returned to her Dead Daisy Records label, releasing several albums, including Girl Versions and Asianblue, which were both nominated for Pop Album of the Year at the Juno Awards.

Gryner released Songs of Love and Death, an album of cover versions of Irish songs, in 2005. The album attracted the attention of Irish media, and Gryner appeared on programs like The Late Late Show during her subsequent tour of Ireland.

Between 2006 and 2020, Gryner released 11 albums, four EPs, and a "best of" compilation with two unreleased tracks. The Summer of High Hopes, produced by Nathan Larson, was released in Canada and later in Ireland on the heels of a performance at Oxegen Festival; The Irish Times' Siobhàn Long said it was "the distilled voice of an original". In the November 2006 issue of Q, U2 frontman Bono recognized the track "Almighty Love" as one of six songs that he wished he had written from the last twenty years of music.

Her 2014 album Torrential was called "superb pop" by The Irish Times' Tony Clayton-Lea.

During the COVID-19 pandemic, Gryner released the singles "Stronger Someone", in support of Bluewater Health Foundation, and "All Love All The Time" with Rob Wells, as well as the album Just For You, a collection of jazz standards.

=== Space Oddity in space ===
In May 2013, Gryner arranged and performed piano on astronaut Chris Hadfield's cover version of David Bowie's "Space Oddity". The music video for the song features Hadfield on the International Space Station and is considered the first ever filmed in space.

Fanshawe College presents an annual Emm Gryner and Chris Hadfield Music Industry Arts Award to a Year 2 student in the School of Contemporary Media who demonstrates "a keen interest [...] in the creative and technical aspects of the music industry [and] leadership characteristics with respect to his or her classmates, faculty and staff, as well as exceptional creativity and dedication".

=== Other collaborations ===
Gryner collaborated with Larson in the band Hot One and appeared on the group's self-titled album in 2006.

She is also a member of the collective The Cake Sale, along with Gary Lightbody of Snow Patrol, Bell X1, Josh Ritter, and Glen Hansard. The collective is featured on The Cake Sale, a multi-platinum-selling Irish album with proceeds to Oxfam's Make Trade Fair.

In 2011, Gryner formed Trent Severn with Dayna Manning and Laura C. Bates. Their debut self-titled album was released on Gryner's Dead Daisy Records label in 2012, followed by Trillium (2015) and Portage (2017).

In 2014, Gryner assembled the band Trapper with Sean Kelly (on guitar), brother Frank Gryner (on guitar), Jordan Kern (on bass) and Tim Timleck (ex-Universal Honey on drums), playing "1980s-style melodic hard rock." In May 2015, Trapper opened for Brit-rockers Def Leppard on three Canadian tour dates in Montréal, Ottawa and London, Ontario. Gryner had met and become friends with Def Leppard lead singer Joe Elliott when she toured as a backing singer with David Bowie.

Gryner performs her ballad-style cover of Def Leppard's Pour Some Sugar On Me, arranged for the Royal Philharmonic Orchestra by Eric Gorfain, with the band on their album Drastic Symphonies.

"When we heard her version of Sugar we were all blown away. It really worked as an arrangement. So I asked her if she fancied doing her version of Sugar with us. [...]" For Joe, this is the most important track on Drastic Symphonies. "It's an absolutely brand new version," he says[...]

— Paul Elliott, "How Def Leppard recorded Drastic Symphonies", Louder (May 9, 2023)

She also appeared with Def Leppard and the BBC Concert Orchestra on BBC Radio 2's Piano Room in support of the album, performing "Pour Some Sugar On Me", "Hysteria", and Bowie's "Life On Mars".

=== Other work ===
In 2005, Gryner was featured as a fallen angel in the video for Daniel Victor's The Grace of album Act I:A Goodbye Friends of the Heavenly Bodies, reaching #1 on Much Music and International modern rock radio charts, becoming the sixth most-played song on Canadian Rock Radio charts and certified Gold in 2006.

In 2008, Gryner acted and sang in One Week, a film by director Michael McGowan. In the film she sings "Un Canadien errant"; she also contributed her song "Blackwinged Bird" to the soundtrack.

In the summers of 2007 and 2008, Gryner and Danny Michel co-hosted Under the Covers, a radio show about cover songs, on CBC Radio One.

In October 2016, Gryner starred in Joni Mitchell: River at the Grand Theatre in London, Ontario along with Louise Pitre and Brendan Wall. The play and performers met with positive reviews: in the London Free Press Joe Belanger commented that "her vocal range, the emotional qualities of her voice and its sound [are] like a touchstone to Mitchell throughout," and Mary Alderson wrote that "she is stunning in her a capella numbers".

In September 2021, ECW Press released Gryner's book The Healing Power of Singing: Raise Your Voice, Change Your Life (What Touring with David Bowie, Single Parenting and Ditching the Music Business Taught Me in 25 Easy Steps), described as "part study in the art of singing, part guide to finding one's voice, and part memoir." The book became an Amazon bestseller in 2022.

=== Dead Daisy Records ===
Gryner's label, Dead Daisy Records, also released the debut records for Atlantic Canadian indie band In-Flight Safety, Daniel Ledwell, Andrew Spice, Cicero, and Toronto songwriter Royal Wood.

== Discography ==
- And Distrust It (1995)
- The Original Leap Year (1997)
- Public (1998)
- Science Fair (1999)
- Dead Relatives (2000)
- Girl Versions (2001)
- The Winter (EP) (2002)
- Asianblue (2002)
- Songs of Love and Death (2005)
- The Great Lakes (2005)
- The Summer of High Hopes (2006)
- PVT (2006) (originally issued as a bonus disc with The Summer of High Hopes, later sold separately)
- Goddess (2009)
- Stray Bullets EP (2010)
- Gem and I (2010)
- Northern Gospel (2011)
- She's Gone: A Hall & Oates Tribute EP (2012)
- The Best of Emm Gryner (2012)
- FrostPop (EP) (2013)
- Torrential (2014)
- 21st Century Ballads (2015)
- Calmphonic (2016)
- Aonarán (2016)
- Slant (EP) (2017)
- Only of Earth: Days of Games (2017)
- Just for You (2020)
- Business & Pleasure (2023)
