= Mark Balderas =

American musician

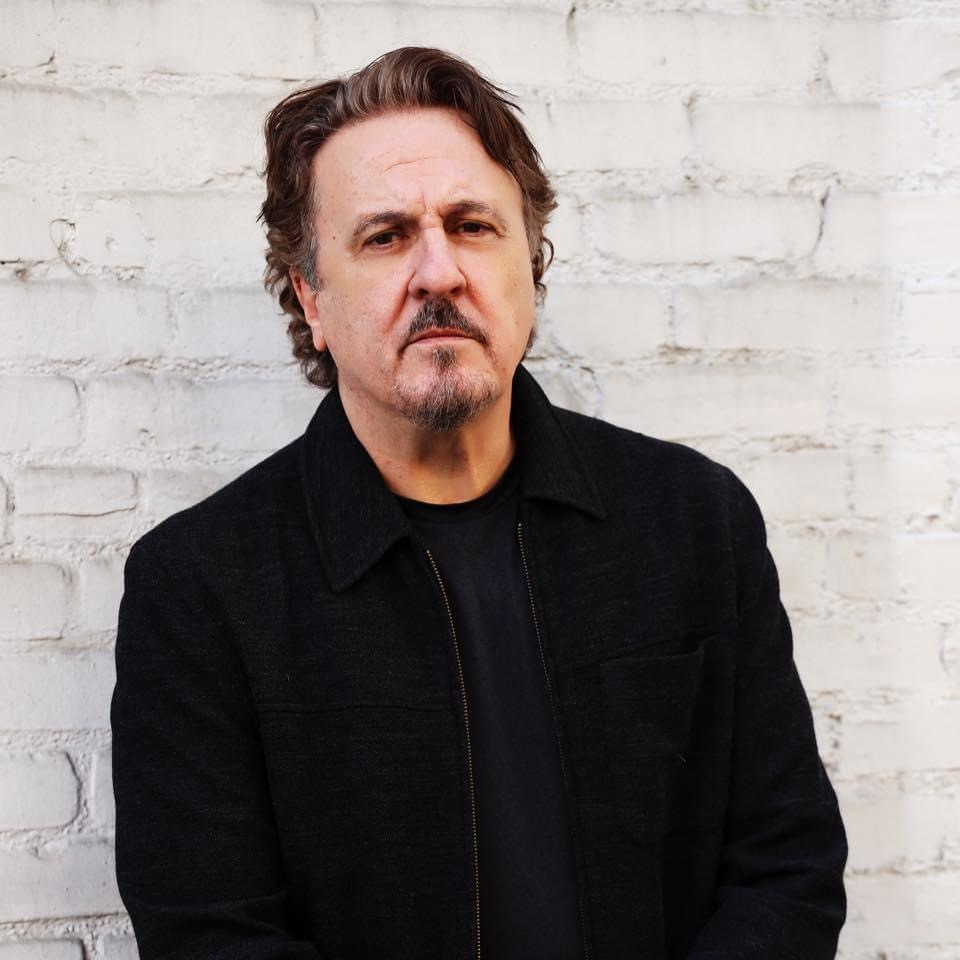

Background information
- Born: Mark Henry Balderas; September 10, 1959 (age 66)
- Origin: Encino, California
- Genres: Rock, Alternative Rock, Gothic Rock
- Occupations: Keyboardist, Background Vocalist
- Years active: 1983 - Present
- Labels: RCA Records; Projekt Records; Triple X Records; Noise Kontrol (Mexico); Opcion Sonica (Mexico); The Orchard; Fonarte Latino (Mexico); Sunset Blvd Records; Bob Frank Entertainment
- Member of: Human Drama

Mark Balderas (born September 10, 1959, in Encino, California) is the keyboardist for the rock band Human Drama.

== Early life ==
Balderas was raised in West Hills, California, by Elisa Balderas, a housewife, and Henry Balderas, a manufacturer's representative in the electronics industry. He attended El Camino Real High School in Woodland Hills, California, where he played varsity American football. He went on to earn an Associate of Arts degree at Pierce College in Woodland Hills in 1980, and a Bachelor of Arts at California State University, Northridge, in 1982, majoring in Radio-Television-Film.

== Musical career ==
Balderas started playing keyboards in Los Angeles with the band Newsbreak in 1983. The following year, he joined The Spectres. While playing with The Spectres in 1986, he auditioned for New Orleans, Louisiana, based Human Drama and became their keyboard player soon after. Human Drama contributed a song, "Wave of Darkness", to the 1987 collection Scream: The Compilation on Geffen Records.

A record deal with RCA Records in 1988 led to the EP "Hopes Prayers Dreams Heart Soul Mind Love Life Death" recorded at the famous Rockfield Studios in Wales and the LP Feel, both produced by Ian Broudie of The Lightning Seeds.

In mid-1990, after recording the single "This Tangled Web" from the critically acclaimed album The World Inside on Triple X Records, Balderas left the group to team up with keyboard player James Osborn to start recording a collection of traditional Christmas songs which they arranged and produced using keyboard orchestration. Their waltz version of the classic "What Child is This" was released in 1995 on the compilation Excelsis Vol.1: A Dark Noel on Projekt Records. In 1991, Balderas joined up with Human Drama guitarist Michael Ciravolo's new band The Congregation.

In 1993, with the release of Human Drama’s fourth album Pinups on Triple X Records, Balderas returned, this time for good. In 1994, Human Drama released the EP Human Drama on Projekt Records which included the first of five instrumentals songs, "Solitude I", written by Balderas. He also re-arranged "The Waiting Hour" from Feel with piano, strings and flute. The following year, Human Drama released Songs of Betrayal where Balderas added the remaining four instrumental songs "Solitude II-V". In 1996, Human Drama released Fourteen Thousand Three Hundred Eighty Four Days Later, a live, career-spanning retrospective released both on Hollow Hills/Triple X Records and the Mexican Opcion Sonica label. In 1997, Balderas recorded piano on Michael Aston's Gene Loves Jezebel album Love Lies Bleeding on Triple X Records. The song Lifting the Vale was later on the series Everwood Season 4 Episode 9 “Getting to know You”. He then co-wrote, with Johnny Indovina, the popular "A Single White Rose" for the next Human Drama album Solemn Sun Setting in 1998 on Triple X Records and in 2000, Human Drama released The Best of Human Drama...In a Perfect World on Triple X Records. In 2002, Human Drama released their final album, Cause and Effect, both on Projekt Records and, in Latin America, Noise Kontrol Records. Human Drama continued to perform live throughout America and Mexico until January 2005.

After a seven year hiatus, Balderas and Human Drama got back together to perform a reunion concert at the El Plaza Condesa on August 25, 2012 in Mexico City followed by another concert in Mexico City at Circo Volador on October 31, 2015.. With the success of these performances, they decided to record a new album. Balderas added piano and other vintage keyboards sounds for the album Broken Songs For Broken People released on September 29,2017 on Fonarte Latino Records. on Fonarte Latino Records. They filmed three music videos "Rain On Me", "The Liar Inside", and "Like This One". After supporting the album with performances in California and Mexico, the band was back in the studio recording their next album. Blurred Images was released on April 30, 2021 on Sunset Blvd Records.. Balderas co-wrote two of the compositions "Into Our Escape" and "February 10" with Johnny Indovina. Again Balderas provided piano and old vintage sounds from the 1960's and 1970's such as (Wurlitzer, Fendor Rhodes, Mini Moog, Mellotron, and Hammond B3 Organ. They filmed three music videos to support the album,February 10th, Another Crash, and Into Our Escape. During the making of this album, Balderas with Indovina performed an acoustical concert backed with Gerardo Pozos - Violin and Claudia Gonzalez - Flute from Mexico City, at the Concert Hall Sala Nezahualcoyotl at the University of Mexico City on November 29, 2019.. This performance prompted Balderas and Indovina to start working on their latest album Ten Small Fractures. This acoustic album was a compilation of ten previous classic hits from Human Drama and arranged for piano by Balderas and accompanied with violin, flute, bass and nylon string guitar. Ten Small Fractures was released on July 28, 2023 on Bob Frank Entertainment Records.. They released one music video Dying In A Moment Of Splendor. In 2022, Human Drama performed their 35th anniversary at the Teatro Metropolitan in Mexico City. They performed three albums (Pinups, Cause and Effect, and The World Inside)..

In 2025, Balderas and his partner James Osborn, finally released the full album Symfonik Christmas on Sunset Blvd Records.. Produced and arranged by Balderas & Osborn, the album includes many of the traditional songs such as Deck The Halls and O Holy Night, as well as Dance Of The Sugar Plum Fairy & Waltz of the Flowers from Pyotr Ilyich Tchaikovsky’s - The Nutcracker.
