= Come On Up to the House: Women Sing Waits =

Compilation album by Various artists
- Released: November 22, 2019
- Genre: Americana, folk
- Length: 55:15
- Label: Dualtone Records
- Producer: Warren Zanes

Come On Up to the House: Women Sing Waits is a tribute album of Tom Waits songs performed by established female singers. The album was released in late 2019 by Dualtone Records, a couple weeks in advance of Waits' 70th birthday. Among the individual artists and groups featured are Rosanne Cash, Phoebe Bridgers, Iris DeMent, Patty Griffin, Joseph (group), Shelby Lynne & Allison Moorer, Aimee Mann and The Wild Reeds.

The project was initiated by Dualtone president Scott Robinson, who invited author and musician Warren Zanes to serve as producer. Zanes personally contacted most of the artists, offering them the opportunity to select the songs they would like to record. None of the album's 12 tracks was previously released.

== Track listing ==
All tracks are written by Tom Waits, except as indicated. Notes next to titles identify the original Waits albums on which the songs appeared.

| No. | Title | Writer(s) | Artist(s) | Length |
|---|---|---|---|---|
| 1. | "Come On Up to the House" (Mule Variations 1999) | Waits, Kathleen Brennan | Joseph | 4:00 |
| 2. | "Hold On" (Mule Variations 1999) | Waits, Brennan | Aimee Mann | 5:23 |
| 3. | "Georgia Lee" (Mule Variations 1999) | Waits, Brennan | Phoebe Bridgers | 4:18 |
| 4. | "Ol' 55" (Closing Time 1973) | | Shelby Lynne & Allison Moorer | 5:29 |
| 5. | "Take It With Me" (Mule Variations 1999) | Waits, Brennan | Angie McMahon | 4:06 |
| 6. | "Jersey Girl" (Heartattack and Vine 1980) | | Corinne Bailey Rae | 2:34 |
| 7. | "Ruby's Arms" (Heartattack and Vine 1980) | | Patty Griffin | 6:06 |
| 8. | "Time" (Rain Dogs 1985) | | Rosanne Cash | 4:37 |
| 9. | "You Can Never Hold Back Spring" (Orphans: Brawlers, Bawlers and Bastards 2006) | Waits, Brennan | Kat Edmonson | 2:22 |
| 10. | "House Where Nobody Lives" (Mule Variations 1999) | | Iris DeMent | 4:22 |
| 11. | "Downtown Train" (Rain Dogs 1985) | | Courtney Marie Andrews | 4:14 |
| 12. | "Tom Traubert's Blues" (Small Change 1976) | | The Wild Reeds | 4:45 |
| Total length: | | | | 55:15 |
