= There Is Only You =

There Is Only You may refer to:

- There Is Only You (album), 2014 album by The Xcerts
- "There Is Only You", song by Human Drama from the albums Fourteen Thousand Three Hundred Eighty Four Days Later and Feel (Human Drama album)
- "There Is Only You", 1998 song by Christian rock band Smalltown Poets from Listen Closely
- "There Is Only You", song by Roy Rogers (guitarist) from Slideways
