= Black Country Rock =

Song by David Bowie

from the album The Man Who Sold the World
- Released: 4 November 1970
- Recorded: 1–22 May 1970
- Studio: Trident and Advision, London
- Genre: Blues rock; hard rock
- Length: 3:32
- Label: Mercury
- Songwriter: David Bowie
- Producer: Tony Visconti

"Black Country Rock" is a song by the English musician David Bowie, released on his 1970 album The Man Who Sold the World. The song was recorded in May 1970, with sessions taking place at Trident and Advision Studios in London. The lineup featured Bowie on lead vocals, guitarist Mick Ronson, bassist/producer Tony Visconti, drummer Mick Woodmansey and Ralph Mace on Moog synthesiser. The track was mostly composed by Ronson and Visconti, who developed it using a basic song sketch from Bowie. Labelled under the working title "Black Country Rock", Bowie used the title to write the lyrics towards the end of the sessions, resulting in a repeated two-line verse and chorus. A blues rock and hard rock number, Bowie imitates T. Rex's Marc Bolan in his vocal performance.

Since its release, "Black Country Rock" has received positive reviews from music critics and biographers, who have mostly praised the performance of the band. Some publications have ranked it one of Bowie's best songs. The song, which also appeared as the B-side of the single "Holy Holy" in January 1971, was included on the Sound + Vision box set in 1989. It was remastered in 2015 as part of the Five Years (1969–1973) box set and was remixed by Visconti in 2020 to celebrate its 50th anniversary.

== Writing and recording ==
Recording for David Bowie's third studio album The Man Who Sold the World began on 17 April 1970 at Advision Studios in London, moving to Trident Studios four days later and continuing there for the rest of April until mid-May, thereafter moving back to Advision until the sessions completed on 22 May. According to biographer Chris O'Leary, "Black Country Rock" was recorded in May. The lineup for the sessions included Bowie, guitarist Mick Ronson, bassist and producer Tony Visconti, drummer Mick Woodmansey and Ralph Mace on Moog synthesiser. As Bowie was preoccupied with his new wife Angie at the time, as well as managerial issues, the album's music was largely arranged by Ronson and Visconti.

After living in Beckenham's Haddon Hall for months, the trio of Ronson, Visconti and Woodmansey accumulated rehearsal time and jam sessions that O'Leary believes gave them an edge over the backing band of Bowie's previous album, David Bowie (Space Oddity) (1969), which included a group of randomly assembled musicians. This resulted in tighter band performances for The Man Who Sold the World. According to O'Leary, Bowie came into the sessions with a basic track idea, which Ronson and Visconti further developed, temporarily labeling it "Black Country Rock". Towards the end of the sessions, running out of time to write lyrics, Bowie used the working title as a basis, resulting in a minimal lyric—"a single repeated two-line verse and chorus".

== Composition ==
"Black Country Rock" has been characterised as blues rock and hard rock, while author James Perone calls it a mix of "electric blues [and] heavy metal". An upbeat number, the song has been described by NME editors Roy Carr and Charles Shaar Murray as a "respite" from the musical and thematical heaviness of the remainder of the album. Its style has been compared to Marc Bolan's contemporary T. Rex, down to Bowie's imitative vibrato in the final verse. According to Visconti, Bowie did a Bolan impression "spontaneously ... because he ran out of lyrics ... we all thought it was cool, so it stayed." O'Leary notes the imitation is most prevalent in the delivery of "fond adieu" followed by a "gargled" "ahh!" Visconti used an equalizer on the vocal tracks to better match the music, resulting in a "thinner" sound. O'Leary calls the delivery of "my friend" in the last refrain as "uncanny".

Structurally, the verses and refrains are in E major and the bridges are in C major. It contains a similar chord sequence as Bowie's 1969 track "Unwashed and Somewhat Slightly Dazed". The song begins with what O'Leary calls an "arpeggiated intro bar" before Ronson's double-tracked guitar enters four seconds in. He plays an ascending riff before Visconti's counters it four seconds later. The guitar and bass complement each other throughout, playing descending and ascending motifs in the bridges and before a 16-bar guitar solo. Mace's Moog synthesiser is prominent in the solos, where he played a low A note, which O'Leary compares to a "system overload warning". Author Peter Doggett compares Woodmansey's drum fills to the stutter of a machine gun. The drums were overlaid by tambourine in the verses and refrains, and by a shaker in the bridges. Later on, Ronson's piano enters towards the coda after the three-minute mark.

== Release and reception ==
The Man Who Sold the World was released in the United States by Mercury Records on 4 November 1970, and in the United Kingdom on 10 April 1971. "Black Country Rock" was sequenced as the third track on side one of the original LP, between "All the Madmen" and "After All". The song also appeared as the B-side of the single "Holy Holy", released in January 1971.

Since its release, "Black Country Rock" has received positive reviews from music critics and biographers, who have mostly praised the performance of the band. AllMusic's Ned Raggett praises the track as a highlight of The Man Who Sold the World, calling it "simple, but powerful" and an effective tribute to T. Rex. He further commends Ronson's guitar work and Bowie's "spot-on" vocal impression of Bolan. O'Leary states that although the track was intended as "filler", the ending result was "far better": "one of the album's best ensemble performances and a testament to Ronson's econcomic arranging skills." Pegg similarly compliments the band's performance. Perone and Doggett praise the track's musical arrangement, while the former finds the lyric "[not] substantial". Mojo magazine listed it as Bowie's 50th greatest song in 2015. In 2018, the staff of NME placed it at number 34 in a list of Bowie's 40 best songs. Three years later in 2021, the staff of The Telegraph ranked "Black Country Rock" as among Bowie's 20 greatest songs.

== Subsequent releases ==
"Black Country Rock" was included on the Sound + Vision box set in 1989. In 2015, the song, along with the rest of its parent album, was remastered for Parlophone's Five Years (1969–1973) box set. It was released on CD, vinyl and digital formats, both as part of the compilation and separately. The song was later remixed by Visconti in 2020 to commemorate the 50th anniversary of The Man Who Sold the World. The album was released under its original intended title of Metrobolist. The song also appeared in the soundtrack of the 2010 film The Kids Are All Right.

== Personnel ==
According to biographer Chris O'Leary:

- David Bowie – lead vocal
- Mick Ronson – lead and rhythm guitars, piano
- Tony Visconti – bass
- Mick Woodmansey – drums, tambourine, shaker
- Ralph Mace – Moog synthesiser

Technical

- Tony Visconti – producer
- Ken Scott – engineer
- Gerald Chevin – engineer
