= By Jingo =

Euphemistic expression

The expression by Jingo is a British minced oath that appeared rarely in print, but which may be traced as far back as to at least the 17th century in a transparent euphemism for "by Jesus". The OED attests the first appearance in 1694, in an English edition of the works of François Rabelais as a translation for the French par Dieu! ("by God!").

The full expression is "By the living Jingo", substituting for the phrase "By the living God" (referring to the Christian belief that Jesus Christ rose from the dead). "Living Jingo" refers to a legend attached to St. Gengulphus (Jingo for short) that after his martyrdom by being hacked to pieces, the pieces animated and hopped out to accuse his murderer. A version of the story appears in the Ingoldsby Legends.

The form "by Gingo!" is also recorded in the 18th century.

The expression "hey Jingo"/"hey Yingo" was also known in the vocabulary of illusionists and jugglers as a cue for magic appearance of objects (cf. "abracadabra"). Martim de Albuquerque in his 1881 "Notes and Queries" mentions a 1679 printed usage of the expression.

Origins have also been claimed for it in languages that would not have been very familiar in the British pub: in Basque, for example, Jainko or Jinko is a form of the word for "God". A claim that the term referred to Empress Jingū has been entirely dismissed.

The chorus of an 1878 song by G. H. MacDermott (singer) and George William Hunt (songwriter) commonly sung in pubs and music halls of the Victorian era gave birth to the term "jingoism". The song was written in response to the surrender of Plevna to Russia during the Russo-Turkish War, by which the road to Constantinople was open. The previous year, Viscount Sherbrooke had applied the expression, then a popular schoolboy's oath, to the war excitement. The song's lyrics had the chorus:

We don't want to fight but by Jingo if we do,
We've got the ships, we've got the men, we've got the money too,
We've fought the Bear before, and while we're Britons true,
The Russians shall not have Constantinople.

The expression is used by the antagonist Carruthers in Arthur Conan Doyle's 1903 Sherlock Holmes short story The Adventure of the Solitary Cyclist, as well as the 1984 TV adaptation by Granada of that same story.

Albert Von Tilzer's 1919 novelty song Oh By Jingo! was one of the biggest hits of the Tin Pan Alley era.

The 1970 song "After All" by David Bowie, from the album The Man Who Sold the World, also makes prominent use of the expression "Oh by Jingo". The original US release of the album additionally features the phrase on the back cover, spoken by a group of dancers.

In Chapter 6 of The Call of the Wild (1903), Jack London uses a dialectic form of the phrase "Py Jingo!" to describe Buck.

The phrase also appears in Chapter 16 of Robert Louis Stevenson's The Wrong Box when John recognizes his Uncle Joseph whom he had believed to be dead.

When Benito Mussolini was threatening to invade Abyssinia in 1935, the British comic magazine Punch published a parody:

We don't want you to fight but by Jingo if you do,
We will probably issue a joint memorandum suggesting a mild disapproval of you.

Terry Pratchett directly references the original song in his Discworld book Jingo:

We have no ships. We have no men. We have no money, too.
