= Swordfishtrombones =

Studio album by Tom Waits
- Released: September 1, 1983
- Recorded: August 1982
- Studios: Sunset Sound, Hollywood, California
- Genre: Experimental rock
- Length: 41:41
- Label: Island
- Producer: Tom Waits

Tom Waits chronology
One from the Heart (1982)	Swordfishtrombones (1983)	Anthology of Tom Waits (1985)

Singles from Swordfishtrombones
- 1. "In the Neighborhood" Released: October 1983

Swordfishtrombones is the eighth studio album by American singer-songwriter Tom Waits, released in 1983 on Island Records. It was the first of his albums that Waits produced on his own. Stylistically different from his previous albums, Swordfishtrombones moves away from conventional piano-based songwriting towards unusual instrumentation and a somewhat more abstract and experimental rock approach. The album peaked at No. 167 on the Billboard Pop Albums and 200 albums charts.

It is often considered the first in a loose trilogy that includes Rain Dogs and Franks Wild Years. According to The Guardian, "These are records of startling originality and playfulness, of cacophonous discord and sudden heartbreaking melody, in which it seemed the artist was trying to incorporate the whole history of American song into his loose-limbed poetic storytelling."

== Background ==
By the early 1980s, after finishing the One from the Heart soundtrack and parting ways with both his long-time producer Bones Howe and manager Herb Cohen, Waits was determined to break from the sound of his earlier records. His marriage to Kathleen Brennan proved pivotal: she introduced him to new avant-garde influences such as Captain Beefheart and Harry Partch and encouraged a more radical approach to songwriting. Waits wrote the material for Swordfishtrombones during a two-week trip to Ireland and produced the album himself at Sunset Sound, marking a major stylistic shift in his career.

The album marks the beginning of Waits's eclectic use of instruments. As he put it in a contemporary interview: "Some of the stuff I think is a bit of a departure for me. The instrumentation is all different, and no saxophones. I used the banjo, accordion, bass-marimba, metal aunglongs, you know, African squeeze drum, a calliope, a harmonium. So some of the stuff is a little more exotic."

Swordfishtrombones also represented a lyrical departure. According to AllMusic,

Lyrically, Waits' tales of the drunken and the lovelorn have been replaced by surreal accounts of people who burned down their homes and of Australian towns bypassed by the railroad -- a world (not just a neighborhood) of misfits now have his attention. The music can be primitive, moving to odd time signatures, while Waits alternately howls and wheezes in his gravelly bass voice. He seems to have moved on from Hoagy Carmichael and Louis Armstrong to Kurt Weill and Howlin' Wolf (as impersonated by Captain Beefheart).

== Artwork ==
The cover art is a TinTone photograph by Michael A. Russ showing Waits with the actors Angelo Rossitto and Lee Kolima.

== Reception ==
Professional ratings
Review scores
Source	Rating
AllMusic	5/5 stars
Blender	5/5 stars
Houston Chronicle	4/4 stars
Mojo	5/5 stars
Q	5/5 stars
Rolling Stone	4/5 stars
The Rolling Stone Album Guide	4.5/5 stars
Select	5/5
Uncut	5/5 stars
The Village Voice	A−

Swordfishtrombones has received widespread acclaim from music critics. CMJ called the album "nothing short of a modem American masterpiece." Billboard said it was Waits' "most varied, eclectic album yet" and that its "15 tracks may find a hard sell at radio, but aficionados will rejoice." Cashbox believed that the album could "undoubtedly be considered his best and most accessible album since the landmark Small Change from the late 1970s." NME ranked Swordfishtrombones the second best album of 1983.

Retrospective acclaim included Spin naming Swordfishtrombones the second greatest album of all time in 1989. Pitchfork ranked the album at number 11 in its 2002 list of the best albums of the 1980s. In 2006, Q listed it as the 36th best album of the 1980s, while in 2012, Slant Magazine listed it as the decade's 26th best album. In 2000, it was voted number 374 in Colin Larkin's All Time Top 1000 Albums. Elvis Costello included Swordfishtrombones on his list of essential albums, highlighting "16 Shells From a Thirty-Ought-Six" and "In the Neighborhood".

== Track listing ==
All tracks written by Tom Waits.

Side one

1. "Underground" – 1:58
2. "Shore Leave" – 4:12
3. "Dave the Butcher" (instrumental) – 2:15
4. "Johnsburg, Illinois" – 1:30
5. "16 Shells From a Thirty-Ought-Six" – 4:30
6. "Town with No Cheer" – 4:22
7. "In the Neighborhood" – 3:04

Side two

1. "Just Another Sucker on the Vine" (instrumental) – 1:42
2. "Frank's Wild Years" – 1:50
3. "Swordfishtrombone" – 3:00
4. "Down, Down, Down" – 2:10
5. "Soldier's Things" – 3:15
6. "Gin Soaked Boy" – 2:20
7. "Trouble's Braids" – 1:18
8. "Rainbirds" (instrumental) – 3:05

== Personnel ==
- Tom Waits – vocals (1:1–2, 1:4–7, 2:2–7), chair (1:2), Hammond B-3 organ (1:3), piano (1:4, 2:5, 2:8), harmonium (1:6, 2:1), synthesizer (1:6), freedom bell (1:6)
- Victor Feldman – bass marimba (1:1–2), marimba (1:2, 2:3), shaker (1:2), bass drum with rice (1:2), bass boo bams (1:3), Brake drum (1:5), bell plate (1:5), snare (1:5, 2:4), Hammond B-3 organ (1:7), snare drum (1:7), bells (1:7), conga (2:3), bass drum (2:3), Dabuki drum (2:3), tambourine (2:4), African talking drum (2:7)
- Larry Taylor – acoustic bass (1:1–2, 1:5, 1:7, 2:2, 2:4, 2:6–7), electric bass (2:3)
- Randy Aldcroft – baritone horn (1:1, 1:7), trombone (1:2)
- Stephen Taylor Arvizu Hodges – drums (1:1–2, 1:5, 2:4, 2:6), parade drum (1:7), cymbals (1:7), parade bass drum (2:7), glass harmonica (2:8)
- Fred Tackett – electric guitar (1:1, 1:2, 1:5, 2:6), banjo (1:2)
- Francis Thumm – metal aunglongs (1:2), glass harmonica (2:8)
- Greg Cohen – bass (1:4), acoustic bass (2:3, 2:5, 2:8)
- Joe Romano – trombone (1:5), trumpet (2:1)
- Anthony Clark Stewart – bagpipes (1:6)
- Clark Spangler – synthesizer program (1:6)
- Bill Reichenbach Jr. – trombone (1:7)
- Dick Hyde – trombone (1:7)
- Ronnie Barron – Hammond organ (2:2)
- Eric Bikales – organ (2:4)
- Carlos Guitarlos – electric guitar (2:4)
- Richard Gibbs – glass harmonica (2:8)
- Recorded by Tim Boyle and Biff Dawes.
- Mixed by Dawes at Sunset Sound Studios, Hollywood, CA.

== Charts ==
Chart (1983)	Peak position
Dutch Top 100	48
UK Albums Chart	62
US Billboard 200	167
Chart (1984)	Peak position
New Zealand RIANZ Albums Chart	45
Norwegian Albums Chart	18

== Certifications ==
Region	Certification	Certified units/sales
United Kingdom (BPI)	Silver	60,000^{^}
^{^} Shipments figures based on certification alone.

== Usage in media ==
Mike, Tom, and Crow sing "Underground" on Wanda's arrival in Atlantis in the 1993 Mystery Science Theater 3000 episode "Alien from L.A.". The song was used for the Chop Shop theme in the 2005 movie Robots.

"Soldier's Things" was covered by Paul Young on his 1985 album The Secret of Association, and is used in the 2005 movie Jarhead.
