= Jockey Full of Bourbon =

Single by Tom Waits

from the album Rain Dogs
- Released: 1985
- Genre: Experimental rock, mambo
- Length: 2:45
- Label: Island
- Songwriter: Tom Waits
- Producer: Tom Waits

Tom Waits singles chronology
"In the Neighborhood" (1983)	"Jockey Full of Bourbon" (1985)	"Hang Down Your Head" (1985)

"Jockey Full of Bourbon" is a song by Tom Waits released as the first single from his 1985 album Rain Dogs. It is featured in the films Down By Law (1986) and Things to Do in Denver When You're Dead (1995).

== Personnel ==
- Tom Waits - guitar, vocals
- Stephen Arvizu Taylor Hodges - drums
- Larry Taylor - double bass
- Michael Blair - percussion, conga
- Marc Ribot - guitar
- Ralph Carney - bass sax

== Cover versions ==
"Jockey Full of Bourbon" has been covered by performers including Joe Bonamassa (on his 2009 album The Ballad of John Henry), John P. Hammond, (on his 2001 album Wicked Grin), Moxy Früvous (on their album Live Noise), Moshav (on their album Misplaced), Los Lobos, Youn Sun Nah, Diana Krall, The Blue Hawaiians, Tim Timebomb, Miljoonasade, the Baltimore originated - progressive rock band "Octaves", and the greek country-blues-folk band Dead March on their 2017 debut album "Stolen Chants to Have a Chance".
