= Hang Down Your Head =

Single by Tom Waits

Single by Tom Waits

from the album Rain Dogs
- B-side: "Tango Till They're Sore"
- Released: 1985
- Recorded: 1985 at RCA Studios, NYC
- Genre: Folk rock
- Length: 2:32
- Label: Island
- Songwriter(s): Kathleen Brennan, Tom Waits
- Producer(s): Tom Waits

Tom Waits singles chronology
"Jockey Full of Bourbon" (1985)	"Hang Down Your Head" (1985)	"Downtown Train" (1985)

"Hang Down Your Head" is a song by Tom Waits appearing on his 1985 album Rain Dogs and released as a single that year by Island Records. It is in the same vein as Tom Waits' earlier work, featuring a more conventional melodic structure compared to other songs on Rain Dogs, albeit featuring an idiosyncratic arrangement. Allmusic critic Stewart Mason called the song "among the most direct and effective things Waits has ever written."

== Cover versions ==
Lucinda Williams recorded a version of the song for the soundtrack of the crime/drama series Crossing Jordan, released in 2003. It was later appended as a bonus track on the vinyl release of her 2003 album World Without Tears. Gothic rock ensemble Human Drama recorded the song for their covers' album Pinups, which was intended as a tribute to the various artists that had influenced them. Country artist Jack Ingram has played the song at live concerts, and his version was recorded for his live debut Live at Adair's in 1995.

== Formats and track listing ==
UK 7" single (107 761-100)

1. "Hang Down Your Head" – 2:32
2. "Tango Till They're Sore" – 2:49

== Personnel ==
Adapted from the Hang Down Your Head liner notes.

- Tom Waits – vocals, guitar, pump organ, production

Musicians

- Michael Blair – drums, percussion
- Larry Taylor – double bass
- Marc Ribot – guitar

Production and additional personnel

- Dennis Ferrante – recording
- Tom Gonzales – recording
- Robert Musso – engineering, mixing
- Howie Weinberg – mastering

== Release history ==
Region	Date	Label	Format	Catalog
Germany	1985	Island	LP	107 761-100
