= 16 Shells From a Thirty-Ought-Six =

Single by Tom Waits

from the album Big Time
- B-side: "Big Black Mariah"
- Released: 1988
- Recorded: August 1982 at Sunset Sound, Hollywood, CA
- Genre: Experimental rock; blues rock
- Length: 4:10
- Label: Island
- Songwriter: Tom Waits
- Producer: Tom Waits

Tom Waits singles chronology
"Hang On St. Christopher" (1987)	"16 Shells From a Thirty-Ought-Six" (1988)	"Goin' Out West" (1992)

"16 Shells From a Thirty-Ought-Six" is a song by Tom Waits appearing on his 1983 album Swordfishtrombones. In 1988, it was released as a single in support of his live performance album Big Time. The title refers to the .30-06 Springfield caliber.

It was also recorded by Bob Seger on his album It's a Mystery.

== Accolades ==
Year	Publication	Country	Article	Rank
2000	Vanity Fair	United Kingdom	Costello's 500	*
2010	Rolling Stone	Germany	The 50 Best Songs of the 1980s	*
2011	1001 Songs	Australia		*

(*) designates unordered lists.

== Formats and track listing ==
All songs written by Tom Waits.

UK 7" single (IS 370)

1. "16 Shells From a Thirty-Ought-Six" – 4:10
2. "Big Black Mariah" – 2:41

UK 12" single (12 IS 370)

1. "16 Shells From a Thirty-Ought-Six" – 4:10
2. "Big Black Mariah" – 2:41
3. "Ruby's Arms" – 4:44

== Personnel ==
Adapted from the 16 Shells From a Thirty-Ought-Six liner notes.

- Tom Waits – vocals, production

=== Musicians ===
- Victor Feldman – brake drum, bell plate, snare
- Stephen Hodges – drums
- Larry Taylor – acoustic bass
- Fred Tackett – electric guitar
- Joe Romano – trombone

=== Production and additional personnel ===
- Biff Dawes – recording, mixing
- Daniel Hainey – photography

== Release history ==
Region	Date	Label	Format	Catalog
United Kingdom	1988	Island	LP	IS 370
