= G. W. Hunt =

English songwriter (died 1904)

- Born: George William Hunt c. 1837; Finsbury, London, England
- Died: 1 March 1904 (aged 66) Brentwood, Essex, England
- Genre: Music hall
- Occupation: Songwriter
- Instruments: Piano, harmonium
- Years active: 1860s-1890s

George William Hunt (c.1837 – 1 March 1904), known in later life as 'Jingo' Hunt, was an English writer of music hall songs, best known for "MacDermott's War Song" also known as the "Jingo Song".

== Biography ==
He was born in Finsbury, London, and taught himself to play piano and harmonium as a child. He spent some time in South Africa before returning to England, where at one time he was the manager of the Canterbury Music Hall on Westminster Bridge Road. He started to write songs for music hall performers, and was one of the first to write both words and music - previously words had usually been written to fit existing tunes. His first success came with "The Organ Grinder", sung by George Leybourne and by Arthur Lloyd; and was soon followed by "Poor Old Uncle Sam", a Civil War song successfully performed by Scottish singer Tom MacLagan, and "The German Band", sung by Lloyd.

He developed a partnership with lion comique George Leybourne, with Hunt regularly visiting Leybourne's house and playing tunes on the harmonium until Leybourne, lying in bed upstairs, shouted out that he liked one of the tunes. Hunt wrote over 50 songs performed by Leybourne, including "Awfully Clever", "Up in a Balloon", and "Don't Make a Noise Or Else You'll Wake the Baby". He also wrote songs for many of the other popular performers of the period, including Alfred Vance, Herbert Campbell, Jenny Hill, Annie Adams, and Fred French. In all, it was estimated that he wrote some 7,000 songs, and it was later said of him that "his faculty for rhyming was as strong as his gift of melody.. for long he had no rival" as a songwriter. His fellow songwriter Felix McGlennon described Hunt as "the originator of the modern comic song for, breaking away from the worn-out methods, he composed new tunes to all the songs he wrote, his melodies being so catchy that many of them have achieved a world-wide popularity."

Hunt's most successful and lasting song, G. H. MacDermott's "War Song", best known for its chorus of "We don't want to fight, But by Jingo if we do...", was written in 1877 at the time of the Great Eastern Crisis and the threat of all-out war between Russia and Turkey. After initially rejecting the song, MacDermott changed his mind and bought the song from Hunt for five pounds. Some years later, Hunt said:

My breakfast was half an hour late that morning, so I sat down and wrote the whole chorus. After breakfast I wrote the verses and the melody. The whole thing was the work of barely four hours. I sent the song to MacDermott because he seemed to me to have just the voice and style to make It go. Ten days later he sang it from the stage of the old Pavilion in Piccadilly Circus. From that moment he was a made man. I didn't do so badly out of the song, either. Altogether, with fees, royalties, and other charges, I netted some £750. Not bad for just on four hours' work...

The popularity of the song had an immediate and direct effect on national policy, catching the national mood of the moment; its words were quoted in the House of Commons, and the word "jingoism" entered the vocabulary. Hunt also wrote "Charlie Dilke Upset the Milk", sung in 1885 by Fred Gilbert and satirising Sir Charles Dilke, a Liberal politician involved in a scandalous divorce case.

Hunt wrote music for ballets and the theatre, including the musical burlesque Monte Cristo Jr. (1886). He was also one of the organisers of the Music Hall Sick Fund Provident Society, to support performers. He argued against copyright theft, becoming involved in several court actions and claiming that his songs "have been republished in the United States for the last 12 years under anybody’s name but mine." He was also a successful painter. In later years he reportedly "fell on evil times", and a testimonial was held on his behalf in 1901, supported by such leading figures as Herbert Campbell, Arthur Collins, and Dan Leno.

He died in 1904 after a short stay in the Essex County Asylum in Brentwood. He was buried at Abney Park Cemetery. His gravestone was restored in 2012.
