= She Shook Me Cold =

Song by David Bowie

from the album The Man Who Sold the World
- Released: November 4, 1970 (US); April 1971 (UK)
- Recorded: 18 April – 22 May 1970
- Studio: Trident and Advision, London
- Genre: Heavy metal
- Length: 4:13
- Label: Mercury
- Songwriter: David Bowie
- Producer: Tony Visconti

"She Shook Me Cold" is a song written by the English singer-songwriter David Bowie in 1970 for the album The Man Who Sold the World. Mick Ronson's solo guitar is influenced by hard rock as played by Cream, Led Zeppelin and Jeff Beck. Although solely credited to Bowie, this and other songs from the album were constructed around jams by all of the musicians. Tony Visconti, who played bass on the track in addition to producing the entire album, was quoted as saying, "The songs were written by all four of us. We'd jam in a basement, and Bowie would just say whether he liked them or not."

== Song details ==
The working title of this track was "Suck". Its title bears a resemblance to the Muddy Waters song "You Shook Me," which was recorded by Jeff Beck for the then recent album Truth.

The lyrics are from the perspective of a man recounting a sexual encounter with a woman, with frequent references to oral sex. The band was deliberately recorded to sound as "fat" as possible, to be able to play the song live without disappointing.

Reviewing The Man Who Sold the World in 2016, Rolling Stone's Douglas Wolk described "She Shook Me Cold" as "straight-up heavy-metal".

== Cover versions ==
- Skin Yard – Skin Yard (1986)
- Pain Teens – Born in Blood (1990)

== Personnel ==
According to biographer Chris O'Leary:

- David Bowie – lead vocal
- Mick Ronson – lead guitar
- Tony Visconti – bass
- Mick Woodmansey – drums

Technical

- Tony Visconti – producer
- Ken Scott – engineer
- Gerald Chevin – engineer
