= Jingoism =

Nationalism in the form of aggressive foreign policy

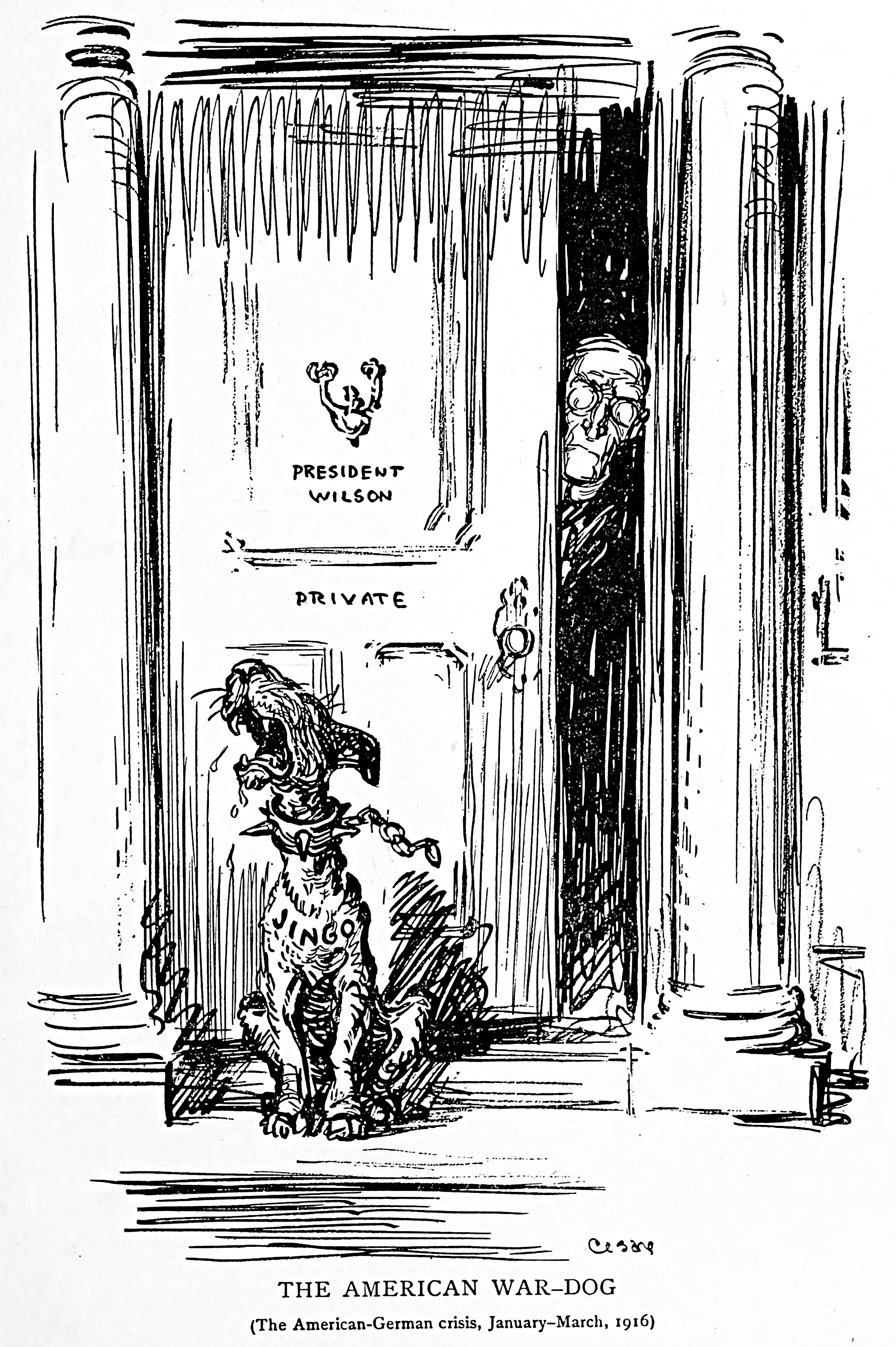
The American War-Dog, a 1916 political cartoon by Oscar Cesare, with the dog named "Jingo"

Jingoism is nationalism and conservatism in the form of aggressive and proactive foreign policy, such as a country's advocacy for the use of threats or actual force, as opposed to peaceful relations, in efforts to safeguard what it perceives as its national interests. Colloquially, jingoism is excessive bias in judging one's own country as superior to others – an extreme type of nationalism (see chauvinism and ultranationalism).

== Etymology ==
The chorus of a song by the songwriter G. W. Hunt, popularized by the singer G. H. MacDermott – which was commonly sung in British pubs and music halls around the time of the Russo-Turkish War of 1877–78 – gave birth to the term. The lyrics included this chorus:

We don't want to fight, but by Jingo if we do,
We've got the ships, we've got the men, we've got the money too.
The Rooshun bear we've thrashed before, and while we're Britons true,
The Rooshuns shall not have Constantinople.

The capture of Constantinople was a long-standing Russian strategic aim, since it would have given the Russian Navy, based in the Black Sea, unfettered access to the Mediterranean Sea through the Bosphorus and the Dardanelles (known as the "Turkish Straits"); conversely, the British were determined to block the Russians, in order to protect their own access to trade routes. At the time when the above song was composed and sung, the Russians were nearing their goal, through the Treaty of San Stefano; eventually, the British were able to push the Russians back by means of diplomatic pressure and the threat of war.

The phrase "by Jingo" was a minced oath, scarcely documented in writing, used in place of "by Jesus". The term may derive from the Basque Jinkoa, "God".

Use of the specific term jingoism stems from its coinage by prominent British radical George Holyoake, as a political label, in a letter to the Daily News on 13 March 1878.

== Examples ==
In the 1880s, Henry Hyndman, leader of the Social Democratic Federation, turned against internationalism and promoted a version of socialism mixed with nationalism and antisemitism, even to the point of attacking fellow socialist Eleanor Marx in antisemitic terms, noting that she had "inherited in her nose and mouth the Jewish type from Karl Marx himself". When taking part in the breakaway group which founded the Socialist League, Eleanor Marx wrote polemics in which she characterized Hyndman and his followers as "The Jingo Party".

British artillery major-general Thomas Bland Strange, one of the founders of the Canadian Army and one of the divisional commanders during the 1885 North-West Rebellion, was an eccentric and temperamental soldier who gained the nickname "Jingo Strange" and titled his 1893 autobiography Gunner Jingo's Jubilee.

Probably the first uses of the term in the U.S. press occurred in connection with the proposed annexation of Hawaii in 1893, after a coup led by foreign residents, mostly Americans, and assisted by the U.S. minister in Hawaii, overthrew the constitutional monarchy and declared a republic. Republican president Benjamin Harrison and Republicans in the U.S. Senate were frequently accused of jingoism in the Democratic press for supporting annexation.

Theodore Roosevelt was frequently accused of jingoism. In an article on 23 October 1895 in The New York Times, Roosevelt stated: "There is much talk about 'jingoism'. If by 'jingoism' they mean a policy in pursuance of which Americans will with resolution and common sense insist upon our rights being respected by foreign powers, then we are 'jingoes'." Donald Trump's speeches are also often described as jingoist from his critics.

In Homage to Catalonia, George Orwell decries the tactics of political journalists and wishes for the introduction of aeroplanes into war in order to finally see "a jingo with a bullet hole in him".

The policy of appeasement toward Hitler led to satirical references to the disappearance of such jingoistic attitudes when facing German aggression. A cartoon by E. H. Shepard titled "The Old-Fashioned Customer" appeared on the 28 March 1938 issue of Punch. Set in a record shop, John Bull asks the record seller (Prime Minister Neville Chamberlain): "I wonder if you've got a song I remember about not wanting to fight, but if we do [...] something, something, something [...] we've got the money too?". On the wall is a portrait of Lord Salisbury.

The rhetoric of North Korea has been described as jingoist.

== See also ==
- Colonel Blimp
- Diplomacy
- Militarism
- Rejoice (Margaret Thatcher)
- War hawk
