= Michael A. Russ =

American photographer (1945–2021)

Michael Andreas Russ
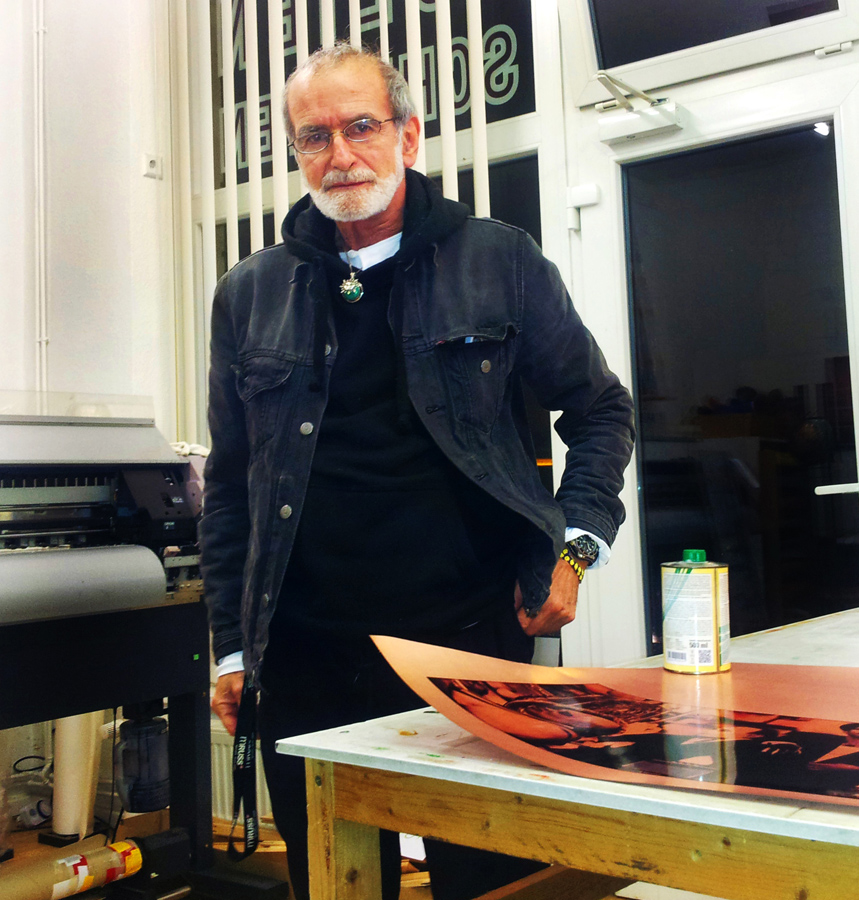
- Self portrait photo Michael A. Russ
- Born: January 1945; Berlin, Germany
- Died: September 27, 2021 (aged 73); Berlin, Germany
- Known for: Erotic photography, Fine art photography, Film
- Notable work: Art Direction Magazine cover May 1973. 1983: Tom Waits album cover Swordfishtrombones. Assoc. Director and choreographer for the MTV music video of the song "In the neighborhood"
- Website: tintones.com

Michael Andreas Russ (January 1945 – September 27, 2021) was an American photographer, photo designer and film director. In reference to his artistic cooperation on the Swordfishtrombones album cover production, singer Tom Waits commented on Russ' work: "His approach to photography is with the eyes of a painter working with light. This technique is what drew me to Michael’s work in the beginning".

Russ' career as a photographer began in New York in the late 1960s, where he photographed his fellow acting students. Self-taught, he evolved his own style: "The grainy picture appearing horizontally in subtle motion as though it came of the silver screen". A black and white photograph by Russ, inspired by an Ingmar Bergman film, was published on the cover of Art Direction, The Magazine of Visual Communication with a Gertrude Stein quotation: "The composition in which we live makes the art which we see and hear". He eventually moved to his own studio off Union Square, Manhattan and connected with the local underground art scene. In his early years Russ focused on men's fashion magazines and erotic sequential photographic scenes for Playboy Press books. He soon experimented with distinctive photographic techniques, turning 35mm black and white film into chemically toned, masked, solarized and hand-colored, "one of a kind" silver gelatin prints. These "TinTones", as Russ would call them, were to become the trademark of his work. They were published in popular fashion and lifestyle magazines and brought him international recognition among peers in the art world. Michael Russ' "Prussian Blue" TinTone photo exhibition at the Los Angeles China Club was the basis for the artistic collaboration with Tom Waits, who commissioned Russ for the cover photograph for the album Swordfishtrombones.

== Early years – life and work in the 1960s and '70s ==
Russ moved from Berlin, Germany to the US in 1958 after his father's death to rejoin his mother. They resided in Denver, Colorado. While still in high school he took ballet (Lillian Cushing School of Ballet) and acting lessons and performed locally. On his 17th birthday he enlisted in the US army and spent two and a half years stationed in Bamberg, Germany. After his discharge he moved to New York City in 1965, where he attended Renate Mannhardt acting workshop and began taking pictures of his fellow acting students. Wilhelmina Cooper of Wilhelmina Models encouraged him to pursue a career in fashion photography. She sent him models on Go-Sees for test shoots and thus helped him to make his entry into fashion photography.

In 1970 he moved into his own studio off Union Square, right around the corner from Andy Warhol and The Factory, frequenting Max's Kansas City, a favorite hang-out for Warhol and his friends as well as upcoming musical legends like David Bowie, Janis Joplin, Jimi Hendrix or The Velvet Underground. By the early seventies Russ' work had been published with major fashion and lifestyle magazines like Mens Wear, Esquire, GQ, and True Magazine, and he contributed erotic fantasy images to three Playboy Press books: Love Games, Sexy Ladies and Ecstasy.

== Developing a unique photographic approach ==
In 1976 Michael Russ moved to Paris and continued artistically manipulating his silver gelatin prints, adding hand coloring, masking, and solarization to his black and white, or chemically toned images. Applying these photographic techniques lends a painterly aspect to the grainy black and white images as though they come off the silver screen. This displayed a personal distinctive style, characteristic for his work. By Russ' own accord, his grasp of paintings developed early on through the work of German expressionists like Ludwig Kirchner, Max Beckmann and Otto Dix. In his treatment of color, he especially admired Marc Chagall. His work was published in major fashion, lifestyle and avant-garde magazines GUNNARS, Mode International, Mode Avant Guarde, PHOTO Magazine, and Zoom (photography magazine), as well as German Playboy, Photo Reporter and cover art to IL Magazine. He also contributed sequential "sujets de chambre" to Vogue magazine. His erotic postcard edition "The Compagnie" became part of the permanent collection of the Musée des arts décoratifs de Paris, an annex to the Louvre museum.

The post-productive darkroom work was part to the graphic picture sequence. He incorporated the perforation of 35mm film and visual soundtracks to resemble snippets of motion picture film. Results of these experiments were published as a sequence in Vogue Hommes under the title "L' initiative au feminine" using fashion as accessories. A portfolio "Michael Russ ou la beaute du grain" was published in Vogue Hommes in November 1980. He was also the artistic consultant to François Mimet's feature film Mme. Claude II (US title: Intimate Moments), from Accord Productions in 1981.

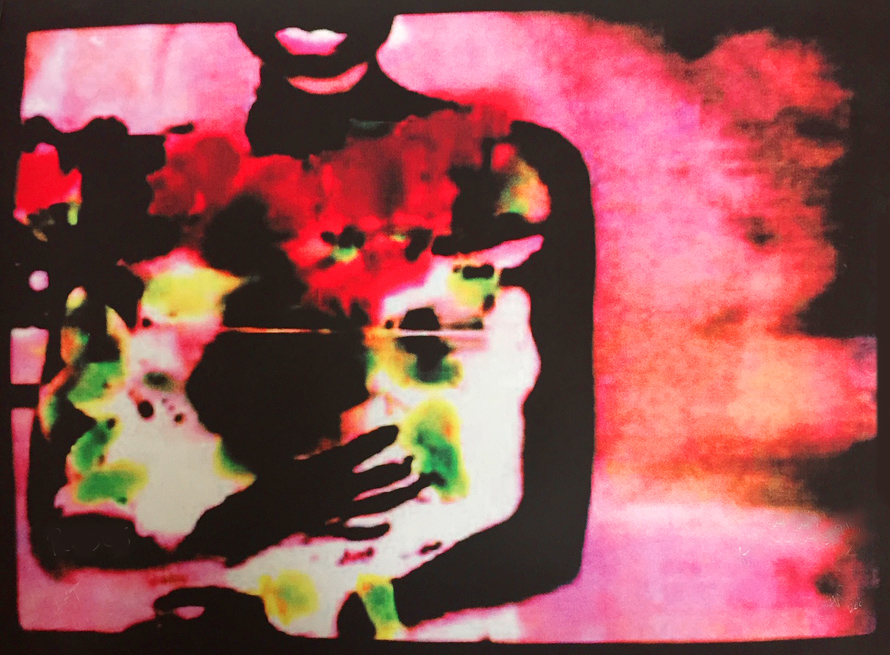
TinTone artwork by Michael A. Russ. Handcolored silver gelatine print

== Later years - from the '80s to his death ==
In 1981 Michael relocated to Los Angeles. There he photographed actors and celebrities for the L.A. Times and L.A. Weekly, but mainly focused on exhibiting his TinTones in large format. His "Prussian Blue" exhibition at the original China Club in 1983 caught the attention of Tom Waits and Kathleen Brennan, Tom's wife. Waits commissioned Russ to create the cover of his new Island-label record Swordfishtrombones with a photograph in the TinTone style, featuring himself, Lee Kolima, the strong man and Angelo Rossitto (the mayor of Hollywood). Angelo also premiered in Tod Browning's 1932 classic Freaks, which "inspired the album's iconic mutant cover art by Michael A. Russ". Russ then became associate director and choreographer on the music video to the song "In the Neighborhood" from that album for MTV, closely working with director Haskell Wexler.

He kept refining his TinTone techniques by creating images using various materials in limited editions and he has exhibited in the US, Europe and Asia.

Wear magazine commissioned him for a showcase entitled "Nella villa di Tamara", in the "TinTone" style of the Canadian theater production TAMARA, which had a ten-year run at the American Legion.

From 1986 to 1995 Russ returned to Germany and focused on fine art photographic work, perfecting his TinTone variations. These were published as portfolios and on the covers of renowned trade and photographic magazines: Photo Technik International, Color Foto, Playgirl, ZOOM, NewMag, and Das Magazin. In 1992 he worked on a special Fine Art sequence on Robert Wilson's The Black Rider at the Thalia Theater (Hamburg). In 1995 he resettled in Los Angeles, where he was showcased in Larry Flynt's experimental RAGE Magazine, Larry Flynt Publications (LFP), featuring a 12-foot python act at the Opium Den. Eroticism, beauty and the allure of the female body is the subject matter of much of Michael Russ' photography. Despite working for the fashion industry and glamour magazines, Russ' photography preserved a raw and edgy aspect and a distinct artistic quality far from glossy surfaces and the idea of a "perfect picture". He directed Samantha Fox' comeback video "The reason is you" for Basilea Film Zürich, which was shown on music TV channels MTV and VIVA. In Santa Fe (New Mexico), where he settled from 1998 to 2000, Russ exhibited large-format TinTone Iris Gicle prints at the Paramount and at Fullers Lodge in Los Alamos. Basler Magazin (Switzerland) published a portfolio (Prussian Blue).

In 2001 Russ returned to Berlin and since then commuted between the continents (Berlin, New York, Los Angeles), working and exhibiting internationally. Playboy magazine (Germany) and Fine Art Photo magazine published showcases and biographical portraits. In 2007 Russ first introduced and exhibited limited editions of large-scale Silver/Industrial TinTones in Berlin, for which he received critical acclaim. A critic of major German newspaper Die Welt compared his erotic photography to the work of Helmut Newton (having shared some of his photographic models in the late 1970s) and highlighted his creative use of color and layering techniques in his TinTones. In 2012 he had an exhibition with his TinTones in Seoul, Republic of Korea. In 2013 Russ' large-scale TinTone Industrials were featured at the Berlin Fotofestival The Browse.

== Exhibitions ==
- 1980: Musee des Arts Decoratifs (Louvre Annex, Paris). "Postcard edition The Compagnie".
- 1983: China Club, Los Angeles. "Prussian Blue". Large format R prints.
- 1998: L.A. Gallery, Los Angeles. Group exhibition.
- 1999: The Image House, Santa Fe N.M. "Iris Giclee Prints".
- 2000: Fullers Lodge, Los Alamos N.M. "Iris Giclee Prints", group exhibition.
- 2000: The Paramount, Santa Fe N.M. "TinTones".
- 2003: Soho Gallery, Los Angeles, "Iris Giclee Prints and silver gelatine -"TinTones", group exhibition.
- 2007: Fine Arts-Con.Tra Salongalerie, Berlin. "TinTones", large format AluDiBonds/Silver/Industrial.
- 2007: Galerie Nadania Idriss, Berlin. "TinTones", large format AluDiBonds/Silver/Industrial.
- 2008: Art Center Berlin. "TinTones", large format AluDiBonds/Silver/Industrial.
- 2009: Galerie Lucas Carrieri (Berlin). "TinTones", large format AluDiBonds/Silver/Industrial.
- 2011: Art Center Berlin. "TinTones. Rough Print", large format AluDiBonds/Silver/Industrial.
- 2012: Art Place Seoul, South Corea. "TinTones. Rough Print", large format Lambda Prints.
- 2013: Retrospektive: Fotografien von Michael A. Russ, 1973 – 2013. "06:00 AM … positive/negatives…"
- 2013: Station Berlin, Berlin Fotofestival The Browse 2013. "TinTones", large format AluDiBonds/Silver/Industrial.
