= After All (David Bowie song) =

Song by David Bowie

from the album The Man Who Sold the World
- Released: 4 November 1970 (United States); April 1971 (UK)
- Recorded: 18 April – 22 May 1970
- Studio: Trident and Advision, London
- Genre: Folk rock
- Length: 3:52
- Label: Mercury
- Songwriter: David Bowie
- Producer: Tony Visconti

"After All" is a song written by the English singer-songwriter David Bowie in 1970 for his third studio album The Man Who Sold the World, released later that year in the United States and in April 1971 in the UK. One of a number of Bowie songs from the early 1970s reflecting the influence of Friedrich Nietzsche and Aleister Crowley, it has been described by biographer David Buckley as "the album's hidden gem", and by Nicholas Pegg as "one of Bowie's most underrated recordings".

== Music and lyrics ==
The song has been interpreted as taking to nightmarish conclusions the children's world of Bowie's early song "There Is a Happy Land", from his 1967 debut David Bowie. Like much of The Man Who Sold the World, its lyrics are imbued with a Nietzschian Übermensch philosophy ("Man is an obstacle, sad as the clown"). The line "Live til your rebirth and do what you will" is often cited as homage to occultist Aleister Crowley and his dictum, "Do what thou wilt".

The track is unusual in a rock context for being in waltz time, most obviously in the surreal circus-like instrumental break. Its style was inspired by the "slightly sinister, measured melancholy" of songs Bowie recalled from childhood such as Danny Kaye's "Inchworm". Regarding the music's arrangement, producer Tony Visconti said, "The basic song and the 'oh by jingo' line were David's ideas. The rest was Ronno and me vying for the next overdub."

== Legacy ==
As with "All the Madmen" from the same album, the gothic atmosphere of "After All" has been cited as a significant influence on such bands as Siouxsie and the Banshees, the Cure and Bauhaus.

== Personnel ==
According to biographer Chris O'Leary:

- David Bowie – lead vocal, 12-string acoustic guitar, Stylophone
- Mick Ronson – lead guitar, 12-string acoustic guitar, recorder
- Tony Visconti – bass, recorder
- Mick Woodmansey – drums
- Ralph Mace – Moog synthesiser

Technical

- Tony Visconti – producer
- Ken Scott – engineer
- Gerald Chevin – engineer

== Cover versions ==
- Human Drama – Pinups (1993)
- The Mission – Goth Oddity – A Tribute to David Bowie (1996)
- Ventilator – Crash Course for the Ravers – A Tribute to the Songs of David Bowie (1996)
- Tori Amos – Strange Little Girls (2001) (b-side from "Strange Little Girl" single)
- Billie Ray Martin – After All (2014) (EP including remixes by Mijk van Dijk and Caesar Gergess)
