= Time (Tom Waits song) =

1985 song by Tom Waits

Song by Tom Waits

from the album Rain Dogs
- Released: September 30, 1985
- Recorded: 1985
- Studio: RCA (New York City)
- Genre: Experimental rock
- Length: 3:55
- Label: Island
- Songwriter: Tom Waits
- Producer: Tom Waits

"Time" is a song by American singer-songwriter Tom Waits appearing on his ninth studio album Rain Dogs. It was written by Waits and was recorded in 1985 at RCA Studios in New York City.

It was covered by Tori Amos for her 2001 concept album Strange Little Girls. Amos made a notable appearance on the Late Show with David Letterman to perform the song; it was the first musical performance on the show after the September 11 attacks.

"Time" was covered again in 2019 by Rosanne Cash for Come On Up to the House: Women Sing Waits, a Tom Waits tribute album featuring female artists' covers of Waits' songs.

In June 2026, CBS News included the song in its list of the 250 essential American songs of the past 250 years.

== Accolades ==
Year	Publication	Country	Accolade	Rank
2000	Elvis Costello	United Kingdom	The Best Songs from the 500 Best Albums Ever	*
2011	Toby Creswell	Australia	1001 Songs	*
2014	Musikexpress	Germany	The 700 Best Songs of All Time	510

(*) designates unordered lists.

== Personnel ==
Adapted from the Rain Dogs liner notes.

- Tom Waits – vocals, guitar, production

Musicians

- William Shimmel – accordion
- Larry Taylor – double bass

Production and additional personnel

- Dennis Ferrante – recording
- Tom Gonzales – recording
- Robert Musso – engineering, mixing
- Howie Weinberg – mastering

== In popular culture ==
The song was used in "The Mother Box Origins" clip for 2021s Zack Snyder's Justice League.

The song was used in Gilmore Girls: A Year in the Life Winter Episode for a flashback of Richard Gilmore’s funeral.

== See also ==
- Tom Waits discography
