= Annie Adams (music hall) =

- Born: Ann Eliza Adams; 16 November 1843; Newport, Isle of Wight, England
- Died: 12 May 1905 (aged 61) London, England
- Genres: Music hall
- Occupation: Singer
- Years active: 1862–1881

Ann Eliza Adams (16 November 1843 – 12 May 1905) was an English singer who was one of the first female music hall stars.

== Biography ==
Annie Adams was born in Newport, Isle of Wight, the daughter of an innkeeper and hotel manager, and grew up in and around Southampton. She sang while working as a barmaid in her father's pubs, and gained a local reputation singing at theatres and concert rooms in the area. Her voice reportedly had such power that glasses shook on tables. She was signed by a talent agent, Ambrose Maynard, and made her first professional appearance in 1862 in Chatham, Kent. The same year, she married comic singer Harry Wall (real name Henry Whiting).

She made her debut in London at Weston's Music Hall, and also performed at the London Pavilion. Described as having "a big voice, big personality and big physique", she rapidly won a reputation for performing both ballads and comic songs, and was billed as 'Queen of the Serio-Comic Vocalists'. She was also noted for her extravagant dresses; when she left the stage, her husband would lift their hems to prevent them from getting dirty. She toured widely in Britain, reportedly playing at every music hall in the country. Her most popular songs included "The Merriest Girl That's Out" (1865) written by Charles Merion, and two written by G. W. Hunt, "Johnny the Engine Driver" (1867) and "When the Band Begins to Play" (1871).

In 1871, she started a two-year tour of the United States. She played at the Union Square Theatre in New York, followed by venues in Philadelphia, Pittsburgh, Boston, Buffalo, and San Francisco. In New York, she was called "the most original singer who ever appeared on the variety stage in America", and in Philadelphia she was "the centre of attraction".

After returning to Britain, she continued to tour until about 1881. She died in London in 1905, aged 61, following an operation and was buried with her husband on the east side of Highgate Cemetery. She was buried under her married name of Ann Eliza Wall (plot no.36044) and the grave has no headstone or marker.
