= Holy Holy (song) =

1971 song by David Bowie

Single by David Bowie
- B-side: "Black Country Rock"
- Released: 15 January 1971
- Recorded: 9, 13–16 November 1970
- Studio: Island (London)
- Genre: Glam rock, art rock
- Length: 3:13
- Label: Mercury
- Songwriter: David Bowie
- Producer: Blue Mink

David Bowie singles chronology
| "Memory of a Free Festival" (1970) | "Holy Holy" (1971) | "Changes" (1972) |

Alternative cover

"Holy Holy" is a song by the English singer-songwriter David Bowie, originally released as a single in January 1971. It was recorded in November 1970, after the completion of The Man Who Sold the World, in the perceived absence of a clear single from that album. Like Bowie's two previous singles, it sold poorly and failed to chart.

At the time Marc Bolan's Tyrannosaurus Rex was a significant source of inspiration for Bowie. On this track, according to NME editors Roy Carr and Charles Shaar Murray, "Bolan's influence is so much in the ascendant that it virtually amounts to a case of demonic possession". The single's B-side was another Tyrannosaurus Rex flavoured song called "Black Country Rock" from The Man Who Sold the World. Bowie performed "Holy Holy" on Britain's Granada Television wearing a dress, which he would also wear on the cover of the soon-to-be-released UK edition of The Man Who Sold the World.

A more energetic version of the song was recorded in late 1971 for The Rise and Fall of Ziggy Stardust and the Spiders from Mars. It was dropped from the album, but subsequently appeared as the B-side to "Diamond Dogs" in 1974. This version was also released as a bonus track on the Rykodisc reissue of The Man Who Sold the World in 1990 (despite the sleeve notes referring to it as the original cut), as well as on the Ziggy Stardust – 30th Anniversary Reissue bonus disc in 2002. Bowie himself vetoed the inclusion of the original at a late stage (in favour of the remake), and the single remained the only official release of the 1970 recording until 2015, when it was included on Re:Call 1, part of the Five Years (1969–1973) compilation.

== Track listing ==
All tracks written by David Bowie.

1971 Mercury single

1. "Holy Holy" – 3:13
2. "Black Country Rock" – 3:05

1974 RCA single

1. "Diamond Dogs" – 5:56
2. "Holy Holy" – 2:20

== Personnel ==
Credits according to biographer Chris O'Leary.

Original version

- David Bowie – vocals, acoustic guitar
- Alan Parker – lead guitar
- Herbie Flowers – bass, producer
- Barry Morgan – drums

Re-recorded version

- David Bowie – vocals
- Mick Ronson – lead and rhythm guitar
- Trevor Bolder – bass
- Woody Woodmansey – drums
- Ken Scott – producer
