= All the Madmen (song) =

Song by David Bowie

from the album The Man Who Sold the World
- Released: 4 November 1970
- Recorded: 18 April – 22 May 1970
- Studio: Trident and Advision, London
- Genre: Hard rock; psychedelic rock
- Length: 5:38
- Label: Mercury
- Songwriter: David Bowie
- Producer: Tony Visconti

Official audio
- "All the Madmen" (2015 Remaster) on YouTube

"All the Madmen" is a song by English singer-songwriter David Bowie, written in 1970 for his third studio album, The Man Who Sold the World, released later that year in the US and in April 1971 in the UK. As one of several tracks on the album about insanity, the song has been summarized as depicting "a world so bereft of reason that the last sane men are the ones in the asylums".

== Music and lyrics ==
The track opens with just vocals and acoustic guitar, with the second verse adding cymbals and recorder, creating an atmosphere that Bowie biographer David Buckley called "childlike dementia", before transforming into a heavy rocker featuring distorted chords from the electric guitar played by Mick Ronson, augmented by Moog synthesizer played by Ralph Mace. Later, Ronson plays melodic lead guitar, before a return to heavy riffing and then melodic lead guitar as the song concludes. "[A] mini-score for four recorders" which Ronson wrote was "used in the break of [the song]".

It ends with the chant "Zane zane zane, ouvre le chien", the latter phrase literally meaning "open the dog" in French. Tanja Stark, citing Bowie's well known interest in esoterica suggests the surrealist phrase "Zane, Zane, Zane", repeated by Bowie on the track "Buddha of Suburbia" is possibly "... a cryptic reference to the esoteric Sword of Zayin (zayin (זין) means "sword") a Kabbalah concept associated with the Mezla Lightning Flash of Creation that zigzags from station to station of the mystic Tree of Life conjuring a multitude of associations with Bowie, from Aladdin Sane's iconic 'zigzag' Lightning Flash to Bowie's zigzag drawing of the Tree of Life on the back cover of Station to Station".

The production of the song also made use of varispeed vocals, which Bowie had first employed – though only for comic effect – on "The Laughing Gnome" in 1967. Bowie has said that the song was written for and about his half brother, Terry Burns, who had schizophrenia and was an inmate of Cane Hill Hospital (pictured on the original U.S. cover of The Man Who Sold the World) until his suicide in 1985. The lyrics include references to lobotomy, the tranquilizer Librium and EST, or Electroshock Therapy.

== Release and aftermath ==
The second track on The Man Who Sold the World, "All the Madmen" was circulated to radio stations by Mercury Records, in edited form and in mono, as a promo single (featuring the same song on both sides) in the U.S. in December 1970, prior to Bowie's planned promotional tour there in early 1971. An official release, featuring "Janine" from his previous album David Bowie as the B-side, is thought to have been planned but shelved, and a handful of stock copies (73173) have been found. In June 1973, RCA Records, which had re-released the song's parent album the previous year, issued "All the Madmen" as a single in Eastern Europe, backed with "Soul Love" from The Rise and Fall of Ziggy Stardust and the Spiders from Mars.

Bowie performed the song live on his 1987 Glass Spider Tour, though it was not included on the video release from the concerts until the Special Edition release on DVD in 2007 (on which it was released as an audio-only track). Along with "After All", from the same album, "All the Madmen"'s "gothic melodrama" has been cited as a significant influence on such bands as Siouxsie and the Banshees, The Cure and Nine Inch Nails.

== Other releases ==
In addition to being released as a single in Eastern Europe in 1973, the song appeared on the Russian compilation Starman in 1989.

In 2015, the promo mono single edit of the song was officially released for the first time, on Re:Call 1, part of the Five Years (1969–1973) compilation. A 2020 stereo mix of the promo single version, by Tony Visconti, was released on the box set The Width of a Circle in 2021.

== Cover versions ==
- Alien Sex Fiend – on Goth Oddity – A Tribute to David Bowie (various artists, 1991), in a remix called "Padded Cell mix"
- Jeannie Lewis – Till Time Brings Change (1980)
- Max Lorentz – Kiss You in the Rain – Max Lorentz sings David Bowie (2011)

== Personnel ==
According to biographer Chris O'Leary:

- David Bowie – lead vocals, 12-string acoustic guitar
- Mick Ronson – lead and rhythm guitars, recorders
- Tony Visconti – bass, recorder, producer
- Woody Woodmansey – drums
- Ralph Mace – Moog synthesiser

Technical

- Tony Visconti – producer
- Ken Scott – engineer
- Gerald Chevin – engineer
