= Pinups (Human Drama album) =

Studio album by Human Drama
- Released: 1993
- Recorded: August – September 1992
- Label: Triple X

Human Drama chronology
The World Inside (1992)	Pinups (1993)	Human Drama (1994)

Professional ratings
Review scores
Source	Rating
Allmusic	4/5 stars

Pinups is an album by Human Drama. A tribute to various artists, including Joy Division, David Bowie, Lou Reed, Pink Floyd, Genesis, John Lennon and Leonard Cohen, it was released by Triple X in 1993. The cover photo imitates Pin Ups, Bowie's own covers album.

== Track listing ==
1. "Yesterday Is Here" (original by Tom Waits)
2. "Till the Next Goodbye" (original by the Rolling Stones)
3. "Wish You Were Here" (original by Pink Floyd)
4. "Love Will Tear Us Apart" (original by Joy Division)
5. "Caroline Says II" (original by Lou Reed)
6. "Oh My Love" (original by John Lennon)
7. "I'm Not Like Everybody Else" (original by the Kinks)
8. "Afraid" (original by Nico)
9. "Hang Down Your Head" (original by Tom Waits)
10. "Decades" (original by Joy Division)
11. "The Carpet Crawlers" (original by Genesis)
12. "After All" (original by David Bowie)
13. "Letter to Hermione" (original by David Bowie)
14. "If It Be Your Will" (original by Leonard Cohen)
15. "Heaven Stood Still" (original by Mink DeVille)
