= In the Neighborhood =

Song of Tom Waits

Single by Tom Waits

from the album Swordfishtrombones
- B-side: "Singapore"
- Released: February 24, 1986
- Recorded: August 1982 at Sunset Sound, Hollywood, CA
- Genre: Experimental rock; chamber pop
- Length: 3:04
- Label: Island
- Songwriter: Tom Waits
- Producer: Tom Waits

Tom Waits singles chronology
"Downtown Train" (1985)	"In the Neighborhood" (1986)	"Hang On St. Christopher" (1987)

"In the Neighborhood" is a song by Tom Waits appearing on his 1983 album Swordfishtrombones. The song received a music video that same year in November. It was also released as a single three years later, with all formats containing "Singapore" as the B-side and the twelve-inch single containing various live recordings. "In the Neighborhood" became his only song to reach the UK singles chart, where it debuted and peaked at No. 80.

== Critical reception ==
Roger Holland of Sounds magazine was critical of the song, saying that "to suggest that this is one of [Waits'] better works is to open the door to the corollary that there must be some that are worse."

== Formats and track listing ==
All songs written by Tom Waits.

UK 7" single (IS 260)

1. "In the Neighborhood" – 3:04
2. "Singapore" – 2:46
1. "In the Neighborhood" – 3:04
2. "Singapore" – 2:46
3. "Tango 'Till They're Sore" (live) – 3:20
4. "16 Shells" (live) – 5:27

UK 12" single (limited edition) (12IS 160)

1. "In the Neighborhood" – 3:04
2. "Singapore" – 2:46
3. "Tango 'Till They're Sore" (live) – 3:20
4. "Rain Dogs" (live) – 3:40

== Personnel ==
Adapted from the In the Neighborhood liner notes.

- Tom Waits – lead vocals, production

Musicians

- Randy Aldcroft – baritone horn
- Victor Feldman – Hammond B-3 organ, snare drum, bells
- Stephen Taylor Arvizu Hodges – drums, parade drum, cymbals
- Dick "Slyde" Hyde – trombone
- Bill Reichenbach – trombone
- Larry Taylor – double bass

Production and additional personnel

- Biff Dawes – recording, mixing
- Lynn Goldsmith – photography
- Rob O'Connor – design

== Chart performance ==
Chart (1986)	Peak position
UK Singles (OCC)	80

== Accolades ==
Year	Publication	Country	Accolade	Rank
2000	Colin Larkin	United Kingdom	The All-Time Top 100 Singles	57
2004	Elvis Costello	United Kingdom	The Best Songs from the 500 Best Albums Ever	*
2009	The Guardian	United Kingdom	1000 Songs Everyone Must Hear	*
2015	Les Inrockuptibles	France	1000 Necessary Songs	76
2015	NPO Radio 2	Netherlands	Top 2000	1594

(*) designates unordered lists.
