= Rain Dogs =

Studio album by Tom Waits
- Released: September 30, 1985
- Studios: RCA 6th Ave, New York City
- Genres: Experimental rock; Americana
- Length: 53:46
- Label: Island
- Producer: Tom Waits

Tom Waits chronology
Anthology of Tom Waits (1985)	Rain Dogs (1985)	Franks Wild Years (1987)

Singles from Rain Dogs
- 1. "Jockey Full of Bourbon" Released: 1985; 2. "Hang Down Your Head" Released: 1985; 3. "Downtown Train" Released: 1985

Rain Dogs is the ninth studio album by American singer-songwriter Tom Waits, released in September 1985 on Island Records. A loose concept album about "the urban dispossessed" of New York City, Rain Dogs is generally considered the middle album of a trilogy that includes Swordfishtrombones and Franks Wild Years.

The album, which features guitarists Keith Richards and Marc Ribot, is noted for its broad spectrum of musical styles and genres, described by Arion Berger as merging "outsider influences – socialist decadence by way of Kurt Weill, pre-rock integrity from old dirty blues, the elegiac melancholy of New Orleans funeral brass – into a singularly idiosyncratic American style."

The album peaked at number 29 on the UK charts and number 188 on the US Billboard Top 200. Rod Stewart had success with his cover of "Downtown Train", later included on some editions of his 1991 album Vagabond Heart. In 1989, it was ranked number 21 on the Rolling Stone list of the "100 greatest albums of the 1980s." In 2012, the album was ranked number 399 on the magazine's list of "The 500 Greatest Albums of All Time", and at number 357 in 2020.

== Composition and recording ==
Waits wrote the majority of the album in a two-month stint in the fall of 1984 in a basement room at the corner of Washington and Horatio Streets in Manhattan. According to Waits, it was, "kind of a rough area, Lower Manhattan between Canal and 14th Street, just about a block from the river ... It was a good place for me to work. Very quiet, except for the water coming through the pipes every now and then. Sort of like being in a vault."

In preparation for the album, Waits recorded street sounds and other ambient noises on a cassette recorder to get the sound of the city that would be the album's subject matter.

A wide range of instruments was employed to achieve the album's sound, including marimba, accordion, double bass, trombone, and banjo. The album is notable for its organic sound, and the natural means by which it was achieved. Waits, discussing his mistrust of then fashionable studio techniques, said, "If I want a sound, I usually feel better if I've chased it and killed it, skinned it and cooked it. Most things you can get with a button nowadays. So if I was trying for a certain drum sound, my engineer would say, 'Oh, for Christ's sake, why are we wasting our time? Let's just hit this little cup with a stick here, sample something (take a drum sound from another record) and make it bigger in the mix, don't worry about it.' I'd say, 'No, I would rather go in the bathroom and hit the door with a piece of two-by-four very hard.'"

Waits also stated that "if we couldn't get the right sound out of the drum set we'd get a chest of drawers in the bathroom and bang it real hard with a two-by-four," such that "the sounds become your own."

Rain Dogs was the first time that Waits worked with guitarist Marc Ribot, who was impressed by Waits' unusual studio presence. Ribot said, "Rain Dogs was my first major label type recording, and I thought everybody made records the way Tom makes records. ... I've learned since that it's a very original and individual way of producing. As producer apart from himself as writer and singer and guitar player he brings in his ideas, but he's very open to sounds that suddenly and accidentally occur in the studio. I remember one verbal instruction being, 'Play it like a midget's bar mitzvah.'" Ribot also recalls how the band would not rehearse the songs before going to record; rather, Waits would play them the songs on an acoustic guitar in the studio. "He had this ratty old hollow body, and he would spell out the grooves. It wasn't a mechanical kind of recording at all. He has a very individual guitar style he sort of slaps the strings with his thumb ... He let me do what I heard, there was a lot of freedom. If it wasn't going in a direction he liked, he'd make suggestions. But there's damn few ideas I've had which haven't happened on the first or second take."

It also marks Waits' first recording with the Rolling Stones's Keith Richards, who played on "Big Black Mariah", "Union Square" and "Blind Love". Waits later contributed vocals and piano to the Rolling Stones album Dirty Work. Richards cowrote "That Feel" on Waits' Bone Machine (1992) and played on several tracks on Bad as Me (2011). Waits said, "There was something in there that I thought he would understand. I picked out a couple of songs that I thought he would understand and he did. He's got a great voice and he's just a great spirit in the studio. He's very spontaneous, he moves like some kind of animal. I was trying to explain 'Big Black Mariah' and finally I started to move in a certain way and he said, 'Oh, why didn't you do that to begin with? Now I know what you're talking about.' It's like animal instinct."

According to Barney Hoskyns, the album's general theme of "the urban dispossessed" was inspired in part by Martin Bell's 1984 documentary Streetwise, to which Waits had contributed music.

== Artwork ==
Though it has been remarked that the man on the cover bears a striking resemblance to Waits, the photograph is actually one of a series taken by the Swedish photographer Anders Petersen at Café Lehmitz (a café near the Hamburg red-light boulevard Reeperbahn) around 1967. The man and woman depicted on the cover are called Rose and Lilly. Petersen later explained in an interview, "Lilly was everyone's darling, a charismatic woman – many men were in love with her, and she knew it. The man... was known as Rose because of the tattoo on his chest.... Every night, he would come to Cafe Lehmitz to see his friends, but mostly to see Lilly. Rose was a serious guy, and he only had eyes for her."

== Reception ==
Retrospective professional ratings
Review scores
Source	Rating
AllMusic	5/5 stars
Chicago Sun-Times	4/4 stars
Houston Chronicle	4/4 stars
Mojo	5/5 stars
Pitchfork	10/10
Q	5/5 stars
Rolling Stone	5/5 stars
The Rolling Stone Album Guide	5/5 stars
Select	5/5
Uncut	5/5 stars

Rain Dogs received widespread acclaim from contemporary critics. Robert Palmer of The New York Times hailed Rain Dogs as the year's best and "most dazzling and protean pop album."

Comparing the album with its predecessor Swordfishtrombones, NME journalist Biba Kopf wrote that Rain Dogs saw Waits continuing "his continental drift through the crannies and corners of America's varied cultures", and concluded that "the lasting achievement of Rain Dogs is that Waits has had to sacrifice none of his poetry in pursuit of new musical languages to meet its demands." At the end of 1985, the magazine ranked Rain Dogs (jointly with the Jesus and Mary Chain's Psychocandy) as the year's best album. In The Village Voice, Robert Christgau gave Rain Dogs a "B+" grade and said that Waits had "worked out a unique and identifiable lounge-lizard sound that suits his status as the poet of America's non-nine-to-fivers." Anthony DeCurtis penned a mixed assessment for Rolling Stone, finding that "Rain Dogs insists on nosing its way around the barrooms and back alleys Waits has so often visited before."

Retrospectively, Rain Dogs has been noted as one of the most important albums in Waits' career, continuing the new path which he forged from Swordfishtrombones onwards. In a 2002 reappraisal, Rolling Stone critic Arion Berger gave the album five out of five stars, calling it "bony and menacingly beautiful." Berger noted that "it's quirky near-pop, the all-pro instrumentation pushing Waits' not-so-melodic but surprisingly flexible vocals out front, where his own peculiar freak flag, his big heart and his romantic optimism gloriously fly." AllMusic reviewer William Ruhlmann wrote that while "Rain Dogs can't surprise as Swordfishtrombones had", "much of the music matches the earlier album, and there is so much of it that that is enough to qualify Rain Dogs as one of Waits' better albums." Pitchfork's Mark Richardson lauded it as "a romantic and carnivalesque masterpiece imbued with the avant-garde sound of New York", and whose lyrics "might be the best of Waits' career."

In later assessments, Pitchfork listed Rain Dogs as 8th best album of the 1980s, and Slant Magazine listed the album at number 14 on its list of "Best Albums of the 1980s". Rolling Stone listed it as number 21 on its list of "100 Best Albums of the Eighties," as well as listing the album at 399 and 357 in its 2012 and 2020 updates respectively of The 500 Greatest Albums of All Time. The album was also included in the book 1001 Albums You Must Hear Before You Die. In 2000 it was voted number 299 in Colin Larkin's All Time Top 1000 Albums. Elvis Costello included Rain Dogs on his list of essential albums, highlighting "Jockey Full of Bourbon" and "Time".

Radiohead's Thom Yorke recalls:

falling asleep listening to it on my Walkman, only to wake up in the morning with it still on autorepeat in my head. Every track was a short movie set in a mysterious, circus-like down-at-heel America that I had almost no understanding of, with different characters both in the lyrics and the instruments, an entire universe revealed to me for a few minutes only to drop me at the other end of the block – no idea how I’d got there.

Every lyric was an effortless rhyme you could only dream of ever writing. Falling off the tongue so beautifully, but never giving easily, keeping half the story to itself. Waits was playing a character with a darkness and humour that felt far more genuine than anything trying to be, I dunno, genuine in 1985...

This record has never got tired for me, though I have played it over and over throughout my life, as did my kids growing up.

== Track listing ==
All tracks are written by Tom Waits except "Hang Down Your Head" co-written by Kathleen Brennan.

Side one
No.	Title	Length
1.	"Singapore"	2:46
2.	"Clap Hands"	3:47
3.	"Cemetery Polka"	1:51
4.	"Jockey Full of Bourbon"	2:45
5.	"Tango Till They're Sore"	2:49
6.	"Big Black Mariah"	2:44
7.	"Diamonds & Gold"	2:31
8.	"Hang Down Your Head"	2:32
9.	"Time"	3:55
Total length:		25:40

Side two
No.	Title	Length
1.	"Rain Dogs"	2:56
2.	"Midtown" (instrumental)	1:00
3.	"9th & Hennepin"	1:58
4.	"Gun Street Girl"	4:37
5.	"Union Square"	2:24
6.	"Blind Love"	4:18
7.	"Walking Spanish"	3:05
8.	"Downtown Train"	3:53
9.	"Bride of Rain Dog" (instrumental)	1:07
10.	"Anywhere I Lay My Head"	2:48
Total length:		28:06 53:46

== Personnel ==
All personnel credits adapted from the album's liner notes.

Performer

- Tom Waits – vocals (1–10, 12–17, 19), guitar (2, 4, 6, 8–10, 15–17), organ (3, 19), piano (5, 12), harmonium (8, 18), banjo (13)

Musicians

- Michael Blair – percussion (1–4, 7, 8, 12, 13, 17), marimba (2, 7, 10, 12), drums (8, 14, 18), congas (4), bowed saw (12), parade drum (19)
- Stephen Hodges – drums (1, 2, 4, 6, 10, 11, 15, 16), parade drum (3)
- Larry Taylor – double bass (1, 3, 4, 6, 8–10, 15), bass (7, 11, 14, 16)
- Marc Ribot – guitar (1–4, 7, 8, 10)
- "Hollywood" Paul Litteral – trumpet (1, 11, 19)
- Bobby Previte – percussion (2), marimba (2)
- William Schimmel – accordion (3, 9, 10)
- Bob Funk – trombone (1, 3, 5, 10, 11, 19)
- Ralph Carney – baritone saxophone (4, 14), saxophone (11, 18), clarinet (12)
- Greg Cohen – double bass (5, 12, 13)
- Chris Spedding – guitar (1)
- Tony Garnier – double bass (2)
- Keith Richards – guitar (6, 14, 15), backing vocals (15)
- Robert Musso – banjo (7)
- Arno Hecht – tenor saxophone (11, 19)

Musicians (continued)

- Crispin Cioe – saxophone (11, 19)
- Robert Quine – guitar (15, 17)
- Ross Levinson – violin (15)
- John Lurie – alto saxophone (16)
- G.E. Smith – guitar (17)
- Mickey Curry – drums (17)
- Tony Levin – bass (17)
- Robbie Kilgore – organ (17)

Technical personnel

- Tom Waits – record producer
- Robert Musso – engineer, mixing (1–16, 18, 19)
- Tom Gonzales – recording
- Dennis Ferrante – recording
- Jeff Lippay – recording, mixing (17)
- Howie Weinberg – mastering

Design personnel

- Peter Corriston – art direction
- Anders Petersen – photography (front cover)
- Robert Frank – photography (back cover)

== Chart positions ==
Chart (1985)	Peak position
Australia (Kent Music Report)	49
Canada Top Albums/CDs (RPM)	90
Dutch Top 100	23
Norwegian Albums Chart	12
Swedish Albums Chart	5
UK Albums Chart	29
US Billboard 200	188
Chart (1986)	Peak position
Austrian Top 40	26
New Zealand RIANZ Top 40	17

== Certifications ==
Region	Certification	Certified units/sales
Canada (Music Canada)	Gold	50,000^{^}
United Kingdom (BPI)	Gold	100,000^{*}
United States (RIAA)	Gold	500,000^{^}
^{*} Sales figures based on certification alone.^{^} Shipments figures based on certification alone.
