= The World Inside (album) =

Studio album by Human Drama
- Released: 1992
- Recorded: 1991–1992
- Genre: Alternative rock; rock; gothic rock
- Label: Triple X
- Producer: Johnny Indovina

Human Drama chronology
Fascination and Fear / Fading Away (1991)	The World Inside (1992)	Pinups (1993)

Professional ratings
Review scores
Source	Rating
Allmusic	4/5 stars

The World Inside is an album by Human Drama, released by Triple X in 1992. The album landed three videos, "Look into a Strangers Eyes", "Fascination and Fear" and "My Skin", onto Billboard's Top 40 Indie Video chart. Mixed by Harry Maslin (David Bowie “Station To Station & Young Americans”)

== Track listing ==
1. "The World Inside I: Nothing Ever Changes/The Enemy/Here I Will Stay"
2. "The World Inside II"
3. "My Skin"
4. "Tears"
5. "Look into a Strangers Eyes"
6. "This Tangled Web"
7. "Winters Life"
8. "Fascination and Fear"
9. "A Million Years"
10. "Color Me Red"
11. "Father Sing"
12. "The Sound of the Rain"
13. "Voices"
14. "Fading Away"
15. "Times Square"
