= The Wild Reeds =

American indie band

- Origin: Los Angeles, California
- Genres: Indie
- Years active: 2009–2022
- Labels: Dualtone
- Members: Mackenzie Howe; Kinsey Lee; Sharon Silva; Nicholas Jones; Nick Phakpiseth
- Website: www.thewildreedsmusic.com

The Wild Reeds are an American indie band based in Los Angeles, California.

== History ==
The founding members of the Wild Reeds were its three multi-instrumentalist singer-songwriters, Mackenzie Howe, Kinsey Lee and Sharon Silva. They first met as concertgoers at the West Hollywood club the Troubadour when they were students: Howe and Silva at Azusa Pacific University, and Lee at Glendora's Citrus College. Each of them had already begun to perform as amateur solo artists at open-mic events and at college parties. Their friendship led to their supporting one another as backing singers. They began working together as a trio in 2009, after the idea was suggested to them by someone who had enjoyed their performance at a charitable fundraiser. They were subsequently joined by the bassist Nick Phakpiseth and the drummer Nicholas Jones. Their songs span the genres of alt-country, folk, experimental pop and indie-rock, and are characterized by what has been described as "ethereal" vocal harmonizing and an essentially hopeful nature.

The Wild Reeds released their first full-length album, the self-published Blind and Brave, on August 9, 2014. Their second, Dualtone Records' The World We Built, followed on April 7, 2017, and their third, Cheers, again via Dualtone, on March 8, 2019.

== Discography ==
LPs

- Blind and Brave (2014, self-released)
- The World We Built (2017, Dualtone)
- Cheers (2019, Dualtone)

EPs

- Best Wishes (2016, self-released)
- New Ways to Die (2018, self-released)

== Solo projects ==
Mackenzie Howe released a debut solo EP under the name of Pet Dress titled Fear of Breakdown which was released on June 12, 2020.

Sharon Silva released her debut solo record, Underachiever, on October 24, 2025.
