= The Man Who Sold the World (album) =

1970 studio album by David Bowie

- Original 1970 American release

Studio album by David Bowie
- Released: 4 November 1970 (Note: There is some debate about the release dates. In 2021, the David Bowie official website, having earlier queried the previously accepted US release date, published evidence that the official UK release date was 8 April 1971; the UK date was previously reported as 10 April. Similarly, the Bowie estate has claimed that the official US release date was in 1971, "as was the UK version," with the blog specifying a January release. According to Chris O'Leary, the two varied release dates were due to "the near-independence of Mercury's US and UK arms".)
- Recorded: 17 April – 22 May 1970
- Studios: Trident and Advision (London)
- Genres: Hard rock; psychedelic rock; blues rock; heavy metal
- Length: 40:29
- Label: Mercury
- Producer: Tony Visconti

David Bowie chronology
| The World of David Bowie (1970) | The Man Who Sold the World (1970) | Hunky Dory (1971) |

Alternative cover
- 1971 British release

The Man Who Sold the World is the third studio album by the English musician David Bowie, originally released through Mercury Records in the United States on 4 November 1970 and in the United Kingdom on 8 April 1971. Produced by Tony Visconti and recorded in London from April to May 1970, the album features the first appearances on a Bowie record of future Spiders from Mars members Mick Ronson and Mick Woodmansey.

Following the largely acoustic and folk rock sound of David Bowie (1969), The Man Who Sold the World marked a shift toward hard rock, with elements of blues rock. The lyrics are darker than his previous releases, exploring themes of insanity, religion, technology and war. None of its songs were released as singles; some tracks appeared as B-sides between 1970 and 1973. Originally titled Metrobolist, a play on the film Metropolis (1927), the title was changed at the last minute by Mercury without Bowie's consultation.

The album was released with different cover artwork in the US and the UK. For the US release, the artwork was a cartoon-like drawing by Michael J. Weller of a cowboy in front of an asylum. The UK cover by Keith MacMillan features Bowie wearing a Michael Fish-designed blue dress. A 1972 reissue by RCA Records featured a black-and-white picture of Bowie's then-current character Ziggy Stardust; reissues since 1990 have revived the original UK artwork.

The Man Who Sold the World was originally better received by music critics in the US than in the UK. Nevertheless, it was a commercial failure in both countries; the 1972 reissue managed to chart in both the US and the UK. Retrospectively, the album has been praised by critics for the band's performance and the unsettling nature of its music and lyrics, being considered by many to be the start of Bowie's "classic period". It has since been reissued multiple times and was remixed in 2020, under its original title Metrobolist, for its 50th anniversary.

== Background ==
David Bowie's breakthrough single "Space Oddity" was released in July 1969, bringing him commercial success and attention. Its parent album, David Bowie (Space Oddity), released later that year, fared worse, partly due to the failure of Philips Records to promote the album efficiently. By 1970, the attention Bowie had garnered from "Space Oddity" had dissipated and his follow-up single, "The Prettiest Star", failed to chart.

Realising that his potential as a solo artist was dwindling, Bowie formed a band, Hype, with the bassist Tony Visconti, one of his Space Oddity collaborators, the drummer John Cambridge, and the guitarist Mick Ronson, whom Bowie met in February 1970. For the group's performances, the members wore flamboyant superhero-like costumes. (Note: The band members all performed under pseudonyms: Bowie was Rainbow Man, Ronson was Gangster Man, Visconti was Hype Man and Cambridge was Cowboy Man.) Bowie halted Hype performances at the end of March 1970 so he could focus on recording and songwriting, and resolve managing disputes with his manager Kenneth Pitt. A new single version of the Space Oddity track "Memory of a Free Festival" and an early attempt at "The Supermen" were recorded during this time.

Cambridge was dismissed from Hype at the end of March, and was replaced by Mick "Woody" Woodmansey. (Note: According to the biographer Kevin Cann, Cambridge was dismissed by Bowie, but according to the biographer Nicholas Pegg, Visconti recalled that the dismissal was Ronson's request.) Woodmansey said of Bowie in 2015: "This guy was living and breathing being a rock & roll star." By April 1970, the four members of Hype were living in Haddon Hall, Beckenham, an Edwardian mansion converted to a block of flats that was described by one visitor as having an ambiance "like Dracula's living room". Ronson and Visconti built a makeshift studio under the grand staircase at Haddon Hall, where Bowie recorded many of his early 1970s demos.

== Recording ==
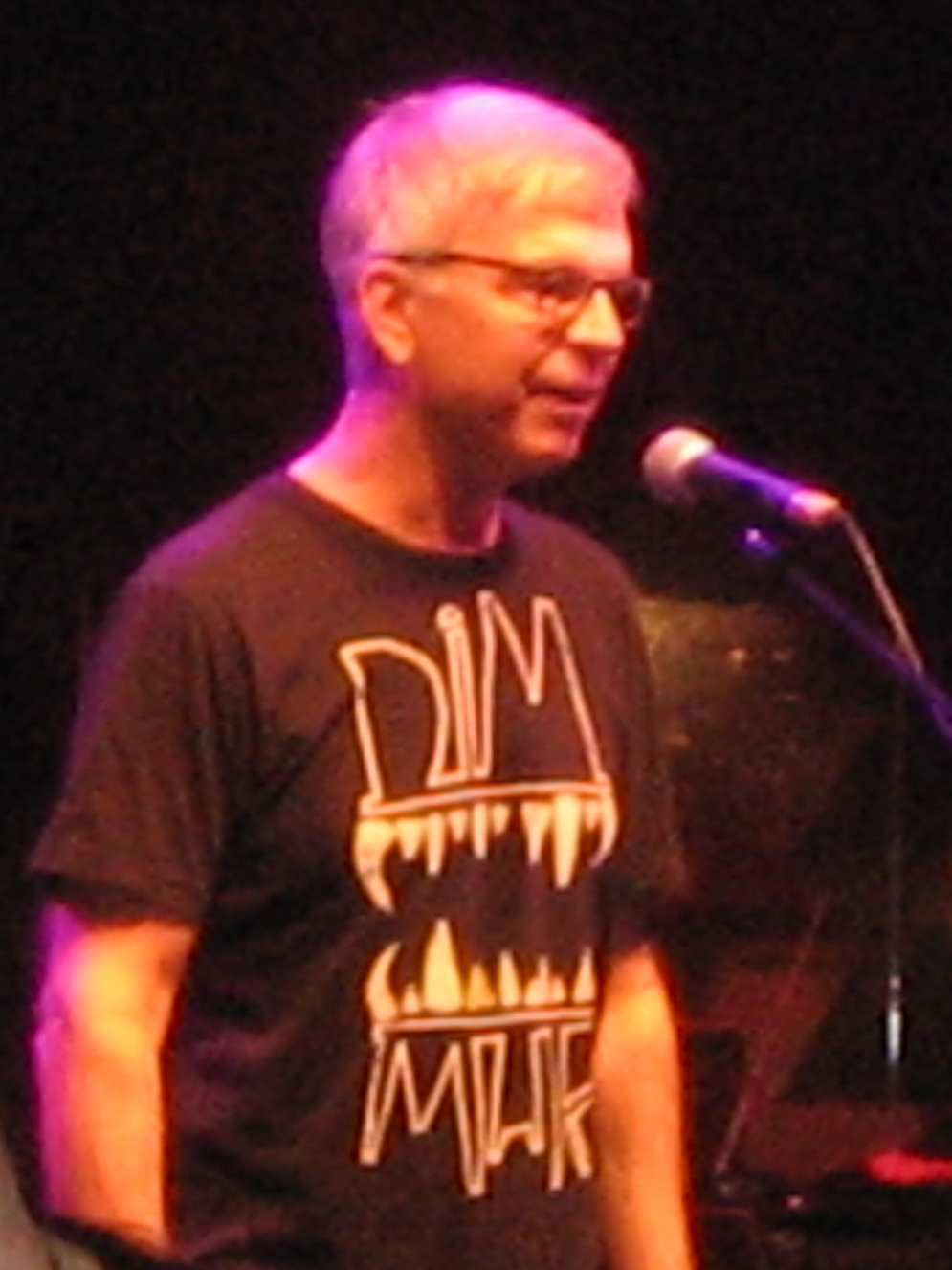
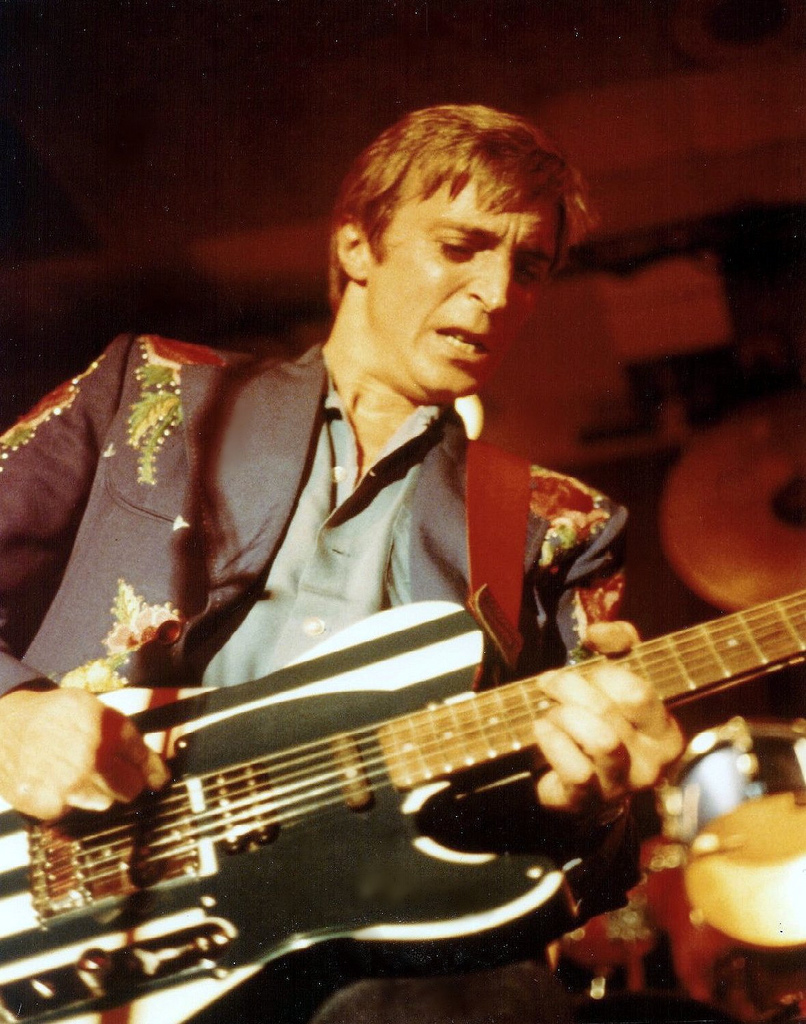
With Bowie's lack of interest in the project, Tony Visconti (left, 2007) and Mick Ronson (right, 1981) arranged most of the music on The Man Who Sold the World.

Recording for The Man Who Sold the World began on 17 April 1970 at Advision Studios in London, with the group beginning work on "All the Madmen". The next day, Ralph Mace was hired to play a Moog synthesiser (Note: The Moog synthesiser Mace played was borrowed from George Harrison.) following his work on the single version of "Memory of a Free Festival". At the time, Mace was a 40-year-old concert pianist who was also head of the classical music department at Mercury Records. During this time, Bowie terminated his contract with Pitt and met his future manager Tony Defries, who assisted Bowie in the termination. Recording moved to Trident Studios in London on 21 April and continued there until mid-May. On 4 May, the band recorded "Running Gun Blues" and "Saviour Machine", the latter of which was originally the working title for the title track, before Bowie reworked the song into a different melody to form the final version of "Saviour Machine". Recording and mixing was moved back to Advision on 12 May and completed ten days later. Bowie recorded his vocal for the title track on the final day.

Bowie was preoccupied with his new wife Angie and managerial issues at the time, so the music was largely arranged by Ronson and Visconti. Ronson used the sessions to learn about many production and arrangement techniques from Visconti. Although Bowie is officially credited as the composer of all music on The Man Who Sold the World, the author Peter Doggett quoted Visconti as saying that "the songs were written by all four of us. We'd jam in a basement, and Bowie would just say whether he liked them or not." In Doggett's narrative, "The band (sometimes with Bowie contributing guitar, sometimes not) would record an instrumental track, which might or might not be based upon an original Bowie idea. Then, at the last possible moment, Bowie would reluctantly uncurl himself from the sofa on which he was lounging with his wife, and dash off a set of lyrics." Conversely, Bowie said in 1998, "I really did object to the impression that I did not write the songs on The Man Who Sold the World. You only have to check out the chord changes. No-one writes chord changes like that." "The Width of a Circle" and "The Supermen", for example, were already in existence before the sessions began.

== Music and lyrics ==
The sonic landscape was Visconti's. The band's contribution – how the drums and bass should work together with the guitar – was something [Ronson] got really involved in.

— David Bowie in an interview with Mojo

The Man Who Sold the World was a departure from the largely acoustic and folk rock sound of Space Oddity. According to the music critic Greg Kot, it marked Bowie's change of direction into hard rock. Stephen Thomas Erlewine of AllMusic described the album as "almost all hard blues rock or psychedelic folk rock", while Doggett writes that it is "filled with propulsive hard rock". Much of the material has a distinct heavy metal edge that distinguishes it from Bowie's other releases, and has been compared to contemporary acts such as Led Zeppelin and Black Sabbath. According to Marc Spitz, Ronson was intent on making a heavy blues album "worthy of Cream". The music writer Simon Reynolds, comparing parts of the album to Van Der Graaf Generator and Comus, interpreted it as "Bowie trying to pass for an underground band", despite having already abandoned hippy values.

Like the music, the lyrics are significantly darker than its predecessor. According to Doggett, they contain numerous themes that Bowie continued exploring throughout the rest of the 1970s decade, including "madness, alienation, violence, confusion of identity, power, darkness and sexual possession". The lyrics have also been seen as reflecting the influence of such figures as Aleister Crowley, Franz Kafka and Friedrich Nietzsche. Since Bowie wrote most of the lyrics at the last minute, Chris O'Leary argues that The Man Who Sold the World is a more "coherent" concept album than Ziggy Stardust (1972) and Diamond Dogs (1974). He continues, saying that the songs "mirror and answer each other", sharing similar themes and imagery.

=== Side one ===
The opening track, "The Width of a Circle", is an eight-minute epic that delves into progressive rock. Originally debuted in February 1970 at a BBC session, the song is led by Ronson's widely lauded guitar work, using feedback and improvisation throughout. The lyrics reference the Lebanese poet Khalil Gibran and in the song's second half, the narrator has a sexual encounter with God in the devil's lair. Nicholas Pegg describes the song's sound as reminiscent of Deep Purple and Black Sabbath. The lyrics of "All the Madmen" were inspired by Bowie's half-brother Terry Burns and reflect the theme of institutionalised madness. The song contains a recorder part that creates an atmosphere, which Buckley describes as "childlike dementia". Doggett describes the Moog synthesiser as an integral part of the recording, noting that it gives the track a "stunning conclusion". Spitz calls the track "terrifying".

For "Black Country Rock", Bowie had a small portion of the melody and four quickly-written lines that he gave to Ronson and Visconti, who expanded upon them to create the song. A blues rock and hard rock song, Bowie impersonates Marc Bolan in his vocal performance. "After All" is musically different from the rest of The Man Who Sold the World, being more akin to folk rock than hard rock. Featuring an "oh, by jingo" chant that is reminiscent of music hall numbers, the lyrics follow a group of innocent children who have not experienced the corruptions of adulthood. Similar to "The Supermen", the song references the works of Nietzsche.

=== Side two ===
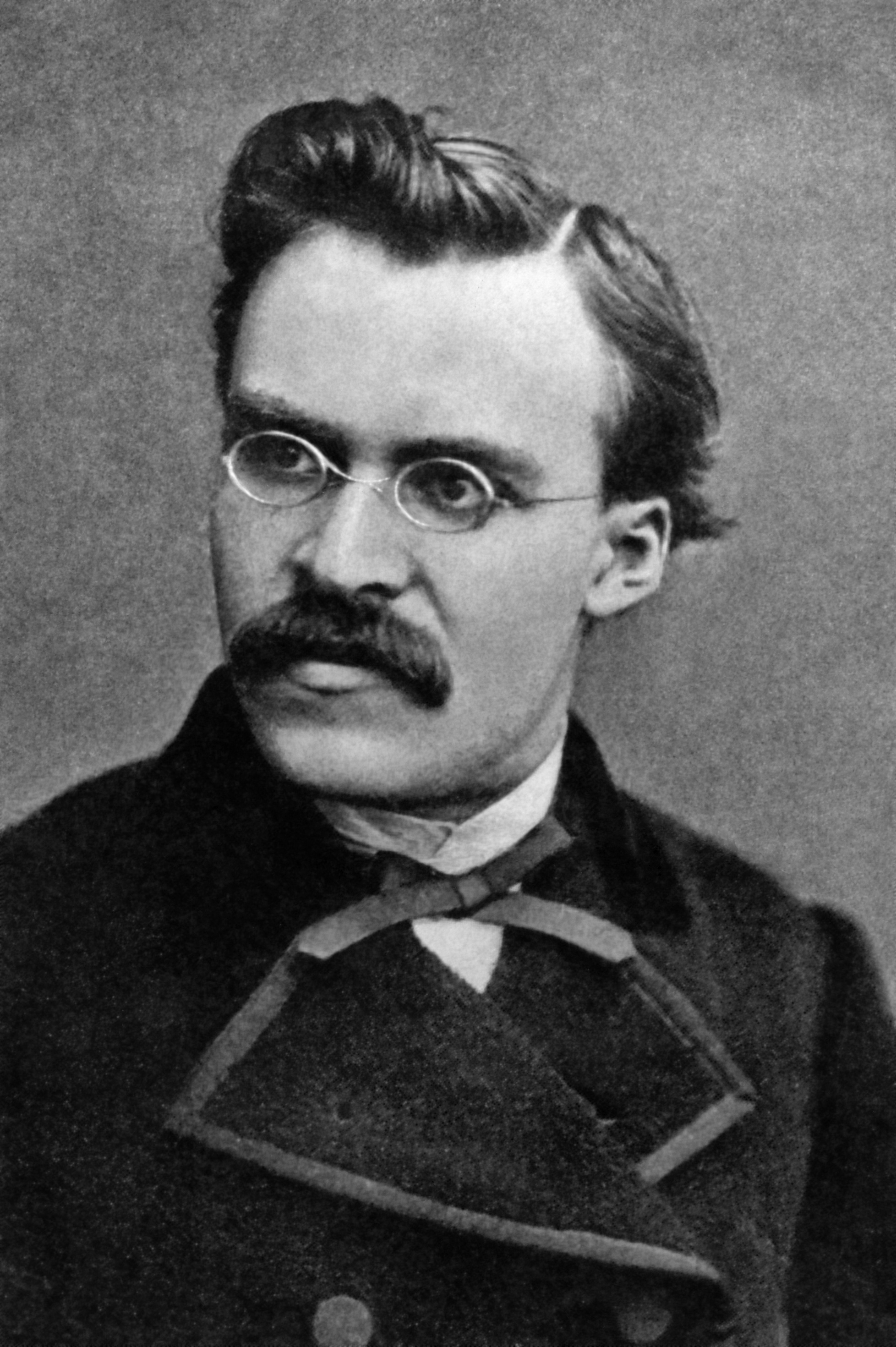
Several tracks, including "The Supermen", reflect the ideals of Friedrich Nietzsche (pictured in 1869).

The lyrics of "Running Gun Blues" discuss gun-toting assassins and Vietnam War commentary, specifically the Mỹ Lai massacre of 1968. Although the lyrics reflect the themes of Space Oddity, the music reflects the predominant hard rock style of The Man Who Sold the World and points to Bowie's future musical direction. Similar to the previous track, "Saviour Machine" is rooted in blues rock and hard rock. The lyrics explore the concept of computers overtaking the human race; Bowie's metallic-like vocal performance enhances the scenario. Like the majority of the tracks, "She Shook Me Cold" was mostly created by Ronson, Visconti and Woodmansey without Bowie's input. Spitz compares the song's blues style to Led Zeppelin, while O'Leary and Pegg write that Ronson was attempting to emulate Cream's Jack Bruce. The lyrics explore a sexual conquest similar to "You Shook Me" (then-recently covered by Jeff Beck) and Robert Johnson's "Love in Vain".

Multiple reviewers have described the album's title track as "haunting". Musically, it is based around a "circular" guitar riff from Ronson. The lyrics are cryptic and evocative, inspired by numerous poems, including "Antigonish" (1899) by William Hughes Mearns. The narrator has an encounter with a kind of doppelgänger, as suggested in the second chorus where "I never lost control" is replaced with "We never lost control". Bowie's vocals are heavily "phased" throughout and contain none of the, in Doggett's words, "metallic theatrics" that are found on the rest of the album. The song also features güiro percussion, which Pegg describes as "sinister". "The Supermen" prominently reflects the themes of Nietzsche, particularly his theory of Übermensch, or "Supermen". Like other tracks on the album, the song is predominantly hard rock. Bowie described it in 1973 as a "period piece", and later "pre-fascist".

== Cover artwork ==
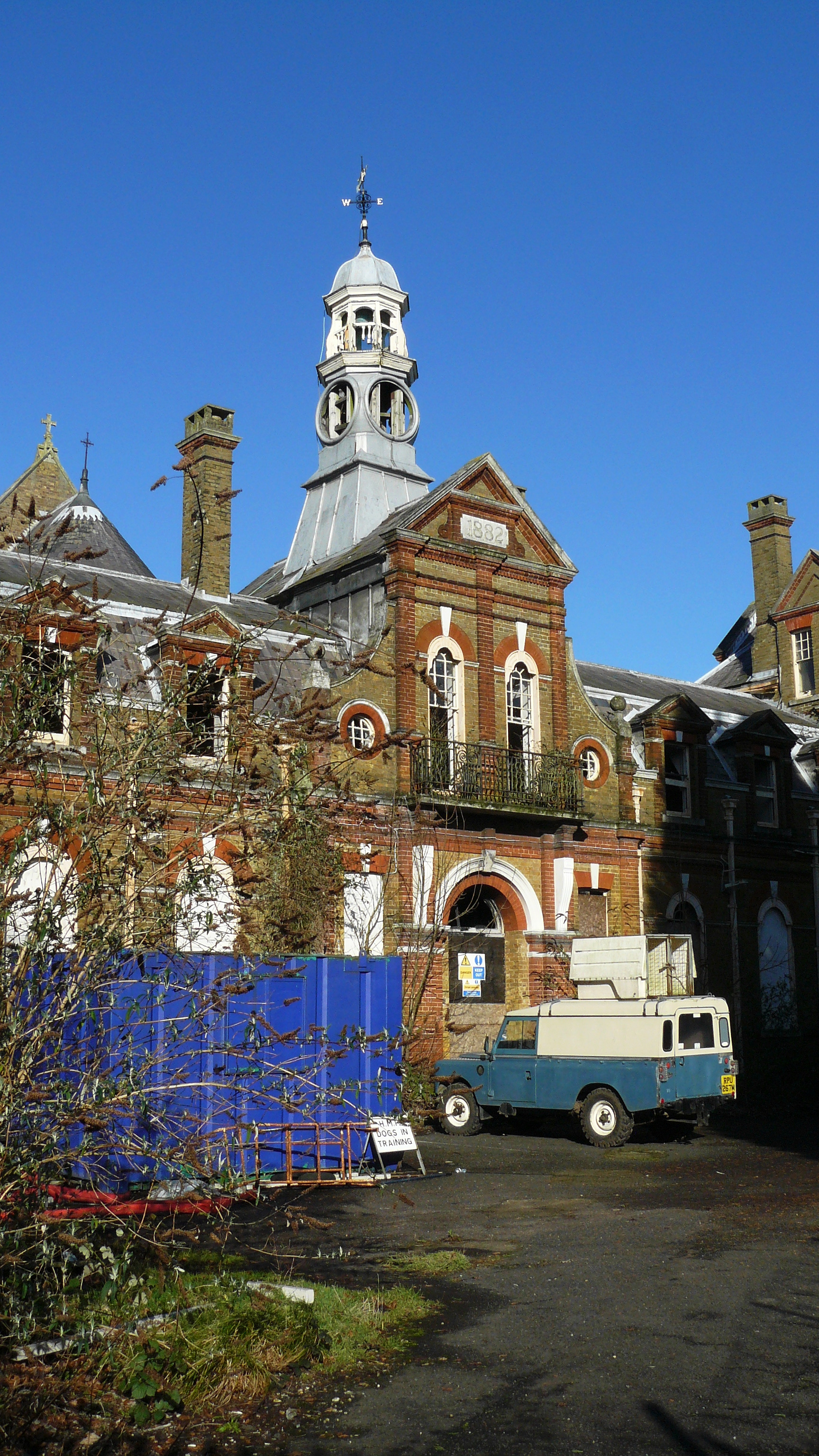
Cane Hill in 2009. The asylum appeared on the cover of the 1970 American release.

The original 1970 US release of The Man Who Sold the World featured a cartoon-like cover drawing by Bowie's friend Michael J. Weller, featuring a cowboy in front of Cane Hill asylum. Weller, whose friend was a patient there, suggested the idea after Bowie had asked him to create a design that would capture the music's foreboding tone. Drawing on pop art styles, he depicted a dreary main entrance block to the hospital with a damaged clock tower. For the design's foreground, Weller used a photograph of the actor John Wayne to draw a cowboy figure wearing a ten-gallon hat and holding a rifle, which was meant to be an allusion to the song "Running Gun Blues". Bowie suggested Weller incorporate the "exploding head" signature on the cowboy's hat, a feature he had previously used on his posters while a part of the Arts Lab. He also added an empty speech balloon for the cowboy figure, which was intended to include the line "roll up your sleeves and show us your arms"—a pun on record players, guns, and drug use—but Mercury found the idea too risqué and the balloon was left blank. Bowie wanted the album titled Metrobolist, a play on Fritz Lang's 1927 film Metropolis, but Mercury changed the title without Bowie's consent to The Man Who Sold the World.

Bowie was enthusiastic about the finished design, but soon reconsidered the idea and had the art department at Philips Records, a subsidiary of Mercury, enlist the photographer Keith MacMillan to shoot an alternate cover. The shoot took place in a "domestic environment" of the Haddon Hall living room, where Bowie reclined on a chaise longue in a cream and blue satin "man's dress", an early indication of his interest in exploiting his androgynous appearance. The dress was designed by the British fashion designer Michael Fish. Bowie's look and pose in the photo were inspired by a Pre-Raphaelite painting by Dante Gabriel Rossetti. In the United States, Mercury rejected MacMillan's photo and released the album with Weller's design as its cover, much to Bowie's displeasure, although he successfully lobbied the label to use the photo for the release in the United Kingdom. In 1972, he said Weller's design was "horrible" but reappraised it in 1999, saying he "actually thought the cartoon cover was really cool".

While promoting The Man Who Sold the World in the US, Bowie wore the Fish dress in February 1971 on his first promotional tour and during interviews, despite the fact that the Americans had no knowledge of the then-unreleased UK cover. The 1971 German release's artwork presented a winged hybrid creature with Bowie's head and a hand for a body, preparing to flick the Earth away. For the cover of the 1972 worldwide reissue by RCA Records, the label used a black-and-white photograph of Bowie in character as Ziggy Stardust in an action pose, wielding a guitar and with his left leg up in the air. The pose was inspired by Bowie's friend Freddie Buretti, who appeared in a similar pose for a brochure in July 1972. The image remained the cover art on reissues until 1990 when the Rykodisc release reinstated the UK "dress" cover. The "dress" cover has appeared on subsequent reissues of the album.

In 2011, when the Victoria and Albert Museum in London was putting together the list of Bowie artifacts for the David Bowie Is show, the curators asked for the dress to display, but found that the dress had gone missing from Bowie's collection.

== Release ==
The Man Who Sold the World was released in the US through Mercury on 4 November 1970, and in the UK on 8 April 1971. Bowie was initially aggravated that Mercury had retitled the album from his preferred title of Metrobolist without his consultation, but following its release in the US, Bowie attempted to persuade the label to retitle the album Holy Holy after his newly released single "Holy Holy". Following the commercial flop of "Holy Holy", the title remained The Man Who Sold the World for the UK release. According to Kevin Cann, the album was disliked by Mercury executives, but was played on US radio stations frequently and the "heavy rock content" increased interest in Bowie. Cann says that The Man Who Sold the World also developed an underground following and laid "solid foundations" for Ziggy Stardust.

None of the songs from the album were released as singles at the time, although a promo version of "All the Madmen" was issued in the US in 1970. Mercury released "All the Madmen" as a single, with Space Oddity's "Janine" on the B-side, but withdrew it. The same song appeared in Eastern Europe during 1973, as did "The Width of a Circle". "Black Country Rock" was released as the B-side of "Holy Holy" in the UK in January 1971, shortly before the release of The Man Who Sold the World. The title track appeared as the B-side of both the US single release of "Space Oddity" in 1972 and the UK release of "Life on Mars?" in 1973.

=== Commercial performance ===
The Man Who Sold the World was initially a commercial failure. By the end of June 1971, the album had sold only 1,395 copies in the US. The same year, Bowie said: "[it] sold like hotcakes in Beckenham, and nowhere else". Following his commercial breakthrough with Ziggy Stardust in 1972, RCA reissued The Man Who Sold the World in the UK and the US on 10 November. This release peaked at number 24 on the UK Albums Chart, where it remained for 30 weeks, and number 105 on the US Billboard Top LPs & Tape chart, spending 23 weeks on the chart. The album's 1990 reissue charted again on the UK Albums Chart, peaking at number 66.

== Critical reception ==
Upon release, The Man Who Sold the World was generally more well-received critically in the US than in the UK. Music publications Melody Maker and NME originally found The Man Who Sold the World "surprisingly excellent" and "rather hysterical", respectively. Reviewing for Rolling Stone in February 1971, John Mendelsohn called the album "uniformly excellent" and commented that Visconti's "use of echo, phasing, and other techniques on Bowie's voice ... serves to reinforce the jaggedness of Bowie's words and music", which he interpreted as "oblique and fragmented images that are almost impenetrable separately but which convey with effectiveness an ironic and bitter sense of the world when considered together". Writing for The Philadelphia Inquirer, Jack Lloyd believed that the music was "unsettling" and non-commercial, but called Bowie "one of the most unique...talents from the British pop music scene", despite his lack of recognition.

Colman Andrews of Phonograph Record felt that record was a mixed bag, finding the lyrics both good and bad and Bowie's voice to be undistinguishable from other British artists, but enjoyed his vocal performance. Overall, Andrews stated, "[The Man Who Sold the World] TRIES to define some new province of modern music, even if it's not completely successful. For that alone it deserves some attention." The Village Voice critic Robert Christgau considered the album and its predecessor to be "overwrought excursions". Mike Saunders from Who Put the Bomp magazine included The Man Who Sold the World in his ballot of 1971's top 10 albums for the first annual Pazz & Jop poll of American critics, published in The Village Voice in February 1972.

== Subsequent events ==
After the completion of The Man Who Sold the World, Bowie became less active in both the studio and on stage. His contract with music publisher Essex had expired and Defries, his new manager, was facing prior contractual challenges. In August 1970, Visconti parted ways with Bowie owing to his dislike of Defries and his frustration with Bowie's lack of enthusiasm during the making of The Man Who Sold the World; it was the last time he saw Bowie for three or four years. Ronson and Woodmansey also left because of other personal conflicts with Bowie. Despite his annoyance with Bowie during the sessions, Visconti still rated The Man Who Sold the World as his best work with him until his fourteenth studio album Scary Monsters (and Super Creeps) (1980).

The critical success of The Man Who Sold the World in the US prompted Mercury to send Bowie on a promotional radio tour of the country in February 1971. Upon his return, he wrote the majority of the material that appeared on the follow-up albums Hunky Dory (1971) and Ziggy Stardust. Bowie also convened with Ronson and Woodmansey, who returned to play on both records. Following the commercial disappointment of Hunky Dory, Bowie finally found commercial success with Ziggy Stardust in 1972. Ronson and Woodmansey, along with bassist Trevor Bolder, became famous as the Spiders from Mars.

== Influence and legacy ==
Retrospective professional reviews
Review scores
| Source | Rating |
|---|---|
| AllMusic | 4.5/5 stars |
| Chicago Tribune | 2.5/4 stars |
| Encyclopedia of Popular Music | 3/5 stars |
| New Musical Express | 8/10 |
| Pitchfork | 8.5/10 |
| Q | 3/5 stars |
| The Rolling Stone Album Guide | 3.5/5 stars |
| Spin | 4/5 stars |
| Spin Alternative Record Guide | 5/10 |

The Man Who Sold the World has been retrospectively described by Bowie's biographers and commentators as the beginning of Bowie's artistic growth, many considering it the first album where he began to find his sound. David Buckley has described it as "the first Bowie album proper", and NME critics Roy Carr and Charles Shaar Murray stated, "this is where the story really starts". Erlewine cited The Man Who Sold the World as the beginning of Bowie's "classic period". Annie Zaleski of The A.V. Club called the album his "career blueprint", writing that it was musically a forerunner to the "swaggering electric disorientation" of Ziggy Stardust and Aladdin Sane (1973), but its greater importance on sequencing and atmosphere, as well as stronger songwriting, predated Hunky Dory. Paul Trynka calls The Man Who Sold the World Bowie's "first truly gripping work". Pegg finds it one of the best and most important albums in the history of rock music. In a 2013 readers' poll for Rolling Stone, it was voted Bowie's tenth greatest album.

The album has been praised for the band's performance and the unsettling nature of its music and lyrics. In a review for AllMusic, Erlewine complimented its "tight, twisted heavy guitar rock that appears simple on the surface but sounds more gnarled upon each listen". He viewed its music and Bowie's "paranoid futuristic tales" as "bizarre", adding that: "Musically, there isn't much time for innovation ... but there's an unsettling edge to the band's performance, which makes the record one of Bowie's best albums." In a review upon the album's reissue, a writer for Q called it "a robust, sexually charged affair", while a Mojo columnist wrote, "A robust set that spins with dizzying disorientation ... Bowie's armoury was being hastily assembled, though it was never deployed with such thrilling abandon again." Douglas Wolk of Pitchfork called the album the "dark horse" of Bowie's catalogue. Comparing The Man Who Sold the World to its predecessor, he praised the arrangements as tougher and "more effective", and complimented his artistic growth.

The album has since been cited as inspiring the goth rock, dark wave and science fiction elements of work by artists such as Siouxsie and the Banshees, the Cure, Gary Numan, John Foxx and Nine Inch Nails. It has been claimed that glam rock began with the release of The Man Who Sold the World, though this is also attributed to Bolan's appearance on the UK television programme Top of the Pops in March 1971 wearing glitter. In his journal, Kurt Cobain of Nirvana listed it at number 45 on his top 50 favourite albums list. The title track provided an unlikely hit for Scottish pop singer Lulu, which was produced by Bowie and Ronson, and was covered by many artists over the years, including Richard Barone in 1987 and Nirvana in 1993 for their live album MTV Unplugged in New York. In 2024, Uncut ranked the album at number 379 on their list of "500 Greatest Albums of All Time".

=== Reissues ===
The Man Who Sold the World was first released on CD by RCA in 1984. The album was reissued by Rykodisc/EMI in 1990 with bonus tracks, including a 1971 rerecording of "Holy Holy" that had originally been issued as a B-side in 1974. "Holy Holy" was incorrectly described in the liner notes as the original single version recorded in 1970. Bowie vetoed inclusion of the earlier recording, and the single remained its only official release until 2015, when it was included on Re:Call 1, part of the Five Years (1969–1973) compilation. Additionally, the liner notes incorrectly listed the personnel for "Lightning Frightening" as those who played with Bowie during the Space Oddity period, when in fact the personnel were members of the Arnold Corns sessions proto-group.

In 1999, The Man Who Sold the World was reissued again by Virgin/EMI, without the bonus tracks but with 24-bit digitally remastered sound. In 2015, the album was remastered for the Five Years (1969–1973) box set. It was released on CD, vinyl and digital formats, both as part of the compilation and separately.

==== Metrobolist remix ====
On 6 November 2020, the album was reissued by Parlophone under its working title of Metrobolist to commemorate its 50th anniversary. The reissue featured an updated version of the original Weller artwork as its official cover. For this release, Visconti remixed every song with the original vision in mind, except "After All", because he felt the 2015 remastered mix was "perfect as is". In 2021, a companion 2-CD set called The Width of a Circle was announced to celebrate the 50th anniversary of the British release. A press notice stated that the collection, released on 28 May, features "non-album singles, a BBC In Concert session, music for a TV play and further Visconti remixes wrapping up (Bowie's) recordings from 1970 and revealing the first sonic steps toward Hunky Dory".

== Track listing ==
All tracks are written by David Bowie.

Side one
| No. | Title | Length |
|---|---|---|
| 1. | "The Width of a Circle" | 8:07 |
| 2. | "All the Madmen" | 5:38 |
| 3. | "Black Country Rock" | 3:33 |
| 4. | "After All" | 3:52 |

Side two
| No. | Title | Length |
|---|---|---|
| 5. | "Running Gun Blues" | 3:12 |
| 6. | "Saviour Machine" | 4:27 |
| 7. | "She Shook Me Cold" | 4:13 |
| 8. | "The Man Who Sold the World" | 3:58 |
| 9. | "The Supermen" | 3:39 |

== Personnel ==
Adapted from The Man Who Sold the World liner notes and the biographer Chris O'Leary:

- David Bowie – lead vocals, backing vocals, 12-string acoustic guitar, Stylophone
- Mick Ronson – lead and rhythm guitar, acoustic guitar, backing vocals, recorder, piano
- Tony Visconti – bass, backing vocals, recorder
- Mick Woodmansey – drums, timpani, percussion
- Ralph Mace – Moog synthesiser

Technical

- Tony Visconti – producer
- Ken Scott – engineer
- Gerald Chevin – engineer
- Robin McBride – executive producer

== Charts ==
Chart performance for The Man Who Sold the World
| Year | Chart | Peak position |
|---|---|---|
| 1972–73 | UK Albums (Official Charts) | 24 |
| 1972–73 | US Billboard Top LPs & Tape | 105 |
| 1972–73 | Yugoslavian Albums (Radio TV Revue & Studio) | 10 |
| 1990 | UK Albums (Official Charts) | 66 |
| 2016 | Canadian Albums (Billboard) | 62 |
| 2016 | Dutch Albums (Album Top 100) | 48 |
| 2016 | French Albums (SNEP) | 149 |
| 2016 | Irish Albums (IRMA) | 24 |
| 2016 | Italian Albums (FIMI) | 49 |
| 2016 | UK Albums (Official Charts) | 21 |
| 2016 | US Top Pop Catalog Albums (Billboard) | 38 |
| 2020 | German Albums (Offizielle Top 100) | 22 |
| 2020 | Hungarian Albums (MAHASZ) | 12 |
| 2020 | UK Albums (OCC) | 72 |

== Certifications ==
Certifications for The Man Who Sold the World
| Region | Certification | Certified units/sales |
|---|---|---|
| United Kingdom (BPI) | Gold | 100,000^{‡} |
Summaries
| Worldwide | — | 1,700,000 |
^{‡} Sales+streaming figures based on certification alone.
