= Downtown Train =

1985 single by Tom Waits

Single by Tom Waits

from the album Rain Dogs
- B-side: "Tango Till They're Sore"
- Released: November 1985
- Studio: RCA (New York City)
- Genre: Rock
- Length: 3:53
- Label: Island
- Songwriter: Tom Waits
- Producer: Tom Waits

Tom Waits singles chronology
"Hang Down Your Head" (1985)	"Downtown Train" (1985)	"Hang On St. Christopher" (1987)

"Downtown Train" is a song by American singer-songwriter Tom Waits released on his ninth studio album Rain Dogs in 1985. The promo video, which was directed by Jean-Baptiste Mondino and produced by Andrea Ambandos, was filmed in black and white and features a cameo appearance by boxer Jake LaMotta. Several musical artists have charted with their covers of "Downtown Train", including Rod Stewart, Patty Smyth, and Bob Seger. Reviewing "Downtown Train" for Music Week, Jerry Smith called it an "effective" single.

== Personnel ==
- Tom Waits – vocals, guitar
- Michael Blair – percussion
- Robert Quine – guitar
- G. E. Smith – guitar
- Mickey Curry – drums
- Tony Levin – bass
- Robby Kilgore – organ

== Rod Stewart version ==
"Downtown Train"

Single by Rod Stewart

from the album The Best of Rod Stewart
- Released: November 1989
- Length: 4:40
- Label: Warner Bros.
- Songwriter: Tom Waits
- Producer: Trevor Horn

Rod Stewart singles chronology
"This Old Heart of Mine" (1989)	"Downtown Train" (1989)	"I Don't Want to Talk About It" (1990)

Music video
- "Downtown Train" on YouTube

Rod Stewart recorded a cover version that became a number-three hit on the Billboard Hot 100 chart after being released as a single in late 1989, and was also a number-one single on the album rock and adult contemporary charts. The song went to number one in Canada and made the top ten on the UK Singles Chart in 1990. Stewart received a Grammy nomination for the song in the category Best Male Pop Vocal performance. Originally released as a non-album single, Stewart's version of "Downtown Train" was included on some editions of his 1991 album Vagabond Heart.

== Other recordings ==
Bob Seger also recorded a version of "Downtown Train" in 1989 before Rod Stewart recorded his version. Seger claimed that on a trip to London he told Rod Stewart he had recorded a version of "Downtown Train" and then one month later Rod Stewart recorded his version. Rod Stewart and his management have denied that Rod Stewart stole the idea from Bob Seger. Seger decided not to release his version in 1989 as originally planned but instead re-recorded it in 2011 for his album Ultimate Hits: Rock and Roll Never Forgets.

Patty Smyth released a version in 1987 that reached number 95 on the Billboard Hot 100. The promo video for the song was directed by David Fincher.

Everything but the Girl's acoustic cover, also recorded in 1989 and later put on the reissue of The Language of Life, was used for the climactic scene of the 2014's final episode of the long-running series How I Met Your Mother. Music supervisor Andy Gowan says that Carter Bays "basically put it in the script, and wrote that script with that song in mind"; Gowan described the song as "heartbreakingly beautiful" and captured both the "sweet and romantic" and the "somber, dark part" of the scene.

== Charts ==
=== Patty Smyth version ===
Chart (1987)	Peak position
US Billboard Hot 100	95
US Mainstream Rock Airplay (Billboard)	40

=== Rod Stewart version ===
==== Weekly charts ====
Chart (1989–1990)	Peak position
Australia (ARIA)	29
Canada Top Singles (RPM)	1
Canada Adult Contemporary (RPM)	1
Europe (Eurochart Hot 100)	25
European Airplay (Music & Media)	4
Finland (Suomen virallinen lista)	16
Ireland (IRMA)	13
Netherlands (Dutch Top 40 Tipparade)	2
Netherlands (Single Top 100)	42
New Zealand (Recorded Music NZ)	30
UK Singles (Official Charts)	10
US Billboard Hot 100	3
US Adult Contemporary (Billboard)	1
US Mainstream Rock Airplay (Billboard)	1
West Germany (GfK)	39

==== Year-end charts ====
Chart (1990)	Position
Canada Top Singles (RPM)	5
Canada Adult Contemporary (RPM)	7
US Billboard Hot 100	37
US Adult Contemporary (Billboard)	18
US Album Rock Tracks (Billboard)	18

=== Bob Seger version ===
==== Weekly charts ====
Chart (2011)	Peak position
US Adult Contemporary (Billboard)	17

==== Year-end charts ====
Chart (2011)	Position
US Adult Contemporary (Billboard)	46

== See also ==
- List of RPM number-one singles of 1990
- List of number-one adult contemporary singles of 1990 (U.S.)
- List of Billboard Mainstream Rock number-one songs of the 1990s
- List of train songs
