= Feel (Human Drama album) =

Studio album by Human Drama
- Released: 1989
- Recorded: 1988–1989
- Genre: Alternative rock, gothic rock
- Label: RCA Records
- Producer: Ian Broudie

Human Drama chronology
Hopes Prayers Dreams Heart Soul Mind Love Life Death (1988)	Feel (1989)	This Tangled Web/Times Square (1991)

Professional ratings
Review scores
Source	Rating
AllMusic	1.5/5 stars

Feel is the debut studio album by Human Drama, released by RCA Records in 1989. It was the band's only album for RCA; it was re-released by Johnny Indovina in 2008. Although the record failed commercially due the band being managed by the label as a college radio act, the album is now considered a seminal release in the American gothic rock movement and contains many staples of Human Drama's live performances from 1988 until the group disbanded in 2005, most noteworthy being "I Could Be a Killer", and "Death of an Angel".

== Recording and release ==
Following the release of Human Drama’s debut EP Hopes Prayers Dreams Heart Soul Mind Love Life Death in 1988, the band flew to Wales to work with Ian Broudie and engineer Paul Cobbold at Rockfield Studios.

The album was finished in Los Angeles and released in 1989 with a promotion focused in college rock radio, a strategy that the band firmly opposed. According to Johnny Indovina, the main songwriter in the band, "Sometimes I will think of this RCA opportunity that if I would have been just a touch more forceful and a little less trusting of the pros in the industry, it could have been a very different career now".

According to the band, RCA took the wrong approach to the album’s promotion and tried to break “Through My Eyes” at college radio before launching “Death of An Angel” as a major video and single. After the strategy failed, the label stopped promoting the album and dropped the band altogether from their roster.

== Critical reception ==
Metro Weekly called the album "a strong collection of highly emotional, introspective alternative rock."

AllMusic wrote that producer Ian Broudie "seems to have encouraged [Human Drama] to be a studio-slick commercial metal band as much as a dark collective, and as a result Feel has dated terribly, often striking melodies and songs ultimately quashed under the burden of some late-'80s record company executive's idea of commercial success."

== Track listing ==
1. "Death of an Angel"
2. "Never Never"
3. "I Could Be a Killer"
4. "Tumble"
5. "Through My Eyes"
6. "The Waiting Hour"
7. "Dying in a Moment of Splendor"
8. "Heaven on Earth"
9. "Old Man"
10. "There Is Only You"

2008 reissue bonus tracks

11. "I Bleed For You"
12. "Nothing I Judge"
13. "I Wish I Could See"
14. "A New Dawn"
15. "White River"
16. "Victims Of Time"
