= Human Drama =

American alternative rock band

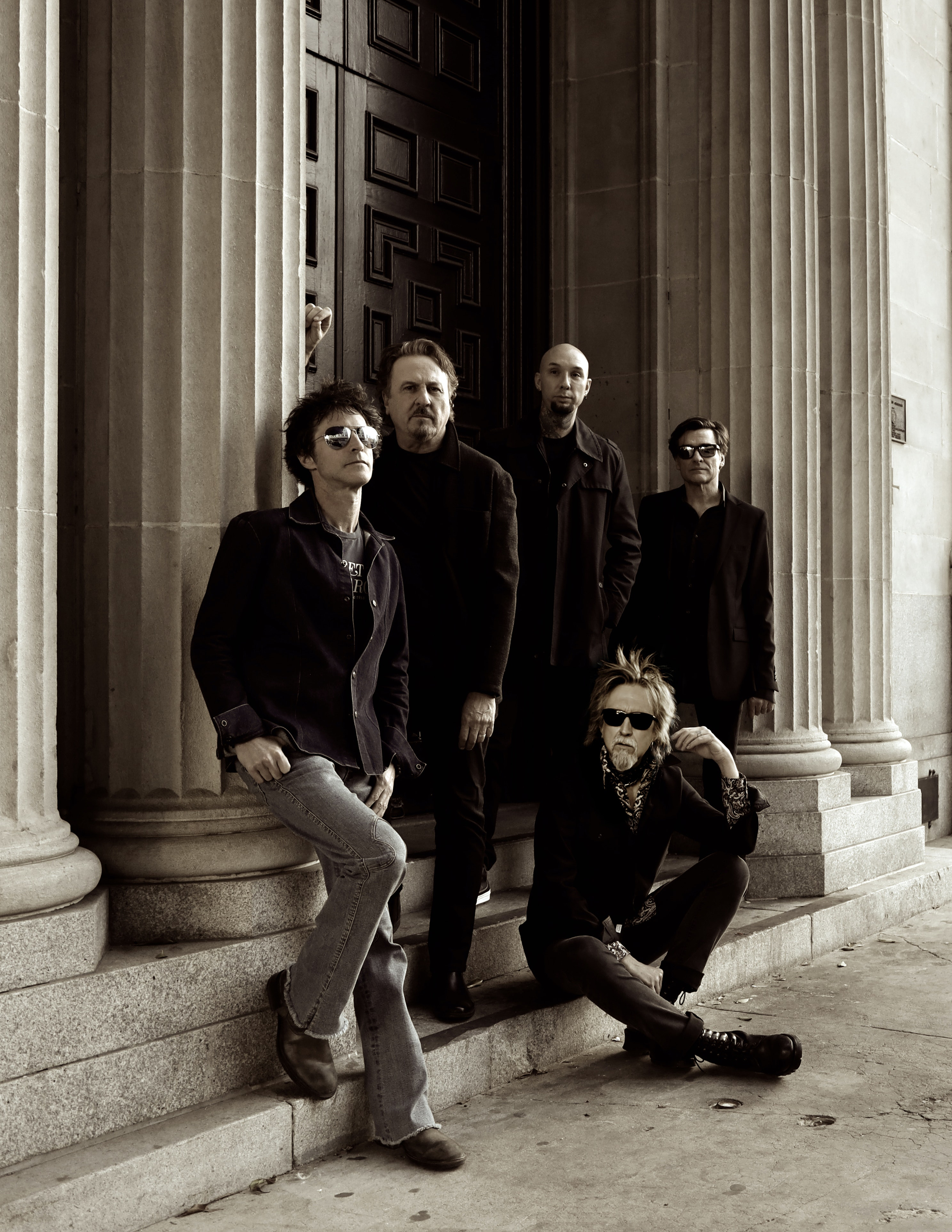
- Blurred Images Promotional Photo

Background information
- Origin: Los Angeles, California, United States
- Genres: Gothic rock; Art rock; Alternative rock
- Years active: 1985–2005, 2011-2012, 2015–present
- Labels: RCA Records; Triple X Projekt; Noise Kontrol (Mexico); Opcion Sonica (Mexico); The Orchard; Fonarte Latino (Mexico); Sunset Blvd Records; Bob Frank Entertainment
- Members: Johnny Indovina; Mark Balderas; Steve Fuxan; Tim Grove; Greg Collister
- Past members: Charlie Bouis; Michael Ciravolo; Jamii Szmadzinski; Rob Cournoyer; Michael Mallory; CJ Eriksson; Gerri Sutyak; Carlo Bartolini; Steve Caton; Rita D'Albert; Curt Harding; Edward Donato; Lyn Bertles; Renelle LaPlante
- Website: www.humandrama.net

Human Drama is an American alternative rock band led by singer/songwriter Johnny Indovina, formed in 1985. The band released six studio albums before splitting in 2005. They reformed for concerts in 2011 and 2012, and again in 2015. In 2017, they released their 1st studio album in 15 years, Broken Songs for Broken People followed by series of singles in 2019-2020, and new albums in 2021 and 2023.

== Human Drama (1985–2024) ==
The World Inside Promotional Photo

Indovina began his career in New Orleans in 1980 in the Models. with Indovina, Michael Ciravolo (guitar), Steve Fuxan (bass) and Charlie Bouis (drums). Upon relocating in the fall of 1985 to Los Angeles, they changed their name in 1986 to Human Drama with the addition of Mark Balderas (keyboards). Human Drama quickly became an integral part of the "Scream Scene" which developed around the underground LA club Scream.

Signed to RCA Records in 1988, Human Drama released an EP, Hopes Prayers Dreams Heart Soul Mind Love Life Death, and an album, Feel, a year later, both of which were produced by Ian Broudie (Echo and the Bunnymen, The Fall, The Lightning Seeds and many others).

Human Drama next signed to Triple X Records and released The World Inside in 1992. A video for "This Tangled Web" was directed by long-time friend and tour manager, Dave Eddy. The album proved so popular that Triple X eventually released a companion six-video compilation that featured detailed narration by Indovina.

Pinups, a collection of cover songs, was released in 1993, followed by the Human Drama EP in 1994 and Songs of Betrayal in 1995, both on Projekt Records. In 1998 14,384 Days Later, a live, career-spanning retrospective was released on both Hollow Hills/Triple X and the Mexican Opcion Sonica label. A book of Indovina's lyrics, My Bag of Secrets (The Words of Human Drama)|My Bag of Secrets...the Words of Human Drama, was published in 1997. The following year brought Solemn Sun Setting, the band's seventh album, and in 2000, Triple X released The Best of Human Drama...In a Perfect World.

Indovina then released Momento's En El Tiempo, the first live document of his solo acoustic shows. Produced by long-time Human Drama guitarist Michael Ciravolo, the disc was culled from several performances recorded between 1995 and 2000 in venues ranging from CBGB's in New York City to Café Bizarro in Mexico City.

The last album by Human Drama before the group disbanded in 2005 was Cause and Effect, released in the US on Projekt Records and in Latin America by Noise Kontrol.

In late 2006, Indovina formed a new band, Sound of the Blue Heart, releasing the albums Beauty? in 2006 and Wind of Change in 2009.

In 2011, Human Drama reunited for one concert in Hollywood, CA. In 2012, they performed in Mexico City at the Plaza Condesa. They recorded a new single in 2015, "The Liar Inside". Also that year Indovina released his first solo album, Trials of the Writer. In 2015 Human Drama performed in Mexico City at Circo Volador for a 30th Anniversary Concert.

In 2017, the band returned with Broken Songs for Broken People, their first album in 15 years, supported by 3 new videos for "The Liar Inside", "Rain on Me" and “Like this One”, followed in 2018 by concerts in Mexico City at Auditorio BB and in Los Angeles at Bar Sinister.

In 2019, Human Drama set out to record a series of eight singles that culminated in the 2021 album Blurred Images on Sunset Blvd. Records. In 2022, Human Drama performed The Trilogy Concert at Teatro Metropolitan in Mexico City, playing in their entirety the albums Pinups, The World Inside, and Cause and Effect. In July 2023, Human Drama released the album Ten Small Fractures on the Bob Frank Entertainment label.

== Discography ==
=== Albums ===
==== Studio albums ====
| Release Date | Title | Label |
|---|---|---|
| 1989 | Feel | RCA |
| 1992 | The World Inside | Triple X |
| 1993 | Pinups | Triple X |
| 1995 | Songs of Betrayal | Projekt |
| 1999 | Songs of Betrayal Part One | Triple X |
| 1999 | Songs of Betrayal Part Two | Triple X |
| 1999 | Solemn Sun Setting | Triple X |
| 2002 | Cause and Effect | Projekt |
| 2017 | Broken Songs for Broken People | Fonarte Latino |
| 2021 | Blurred Images | Sunset Blvd Records |
| 2023 | Ten Small Fractures | Bob Frank Entertainment |

==== Live albums ====
- Fourteen Thousand Three Hundred Eighty Four Days Later (1996), Triple X
- Momentos En El Tiempo (2002), Noise Kontrol -reissued 2005 as Moments in Time

==== Compilations ====
- The Best of Human Drama...In a Perfect World (2000), Triple X

=== EPs ===
- Hopes Prayers Dreams Heart Soul Mind Love Life Death (1989), RCA
- Human Drama (1994), Projekt

=== Singles ===
- ”This Tangled Web"/"Times Square (1990), Triple X
- ”Fascination and Fear"/"Fading Away" (1991), Triple X
- "Heroin"/"Never Never" (1998), Triple X
- "The Liar Inside" (2015), Dixsamdee Music BMI
- "Rain On Me" (2017) Fonarte Latino Records
- ”Farewell (version one) “ (2019) Fonarte Latino Records
- ”Delancey Street 1993“ (2019) Fonarte Latino Records
- ”One More Time Around The Lake” (2019) Fonarte Latino Records
- ”King Of Kings” (2019) Fonarte Latino Records
- ”Into Our Escape” (2020) Fonarte Latino Records
- ”Another Crash” (2020) Fonarte Latino Records
- "Let The Memories Live Here" (2020) Fonarte Latino Records
- "Sometimes" (2020) Fonarte Latino Records
- "February 10th" (2021) Sunset Blvd. Records
- "I'm Looking" (2021) Sunset Blvd. Records
- "He's Forgotten How to Dream" (2022) Sunset Blvd. Records
- "Father Sing" (2023) Bob Frank Entertainment
- "Dying in a Moment of Splendor" (2023) Bob Frank Entertainment
- "Tears" (2023) Bob Frank Entertainment

=== Compilation appearances ===
- Projekt 200 by Various Artist - Human Drama "The Waiting Hour (Once Again)"; Projekt Records 2007.
- Very Introspective Actually- A Pet Shop Boys Tribute - Human Drama "This Must Be The Place I've Waited Years To Leave"; Dancing Ferret Discs 2001.
- Orphee - Human Drama " A Single White Rose"; Projekt Records Compilation 2000.
- Songs from the Wasteland: A Tribute to The Mission - Human Drama " Kingdom Come"; Re-Constriction Records 1999.
- Death for Life A benefit compilation for AIDS research - Human Drama "Goodbye"; Mere Mortal Productions 1999.
- New Wave Goes To Hell - Human Drama "The Whole Of The Moon"; Cleopatra Records 1996.
- Beneath The Icy Floe - Human Drama "Sad I Cry"; Projekt Records 1995.
- Scream The Compilation - Human Drama "Wave Of Darkness"; Geffen Records 1987.

=== Videos/DVD ===
- The World Inside Video Collection (Video); Triple X
- Cynthia's Journal (Video) Projekt
- The Liar Inside (Video); The Orchard
- Rain On Me (Video); The Orchard
- Like this One (Video); The Orchard
- February 10 (Video); Sunset Blvd
- Into Our Escape (Video); Sunset Blvd
- I'm Looking (Video); Sunset Blvd
- Another Crash (Video); Sunset Blvd
- Dying in a Moment of Splendor (Video); The Orchard
- Death of an Angelo (Video); The Orchard

== Books ==
The book My Bag of Secrets (The Words of Human Drama) contains lyrics, photos and commentary from Johnny Indovina and his fans. It was published in 1997. An updated version was released on Amazon Books 2022.
