= Brilliant Live Adventures =

Brilliant Live Adventures [1995–1999]

Box set by David Bowie
- Released: 30 October 2020 – 2 April 2021
- Recorded: 1995–1999
- Genres: Rock; art rock; industrial rock; electronic rock
- Label: Parlophone
- Producer: David Bowie

David Bowie chronology
I'm Only Dancing (The Soul Tour 74) (2020)	Brilliant Live Adventures [1995–1999] (2020)	Brilliant Adventure (1992–2001) (2021)

David Bowie box set chronology
Conversation Piece (2019)	Brilliant Live Adventures [1995–1999] (2020)	Brilliant Adventure (1992–2001) (2021)

Brilliant Live Adventures [1995–1999] is a box set by English musician David Bowie, released incrementally throughout late 2020 and early 2021 as a series of six live albums taken from various concerts performed in support of Outside (1995), Earthling (1997) and Hours (1999). Named after the Hours song "Brilliant Adventure", the box set contains a mix of edited single shows and compilations from multiple concerts.

Initial pressings of the constituent albums sold out quickly, prompting label Parlophone to issue a second pressing to give more fans a chance to buy the albums on CD or vinyl.

== Initial announcement ==
In October 2020, a series of six live concert albums was announced by label Parlophone. These six albums would be released individually over the coming months, collectively forming a box-set. Empty boxes to hold the set of CDs or vinyl albums are sold separately.

The first album of the series would be Ouvrez le Chien, and subsequent albums were announced separately. The first three albums were released by the end of 2020, with the final three arriving in early 2021. All six albums were described as "limited one run only pressings" with 4,000 Vinyl and 6,000 CDs of each album pressed. In addition, the albums would be made available online via music streaming services.

== Ouvrez le Chien (Live Dallas 95) ==
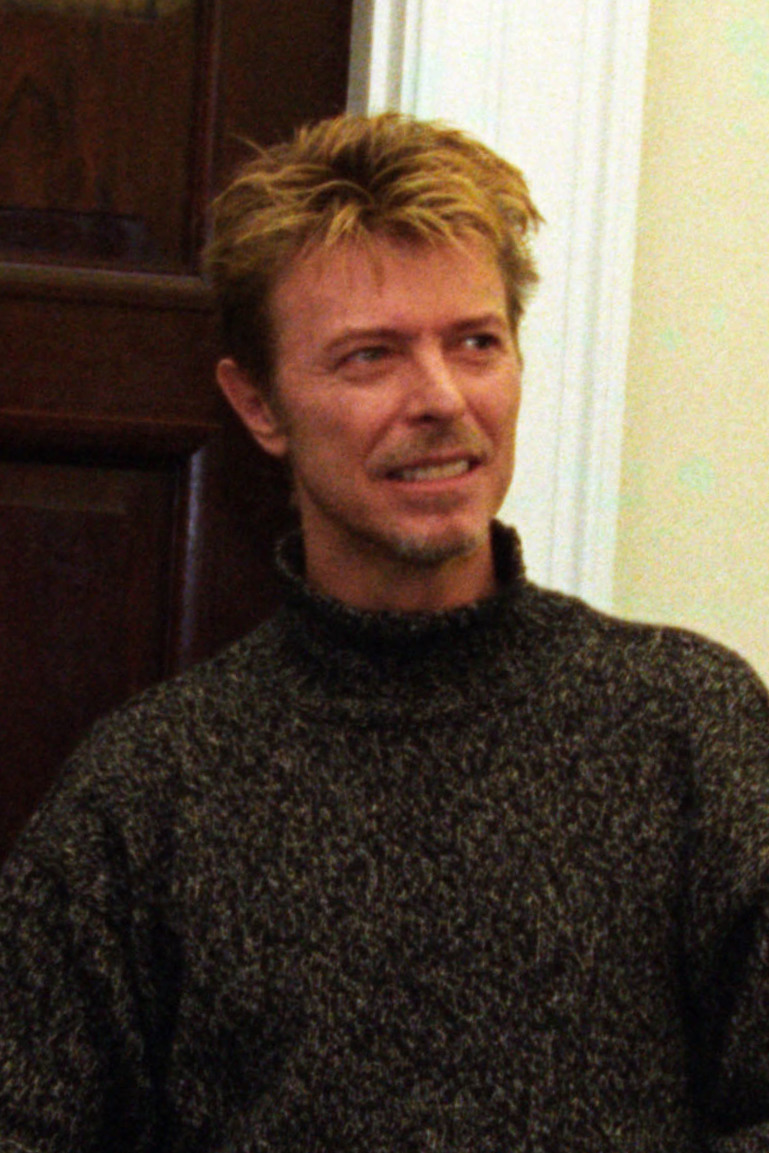
Bowie in 1995

The CD and vinyl versions of Ouvrez le Chien were released on 30 October 2020. However, the album had already been available via streaming services since July 2020. The album was recorded on the 13th October 1995 at the Starplex Amphitheatre, Dallas during Bowie's Outside Tour. The album is not a complete record of the show, five songs "Subterraneans"; "Scary Monsters (And Super Creeps)"; "Reptile"; "Hallo Spaceboy" and "Hurt" which Bowie performed with Nine Inch Nails are not included. "Ouvrez le Chien" is a partial lyric from Bowie's 1970 song "All the Madmen", which he repeated in his 1993 song "The Buddha of Suburbia", and during the tour, a sign with this lyric hung above the stage.

== No Trendy Réchauffé (Live Birmingham 95) ==
The second installment in the live album series, No Trendy Réchauffé, was announced on 9 November 2020. The physical format release was on 20 November 2020 with streaming from 12 March 2021. The album was recorded on the 13th December 1995 at the Big Twix Mix Show at the National Exhibition Centre (Hall 5) in Birmingham, UK and presents a slightly abridged festival-like-set list. "No Trendy Réchauffé" is a partial lyric from Bowie's 1993 song "Strangers When We Meet", which appears on this album.

== LiveAndWell.com ==
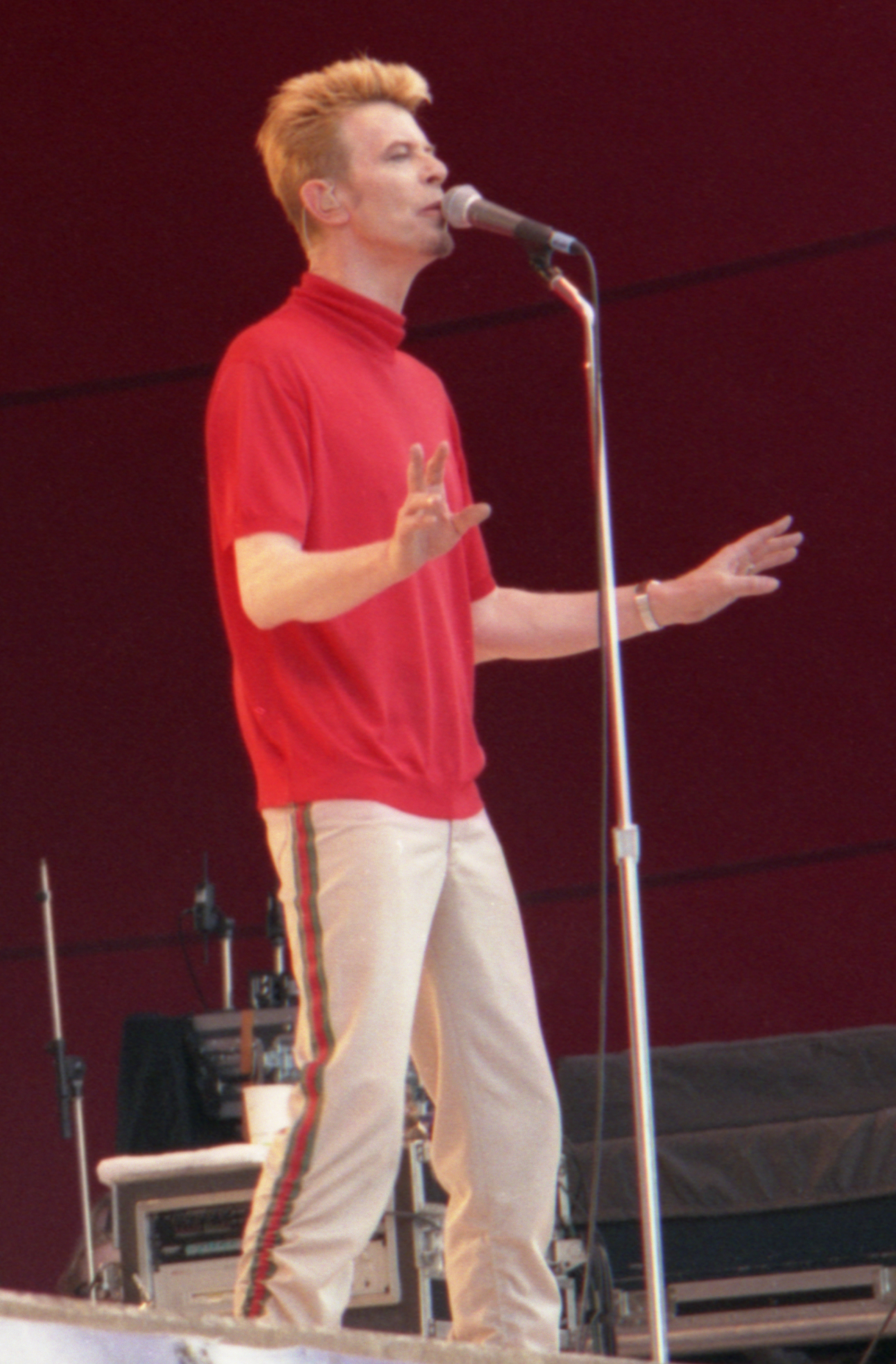
Bowie performing during his 1997 Earthling Tour

The third installment is a re-release of Bowie's 1999 album LiveAndWell.com. Announced on 11 December 2020, it was released on 15 January 2021. The album contains songs recorded during Bowie's 1997 Earthling Tour at a variety of venues. This marked the fourth release of this album, first given to BowieNet subscribers in 1999. The box set release lacks four remixes that previously appeared on a bonus disc in 2000.

== Look at the Moon! (Live Phoenix Festival 97) ==
Announced on 29 January 2021 and released on 12 February 2021. Look at the Moon! is a recording of Bowie's show at the Phoenix Festival, Long Marston, England on the 20 July 1997. The concert was one from Bowie's Earthling Tour, in support of his Earthling album. It contains the first physical format release of Bowie's cover of Laurie Anderson’s song "O Superman" (1981) with Gail Ann Dorsey on lead vocals.

== Something in the Air (Live Paris 99) ==
Something in the Air was announced on 24 February 2021 and released on 12 March. The concert, part of Bowie's short Hours Tour, was recorded on the 14th October 1999 at the Elysée Montmartre in Paris. Something In The Air has been available on streaming services since 2020, but this is the first time the recording was officially available on physical media.

== At the Kit Kat Klub (Live New York 99) ==
David Bowie At The Kit Kat Klub (Live New York 99) was announced on 17 March 2021 for release on 2 April 2021. The concert, part of Bowie's Hours Tour, was recorded and filmed on 19 November 1999 in front of an invite-only audience of fans and contest winners. The recording was webcast on 7 December 1999 as part of the American Express Blue Concert series via Liveonline.net and the audio recording was broadcast by SFX Radio network on the same date. An edited audio recording was officially released in 1999 as a 12-track promotional CD-R and three of the songs from the performance, "Seven"; "Something in the Air" and "The Pretty Things Are Going to Hell", appeared on the CD single of "Seven" (2000). The source for this release is the promotional CD-R and so once again this is an abridged recording. Five of the songs performed that night are missing: "Drive In Saturday"; "Cracked Actor"; "Ashes to Ashes"; "Repetition" and "Rebel Rebel".
