= ChangesNowBowie =

Live album by David Bowie
- Released: 17 April 2020
- Studios: Looking Glass Studios, New York
- Genre: Rock
- Length: 31:55
- Label: Parlophone
- Producers: David Bowie; Mark Plati; Reeves Gabrels

David Bowie chronology
Is It Any Wonder? (2020)	ChangesNowBowie (2020)	Ouvrez le Chien (Live Dallas 95) (2020)

ChangesNowBowie is an album composed of material recorded in live sessions in 1996 by English musician David Bowie. Initially released for streaming on 17 April 2020, the album also had a limited release for Record Store Day, 29 August 2020, on vinyl and CD. The album contains a set of recordings initially recorded for a BBC broadcast for Bowie's 50th birthday.

== Background ==
The recordings which became ChangesNowBowie were initially recorded in 1996, in preparation for a BBC broadcast. At the time, Bowie was preparing for his 50th birthday concert, which would be celebrated on 9 January 1997, at Madison Square Garden, New York, and it is from these rehearsals that the recordings were made. The show took place a day after Bowie's fiftieth birthday, featuring a number of guests such as the Foo Fighters, Sonic Youth, and Lou Reed.

The songs were initially broadcast, between segments of interviews not present on the release, on BBC Radio 1 on 8 January 1997, Bowie's birthday. ChangesNowBowie marks the first official release of these recordings.

== Recording ==
The recordings took place at Looking Glass Studios, New York, in 1996, and are mostly acoustic recordings of Bowie songs, with the exceptions of "White Light/White Heat" by The Velvet Underground and "Shopping for Girls" by Bowie's band, Tin Machine. Accompanying Bowie were Gail Ann Dorsey, Mark Plati, and Reeves Gabrels, all of whom spent a significant amount of time working with Bowie across his career. Both Plati and Gabrels, along with Bowie, acted as producers of the tracks.

== Track listing ==
=== Vinyl release ===
All tracks are written by David Bowie, except where noted.

Side one
No.	Title	Lyrics	Length
1.	"The Man Who Sold the World"		4:01
2.	"Aladdin Sane"		3:34
3.	"White Light/White Heat"	Lou Reed	3:43
4.	"Shopping for Girls"	David Bowie; Reeves Gabrels	3:31

Side two
No.	Title	Length
1.	"Lady Stardust"	3:32
2.	"The Supermen"	3:12
3.	"Repetition"	3:01
4.	"Andy Warhol"	2:35
5.	"Quicksand"	4:46

=== CD release ===
CD track listing
No.	Title	Lyrics	Length
1.	"The Man Who Sold the World"		4:01
2.	"Aladdin Sane"		3:34
3.	"White Light/White Heat"	Reed	3:43
4.	"Shopping for Girls"	Bowie; Gabrels	3:31
5.	"Lady Stardust"		3:32
6.	"The Supermen"		3:12
7.	"Repetition"		3:01
8.	"Andy Warhol"		2:35
9.	"Quicksand"		4:46

== Personnel ==
- David Bowie – vocals, producer
- Gail Ann Dorsey – bass, vocals
- Reeves Gabrels – guitar, producer
- Mark Plati – recording, mixing, producer, keyboards
- Ray Staff – mastering

== Charts ==
Chart performance for ChangesNowBowie
Chart (2020)	Peak position
Danish Albums (Hitlisten)	30
Dutch Albums (Album Top 100)	44
Irish Albums (Official Charts)	30
UK Albums (Official Charts)	17
