= Hallo Spaceboy =

1996 single by David Bowie

"Hallo Spaceboy" (Pet Shop Boys remix)

Single by David Bowie featuring Pet Shop Boys

from the album Outside
- B-side: "The Hearts Filthy Lesson"; "Under Pressure" (live); "Moonage Daydream" (live)
- Released: 19 February 1996
- Recorded: 1994; January 1995
- Studio: Mountain (Montreux); The Hit Factory (New York City)
- Genre: Industrial rock; electronica
- Length: 5:14 (album); 4:25 (Pet Shop Boys mix)
- Label: Arista; BMG; RCA; Virgin
- Songwriters: David Bowie; Brian Eno
- Producers: David Bowie; Brian Eno

David Bowie singles chronology
"Strangers When We Meet" (1995)	"Hallo Spaceboy" (Pet Shop Boys remix) (1996)	"Telling Lies" (1996)

Music video
- "Hallo Spaceboy" on YouTube

"Hallo Spaceboy" is a song by the English musician David Bowie from his 20th studio album, Outside (1995). It originated as an instrumental by Reeves Gabrels called "Moondust", which Bowie and Brian Eno stripped down and used to form the final track. An industrial rock and electronica track influenced by artists such as Nine Inch Nails, the song features synthesisers, loops and distorted guitar lines. The lyrics were influenced by the sound poet and painter Brion Gysin, and contain images of apocalypse and continue the androgynous lyrics of former Bowie songs such as "Rebel Rebel" and "Boys Keep Swinging".

For its release as the third and final single from Outside in February 1996, "Hallo Spaceboy" was remixed by the Pet Shop Boys, who added a disco sound and lyrics referencing the Major Tom character from Bowie's "Space Oddity". The single reached number 12 in the UK and charted in other European countries. In Israel, it became a number-one hit. Its accompanying music video, directed by David Mallet, mixes shots of both Bowie and Pet Shop Boys with footage of science fiction clips, atomic bomb testing footage and television advertising clips. Both versions of "Hallo Spaceboy" have been positively received and have appeared on lists of Bowie's best songs. Bowie performed "Hallo Spaceboy" frequently on his concert tours, recordings from which have appeared on live albums.

== Writing and recording ==
Written by David Bowie and Brian Eno, "Hallo Spaceboy" developed from an ambient instrumental piece written by the guitarist Reeves Gabrels called "Moondust". Initial work on the track began during a recording session at Mountain Studios in Montreux in 1994, shortly after the main sessions for the Leon project concluded. Bowie's biographers Nicholas Pegg and Chris O'Leary point to the influence of the poet and artist Brion Gysin, who developed a cut-up technique with William S. Burroughs that Bowie had, on several occasions, utilised for song lyrics. During the recording, Bowie spoke "If I fall, moondust will cover me", reportedly Gysin's final words before his death in 1986. Work halted on the track following the session, as Bowie believed "there wasn't anything special going on with that piece".

The track resurfaced on 17 January 1995 during the Outside sessions in New York City at The Hit Factory. Eno wrote in his diary that it was "stripped down to almost nothing [before] I wrote some lightning chords and space and suddenly, miraculously, we had something." The final track features Bowie, Eno, Gabrels, Carlos Alomar (guitar), Yossi Fine (bass), Mike Garson (piano) and Joey Baron (drums). After finishing the song, Bowie said, "I adore that track. In my mind, it was like Jim Morrison meets industrial. When I heard it back, I thought, 'Fuck me. It's like metal Doors.' It's an extraordinary sound." Gabrels later expressed disappointment in not receiving a co-writing credit for the song.

== Composition ==
Commentators have characterised "Hallo Spaceboy" as industrial rock and electronica. Pegg describes the song as "a hardcore maelstrom of sci-fi noise, hypnotic high-speed drumming and an insistent, speaker-hopping four-note guitar riff". The song's influences range from the Pixies and Pornography-era Cure to Nine Inch Nails and the Smashing Pumpkins; Bowie reportedly stated that he was aiming for a Nine Inch Nails-type sound. Featuring synthesisers, loops and distorted guitar lines, a few reviewers compared the song's sound to Bowie's 1974 album Diamond Dogs and his work with the rock band Tin Machine. The author Dave Thompson argued that the song would not have felt out of place as a bonus track on that album. Lyrically, Pegg states that "Hallo Spaceboy" captures the "millennial angst" of the Outside album and continues the androgynous lyrics of songs such as "Rebel Rebel" (1974) and "Boys Keep Swinging" (1979) with the line "Do you like girls or boys? / It's confusing these days". Some of the words and ideals, such as "chaos", "dust" and "hallo", and visions of a science fiction apocalypse were recycled from Tin Machine's "Baby Universal" (1991).

== Release and promotion ==
Outside was released on 5 September 1995, with "Hallo Spaceboy" sequenced as the sixth track. The song was a mainstay on Bowie's 1995 Outside Tour, and was often played with Nine Inch Nails and later as the closing track. Bowie intended "Hallo Spaceboy" to be his next single after "Strangers When We Meet". He performed the song twice in Birmingham and again on Jools Holland's Later... in late December the same year. The Birmingham performances were later released on the live album No Trendy Réchauffé (Live Birmingham 95) in 2020.

=== Pet Shop Boys remix ===
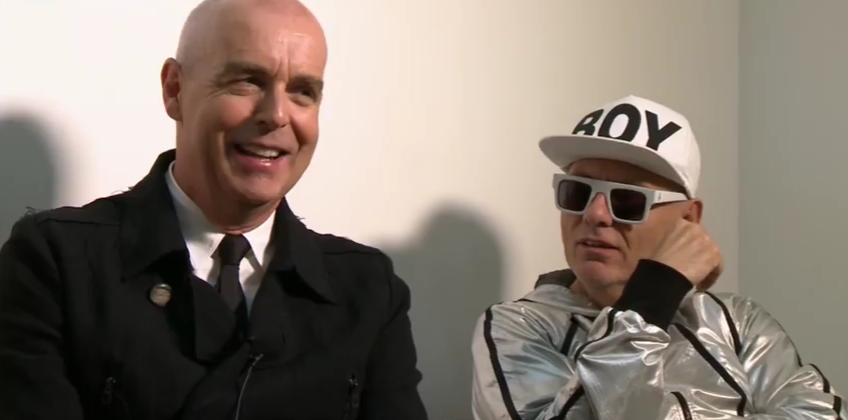
For its release as a single, "Hallo Spaceboy" was issued in remixed form featuring the English duo Pet Shop Boys (pictured in 2013).

Believing the original version of "Hallo Spaceboy" was unlikely to be commercially successful, Bowie commissioned Neil Tennant of the Pet Shop Boys to remix the song for release as the third single from Outside. As a lifelong Bowie fan, Tennant agreed and remixed the track at Mayfair Studios in London between 11–15 December 1995. Tennant replaced the song's anger with electronics and added Pet Shop Boys' signature backing vocals to the track. Since the original contained only a single verse, and a lyric featuring feelings of alienation, Tennant and his bandmate Chris Lowe added lyrical fragments from Bowie's 1969 song "Space Oddity", using a Gysin-style cut-up technique to create a second verse: "Ground to Major, bye bye Tom / dead the circuit, countdown's wrong / Planet Earth is control on?" O'Leary argues that the additions turned the song's cry of "this chaos is killing me" into a plea from an astronaut "strung out in heaven".

Bowie initially expressed reservation about the additions when Tennant told him during a telephone conversation, but later agreed that they worked well. Bowie rerecorded his lead vocal so the single became a duet with Tennant. Tennant told NME in a 1997 interview that he and Lowe, working alongside Bowie, had completed what Tennant called the "Major Tom trilogy", in reference to the fictional astronaut who first appeared in "Space Oddity" and later appeared in "Ashes to Ashes" (1980). Tennant explained, "I said to [Bowie], 'It's like Major Tom is in one of those Russian spaceships they can't afford to bring down,' and he said, 'Oh wow, is that where he is?'" Compared to the original version, the remix features a disco edge.

Released on 19 February 1996, the single was released through several formats, including a 7" single through BMG/RCA, a CD single through Arista/RCA and a 12" promo in the US through Virgin. The CD single was packaged with a reissue of "The Hearts Filthy Lesson" and live renditions of "Under Pressure" (1981) and "Moonage Daydream" (1972), recorded on the Outside Tour on 13 December 1995 in Birmingham. The single was a success across Europe, reaching number 12 in the UK, becoming Bowie's highest charting single since "Jump They Say" (1993). The remixed "Hallo Spaceboy" topped the singles chart in Latvia, further charting in Australia (36), Austria (37), Belgium Flanders (48) and Wallonia (30), Finland (8), Germany (59), Ireland (21), the Netherlands Top 40 and Single Top 100 (24 and 33, respectively), Scotland (10) and Sweden (12).

The music video for "Hallo Spaceboy" was directed by Bowie's longtime director David Mallet, mixing shots of both Bowie and Pet Shop Boys into a rapid-fire montage of Cold War era retro-footage of science fiction film clips, atomic bomb testing footage and television advertising clips. Bowie performed the song with Pet Shop Boys at the Brit Awards on 19 February 1996, and again on Top of the Pops on 1 March. According to O'Leary, Bowie "thrashed around" during these performances while Tennant sang calmly.

The Pet Shop Boys remix replaced "Wishful Beginnings" on the Outside – Version 2 album, and is included on some editions of the compilation albums Best of Bowie (2002), Nothing Has Changed (2014) and Legacy (The Very Best of David Bowie) (2016). The remix was later included on Re:Call 5, released as part of the Brilliant Adventure (1992–2001) box set in 2022. Four additional remixes, excluding the single one, were compiled on the 2004 two-disc edition of Outside. An extended Pet Shop Boys remix is included on their 2007 remix album Disco 4.

It was re-released on Record Store Day 2026 on neon pink 12" vinyl to celebrate the remix's 20th anniversary. This re-release caused the song to enter the Vinyl Singles Chart at number 4.

== Critical reception ==
Both versions of "Hallo Spaceboy" have received positive reviews from music critics and biographers. Discussing the original, the biographer Marc Spitz called it Bowie's "most convincing rocker" since "Rebel Rebel", and David Buckley said the track is "quite daring, with a hard, industrial menace and a great use of dynamics". Some have recognised the original as a highlight of the Outside album. AllMusic's Christian Huey said that the song was "the most successful spin since [1980's] Scary Monsters (and Super Creeps) on [Bowie's] recurring 'urban nightmare' motif." Alexis Petridis of The Guardian called the original "pummelling, chaotic and hypnotic". Paul Lester from Melody Maker said, "'Hallo Spaceboy', drenched in the theatrical mockneyisms that begat Damon Albarn and Brett Anderson, is trip hoppy (dub it up, Portishead!)" Roger Morton from NME declared it as "a viscerally thrilling glassed-guitar'n'driller rhythm rocker". Gareth Grundy from Select called the song a "new, quasi-industrial 'Space Oddity'".

Reviewing the Pet Shop Boys remix, Simon Price from Melody Maker said that "this sounds like the Pet Shop Boys without anything you could call a chorus. The bit where Bowie's gin-and-lemon voice mixes with Neil Tennant's Amaretto Disaronno on the line Do you like girls or boys? It's confusing these days... is one to hoist aloft around the room on a red velvet cushion, though." A reviewer from Music Week rated the song four out of five, writing that the song "has been transformed into a hi-NRG anthem with chart appeal to the max". The Observer's Neil Spencer similarly called the remix an "edgy, hi-energy affair" with which "the presence of Neil Tennant's solemn whine should assure Beckenham Dave of that elusive hit." Mojo magazine's Mark Paytress opined that adding Pet Shop Boys was a "masterstroke". Huey called the remix a success, with "less uncompromising" drama and "less disturbing" results.

"Hallo Spaceboy" has appeared on lists ranking Bowie's best songs by The Guardian (number 40) and Mojo (number 70). In 2016, Ultimate Classic Rock placed the single at number 79 (out of 119) in a list ranking every Bowie single from worst to best.

== Live performances ==
"Hallo Spaceboy" featured regularly on Bowie's setlists throughout 1996 and 1997, and made return appearances during his 2000 summer shows, 2002 Heathen and 2003–2004 A Reality tours. A version recorded on 18 July 1996 at the Phoenix Festival in England appeared on the BBC compilation Phoenix: The Album in 1997. A July 1997 recording from the Earthling Tour was also released on the live album Look at the Moon! in 2021, and 2 November recording in Rio de Janeiro from the same tour appeared on the live album LiveAndWell.com in 2000 (re-released in 2021). Pet Shop Boys also performed their own version of "Hallo Spaceboy" during their residency at London's Savoy Theatre in 1997.

At Bowie's fiftieth birthday concert in New York in January 1997, the song was performed together with Foo Fighters. Three years later, he performed it at the Glastonbury Festival on 25 June 2000, released in 2018 as Glastonbury 2000. Bowie performed the song live at BBC Radio Theatre, London, on 27 June 2000, and a recording of this performance was included on the bonus disc of Bowie at the Beeb in 2000; the full concert later appeared on Brilliant Adventure (1992–2001). A November 2003 performance from the A Reality Tour is included on the 2004 A Reality Tour DVD, and the 2010 A Reality Tour album. A previously unreleased performance from the Montreux Jazz Festival on 18 July 2002 was released on the box set I Can't Give Everything Away (2002–2016) in 2025.

== Personnel ==
According to Chris O'Leary:

- David Bowie – lead and backing vocals, baritone sax
- Brian Eno – synthesisers, drum machine
- Reeves Gabrels – lead guitar, loops, textures
- Carlos Alomar – rhythm guitar
- Yossi Fine – bass
- Mike Garson – keyboards
- Joey Baron – drums
- Neil Tennant – lead and backing vocals (remix)
- Chris Lowe – synthesisers, programming (remix)

Technical

- David Bowie – producer
- Brian Eno – producer
- David Richards – engineer

== Charts ==
=== Weekly charts ===
Weekly chart performance for "Hallo Spaceboy"
Chart (1996)	Peak position
Australia (ARIA)	36
Austria (Ö3 Austria Top 40)	37
Belgium (Ultratop 50 Flanders)	48
Belgium (Ultratop 50 Wallonia)	30
Finland (Suomen virallinen lista)	8
Germany (GfK)	59
Ireland (IRMA)	21
Israel (Israeli Singles Chart)	1
Netherlands (Dutch Top 40)	24
Netherlands (Single Top 100)	33
Scottish Singles Sales (Official Charts)	10
Sweden (Sverigetopplistan)	12
UK Singles (OCC)	12
US Dance Club Songs (Billboard)	40

Chart (2026)	Peak position
Croatian International Albums (HDU)	7
Greek Albums (IFPI)	69
Hungarian Physical Albums (MAHASZ)	20

=== Year-end charts ===
Year-end chart performance for "Hallo Spaceboy"
Chart (1996)	Position
Israel (Israeli Singles Chart)	33
