= I'm Only Dancing (The Soul Tour 74) =

2020 live album by David Bowie

Live album by David Bowie
- Released: 29 August 2020
- Recorded: 20 October & 30 November 1974
- Venues: Michigan Palace, Detroit, Michigan; Municipal Auditorium, Nashville, Tennessee
- Genres: Rock, soul
- Length: 86:12
- Label: Parlophone
- Producers: Aisha Cohen, Nigel Reeve

David Bowie chronology
Is It Any Wonder? (2020)	I'm Only Dancing (The Soul Tour 74) (2020)	Ouvrez le Chien (Live Dallas 95) (2020)

I'm Only Dancing (The Soul Tour 74) is a live album by the English musician David Bowie. It had a limited release on 29 August 2020 for Record Store Day as a double LP and double CD. It was recorded on the second half of the Diamond Dogs Tour in 1974, which is known as "the Soul Tour" due to the influence of the then-unreleased material Bowie had begun recording for Young Americans (1975). I'm Only Dancing marks the first time performances from this portion of the tour have been officially released.

== Background ==
David Bowie supported his eighth studio album Diamond Dogs on the Diamond Dogs Tour, the first leg of which lasted from 14 June to 20 July 1974. Co-designed and constructed by Chris Langhart, the tour featured elaborate set-pieces and cost $250,000. Films that influenced the design included Fritz Lang's Metropolis (1927) and Robert Wiene's The Cabinet of Dr. Caligari (1920). The second leg of the tour, lasting 2 September to 1 December 1974, has been nicknamed "the Soul Tour", due to the influence of the soul music Bowie had begun recording for Young Americans in August. Because of this, the shows were heavily altered, no longer featuring elaborate set-pieces, partly due to Bowie's exhaustion with the design and wanting to explore the new sound he was creating. The tour's lineup was also revamped to feature musicians who had recorded for Young Americans. Songs from the previous leg were dropped, while new ones (some from Young Americans) were added. Performances from the tour were previously released on two live albums, David Live and Cracked Actor (Live Los Angeles '74), which were released in 1974 and 2017, respectively. However, I'm Only Dancing (The Soul Tour 74) marks the first time performances from the "Soul" portion of the tour have been officially released.

== Recording ==
The majority of I'm Only Dancing (The Soul Tour 74) was recorded on 20 October 1974 at the Michigan Palace in Detroit, Michigan, while three tracks, "Knock on Wood", the medleys of "Footstompin'" / "I Wish I Could Shimmy Like My Sister Kate" / "Footstompin'" and "Diamond Dogs" / "It's Only Rock 'n Roll (But I Like It)" / "Diamond Dogs" were recorded on 30 November 1974 at the Municipal Auditorium in Nashville, Tennessee. According to Rolling Stone, the cover artwork mirrors the original design for the programs on the two recording dates.

== Track listing ==
=== Vinyl release ===
All tracks are written by David Bowie, except where noted.

Side one
No.	Title	Writer(s)	Length
1.	"Introduction / Memory of a Free Festival"		0:30
2.	"Rebel Rebel"		2:46
3.	"John, I'm Only Dancing (Again)"		6:34
4.	"Sorrow"	Bob Feldman, Jerry Goldstein, Richard Gottehrer	3:12
5.	"Changes"		3:28
6.	"1984"		2:51

Side two
No.	Title	Writer(s)	Length
1.	"Moonage Daydream"		5:04
2.	"Rock 'n' Roll with Me"	Bowie, Warren Peace	5:04
3.	"Love Me Do" / "The Jean Genie"	Lennon–McCartney, Bowie	6:32
4.	"Young Americans"		4:45

Side three
No.	Title	Length
1.	"Can You Hear Me?"	5:54
2.	"It's Gonna Be Me"	6:53
3.	"Somebody Up There Likes Me"	5:31
4.	"Suffragette City"	3:49

Side four
No.	Title	Writer(s)	Length
1.	"Rock 'n' Roll Suicide"		5:55
2.	"Panic in Detroit"		4:29
3.	"Knock on Wood" (*)	Eddie Floyd, Steve Cropper	2:58
4.	"Footstompin'" / "I Wish I Could Shimmy Like My Sister Kate" / "Footstompin'" (*)	Aaron Collins, Ande Rand, Armand Piron, Clarence Williams	3:08
5.	"Diamond Dogs" / "It's Only Rock 'n Roll (But I Like It)" / "Diamond Dogs" (*)	Bowie, Jagger–Richards	6:57

=== CD release ===
Disc one
No.	Title	Writer(s)	Length
1.	"Introduction / Memory of a Free Festival"
2.	"Rebel Rebel"
3.	"John, I'm Only Dancing (Again)"
4.	"Sorrow"	Bob Feldman, Jerry Goldstein, Richard Gottehrer
5.	"Changes"
6.	"1984"
7.	"Moonage Daydream"
8.	"Rock 'n' Roll with Me"	Bowie, Warren Peace
9.	"Love Me Do" / "The Jean Genie"	Lennon–McCartney, Bowie
10.	"Young Americans"

Disc two
No.	Title	Writer(s)	Length
1.	"Can You Hear Me?"
2.	"It's Gonna Be Me"
3.	"Somebody Up There Likes Me"
4.	"Suffragette City"
5.	"Rock 'n' Roll Suicide"
6.	"Panic in Detroit"
7.	"Knock on Wood" (*)	Eddie Floyd, Steve Cropper
8.	"Footstompin'" / "I Wish I Could Shimmy Like My Sister Kate" / "Footstompin'" (*)	Aaron Collins, Ande Rand, Armand Piron, Clarence Williams
9.	"Diamond Dogs" / "It's Only Rock 'n Roll (But I Like It)" / "Diamond Dogs" (*)	Bowie, Jagger–Richards

Recorded at the Michigan Palace, Detroit on 20 October 1974.
Tracks marked with * recorded at the Municipal Auditorium, Nashville on 30 November 1974.

== Personnel ==
Per davidbowie.com.

- David Bowie – vocals, 12-string acoustic guitar, harmonica
- Earl Slick – guitar
- Carlos Alomar – guitar
- Mike Garson – piano, Mellotron
- David Sanborn – alto saxophone, flute
- Pablo Rosario – percussion
- Emir Ksasan – bass
- Dennis Davis – drums
- Warren Peace – backing vocals
- Anthony Hinton – backing vocals
- Luther Vandross – backing vocals
- Ava Cherry – backing vocals
- Robin Clark – backing vocals
- Diane Sumler – backing vocals

== Charts ==
Chart (2020)	Peak position
Croatian International Albums (HDU)	1
Hungarian Albums (MAHASZ)	16
Irish Albums (Official Charts)	21
Scottish Albums (Official Charts)	10
UK Albums (OCC)	18
US Billboard 200	104
US Top Alternative Albums (Billboard)	12
US Top Rock Albums (Billboard)	16
