= The Man Who Sold the World (song) =

1970 song by David Bowie

Song by David Bowie

from the album The Man Who Sold the World
- A-side: "Life on Mars?"
- Released: 4 November 1970
- Recorded: 4 & 22 May 1970
- Studio: Trident & Advision, London
- Genre: Psychedelic rock; hard rock
- Length: 3:58
- Label: Mercury
- Songwriter: David Bowie
- Producer: Tony Visconti

Lyric video
- "The Man Who Sold The World" on YouTube

"The Man Who Sold the World" is a song by the English musician David Bowie from his third studio album of the same name. Produced by Tony Visconti, the track was recorded at Trident and Advision Studios in London in May 1970, towards the end of the album's recording sessions. Bowie recorded his vocal on the final day of mixing for the album, reflecting his generally dismissive attitude during the sessions. Musically, it is based around a "circular" guitar riff from Mick Ronson. A psychedelic rock and hard rock song, its lyrics are cryptic and evocative, being inspired by numerous poems, including the 1899 "Antigonish" by William Hughes Mearns. Bowie's vocals are heavily "phased" throughout and have been described as "haunting".

"The Man Who Sold the World" was released in November 1970 in the United States and in April 1971 in the United Kingdom by Mercury Records. It was not released as a single by Bowie, though it appeared as a B-side on the 1973 reissues of "Space Oddity" in the US and "Life on Mars?" in the UK by RCA Records. It was not until it was covered by the Scottish singer Lulu, whose 1974 recording, produced by Bowie and Ronson, peaked at No. 3 on the UK Singles Chart, that the song gained mainstream attention. In subsequent decades, the song has been covered by Scottish musician Midge Ure in 1982, and in 1993 by Nirvana.

Retrospectively, Bowie's original recording has been named one of his best songs, with reviewers praising its haunting and unsettling atmosphere. Later in his career, Bowie's live performances would include notable differences from original recording. This included a markedly darker style during 1995's Outside Tour; a studio recording of the tour's arrangement appeared as a B-side of "Strangers When We Meet" in 1995. He again rerecorded the song in an acoustic arrangement in 1996 for the documentary ChangesNowBowie; which was released in 2020 on the digital version of the EP Is It Any Wonder? and on the album ChangesNowBowie. The original recording has appeared on multiple compilation albums and has been remastered multiple times, including in 2015 as part of the box set Five Years (1969–1973).

== Composition and recording ==
The backing track for "The Man Who Sold the World" was recorded at Trident Studios in London on 4 May 1970, along with other album track "Running Gun Blues". At this point, the track was recorded under the working title "Saviour Machine" and did not contain the title phrase. The lineup featured David Bowie on acoustic guitar, Mick Ronson on electric guitar, producer Tony Visconti on bass, Woody Woodmansey on drums and percussion, and Ralph Mace on Moog synthesiser; Ronson and Woodmansey would later become famous as a part of the Spiders from Mars. According to Visconti, Bowie recorded his vocals on 22 May at Advision Studios, the final day of mixing for the album which, when traveling to Advision, Bowie had originally intended to name Metrobolist in homage to Fritz Lang's 1927 film Metropolis. Chris O'Leary writes that Bowie wrote the lyrics in the reception area of the studio while Visconti waited at the mixing console. Once Bowie finished, he quickly recorded his vocal and Visconti added a "flange" effect and mixed the track in a few hours, sending the tapes to the label later that night. Bowie's last-minute addition frustrated Visconti, who recalled in 1977: "This was the beginning of [Bowie's] new style of writing – 'I can't be bothered until I have to'. When it was finished, on the last day of the last mix, I remember telling David, 'I've had it, I can't work like this anymore – I'm through' ... David was very disappointed." Visconti's frustration was due in part to his dissatisfaction with the recording sessions: as producer he was mostly in charge of budget and production, as well as maintaining Bowie's interest in the project. In 1976, Bowie would tell BBC Radio 1's Stuart Grundy in that: "It was a nightmare, that album. I hated the actual process of making it."

The end result was something highly unusual. It was described by music critic Peter Doggett as "enigmatic", while Nicholas Pegg described it as giving an "unassuming air of pathos and menace". Doggett notes that the track contains none of the "metallic theatrics" that are found on the rest of the album. Musically, the song opens with a repeating electric guitar riff from Ronson with an acoustic guitar from Bowie underneath it. The electric bass and Moog synthesiser notwithstanding, O'Leary writes that apart from Ronson's electric guitar, the song is primarily acoustic. The chord structure is in the key of F with an A major chord "borrowed" from the D minor scale, similar to the track "All the Madmen" off the same album. Throughout the song, Visconti's bass "runs scales" under the chorus and a melody "elsewhere", Woodmansey plays "ecstatic" drum fills deep in the mix and Latin-style percussion "trembling" on the surface, while Ronson uses feedback to introduce the chorus. Bowie's vocals are "heavily phased" during the verses and briefly doubled (which, in Bowie's words, "came as some surprise" in post), compressed and again double-tracked during the chorus. Douglas Wolk of Rolling Stone similarly calls Bowie's vocals and lyrics "haunting". Pegg describes the guiro percussion as "sinister", the guitar riff "circular" and Bowie's vocal "ghostly". The tracks ends with a coda in D minor containing wordless vocals, described by Doggett as a "haunting chorale" and by O'Leary as "ominous". Musically, "The Man Who Sold the World" has been described as a psychedelic rock and hard rock song, with a length of three minutes and fifty-eight seconds.

== Title and lyrics ==
I guess I wrote it because there was a part of myself that I was looking for … that song for me always exemplified kind of how you feel when you're young, when you know there's a piece of yourself that you haven't really put together yet – you have this great searching, this great need to find out who you really are.

— David Bowie, in an interview for the BBC Radio 1 programme ChangesNowBowie (1997)

According to Doggett, the song's title has "precursors", including a 1949 Robert A. Heinlein science fiction novella The Man Who Sold the Moon; a 1954 DC comic, "The Man Who Sold the Earth"; and a 1968 Brazilian political satire, The Man Who Bought the World. None of these have a thematic link to Bowie's song. Pegg suggests that the title partly reflects an element of "self-disgust" Bowie has over the thought of "losing control" and "selling" his private life via profoundly personal music.

The lyrics are cryptic and evocative; in Doggett's words, "begging but defying interpretation." Like most of his work during this period, Bowie frequently avoided giving a direct interpretation of the lyrics. He later remarked that he felt it was unfair to give it to Lulu in 1973 because it dealt with the "devils and angels" within himself. Bowie once stated that the song was a sequel to "Space Oddity" which, in Doggett's words, is "an explanation designed to distract rather than enlighten", quoting the lyrics "Who knows? Not me". The song's narrator has an encounter with a kind of doppelgänger, as suggested in the second chorus where "I never lost control" is replaced with "We never lost control". Beyond this, the episode is unexplained: as James E. Perone wrote "Bowie encounters the title character, but it is not clear just what the phrase means, or exactly who this man is. ... The main thing that the song does is to paint – however elusively – the title character as another example of the societal outcasts who populate the album."

In common with several tracks on the album, the song's themes have been compared to the horror-fantasy works of H. P. Lovecraft. The lyrics are also cited as reflecting Bowie's concerns with family problems and splintered or multiple personalities and are believed to have been partially inspired by the poem "Antigonish" by William Hughes Mearns: "As I was going up the stair / I met a man who wasn't there / He wasn't there again today / I wish, I wish he'd stay away..." By claiming he "wasn't there", Bowie "compounds" the identity crisis while believing his companion "died alone, a long, long time ago." Pegg writes that the "defacement of the individual" and "dread of mortality" provide "grim counterparts" to the "immortal anguish" of fellow album track "The Supermen" and the meditations on "impermanence" and "rebirth" in "After All".

== Release and reception ==
The Man Who Sold the World was released in November 1970 through Mercury Records as Bowie's third studio album, with "The Man Who Sold the World" released as the eighth and penultimate track, sequenced between "She Shook Me Cold" and "The Supermen". Although no singles were issued from the album, the song appeared as the B-side on the 1973 reissue US single release of "Space Oddity" and UK single release of "Life on Mars?", both by RCA Records.

Retrospectively, Bowie's original recording has been named one of his best songs, with many praising the haunting and unsettling nature of the recording. Following Bowie's death in 2016, Rolling Stone listed the song as one of his 30 essential songs. The same year, Ultimate Classic Rock, in their list of Bowie's ten best songs, listed "The Man Who Sold the World" at number 10, calling it "one of his most haunting songs of all time". They subsequently commended Lulu and Nirvana's cover versions for helping bring the song into the mainstream. In 2018, NME, in their list of Bowie's 40 greatest songs, ranked "The Man Who Sold the World" number 17, writing, "[The track] is not just a vintage slice of Bowie story-telling but a key part in his '90s renaissance, 20 years later", due in part to Nirvana's cover, which appeared at a time when "Bowie's critical stock was at a career-low ... coming after Bowie's late-'80s run of maligned albums." In 2020, Alexis Petridis of The Guardian ranked the song 23rd in a list of Bowie's 50 greatest songs, writing, "The title track of his eeriest album remains mysterious, creepy and haunting 50 years on."

== Legacy ==
Bowie's original recording of "The Man Who Sold the World" has been released on compilation albums, including The Best of David Bowie 1969/1974 (1997), Best of Bowie (2002), Nothing Has Changed (2014) and Legacy (2016). The song, along with its parent album, has been remastered multiple times, including in 2015 as part of the box set Five Years (1969–1973). Bowie performed the song on numerous occasions. He appeared on the American television programme Saturday Night Live in December 1979, performing the song with Klaus Nomi and Joey Arias. Pegg calls this version "superb". He performed the song during his summer 2000 Mini Tour, including at the BBC Radio Theatre in London and at the Glastonbury Festival. Performances from these venues have been released on Bowie at the Beeb (2000) and Glastonbury 2000 (2018), respectively. A performance from the Reality Tour is featured on the live album A Reality Tour (2010).

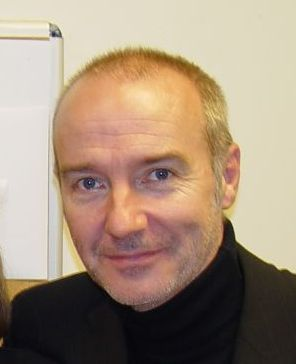
Scottish musician Midge Ure's cover was featured in Metal Gear Solid V: The Phantom Pain.

The song has been covered by hundreds of artists, with many noting that certain covers have managed to outshine the popularity of Bowie's original recording. Scottish singer Lulu recorded a version in 1974 that was produced by Bowie and Ronson and later became a top ten hit on the UK singles chart. Scottish musician Midge Ure recorded a version for the soundtrack to the 1983 film Party Party, though it mainly gained popularity through its inclusion in the 2015 video game Metal Gear Solid V: The Phantom Pain. American rock band Nirvana performed the song for the television program MTV Unplugged in 1993, introducing it to a new audience. Speaking about Lulu's recording, Bowie recalled in 2002, "I still have a very soft spot for [Lulu's] version, though to have the same song covered by both Lulu and Nirvana still bemuses me to this day". AllMusic's Dave Thompson argues that the Lulu, Midge Ure and Nirvana recordings have managed to "establish the song at the very forefront of Bowie's canon." Pegg writes that the popularity of its covers have made listeners unaware that Bowie wrote the song. However, Alexis Petridis of The Guardian argues that although subsequent covers have tended to outshine Bowie's original in terms of popularity, none have ever matched the quality of the original.

Bowie re-recorded "The Man Who Sold the World" on many occasions. For performances on the Outside Tour, it was performed in what Pegg calls a "radical trip-hop revamp". Bowie recorded a live version of the song and was reshaped, overdubbed and mixed by Brian Eno, which appeared as the B-side of the CD single "Strangers When We Meet" (1995) and later was remastered for digital and physical versions of the EP Is It Any Wonder? (2020). Following mixing in late October 1995, Eno wrote in his diary, "down to Westside to mix David’s live version of ‘The Man Who Sold The World’ – and what a great version. It sounds completely contemporary. I added some backing vocals and a sonar blip and sculpted the piece a little so that there was more contour to it." Other live versions of this version of the song from 1995 were released in 2020 as part of the concert albums Ouvre le Chien (Live Dallas 95) and No Trendy Réchauffé (Live Birmingham 95). Another live version recorded in 1997 during Bowie's Earthling Tour was released in 2021 on the live album Look at the Moon! In 2020, on what would have been Bowie's 73rd birthday, a previously unreleased acoustic version, recorded for the ChangesNowBowie documentary in 1996 during the Earthling sessions, was released. According to Jon Blistein of Rolling Stone, this version has "a lighter touch, with that famous serpentine guitar riff slinking around a steady acoustic strum and slowly swelling synths." It features Gail Ann Dorsey on bass and vocals, Reeves Gabrels (whom Bowie collaborated with in the band Tin Machine) on guitar, and Mark Plati on keyboards and programming. This version was released on the digital version of Is It Any Wonder? in February 2020, and was additionally released on the live album, ChangesNowBowie, in August. Stephen Thomas Erlewine, writing for Pitchfork, described the re-recording as "a nod to Nirvana popularising the song a few years earlier".

== Personnel ==
According to Kevin Cann:

- David Bowie – lead vocals, acoustic guitar
- Mick Ronson – electric guitar
- Tony Visconti – bass guitar
- Woody Woodmansey – drums, percussion
- Ralph Mace – Moog synthesiser

== Certifications ==
Region	Certification	Certified units/sales
New Zealand (RMNZ)	Gold	15,000^{‡}
United Kingdom (BPI)	Silver	200,000^{‡}
^{‡} Sales+streaming figures based on certification alone.

== Lulu version ==
"The Man Who Sold the World"
- A-side label of the UK single

Single by Lulu

from the album Heaven and Earth and the Stars
- B-side: "Watch That Man"
- Released: 11 January 1974
- Recorded: 16 July 1973
- Studio: Château d'Hérouville, Hérouville, France
- Genre: Pop-soul; pop
- Label: Polydor
- Songwriter: David Bowie
- Producers: David Bowie; Mick Ronson

Lulu singles chronology
"Make Believe World" (1972)	"The Man Who Sold the World" (1974)	"The Man with the Golden Gun" (1974)

Official audio
- "The Man Who Sold the World" on YouTube

The song was covered by the Scottish singer Lulu in 1974, who, according to biographer David Buckley, performed it in "a sleazy, almost Berlin cabaret style". Chris O'Leary categorises her rendition as "glam-disco" and calls it "loud, captivating and distorting." Lulu would recall David Bowie inviting her to a concert he gave after which he met her in his hotel room saying: "I want to make a MF of a record with you [because] you're a great singer." Lulu – "I didn't think it would happen but [Bowie] followed up two days later. He was übercool at the time and I just wanted to be led by him. I loved everything he did. I didn't think 'The Man Who Sold the World' was the greatest song for my voice, but it was such a strong song in itself. I had no idea what it was about. In the studio, Bowie kept telling me to smoke more cigarettes, to give my voice a certain quality."

Regarding meeting her in the "Last Supper" at the Hotel Café Royal, Bowie later said, "We started talking about the possibility of working together. I was keen to get something fixed up, because I really have always thought that Lulu has incredible potential as a rock singer. I didn't think this potential had been fully realised...we decided on 'The Man Who Sold the World' as being most suitable." Bowie produced Lulu's recording of "The Man Who Sold the World" with Mick Ronson during the July 1973 Pin Ups sessions at the Château d'Hérouville in Hérouville, France and also contributed saxophone and backing vocals. The remainder of the band included Ronson on guitar, Trevor Bolder on bass, Mike Garson on piano, and Aynsley Dunbar on drums. Bowie added saxophone overdubs and oversaw the final mix at Olympic Studios in London during the Diamond Dogs sessions. According to O'Leary, Bowie had Lulu smoke cigarettes in between takes to "abrade" her voice.

Lulu's version of "The Man Who Sold the World" was recorded on 16 July 1973, and was released as a single on 11 January 1974 by Polydor Records (as 2001 490), with a cover of Bowie's Aladdin Sane track "Watch That Man" as the B-side. She promoted her version with an appearance on the British television programme Top of the Pops on 10 January, in which she performed in a charcoal suit and gangster hat. According to Nicholas Pegg, this outfit bore a "remarkable resemblance" to the wardrobe of Bowie's future persona The Thin White Duke. Neil Bartlett characterised her performances as "dressed and sounding exactly like a diminutive Bowie". Her performances helped the single peak at No. 3 on the UK Singles Chart, as well as No. 8 on the Irish Singles Chart, and No. 24 and 10 on the Belgian and Netherlands Singles Charts, respectively. O'Leary writes that the single charted higher than almost all of Bowie's 1970s singles and made his original recording "seem like a demo".

=== Personnel ===
According to Roy Carr and Charles Shaar Murray:

- Lulu – lead vocals
- David Bowie – saxophone, backing vocals
- Mick Ronson – guitars
- Trevor Bolder – bass guitar
- Mike Garson – piano
- Aynsley Dunbar – drums

=== Chart positions ===
Chart (1974)	Peak position
Australia (Kent Music Report)	81
Belgian Singles Chart (Ultratop)	24
Netherlands Singles Chart	10
New Zealand (Listener)	6
Irish Singles Chart	8
UK Singles Chart (Official Charts Company)	3

== Nirvana version ==
"The Man Who Sold the World"
- 1995 CD promo single

Promotional single by Nirvana

from the album MTV Unplugged in New York
- Released: 1995
- Recorded: 18 November 1993
- Studio: Sony Music, New York City
- Genre: Acoustic rock
- Length: 4:20
- Label: DGC
- Songwriter: David Bowie
- Producers: Alex Coletti; Scott Litt; Nirvana

Nirvana singles chronology
"Polly" (1994)	"The Man Who Sold the World" (1995)	"Where Did You Sleep Last Night" (1995)

Live performance
- "The Man Who Sold the World" (MTV Unplugged) on YouTube

=== Recording ===
In his journals, Kurt Cobain, frontman of the American grunge band Nirvana, ranked The Man Who Sold the World at number 45 out of 50 in his top favourite albums. Cobain and bassist Krist Novoselic were introduced to The Man Who Sold the World by one of their drummers Chad Channing, who bought a used LP version and converted it to cassette. Cobain found great interest in the title track and was surprised to learn it was by David Bowie. Nirvana subsequently recorded a live rendition of the song during their MTV Unplugged appearance at Sony Music Studios in New York City on 18 November 1993 and included it on their MTV Unplugged in New York album the following year. The song was also released as a promotional single for the album in 1995. Chris O'Leary notes that rather than play acoustic versions of their more popular songs, such as "Smells Like Teen Spirit", the band instead opted for relatively obscure cover versions, including "The Man Who Sold the World", which at the time, was considered a Bowie outtake by MTV standards.

For their performance, Cobain ran his acoustic guitar through a fuzz box that he could trigger with a pedal, allowing the guitar to sound electric. Nirvana's cover received considerable airplay on alternative rock radio stations and was also placed into heavy rotation on MTV in the US, peaking at number 3 on MTV's most played videos on 18 February 1995; it also peaked for two weeks at number 7 on Canada's MuchMusic Countdown in March 1995. The video was also placed into heavy rotation on MTV Europe. Nirvana regularly covered the song during live sets after their MTV Unplugged performance up until Cobain's death in 1994. Following Cobain's death, O'Leary states that the group's performance of "The Man Who Sold the World" became Cobain's "ghost song". The song was re-released on Nirvana's self-titled greatest hits compilation in 2002. Douglas Wolk of Pitchfork argues that the song "didn't really become a standard" until Nirvana covered it.

=== Reception, legacy, and other versions ===
Brian Kachejian of Classic Rock History called their performance of the song "haunting" and "mesmerising". He writes, "Cobain's haunting vocals overtook and descended the Bowie lyric into an arena of darkness and hallucination that seemed to be Bowie's original intent. [The presence of the Meat Puppets' Cris and Curt Kirkwood], along with Cobain's lyrical phrasing and gritty yet humbling resonance, left the audience spellbound." Stephen Thomas Erlewine of AllMusic, in his review of MTV Unplugged, wrote: "No other band could have offered covers of David Bowie's "The Man Who Sold the World" and the folk standard "Where Did You Sleep Last Night" on the same record, turning in chilling performances of both – performances that reveal as much as their original songs."

Bowie said of Nirvana's cover: "I was simply blown away when I found that Kurt Cobain liked my work, and have always wanted to talk to him about his reasons for covering 'The Man Who Sold the World'" and that "it was a good straight forward rendition and sounded somehow very honest. It would have been nice to have worked with him, but just talking with him would have been real cool." Bowie called Nirvana's cover "heartfelt", noting that "until this [cover], it hadn't occurred to me that I was part of America's musical landscape. I always felt my weight in Europe, but not [in the US]." In the wake of its release, Bowie bemoaned the fact that when he performed the number himself, he would encounter "kids that come up afterwards and say, 'It's cool you're doing a Nirvana song.' And I think, 'Fuck you, you little tosser!'" Rolling Stone added: "If the mark of a good cover is that people do not even realise it's a cover, Nirvana certainly did a good job" and that "The song also took on new meaning after Cobain died. This was a man with the world at his finger tips, and he gave it all up". The magazine ranked Nirvana's version number one in a reader's poll of the greatest live cover songs. It was also voted in at number 1 on Poland's LP3 chart in 1995. In 2008, Nirvana's version was voted fourth best cover song in a poll by Total Guitar.

At a pre–Grammy Awards party on 14 February 2016 for the 58th Annual Grammy Awards, surviving Nirvana band members Krist Novoselic, Dave Grohl, and Pat Smear teamed up with contemporary Beck to perform "The Man Who Sold the World" in tribute to Bowie–who had died the month before—with Beck performing vocals. To mark what would have been Kurt Cobain's 50th birthday, in 2017 the Phonographic Performance Limited released a list of the twenty most-played Nirvana songs on TV and radio in the UK; "The Man Who Sold the World" ranked at number six.

In 2013, an electric guitar version appeared on Nirvana's Live and Loud video album, which was also released digitally and on vinyl in 2019. Later the same year, a rehearsal performance for their MTV Unplugged set was released on the 25th anniversary digital and vinyl editions of the album, and had only previously been available on the DVD version that was released in 2007. On 4 January 2020, the surviving members of Nirvana again teamed up with Beck on vocals and St. Vincent on guitar to perform the song at a charity event for The Art of Elysium's annual Heaven gala.

=== Accolades ===
Year	Publication	Country	Accolade	Rank
1998	Kerrang!	United Kingdom	20 Great Nirvana Songs Picked by the Stars	20

=== Personnel ===
Credits are adapted from the liner notes of MTV Unplugged in New York.

- Kurt Cobain – vocals, lead guitar
- Pat Smear – rhythm guitar
- Krist Novoselic – bass guitar
- Dave Grohl – drums
- Lori Goldston – cello

=== Charts ===
==== Weekly charts ====
Chart (1995)	Peak position
Belgium (Ultratop 50 Flanders)	40
Belgium (VRT Top 30 Flanders)	24
Canada Top Singles (RPM)	22
Canada Contemporary Hit Radio (The Record)	22
Canada Contemporary Album Radio (The Record)	25
European Hit Radio Top 40 (Music & Media)	29
France Airplay (Music & Media)	5
Iceland (Íslenski Listinn Topp 40)	2
Spain Airplay (Music & Media)	2
US Radio Songs (Billboard)	39
US Alternative Airplay (Billboard)	6
US Mainstream Rock (Billboard)	12
US Alternative Top 50 (Radio & Records)	5
US Rock Tracks Top 60 (Radio & Records)	12

Chart (2012)	Position
UK Rock & Metal (Official Charts)	13

Chart (2013)	Position
France (SNEP)	149

==== Year-end charts ====
Chart (1995)	Position
Iceland (Íslenski Listinn Topp 40)	21
US Top Rock Tracks (Radio & Records)	66

=== Certifications ===
Region	Certification	Certified units/sales
Australia (ARIA)	2× Platinum	140,000^{‡}
Brazil (Pro-Música Brasil)	Gold	30,000^{‡}
Italy (FIMI) Sales since 2009	Gold	50,000^{‡}
New Zealand (RMNZ)	2× Platinum	60,000^{‡}
Spain (Promusicae)	Gold	30,000^{‡}
United Kingdom (BPI) Sales since 2004	Platinum	600,000^{‡}
^{‡} Sales+streaming figures based on certification alone.
