= Earthling Tour =

1997 concert tour by David Bowie

- Tour by David Bowie
- Poster to the concert in Malmö, Sweden. A similar layout was used for other concert posters.
- Location: Europe; North America; South America
- Associated album: Earthling
- Start date: 7 June 1997
- End date: 7 November 1997
- Legs: 3
- No. of shows: 83

David Bowie concert chronology
- The Outside Tour (1995–96); Earthling Tour (1997); Hours Tour (1999)

The Earthling Tour was a 1997 concert tour by English musician David Bowie, in promotion of his album Earthling. The tour started on 7 June 1997 at Flughafen Blankensee in Lübeck, Germany, continuing through Europe and the Americas before concluding in Buenos Aires, Argentina on 7 November 1997.

== Background and history ==
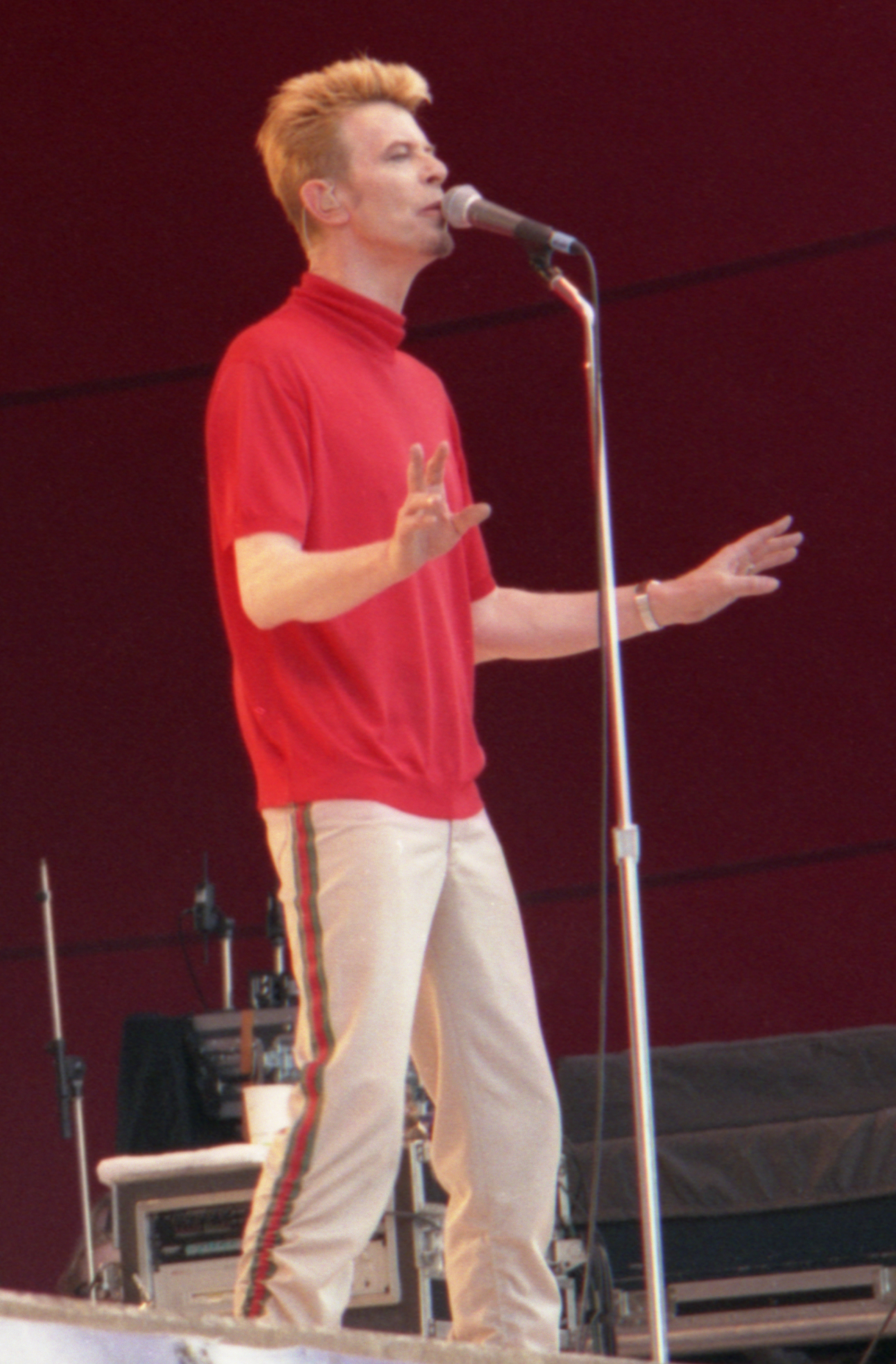
Bowie performing at the Ruisrock festival in Finland

Immediately following his 1995-96 Outside Tour, Bowie went into the studio with his live band to record Earthling (1997) in mid-1996. Bowie first publicly performed new material from these sessions in late 1996, playing "Telling Lies" and sometimes "Little Wonder" at shows on the US East Coast in September and October. On 9 January 1997, the day after he turned 50, Bowie held a 50th birthday concert for himself, performing tracks off the album, as well as a selection of songs from his back catalogue, playing to nearly 15,000 fans at New York's Madison Square Garden. Bowie was joined onstage by artists including Billy Corgan, Foo Fighters, Sonic Youth, Black Francis, Robert Smith and Lou Reed, to perform many of his songs. Other non-performing guests included Beck, Moby, Julian Schnabel, Prince, Charlie Sexton, Fred Schneider, Christopher Walken, Matt Dillon and Bowie's wife Iman. Artist Tony Oursler designed some of the artwork for the video backdrop that played behind the band onstage. The event was recorded for a pay-per-view special commemorating the event, and a portion of the proceeds from the event were donated to the charity Save the Children. Tim Pope, who had previously worked with Bowie directing his 1987 video for "Time Will Crawl", directed the 50th Anniversary video, and Duncan Jones, Bowie's son, was one of the camera operators at the event. A month later on 3 February, Earthling was released and Bowie promoted it with appearances on Saturday Night Live (8 February) and The Tonight Show (11 February). The Pay-Per-View broadcast of the birthday concert followed on 8 March.

Bowie and his band began rehearsing for the tour in April 1997, and expected the tour to last through the end of the year, calling it a "really extensive, a long, long tour" in an interview with the press in February that year. During rehearsals for the tour, Bowie re-recorded updated studio versions of some of his older songs, including "The Man Who Sold the World" and "Stay". These updated versions were performed during the tour, though the latter wouldn't be officially released until 2020 as part of the EP Is It Any Wonder?

The original concept was to perform two sets: one regular and one dance-oriented, incorporating drum and bass. This idea was abandoned, owing to the antipathy of critics and audiences. After the performance at the Muziekcentrum Vredenburg in Utrecht, on 11 June 1997, elements of each were incorporated into one set. "He hated playing things just like the record," recalled guitarist Reeves Gabrels. "He wanted me to dress songs up in the clothes we're wearing now."

The 14 October 1997 show at the Capitol Theatre in Port Chester, New York – broadcast on MTV's Live from the 10 Spot – was added at short notice due to cancellation by The Rolling Stones. The following show on 15 October 1997 at the Radio City Music Hall in New York City, New York was part of the GQ Awards. Bowie and the band also performed at KROQ's "Almost Acoustic Christmas" show in December 1997.

A live album from the European leg of the tour made it to the mixing stage- Bowie, Gabrels and Mark Plati were all involved- but Virgin, the band's label, cancelled the release. The release was eventually made available, albeit with a different track listing than originally envisioned, to BowieNet subscribers as the release LiveAndWell.com, which was re-released in 2021.

For some shows on the tour, Bowie wore outfits designed by Donna Karan.

== Tao Jones Index ==
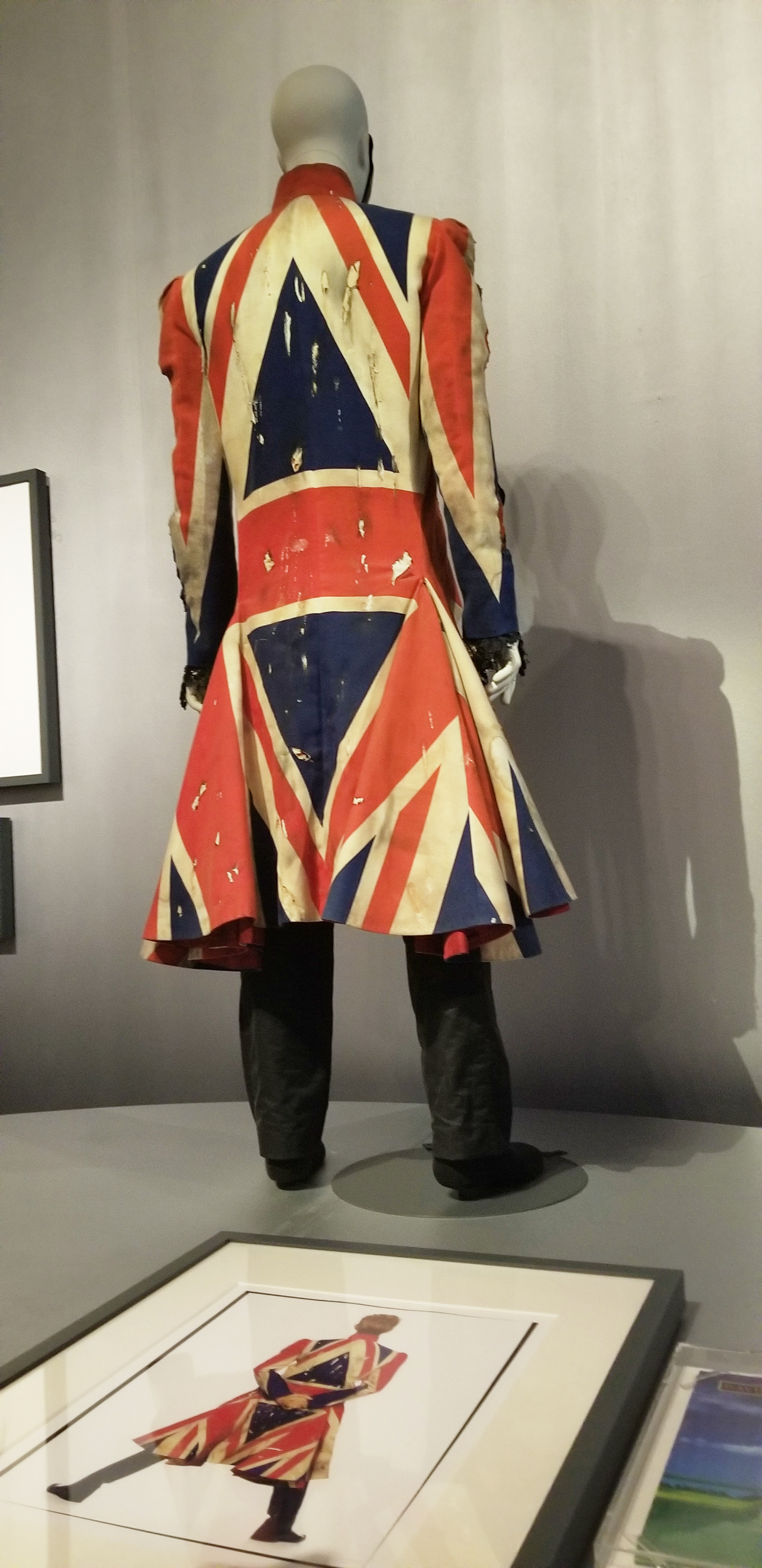
The Union Jack coat, worn by Bowie on the tour, on display at the David Bowie Is exhibition in 2018.

Bowie and the band performed a small number of "secret" shows under the name "Tao Jones Index", deliberately playing without people knowing who they were. "Tao Jones Index" was a pun based on Bowie's real name, David Jones, and the 1997 Bowie Bond issue (Tao is pronounced "Dow", as in Dow Jones Index from the US stock market). According to Gabrels, drummer Zachary Alford likely came up with the name, and they only played as Tao Jones Index "a half dozen [times] or fewer", eventually wearying of the project as fans began to recognize Bowie and call out for him to play his hits. The sets were, according to Gabrels, less strictly drum and bass so much as "dance remixes": "We were inspired by the various remixes of Earthling songs to reclaim & remake them as a live band." The band played their normal instruments, but without amplifiers, and Alford played electronic drums. There was only one official release from any of the Tao Jones Index's performances: a 12" single of "Pallas Athena" and "V-2 Schneider" (1997).

One live performance was 10 June 1997, from which the live versions of "Pallas Athena" and "V2-Schneider" were recorded; another live performance was on 19 July 1997 Phoenix Festival; their performance in the BBC Radio 1 dance tent preceded the regular performance on the main stage the following day.

== Reception ==
The San Francisco Examiner had praise for the tour, saying "The chameleon can rock". The Los Angeles Times complimented his artistic reinvigoration.

== Look at the Moon! (Live Phoenix Festival 97) ==
Look at the Moon! (Live Phoenix Festival 97)

Live album by David Bowie
- Released: 12 February 2021
- Recorded: 20 July 1997
- Venues: Long Marston, England
- Label: Parlophone

David Bowie chronology
LiveAndWell.com (2021)	Look at the Moon! (Live Phoenix Festival 97) (2021)	Something in the Air (Live Paris 99) (2021)

The band's performance on 20 July 1997, recorded at Long Marston, England during the Phoenix Festival, was released in a live album entitled Look at the Moon! in February 2021. The concert was released in two limited editions: a 2 CD-set or a 3-LP set. This live album was the fourth in the 6-concert series Brilliant Live Adventures. Look at the Moon! reached number 16 on the UK albums chart, and number 92 in Ireland.

=== Look at the Moon setlist ===
1. "Quicksand"
2. "The Man Who Sold the World"
3. "Driftin' Blues"/"The Jean Genie"
4. "I'm Afraid of Americans"
5. "Battle for Britain (The Letter)"
6. "Fashion"
7. "Seven Years in Tibet"
8. "Fame"
9. "Looking for Satellites"
10. "Under Pressure"
11. "The Hearts Filthy Lesson"
12. "Scary Monsters (And Super Creeps)"
13. "Hallo Spaceboy"
14. "Little Wonder"
15. "Dead Man Walking"
16. "White Light/White Heat"
17. "O Superman"
18. "Stay"

== Tour band ==
- David Bowie – vocals, guitar, alto & baritone saxophone
- Reeves Gabrels – guitar, backing vocals
- Gail Ann Dorsey – bass guitar, vocals, keyboards
- Zack Alford – drums, percussion
- Mike Garson – keyboards, backing vocals

== Tour dates ==
Date	City	Country	Venue
Warm-up shows
17 May 1997	Dublin	Ireland	The Factory Studios
2 June 1997	London	England	Hanover Grand
3 June 1997	London	England	Hanover Grand
5 June 1997	Hamburg	Germany	Große Freiheit
Europe
7 June 1997	Lübeck	Germany	Flughafen Blankensee
8 June 1997	Offenbach am Main	Germany	Bieberer Berg Stadion
10 June 1997 (Note: Performed as Tao Jones Index and tracks released on LiveAndWell.com)	Amsterdam	Netherlands	Paradiso
11 June 1997	Utrecht	Netherlands	Muziekcentrum Vredenburg
13 June 1997	Essen	Germany	(Cancelled) Georg-Melches-Stadion
13 June 1997	Dortmund	Germany	Westfalenhalle
14 June 1997	Paris	France	Parc des Princes
16 June 1997	Rezé	France	La Trocardiére
17 June 1997	Bordeaux	France	La Médoquine
19 June 1997 (Note: Tracks released on LiveAndWell.com)	Clermont-Ferrand	France	Maison des Sports
21 June 1997	Leipzig	Germany	Agra Hall - Go Bang Festival
22 June 1997	Munich	Germany	Flugplatz Neubiberg - Go Bang Festival
24 June 1997	Vienna	Austria	Sommer Arena
25 June 1997	Prague	Czech Republic	Prague Congress Centre
28 June 1997	Oslo	Norway	Kalvøyafestivalen
29 June 1997	Turku	Finland	Ruisrock Festival
1 July 1997	Zagreb	Croatia	Dom Sportova
2 July 1997	Pistoia	Italy	Piazza del Duomo
4 July 1997	Torhout	Belgium	Torhout/Werchter Festival
5 July 1997	Werchter	Belgium	Torhout/Werchter Festival
6 July 1997	Ringe	Denmark	Midtfyns Festival
8 July 1997	Brescia	Italy	Stadio Mario Rigamonti
10 July 1997	Naples	Italy	Neapolis Festival
11 July 1997	Arbatax	Italy	Rocce Rosse Festival
13 July 1997	Frauenfeld	Switzerland	Out In The Green
15 July 1997	Madrid	Spain	(Cancelled) Las Ventas
15 July 1997	Madrid	Spain	Sala Aqualung
16 July 1997	Zaragoza	Spain	Pabellón Príncipe Felipe
17 July 1997	San Sebastián	Spain	Velódromo de Anoeta
19 July 1997 (Note: Performed as Tao Jones Index)	Stratford upon Avon	England	Phoenix Festival; Long Marston Airfield
20 July 1997 (Note: Performance recorded and released on Look at the Moon!)	Stratford upon Avon	England	Phoenix Festival; Long Marston Airfield
22 July 1997	Glasgow	Scotland	Barrowland Ballroom
23 July 1997	Manchester	England	Manchester Academy
25 July 1997	Malmö	Sweden	Mölleplatsen
26 July 1997	Stockholm	Sweden	Lollipop Festival
27 July 1997	Gdańsk	Poland	(Cancelled) Stadion Lechii
29 July 1997	Lyon	France	Ancient Theatre of Fourvière
30 July 1997	Juan-les-Pins	France	Pinède Gould
1 August 1997	Birmingham	England	Que Club
2 August 1997	Liverpool	England	Royal Court
3 August 1997	Newcastle upon Tyne	England	Riverside
5 August 1997	Nottingham	England	Rock City
6 August 1997	Leeds	England	Town & Country Club
8 August 1997	Dublin	Ireland	Olympia Theatre
9 August 1997	Dublin	Ireland	Olympia Theatre
11 August 1997	London	England	Shepherd's Bush Empire
12 August 1997	London	England	Shepherd's Bush Empire
14 August 1997	Budapest	Hungary	Sziget Festival
North America
6 September 1997	Vancouver	Canada	Plaza of Nations
7 September 1997	Seattle	United States	Paramount Theater
9 September 1997	San Francisco	United States	The Warfield
10 September 1997	Los Angeles	United States	Hollywood Athletic Club
12 September 1997	Los Angeles	United States	Universal Amphitheatre
13 September 1997	Los Angeles	United States	Universal Amphitheatre
15 September 1997	San Francisco	United States	The Warfield
16 September 1997	San Francisco	United States	The Warfield
19 September 1997	Chicago	United States	The Vic Theater
21 September 1997	Detroit	United States	State Theatre
22 September 1997	Detroit	United States	State Theatre
24 September 1997	Montreal	Canada	Metropolis
25 September 1997	Montreal	Canada	Metropolis
27 September 1997	Toronto	Canada	Warehouse
28 September 1997	Toronto	Canada	Warehouse
30 September 1997	Boston	United States	Orpheum Theatre
1 October 1997	Boston	United States	Orpheum Theatre
3 October 1997	Philadelphia	United States	Electric Factory
4 October 1997	Philadelphia	United States	Electric Factory
7 October 1997	Fort Lauderdale	United States	Chili Pepper
8 October 1997	Fort Lauderdale	United States	Chili Pepper
10 October 1997	Atlanta	United States	International Ballroom
12 October 1997	Washington, D.C.	United States	The Capitol Ballroom
13 October 1997	New York City	United States	The Supper Club
14 October 1997 (Note: Performance on MTV's Live at the 10 Spot)	Port Chester	United States	Capitol Theatre
15 October 1997 (Note: Performance at the GQ Awards; tracks released on LiveAndWell.com)	New York City	United States	Radio City Music Hall
17 October 1997	Chicago	United States	Aragon Ballroom
18 October 1997	Saint Paul	United States	Roy Wilkins Auditorium
23 October 1997	Mexico City	Mexico	Foro Sol
South America
31 October 1997	Curitiba	Brazil	Pedreira Paulo Leminski
1 November 1997	São Paulo	Brazil	Ibirapuera Arena
2 November 1997 (Note: Tracks released on LiveAndWell.com)	Rio de Janeiro	Brazil	Citibank Hall
5 November 1997	Santiago	Chile	Estadio Nacional de Chile
7 November 1997	Buenos Aires	Argentina	Estadio Arquitecto Ricardo Etcheverri

== Songs ==
From Space Oddity

- "Space Oddity"

From The Man Who Sold the World

- "The Man Who Sold the World"
- "The Supermen"

From Hunky Dory

- "Quicksand"
- "Andy Warhol" (Acoustic)
- "Queen Bitch"

From The Rise and Fall of Ziggy Stardust and the Spiders from Mars

- "Moonage Daydream"
- "Lady Stardust" (Acoustic)

From Aladdin Sane

- "Aladdin Sane (1913-1938-197?)" (Acoustic)
- "Panic in Detroit"
- "The Jean Genie"

From Live Santa Monica '72

- "My Death" (originally from La Valse à mille temps (1959) by Jacques Brel; written by Brel & Mort Shuman)
- "I'm Waiting for the Man" (originally from The Velvet Underground & Nico (1967) by The Velvet Underground and Nico, written by Lou Reed; outtake from various Bowie sessions 1966-72)

From Ziggy Stardust: The Motion Picture

- "White Light/White Heat" (originally from White Light/White Heat (1968) by The Velvet Underground; written by Lou Reed)

From Young Americans

- "Fame" (Bowie, John Lennon, Carlos Alomar)

From Station to Station

- "Stay"

From Low

- "Always Crashing in the Same Car"

From "Heroes"

- "'Heroes'" (Bowie, Brian Eno)
- "V-2 Schneider"

From Lodger

- "Look Back in Anger" (Bowie, Eno)
- "Repetition" (Acoustic)

From Scary Monsters (and Super Creeps)

- "Scary Monsters (and Super Creeps)"
- "Fashion"

From Let's Dance

- "China Girl" (Acoustic)

From Tin Machine

- "Heaven's in Here" (Only performed in snippet solo throughout "The Jean Genie")
- "I Can't Read" (Bowie, Reeves Gabrels)

From Tin Machine II

- "Shopping for Girls" (Acoustic)

From Black Tie White Noise

- "Pallas Athena" (Tao Jones Index version)

From Outside

- "Outside" (Bowie, Kevin Armstrong)
- "The Hearts Filthy Lesson" (Bowie, Eno, Gabrels, Mike Garson, Erdal Kızılçay, Sterling Campbell)
- "Hallo Spaceboy" (Bowie, Eno)
- "The Motel" (Bowie, Eno)
- "The Voyeur of Utter Destruction (as Beauty)" (Bowie, Eno, Gabrels)
- "I'm Deranged" [Jungle Mix] (Bowie, Eno)
- "Strangers When We Meet"

From Earthling

- "Little Wonder" (Bowie, Gabrels, Mark Plati)
- "Looking for Satellites" (Bowie, Gabrels, Plati)
- "Battle for Britain (The Letter)" (Bowie, Gabrels, Plati)
- "Seven Years in Tibet" (Bowie, Gabrels)
- "Dead Man Walking" (Bowie, Gabrels)
- "Dead Man Walking Moby Mix 1]" (Bowie, Gabrels)
- "Telling Lies"
- "The Last Thing You Should Do" (Bowie, Gabrels, Plati)
- "I'm Afraid of Americans" (Bowie, Eno)
- "I'm Afraid of Americans" [Nine Inch Nails V1 Mix] (Bowie, Eno, Reznor)

Other songs:

- "Can't Help Thinking About Me" (early non-album single (1966))
- "All the Young Dudes" (from All the Young Dudes (1972) by Mott the Hoople; written by Bowie)
- "Under Pressure" (originally a single (1981) by Bowie and Queen later found on Hot Space the following year; written by Bowie, John Deacon, Brian May, Freddie Mercury, Roger Taylor)
- "Is It Any Wonder?" (Instrumental jam based on "Fame", reworked as "Fun" for a BowieNet release)
- "O Superman (For Massenet)" (from Big Science (1982) by Laurie Anderson; written by Anderson)

Songs performed in snippet for the intro of "The Jean Genie":

- "Driftin' Blues"
- "Baby What You Want to Do"
- "Good Morning, Little Schoolgirl"
