= Joe the Lion =

Song by David Bowie

from the album "Heroes"
- Released: 14 October 1977
- Recorded: July–August 1977
- Studio: Hansa Studio by the Wall, West Berlin
- Genre: Art rock, krautrock
- Length: 3:05
- Label: RCA
- Songwriter(s): David Bowie
- Producer(s): David Bowie, Tony Visconti

"Joe the Lion" is a song by David Bowie in 1977 for the album "Heroes". It was produced by Bowie and Tony Visconti and features lead guitar by Robert Fripp.

"Joe the Lion" has been described by critic Chris O'Leary as "phenomenal" and "one of the high peaks of Bowie's late Seventies". Mojo magazine listed it as Bowie's 94th best track in 2015.

== Background ==
The track is in part a tribute to performance artist Chris Burden, who was famous for having himself crucified to a Volkswagen in 1974 ("Nail me to my car and I'll tell you who you are") and for having an assistant shoot him in the arm at an art gallery in 1971 ("Guess you'll buy a gun / You'll buy it secondhand"). "Joe the Lion" has also been seen as reflecting Bowie's struggle to overcome the emotional numbness that appeared to permeate his previous album Low ("You get up and sleep").

Bowie rehearsed the song for the Isolar II tour of 1978, but it ultimately was not performed live until the first two dates on the 1983 Serious Moonlight Tour and more frequently on the 1995 Outside Tour.

== Personnel ==
According to Chris O'Leary:

- David Bowie – lead and backing vocals, piano
- Robert Fripp – lead guitar
- Carlos Alomar – rhythm guitar
- Brian Eno – EMS VCS 3 synthesizer, guitar treatments
- George Murray – bass guitar
- Dennis Davis – drums
- Tony Visconti – backing vocals, guitar treatments

Technical

- David Bowie – producer
- Tony Visconti – producer, engineer
- Colin Thurston – engineer

== Other releases ==
- The song was released as the B-side of the US release of "John, I’m Only Dancing (Again)" in December 1979.
- It appeared on the following compilations:
  - Golden Years (1983)
  - Sound + Vision box set (1989)
- A remixed version, which replaced the distorted guitars and drums of the original with those reflecting late-1980s production values, was included in the Rykodisc reissue of "Heroes" in 1991.
- A previously unreleased live soundcheck rehearsal of the song from the Isolar II Tour was released in February 2020, backing a picture disc, featuring a live recording of “Alabama Song“.
- Momus performed a cover version of "Joe the Lion" for his 2015 album Turpsycore.

== Live versions ==
- A live version recorded in 1995 during Bowie's Outside Tour was released as part of the live album Ouvre le Chien (Live Dallas 95) (2020).
