= The Hearts Filthy Lesson =

1995 single by David Bowie

Single by David Bowie

from the album Outside
- B-side: "I Am with Name"
- Released: 11 September 1995
- Recorded: March 1994
- Studio: Mountain (Montreux)
- Genre: Industrial rock; electronic rock; art rock
- Length: 4:57 (album version); 3:32 (radio edit)
- Label: Arista; BMG; RCA
- Songwriters: David Bowie; Brian Eno; Reeves Gabrels; Erdal Kızılçay; Sterling Campbell; Mike Garson
- Producers: David Bowie; Brian Eno; David Richards

David Bowie singles chronology
"The Buddha of Suburbia" (1993)	"The Hearts Filthy Lesson" (1995)	"Strangers When We Meet" (1995)

"The Hearts Filthy Lesson" (no apostrophe in "Hearts" [sic]) is a song by English musician David Bowie from his 20th studio album, Outside (1995), and issued as a single ahead of the album. Released in September 1995 by Arista, BMG and RCA, it showcased Bowie's new, industrial-influenced sound. Lyrically, the single connects with the rest of the album, with Bowie offering a lament to "tyrannical futurist" Ramona A. Stone, a theme continued in subsequent songs. The song is also meant to confront Bowie's own perceptions about the ritual creation and degradation of art. Its music video was directed by Samuel Bayer and was so controversial that it required a re-edit for MTV. The song appears in the end credits of the 1995 film Seven.

== Song development ==
The song came out of the March 1994 Leon sessions in which Bowie and his band had performed long, improvised musical numbers, from which much of the album Outside was born. Due to the song coming out of band experimentation, the song is credited with six authors: Bowie, Brian Eno, Reeves Gabrels, Erdal Kızılçay, Sterling Campbell and Mike Garson. Bowie would say that the song "doesn't have a straightforward coherent message to it. ... It's just information: make of it what you will", and that it is a "montage of subject matter, bits from newspapers, storylines, dreams and half-formed thoughts". In the promotional press kit that came out with the album, Bowie, who was in his late forties, said that the "filthy lesson" is the "certainty of one's death", a lesson that most people don't understand until they're older. At one point during the song's development, Bowie went back and recorded new lyrics based on English landscape painters. Reeves Gabrels, who worked with Bowie on the album, told him, "that's nice and all – but it's kind of destroyed the essence of the song, don't you think?", after which Bowie restored the original lyrics.

== Reception and chart performance ==
Critical reception to the song was generally tepid, though it would be re-evaluated by many critics when heard in the context of the album soon afterwards. In spite of its defiantly noncommercial sound the song reached No. 35 in the UK and No. 41 in Canada. Writing for Dotmusic, James Masterton said the song "wanders around apparently aimlessly for four minutes in a most unmemorable fashion." David Hemingway from Melody Maker wrote, "'The Hearts Filthy Lesson' is a little too (intentionally?) shapeless and as a result, a little too boring." Pan-European magazine Music & Media commented, "Put Bowie & Eno in one room, and the same kind of magic occurs as when Jagger & Richards reunite. His last albums were "nice", but with this industrial track the thin white duke returns to the front."

A reviewer from Music Week rated it three out of five, adding, "Slowpaced yet oddly stirring, an androgynous avan-ballad which provides proof positive of Bowie's regeneration." Angela Lewis from NME wrote, "A dude who, 28 decades down the line, still never ceases to amaze. Really, who would have guessed that in 1995, Bowie with help from Brian Eno, would find stimulation in parodying late '80s Duran Duran B-sides? Cyber-rock pretensions and fractured electro soundscapes give the impression Bowie makes music as if arranging expensive art decor." Biographer Nicholas Pegg said that to those uninitiated to Bowie's music, this song came off as "a tuneless din", but to those who know Bowie it was "a stunning slab of industrial techno-rock."

The single was Bowie's first to enter the top 100 in the US charts since "Never Let Me Down" in 1987 by briefly peaking there at No. 92. In Sweden, "The Hearts Filthy Lesson" peaked at No. 34 in 1995.

== Music video ==
The video featured a montage of art-style mutilations and gory objets d'art and was subsequently edited when shown on MTV. The clip was directed by Samuel Bayer. The video, which was controversial enough to require a re-edit for MTV, contained "shots of skulls, gibbets, candles and gruesome objects in pickling jars, while all the time a skeletal string-puppet drummer thrashes out the rhythm." Pegg described the results as "brilliant, frightening, and unlikely to woo the mass market." In interviews, Bowie commented on the "ritual art" aspects of Outside: "My input revolved around the idea of ritual art—what options were there open to that kind of quasi-sacrificial blood-obsessed sort of art form? And the idea of a neo-paganism developing—especially in America—with the advent of the new cults of tattooing and scarification and piercings and all that. I think people have a real need for some spiritual life and I think there's great spiritual starving going on. There's a hole that's been vacated by an authoritative religious body—the Judaeo-Christian ethic doesn't seem to embrace all the things that people actually need to have dealt with in that way—and it's sort of been left to popular culture to soak up the leftover bits like violence and sex.

== Live versions ==
Bowie first performed the song on the Late Show with David Letterman on 25 September 1995, the day before the album was released in the US. He performed the song during his 50th birthday celebration concert in New York City on 9 January 1997, and this performance was included on the "Earthling in the City" CD. A version recorded in July 1996 at the Phoenix Festival in Stratford-upon-Avon, Warwickshire, England was released on the live album LiveAndWell.com in 2000. It was regularly performed during Bowie's 1995–1996 Outside Tour; a version performed in 1995 during this tour was released in 2020 on Ouvre le Chien (Live Dallas 95). It was performed occasionally during Bowie's 1997 Earthling Tour, and the song was included in the track listing for his live album Look at the Moon! (Live Phoenix Festival 97) (2021). The last time the song was played live was on the last show of the Earthling Tour, on 7 November 1997, in Buenos Aires.

== Other releases ==
The radio edit was included on the compilation albums Best of Bowie (2-CD US/Canada 2002) and Nothing Has Changed (3-CD 2014). Several of the remixes were released on the 2004 limited 2CD edition of Outside. The song plays over the closing credits of the 1995 movie Seven, although it was not released as part of the official soundtrack.

== Track listings ==
All songs are credited to Bowie/Eno/Gabrels/Kızılçay/Campbell Eecept "Nothing to be Desired", credited to Bowie/Eno.

- UK CD version
1. "The Hearts Filthy Lesson" (radio edit) – 3:32
2. "I Am with Name" – 4:06
3. "The Hearts Filthy Lesson" (Bowie mix) – 4:56
4. "The Hearts Filthy Lesson" (Trent Reznor Alternative mix) – 5:19
- UK 12-inch and picture disc version
1. "The Hearts Filthy Lesson" (Trent Reznor Alternative mix) – 5:19
2. "The Hearts Filthy Lesson" (Bowie mix) – 4:56
3. "The Hearts Filthy Lesson" (Rubber mix) – 7:41
4. "The Hearts Filthy Lesson" (Simple Text mix) – 6:38
5. "The Hearts Filthy Lesson" (Filthy mix) – 5:51
- European shaped CD version
1. "The Hearts Filthy Lesson" (Trent Reznor Alternative mix) – 5:19
2. "The Hearts Filthy Lesson" (Bowie mix) – 4:56
- US CD version
1. "The Hearts Filthy Lesson" (album version) – 4:57
2. "The Hearts Filthy Lesson" (Simenon mix) – 5:01
3. "The Hearts Filthy Lesson" (Trent Reznor Alternative mix) – 5:19
4. "Nothing to Be Desired" – 2:15

== Personnel ==
According to Chris O'Leary:

- David Bowie – lead and backing vocal, keyboards
- Brian Eno – synthesizers
- Reeves Gabrels – lead guitar
- Erdal Kızılçay – bass
- Mike Garson – piano, keyboards
- Sterling Campbell – drums, percussion
- Bryony, Lola, Josey and Ruby Edwards – backing vocals

Technical

- David Bowie – producer
- Brian Eno – producer
- David Richards – engineer

== Charts ==
Chart (1995)	Peak position
Scottish Singles Sales (Official Charts)	41
Sweden (Sverigetopplistan)	34
UK Singles (Official Charts)	35
US Alternative Airplay (Billboard)	20
US Billboard Hot 100	92
