= Outside Tour =

1995–96 concert tour by David Bowie

The Outside Tour
- Tour by David Bowie
- Poster to the concert in Dortmund, Germany
- Location: North America; Europe
- Associated album: 1. Outside
- Start date: 14 September 1995
- End date: 14 October 1996
- Legs: 3
- No. of shows: 99

David Bowie concert chronology
- Sound+Vision Tour (1990); The Outside Tour (1995–96); Earthling Tour (1997)
Nine Inch Nails concert chronology
Self Destruct Tour (1994–95)	Dissonance Tour (1995)	Fragility Tour (1999–2000)

The Outside Tour was a tour by the English rock musician David Bowie, opening in September 1995 and lasting over a year. The opening shows preceded the release of the 1. Outside album which it supported. The tour visited stops in North America and Europe.

The US leg of the tour was supported by Nine Inch Nails as part of their extended Self Destruct Tour, who segued their set with Bowie's to form a continuous show. Morrissey was the support act for the entire European leg, but withdrew from the tour after nine date, leading to bands such as 'Out Of My Hair' filling the support slots. On some US dates, Prick opened before Nine Inch Nails, and on some occasions, Reeves Gabrels performed songs from his album The Sacred Squall of Now in addition to performing with Nine Inch Nails and David Bowie.

An official live recording from the tour, Ouvrez le Chien (Live Dallas 95) was released in July 2020, and another, No Trendy Réchauffé (Live Birmingham 95), was released in December 2020.

In a 2012 Rolling Stone reader's poll, the tour (pairing Nine Inch Nails with Bowie) was named one of the top 10 opening acts in rock history.

== Background ==
Bowie released his album Outside in late September 1995, having recorded it from early 1994 through early 1995, for which this tour was named. It was Bowie's first solo tour since he retired his hits during the 1990 Sound+Vision Tour, and his first performances on stage since The Freddie Mercury Tribute Concert in 1992. Initial tour rehearsals were held at the Complete Music Studios in New York before moving to the Mullins Center, where Nine Inch Nails joined the rehearsal.

Of the material for this tour, Bowie said, "We're going to play some older material, sure, but not obvious things. I found, while rehearsing for the [Outside] tour, that older songs I haven't played for years suddenly fit in with this new material quite well – things like ... "Joe the Lion." So I'm quite looking forward to it." Other songs from Bowie's back catalog that he performed during the tour include "Scary Monsters (and Super Creeps)", "Look Back in Anger", "Andy Warhol" and "Breaking Glass".

Bowie said of why he chose to tour with Nine Inch Nails, "I personally did like the combination of NIN and me, but my fans didn't. Bad luck!! It also was an extremely young audience, between about 12 and 17 years old. My starting point was simply: I've just made an adventurous album, what can I do now to turn the concerts as adventurous. Looking at it in that way, it seemed logical to confront myself with the NIN audience. I knew it would be hard to captivate them by music they never heard, by an artist whose name was the only familiar thing."

Trent Reznor has gone on record numerous times as being heavily influenced by David Bowie, and further collaborated with Bowie by remixing "The Hearts Filthy Lesson" and later on 1997's "I'm Afraid of Americans" single. When asked in 1995 if his album Outside was influenced by Nine Inch Nails, Bowie answered, "the band that I was actually quite taken with was three guys from Switzerland call The Young Gods ... I’d been aware of them previous to knowing about Nine Inch Nails."

== Set and costume design ==
For the tour, Bowie went with a modest stage design ("some banners, some mannequins") and avoided the theatrical presentation like his previous Glass Spider Tour in 1987 and Sound+Vision Tour in 1990. The stage "resembled a building site, with paint splashed crumpled sheets draped about", and included an old fashioned table and chair in one corner, onto which Bowie would occasionally climb during shows. Above the stage, a neon sign displayed the phrase "Ouvrez le Chien", a partial lyric from Bowie's 1970 song "All the Madmen", which he repeated in his 1993 song "The Buddha of Suburbia". During the US portion of the tour, an additional neon sign hung above the stage displayed phrases like "Strange Ko", "Noise Angel", "Man Made" or "Street Volva" that changed nightly.

Bowie had a few outfits for the tour which varied between the European and US shows, and included three jackets designed by Alexander McQueen.

== Performance notes ==
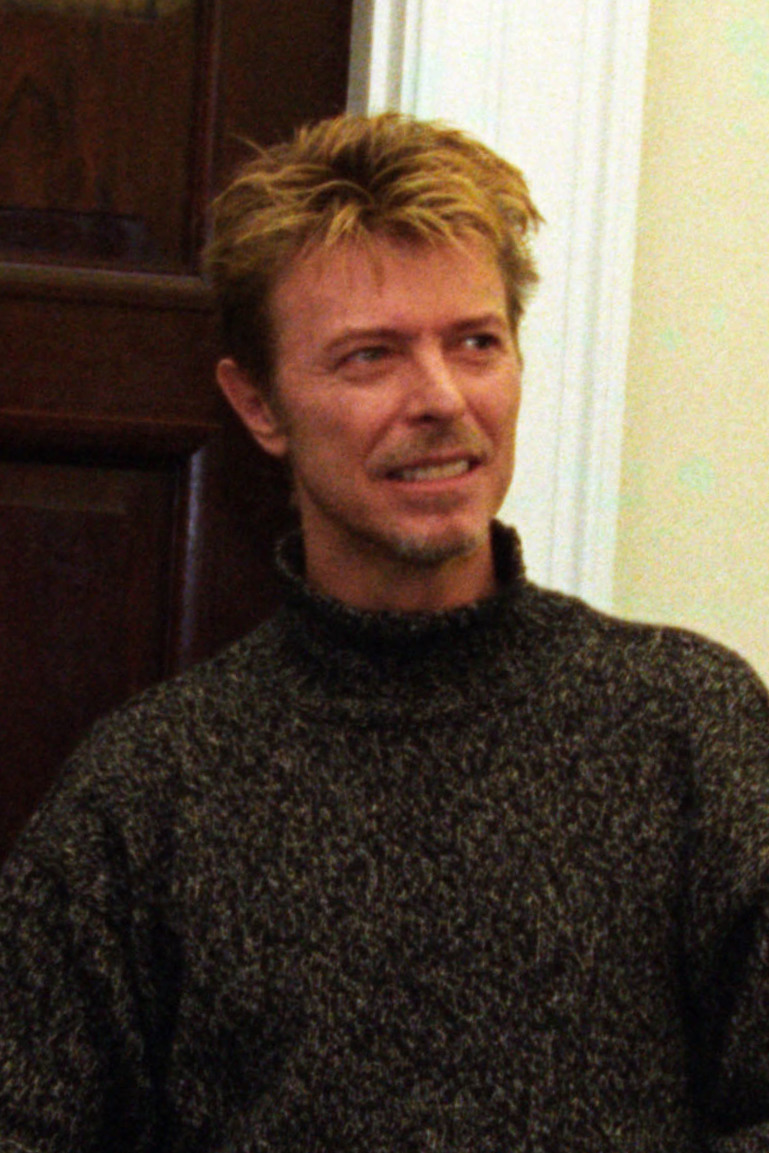
Bowie in 1995

Bowie opened an interview for the tour with USA Today on the opening day of the tour, on 14 September 1995 with the question "How do you commit commercial suicide? Well, you do this: play songs from an album that hasn't been released yet, and complement it with obscure songs from the past that you've never done on stage."

American industrial rock band Prick opened some nights on the US leg, and for some shows, Gabrels would perform songs from his then-new album The Sacred Squall of Now. During the tour, as Nine Inch Nails reached the conclusion of their performance, the two bands played together with both Nine Inch Nails and Bowie and his band performing "Subterraneans", "Hallo Spaceboy" and "Scary Monsters (and Super Creeps)", followed by two Nine Inch Nails songs "Reptile" and "Hurt" after which Bowie continued with his own set alone. A review of the opening night of the tour said that "Moving from NIN to Bowie was like moving from Kansas to Oz. Instead of the stark white stage light beating down like investigation lamps, the stage became awash in color and texture." The same review acknowledged that the shift in music puzzled some in the audience, but overall called the show "an impressive body of new music, splendidly delivered". A review of the following night in Mansfield, Massachusetts was unkind, saying that by the end of the set, "Bowie proved he was not up to sharing the stage with NIN, yet insisted on dragging out his overlong performance to its embarrassingly self-indulgent end."

Early in the tour, the "almost 100% Nails audience" provided a challenge to Bowie, who said "In those first weeks, we had to adjust emotionally to the fact that we were going to be challenged every night to get in sync with what people were coming to the show for. But then you start to recognize that if you're going to continue, you'd better enjoy what you're doing. The more we did that, the more it communicated to the audience. That's how it went from survival to being a good tour."

Bowie signed copies of his album at a local record store while in New York on 26 September 1995.

Morrissey was slated to be the opening act of the European tour, but he suddenly and unexpectedly quit just before the Aberdeen Exhibition Centre performance on 29 November 1995. The support slot was filled on later dates by The Gyres, Echobelly, Placebo, Electrafixion (with Ian McCulloch) and a variety of local bands.

After the 20 February 1996 show in Paris, the band took a break until June, but when the shows resumed the band did not include George Simms, Pete Schwartz or Carlos Alomar, who left the tour with Bowie's blessing to care for his wife, Robin Clark, who had taken ill. Shows from this "Summer Festivals" leg often included yet-to-be-released tracks from Bowie's upcoming Earthling album.

The Kremlin Palace Concert Hall performance on 18 June 1996 was recorded and a 50-minute broadcast was later shown on Russian Television. Other television coverage included the entire 22 June Loreley Festival performance on German TV (Rockpalast) and excerpts from the Phoenix Festival performance on 18 July broadcast on British TV with BBC Radio broadcasting a six-song selection from the performance. One song from this performance, "The Hearts Filthy Lesson", was released on the live CD LiveAndWell.com (1999/2021). The Tel Aviv and Balingen dates were both broadcast on FM radio in their respective countries.

== Live recordings ==
=== Dallas, Texas (Ouvrez le Chien (Live Dallas 95)) ===
Ouvrez le Chien (Live Dallas 95)

Live album by David Bowie
- Released: 3 July 2020
- Recorded: 13 October 1995
- Venues: Starplex Amphitheater, Dallas Texas USA
- Label: Parlophone

David Bowie chronology
I'm Only Dancing (The Soul Tour 74) (2020)	Ouvrez le Chien (Live Dallas 95) (2020)	No Trendy Réchauffé (Live Birmingham 95) (2020)

The 13 October 1995 show, recorded at the Starplex Amphitheater in Dallas Texas, was released on music streaming platforms as David Bowie Ouvrez le Chien (Live Dallas 95) in July 2020 and on CD and vinyl on 30 October 2020. The streaming release includes two live songs recorded at the Birmingham performance as well. Ouvrez le Chien charted at #32 on the UK albums chart and #87 in Ireland. "Ouvrez le Chien" is a partial lyric from Bowie's 1970 song "All the Madmen", which he repeated in his 1993 song "The Buddha of Suburbia". This release is part of the 6-album set Brilliant Live Adventures.

==== Set list ====
1. "Look Back in Anger"
2. "The Hearts Filthy Lesson"
3. "The Voyeur of Utter Destruction (As Beauty)"
4. "I Have Not Been to Oxford Town"
5. "Outside"
6. "Andy Warhol"
7. "Breaking Glass"
8. "The Man Who Sold the World"
9. "We Prick You"
10. "I’m Deranged"
11. "Joe the Lion"
12. "Nite Flights" (Scott Walker)
13. "Under Pressure"
14. "Teenage Wildlife"
15. "Moonage Daydream" (recorded at Birmingham, England) (streaming only)
16. "Under Pressure" (recorded at Birmingham, England) (streaming only)

=== Birmingham, England (No Trendy Réchauffé (Live Birmingham 95)) ===
No Trendy Réchauffé (Live Birmingham 95)

Live album by David Bowie
- Released: 20 November 2020
- Recorded: 13 December 1995
- Venues: National Exhibition Centre, Birmingham England
- Label: Parlophone

David Bowie chronology
Ouvre le Chien (Live Dallas 95) (2020)	No Trendy Réchauffé (Live Birmingham 95) (2020)	LiveAndWell.com (2021)

The 13 December 1995 performance at the National Exhibition Centre (Hall 5) in Birmingham, England, billed as the Big Twix Mix Show with Alanis Morissette, Lightning Seeds and Echobelly as support acts, was filmed by BBC TV with excerpts broadcast at a later date. Two songs from this show, "Under Pressure" and "Moonage Daydream", were released as b-sides on Bowie's "Hallo Spaceboy" (1996) single as well as part of the Ouvrez le Chien release. In late 2020, it was announced that Bowie's show, in its entirety, would be released as No Trendy Réchauffé (Live Birmingham 95) on 20 November 2020. The show contains two performances of "Hallo Spaceboy"; one was intended as the video for the song's official single, but that plan was cancelled after the Pet Shop Boys remixed the single instead. Bowie biographer Nicholas Pegg called the release "bloody marvellous. Tight, urgent, muscular renditions of Scary Monsters, Hallo Spaceboy, The Voyeur, Oxford Town. Possibly the best band he ever had." "No trendy réchauffé" is a partial lyric from the song "Strangers When We Meet", which is included in the setlist for this show. The release is part of the 6-album set Brilliant Live Adventures.

No Trendy Réchauffé hit number 43 on the Scottish album charts.

==== Set list ====
1. "Look Back in Anger"
2. "Scary Monsters (And Super Creeps)"
3. "The Voyeur of Utter Destruction (as Beauty)"
4. "The Man Who Sold the World"
5. "Hallo Spaceboy"
6. "I Have Not Been to Oxford Town"
7. "Strangers When We Meet"
8. "Breaking Glass"
9. "The Motel"
10. "Jump They Say"
11. "Teenage Wildlife"
12. "Under Pressure"

Encore:

1. "Moonage Daydream"
2. "We Prick You"
3. "Hallo Spaceboy" (version 2)

== Personnel ==
- David Bowie – vocals
- Reeves Gabrels – guitar
- Carlos Alomar – guitar, backing vocals
- Gail Ann Dorsey – bass guitar, vocals
- Zack Alford – drums
- Mike Garson – piano
- Peter Schwartz – synthesizer, musical director
- George Simms – backing vocals, keyboards
- Michael Prowda - monitors
- Steve Guest - FOH

== Tour dates ==
Date	City	Country	Venue	Attendance
North America
14 September 1995	Hartford	United States	Meadows Music Theatre	30,000/30,000
16 September 1995	Mansfield	United States	Great Woods Arts Center	19,000/19,000
17 September 1995	Hershey	United States	Hersheypark Stadium	30,000/30,000
20 September 1995	Toronto	Canada	SkyDome	46,000/46,000
22 September 1995	Camden	United States	Blockbuster Center	25,000/25,000
23 September 1995	Burgettstown	United States	Star Lake Amphitheater	23,000/23,000
27 September 1995	East Rutherford	United States	Meadowlands Arena	40,000/40,000
28 September 1995	East Rutherford	United States	Meadowlands Arena	40,000/40,000
30 September 1995	Cuyahoga Falls	United States	Blossom Music Center	23,000/23,000
1 October 1995	Tinley Park	United States	New World Music Theatre	28,000/28,739
3 October 1995	Auburn Hills	United States	The Palace of Auburn Hills	20,000/22,000
4 October 1995	Columbus	United States	Polaris Amphitheater	20,000/20,000
6 October 1995	Bristow	United States	Nissan Pavilion	25,000/25,000
7 October 1995	Raleigh	United States	Walnut Creek Amphitheatre	20,000/20,000
9 October 1995	Atlanta	United States	Lakewood Amphitheatre	18,000/18,900
11 October 1995	Maryland Heights	United States	Riverport Amphitheatre	20,000/20,000
13 October 1995	Dallas	United States	Starplex Amphitheatre	20,000/20,000
14 October 1995	Austin	United States	South Park Meadows	16,000/17,000
16 October 1995	Denver	United States	McNichols Sports Arena	17,000/18,500
18 October 1995	Phoenix	United States	Desert Sky Pavilion	20,000/20,100
19 October 1995	Las Vegas	United States	Thomas & Mack Center	14,700/15,300
21 October 1995	Mountain View	United States	Shoreline Amphitheatre	22,500/22,500
24 October 1995	Tacoma	United States	Tacoma Dome	23,000/23,000
25 October 1995	Portland	United States	The Rose Garden	19,490/21,000
28 October 1995	Inglewood	United States	Great Western Forum	35,000/35,000
29 October 1995	Inglewood	United States	Great Western Forum	35,000/35,000
31 October 1995	Los Angeles	United States	Hollywood Palladium	3,450/3,700
Europe
14 November 1995	London	England	Wembley Arena	50,000/50,000
15 November 1995	London	England	Wembley Arena	50,000/50,000
17 November 1995	London	England	Wembley Arena	50,000/50,000
18 November 1995	London	England	Wembley Arena	50,000/50,000
20 November 1995	Birmingham	England	National Exhibition Centre	30,000
21 November 1995	Birmingham	England	National Exhibition Centre	30,000
23 November 1995	Belfast	Northern Ireland	(Rescheduled for 5 December 1995) King's Hall - Played Zenith de Paris (MTV EMA) performed The Man Who Sold The World	
24 November 1995	Dublin	Republic of Ireland	Point Depot	13,000/13,000
26 November 1995	Exeter	England	Westpoint Arena	7,500/7,500
27 November 1995	Cardiff	Wales	Cardiff International Arena	12,500/12,500
29 November 1995	Aberdeen	Scotland	Exhibition Centre	8,500/8,500
30 November 1995	Glasgow	Scotland	Scottish Exhibition and Conference Centre	10,000/10,000
3 December 1995	Sheffield	England	Sheffield Arena	26,000/26,000
4 December 1995	Sheffield	England	(Cancelled) Sheffield Arena	
5 December 1995	Belfast	Northern Ireland	King's Hall	6,540/6,974
6 December 1995	Manchester	England	(Rescheduled) Nynex Arena	
7 December 1995	Newcastle upon Tyne	England	Newcastle Arena	11,000/11,000
8 December 1995	Manchester	England	Nynex Arena	21,000/21,000
13 December 1995	Birmingham	England	National Exhibition Centre (Hall 5) (Big Twix Mix Show)	15,000/15,000
17 January 1996	Helsinki	Finland	Helsinki Ice Hall	8,200/8,200
19 January 1996	Stockholm	Sweden	Globe Arena	16,000/16,000
20 January 1996	Gothenburg	Sweden	Scandinavium	14,000/14,000
22 January 1996	Oslo	Norway	Spektrum	9,700/9,700
24 January 1996	Copenhagen	Denmark	Valby-Hallen	15,000/15,000
25 January 1996	Hamburg	Germany	Sporthalle	7,000/7,000
27 January 1996	Brussels	Belgium	Vorst Forest Nationaal	8,000/8,000
28 January 1996	Utrecht	Netherlands	Prins Van Oranjehall	6,000/6,000
30 January 1996	Dortmund	Germany	Westfalenhalle	16,000/16,000
31 January 1996	Frankfurt	Germany	Festhalle	13,500/13,500
1 February 1996	Berlin	Germany	Deutschlandhalle	10,000/10,000
3 February 1996	Prague	Czech Republic	Sportovni Hala	15,000/15,000
4 February 1996	Vienna	Austria	Stadthalle	16,000/16,000
6 February 1996	Ljubljana	Slovenia	Hala Tivoli	6,000/6,000
8 February 1996	Milan	Italy	Palatrussardi	8,479/8,479
9 February 1996	Bologna	Italy	Palasport Casalecchio	5,271/5,271
11 February 1996	Lyon	France	Halle Tony Garnier	17,000/17,000
13 February 1996	Geneva	Switzerland	SEG Geneva Arena	9,500/9,500
14 February 1996	Zürich	Switzerland	Hallenstadion	11,000/11,000
16 February 1996	Amnéville	France	Le Galaxie	12,000/12,000
17 February 1996	Lille	France	Zénith de Lille	6,000/7,000
18 February 1996	Rennes	France	Salle Expos-Aeroport	3,000/3,000
20 February 1996	Paris	France	Palais Omnisports de Paris-Bercy	19,095/19,095
Total				1,040,925 / 1,050,958 (99%)

=== "Summer Festival" tour dates ===
Date	City	Country	Venue
Asia
4 June 1996	Tokyo	Japan	Nippon Budokan
5 June 1996	Tokyo	Japan	Nippon Budokan
7 June 1996	Nagoya	Japan	Nagoya Century Hall
8 June 1996	Hiroshima	Japan	Hiroshima Postal Savings Hall
10 June 1996	Osaka	Japan	Osaka-jo Hall
11 June 1996	Kitakyushu	Japan	Kyushu Welfare Pension Hall
13 June 1996	Fukuoka	Japan	Fukuoka Sunpalace
Europe and Middle East
18 June 1996	Moscow	Russia	Grand Kremlin Palace
20 June 1996 (Note: The 20 June 1996 concert in Reykjavík was part of the Arts Festival.)	Reykjavík	Iceland	Laugardalshöll
22 June 1996 (Note: The 22 June 1996 concert in Sankt Goarshausen was part of Rockpalast Open Air.)	Sankt Goarshausen	Germany	Freilichtbühne Loreley
23 June 1996 (Note: The 23 June 1996 concert in Lisbon was part of Super Bock Super Rock.)	Lisbon	Portugal	Passeio Marítimo de Alcântara
25 June 1996	Toulon	France	Zénith Oméga de Toulon
28 June 1996	Halle	Germany	Freilichtbühne Peißnitz
30 June 1996 (Note: The 30 June 1996 concert in Roskilde was part of Roskilde Festival.)	Roskilde	Denmark	Darupvej
1 July 1996	Athens	Greece	Leoforos Alexandras Stadium
3 July 1996	Tel Aviv	Israel	Yarkon Park
5 July 1996 (Note: The 5 July 1996 concert in Torhout was part of Torhout/Werchter Festival.)	Torhout	Belgium	Achiel Eeckloo Rockweide
6 July 1996 (Note: The 6 July 1996 concert in Werchter was part of Torhout/Werchter Festival.)	Werchter	Belgium	Festival Park Werchter
7 July 1996 (Note: The 7 July 1996 concert in Belfort was part of Eurockéennes.)	Belfort	France	Presqu'île de Malsaucy
9 July 1996	Rome	Italy	Stadio Olimpico
10 July 1996	Fontvieille	Monaco	Chapiteau de l'Espace Fontvieille
12 July 1996 (Note: The 12 July 1996 concert in Alt Camp was part of Doctor Music Festival.)	Alt Camp	Spain	El Pla de Santa Maria
14 July 1996	Sankt Pölten	Austria	Grabung Domplatz
16 July 1996	Rotterdam	Netherlands	Rotterdam Ahoy
18 July 1996 (Note: The 18 July 1996 concert in Stratford-upon-Avon was part of Phoenix Festival.)	Stratford-upon-Avon	England	Long Marston Airfield
20 July 1996 (Note: The 20 July 1996 concert in Balingen was part of Open Air Balingen.)	Balingen	Germany	Messegelände Balingen
21 July 1996	Bellinzona	Switzerland	Piazza del Sole
North America
6 September 1996	Philadelphia	United States	Electric Factory
7 September 1996	Washington, D.C.	United States	Capital Ballroom
13 September 1996	Boston	United States	Avalon
14 September 1996	New York City	United States	Roseland Ballroom

=== Cancelled shows ===
4 December 1995	Sheffield	Sheffield Arena	Poor ticket sales
15 June 1996	Saint Petersburg	Palace Square (White Nights Festival)	Sponsor pulled out of the show

== Songs ==
From The Man Who Sold the World

- "The Man Who Sold the World"

From Hunky Dory

- "Andy Warhol"

From The Rise and Fall of Ziggy Stardust and the Spiders from Mars

- "Moonage Daydream"

From Live Santa Monica '72

- "My Death" (originally from La Valse à mille temps (1959) by Jacques Brel; written by Brel & Mort Shuman)

From Ziggy Stardust: The Motion Picture

- "White Light/White Heat" (originally from White Light/White Heat (1968) by The Velvet Underground; written by Lou Reed)

From Aladdin Sane

- "Aladdin Sane"

From Diamond Dogs

- "Diamond Dogs"

From Low

- "Breaking Glass" (Bowie, Dennis Davis, George Murray)
- "What in the World"
- "Subterraneans"

From "Heroes"

- "'Heroes'"
- "Joe the Lion"

From Lodger

- "D.J." (Bowie, Brian Eno, Carlos Alomar)
- "Look Back in Anger" (Bowie, Eno)
- "Boys Keep Swinging" (Bowie, Eno)
- "Yassassin" (Rehearsed but not performed)

From Scary Monsters (and Super Creeps)

- "Scary Monsters (and Super Creeps)"
- "Teenage Wildlife"

From Tin Machine II

- "Baby Universal"

From Black Tie White Noise

- "Jump They Say"
- "Nite Flights" (originally from Nite Flights (1978) by The Walker Brothers; written by Noel Scott Engel)

From Outside

- "Outside" (Bowie, Kevin Armstrong)
- "The Hearts Filthy Lesson" (Bowie, Eno, Reeves Gabrels, Mike Garson, Erdal Kızılçay, Sterling Campbell)
- "A Small Plot of Land" (Bowie, Eno, Gabrels, Garson, Kızılçay)
- "Hallo Spaceboy" (Bowie, Eno)
- "The Motel" (Bowie, Eno)
- "I Have Not Been to Oxford Town" (Bowie, Eno)
- "The Voyeur of Utter Destruction (as Beauty)" (Bowie, Eno, Gabrels)
- "We Prick You" (Bowie, Eno)
- "I'm Deranged" (Bowie, Eno)
- "Thru' These Architect's Eyes" (Bowie, Gabrels)
- "Strangers When We Meet"

From Earthling

- "Little Wonder"
- "Seven Years in Tibet"
- "Telling Lies"

Other songs:

- "Under Pressure" (originally a single (1981) by Bowie and Queen from Queen's Hot Space (1982); written by Bowie, John Deacon, Brian May, Freddie Mercury, Roger Taylor)
- "Hurt" (from The Downward Spiral by Nine Inch Nails; written by Trent Reznor)
- "Reptile" (from The Downward Spiral by Nine Inch Nails, written by Reznor)
- "All the Young Dudes" (originally recorded in 1972 by Mott the Hoople, written and produced by Bowie)
- "Lust for Life" (originally recorded in 1977 by Iggy Pop, written by Bowie and Pop, produced by Bowie)
