= Quicksand (David Bowie song) =

1971 song by David Bowie

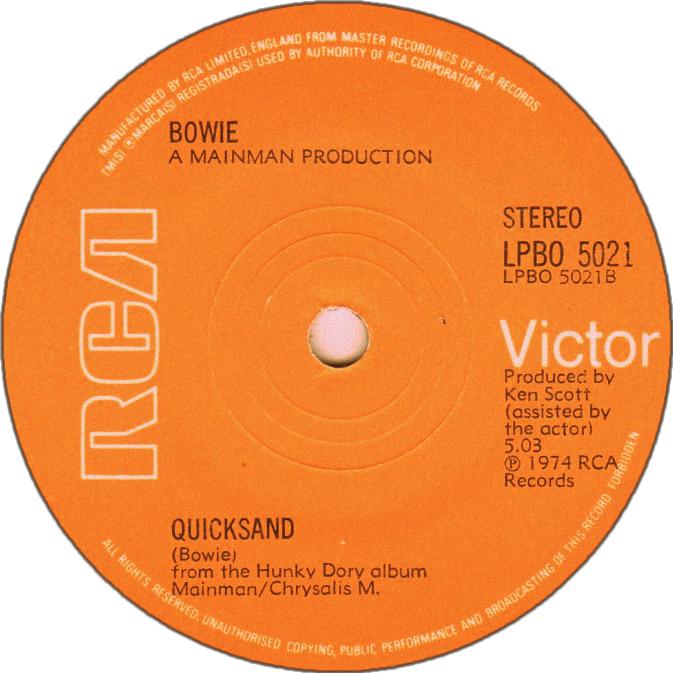
- Cover of the UK vinyl single

Song by David Bowie

from the album Hunky Dory
- Released: 17 December 1971
- Recorded: 14 July 1971
- Studio: Trident, London
- Genre: Orchestral pop; folk
- Length: 5:03
- Label: RCA
- Songwriter: David Bowie
- Producers: Ken Scott, David Bowie

"Quicksand" is a song written by the English singer-songwriter David Bowie and released on his 1971 album Hunky Dory.

== Background ==
"Quicksand" was recorded on 14 July 1971 at Trident Studios in London. This ballad features multi-tracked acoustic guitars and a string arrangement by Mick Ronson. Producer Ken Scott, having recently engineered George Harrison's album All Things Must Pass, attempted to create a similarly powerful acoustic sound with this track.

Bowie said of the song, "The chain reaction of moving around throughout the bliss and then the calamity of America produced this epic of confusion. Anyway with my esoteric problems I could have written it in Plainview or Dulwich" and that it was a mixture of "narrative and surrealism".

Lyrically the song, like much of Bowie's work at this time, was influenced by Buddhism ("You can tell me all about it on the next bardo"), occultism, and Friedrich Nietzsche's concept of the Superman. It refers to the magical society Golden Dawn and name-checks one of its most famous members, Aleister Crowley, as well as Heinrich Himmler, Winston Churchill and Juan Pujol (codename: Garbo).

David Bowie "Quicksand" (1971)
30-second sample from David Bowie's "Quicksand".

== Reception ==
NME editors Roy Carr and Charles Shaar Murray have described it as "Bowie in his darkest and most metaphysical mood", while a contemporary review in Rolling Stone remarked on its "superb singing" and "beautiful guitar motif from Mick Ronson".

== Live performances ==
Bowie performed the song during his 1997 Earthling Tour. A live recording from one show on 20 July 1997, recorded at Long Marston, England during the Phoenix Festival, was released in a live album entitled Look at the Moon! in February 2021. Bowie performed the song occasionally during his 2003-04 A Reality Tour.

Bowie performed the song at his 50th birthday concert in 1997 along with Robert Smith of The Cure.

== Other releases ==
The song was released as the B-side of the single "Rock 'n' Roll Suicide" in April 1974. RCA included the song in the picture disc set Life Time.

An impromptu hotel room performance of the song, recorded in San Francisco in February 1971, was released for the first time in 2022 on the multi-disc box set Divine Symmetry: The Journey to Hunky Dory. A studio demo version of "Quicksand", recorded in London in spring 1971, was first released as a bonus track on the Rykodisc release of Hunky Dory in 1990.

An alternate mix of the song from the mid-July 1971 recording sessions, mixed in late July for a special not-for-sale promotional album (pressed that summer for use by record company contacts and later known as BOWPROMO), received its first official CD release on the Divine Symmetry box set. That set also includes an early, previously unreleased take of "Quicksand" from the mid-July 1971 sessions, mixed in 2021.

A November 1996 tour rehearsal recording of the song, which originally aired on a BBC radio broadcast in 1997, was released in 2020 on the album ChangesNowBowie.

== Personnel ==
- David Bowie – lead vocals, acoustic guitar
- Mick Ronson – acoustic guitars, Mellotron, string arrangement
- Trevor Bolder – bass
- Mick Woodmansey – drums
- Rick Wakeman – piano
