= Moonage Daydream =

1972 song by David Bowie

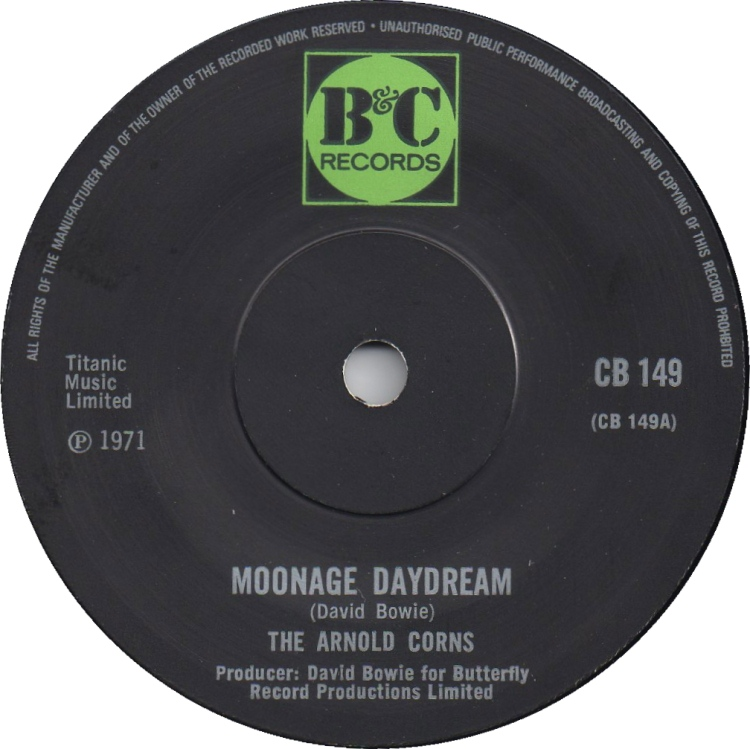
- A-side label of the 1971 UK single

Single by Arnold Corns
- B-side: "Hang On to Yourself"
- Released: May 1971
- Recorded: 25 February 1971
- Studio: Radio Luxembourg, London
- Length: 3:52
- Label: B&C
- Songwriter: David Bowie
- Producer: David Bowie

Arnold Corns singles chronology
"Moonage Daydream" (1971)	"Hang On to Yourself" (1972)

"Moonage Daydream"

Song by David Bowie

from the album The Rise and Fall of Ziggy Stardust and the Spiders from Mars
- Released: 16 June 1972
- Recorded: 12 November 1971
- Studio: Trident, London
- Genre: Glam rock
- Length: 4:37
- Label: RCA
- Songwriter: David Bowie
- Producers: David Bowie; Ken Scott

"Moonage Daydream" is a song by the English singer-songwriter David Bowie. It was originally recorded in February 1971 at Radio Luxembourg's studios in London and released as a single by his short-lived band Arnold Corns in May 1971 on B&C Records. Bowie subsequently re-recorded the song later that year with his backing band the Spiders from Mars—Mick Ronson, Trevor Bolder and Mick Woodmansey—for release on his 1972 album The Rise and Fall of Ziggy Stardust and the Spiders from Mars. The re-recording was co-produced by Ken Scott and recorded at Trident Studios in London in November 1971. The re-recording is a glam rock song that uses melodic and harmonic hooks, as well as percussion and guitar influenced by heavy metal. On the album, the song directly introduces the character Ziggy Stardust, who describes himself as a bisexual alien rock superstar who will save the Earth from the impending disaster described in the opening track "Five Years". It features saxophone played by Bowie and a guitar solo and string arrangement by Ronson.

Since its release, "Moonage Daydream" has received critical acclaim, with many deeming Ronson's guitar work its clear standout. Retrospectively, it has been named one of Bowie's greatest songs. He played it in concert throughout 1972–73 on the Ziggy Stardust Tour and on later tours. The Ziggy recording has since appeared on multiple compilation albums and in the 2014 film Guardians of the Galaxy, while the Arnold Corns recording has appeared on reissues of The Man Who Sold the World (1970) and Ziggy Stardust. The Ziggy recording has been remastered multiple times, including in 2012, which was subsequently included as part of the Five Years (1969–1973) box set in 2015, along with the Arnold Corns recording.

== Composition and recording ==
"Moonage Daydream" was written during Bowie's US promotional tour in early February 1971. After the tour Bowie formed a short-lived band, Arnold Corns, named after the Pink Floyd song "Arnold Layne". Led by Bowie, the band consisted of guitarist Mark Carr-Pritchard, bassist Peter DeSomogyi and drummer Tim Broadbent, who were known previously as a trio called Rungk. Arnold Corns recorded "Moonage Daydream" and "Hang On to Yourself" on 25 February 1971 at Radio Luxembourg's studios in London. Bowie later hired openly gay dress designer Freddie Burretti, for whom he wrote "Moonage Daydream", to be the group's frontman. Although credited as a vocalist, Burretti did not appear on either recording. Biographer Peter Doggett wrote that the original version had a "playful science-fiction-inspired chorus, two nondescript verses with a single memorable line, and an arrangement that not only racked his voice like a martyr under the Inquisition but virtually defined the word 'shambolic'." According to biographer Nicholas Pegg, the Arnold Corns version lacks the "lightness of touch" of the second. Like Doggett, Pegg criticises the recording's arrangement and Bowie's vocal, calling it a "strained attempt" at an American rock'n'roll vocal, along with an additional "come on, you mothers!" lyric. According to Marc Spitz, the Arnold Corns version is melodically the same as the Ziggy version, but with a slightly different chorus. Doggett believes that had the track and "Hang On to Yourself" not been re-recorded for Ziggy Stardust, they would have been forgotten. Author Kevin Cann writes that once the lyrics were revised and "given the Ziggy treatment", it became a "glittering glam gem" in the context of the album.

Bowie re-recorded "Moonage Daydream" on 12 November 1971 at Trident Studios in London for inclusion on The Rise and Fall of Ziggy Stardust and the Spiders from Mars. Co-produced by Ken Scott, the lineup consisted of Bowie's backing band known as the Spiders from Mars—comprising guitarist Mick Ronson, bassist Trevor Bolder and drummer Mick Woodmansey. The group recorded the track in two takes, as well as "Soul Love", "Lady Stardust" and a re-recording of The Man Who Sold the World (1970) track "The Supermen" during the session. The re-recording, like its parent album, is a glam rock song that uses melodic and harmonic hooks, as well as percussion and guitar influenced by heavy metal. Doggett states that after learning from the "vocal agonies" of the Arnold Corns recording, the Spiders decided to record the song three semitones lower than before.

Ronson begins the song on guitar with a D chord that has been described as an "avalanche", a "pile-driver", and an "opening thunderbolt" that is Ronson's "declaration of intent". Pegg writes that the chord "cuts across the fade-out" of "Soul Love" taking the listener "into the morass of sleazy sex and surreal science fiction that occupies the album's heart." After a short pause, Bowie begins his vocal, which Doggett believes sounds far better than the "metallic rasp" of his 1970 recordings. Bowie plays a saxophone and a pennywhistle during Ronson's solo, which are inspired by the Hollywood Argyles' 1960 song "Sho Know a Lot About Love"; Bowie recalled in 2003 that he thought the combination of sax and flageolet was "a great thing to put in a rock song". Ronson's guitar solo was mostly improvised after Bowie had conveyed the mood he wanted using an unconventional method. Bowie later recalled in his 2002 book Moonage Daydream that he would use a crayon or felt-tip pen to draw the "shape" of a solo. This song's solo began as a flat line that became "a fat megaphone type shape" and ended as "sprays of disassociated and broken lines". He stated that he read somewhere that Frank Zappa had used the same method to communicate solos to his musicians. Bowie was impressed that Ronson was able to use this method to bring the solo to life. The song's strings, arranged and orchestrated by Ronson, appear at the return of the chorus, climaxing in a "steep pizzicato descent". They appear again during the fadeout, this time having a "swirling phased" effect that was Scott's idea during the mixing stage. Doggett said, "Only in the final moments did Ronson's guitar provide the climactic release that the daydream demanded, continually returning to the same motifs as if in ecstatic spasm."

== Lyrics ==
As the third track on the album, "Moonage Daydream" directly introduces the character of Ziggy Stardust, following "Five Years" which describes an impending disaster that will result in Earth only having five years left and "Soul Love" in which numerous characters deal with love before the impending disaster.

Once introduced, Ziggy proclaims himself "an exotic hybrid of rock's past and mankind's future": "an alligator" (strong and remorseless), "a mama-papa" (non-gender specific), "the space invader" (alien and phallic), "a rock'n'rollin' bitch" and a "pink-monkey-bird" (gay slang for a recipient of anal sex). Ziggy also praises the virtues of "the church of man, love" (or heard as "the church of man-love"); Pegg believes that this line is inspired in part by the proposed "Church of God, Love and Man" by philosopher Thomas Paine, who Bowie often referenced indirectly (and directly on the 1990 Adrian Belew collaboration "Pretty Pink Rose").

Doggett believes that the "carefree" imagery Ziggy presents heightens the "erotic fantasy" of the chorus, described as "a wet dream that was 'moonage' for the era of the Apollo missions" and for the tradition of "muse poetry" by Robert Graves, which is linked to "ancient cults that worshipped the moon, accessing the imagination without involving the intellect." Doggett continues that as philosopher Colin Wilson said in 1971, "the moon goddess was the goddess of magic, of the subconscious, of poetic inspiration." Hence, a "moonage daydream" might represent "an ecstatic, instinctive path to creativity", or nothing more than an homage to "Marc Bolan's brand of lyrical imagery". Bowie used several Americanisms on the original version of the song, most of them retained on the re-recording, using abbreviations such as "comin'", "'lectric" and "rock'n'rollin'", as well as phrases such as "busting up my brains", "lay the real thing on me", "freak out" and "far out". According to Pegg, there are several homages present—including one to Iggy Pop, whose lyric "she got a TV eye on me" turns into "keep your 'lectric eye on me", and one to Legendary Stardust Cowboy, whose lyric "I shot my space gun" turns into "put your ray gun to my head".

== Release and reception ==
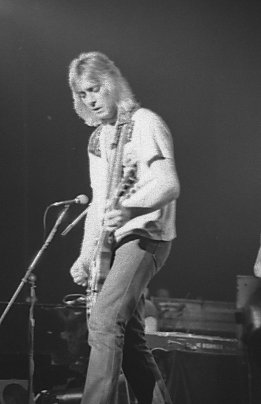
Mick Ronson's guitar work received unanimous praise from music critics, with most calling it the best aspect of the track.

The original version of "Moonage Daydream" by the short-lived band Arnold Corns was released in the UK by B&C Records as a 7-inch single with "Hang On to Yourself" as the B-side in May 1971. The re-recorded version was released as the third track on Bowie's fifth studio album The Rise and Fall of Ziggy Stardust and the Spiders from Mars, between "Soul Love" and "Starman", on 16 June 1972 by RCA Records. Discussing the song's placement in the album's track-listing, Pegg describes it as its "keystone" if one identifies the opening and closing tracks ("Five Years" and "Rock 'n' Roll Suicide", respectively) as the album's framework.

When I walked into the control room and heard "Moonage Daydream" played back through the speakers for the first time I knew then we really had something special. I'll never forget it.

— Trevor Bolder, 1993

Since its release, "Moonage Daydream" has received critical acclaim, with many deeming Ronson's guitar work as the clear standout. In his book The Complete David Bowie, Nicholas Pegg praises Ronson's guitar solo, calling it "spectacular" and a "vital ingredient" of the recording. He describes it as arguably Ronson's finest on a Bowie recording and renowned among guitarists as an "all-time classic". Reviewing the album for its 40th anniversary, Jordan Blum of PopMatters describes "Moonage Daydream", "Hang On to Yourself" and "It Ain't Easy" as "invigorating rockers" that are highlighted by Ronson's "electrifying timbres". Following Bowie's death in 2016, Rolling Stone listed "Moonage Daydream" as one of his 30 essential songs, giving unanimous praise to Ronson's guitar work, calling it some of the most "jaw-dropping" of his career. Stephen Thomas Erlewine of AllMusic praises Ronson's guitar work, writing "[Ronson] plays with a maverick flair that invigorates rockers like 'Suffragette City', 'Moonage Daydream' and 'Hang On to Yourself'." Ned Raggett, also of AllMusic, calls the track one of Bowie's "fiercest rockers ever". He continues, "As a prototype of glam rock's still-influential formula – descending, slow chords; high singing; sexually charged if not exploded imagery; thick, fat feedback; and more –it nails it on every level." He finishes his review writing: "Ronson's keyboards and final, swirling string arrangement, matched with a brilliant guitar solo, prove the icing on the cake, sealing 'Moonage Daydream' forever as a rock classic."

Ultimate Classic Rock, in their list of Bowie's ten best songs, listed "Moonage Daydream" at number three, calling it one of the most powerful songs on the album—and of his career. They praised the lyrics and Ronson's guitar work, calling it a "rock'n'roll tour de force". Ian Fortnam of Classic Rock, when ranking every track on the album from worst to best, placed the song at number six, and praised Ronson's guitar work, calling his ending guitar solo "überglamtastic" and "to die for". In 2018, NME listed the song as Bowie's 11th-greatest. Alexis Petridis of The Guardian ranked "Moonage Daydream" 33rd in his list of Bowie's 50 greatest songs, calling Ronson's guitar solo "mind-blowing" and describing it as the best example of "high-drama rock anthemics" on Ziggy Stardust. Tim Wheeler of the Northern Irish rock band Ash, in an interview with Q magazine, said, "With Bowie, you're spoilt for choice when it comes to sci-fi-inspired songs. But 'Moonage Daydream' is my favourite. It's got a great riff and it sounds really pretty in a weird kind of way, even though the lyrics are quite dark."

== Live versions ==
Bowie recorded "Moonage Daydream" for the BBC radio programme Sounds of the 70s: John Peel on 16 May 1972. This recording was later released on the album Bowie at the Beeb in 2000. Bowie performed the song throughout 1972–73 on the Ziggy Stardust Tour, where he would occasionally introduce it as "a song written by Ziggy". A live version from the tour, recorded at Santa Monica Civic Auditorium on 20 October 1972, was released on Live Santa Monica '72 (2008). It was also performed during the tour's final concert at the Hammersmith Odeon, London, on 3 July 1973, where Bowie announced: "This is the last show we'll ever do." This was later understood as the retiring of Ziggy Stardust. This recording was released on Ziggy Stardust: The Motion Picture (1983). Bowie subsequently performed the track on the Diamond Dogs Tour, and on the 1995 Outside, 1997 Earthling and 2002 Heathen tours. Recordings from the Diamond Dogs Tour have been released on David Live (1974), Cracked Actor (Live Los Angeles '74) (2017), and I'm Only Dancing (The Soul Tour 74) (2020). A live version from the Outside Tour, recorded on 13 December 1995, was released on the "Hallo Spaceboy" single in 1996. The entire concert from which the song was taken was released in 2020 as No Trendy Réchauffé (Live Birmingham 95) (2020).

== Legacy ==
The Arnold Corns version (without the spoken intro "Whenever you're ready") was released as a bonus track on the 1990 Rykodisc re-release of The Man Who Sold the World and on the 2002 reissue of Ziggy Stardust. The spoken intro was restored for release on Re:Call 1, part of the Five Years (1969–1973) compilation, in 2015.

The Ziggy Stardust recording has since appeared on multiple compilation albums, including the 1989 box set Sound + Vision, Best of Bowie (2002), Nothing Has Changed (2014), and Legacy (2016). The Ziggy recording, along with its parent album, has been remastered multiple times, including in 1990 by Rykodisc, and in 2012 for its 40th anniversary. The 2012 remaster and a 2003 remix by producer Ken Scott, along with the original Arnold Corns recording, were included in the box set Five Years (1969–1973) in 2015. A new mix of the track also appears on the 2002 reissue of Ziggy Stardust, on which, in Cann's words, Ronson's guitar is "to the fore." This mix was originally featured in a 1998 Dunlop television commercial.

In 2007, "Moonage Daydream" was made available as downloadable content for the Rock Band music video game series, as part of the "David Bowie Track Pack 01". The pack also includes cover versions of "'Heroes'" and "Queen Bitch", with "Moonage Daydream" being the only master track in that particular pack.

The song appears in the 2014 film Guardians of the Galaxy and on its soundtrack. It is heard in the film during the Guardians' entrance to Knowhere, the headquarters of the Collector. Of all the songs on the soundtrack, "Moonage Daydream" was the only song added in post-production. Director James Gunn was unsure about using it initially, but ended up choosing it over "Wichita Lineman" by Glen Campbell and "Mama Told Me (Not to Come)" by Three Dog Night.

Moonage Daydream: The Life and Times of Ziggy Stardust, a book written by Bowie, is named after the song and was published in 2002 by Genesis Publications. It documents the years 1972–73 and is fully illustrated with the photography of Mick Rock. Bowie met him in 1972 and they formed a working relationship and lasting friendship. Rock was the only photographer authorised to record the two-year career of Ziggy Stardust.

The song also served as the namesake for a 2022 documentary that consists of archival material detailing Bowie's life and career. The documentary is the first posthumous film about Bowie to be approved by his estate.

== Personnel ==
Arnold Corns version

Personnel per Kevin Cann and Nicholas Pegg.

- David Bowie – vocals, rhythm guitar, producer
- Freddie Burretti – vocals (credited)
- Mark Carr-Pritchard – guitar
- Peter DeSomogyi – bass
- Tim Broadbent – drums, tambourine

Ziggy Stardust version

Personnel per Kevin Cann and Nicholas Pegg.

- David Bowie – lead vocals, acoustic guitar, saxophone, pennywhistle, producer
- Mick Ronson – electric guitar, piano, backing vocals, string arrangements
- Trevor Bolder – bass
- Mick "Woody" Woodmansey – drums
- Ken Scott – producer

== Certifications ==
Sales certifications for "Moonage Daydream"
Region	Certification	Certified units/sales
New Zealand (RMNZ)	Gold	15,000^{‡}
United Kingdom (BPI)	Gold	400,000^{‡}
^{‡} Sales+streaming figures based on certification alone.
