= Strangers When We Meet (David Bowie song) =

1995 single by David Bowie

Single by David Bowie

from the album Outside
- B-side: "The Man Who Sold the World" (live)
- Released: 20 November 1995
- Recorded: January–February 1995; October 1995
- Studio: New York City; Westside, London
- Genre: Art rock
- Length: 4:58 (Buddha version); 5:07 (Outside version); 4:19 (edited version)
- Label: RCA
- Songwriter: David Bowie
- Producers: David Bowie; Brian Eno; Dave Richards

David Bowie singles chronology
"The Hearts Filthy Lesson" (1995)	"Strangers When We Meet" (1995)	"Hallo Spaceboy" (1996)

Music video
- "Strangers When We Meet" on YouTube

"Strangers When We Meet" is a song by English musician David Bowie, originally recorded for his 1993 album The Buddha of Suburbia. In 1995, Bowie re-recorded the song for his 20th studio album, Outside (1995), and this version was edited and released in November 1995 by RCA as the second single from the album, paired with a reworked version of Bowie's 1970 song "The Man Who Sold the World". The double A-side reached number 39 on the UK Singles Chart. In Sweden, "Strangers When We Meet" peaked at number 56 in 1996.

== Development ==
"Strangers When We Meet" is a song that Bowie recorded three times: once in 1993 with Reeves Gabrels and his band Modern Farmer (unreleased), once in 1993 with Bowie and Erdal Kızılçay for release on the album The Buddha of Suburbia, and then again in 1994–95 for inclusion on Outside. Both biographers Nicholas Pegg and Chris O'Leary agree that the song seemed out-of-place on Outside: Pegg says that song, "at the end of 1. Outside's art-rock insanity, 'Strangers When We Meet' seems even more incongruous, resolving all the album's angst and black comedy in a soothing slice of conventional pop", and O'Leary calls the song "transient" and not suited on either of the albums on which it appeared, with the song almost seeming like a bonus track appended at the end of Outside. The Buddha version is called "tense, more compact, nervier" compared to the "lush" version on Outside.

== Critical reception ==
Roger Morton from NME named the song "the album's most conventional moment", describing it as a "romantic rock ballad".

== Release and promotion ==
The single was released on 20 November 1995. While most versions were of the newer Outside version of the song, an American promo CD included a rare single edit of the Buddha of Suburbia version, and a rare 1993 promo cassette contained a different version still of the Buddha recording, and featured different percussion and mixing.

Samuel Bayer’s video for the song shared some visual similarities with that for "The Hearts Filthy Lesson", but was a more simple and placid affair set in a decaying artist's studio.

== Live performances ==
In promotion of the album and single, Bowie performed "Strangers When We Meet" four times on various shows in the US and UK. First, on 27 October 1995, it was performed on The Tonight Show with Jay Leno. On 10 November 1995, Bowie performed an unfortunately "lacklustre" version of the song on Top of the Pops while in the middle of rehearsals for the Outside Tour, and then played it again on 2 December 1995 on Later... with Jools Holland. It was performed one more time live on TV on 26 January 1996 on French TV's Taratata. Subsequently, the song was performed occasionally during Bowie's 1995–1996 Outside Tour and 1997's Earthling Tour. One recording of the song, recorded during the Outside Tour, was released on No Trendy Réchauffé (Live Birmingham 95) (2020), which takes its name from a lyric fragment from the song.

== Other releases ==
The 1995 rerecording of the song appeared on the Best of Bowie DVD (2002) and the 3-CD version of Nothing Has Changed (2014).

== B-sides ==
While the version of "The Man Who Sold the World" was labelled a "live version", it was actually a studio-recorded track based on a reworked version of the song recorded in late October 1995 and performed on the Outside Tour, and mixed by Brian Eno. This version was re-released in 2020 on the EP Is It Any Wonder?

"Get Real" was released as a bonus track to the Japanese release of Outside in 1995, as a b-side to this single, and again on the 2004 re-release of Outside and in the 2007 David Bowie (box set). The song, a leftover from the Outside sessions, was described as a "far more conventional pop-rock composition than anything on the album" with a reference to some of Bowie's own "unlamented" mid-Eighties work. A sheet of paper dated 6 March 1994, on display at the David Bowie Is exhibit, showed that this song's lyrics were at least partly run through the Verbasizer program, which Bowie liked to use like scissors and paper to cut up and re-arrange his lyrics. Pegg called the song "an appealing glimpse into the wealth of extra material recorded during the [Outside] sessions, and another example of Bowie's ongoing preoccupation with the nature of reality."

== Track listings ==
- 7-inch version
1. "Strangers When We Meet" (edit) (Bowie) – 4:19
2. "The Man Who Sold the World" (live) (Bowie) – 3:35
- UK CD version
1. "Strangers When We Meet" (edit) (Bowie) – 4:19
2. "The Man Who Sold the World" (live) (Bowie) – 3:35
3. "Strangers When We Meet" (album version) (Bowie) – 5:06
4. "Get Real" (Bowie, Eno)
- US CD version
1. "Strangers When We Meet" (album version) (Bowie) – 5:06
2. "Strangers When We Meet" (Buddha of Suburbia album version) (Bowie) – 5:06
3. "The Man Who Sold the World" (live) (Bowie) – 3:35
- Australian CD version
1. "Strangers When We Meet" (edit) (Bowie) – 4:19
2. "The Man Who Sold the World" (live) (Bowie) – 3:35
3. "Strangers When We Meet" (album version) (Bowie) – 5:06
4. "Strangers When We Meet" (Buddha of Suburbia album version) (Bowie) – 5:06

== Personnel ==
According to Chris O'Leary:

Buddha of Suburbia version

- David Bowie – lead and backing vocal, guitar, synthesiser, producer
- Erdal Kızılçay – guitar, synthesisers, bass, drums, producer

Outside version

- David Bowie – lead and backing vocal, producer
- Reeves Gabrels – guitar
- Carlos Alomar – guitar
- Tom Frish – guitar
- Mike Garson – piano
- Kızılçay or Yossi Fine – bass
- Sterling Campbell or Joey Baron – drums
- Brian Eno – treatments, producer
- David Richards – engineer

== Charts ==
Chart (1995–1996)	Peak position
Netherlands (Single Top 100)	9
Sweden (Sverigetopplistan)	56
UK Singles (OCC)	39

== Release history ==
Region	Date	Format(s)	Label(s)	Ref.
United States	6 November 1995	Rock radio	Virgin	
United Kingdom	20 November 1995	CD; cassette	Hut	
