= LiveAndWell.com =

2000 live album by David Bowie

Live album by David Bowie
- Released: 13 September 2000 (original release); 15 January 2021 (re-release)
- Recorded: Paradiso, Amsterdam (10 June 1997); Phoenix Festival, Long Marston Airfield, England (19 June 1996); Radio City Music Hall, New York (15 October 1997); Metropolitan, Rio de Janeiro (2 November 1997)
- Length: 57:17
- Label: Risky Folio
- Producer: Reeves Gabrels; Mark Plati; George Marino

David Bowie chronology
Hours (1999)	LiveAndWell.com (2000)	Bowie at the Beeb (2000)
No Trendy Réchauffé (Live Birmingham 95) (2020)	LiveAndWell.com (re-release) (2021)	Look at the Moon! (Live Phoenix Festival 97) (2021)

LiveAndWell.com is a 2000 limited edition live album by David Bowie. It was not available commercially and could only be acquired by being subscribed to BowieNet at the time. The album is made up of recordings from the 1997 Earthling Tour, featuring songs from the albums Outside (1995) and Earthling (1997).

In late 2020, it was announced that the album would be released publicly for the first time on 15 January 2021.

== Background ==
Following the successful Earthling Tour, Bowie, Reeves Gabrels and Mark Plati mixed a live album, intending it for a commercial release. However, Virgin, Bowie's label at the time, scrapped the release when it was submitted to them in late 1998. During the mixing of this live album, Bowie and the band also recorded "Fun" and a cover of Bob Dylan's "Tryin' to Get to Heaven". Some of these live tracks, as well as a remix of the song "Fun", were then released to subscribers of BowieNet as downloads before being released as the album LiveAndWell.com. The cover of "Tryin' to Get to Heaven" was played once on a Spanish radio station and was unavailable for over 20 years until its release in early 2021. "Fun" remained unreleased for almost 20 years until it was included on Is It Any Wonder? (2020) as the "Clownboy mix" version of the song.

The track listing for the release contains an error according to Bowie biographer Nicholas Pegg: "The Hearts Filthy Lesson", while being listed as being recorded in 1997's Phoenix Festival, is in fact from the Phoenix Festival the year prior.

== Releases ==
The original release of the CD in 2000 came with a bonus disc made up of four rare remixes, which has not been re-released since. The album was digitally reissued on 15 May 2020 without this second CD of songs, although the "Fun" remix was released as a separate digital download on its own. The digital re-issue included two tracks recorded from the Earthling Tour when Bowie's band performed under the pseudonym "Tao Jones Index".

In January 2021, LiveAndWell.com was re-released on vinyl and CD, again without the second CD of remixes as part of the six-album set Brilliant Live Adventures.

== Reviews ==
Pegg called the album a "beautifully mixed and hugely impressive memento of Bowie's mid-1990s live experience".

== Track listing ==
Disc one
No.	Title	Original album	Length
1.	"I'm Afraid of Americans" (Live at Radio City Music Hall, New York, 15 October 1997)	Earthling	5:14
2.	"The Hearts Filthy Lesson" (Live at Long Marston, Phoenix Festival, 18 July 1996 (track listing incorrectly states the date as 20 July 1997))	Outside	5:37
3.	"I'm Deranged" (Live from Amsterdam, Paradiso, 10 June 1997)	Outside	7:12
4.	"Hallo Spaceboy" (Live from Rio de Janeiro, Metropolitan, 2 November 1997)	Outside	5:12
5.	"Telling Lies" (Live from Amsterdam, Paradiso, 10 June 1997)	Earthling	5:14
6.	"The Motel" (Live from Amsterdam, Paradiso, 10 June 1997)	Outside	5:49
7.	"The Voyeur of Utter Destruction (as Beauty)" (Live from Rio de Janeiro, Metropolitan, 2 November 1997)	Outside	5:48
8.	"Battle for Britain (The Letter)" (Live at Radio City Music Hall, New York, 15 October 1997)	Earthling	4:35
9.	"Seven Years in Tibet" (Live at Radio City Music Hall, New York, 15 October 1997)	Earthling	6:19
10.	"Little Wonder" (Live at Radio City Music Hall, New York, 15 October 1997)	Earthling	6:19

Disc two (Remixes)
No.	Title	Length
1.	"Fun" (Dillinja mix)	5:52
2.	"Little Wonder" (Danny Saber Dance mix)	5:32
3.	"Dead Man Walking" (Moby mix 1)	7:32
4.	"Telling Lies" (Paradox mix)	5:11

== Personnel ==
- David Bowie – vocals, guitar, saxophone
- Reeves Gabrels – guitar, vocals
- Gail Ann Dorsey – bass, vocals, keyboards
- Zack Alford – drums
- Mike Garson – keyboards, synthesizer, piano
- Live show sound engineers;
- Michael Prowda – monitors
- Steve Guest – FOH
