= Earthling in the City =

EP by David Bowie
- Released: October 1997 / November 1997
- Length: 30:24

David Bowie chronology
The Best of David Bowie 1969/1974 (1997)	Earthling in the City (1997)	The Best of David Bowie 1974/1979 (1998)

Earthling in the City is a 6-track promotional CD by David Bowie that was distributed by the American GQ magazine with their November 1997 issue. The disc is largely made up of live performances and remixes of songs drawn from Bowie's albums Black Tie White Noise, Outside, and Earthling.

== Background ==
Distributed solely with an issue of GQ in late 1997, the EP includes two exclusive live tracks from Bowie's 50th birthday party concert in January that year; the rest of the tracks had been released with other singles over the previous year.

== Track listing ==
1. "Little Wonder" (Recorded live in New York City, 9 January 1997) – 3:44
2. "Seven Years in Tibet (Edit)" – 3:59
3. "Pallas Athena" (Recorded live in Amsterdam, 10 June 1997) – 8:28
4. "The Hearts Filthy Lesson" (Recorded live in New York City, 9 January 1997) – 5:03
5. "Telling Lies (Paradox Mix by A Guy Called Gerald)" – 5:12
6. "Seven Years in Tibet (Mandarin Version)" – 3:58
