= I'm Deranged =

Song by David Bowie

from the album Outside
- Released: September 25, 1995
- Genre: Industrial rock
- Length: 4:29
- Label: RCA
- Songwriters: David Bowie, Brian Eno, David Richards

"I'm Deranged" is a song written by David Bowie and Brian Eno in 1995 for the album Outside. Musically and lyrically, it shares many themes with "Look Back in Anger" from Lodger (1979), including the appearance of an angel figure before an artist. The two songs were frequently played together during the 1995 Outside Tour.

== Other releases ==
- Two different edits were featured in the film Lost Highway in 1997. The song was played during both the intro and the end credits and appears on the soundtrack.
- A "Jungle remix" was released on the single "Dead Man Walking" in March 1997.
- This jungle mix was played live often during the dance set of the Earthling Tour. One of these performances appeared on the live album LiveAndWell.com.

== Cover versions ==
- Sybil Vane – .2 Contamination: A Tribute to David Bowie (2006)
- Müslüm Gürses – Aşk Tesadüfleri Sever (2006) (covered with Turkish lyrics, renamed as "Kış Oldum")
- Thomas Truax – Songs from the films of David Lynch (2009)
- Get well soon – Vexations (ltd. Deluxe Edt. (2010)
- Jessica 6 (ex-Hercules and Love Affair) – We Were So Turned On: A Tribute to David Bowie (2010)
- Mike Gordon - The Egg (2011)
- AXXºNN ⤳ (featuring Sandy Cove) – Terrible Mix (2024)

== Other ==
The song "I'm Deranged" was featured as the opening title and end credits music for David Lynch's 1997 film Lost Highway. For the end credits Bowie's vocals start a cappella for the first couple of lines, before the backing track fades up.
