= Little Wonder (David Bowie song) =

1997 single by David Bowie

Single by David Bowie

from the album Earthling
- Released: 27 January 1997
- Recorded: 1996
- Studio: Looking Glass (New York City)
- Genre: Industrial rock; noise rock; jungle
- Length: 3:40 (single version); 6:02 (album version)
- Label: Parlophone
- Songwriters: David Bowie; Reeves Gabrels; Mark Plati
- Producers: David Bowie; Reeves Gabrels; Mark Plati

David Bowie singles chronology
"Telling Lies" (1996)	"Little Wonder" (1997)	"Dead Man Walking" (1997)

Music video
- "Little Wonder" on YouTube

"Little Wonder" is a song by English musician David Bowie, released as the second single from his 21st album, Earthling (1997). "Little Wonder" backed by three remixes, was issued on 27 January 1997. The single was a success, peaking at number 14 in the UK and topping the Western chart in Japan. The accompanying music video was directed by Floria Sigismondi and depicts Bowie at three different ages. Biographer David Buckley considers it a dance-oriented video rather than a rock one, reminiscent of Orbital's "The Box" (1996).

"Little Wonder" was one of the first tracks Bowie and Reeves Gabrels wrote for the album. Bowie called writing the track a "ridiculous" exercise in pure stream of consciousness: "I just picked Snow White and the Seven Dwarves and made a line for each of the dwarves' names. And that's the song [laughs]. And then I ran out of dwarves' names, so there's new dwarves in it like 'Stinky'." Originally set to be a "nine-minute jungle electronic epic", the song was trimmed to six minutes for the album. Described by biographer Chris O'Leary as a combination of arena rock and electronica, it utilises percussion and power chords from the Prodigy's "Firestarter", a 1996 UK number one that assisted in bringing drum and bass rhythms to the mainstream.

== Background ==
The sampled spoken line "If it's good to ya, it's gotta be good for ya" during the instrumental break, comes from the spoken intro of a live Steely Dan song called "Bodhisattva" from the Citizen Steely Dan box.

Two main interpretations to the lyrics are given by James E. Perone, who writes that the song may simply represent some characteristics of Bowie's own personality or, in another case, an alien observing aspects of the life on Earth. Bowie uses the names of all seven dwarfs in the lyrics.

The drum break is sampled from The Winstons instrumental, "Amen, Brother", a popular drum solo and sample commonly referred to as the "Amen break," while the chord progression is similar to an early David Bowie song, "Can't Help Thinking About Me."

Title	Mix and additional production	Duration	Additional credits and notes
Album Version	Mark Plati	6:02	
Edit	Mark Plati	3:40	
Censored Video Edit	Mark Plati	4:09	Released on 2004 Earthling 2 CD.
Ambient Junior Mix	Junior Vasquez	9:55	Programmed by Frederick Jorio.
Club Dub Junior Mix	Junior Vasquez	8:10	Programmed by Frederick Jorio.
4/4 Junior Mix	Junior Vasquez	8:10	Programmed by Frederick Jorio.
Juniors Club Instrumental	Junior Vasquez	8:14	Programmed by Frederick Jorio.
Danny Saber Mix	Danny Saber	3:06	Cello by David Coleman, sonic hair and make up by John X.
Danny Saber Dance Mix	Danny Saber	5:30	Cello by David Coleman, sonic hair and make up by John X.

== Critical reception ==
British magazine Music Week rated the song three out of five, adding, "The idea of giving Bowie a drum & bass makeover sounds slightly absurd but, though disconcerting, it seems to work. The central song, however, is a little understated and something a little more bold might have worked better." David Sinclair from The Times wrote, "Racing jungle beats and strafing bursts of ultra-distorted guitar underpin the first taster from Bowie's new album, Earthling. Quite a grower even if it does sound, in places, disconcertingly like Babylon Zoo."

Christopher Sandford calls "Little Wonder" Bowie's "most exciting and upbeat single since 'Blue Jean' [1984]".

== Live versions ==
Bowie performed "Little Wonder" as the opening song at his fiftieth birthday celebration concert in New York City on 9 January 1997. This performance was included on the Earthling in the City CD. Bowie played the song live (along with "Scary Monsters (And Super Creeps)") on the 8 February 1997 episode of Saturday Night Live. A July 1997 performance at the Phoenix Festival was released in 2021 on Look at the Moon! (Live Phoenix Festival 97). The song was performed at the GQ Awards in New York City on 15 October 1997, later released on the live album LiveAndWell.com in 2000. Bowie's 25 June 2000 performance of the song at the Glastonbury Festival was released in 2018 on Glastonbury 2000. A live version recorded at BBC Radio Theatre, London, on 27 June 2000 was released on the bonus disc accompanying the first releases of Bowie at the Beeb in 2000.

== Other releases ==
- The "Danny Saber remix" appeared on the soundtrack for the European release of The Saint as well as the second soundtrack for the movie Hackers. This remix also appeared on the four-track bonus disc that followed the live album LiveAndWell.com in 2000.
- A video edit was released on a Jukebox 7" release of the single "Dead Man Walking" in 1997.
- Three remixes, "Censored Video Edit", "Junior Vasquez Club Mix" and "Danny Saber Dance Mix", also appeared on the bonus disc of the Digibook Expanded Edition of Earthling from 2004.
- The single version has been included on compilation albums: some editions of Best of Bowie (2002), the 3-disc and 2-disc versions of Nothing Has Changed (2014), and the 2-disc edition of Bowie Legacy (2016).
- A new 'Unplugged' Danny Saber Mix was released on streaming services to commemorate Earthling's 25th anniversary in February 2022.

== Music video ==
The accompanying music video for "Little Wonder" was directed by Floria Sigismondi, an Italian-Canadian photographer and director. It is set in a dystopian world of mutants, depicting rapid-pace shots of Bowie as an aging Ziggy Stardust and Halloween Jack wandering the New York streets and subways. The video includes video sculptures by the artist Tony Oursler. Bowie has said of Sigismondi's work, "I thought she just has a wonderful eye, great textures, fabulous cutting." The video is in the permanent collection of the Museum of Modern Art, New York.

== Track listings ==
- UK CD version one
1. "Little Wonder" (edit) – 3:40
2. "Little Wonder" (Ambient Junior Mix) – 9:55
3. "Little Wonder" (Club Dub Junior Mix) – 8:10
4. "Little Wonder" (4/4 Junior Mix) – 8:10
5. "Little Wonder" (Juniors Club Instrumental) – 8:14
- UK CD version two (limited edition)
1. "Little Wonder" (edit) – 3:40
2. "Telling Lies" (Adam F Mix) – 3:58
3. "Jump They Say" (Leftfield 12" Vocal Mix) – 7:40
4. "Little Wonder" (Danny Saber Mix)" – 3:06
- US CD version
1. "Little Wonder" (Album version) – 6:02
2. "Little Wonder" (Ambient Junior Mix) – 9:55
3. "Little Wonder" (Club Dub Junior Mix) – 8:10
4. "Little Wonder" (Danny Saber Dance Mix) – 5:30
- European CD version one
1. "Little Wonder" (Album version) – 6:02
2. "Little Wonder" (Ambient Junior Mix) – 9:55
3. "Little Wonder" (Danny Saber Mix) – 3:06
4. "Little Wonder" (Club Dub Junior Mix) – 8:10
5. "Little Wonder" (4/4 Junior Mix) – 8:10
- European CD version two
1. "Little Wonder" (edit) – 3:40
2. "Little Wonder" (Junior Club Mix) – 8:10
3. "Telling Lies" (Adam F Mix) – 3:58
- European CD version three
1. "Little Wonder" (edit) – 3:40
2. "Telling Lies" (Adam F Mix) – 3:58
- Japanese CD version
1. "Little Wonder" (edit) – 3:40
2. "Little Wonder" (Junior Club Mix) – 8:10
3. "Little Wonder" (Danny Saber Mix) – 3:06
4. "Little Wonder" (Club Dub Junior Mix) – 8:10
5. "Little Wonder" (4/4 Junior Mix) – 8:10
- UK 12" version
1. "Little Wonder" (Junior Club Mix) – 8:10
2. "Little Wonder" (Danny Saber Mix) – 5:30
3. "Telling Lies" (Adam F Mix) – 3:58
- European 12" version
1. "Little Wonder" (Junior Club Mix) – 8:10
2. "Little Wonder" (Danny Saber Mix) – 5:30

An additional three promo CD singles were also released.

== Production credits ==
Producer

- David Bowie
- Mark Plati – (co-producer)
- Reeves Gabrels – (co-producer)

Musicians

- David Bowie – vocals, samples, guitar, keyboards
- Reeves Gabrels – programming, real and sampled guitars, vocals
- Mark Plati – drum loops, electronic percussion, programming, loops, samples
- Gail Ann Dorsey – bass
- Zachary Alford – drums
- Mike Garson – keyboards, piano

== Charts ==
Weekly chart performance
Chart (1997)	Peak position
Australia (ARIA)	94
Belgium (Ultratip Flanders)	19
Canada Top Singles (RPM)	59
Finland (Suomen virallinen lista)	10
Ireland (IRMA)	27
Italy Airplay (Music & Media)	8
Netherlands (Dutch Top 40)	32
Netherlands (Single Top 100)	50
Scotland (OCC)	14
UK Dance (Official Charts)	20
UK Singles (OCC)	14

== Cover versions ==
- Haitian Hate Gods – .2 Contamination: A Tribute to David Bowie (2006)
- Idiots Loop - Cover Ups (2019)
