= Seven Years in Tibet (song) =

Single by David Bowie

from the album Earthling
- Released: 18 August 1997
- Studio: Looking Glass (New York City)
- Genre: Grunge; drum and bass; industrial rock; blue-eyed soul
- Length: 4:01 (single edit/Fleeting Moment); 6:21 (album version)
- Label: BMG; Arista
- Producers: David Bowie; Reeves Gabrels; Mark Plati

David Bowie singles chronology
"Dead Man Walking" (1997)	"Seven Years in Tibet" (1997)	"Pallas Athena" (1997)

"Seven Years in Tibet" is a song written by English musician David Bowie and Reeves Gabrels from the 1997 album, Earthling. It was released as the album's fourth single. In some territories, a version of the song sung by Bowie in Mandarin Chinese was released as "A Fleeting Moment".

"Seven Years in Tibet" peaked at number 61 in the UK, and was the last number one song in Hong Kong before the Chinese takeover in June of 1997.

== Song development ==
"Seven Years in Tibet" was recorded between August and November 1996 during the Earthling studio sessions. It started out as a Reeves Gabrels instrumental called "Brussels", which Bowie was not impressed with, but eventually Gabrels convinced Bowie to keep. The song's working title was "Biscuit Lady" and its opening lines were from a hoax Internet article in which a woman, wounded by an exploding biscuit container, thinks the biscuit dough on her head are her brains leaking out of her skull. Eventually, the song became a song about a "young Tibetan monk who's just been shot" after Bowie read some of the 14th Dalai Lama's lectures. Bowie chose the name of the song after reading the book Seven Years in Tibet (1952), and, although a movie of the same name that was also based on the book was also released in 1997, it had no relation to Bowie's song. Bowie recorded a version of the song sung in Mandarin Chinese, with lyrics translated by Lin Xi and released with the name "A Fleeting Moment" in some territories. In Hong Kong, the release marked Bowie as the first non-Asian artist to reach number one in that territory.

== Critical reception ==
A reviewer from Music Week rated the song three out of five, writing, "This roaring, industrialised grunger, already a mandarin-language number one in Hong Kong, sounds like an out-take from the Scary Monster years. But for all its gruff raucousness, it may be a little too one-dimensional." The magazine's Alan Jones commented, "Having donated Planet Of Dreams to the Long Live Tibet album project, David Bowie continues to promote the cause of the Himalayan nation currently under the rule of China with his new single (...). A dense and fairly dark piece of brooding intensity, it takes no musical references from its lyrical inspiration and explodes occasionally with metallic guitars akimbo before stumping back into sulky periods. It takes a little getting used to, but ultimately emerges as one of his more compelling recent pieces." Alan Jackson from The Times said that here, "drum 'n' bass David goes all mystical on us."

== Live versions ==
At Bowie's 50th Birthday Bash concert in January 1997, Bowie performed this song together with Dave Grohl of Foo Fighters. A July 1997 performance at the Phoenix Festival was released in 2021 on Look at the Moon! (Live Phoenix Festival 97). Bowie played the song at GQ Awards in New York City on 15 October 1997, a performance which was later released on the live album LiveAndWell.com in 2000.

== Other releases ==
In the US, the "Mandarin version" was released on Earthling in the City, a promotional CD distributed in the November 1997 issue of GQ magazine. In Hong Kong, it was released on a separate bonus disc that followed the release of Earthling in 1997. It also appeared on the bonus disc of the Digibook Expanded Edition of Earthling from 2004.

== Track listing ==
All lyrics written by David Bowie, except "Seven Years in Tibet (Mandarin version)" by Lin Xi.
All music composed by David Bowie and Reeves Gabrels, except "Pallas Athena (live)" by David Bowie.

=== 7-inch single: RCA / 74321 51254 7 (UK) ===
1. "Seven Years in Tibet (edit)" – 4:01
2. "Seven Years in Tibet (Mandarin version)" – 3:58

=== RCA / 74321 51255 2 (UK) ===
1. "Seven Years in Tibet (edit)" – 4:01
2. "Seven Years in Tibet (Mandarin version)" – 3:58
3. "Pallas Athena (live)" – 8:18
- Also available as limited edition digipak (RCA / 74321 51254 2)

== Production credits ==
- Producers:
  - David Bowie
  - Mark Plati (co-producer)
  - Reeves Gabrels (co-producer)
- Musicians:
  - David Bowie – vocals, guitar, saxophone, samples, keyboards
  - Reeves Gabrels – programming, synthesizers, real and sampled guitars, vocals
  - Mark Plati – programming, loops, samples, keyboards
  - Gail Ann Dorsey – bass guitar, vocals
  - Zachary Alford – drum loops, acoustic drums, electronic percussion
  - Mike Garson – keyboards, piano

== Charts ==
Chart (1997)	Peak position
Hong Kong	1
Scotland (OCC)	61
UK Singles (OCC)	61
