= Telling Lies =

Telling Lies may refer to:

- Telling Lies (video game), a 2019 video game
- "Telling Lies" (song), a 1996 song by David Bowie
