= Telling Lies (song) =

1996 single by David Bowie

Single by David Bowie

from the album Earthling
- Released: 4 November 1996
- Recorded: February–May 1996
- Studio: Mountain (Montreux); Looking Glass (New York City)
- Genre: Alternative rock; jungle; drum and bass
- Length: 4:49 (album version); 5:07 (Feelgood mix version)
- Label: Arista; BMG
- Songwriter: David Bowie
- Producer: David Bowie

David Bowie singles chronology
"Hallo Spaceboy" (1996)	"Telling Lies" (1996)	"Little Wonder" (1997)

"Telling Lies" is a song by English singer-songwriter David Bowie, written and released for downloading and as a single in 1996 and later included on his 21st studio album, Earthling (1997). The song was initially an Internet-only release and was the first-ever downloadable single by a major artist. No music video was produced for the song.

Three versions of "Telling Lies" were released on Bowie's official website beginning 11 September 1996 – one version for each of three weeks. According to issued press releases, over 300,000 people downloaded the original release. Two months later, it was released as a single by BMG.

== Background ==
Released in November 1996, three months ahead of the album, Bowie launched the single with an online chat session, where he and two other people —Reeves Gabrels and Pat Briggs— pretending to be him answered questions from the audience. Bowie told the truth; the other two "told lies". The chat audience was asked to vote on which chat personality was the "real" Bowie; according to a transcript of the chat session, the "real" Bowie came in first, although a contemporary source claimed he ended up coming in third, with Bowie saying of his 3rd place showing "I was answering as honestly as was necessary or appropriate. I guess a public figure is anybody you want to make him. Obviously I'm not the figure that people think I am. So it was kind of gratifying [to not come in first in the voting]."

== Internet release ==
For me and for people like Prince who have an overwriting dilemma, I thought [releasing music online] would be a perfect way to unload material [that the record company won't release]'.

— David Bowie on releasing music on the Internet

Bowie had mulled over the idea of releasing music on the Internet, but Bowie says prodding from Nancy Berry, then Executive Vice President at Virgin Records, helped make the idea a reality. Bowie called her support "courageous", saying that making music available (at that time) was "a dangerous move for corporations to make." The success of the song's download led to Bowie consider making other music available online as well, saying: "I'm waiting for the moment when downloading [music] can happen in real time. It would be so cool to have a ten-minute piece of music that you could download in ten minutes... I'm thinking of putting up stuff that my record company would consider too esoteric, or too left-field, or too avant-garde for their own needs."

In early September 1996, 3 versions of the song were made available at CD quality for free for users who visited Bowie's official website, https://www.davidbowie.com.

== Promotion and live performances ==
Mixes of the song were released on physical media as a bonus track on the Japanese release of Earthling, on the UK limited release of the single "Little Wonder" in January 1997, on the UK 12" release of the single "Dead Man Walking" in April 1997, and on the bonus disc of the Digibook Expanded Edition of Earthling in 2004.

When the song was performed live in late 1996, it was noted in reviews that many in the audience did not know what it was because it was only available online. A version recorded at Paradiso, Amsterdam, Holland on 10 June 1997, was released on LiveAndWell.com in 2000.

== Critical reception ==
Larry Flick from Billboard magazine noted that the song "shows the venerable artist cast within vigorous jungle environment crafted by A Guy Called Gerald." He added, "Start sprinting to your trusty import shop now." Alan Jones from Music Week wrote, "Bowie's vocals are somewhere between spoken and sung over a rhythm-heavy and unsettling track that lapses into jungle rhythms. It will certainly make his Seventies fans look askance, though the hipper young things about town will embrace it." James Hyman from the Record Mirror Dance Update gave it a score of four out of five, adding, "Assured via the media that this would be available as 'internet only' despite the fact that limited copies were sent to selected record shops (I picked mine up from Camden's Record & Tape Exchange!), this drum & bass double-pack will excite. A Guy Called Gerald hits hard with Bowie's occasionally stretched vocoded vocals resting firmly over thrashing breakbeat. Adam F works a full vocal into his inimitable freestyle 'jungle jazz'. Finally, Bowie himself provides a more grating mix with an aggressive pace."

== Track listing ==
1. "Telling Lies" (Feelgood mix by Mark Plati) – 5:07
2. "Telling Lies" (Paradox mix by A Guy Called Gerald) – 5:10
3. "Telling Lies" (Adam F mix) – 3:58

A limited edition CD with a different cover was released with the same tracks. There is also a double 12" vinyl promo release which includes the three mixes of which the A Guy Called Gerald mix appears twice.

== Personnel ==
According to Chris O'Leary:

- David Bowie – lead and backing vocal, loops, keyboards
- Reeves Gabrels – lead guitar, loops, synthesisers
- Mark Plati – loops, synthesiser
- Mike Garson – keyboards
- Gail Ann Dorsey – bass, vocals
- Zachary Alford – drums

Technical

- David Bowie – producer
- Reeves Gabrels – producer
- Mark Plati – producer, engineer

== Charts ==
Chart (1996–97)	Peak positions
Scotland (OCC)	79
UK Dance (Official Charts)	35
UK Singles (OCC)	76
