= Earthling (David Bowie album) =

1997 studio album by David Bowie

Studio album by David Bowie
- Released: 3 February 1997
- Recorded: April, August–October 1996
- Studios: Mountain (Montreux); Looking Glass (New York City)
- Genres: Industrial rock; electronica; drum and bass; jungle; techno
- Length: 48:57
- Labels: Arista; BMG; RCA; Virgin
- Producers: David Bowie; Reeves Gabrels; Mark Plati

David Bowie chronology
BBC Sessions 1969–1972 (Sampler) (1996)	Earthling (1997)	The Deram Anthology 1966–1968 (1997)

Singles from Earthling
- 1. "Telling Lies" Released: 4 November 1996; 2. "Little Wonder" Released: 27 January 1997; 3. "Dead Man Walking" Released: 14 April 1997; 4. "Seven Years in Tibet" Released: 18 August 1997; 5. "I'm Afraid of Americans" Released: 14 October 1997

Earthling (stylised as EART HL I NG) is the twenty-first studio album by the English musician David Bowie, released on 3 February 1997 through RCA Records in the United Kingdom, Virgin Records in the United States, and Arista Records/BMG in other territories. Mostly self-produced by Bowie, it was primarily recorded from August to October 1996 at New York City's Looking Glass Studios. Bowie composed the tracks with Reeves Gabrels and Mark Plati, who are credited as co-producers, with Mike Garson, Gail Ann Dorsey and Zack Alford providing overdubs later.

Developing musical styles previously explored on Outside (1995), Earthling showcases an electronica-influenced sound partly inspired by the industrial and drum and bass culture of the 1990s, further exhibiting jungle and techno styles. Lyrically, the tracks express themes of alienation and spirituality. One of them, "I'm Afraid of Americans", was remixed for release as a single by Nine Inch Nails' Trent Reznor, who appeared in its music video. The artwork depicts Bowie wearing a Union Jack coat co-designed by Alexander McQueen.

Earthling charted better than its predecessor and reached the top ten in several countries. Its accompanying singles featured numerous remixes and were supported with music videos. Bowie promoted the album through television appearances and on the Earthling Tour in 1997. Although the album was mostly received positively on release, later reviews find Earthling lacked innovation in a time when the drum and bass craze was well-established; others consider it a worthwhile addition to an underrated decade for Bowie. It was reissued with bonus tracks in 2004 and remastered in 2021 for inclusion on the box set Brilliant Adventure (1992–2001).

== Background and recording ==
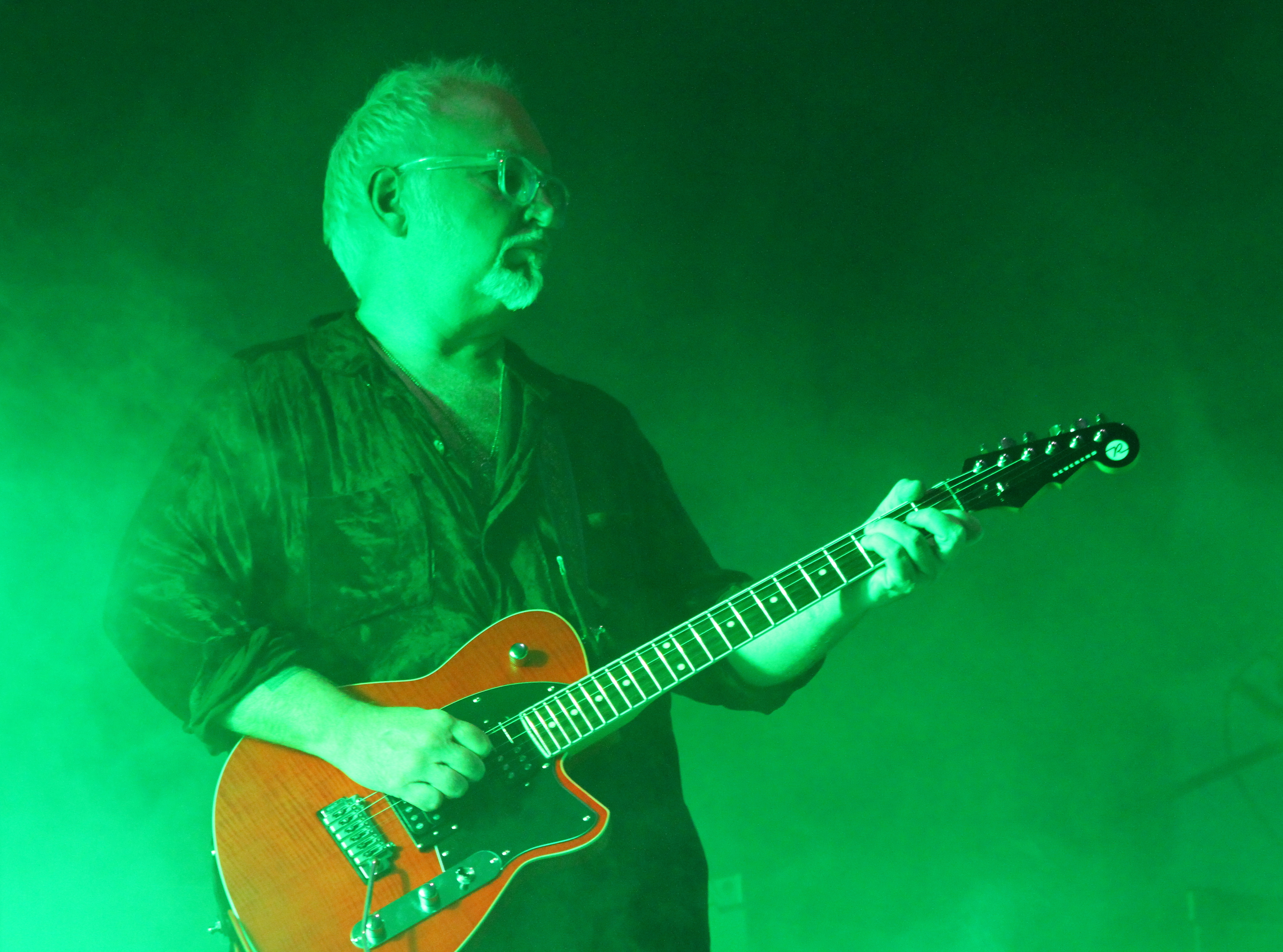
Guitarist Reeves Gabrels (pictured in 2012) was one of Bowie's primary collaborators for Earthling.

David Bowie supported his 20th studio album Outside on the Outside Tour, which ran from September 1995 to February 1996. The lineup for the tour included Reeves Gabrels (guitars), Mike Garson (piano), Zack Alford (drums), Gail Ann Dorsey (bass), Carlos Alomar (rhythm guitar), George Simms (vocals) and Pete Schwartz (keyboards). A few months after the tour's conclusion, Bowie and the band—minus Simms, Schwartz and Alomar—played a series of festivals during the summer from June to July 1996.

Bowie's positive relationship with the stripped-down lineup was the springboard for his next studio record. He told Alan Yentob in 1996: "They're probably the most enjoyable set of musicians I've worked with. It's the greatest fun and satisfaction I've had with a band since the Spiders." (Note: The Spiders from Mars were Bowie's backing band from 1971 to 1973.) Gabrels later told the biographer Paul Trynka:

That summer was the end of Outside and [the] beginning of Earthling. I had written about six tracks, more like electronic stuff, on my laptop. I was trying to write without guitar at that point because we'd been crossing paths with bands like Underworld and [the] Prodigy.

In April 1996, Bowie began recording a new track, "Telling Lies", alone at Mountain Studios in Montreux, Switzerland; it was the last time he worked at Mountain. The song, which expanded on the jungle and drum and bass rhythms found on the Outside tracks "I'm Deranged" and "We Prick You", made its debut at the summer shows. Speaking with Mojo magazine in March 1997, Bowie stated: "[I] used it as a blueprint of where I wanted the Earthling album to go ... We just kept re-moulding it throughout the tour." Also recorded around May was an untitled piece containing the lyric "dead men don't talk" that, like "Telling Lies", pre-dated the Earthling material.

=== Initial sessions ===
There was no aforethought. It was very immediate, very spontaneous, and it virtually put itself together. Writing and recording, two and a half weeks, and then a couple of weeks of mixing ... it was really very fast.

— David Bowie on the recording process for Earthling

Recording for Earthling began in August 1996 shortly after the conclusion of the festival dates. For the location, Bowie chose the composer Philip Glass's Looking Glass Studios in New York City. (Note: Glass had recently adapted Bowie's 1977 albums Low and "Heroes" into classical music symphonies, titled "Low" Symphony and "Heroes" Symphony, respectively.) Joining the lineup was the engineer Mark Plati, a New York native who had extensive experience at Looking Glass. Bowie himself mostly self-produced, making it his first self-produced record since Diamond Dogs (1974). He explained: "I knew exactly what I wanted. We didn't have any time to pull in a co-producer ... so I just sort of went for it." Plati and Gabrels were both credited as co-producers, while the former co-wrote several tracks.

Bowie and Gabrels commenced work on Earthling with Plati using demos the two had made on the road. The album was recorded entirely on hard disk, allowing instruments and vocals to be cut and pasted at random. While Bowie focused on crafting the lyrics, using an improved version of the cut-up computer program used for Outside, Gabrels and Plati focused on the music. Plati recalled: "We were cranking [songs] out one per day. Reeves would be coming up with guitar parts and sounds, I'd be at the computer recording him or working on the arrangement, and David would be on the couch, writing the lyric. At day's end, he'd do a vocal." According to Bowie, the trio did not focus on crafting melodies, instead tinkering with the recordings to see which combinations worked and which did not: "Once we developed a kind of mattress, then I would go into the studio and just free-associate against that." Plati was impressed with Bowie's work ethic and recalled that most of his vocal tracks were done in one take. While the sessions were still underway, the band performed four shows on the US East Coast in September 1996, where they premiered "Little Wonder" and "Seven Years in Tibet".

=== Overdubs ===
The latter half of the sessions focused on overdubs by Garson, Dorsey and Alford. Their contributions were manipulated through various studio effects, such as sampling, looping and distorting; according to the biographer Chris O'Leary, Alford is heard more through sped-up loops rather than live tracks. Gabrels also utilised a Roland processor on his guitar which allowed for digital manipulation and alteration. He and Bowie used a technique they previously utilised for Outside: transferring bits of guitar to a sampling keyboard and constructing riffs from those pieces. Bowie stated: "It's real guitar, but constructed in a synthetic way. But Brian Eno got in the way – in the nicest possible way – so we didn't get to that until this album." Garson was not a fan of the material initially, as he was forced to work with set structures compared to his mostly improvisational role on Outside. For the drum tracks, Alford began by working on his own snare patterns at 120 beats per minute (bpm) which were then sped up to 160 bpm, and afterwards improvised on a real kit against the sampled patterns. Bowie's primary goal during the sessions was to combine elements of the "technological" and "organic": "That's very much how we treat the album. We kept all sampling in-house and created our own soundscape in a way."

Unlike Outside, the majority of the tracks were written and recorded quickly, with the entire album recorded in about two and a half weeks; Bowie at one point stated it was recorded in eight days. (Note: According to biographer Nicholas Pegg, recording lasted through October.) In addition to revamped versions of "Telling Lies" and the Outside outtake "I'm Afraid of Americans", seven new tracks appeared on the final album. Outtakes from the sessions included remakes of the Tin Machine tracks "Baby Universal", which was played on stage earlier in the year, and "I Can't Read", which was replaced by "The Last Thing You Should Do". (Note: "I Can't Read" appeared on the soundtrack for the 1997 film The Ice Storm, while both remakes later appeared on the Is It Any Wonder? EP in 2020.) According to O'Leary, Earthling was initially envisioned as an EP of new tracks sequenced with the remakes and covers, but by the end of the sessions, there was enough material for a full-length album of new content. (Note: Also attempted during the sessions were remakes of The Buddha of Suburbia track "Dead Against It" (1993) and "Bring Me the Disco King", a track attempted during the sessions for Black Tie White Noise (1993) and later properly recorded and released on Reality (2003).)

== Music and lyrics ==
We came into the studio specifically with the idea of trying to juxtopose all the dance styles that we'd been working with live. Jungle, aggressive rock and industrial.

— David Bowie on the album's sound

Compared to the nineteen pieces found on Outside, Earthling contains only nine tracks. Additionally, Bowie stated that he found Earthling "primitive" in contrast to the complexity of its predecessor. Musically, the album showcases an electronica-influenced sound partly inspired by the industrial and drum and bass culture of the 1990s. Bowie had previously explored these styles on Outside, but fully embraced them for Earthling. In a contemporary interview, Bowie said that "I thought that what we should do was develop our vocabulary of dance forms, but incorporate rock." He compared the process to his Young Americans album (1975), which combined his European musical background with black soul styles. While reviewers generally consider Earthling Bowie's "drum and bass album", the biographer Marc Spitz argues that "it's simply [a] case of a veteran artist pursuing a sound with which he or she has fallen in love." Buckley agrees, further noting that only three or four tracks contain a drum and bass element. Plati later contested:

To this day, I occasionally see Earthling derided in the press as David's 'jungle' record or 'drum and bass experiment'. People are entitled to their opinions, but I do disagree. It's a Bowie record. The drum and bass sound just went through the Bowie filter, like any other Bowie album. When he coopted soul in the seventies, he didn't get that sort of grief—he was rightfully called an innovator.

Characterised by "rapid-fire bass, hailstorm percussion, flashes of distorted guitar, sampling [and] sudden dramatic pauses", drum and bass rhythms dominate "Little Wonder", "Battle for Britain (The Letter)", "Telling Lies" and "Dead Man Walking". Other reviewers have noted the presence of industrial rock, electronica, hard rock and alternative dance. The author James E. Perone found an emphasis on techno and jungle and deems Earthling more musically accessible than its predecessor, partially aided by "strong melodic hooks" throughout. Bowie initially compared the album's aggressive sound to 1980's Scary Monsters (and Super Creeps). Lyrically, Perone describes the album's overall theme as alienation, while Nicholas Pegg says that the lyrics revisit the spiritual themes previously found on Station to Station (1976), a claim supported by Bowie himself.

=== Songs ===
"Little Wonder" was one of the first tracks Bowie and Gabrels wrote for the album. Bowie called writing the track a "ridiculous" exercise in pure stream of consciousness: "I just picked Snow White and the Seven Dwarves and made a line for each of the dwarves' names. And that's the song [laughs]. And then I ran out of dwarves' names, so there's new dwarves in it like 'Stinky'." Originally set to be a "nine-minute jungle electronic epic", the song was trimmed to six minutes for the album. Described by O'Leary as a combination of arena rock and electronica, it utilises percussion and power chords from the Prodigy's "Firestarter", a 1996 UK number one that assisted in bringing drum and bass rhythms to the mainstream.

"Looking for Satellites" was the second track recorded for the album. In an interview with Mojo, Bowie described the track as "A straight, rational piece about where we find ourselves at this particular point in this era: somewhere between religion and technology, and not quite sure where to go next. It's kind of a poignant feeling, standing alone on a beach at night looking for a satellite ... but what you're really looking for is an answer." It features various cut-up lyrics that were influenced by the then-recent discovery of the possibility of life on Mars. Bowie considered the lyrics "measuring the distance between the crucifixion and flying saucers". The atmosphere is said by Pegg to contain "wistful uncertainty". Gabrels' guitar solo, pieced together from multiple takes, was added in the last minute at Bowie's insistence.

According to Plati, "Battle for Britain (The Letter)" was an "attempt to do a jazz-tinged jungle track". He believed the song brought focus to the album, wherein the structures would resemble "actual songs [instead of] intense atmospheres". Characterised by various loops and distortion, the lyrics discuss Bowie's uncertainty about his own British identity, as he had not lived in the UK for two decades. The music combines techno and the alternative rock of Tin Machine, with vocal melodies and harmonies reminiscent of, in Perone's words, "a 1966 or 1967 British rock band". For the piano solo, Bowie challenged Garson to play a part based on an Igor Stravinsky piece, which he interpreted after hearing it played on a CD.

Inspired by Heinrich Harrer's autobiography of the same name, the lyrics of "Seven Years in Tibet" reflect the Chinese takeover of Tibet. It began as a Gabrels' composition titled "Brussels" and was almost scrapped by Bowie before Gabrels intervened; Bowie later described it as his favourite track on the album. Musically, the song presents a mix of genres such as new wave, grunge and R&B. According to Pegg, it is characterised by saxophone riffs, shrieking guitars, various loops and treated vocals and synthesisers.

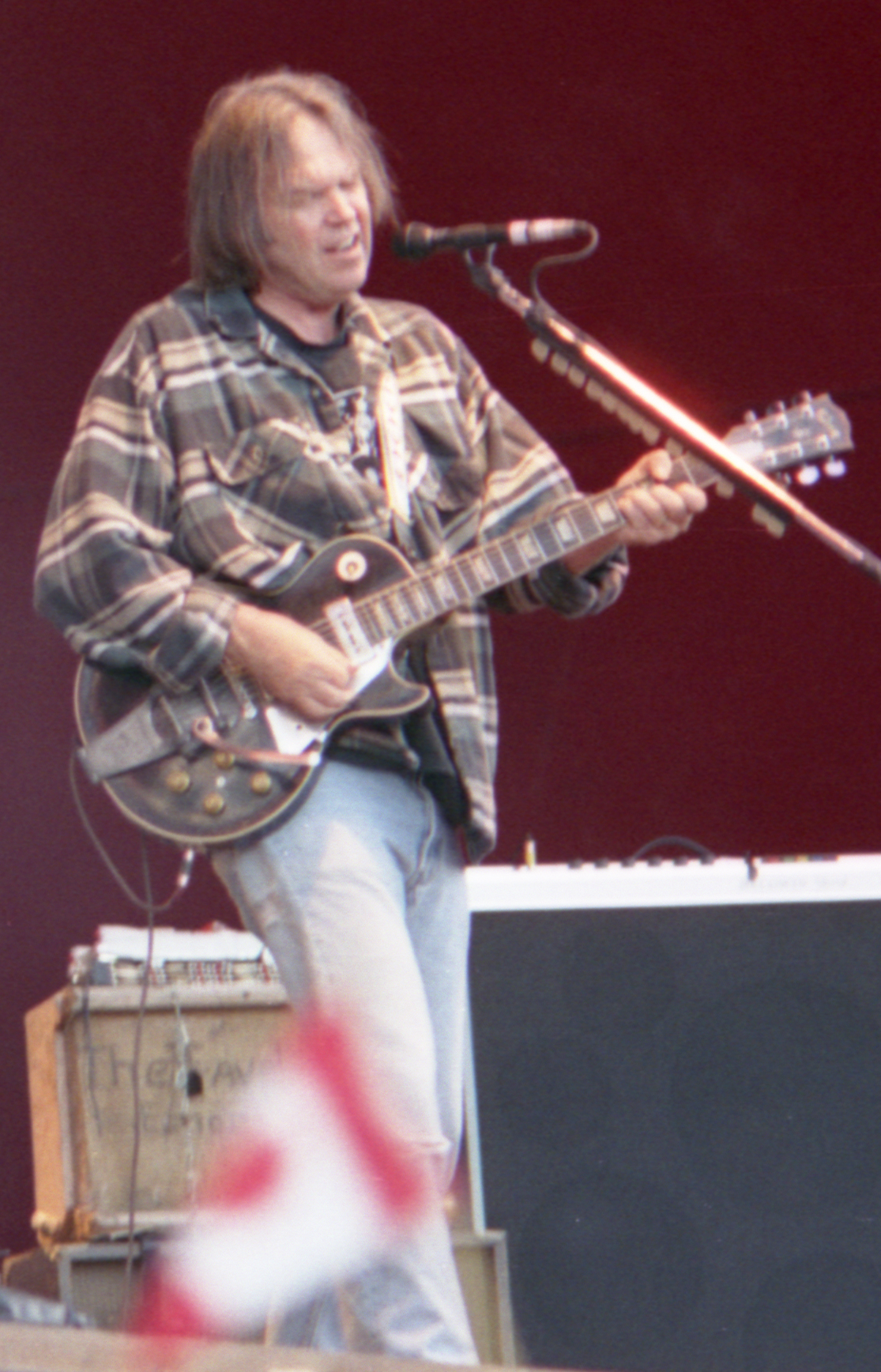
Neil Young (pictured in 1996) influenced the lyrics of "Dead Man Walking" after Bowie performed at a pair of benefit concerts for the artist in October 1996.

Bowie described "Dead Man Walking" as his homage "to rock and roll that is still young while we are all growing old". As such, the lyrics reflect his thoughts on aging at this point in his career. It initially began as a tribute to the actress Susan Sarandon, (Note: Bowie and Sarandon had co-starred in the 1983 film The Hunger together, while Sarandon later won an Oscar for her role in the 1995 film Dead Man Walking, which has no direct connection to Bowie's track.) but took additional influences from songwriter Neil Young after Bowie, Gabrels and Dorsey performed at a pair of benefit concerts for the artist in October 1996. The music is, in Perone's words, "largely conventional dance", featuring atonal piano, sequenced keyboards and electric guitar and containing elements of Latin dance music and jazz; Pegg describes the song as "modern rock". According to Plati, the song took five days to mix: "It [began] completely programmed and by the time it's finished it's completely live."

"Telling Lies" originated during the Outside sessions. While Bowie recorded most of the track alone in April, he polished the lyrics during the actual sessions, while the band added overdubs. Both the music and lyrics represent a hybridisation of the Outside and Earthling styles, with Pegg describing the final arrangement as a blend of "a very aggressive rock sound with drum and bass". Perone finds a mix of dance and alternative rock styles that is less successful than other Earthling tracks. The lyrics also feature more rhyme than other tracks, delving into topics such as gossip, exaggerations and lying. On 11 September 1996, Plati's "Feelgood Mix" of the song was released on the internet, reportedly receiving 250,000 downloads. With this release, Bowie became the first artist to release a downloadable track through the internet. Additional remixes by A Guy Called Gerald (the "Paradox Mix") and Adam F were released the same month.

"The Last Thing You Should Do" was one of the final tracks recorded for the album, primarily built using, in O'Leary's words, "discarded overdub bits". Gabrels insisted on including it on the album over the Tin Machine remakes, explaining: "Because I co-wrote both of those T.M. songs, that meant I could stand on the higher moral ground, as I was fighting against my own offspring." He argued that the track turned Earthling "from a ten-song album pastiche ... to a nine-song cohesive statement". The music is primarily jungle with bits of techno, while the lyrics discuss the lack of humour and self-love in the late 20th-century. Bowie himself compared the song's music to "Sound and Vision" from his 1977 album Low. O'Leary considers it a "miniature" version of the remaining tracks and, in the context of the entire album, Perone argues the song is more successful as a standalone track.

"I'm Afraid of Americans" was originally recorded during the Outside sessions as "Dummy", featuring different lyrics; this version was released on the soundtrack for the 1995 film Showgirls. Bowie stated: "That was something that Eno and I put together, and I just didn't feel it fit Outside, so it didn't go on it. It just got left behind. So then we took just the embryo of it, and restructured it with this band." Described by Bowie as "one of those stereotypical 'Johnny' songs: Johnny does this, Johnny does that", the Earthling version contains revised lyrics, additional overdubs from the band and transposed verses. Plati explained: "We pulled things off several different reels to make this new composite. It as quite a clean-up job, not the most enjoyable." Musically, the song mixes techno styles of the 1980s and 1990s while lyrically, it presents a critique of America, in line with Bowie's 1975 track "Young Americans".

"Law (Earthlings on Fire)" was the first track recorded during the sessions. Musically, the song is unlike jungle and more, in O'Leary's words, "industrial trash-pop". Pegg describes it as a club track reminiscent of the Black Tie White Noise track "Pallas Athena" (1993), featuring various synthesiser effects with a dance-style bassline; Plati compared it to a sound collage. The lyrics convey existential concerns, using obscure references such as a quote from polymath Bertrand Russell. Pegg considers it the album's weakest track, while Perone believes it works best as commentary on the "end-of-the-millenium sense of malaise" rather than as a standalone Bowie track.

== Title and packaging ==
The album title was chosen by fans at a performance in Roseland, New York, during the September 1996 tour; Bowie asked the audience if the upcoming album should be titled 'Earthling' or 'Earthlings'. Bowie stated that "it was supposed to describe the Earth; man and his pure habitat on Earth. And I suppose the irony isn't lost on me that it's sort of me in maybe my most worldly kind of human guise to date."

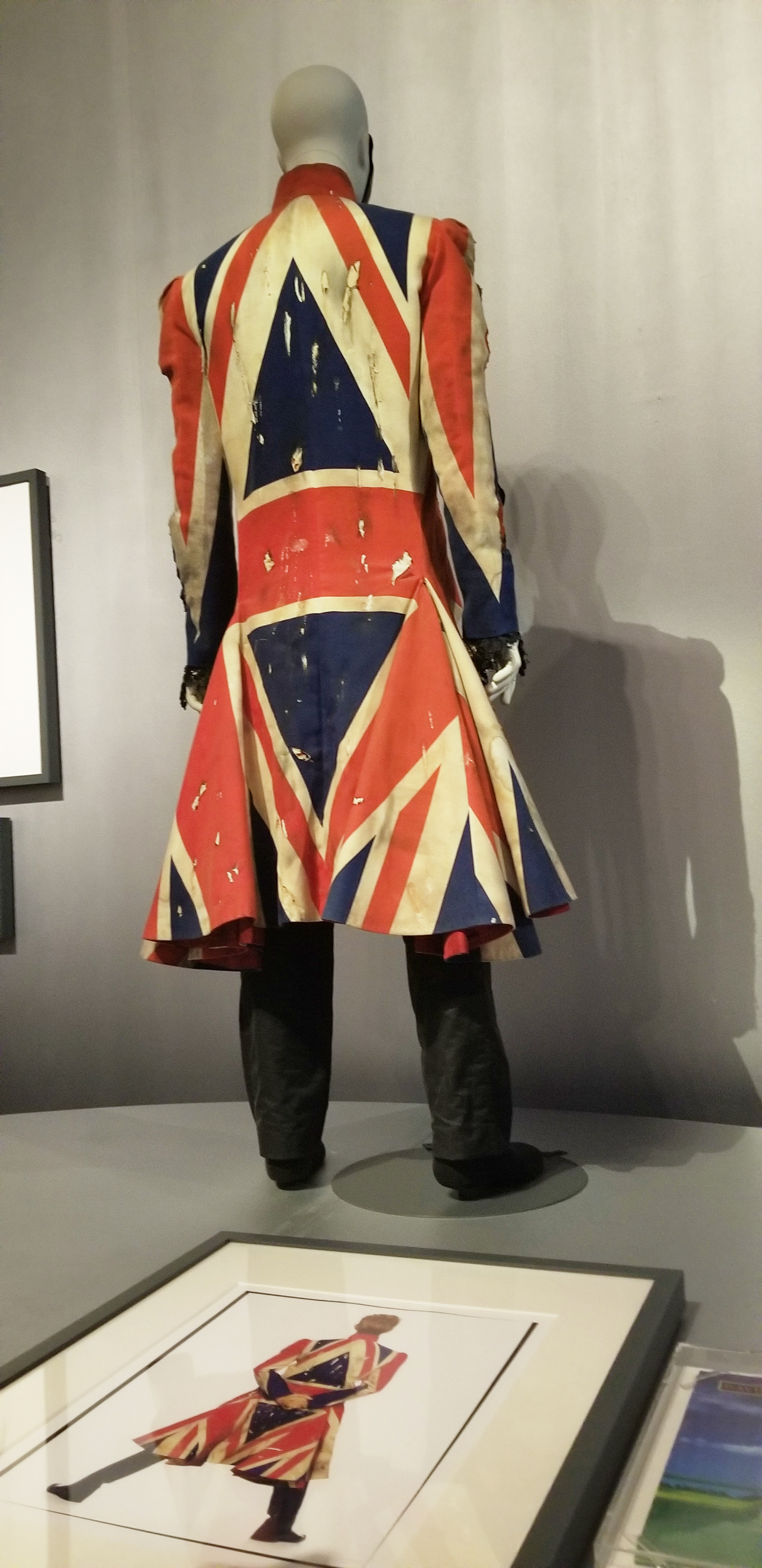
The Union Jack coat on display at the David Bowie Is exhibition in 2018.

The artwork was first conceptualised during the sessions. Bowie wears a tattered Union Jack coat with hands behind his back. Bowie looks out towards the green plains of England. The photograph was taken by Frank Ockenfels in New York. Computer designer Dave De Angelis in England created the final cover. The idea for the coat originated from Gavin Turk's 1995 exhibit Indoor Flag. The coat, which Bowie wore for the summer festivals, the Earthling cover and later the VH1 Fashion Awards in 1997, was co-designed by Bowie and Alexander McQueen. Bowie explained: "[It's] the ultimate anti-icon. A retelling of the British flag joke, again torn and stained ... the tatty remains of a metaphysical empire." Pegg compares Bowie's stance to the Colossus of Rhodes, a "proud eighteenth-century landowner in a Gainsborough portrait", and an alien visitor as in the sleeve for Ziggy Stardust (1972). According to Gabrels, Bowie's intention for the cover was to realign himself with England.

The Union Jack's appearance on the cover has generated commentary from Bowie's biographers. Buckley writes that over the past thirty years in Britain, the Union Jack had symbolised confidence in the 1960s, oppression in the 1970s through the punk rock movement, and "rightist" through Morrissey's controversial use of it at Finsbury Park in the early 1990s. Pegg notes that the 1990s Britpop era saw the use of the Union Jack in advertisements, while numerous bands at the time posed with the flag for both Melody Maker and NME. Following Earthling's release, the Union Jack became fashionable and was worn by artists including Eurythmics and the Spice Girls.

The Earthling CD package was presented with an elaborate, electronically manipulated photo collage of Bowie and the band members. Additional images included with the sleeve dated back to Bowie's Los Angeles period in the mid-1970s, such as a blurred flying saucer and a Kirlian photograph of his fingertip and crucifix, which also appeared on the "Little Wonder" CD single. Pegg attributes Bowie's desire for the photographs to his cocaine addiction.

== Release and promotion ==
Earthling was preceded by the release of two singles. The first, "Telling Lies" backed by three remixes, was released on 4 November 1996. It peaked at number 76 and 79 in Britain and Scotland, respectively, although its distribution was limited to 3,500 copies. The second, "Little Wonder" backed by three remixes, was issued on 27 January 1997. The single was a success, peaking at number 14 in the UK and topping the chart in Japan. The accompanying music video was directed by Floria Sigismondi and depicts Bowie at three different ages. Buckley considers it a dance-oriented video rather than a rock one, reminiscent of Orbital's "The Box" (1996).

Earthling was released on 3 February 1997 on CD and LP formats through RCA Records in the UK, Virgin Records in the US, and Arista Records and its parent distributor BMG elsewhere. The Japanese CD included the 'Adam F Mix' of "Telling Lies" as a bonus track. RCA stressed the album's accessibility in their marketing campaign; marketing director Kristina Kyriacou said: "It's a lot more commercial than [Bowie's] recent albums and we believe that it has a great deal of longevity. Earthling is a very dynamic, bold statement and we aim to reflect that." The album sold modestly, but performed better than its predecessor, reaching number six on the UK Albums Chart and number 39 on the US Billboard 200. It also reached number five in Belgian Wallonia and Sweden, and the top ten in France and Scotland. It was nominated for Best Alternative Music Performance at the 40th Annual Grammy Awards in 1998, losing to Radiohead's OK Computer (1997). Bowie promoted Earthling with a string of television appearances from February to April 1997, including on Saturday Night Live and The Tonight Show with Jay Leno.

Three more singles followed the album's release. "Dead Man Walking" appeared on 14 April 1997 on various single formats, some backed by remixes of the track and others featuring remixes of Outside tracks. One remix was done by musician Moby, which marked the beginning of Bowie's association with the artist. Its music video, again directed by Sigismondi, expanded on the themes of the "Little Wonder" video, featuring appearances from Bowie and Dorsey and, in Pegg's words, "flailing choreography". The band mimed the song on Top of the Pops on 25 April. The single was nominated for the Grammy Award for Best Male Rock Vocal Performance, losing to Bob Dylan's "Cold Irons Bound" (1997). "Seven Years in Tibet" was released on 18 August, backed by a Mandarin version of the song, with lyrics translated by Lin Xi. It failed to reach the UK top 50.

"I'm Afraid of Americans" was issued in the US only on 14 October 1997 as a maxi-single, where it was backed by six remixes, some of which featured Ice Cube and Photek. The project was instigated by Nine Inch Nails frontman Trent Reznor, continuing his and Bowie's association following the Outside Tour. Reznor, who said he "tried to make it a bit darker", stripped the production to its roots to create what Buckley calls "an eerie, psychotic track". Reznor also starred as the titular 'Johnny' in the Dom and Nic-directed music video, which reflected the song's theme of a frightened European in an American city and gave Bowie a nomination for Best Male Video at the 1998 MTV Video Music Awards. The single reached number 66 on the Billboard Hot 100 and remained on the chart for 16 weeks, becoming Bowie's biggest hit in the country since "Day-In Day-Out" ten years earlier. It also stayed in the Canadian top 50 for six months.

== Critical reception ==
Professional ratings
Initial reviews (in 1997)
Review scores
Source	Rating
Chicago Tribune	2.5/4 stars
Entertainment Weekly	A
The Guardian	3/4 stars
NME	6/10
Pitchfork	8.0/10
The Philadelphia Inquirer	3/4 stars
Q	4/5 stars
Rolling Stone	3.5/5 stars
Select	1/5 stars
Spin	6/10

Earthling received largely positive reviews from music critics on release. Some considered it an improvement over its predecessor. Linda Laban of The Seattle Times found it a "richly textured return to excellence", while, in the words of Chicago Tribune's Greg Kot, it represented "some of [Bowie's] finest music in a decade". Mark Kemp of Rolling Stone considered the album Bowie's best since Scary Monsters, although he felt the music lacked innovation. Steve Malins of Q magazine similarly found Earthling "shot through with a gnarly atmospheric chill not encountered since Scary Monsters". Multiple reviewers praised the musical experimentation. A writer for Billboard called Earthling Bowie's "most inspired, most cutting-edge, and most promising effort since Let's Dance [1983]". They predicted it would have great chart and Internet success and ultimately considered it "a work of infinite possibilities". Peter Aspden of the Financial Times positively compared Earthling to the Prodigy and the Chemical Brothers' concurrent releases The Fat of the Land and Dig Your Own Hole, respectively, stating that they "were strong on aggression and aural attack, but lacked the variety and subtlety to last beyond twenty-odd interesting minutes".

Andy Gill of The Independent praised the music as innovative compared to other jungle and drum and bass acts of the time, stating: "What comes through most strongly on Earthling is the way Bowie retains an obsessional interest in the sheer variety and extremity of sound." He further highlighted Gabrels' and Garson's contributions on "Looking for Satellites" and "Battle for Britain", respectively. Gill commended Bowie for "offering refined mainstream applications of cutting-edge experimentation" in Mojo. In People, Peter Castro credited Bowie with striking an "accessible" balance between the "jungle" and rock style akin to Lodger (1979) and Scary Monsters. Dan Deluca of The Philadelphia Inquirer similarly wrote that the record succeeded in blending the electronic beats and rhythms with live instrumentation. He ultimately considered it "nervy and energetic" and Bowie's finest album "in a diamond dog's age". Nevertheless, he felt that Bowie was "jumping on the electronica bandwagon". Jason Josephes of Pitchfork considered it an artistic rebirth for the artist with a predominately "classic Bowie" style.

Other reviewers expressed more mixed assessments. Writing for The Guardian, Caroline Sullivan concluded that the majority of the tracks lacked cohesiveness to elevate the album as one of Bowie's classics. In NME, Jazz Mulvey found Earthling more rushed than Outside and found the project clumsy and pretentious overall, and felt that Bowie, once at the cutting edge of musical innovation, was now trying to keep up. Although he welcomed it as another addition to Bowie's catalogue, he concluded: "It's not the future, but it's pretty fine." In a more negative evaluation, Carol Clerk and Andre Paine, writers of Melody Maker, included Earthling on their list of Bowie albums "best to avoid". In a particularly scathing review, Select's Ian Harrison wrote: "Earthling is splendidly coiffured and presented...but the selling point – Bowie goes original junglist nutty – is so negligible as to be non-existent. And what remains is not good." Robert Christgau, in The Village Voice, gave the album a "dud" grade.

== Tour ==
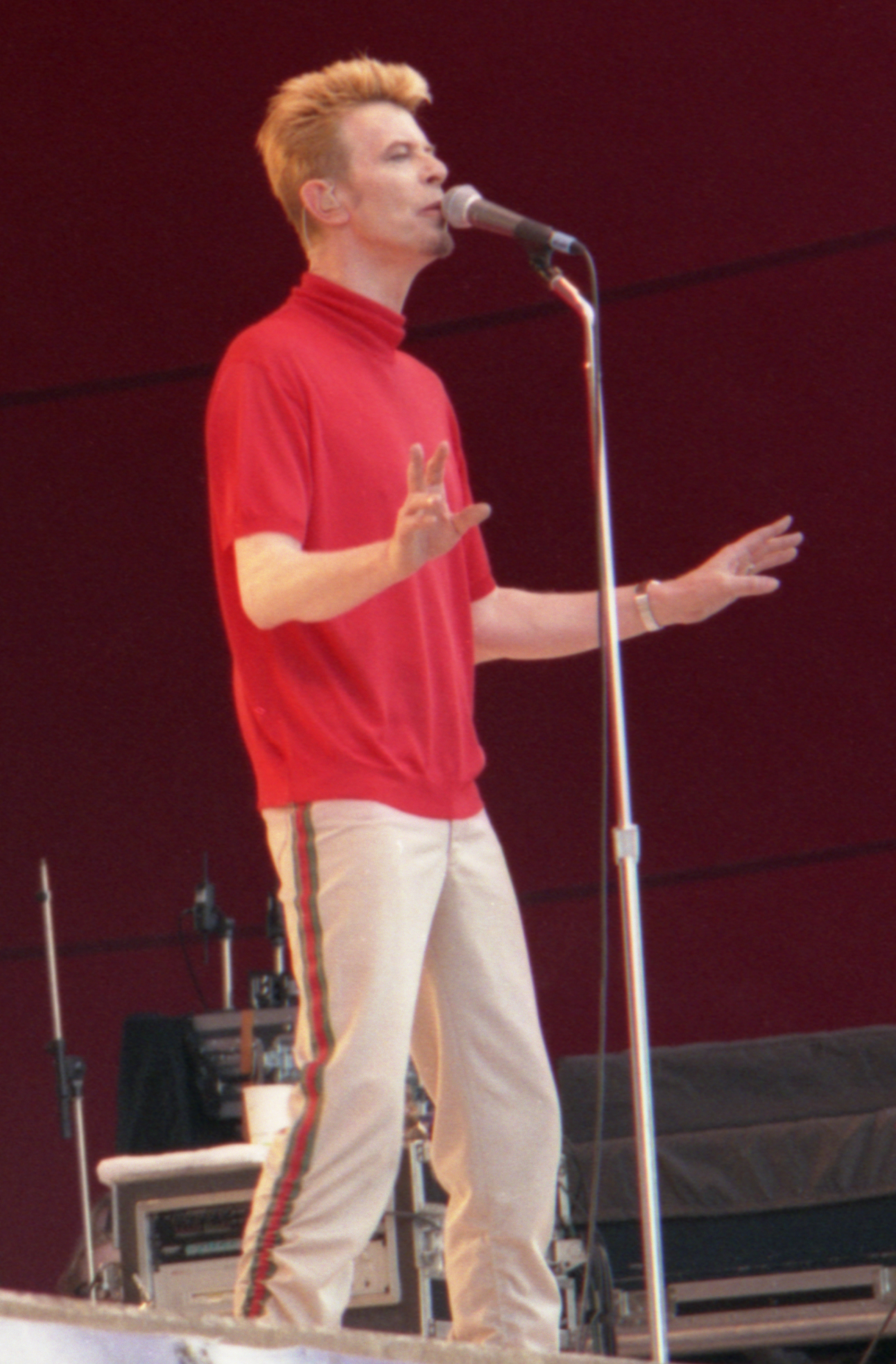
Bowie performing in Finland in June 1997

Rehearsals for the Earthling Tour began in mid-April 1997. The band was composed of Bowie, Gabrels, Dorsey, Alford and Garson. When asked by Q about his thoughts regarding touring, Bowie stated: "Honestly, it would be a sin not playing live when I've got a band like this. They're the best group I've had in twenty years, right up there with the Spiders in terms of cohesive musicianship and attitude." After performing two shows at the Hanover Grand in London in early June, the tour commenced on 7 June and concluded on 7 November 1997.

Pegg says the shows were "less stagey" than the Outside Tour, although elaborate light shows, costume designs and visual aids were present. The setlist throughout the tour included more well-known hits than its predecessor, while all tracks from Earthling except "Law (Earthlings on Fire)" were performed. Initially, the tracks were split into conventional "rock" and "drum and bass" sets. Later on, they were interspersed throughout the setlists. British reviewers, such as Melody Maker and NME, praised the shows in general but were initially critical of the Earthling material, although the latter reversed its opinion by July. Chris Roberts of Uncut magazine praised Bowie's presence on stage, although he criticised the show's second half.

In July, the band appeared at the Phoenix Festival where they played as "Tao Jones Index" in the Radio 1 Dance tent. They later released remixed versions of "Pallas Athena" and the "Heroes" track "V-2 Schneider" (1977) as a single under the name in August. At the festival, Bowie approached electronic duo Orbital for a possible collaboration, although this never came to fruition; member Phil Hartnoll later considered it "the biggest disappointment of [his] career". The Phoenix Festival performance was later released as a live album in 2021 titled Look at the Moon! (Live Phoenix Festival 97), as part of the series Brilliant Live Adventures (2020–2021).

Changes were made to the setlist for the tour's American leg, which began in August. The band primarily played at small clubs rather than large venues for commercial reasons, according to Buckley. Performances during the leg were broadcast on various television stations throughout the rest of the year. Additionally, live performances from the entire year and other tracks were compiled for Earthling in the City (1997), a six-track promotional CD that was included with the November 1997 American issue of GQ magazine. While Bowie planned to release a live album from the tour, the idea was vetoed by Virgin. Tracks from the project were later released in 1999 to BowieNet subscribers as LiveAndWell.com, which was officially issued in 2021 as part of the Brilliant Live Adventures series.

== Aftermath and legacy ==
Throughout 1997, Bowie garnered attention when he earned substantial wealth through the sale of "Bowie Bonds", a celebrity bond that was issued against Bowie's future royalties from his back catalogue over the next ten years. Bowie was the first rock musician to engage in such a deal, predating future endeavors by artists such as Elton John, and it earned him $55 million. He also earned an additional $28.5 million upon selling his back catalogue to EMI, who subsequently began a Best of... reissue campaign. In November 1997, Bowie performed on the BBC's Children in Need charity single "Perfect Day 97", which became a UK number-one single. In 1998, Bowie retreated from the spotlight; nevertheless, he continued recording and making film appearances. He also reconciled with his former collaborator Tony Visconti. In late 1998, Bowie and Gabrels spent time in Bermuda, composing tracks for his next album Hours (1999).

In 2018, Gabrels considered Earthling his favourite collaboration with Bowie, telling Classic Rock magazine: "We did have a sense while we were doing it that we were making something we hadn't heard." Other artists have spoken positively of the record. Robert Smith later stated: "I really liked Earthling. I thought it was a really good album. The songs are great songs. They really stand up to be listened to AS songs and the fact that he worked in a particular genre and tried to capture a certain sound is neither here nor there. The songs are really well put together." Mark Guiliana cited Alford's drum work on Earthling as the primary inspiration for his drum patterns on Bowie's final album Blackstar (2016).

=== Retrospective appraisal ===
Professional ratings
Retrospective reviews (after 1997)
Review scores
Source	Rating
AllMusic	2.5/5 stars
The Encyclopedia of Popular Music	2/5 stars
The Great Rock Discography	6/10
Pitchfork	8.5/10
The Rolling Stone Album Guide	2.5/5 stars
Uncut	7/10

Retrospective reviews of Earthling have been mixed. AllMusic editor Stephen Thomas Erlewine criticised the album's sound as "awkward", writing that "the record frequently sounds as if the beats were simply grafted on top of pre-existing songs". He further called the songs formulaic and the album itself as ultimately underwhelming. John Davidson of PopMatters wrote that Earthling was the result of Bowie trying to "play catch-up" with the drum and bass explosion of the late 1990s. He called the lyrics Bowie's "most obtuse" and, like Erlewine, believed that the drum beats were built around the songs instead of for them. Davidson ultimately states: "Earthling is essentially a conventional Bowie rock album (if such a thing be), dressed in baggy dance garb." The Independent's Ed Power considered the album a part of the "most underrated phase" of Bowie's career and worth a reevaluation among fans.

In Pitchfork, Sean T. Collins, positively compared Earthling to Young Americans (1975) and Let's Dance, calling the record a "muscular collection" that "deserves a place in the pantheon alongside its predecessors." Uncut placed the album 386th in their list of "The 500 Greatest Albums of the 1990s", noting how Bowie remained an "experimental force" and stating that "Earthling's industrial, drum-and-bass experiments have aged well."

In lists ranking Bowie's studio albums from worst to best, Earthling has placed in the middle to low tier. Stereogum placed it at number 17 (out of 25 at the time) in 2013. Aaron Lariviere stated: "Earthling is nowhere near Bowie's best, but it's a treat to see the old dog show his teeth after all these years." Three years later, Bryan Wawzenek of Ultimate Classic Rock placed Earthling at number 18 out of 26, criticised its emphasis on "sounds over songs" and, like Davidson, found "Bowie being late to yet another sub-genre party". Nevertheless, he highlighted Bowie's energetic performance and the "great soundscapes" on "Seven Years in Tibet" and "I'm Afraid of Americans". The writers of Consequence of Sound ranked Earthling number 22 in their 2018 list.

Bowie's biographers have given Earthling mixed assessments. Pegg and Spitz argue that, despite being recorded in America and with American musicians, Earthling was Bowie's most "British" release in twenty years. While Buckley considers it a "hard-hitting and single-minded album" and Christopher Sandford says that there is a lack of innovation but states that "it was a creditable enough bid for relevance by any fifty-year-old." He also calls "Little Wonder" Bowie's "most exciting and upbeat single since 'Blue Jean' [1984]". Perone finds confusing themes throughout and opinions that the fusion of different musical styles are not always successful. O'Leary primarily criticises the production, particularly on "Little Wonder", as sounding dated within a couple of years. On the other hand, Trynka praises "Little Wonder" but criticises the album's repetitive nature. He concludes: "The album as a whole is conservative and formulaic. [...] Those faults would have been forgivable had the album been released two years earlier; its appearance just as the nineties drum and bass craze was subsiding suggested Bowie was content to surf on someone else's wave rather than make his own." Reviewing more positively, Pegg writes that its "furious broadside" makes Earthling a "very fine album". He calls it and its predecessor "essential purchases" of Bowie's "most underrated decade".

=== Reissues ===
In 2003, Columbia Records reissued Earthling on CD, with another reissue following a year later that contained bonus tracks, including 13 remixes, B-sides, alternate takes and live performances from the Earthling Tour. In 2021, the album was remastered and included as part of the box set Brilliant Adventure (1992–2001).

== Track listing ==
All lyrics are written by David Bowie; all music is composed by Bowie, Reeves Gabrels and Mark Plati, except where noted.

Earthling track listing
No.	Title	Music	Length
1.	"Little Wonder"		6:02
2.	"Looking for Satellites"		5:21
3.	"Battle for Britain (The Letter)"		4:48
4.	"Seven Years in Tibet"	Bowie; Gabrels	6:22
5.	"Dead Man Walking"	Bowie; Gabrels	6:50
6.	"Telling Lies"	Bowie	4:49
7.	"The Last Thing You Should Do"		4:57
8.	"I'm Afraid of Americans"	Bowie; Brian Eno	5:00
9.	"Law (Earthlings on Fire)"	Bowie; Gabrels	4:48
Total length:			48:57

== Personnel ==
According to the liner notes and the biographer Nicholas Pegg.

- David Bowie – vocals; guitar; alto saxophone; samples; keyboards
- Reeves Gabrels – programming; synthesisers; real and sampled guitars; vocals
- Mark Plati – programming; loops; samples; keyboards
- Gail Ann Dorsey – bass guitar; vocals
- Zack Alford – drum loops; acoustic drums; electronic percussion
- Mike Garson – keyboards; piano

Production

- David Bowie – producer
- Reeves Gabrels – producer
- Mark Plati – producer; engineer; mixing
- Bob Ludwig – mastering engineer

== Charts ==
=== Weekly charts ===
1997 weekly chart performance for Earthling
Chart (1997)	Peak Position
Australian Albums (ARIA)	45
Austrian Albums (Ö3 Austria)	15
Belgian Albums (Flanders)	13
Belgian Albums (Wallonia)	5
Canadian Albums (RPM)	21
Danish Albums (Hitlisten)	18
Dutch Albums (MegaCharts)	19
Finnish Albums	12
French Albums (SNEP)	9
German Albums (Media Control)	11
Italian Albums (Musica e dischi)	8
Japanese Albums (Oricon)	20
New Zealand Albums (RIANZ)	15
Norwegian Albums (VG-lista)	13
Scottish Albums (Official Charts)	9
Spanish Albums (Promusicae)	40
Swedish Albums (Sverigetopplistan)	5
Swiss Albums	20
UK Albums (Official Charts)	6
US Billboard 200	39

=== Year-end charts ===
1997 year-end chart performance for Earthling
Chart (1997)	Position
Belgian Albums (Ultratop)	100

== Certifications and sales ==
Certifications and sales for Earthling
Region	Certification	Certified units/sales
Japan (RIAJ)	Gold	100,000^{^}
United Kingdom (BPI) 2003 release	Silver	60,000^{^}
Summaries
Worldwide	—	1,000,000
^{^} Shipments figures based on certification alone.
