= Pallas Athena (song) =

1997 David Bowie single

Song by David Bowie

from the album Black Tie White Noise
- Released: 5 April 1993
- Recorded: 1992
- Genre: House
- Length: 4:40
- Label: Savage
- Songwriter(s): David Bowie
- Producer(s): David Bowie; Nile Rodgers

"Pallas Athena"

Single by David Bowie as Tao Jones Index
- B-side: "V-2 Schneider" (live)
- Released: 26 August 1997
- Recorded: Paradiso, Amsterdam, Netherlands; 10 June 1997
- Genre: Drum and bass
- Length: 8:18
- Label: BMG; 74321 51254 1
- Songwriter(s): David Bowie

David Bowie singles chronology
"Seven Years in Tibet" (1997)	"Pallas Athena" (1997)	"I'm Afraid of Americans" (1997)

"Pallas Athena" is a song written by David Bowie in 1993 for the album Black Tie White Noise. A live version of the song was recorded and released in 1997 during Bowie's Earthling Tour.

== Background ==
The name is taken from the Greek goddess, Athena, the goddess of wisdom, who is famously depicted in Athenian statues and on coins in the form of Pallas Athena. Hence, the name of the song is a suggestion of religion and icons and sets the mood for a dark piece concerning the power that religion has over man.

The lyrics are rather sparse, but the phrase beginning the piece, "God is on top of it, that's all," delivered as though from an African-American preacher, is ominous and intimidating, accompanied with the sound of strings delivering a sorrowful melody. The piece develops into a techno dance piece, using string sounds to hold the ominous mood while overlaid atop bass and drums. David Bowie's saxophone playing is amplified into a scream-like sound, which solos, along with Lester Bowie on trumpet. A lyric, "We are, we are, we are, we are praying," is repeated through the close of the song in a somber, monk-like fashion. Ultimately, the song restates Bowie's interest in how man relates with God.

Bowie played a drum and bass version of the song during his 1997 Earthling Tour, and a live version recorded at Paradiso, Holland 10 June 1997 was released as a single under the name Tao Jones Index, a very limited edition only available on 12" vinyl.

It was announced in March 2010 that a digital download EP would be made available in June 2010.

== Track listing ==
All tracks are written by David Bowie.

=== 12": Arista / MEAT 1 (UK) ===
1. "Pallas Athena" (Don't Stop Praying Remix No 2) - 7:24
2. "Pallas Athena" (Don't Stop Praying Remix) - 5:36
3. "Pallas Athena" (Gone Midnight Mix) - 4:21
- UK 1993 promo
- All mixes were untitled in the original release, with the titles provided on later reissues
- All remixes by Jack Dangers, Don't Stop Praying Remix No 2 and Gone Midnight Mix were not released elsewhere at the time

=== 12": Arista / 74321 51254 1 (UK) ===
1. "Pallas Athena (live)" - 8:18
2. "V-2 Schneider (live)" - 6:45
- Both tracks recorded live at Paradiso, Amsterdam 10 June 1997
- Limited edition - 2,000 copies printed

=== 2010 Digital Download EP ===
1. "Pallas Athena (Album Version)" - 4:40
2. "Pallas Athena (Don't Stop Praying Remix)" - 5:38
3. "Pallas Athena (Don't Stop Praying Remix No. 2)" - 7.24
4. "Pallas Athena (Gone Midnight mix)" - 4.20

== Other releases ==
The "Don't Stop Praying Remix" and album version of "Pallas Athena" appeared on the single "Jump They Say" (April 1993), and the "Don't Stop Praying Remix No 2" was released as a bonus track on the Japanese CD version of Black Tie White Noise, as well as the tenth anniversary edition in multiple territories. The "Gone Midnight" remix also appears on the 2003 re-release of the Sound + Vision box set.

The live version, mixed by Mark Plati, was released on the single "Seven Years in Tibet" in August 1997, on the EP Earthling in the City (November 1997), and the 2003 re-release of the Sound + Vision box set.

The album version was remastered and released in 2021 as part of the box set Brilliant Adventure (1992–2001).
