= Outside (David Bowie album) =

1995 studio album by David Bowie

Studio album by David Bowie
- Released: 25 September 1995
- Recorded: March–November 1994; January–February 1995
- Studios: Mountain (Montreux); Westside (London); The Hit Factory (New York City)
- Genres: Art rock; experimental rock; industrial rock; avant-garde jazz; electronica; ambient
- Length: 74:36
- Labels: Arista; BMG; RCA; Virgin
- Producers: David Bowie; Brian Eno; David Richards

David Bowie chronology
Rarestonebowie (1995)	Outside (1995)	BBC Sessions 1969–1972 (Sampler) (1996)

Singles from Outside
- 1. "The Hearts Filthy Lesson" Released: 11 September 1995; 2. "Strangers When We Meet" Released: 20 November 1995; 3. "Hallo Spaceboy (Pet Shop Boys remix)" Released: 19 February 1996

Outside (stylised as 1.Outside and subtitled The Nathan Adler Diaries: A Hyper Cycle) is the twentieth studio album by the English musician David Bowie, released on 25 September 1995 through Virgin Records in the United States and Arista Records, BMG and RCA Records in other territories. Reuniting Bowie with the musician Brian Eno following the late 1970s Berlin Trilogy, the two were inspired by concepts "outside" the mainstream, such as various outsider and performance artists. Recorded throughout 1994, the experimental sessions saw Bowie conceive a world where "art crimes", such as murder, pervade society. The resulting Leon project initially faced resistance from labels due to its uncommercial nature. The project's bootlegging led to additional sessions in 1995 to revise the concept and record more commercial material, inspired by a diary Bowie wrote for Q.

Influenced by the television series Twin Peaks, the nonlinear narrative of Outside concerns the residents of the fictional Oxford Town, New Jersey, and follows the detective Nathan Adler as he investigates the murder of a 14-year-old girl. The tracks show perspectives of specific characters, while spoken word between-song segues convey more character ideals; the story and Adler's diary entries were presented in the album's CD booklet. Musically, Outside displays styles from art rock, industrial rock and jazz, to electronica and ambient. The album cover is a self-portrait of Bowie.

Released at the height of Britpop in the UK, Outside received mixed reviews from critics. While most praised the music, others found the concept pretentious and hard to follow. Nevertheless, many considered it Bowie's finest record since 1980's Scary Monsters. Outside peaked at number 8 in the UK and number 21 in the US. The lead single, "The Hearts Filthy Lesson", performed poorly but the following singles, "Strangers When We Meet" and a remix of "Hallo Spaceboy" featuring Pet Shop Boys, performed well in the UK.

Bowie supported the album through the Outside Tour, but was criticised for not playing older hits. Multiple planned sequels to Outside never came to fruition, leaving the album's story on a cliffhanger. Instead, Bowie used musical ideas from the album and tour for his next record, Earthling (1997). Retrospectively, Outside has received more positive assessments, with most continuing to praise the music but criticising the story and length. The album was reissued in 2003 and remastered in 2021 as part of the box set Brilliant Adventure (1992–2001).

== Background and inspiration ==
David Bowie formalised his marriage to the model Iman in a June 1992 ceremony that featured numerous celebrity guests, including the multi-instrumentalist Brian Eno, whom Bowie previously worked with on his late-1970s Berlin Trilogy. (Note: Low, "Heroes" (both 1977) and Lodger (1979).) Primarily known for his work in the ambient genre at that time, by 1992, Eno was a highly respected producer, working with bands such as U2 on Achtung Baby (1991). (Note: Bowie's biographers note that Achtung Baby's sound is highly reminiscent of Bowie and Eno's 1970s collaborations. Achtung Baby was also recorded at Hansa Tonstudio in Berlin, where Bowie recorded "Heroes".) The BBC's radio presenter John Peel commented: "He's one of those people ...who has drifted into a kind of elder statesman media role where people take everything he says terribly seriously." At the wedding, Eno expressed interest in working with Bowie again after he gave him a tape that showcased the styles Bowie would explore on his then-upcoming album Black Tie White Noise (1993). After Eno listened to Bowie's The Buddha of Suburbia (1993), the two agreed to collaborate.

[Brian and I] realised we were both interested in nibbling at the periphery of the mainstream rather than jumping in. We sent each other long manifestos about what was missing in music and what we should be doing. We decided to really experiment and go into the studio with not even a gnat of an idea.

— David Bowie on reuniting with Eno, 1995

Bowie and Eno prepared for the new project in late 1993, which included sending each other ideas. The former's Tin Machine bandmate Reeves Gabrels recalled that one was the equivalent of "a mathematical problem". According to the author Paul Trynka, the ideas formed "harked back" to Bowie's musical findings during his first trip to America in early 1971. Looking for inspiration, the pair visited the Gugging psychiatric hospital near Vienna, Austria, in January 1994, which contained a wing whose patients were well known for their "outsider art". Bowie later told Interview: "Some of them don't even do [their art] as an expression of themselves; they do it because their work is them." The experience gave the upcoming album its title.

Bowie also found captivation with the Minotaur, a mythical figure from classical antiquity. He painted the figure throughout the early 1990s and, after seeing a New York Times article discussing it, incorporated it as a motif for Outside. (Note: Bowie's fascination with the Minotaur led him to contribute to a 1994 art show called Minotaur Myths and Legends, while the figure dominated his 1995 solo art exhibition title New Afro/Pagan and Work: 1975–1995.) By 1994, Bowie's interest in contemporary art grew to the point where he joined the editorial board of Modern Painters. His interest in performance artists such as Rudolf Schwarzkogler, Ron Athey, Chris Burden, (Note: Burden was previously referenced by Bowie in the "Heroes" track "Joe the Lion" (1977).) and Damien Hirst all influenced the new album's concept. Regarding the concept of death as art, Bowie told Vox:

Apart from this unhealthy, almost obsessive interest in ritualistic artists, [...] [Outside] also has some sort of a feeling of this new paganism that seems to be springing up with the advent of scarifications, piercings, tribalisms, tattoos and whatever. It's like a replacement for a spiritual starvation that's going on [and] like a tribe with dim memories of what their rituals used to be. They're sort of being dragged back again in this new, mutated, deviant way, with so-called gratuitous sex and violence in popular culture and people cutting bits off themselves. For me, it seems like a natural kind of thing.

== Recording and production ==
=== Initial sessions ===
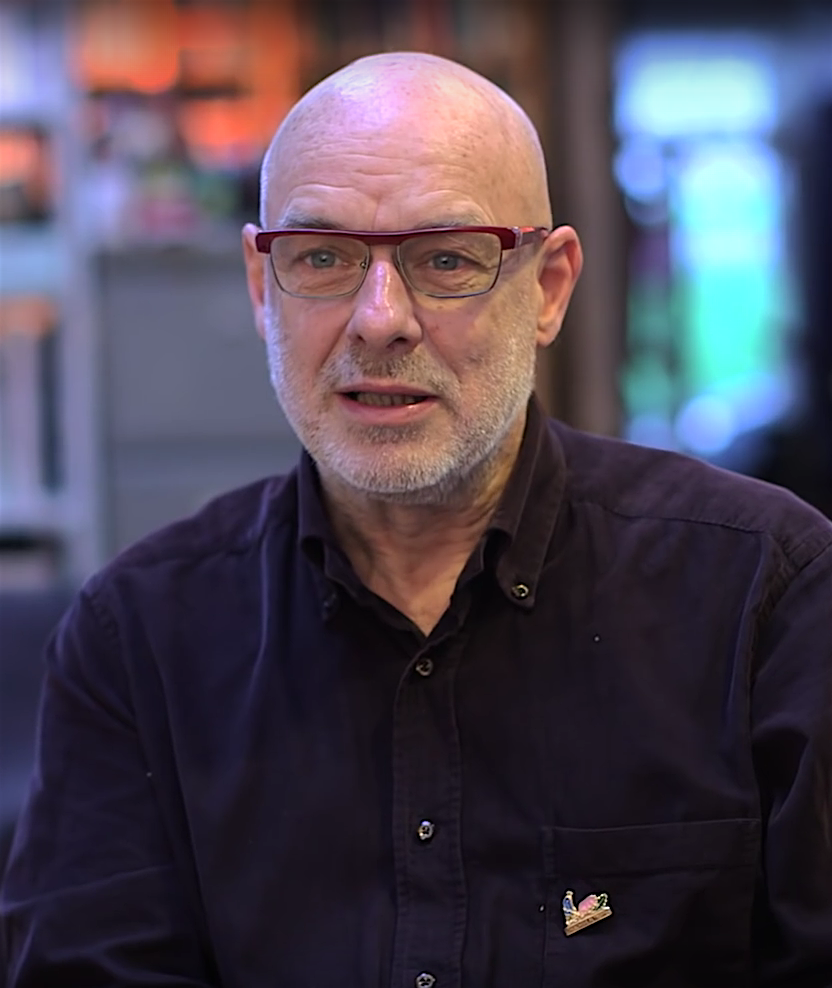
Bowie's primary collaborator for Outside was Brian Eno (pictured in 2015), who had previously worked with Bowie on his late-1970s Berlin Trilogy.

Recording for Outside began in March 1994 at Mountain Studios in Montreux, Switzerland. Production was handled by Bowie, Eno and David Richards, the co-producer of Never Let Me Down (1987) and The Buddha of Suburbia. Bowie and Eno were adamant about creating something different from the Berlin albums. The latter explained: "We don't want to make another record of a bunch of songs. There's got to be a bigger landscape in play than that." Returning Bowie collaborators included Gabrels on guitar, Erdal Kızılçay on bass, (Note: After contributing to Never Let Me Down and The Buddha of Suburbia, Outside marked Bowie and Kızılçay's final collaboration.) and Mike Garson on piano. (Note: Garson was a regular in the mid-1970s and guested on Black Tie White Noise and Buddha.) Also returning from Black Tie was Soul Asylum drummer Sterling Campbell, whom Bowie described as "spontaneous and extremely inventive. [He] plays a song differently every time; there are different shades of his teacher, Dennis Davis." (Note: Davis was Bowie's primary drummer from 1975 to 1980.)

Departing from the process of Bowie's most recent works, the majority of the tracks were composed on the spot in the studio; some were entirely improvised. During the sessions, Bowie and Eno used experimental techniques previously utilised during the Berlin Trilogy sessions, such as the latter's Oblique Strategies cards – "part-fortune cookie, part-Monopoly 'Chance' cards" intended to spark creative ideas. Each one contained a written character, such as "You are the disgruntled member of a South African rock band. Play the notes that were suppressed." Bowie elaborated that the cards set the tone for each day, taking the music into "obscure" directions: "And it would very rarely lapse into the cliché." Eno stated that this was done as a way for the musicians to "free you from being yourself". Garson and Gabrels responded favourably to the cards, but Kızılçay was opposed at first, finding them confusing and useless. He later complained about Eno's methods to Bowie biographer Marc Spitz: "he cannot even play four bars ...[nor] play two harmonies together. [...] I don't know how he became so famous."

Bowie primarily painted during the sessions. According to Eno, he "almost sat out on the first few days of that record. [...] We were creating musical situations and occasionally he would join in if it became interesting." In his diary entry dated 3 March 1994, Bowie wrote that he was happy with the current musical direction and had plans to remake the Buddha track "Dead Against It", although this never came to fruition. To compose the lyrics, Bowie ran words through an Apple Macintosh program which mirrored the William S. Burroughs-inspired cut-up technique he had previously used for albums such as Diamond Dogs (1974). He explained: "I used bits of poems and articles out of magazines and newspapers, and I retyped them out and put them into the computer ...it spews it all back out again, and I make of it what I will." Each musician received their own corner of the studio, which Trynka states contributed to the overall arrangement "as an art happening". Discussing the studio atmosphere, Garson told biographer David Buckley: "It was one of the most creative environments I have ever been in. We would just start playing. There was no key given, no tonal centre, no form, no nothing." The sessions were also filmed by a camera crew; Garson commented that "[the crew] knew it was special on some level."

The backing tracks were completed in 10 days, while overdubs continued on and off until November 1994. Roughly 25 to 30 hours of material was recorded, which was initially edited down to two CDs worth of content: an "improvised opera" titled Leon. The material was mixed at Westside Studios in London. Eno initially wanted to release the work with black cover artwork and no name attached. Gabrels elaborated: "Let it leak that it was David Bowie but put it out as a completely separate entity, like Prince's The Black Album [1994]. Use it as a work of art and lapse something that creates interest for the next project." According to the biographer Chris O'Leary, the contents were bootlegged and resulted in Bowie's dismissal of the Leon concept. Gabrels commented on his website in 2003 that Leon "would have been a very serious musical statement, and maybe pissed off more people than Tin Machine".

=== Later sessions ===
Bowie initially faced opposition from record labels due to the uncommercial nature of the Leon recordings. Gabrels told Buckley: "It was never said to me that it had been rejected for want of commercial material. I just thought the decision was made that [Leon] would have been insane to put out from a commercial point of view …and that we needed to rerecord some more songs." Bowie elected to record some more conventional tracks, for which sessions took place at the Hit Factory in New York City from January to February 1995. Songs recorded in New York included "Outside", "Thru These Architects Eyes", "We Prick You", "I Have Not Been to Oxford Town", "No Control", a rerecording of the Buddha track "Strangers When We Meet", and reworkings of "Hallo Spaceboy" and "I'm Deranged". (Note: An early version of the Earthling track "I'm Afraid of Americans" (1997), titled "Dummy", was recorded during this time; it first appeared on the Showgirls soundtrack in 1995.)

New personnel additions included the guitarist Carlos Alomar, Bowie's former bandleader who was fired following the 1987 Glass Spider Tour; Tin Machine contributor Kevin Armstrong on "Thru These Architects Eyes"; and the jazz drummer Joey Baron, whom Bowie felt was "so steady" that "metronomes shake in fear". Armstrong's song "Now", first attempted by Tin Machine during the sessions for their 1989 debut album, was adapted into the title track. Armstrong recorded his contributions at Westside.

== Concept and story ==
With 1. Outside, placing the eerie environment of a Diamond Dogs city now in the nineties gives it an entirely different spin. It was important for this town, this locale, to have a populace, a number of characters. I tried to diversify these really eccentric types as much as possible [...] The narrative and the stories are not the content – the content is the spaces in between the linear bits. The queasy, strange textures.

— David Bowie explaining the Outside characters and setting, 1995

The concept of Outside originated on 12 March 1994, during what Bowie called a "blindingly orgiastic" recording session. As the band improvised, he conceived numerous characters on the spot, playing each out "for maybe five minutes at a time". He later revealed that "almost the entire genesis for [Outside] is contained in those three and a half hours". In what Bowie labelled a "non-linear Gothic drama hyper-cycle", he developed a world where "art crimes", which Jason Draper of Dig! described as "murder and mutilation for public consumption", pervade society, and "concept muggings" merit their own police division funded by the "Arts Protectorate of London".

In late 1994, Q asked Bowie to write a diary for 10 days as a way to contribute to their 100th issue. Fearing the diary would be uninteresting if presented as a pure day-by-day account, he revised the Leon concept and wrote what became the basis for Outside: The Diary of Nathan Adler or the Art-Ritual Murder of Baby Grace Belew. The same story, with mild revisions, appeared in the album's CD booklet. According to Gabrels, Bowie "looked into [the Leon concept] further and revised and rewrote. [...] The order and plot were imposed/invented ...after the fact." While characters lacked motivations on Leon, they now had distinct personalities and motives on Outside, similar to the board game Cluedo. Taking influences from the television series Twin Peaks, Outside concerns the fictional Oxford Town, New Jersey, and its inhabitants, including: a detective named Nathan Adler; a jeweler named Ramona A. Stone; a 14-year-old girl named Baby Grace Blue; a 78-year-old loner named Algeria Touchshriek; a mixed-race "Outsider" named Leon Blank; Paddy, one of Adler's informants; and a shadowy figure named the Artist/Minotaur. Bowie, who portrayed all the characters, stated that he based all of them on himself, which AllMusic's Roch Parisien found "therefore, a component of all the previous personas Bowie has enacted over the years."

A diary entry from the CD booklet of Outside. The entries provided more insight into the concept and story.

The story of Outside takes place over two decades, between 1977 and 1999, and is presented in a nonlinear narrative. The album's CD booklet contained Adler's diary entries alongside song lyrics which were sometimes distorted and unreadable. The album also invokes several spoken word segments as between-song segues, which provide more insight into the story and characters' thoughts. Parisien considered the segues reminiscent of the "Cockney campiness" of Bowie's 1960s tracks "Please Mr. Gravedigger" and "The Laughing Gnome". (Note: O'Leary finds that "Wishful Beginnings" pays "a great debt" to "Please Mr. Gravedigger". Additionally, Bowie was asked by a fan if he was ever going to re-record "Please Mr. Gravedigger", to which he replied, "I did already. It was called 1. Outside.") Described by some as a concept album, Music Week's Paul Gorman found the use of narrative on Outside a callback to Ziggy Stardust (1972) and Diamond Dogs. Bowie described Adler, the protagonist, as an individual who uses nostalgia to look back on simpler times: "He's really rather despondent that things are broken into this fragmented chaotic kind of state." O'Leary considers the character "more terse" on Outside than in Leon. Adler's perspective is shown in "The Hearts Filthy Lesson", "No Control" and two segues. Stone, the villain, begins as a punk rock "no-future priestess" and ends as a "good time drone" running a jewelry store. Bowie manipulated his own voice using various synthesisers to portray her. Her point of view is given in a segue and "I Am with Name".

The dismembered body of Baby Grace Blue is found in a town museum. The scene is described in detail in the CD booklet while on the album, the girl's last words appear in a cassette tape ("Segue – Baby Grace (A Horrid Cassette)"). Bowie stated that Grace's voice meant the most to him as he based it on a close friend who was struggling with a relationship at the time. After the body is found, Adler's primary goal is to find the murderer. The character of Algeria Touchshriek "deals in art-drugs and DNA prints". Based on numerous characters from Bowie's 1960s songs, Touchshriek is described in a segue as walking near the museum where the body was found and that he "knew Leon once". Blank, one of Stone's former lovers, is an outsider artist and murder suspect. Bowie characterised him as a blend of musician Tricky and painter Jean-Michel Basquiat. Throughout the album, he is primarily viewed through the eyes of others ("Leon Takes Us Outside", "The Motel" and "Strangers When We Meet"), but is given his own perspective on "I Have Not Been to Oxford Town", where he denies his involvement with the killings; Blank is also ascribed to "Thru' These Architects Eyes", although the track has little to do with the Outside narrative. The Artist/Minotaur is a figure who "lurks behind the art-ritual murder" at the narrative's centre. His point of view is given during "The Voyeur of Utter Destruction (as Beauty)", "Wishful Beginnings" and "I'm Deranged". The residents of Oxford Town convey thoughts on "A Small Plot of Land", while "We Prick You" concerns the ideals of the Members of the Court of Justice.

== Musical styles ==
"Outside"
An audio sample, displaying musical textures that are present throughout Outside, including elements of electronica. It sets the stage for the entire album in relation to both its music and overall concept.

"We Prick You"
"We Prick You" combines elements of jungle and drum and bass music, both of which Bowie fully embraced for his next studio album, Earthling (1997).

Outside contains a wide variety of musical styles, including rock, jazz, electronica, industrial rock and ambient. Writers for The Independent and BBC News retrospectively categorised it as art rock and industrial rock. Adam Trainer of PopMatters similarly described the music as "chiefly industrial and trip hop, as filtered through the lens of art rock". He further argued that the album's "soundscapes" showcased "the rock/electronic hybridity" that would be labeled by music analysts and the mainstream as post-rock. The biographer Christopher Sandford finds the music evocative of the "faux-jazz stylings" found on Aladdin Sane (1973), while in Spin, Barry Walters noted the presence of progressive rock. Other commentators, including Nick DeRiso of Ultimate Classic Rock, recognised styles of techno, grunge and industrial over "the electronic soundbeds" that exemplified the Berlin Trilogy. Other styles recognised by Bowie's biographers include dark ambient ("Leon Takes Us Outside"), acid jazz ("The Hearts Filthy Lesson"), funk ("I Have Not Been to Oxford Town", "The Voyeur of Utter Destruction (as Beauty)"), avant-garde jazz and classical ("The Motel", "A Small Plot of Land"), and conventional pop ("I Have Not Been to Oxford Town", "Strangers When We Meet"). Certain tracks, such as "The Hearts Filthy Lesson", "I'm Deranged" and "We Prick You", combine elements of jungle and drum and bass, genres Bowie fully explored on his next studio album, Earthling (1997).

Buckley says the album's overall sound is "dense and textural, underpinned by a booming rhythm section". Writing for Rock and Roll Globe, Lee Zimmerman stated: "The music flow[s] in a continuous surge of sound and expression, a forward thrust that left little room for melody, but shared an intriguing atmospheric ambiance instead." The author James E. Perone finds many tracks act as "mood pieces" for the entire album rather than as standalone tracks. According to the writer Alan Franks: "The songs have a slow, careful build into the pay-off line but they're absolutely not written as pop songs and they're not particularly written as rock songs. It's almost like what Jacques Brel would be going now if he'd gone heavy." Biographers have also compared certain sounds on Outside to Bowie's previous albums, such as Diamond Dogs, Lodger (1979), Scary Monsters (1980), and Tonight (1984). Nicholas Pegg characterises the segues' musical styles as mostly ambient, with guitar, piano and synthesiser backings. Trainer commented that they "speak to the role of the Leon suites in the development of Outside".

The first two tracks, "Leon Takes Us Outside" and the title track, musically set the stage for the rest of the album. "The Hearts Filthy Lesson" contains an almost atonal groove that Pegg calls "a slab of industrial techno-rock" over an "eccentric jazz-piano figure". Continuing the jazz flavour is "A Small Plot of Land", which builds to a climax to become one of the album's "more challenging tracks" to Pegg. "Hallo Spaceboy", which was developed from an instrumental written by Gabrels titled "Moondust", is an industrial track that Pegg calls "a hardcore maelstrom of sci-fi noise, hypnotic high-speed drumming and an insistent, speaker-hopping four-note guitar riff". Spitz names it Bowie's "most convincing rocker" since "Rebel Rebel" (1974).

"The Motel", which Pegg considers the album's centrepiece, is compared by Buckley to the Walker Brothers' "The Electrician" (1978), while Perone compares "I Have Not Been to Oxford Town" to Queen's "We Will Rock You" (1977). "No Control" brings a darker tone to the album, featuring a "hard-edged synth bassline". Later on, "I Am with Name" reprises the "atmospherics" of the album's opening. "Wishful Beginnings" evokes "a mysterious, abstract melody over slowly building, layered, synthesized electronic sounds". "I'm Deranged" conveys similar musical styles that pervade the rest of the album. Compared to the original version on The Buddha of Suburbia, the remake of "Strangers When We Meet" contains a more lush arrangement influenced by U2's Eno co-produced The Joshua Tree (1987). Pegg writes that it resolves the album's "angst and black comedy" with a "soothing slice of conventional pop". On the other hand, Trainer considered it an "odd" way to end the album and "clearly an attempt to...inject a sense of calm whilst perpetuating the noir-ish air of mystery".

== Leon recordings ==
Described by Gabrels as a "three-hour improvised opus", the Leon recordings are available through bootlegs in three separate "suites", each between 22 and 27 minutes long. A fully mixed 70-minute reel was also released by a private collector in 2003. According to Pegg, the released piece is significantly more uncommercial than the final Outside album, featuring a slew of "ambient soundscapes" and longer versions of the album's segues. It also features numerous repetitive phrases and loops amongst interplay between the musicians. Trainer found the recordings to be "underdeveloped" compared to Outside, describing them more as "loose jams" typified by "plodding beats and unformed repetitive structures that lack the dynamics [the finished Outside album] would yield".

The first suite is divided into three movements. The opening ten-minute number "I Am with Name" contains longer and more obscene variations of the Stone and first Adler segues. O'Leary notes that more voices appear on Leon than Outside, highlighting a character who "sounds as if rats are climbing over his body" four minutes into the suite. A more melodic five-minute movement titled "We'll Creep Together" follows, featuring Garson's "rippling" piano over a slew of sound effects such as gunshot noises. "I'd Rather Be Chrome" follows, displaying a repeating phrase throughout and contains more narration from Adler over, in Pegg's words, a "prowling, catchy riff", before the lyrics delve into topics previously explored on Low (1977).

The second suite, titled "The Enemy Is Fragile", is categorised by O'Leary as the centrepiece of Leon. It features patterns similar to "A Small Plot of Land", along with funk playing from the backing musicians, numerous sound effects and narration from Adler and Stone. Some of the narration reflects themes present in The Silence of the Lambs (1991). The piece builds to a climax with various repeated phrases before ending with a drum fill. The rest of the suite consists of the first appearance of the Artist/Minotaur and various synthesisers, with additional piano and saxophone. One section, titled "Nothing to Be Desired", was issued as a bonus track on "The Hearts Filthy Lesson" CD single, and remains the only material from Leon that was officially released. Following "Nothing to Be Desired" is lengthy variations of the "Baby Grace" and "Algeria Touchshriek" segues.

The third and final suite, titled "Leon Takes Us Outside", further develops the character of Blank; the opening section became the opening to Outside. It begins as a jazzy instrumental with guitar, piano and synthesisers, with more repetitive phrases and narration from Adler and Stone; one sequence fully conveys Adler's story. According to O'Leary, the suite closes with feedback and a drum fill. Shortly after the release of Outside, Bowie expressed interest in making the Leon material officially available, although the idea never came to fruition.

== Release ==
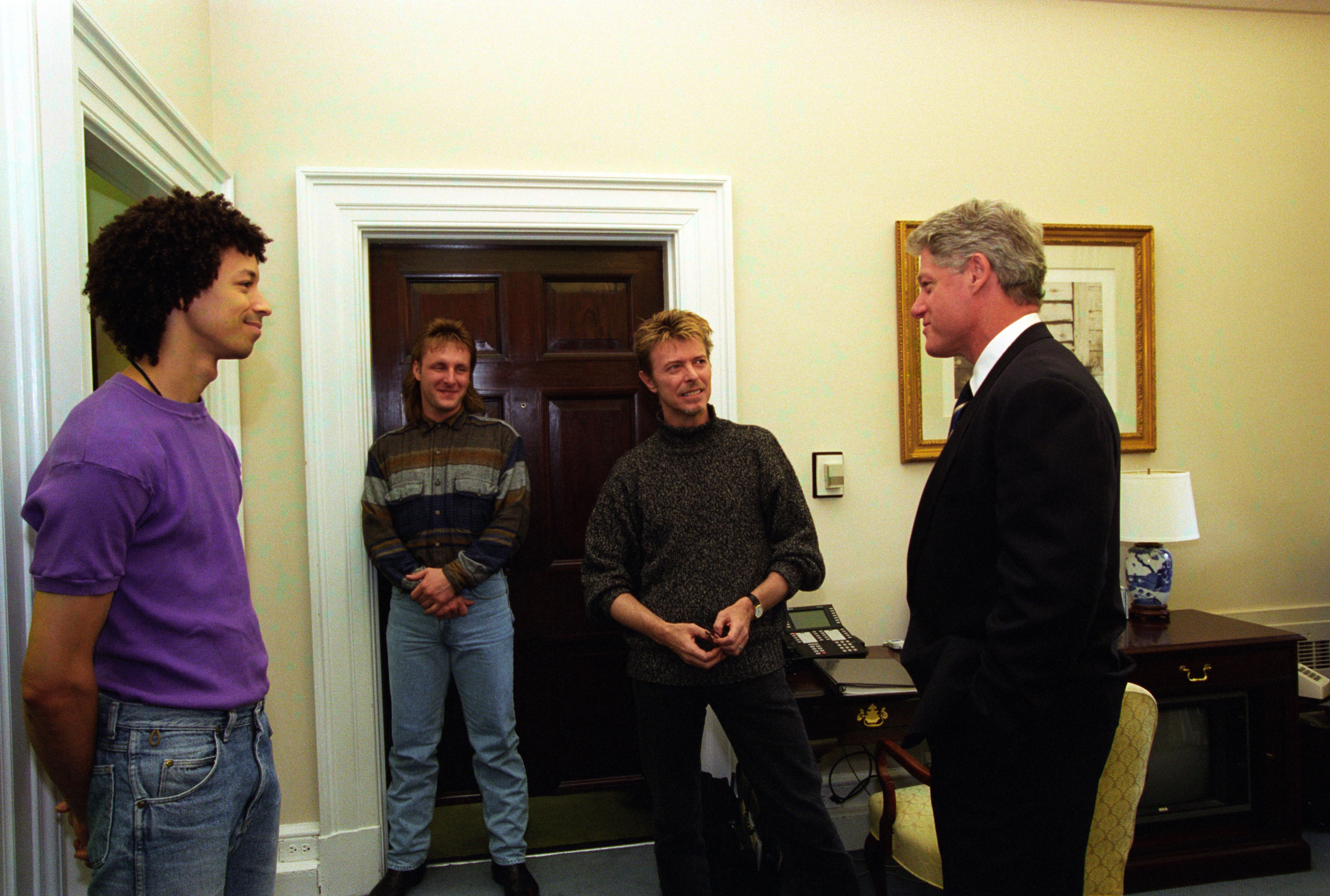
Bowie (right centre) with members of his band visiting then-US president Bill Clinton (right) in October 1995, shortly after the release of Outside.

Without a label for the third time in three years, Outside's release was delayed while Bowie attempted to find an American distributor, later commenting, "Nobody would take Outside when we first recorded it." In June 1995, Bowie signed a contract with Virgin America Records, telling Music Connection in September that the label were "extremely supportive" regarding the Outside concept and allowed Bowie full creative control in the studio. Additionally, Virgin acquired the rights to Bowie's work from Let's Dance (1983) to Tin Machine, reissuing them throughout the rest of the year with bonus tracks. In Britain, Bowie entered a new deal with BMG, who issued Black Tie and Buddha in the country. BMG were now affiliated with RCA Records, Bowie's label throughout the 1970s and whom he had departed in 1982.

"The Hearts Filthy Lesson" was released as the lead single on 11 September 1995. It was accompanied by a music video directed by Samuel Bayer that was initially banned from MTV due to provocative imagery. Commercially, the single performed poorly, peaking at number 35 on the UK Singles Chart and number 92 on the US Billboard Hot 100. Pegg and Trynka state that Bowie desired to display a video of "artistic merit" rather than for chart appeal.

Outside, stylised as 1. Outside – The Nathan Adler Diaries: A Hyper-cycle, was released on 25 September 1995 by Virgin America in the US and Arista, BMG and RCA in other territories on LP and CD formats. The CD release was the full 75-minute album. However, the LP release was an abridged version titled Excerpts From 1. Outside; the LP version featured shortened edits of "Leon Takes Us Outside" and "The Motel" and removed the tracks "No Control", "Wishful Beginnings", "Thru' These Architects Eyes", "Strangers When We Meet", along with multiple segues. The Japanese CD release included the outtake "Get Real". The cover artwork is a 1995 painting on canvas by Bowie himself called Head of DB. Commercially, Outside peaked at number 8 on the UK Albums Chart and number 21 on the US Billboard 200; Bowie's profile in America had been raised through the popularity of Nirvana's MTV Unplugged version of "The Man Who Sold the World", as well as artists who cited Bowie's influence such as Nine Inch Nails, the Smashing Pumpkins and Marilyn Manson. Due to advance orders, Outside became Bowie's fastest-selling album since Tonight.

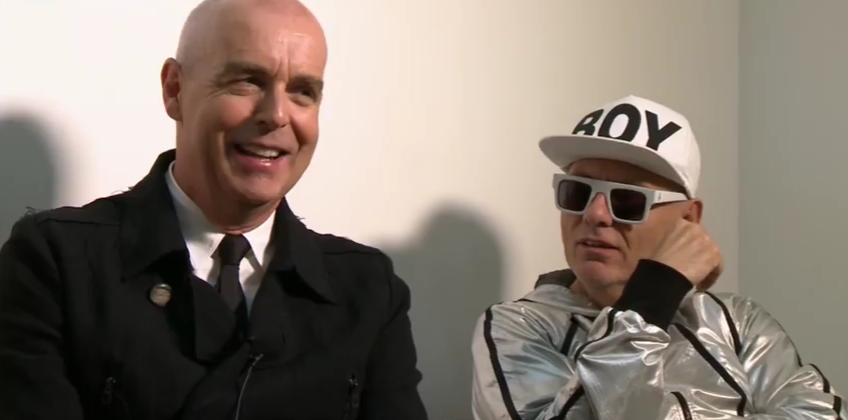
For its release as a single, "Hallo Spaceboy" was issued in remixed form featuring the English duo Pet Shop Boys (pictured in 2013).

Bowie promoted Outside through various television appearances. "Strangers When We Meet" was issued as a double A-side single with a new recording of "The Man Who Sold the World" mixed by Eno on 20 November 1995. It reached number 39 in the UK and was supported by a music video, again directed by Bayer. Bowie performed the song at the European MTV Awards the same month. "Hallo Spaceboy" was released as the third and final single on 19 February 1996 in a new remix featuring the English duo Pet Shop Boys. The idea originated from Neil Tennant, who added lines referencing Major Tom from "Space Oddity" (1969). Pet Shop Boys subsequently appeared in the song's video, directed by longtime Bowie director David Mallet, and performed the song with Bowie at the Brit Awards in February and on Top of the Pops in March. The single itself performed well commercially, peaking at number 12 in the UK. The remix later replaced "Wishful Beginnings" on the March 1996 European reissue of Outside titled 1. Outside Version 2.

=== Art-Crime Comic ===
Anticipating that the narrative of the album might be inaccessible to fans when it was released, one of the record executives in Mexico, Arturo López Gavito, commissioned a comic to clarify the story. The comic, a one-off called Art-Crime, was created by two young illustrators, Victor "Pico" Covarrubias and Jotavé (Jazmin Velasco-Moore). It was given away with the CD.

=== Context ===
In 1995, the UK music scene was dominated by Britpop bands such as Suede, Blur, Pulp and Oasis, all of whom were indebted to Bowie's 1970s works. In his book The Last Party, the British journalist John Harris states, "David Bowie was a far greater influence on Britpop than any artist of the '60s." Pegg writes that while older artists such as Paul Weller and Adam Ant were releasing successful Britpop records in 1995, Bowie stood in tangent with industrial rock artists like Nine Inch Nails and techno artists such as Tricky, Goldie and the Chemical Brothers. Buckley says that the only record that was stylistically similar to Outside at the time was Scott Walker's Tilt, released four months prior.

Further analysing the cultural landscape beyond music at that time, Pegg states that Outside arrived alongside the "glamorous cruelty" of Pulp Fiction (1994); "inhabited the trashy cyberpunk milieu" of films such as Judge Dredd, Tank Girl and 12 Monkeys (all 1995); and exhibited elements of "extraterrestrial conspiracy theories" brought to the forefront on television by The X-Files. Outside was also one of the first albums in the age of the internet and showcased the same "pre-millennial angst" as Pulp's late 1995 single "Disco 2000".

Tracks from Outside were also used in entertainment. "The Hearts Filthy Lesson" was played over the end credits of Seven (1995), while "A Small Plot of Land" was the theme song for the 1996 BBC miniseries A History of British Art. Pegg concludes: "For the first time since [1980's] Scary Monsters, Bowie had released an album that accessed the zeitgeist at all levels."

== Critical reception ==
Professional ratings
Review scores
Source	Rating
AllMusic	3/5 stars
Blender	3/5 stars
Encyclopedia of Popular Music	3/5 stars
Entertainment Weekly	B−
Los Angeles Times	3/4 stars
NME	7/10
Pitchfork (2021)	8.2/10
Q	3/5 stars
Rolling Stone	3/5 stars
The Rolling Stone Album Guide	1/5 stars
Select	2/5
Spin	6/10

Reviews of Outside were mixed on release. While the majority praised the music as challenging, many felt the overarching concept was hard to follow, with some finding it pretentious. Among positive reviews, critics considered Outside Bowie's best record since Scary Monsters. (Note: Attributed to multiple references:) A writer for Time Out elaborated: "[The] edifice of sounds, cultures, rhythms, samples and textures, with randomised lyrics that don't much tell a story as create word-moods, regards the open-minded listener with Bowie's best album for 15 years." In The Daily Telegraph, Charles Shaar Murray welcomed "an excellent David Bowie album, a genuine creative rebirth. Threatening and murky ... His gift for the charismatically disturbing seems to have reasserted itself." Later, in Mojo, Murray considered it Bowie's "official" comeback album, praising the music as a callback to the Berlin Trilogy and concluded: "[It's] a mad, bad, dangerous album – by turns, chilling, pretty, ugly, scary, gripping and vastly intriguing."

Some reviewers found the music among Bowie's most innovative; a writer for Melody Maker announced that Bowie "is poised to be a healthy influence once more on a fifth generation of glamorous chameleons." An NME reviewer stated, "Bowie's scalpel is certainly closer to the pulse than for years." Other publications, such as Today, considered Bowie's vocal performances throughout the record some of his finest. David Fricke of Rolling Stone appreciated the lyrics as "smart", "effective" and "sly", especially on "I Have Not Been to Oxford Town" and "A Small Plot of Land". He mostly criticised the spoken segues, arguing that they "damn near sink the record". Paul Verna of Billboard found the album "stumbles" on the segues, stating that they "advance the plotline but hold little musical interest". They argued that if listeners "cherry-pick" throughout, Outside "stands a chance of reestablishing Bowie as a vital artist".

Other reviewers expressed more mixed assessments. Entertainment Weekly's David Browne found the majority of the record sounding like "fodder" and felt that it would benefit from a visual aid, such as through tour performances. Sandy Masuo of the Los Angeles Times enjoyed certain tracks but felt overall, Bowie was experimenting in genres that, by 1995, were being made more successfully by other artists. Select Gareth Grundy also found a lack of musical innovation, albeit highlighting "Hallo Spaceboy", "No Control" and "We Prick You" as standouts.

Some reviewers believed the album would appeal to Bowie's longtime fans, but displease newer ones. Q's Tom Doyle said: "Regulars might feel short-changed on the tune front and those legions who came in on Let's Dance will most certainly be left completely and utterly bewildered. Perhaps, though, that's entirely the point." The album also attracted negative responses. Grundy, in particular, called Outside "the daftest thing Bowie's done" since the Glass Spider Tour. Ikon's Taylor Parkes complained that "Bowie's desperate desire to be considered 'highbrow' has snuffed out any potential of accidental alchemy" and promptly dismissed the record as a "sorry sack of shit ... facile, confused and immature ... quite simply, rubbish."

== Tour ==
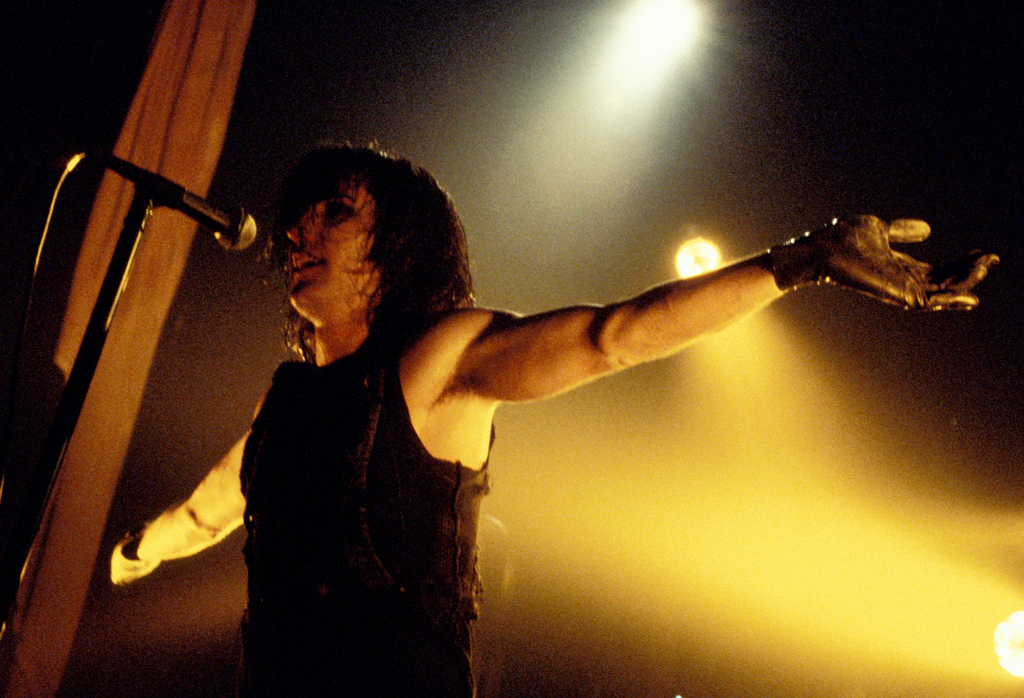
The opening act of the tour's American leg was Nine Inch Nails, led by Trent Reznor (pictured in 1994). The partnership resulted in multiple collaborations between him and Bowie in subsequent years.

In an interview with Music Week in early 1995, Bowie expressed no interest in performing the Outside material live, calling it "far too ambitious a project". Nevertheless, after enduring pressure from Virgin, Bowie rescinded and began rehearsals to tour America in August 1995, thereafter extending the number of dates by early September and adding a European leg. The tour's lineup included Gabrels, Garson and Alomar, with new additions including the vocalist George Simms from the 1983 Serious Moonlight Tour, the musical director Peter Schwartz, the drummer Zachary Alford and the bassist Gail Ann Dorsey, both of whom continued to work with Bowie frequently in subsequent years. The Outside Tour commenced on 14 September.

Nine Inch Nails opened the American shows. The frontman Trent Reznor was intimidated by the idea at first but graciously accepted. The setlists mostly consisted of the Outside material and more unknown tracks from Bowie's career, along with reworkings of older tracks to fit the new album's styles. Towards the end of the opening sets, Bowie joined Nine Inch Nails on stage, where the two artists played songs from their own catalogues such as "Subterraneans" (1977) and "Hurt" (1994), respectively. The fusion of the two artists was met with resistance from both artists' fanbases. Mojo's Chris Jones reported that during one performance, Bowie was pelted with debris from the confused crowd. The American leg concluded at the end of October. The tour's partnership between Bowie and Reznor facilitated the latter's undertaking of numerous Outside and Earthling remixes, as well as his appearance in the music video for "I'm Afraid of Americans" (1997).

The European leg commenced in November 1995 with shows at the Wembley Arena in London, with Morrissey as the opening act. Tensions between Bowie and Morrissey rose, leading the latter to depart shortly into the tour's leg; the remaining dates were opened by various local bands. The tour concluded on 20 February 1996. The UK shows, particularly Morrissey's appearances, were generally panned by concert reviewers. Throughout the tour, many criticised Bowie's decision not to sing well-known hits, to which he replied: "If they didn't know that I wasn't going to be [playing the hits], they must have been living under a rock." Despite the tour's poor reception from contemporary reviewers, Pegg states that it showcased Bowie's musical progression and was his finest tour in 20 years. Recordings from the tour were later released in 2020 on the live albums Ouvrez le Chien (Live Dallas 95) and No Trendy Réchauffé (Live Birmingham 95), as part of the series Brilliant Live Adventures (2020–2021).

== Legacy ==
=== Proposed sequels ===
The story of Outside ends on a cliffhanger, with a "to be continued..." tagline in the CD booklet. Bowie initially envisioned the album as the first in a series of records that would be released each year until the end of the millennium. He stated, "This is a once-in-a-lifetime chance, by a narrative device, to chronicle the final five years of the millennium. The over-ambitious intention is to carry this through to the year 2000." He further explained to Ikon:

Overall, a long-term ambition is to make it a series of albums extending to 1999—to try to capture, using this device, what the last five years of this millennium feel like ... Oh, I've got the fondest hopes for the Fin de siècle. I see it as a symbolic sacrificial rite. I see it as a deviance, a pagan wish to appease gods, so we can move on. There's a real spiritual starvation out there being filled by these mutations of what are barely remembered rites and rituals. [...] We have this panic button telling us it's gonna be a colossal madness at the end of this century.

Having recorded hours of extra material during the sessions, he considered releasing a companion album to Outside before revealing in early 1997 that the follow-up would be called 2. Contamination, and had sketched out characters for the project (including some "17th-century people"). (Note: A Bowie tribute album titled .2 Contamination was later released in March 2008.) He also mentioned the possibility of releasing an album called Inside which would have been a making-of about Outside: "Our working method [will be] detailed on it, a couple of jams and more of those voices." However, none of these projects came to fruition; in 1999 the satirical newspaper The Onion posted a series of letter-writing campaigns to celebrities and one of them was addressed to Bowie, asking him to complete the Outside storyline. Following his experience on the Outside Tour, Bowie took musical ideas and themes from Outside and utilised them to create Earthling.

In 2016, one day after Bowie's death, Eno recalled: "About a year ago we started talking about Outside—the last album we worked on together. We both liked that album a lot and felt that it had fallen through the cracks. We talked about revisiting it, taking it somewhere new. I was looking forward to that."

=== Retrospective assessments ===
Outside is often brilliant and inspired, daringly experimental, and on occasion frustratingly close to genius but falling slightly short. It is, arguably, more than any other album in [Bowie's] catalogue, completely in love with ideas and throwing itself at them with conviction and abandon. Bowie liked to think of himself as a curator, picking through culture for interesting notions and trying them on. On Outside, he does this with greater eagerness and relish than perhaps ever before or since.

— Adam Trainer, PopMatters, 2020

Following Bowie's death, the editors of Prog wrote that Outside would be re-evaluated as one of his finest works. Later reviewers continue praising the music as challenging, innovative and among his finest, but find the story self-indulgent. Perone argues that its nonlinear narrative makes for a hard-to-follow listening experience, and that tracks inherently tied to the album's theme—particularly the segues—prove ineffective as standalone tracks.

In the decades following its release, Trynka contends that the rise of iTunes and nonlinear listening patterns through shuffling have made reactions to Outside more positive, with Garson later calling it a career highlight. Parisien later argued: "The effort required to adequately 'process' [the album] pays off in a richly voyeuristic experience where Bowie once again reflects fringe culture onto the mainstream and forces us to consider that the differences are not so great." Zimmerman stated that beyond the tracklisting itself, the album "offered little in the way of cohesive melodies". Some also found the production dated, with Spitz calling it Bowie's "most of-its-time work since his late-sixties hippie folk material".

Several have criticised Outside as overlong; at nearly 75 minutes, it is Bowie's longest studio album. At the time, Bowie remarked that it was "extremely long by most current CD standards" and that accessibility was not a top priority when making it. However, he and Eno later regretted its long duration, with the former stating in 1997, "There's too much on it. I really should have made it two CDs." Sandford agrees, stating that it could have used more polishing and trimming. Furthermore, Perone finds that it "really begs to be listened to [in one] sitting", while Trainer stated the second half drags.

Reviewing Outside on its 25th anniversary, Trainer said it stands out as "an odd, infuriatingly dense, and often brilliant record from (and of) an artist sho [sic], having been one of popular music's leading lights in the 70s, was newly inspired". He criticised the production as dated and concept as too underdeveloped to have a long-lasting impact, but noted that its best tracks rank among Bowie's greatest. He concluded that the record "remains a compelling, complicated, frustrating and flawed listen", and due to its incomplete state, he argued that fans can finish it on their own. Pegg finds Outside was made for fans of Diamond Dogs, Low and Lodger rather than Let's Dance. Describing it as "a triumphantly queasy, deliciously unpleasant album", he concludes: "Outside remains as brilliant and intriguingly inconclusive as it was surely always supposed to be."

In a 2016 retrospective ranking all of Bowie's 26 studio albums from worst to best, Bryan Wawzenek of Ultimate Classic Rock placed Outside at number 19, writing, "It's a solid framework for Bowie and Eno to get creative within – the backgrounds are reliably intriguing, if not always satisfying." Two years later, the writers of Consequence of Sound ranked Outside number seven in a similar list, above acclaimed records such as Blackstar (2016) and Station to Station (1976), stating that the album "succeeded because Bowie bought in completely to its concept and strangeness". In 2024, the editors of Uncut ranked the album at number 112 in their list of "The 500 Greatest Albums of the 1990s", calling it a "boldly experimental" album that eschewed Bowie's earlier styles and adding that "amid the avant-gumshoe business, Mike Garson and other old pals created engrossing drama."

=== Reissues ===
In 2003, Columbia Records reissued Outside on CD in the UK, with another reissue following a year later that contained bonus tracks, including 14 remixes and B-sides. In 2015, almost 20 years after its original release, Friday Music released the full-length album on vinyl as a double-LP set. In 2021, the album was remastered and included as part of the box set Brilliant Adventure (1992–2001).

== Track listing ==
All lyrics are written by David Bowie; all music is composed by David Bowie and Brian Eno, except where noted

Outside track listing
No.	Title	Music	Sung from the perspective of	Length
1.	"Leon Takes Us Outside"	David Bowie; Brian Eno; Reeves Gabrels; Mike Garson; Erdal Kızılçay; Sterling Campbell	Leon Blank	1:25
2.	"Outside"	Bowie; Kevin Armstrong	prologue	4:04
3.	"The Hearts Filthy Lesson"	Bowie; Eno; Gabrels; Garson; Kızılçay; Campbell	Detective Nathan Adler	4:57
4.	"A Small Plot of Land"	Bowie; Eno; Gabrels; Garson; Kızılçay; Campbell	The residents of Oxford Town, New Jersey	6:36
5.	"Segue – Baby Grace (A Horrid Cassette)"	Bowie; Eno; Gabrels; Garson; Kızılçay; Campbell	Baby Grace Blue	1:39
6.	"Hallo Spaceboy"		Paddy	5:14
7.	"The Motel"	Bowie	Leon Blank	6:49
8.	"I Have Not Been to Oxford Town"		Leon Blank	3:47
9.	"No Control"		Detective Nathan Adler	4:33
10.	"Segue – Algeria Touchshriek"	Bowie; Eno; Gabrels; Garson; Kızılçay; Campbell	Algeria Touchshriek	2:03
11.	"The Voyeur of Utter Destruction (as Beauty)"	Bowie; Eno; Gabrels	The Artist/Minotaur	4:21
12.	"Segue – Ramona A. Stone" "I Am with Name"	Bowie; Eno; Gabrels; Garson; Kızılçay; Campbell	Ramona A. Stone and her acolytes	4:01
13.	"Wishful Beginnings"		The Artist/Minotaur	5:08
14.	"We Prick You"		Members of the Court of Justice	4:33
15.	"Segue – Nathan Adler"	Bowie; Eno; Gabrels; Garson; Kızılçay; Campbell	Detective Nathan Adler	1:00
16.	"I'm Deranged"		The Artist/Minotaur	4:31
17.	"Thru' These Architects Eyes"	Bowie; Gabrels	Leon Blank	4:22
18.	"Segue – Nathan Adler"		Detective Nathan Adler	0:28
19.	"Strangers When We Meet"	Bowie	Leon Blank	5:07
Total length:				74:36

Japanese CD bonus track
No.	Title	Music	Length
20.	"Get Real"	Bowie; Eno	2:49
Total length:			77:25

== Personnel ==
According to the liner notes and the biographer Nicholas Pegg:

Musicians

- David Bowie – vocals, saxophone, guitar, keyboards
- Brian Eno – synthesisers, treatments, strategies
- Reeves Gabrels – guitar
- Erdal Kızılçay – bass, keyboards
- Mike Garson – grand piano
- Sterling Campbell – drums
- Carlos Alomar – rhythm guitar
- Joey Baron – drums
- Yossi Fine – bass
- Tom Frish – additional guitar on "Strangers When We Meet"
- Kevin Armstrong – additional guitar on "Thru' These Architects Eyes"
- Bryony, Lola, Josey and Ruby Edwards – background vocals on "The Hearts Filthy Lesson" and "I Am With Name"

Production

- David Bowie – producer, mixing and additional treatments
- Brian Eno – producer
- David Richards – co-producer, mixing and additional treatments; mastering
- Kevin Metcalfe – mixing

Design

- Denovo – album design, concept and image manipulation
- David Bowie – album cover concept; Head of DB (11"x11") acrylic painting on canvas 1995
- John Scarisbrick – photography
- Jennifer Elster – stylist

== Charts ==
=== Weekly charts ===
Chart performance for Outside
Chart (1995)	Peak Position
Australian Albums (ARIA)	55
Austrian Albums (Ö3 Austria)	22
Belgian Albums (Ultratop Flanders)	12
Belgian Albums (Ultratop Wallonia)	14
Danish Albums (IFPI)	10
Dutch Albums (Album Top 100)	38
European Top 100 Albums (Music & Media)	10
Finnish Albums (Suomen virallinen lista)	26
French Albums (SNEP)	10
German Albums (Offizielle Top 100)	33
Iceland Albums (Íslenski Listinn)	7
Italy (Musica e dischi)	21
New Zealand Albums (RMNZ)	37
Norwegian Albums (VG-lista)	15
Portuguese Albums (AFP)	10
Scottish Albums (Official Charts)	16
Swedish Albums (Sverigetopplistan)	13
Swiss Albums (Schweizer Hitparade)	22
UK Albums (Official Charts)	8
US Billboard 200	21

=== Certifications and sales ===
Certifications and sales for Outside
Region	Certification	Certified units/sales
Italy	—	45,000
United Kingdom (BPI)	Silver	200,000
Summaries
Worldwide	—	1,100,000
