= Dead Man Walking (David Bowie song) =

1997 single by David Bowie

Single by David Bowie

from the album Earthling
- Released: 14 April 1997
- Studio: Looking Glass (New York City)
- Genre: Electronica
- Length: 6:50 (album version); 4:01 (single edit)
- Label: BMG; RCA
- Songwriters: David Bowie; Reeves Gabrels
- Producers: David Bowie; Reeves Gabrels; Mark Plati

David Bowie singles chronology
"Little Wonder" (1997)	"Dead Man Walking" (1997)	"Seven Years in Tibet" (1997)

Music video
- "Dead Man Walking" on YouTube

"Dead Man Walking" is a song by English musician David Bowie, released as the third single from his 21st studio album, Earthling (1997). Written by Bowie and Reeves Gabrels, it was a top 40 hit in the UK, peaking at number 32. Bowie described "Dead Man Walking" as his homage "to rock and roll that is still young while we are all growing old". As such, the lyrics reflect his thoughts on aging at this point in his career.

The music is, in author James E. Perone's words, "largely conventional dance", featuring atonal piano, sequenced keyboards and electric guitar and containing elements of Latin dance music and jazz; Biographer Nicholas Pegg describes the song as "modern rock".

== Background ==
It initially began as a tribute to actress Susan Sarandon, but took additional influences from songwriter Neil Young after Bowie, Gabrels and Dorsey performed at a pair of benefit concerts for the artist in October 1996. Bowie and Sarandon had co-starred in the 1983 film The Hunger together, while Sarandon later won an Oscar for her role in the 1995 film Dead Man Walking, which has no direct connection to Bowie's track.

The guitar riff used in the intro dates back to the mid-1960s when Jimmy Page taught it to Bowie. "Jimmy said, 'I've got this riff and I can't do anything with it. Do you want it?'" Guitarist Reeves Gabrels related: "It does sound fairly Page-y, like a mutated Johnny Burnette Trio thing." Bowie used the riff for "The Supermen" in 1970, and revived it 25 years later for "Dead Man Walking".

According to Mark Plati, the song took five days to mix: "It [began] completely programmed and by the time it's finished it's completely live."

== Critical reception ==
British magazine Music Week rated "Dead Man Walking" five out of five, declaring it as "without doubt the best track" on the Earthling album. The reviewer noted that it "demonstrates that Bowie retains a keener ear for contemporary music and a hunger greater than many artists half his age."

== Live versions ==
Bowie played an acoustic version of the song on Late Night with Conan O'Brien with Reeves Gabrels. This was later released on the show's Live from 6A compilation album. When Bowie died in January 2016, Conan O'Brien broadcast the performance at the end of his show in remembrance. Another live version recorded at Fort Apache Studios, 8 April 1997, was broadcast at WBCN. The year after this version appeared on the album WBCN Naked Too. Bowie played a different live acoustic version of "Dead Man Walking" at a concert at Smith's Olde Bar in Atlanta, Georgia on 4 August 1997, which was hosted by Atlanta alternative rock radio station 99X. 99X later included it as a track on their 99X Live X IV "Home" CD. A July 1997 performance at the Phoenix Festival was released in 2021 on Look at the Moon! (Live Phoenix Festival 97).

== Versions and remixes ==
Title	Mix and additional production	Duration
Album Version	Mark Plati	6:50
Edit	Mark Plati	4:01
Moby Mix 1	Moby	7:31
Moby Mix 2	Moby	5:25
House Mix	Moby	6:00
This One's Not Dead Yet Remix	Danny Saber	6:28
Vigor Mortis Remix	Danny Saber	6:29

== Singles ==
- 2-track CD
1. "Dead Man Walking (edit)" – 4:01
2. "Dead Man Walking (Album version)" – 6:50

Released 21 March 1997 in the Netherlands by BMG.

- Arista / 74321 47480 2 (EU)
1. "Dead Man Walking (Moby mix)" – 7:31
2. "Dead Man Walking (Album version)" – 6:50
3. "I'm Deranged (Jungle mix)" – 7:00

Released 21 March 1997 in the Netherlands by BMG.

- CD: Arista / 74321 47614 2 (EU)
1. "Dead Man Walking (Moby mix)" – 7:31
2. "Dead Man Walking (House mix)" – 6:00
3. "Dead Man Walking (This One's Not Dead Yet Remix)" – 6:28
4. "Dead Man Walking (Vigor Mortis Remix)" – 6:29

Released 24 March 1997 in the Netherlands by BMG.

- CD: RCA / 74321 47584 2 (UK)
1. "Dead Man Walking (Single edit)" – 4:01
2. "I'm Deranged (Jungle mix)" – 7:00
3. "The Hearts Filthy Lesson (Good Karma mix)" – 5:00

Released 14 April 1997 in UK by RCA and BMG.

- CD: RCA / 74321 47585 2 (UK)
1. "Dead Man Walking (Album version)" – 6:50
2. "Dead Man Walking (Moby mix 1)" – 7:31
3. "Dead Man Walking (House mix)" – 6:00
4. "Dead Man Walking (This One's Not Dead Yet Remix)" – 6:28

Released 14 April 1997 in UK by RCA and BMG.

- CD: Arista / 74321 47614 2 (Australia)
1. "Dead Man Walking (Single edit)" – 4:01
2. "Dead Man Walking (Moby mix 1)" – 7:31
3. "Dead Man Walking (House mix)" – 6:00
4. "Dead Man Walking (This One's Not Dead Yet Remix)" – 6:28
5. "Dead Man Walking (Vigor Mortis Remix)" – 6:29

Released 28 April 1997 in Australia by BMG.

- Arista / BVCA-8845 (Japan)
1. "Dead Man Walking (Single edit)" – 4:01
2. "Dead Man Walking (House mix)" – 6:00
3. "Dead Man Walking (This One's Not Dead Yet Remix)" – 6:28
4. "I'm Deranged (Jungle mix)" – 7:00

Released May 1997 in Japan.

- UK 12" vinyl version
1. "Dead Man Walking (House mix)" – 6:00
2. "Dead Man Walking (Vigor Mortis Remix)" – 6:29
3. "Telling Lies (Paradox mix)"
- Italian 12" vinyl version
1. "Dead Man Walking (Moby mix 1)" – 7:31
2. "Dead Man Walking (House mix)" – 6:00
3. "Dead Man Walking (This One's Not Dead Yet Remix)" – 6:28
4. "Dead Man Walking (Vigor Mortis Remix)" – 6:29

At least six additional promo singles were released.

== Personnel ==
- David Bowie – production, writing credits, vocals, sampling
- Gail Ann Dorsey – bass guitar, backing vocals
- Zachary Alford – drums
- Mike Garson – keyboards, piano
- Mark Plati – drum loops, electronic percussion, production, programming, samples
- Reeves Gabrels – production, writing credits, programming, guitar, vocals

== Charts ==
Chart (1997)	Peak positions
UK Singles (OCC)	32

== Other releases and use in other media ==
- It was featured in the 1997 film The Saint.
- Two Moby mixes were released on the bonus disc of the 2004 Digibook Expanded Edition of Earthling.
- "Dead Man Walking" was used as introduction for Lo Que Queda del Día, a late-afternoon news programme from Chilean Radio Cooperativa. It was also included in the soundtrack to The Saint.
- Used as theme music for early episodes of MTV's Making the Video.
