= Zack Alford =

American drummer

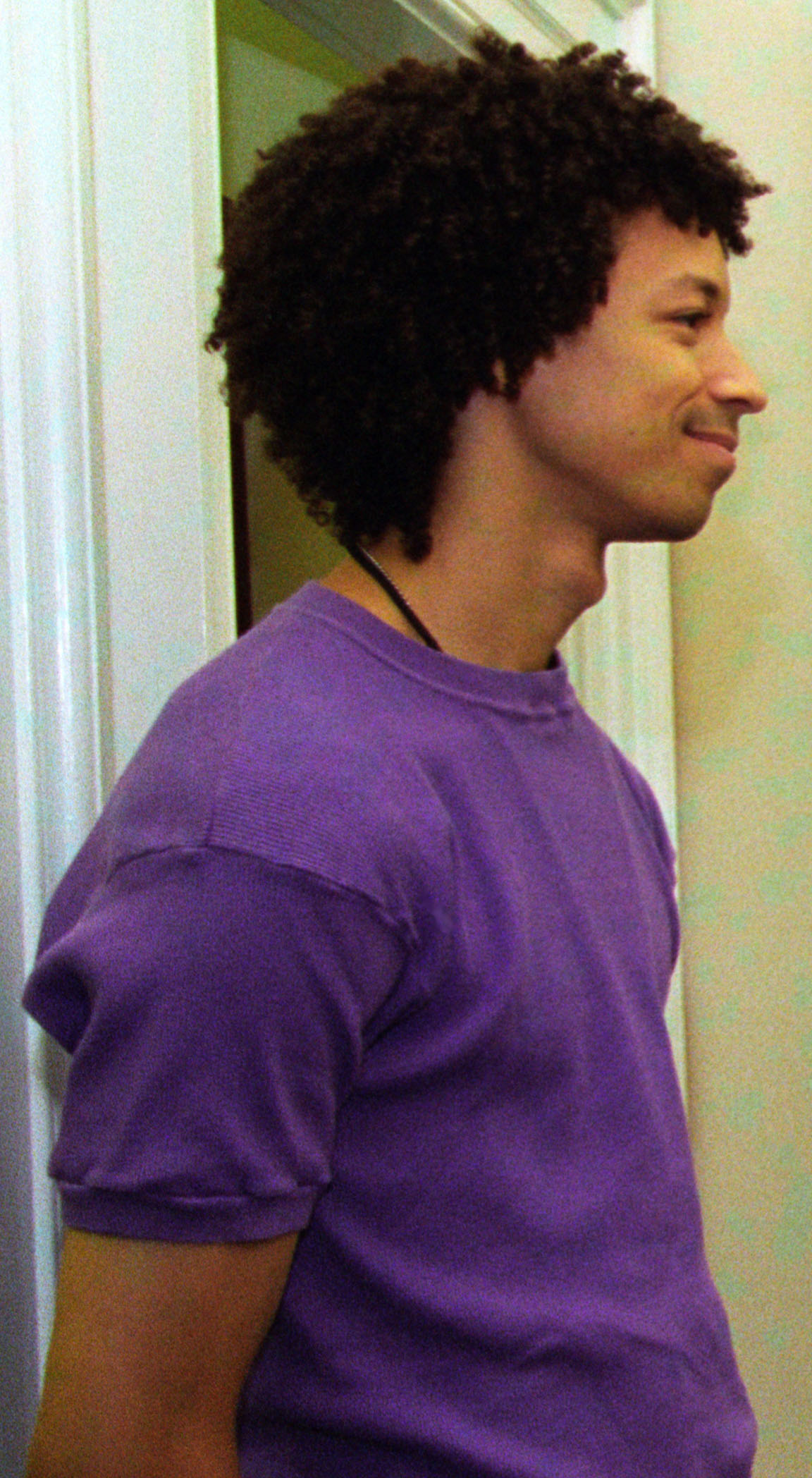
- Alford in 1995

Background information
- Born: New York City, U.S.
- Occupation: Drummer
- Member of: The Psychedelic Furs
- Website: zackalfordofficial.com

Zack Alford is an American drummer. He is known for working with singer David Bowie intermittently from the 1990s to Bowie's 2013 albums The Next Day and The Next Day Extra.

Alford performed live drums and percussion on three Bowie tours: Outside Tour (September 1995 – February 1996), Outside Summer Festivals Tour (June 1996 – July 1996), and Earthling Tour (June 1997 – November 1997).
