= Life on Mars? =

1971 song by David Bowie

- 1973 UK single

Single by David Bowie

from the album Hunky Dory
- B-side: "The Man Who Sold the World"
- Released: 22 June 1973
- Recorded: 6 August 1971
- Studio: Trident, London
- Genre: Glam rock
- Length: 3:48
- Label: RCA
- Songwriter: David Bowie
- Producers: David Bowie; Ken Scott

David Bowie singles chronology
"Let's Spend the Night Together" (1973)	"Life on Mars?" (1973)	"Sorrow" (1973)

Music video
- "Life On Mars?" on YouTube

"Life on Mars?" is a song by the English musician David Bowie, first released on his 1971 album Hunky Dory. Conceived as a parody of Frank Sinatra's 1969 song "My Way", "Life on Mars?" was recorded on 6 August 1971 at Trident Studios in London, and was co-produced by Bowie and Ken Scott. The track features piano by the keyboardist Rick Wakeman and a string arrangement by the guitarist Mick Ronson. "Life on Mars?" is primarily a glam rock ballad, with elements of cabaret and art rock. The lyrics are about a girl who goes to a cinema to escape reality, and include surreal images that reflect optimism and the effects of Hollywood.

In June 1973, at the height of Bowie's fame as Ziggy Stardust, RCA Records issued "Life on Mars?" as a single in the United Kingdom, where it peaked at number three. To promote the single, Mick Rock filmed a video that shows Bowie in make-up and a turquoise suit singing the song against a white backdrop. Bowie frequently performed "Life on Mars?" during his concerts, and the track has appeared on numerous compilation albums.

Commentators generally consider "Life on Mars?" to be one of Bowie's finest songs; some have called it one of the greatest songs of all time. Critics have praised Bowie's vocal performance and the string arrangement. The song has appeared in films and television programmes, and the British television series Life on Mars was named after it. Artists including Barbra Streisand, and Nine Inch Nails members Trent Reznor and Atticus Ross, have recorded cover versions of the song; and following Bowie's death in 2016, "Life on Mars?" was frequently chosen as a tribute to the artist in live performances and cover versions. That year, a "stripped down" version of the song, remixed by Scott, was released, along with a reedited version of the promotional video including an extended outro.

== Background and writing ==
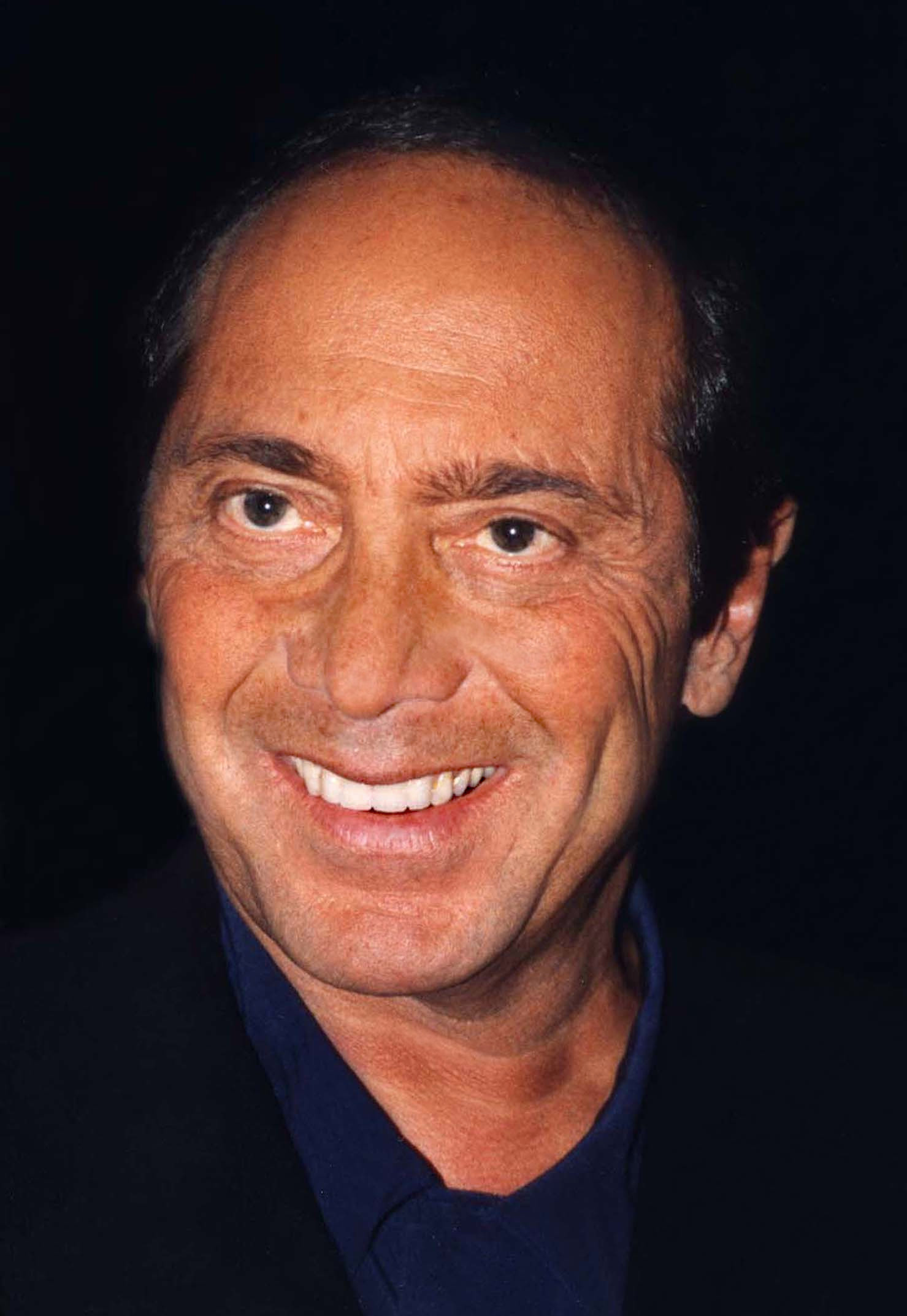
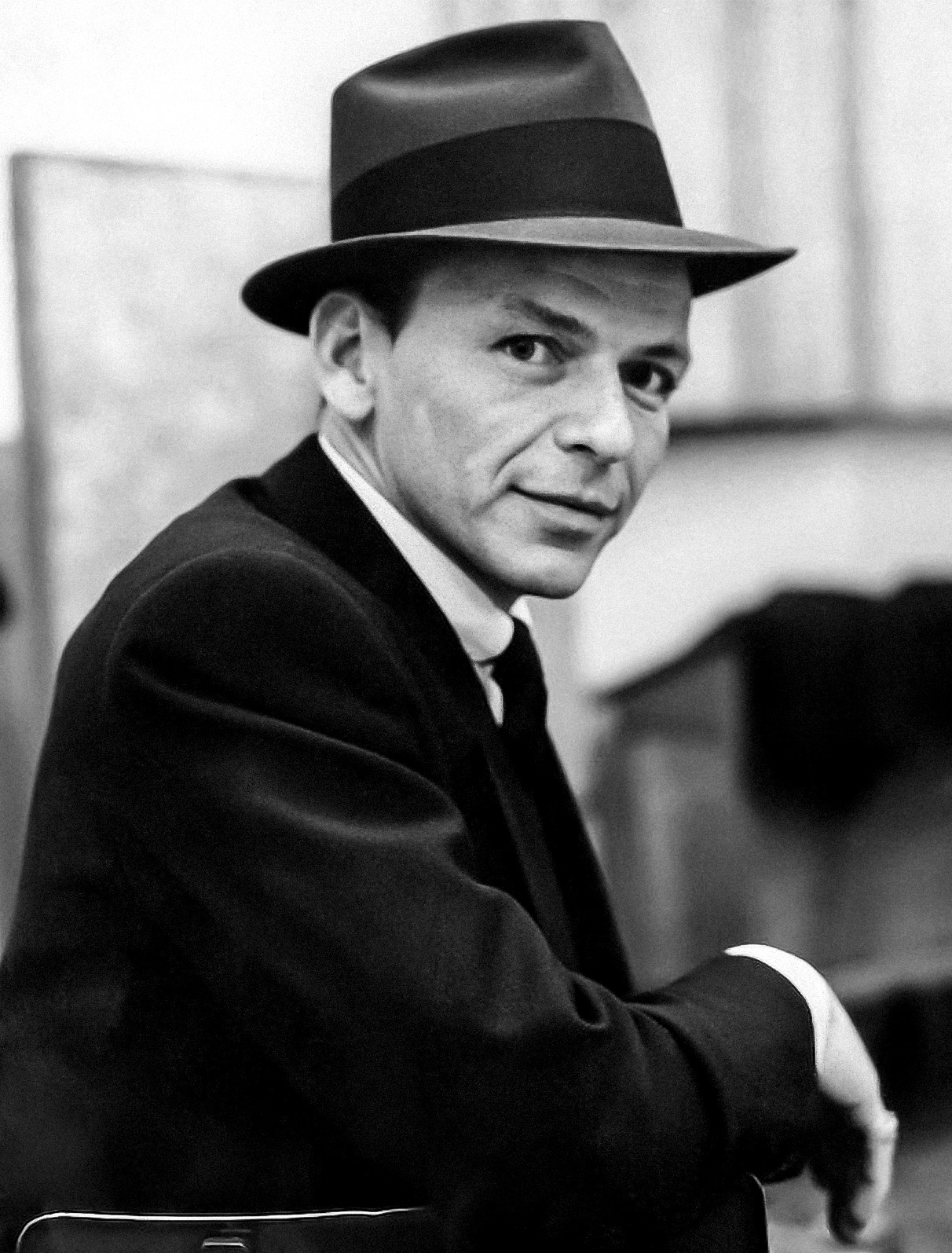
"Life on Mars?" was written as a parody of "My Way", featuring English lyrics by Paul Anka (left, 1995) and made famous by Frank Sinatra (right, 1957).

In early 1968, David Bowie was hired by his music publisher David Platz to write English lyrics for the 1967 French song "Comme d'habitude", but his version, titled "Even a Fool Learns to Love", was rejected by the song's French publishers due to Bowie's obscurity. Soon after, the songwriter Paul Anka bought the rights to "Comme d'habitude" and rewrote it as "My Way", which was made famous by the singer Frank Sinatra in 1969. The success of "My Way" prompted Bowie to write "Life on Mars?" as a parody of Sinatra's recording. He told Michael Parkinson in a 2002 interview: "That really made me angry for so long—for about a year ... eventually I thought, 'I can write something as big as that, and I'll write one that sounds a bit like it'." Bowie believed using "Comme d'habitude"/"My Way" as a basis was not "theft" but "a statement of rightful ownership". He acknowledged "My Way"'s influence in the liner notes for Hunky Dory (1971), which state that "Life on Mars?" was "inspired by Frankie".

In the liner notes for the 2008 compilation iSelect, Bowie wrote that he began humming the melody in a park in Beckenham, Kent; after returning home to Haddon Hall, he wrote the rest of the song that afternoon on piano. Haddon Hall, an Edwardian mansion converted to a block of flats, served as a communal residence for Bowie, Mick Ronson and Tony Visconti starting in 1970. It was in this atmospheric setting, described by one visitor as having an ambiance "like Dracula's living room", that Bowie composed over three dozen songs, including many that would appear on Hunky Dory and its follow-up The Rise and Fall of Ziggy Stardust and the Spiders from Mars (1972). One Melody Maker reviewer said that "Life on Mars?" was written after "a brief and painful affair" with the actress Hermione Farthingale. While on tour in 1990, Bowie introduced the song by saying, "You fall in love, you write a love song. This is a love song." Bowie's original handwritten lyrics were vastly different from the finished recording, aside from the chorus; they were more akin to the tone of Hunky Dory's other Nietzsche-inspired songs: "There's a shoulder-rock movement and the trembling starts / And a great Lord signs in vain / What can you buy when there's no-one to tell you / What a bargain you made ..."

== Recording ==
=== Early demo ===
Bowie recorded a solo demo of "Life on Mars?" in June 1971 at Radio Luxembourg studios in London. This early demo contains only the first verse and chorus, and several lyrical variations from the finished track, including "It's a simple but small affair"; "Her mother is yelling no, and her father has asked her to go"; and "It's a time for the lawman beating up the wrong guy." The demo was later released as part of the 2022 box set Divine Symmetry: The Journey to Hunky Dory. In the liner notes, Tris Penna observes that Bowie's newly discovered method of composing on piano enabled him to develop "a far more ambitious musical palette". According to the biographer Marc Spitz, Bowie's demos of "Life on Mars?", "Oh! You Pretty Things" and "Andy Warhol" around this time inspired Bowie's new manager, Tony Defries, to secure him a new recording contract, eventually signing him to RCA Records.

=== Studio version ===
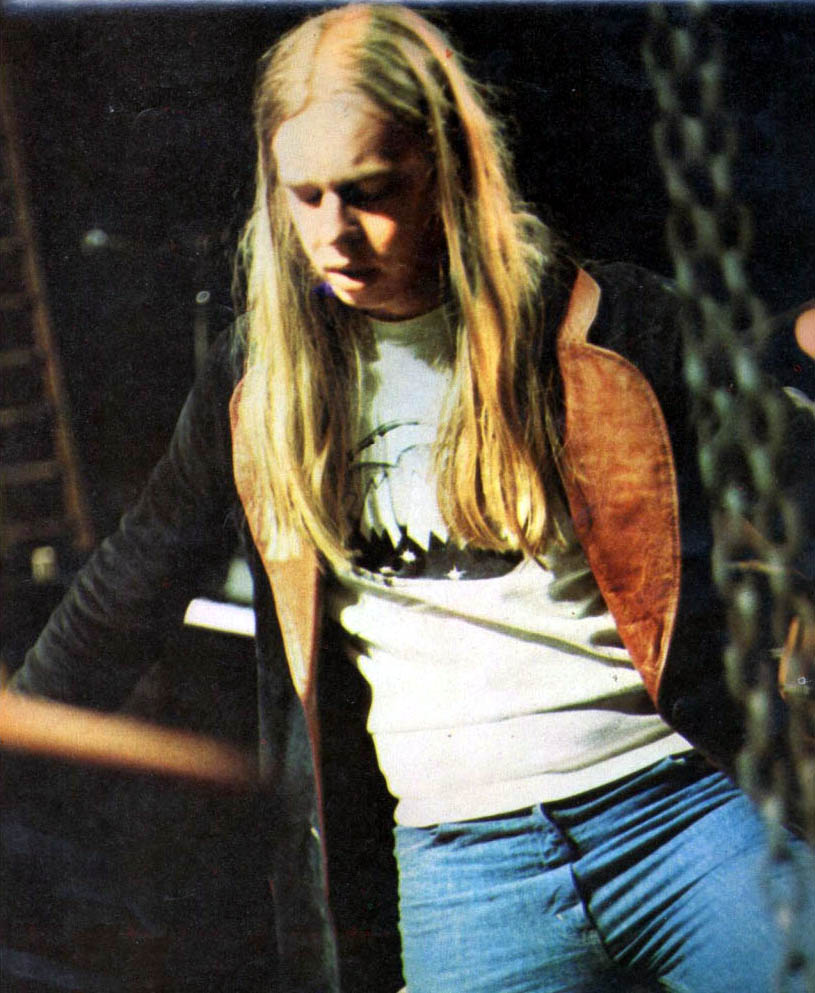
"Life on Mars?" features prominent piano playing by Rick Wakeman (pictured in 1975).

Work on Hunky Dory began at London's Trident Studios in June 1971. "Life on Mars?" was recorded on 6 August, the final day of the sessions. (Note: The final version of "Song for Bob Dylan" was also recorded on this day.) According to the biographer Chris O'Leary, Bowie and co-producer Ken Scott considered the track to be "the Big One", and saved it for the end of the sessions. The keyboardist, session musician and Strawbs member Rick Wakeman, played piano on the track. (Note: Wakeman had played previously Mellotron on Bowie's 1969 self-titled album.) (Note: Wakeman played the same 1898 Bechstein piano that was used by the Beatles for "Hey Jude" (1968), and later by Queen for "Bohemian Rhapsody" (1975).) In 1995, Wakeman said he met with Bowie in late June 1971 at Haddon Hall, where he heard demos of "Changes" and "Life on Mars?" in "their raw brilliance", calling them "the finest selection of songs I have ever heard in one sitting in my entire life [...] I couldn't wait to get into the studio and record them". In 2016, Wakeman recalled that after leaving the studio and meeting up with a group of friends in a pub, he noted that he had "just played on the best song that I'd ever had the privilege to work on".

Along with Wakeman on piano, the backing band consisted of Mick Ronson on guitar, Trevor Bolder on bass and Mick Woodmansey on drums. Ronson also composed the song's string arrangement, his first time doing so. Woodmansey recalled that Ronson's inexperience initially clashed with the more professional BBC Symphony Orchestra players: "They were good players, but it was impossible to build any sort of rapport with them because we inhabited such different worlds." Ronson was nervous but took charge, capturing two takes before the string section leader requested a third take, which appears on the final song. In 2016, Woodmansey told NME that "Life on Mars?" was the first time he realised the "calibre" of Bowie's songwriting, saying, "It had just gone to another level." In his 2017 book Spider from Mars: My Life with Bowie, Woodmansey called "Life on Mars?" the "highlight" of his recording career with Bowie and the track he's "most proud of". Bowie recorded his vocal performance in one take. Scott called him "unique" and "the only singer I ever worked with where virtually every take was a master".

== Composition ==
=== Music ===
The biographer David Buckley describes "Life on Mars?" as a "soaring, cinematic ballad". The song has been classified as glam rock by Gold Radio and Uncut, and as rock and roll and music hall by Pitchfork; while Michael Gallucci of Ultimate Classic Rock said the melody "bridges cabaret and art rock". "Life on Mars?" has a complex structure; the verses are primarily in the key of F major but chords change throughout, including C7 ("told her to go"), F ("but her friend"), and later on, C9 to A♭ ("lived it ten times"). The pre-chorus sections range from F major to B♭ major, the dominant key throughout the choruses; Bolder's bassline has a rising chromatic scale of E♭—E—F—G♭. Bowie delivers his vocals passionately during the choruses and almost nasally in the verses.

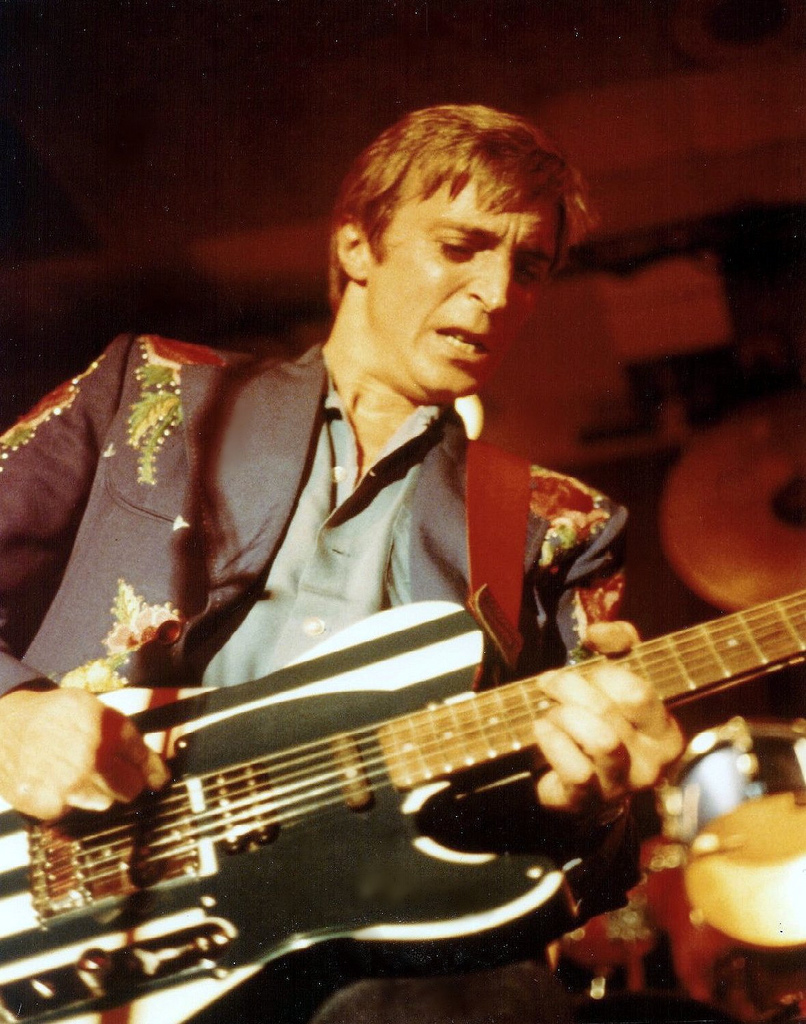
The song's string arrangement was created by Mick Ronson (pictured in 1981), who also played guitar.

Ronson based his string arrangement on the bassline Bolder worked on during rehearsals for the track. The other instruments act as a counterpoint to the strings during the chorus: according to O'Leary, Woodmansey plays a "snare-medium tom fill to echo a descending violin line", while Wakeman adds "dancing" replies on piano. Ronson plays recorder at the second verse's "Ibiza" line. Woodmansey recalled approaching his drum part as "John Bonham plays classical music". Bowie noted Wakeman "embellished the piano part" of his original melody and Ronson "created one of his first and best string parts" for the song. The author Peter Doggett describes Ronson's string arrangement as "gargantuan", and Christopher Sandford said that Hunky Dory would be best remembered for the "lush, orchestral arrangement" of "Life on Mars?"

Towards the song's end, Ronson performs a short, "vibrato-saturated" guitar solo that was recorded in one take. The strings then play "grand sweeps" before a climactic tom-roll, which several biographers compare to the tone poem Also sprach Zarathustra, which was used as the main theme of the film 2001: A Space Odyssey (1968). (Note: See sources for specific attribution: Doggett and O'Leary made comparisons to the timpani from the "main theme" of 2001, while Pegg and Sandford compared it to Also sprach Zarathustra. According to David Cheal of the Financial Times, Also sprach Zarathustra was used as the main theme for 2001.) After a false ending, Wakeman's piano plays the chorus melody "off in the distance", during which a telephone's ring and studio chatter are audible. According to Pegg, the telephone bell rang during an earlier, scrapped take that was still present at the end of the tape; Bowie decided to keep it for the final mix. Ken Scott explained that Ronson became annoyed and audibly cursed during the prior take when the telephone rang, and so in the final mix Scott quickly faded out the earlier take at that point.

=== Lyrics ===
The chorus of "Life on Mars?"
The chorus of "Life on Mars?" features passionate vocals from Bowie and growing intensity, with the instruments acting in tandem with each other and the vocals.

According to BBC Radio 2, "Life on Mars?" has "one of the strangest lyrics ever", consisting of a "slew of surreal images" like a Salvador Dalí painting. Spitz said that the song has a theme of optimism, while Robert Hilburn of the Los Angeles Times believed that there was "a sense of helplessness" to it. In the song, a "girl with mousy hair" visits a cinema to escape from reality. Sandford writes that it "sets up a complex parallel world in which the cinema becomes life". After the girl becomes "hooked to the silver screen", Bowie uses an array of images that are typical of films, naming Mickey Mouse, John Lennon, "Rule, Britannia!", Ibiza and the Norfolk Broads.

At the time of Hunky Dory's release, Bowie summed up "Life on Mars?" as, "A sensitive young girl's reaction to the media." In 1997, he said, "I think she finds herself disappointed with reality ... that although she's living in the doldrums of reality, she's being told that there's a far greater life somewhere, and she's bitterly disappointed that she doesn't have access to it." A key motif throughout the song is Hollywood, which Doggett describes as "a manufacturer of dreams and stars that have become stale with repetition". This is evident in the line "the film is a saddening bore—she's lived it ten times or more", which Sandford calls "a neat, if well-worn trick, blurring the art-life divide". The Hollywood influence is also present in the line "look at those cavemen go", which is borrowed from the Hollywood Argyles' 1960 song "Alley Oop".

The identity of the "girl with the mousy hair" has been debated, with some claiming the girl is Farthingale. Pegg, however, states that no evidence supports this claim. Farthingale has also rejected this theory, telling Pegg: "I don't actually have mousy hair ... I wasn't a person who lived at home with my parents, and I didn't live a fantasy life in films. Nothing about me fits into any of the words."

=== Title ===
Despite the title's relation to Bowie's Ziggy Stardust character, "Life on Mars?" has no connection with the planet Mars; the title is a reference to the intense media coverage of the contemporaneous race to reach the planet between the United States and the Soviet Union. Doggett states the media interest inspired headlines around the world that asked, "Is there life on Mars?" According to the music scholar James E. Perone, the science fiction-influenced character of Ziggy Stardust and his backing band the Spiders from Mars originated in the "fleeting image" of "Life on Mars?" and the "androgynous outcast" who is portrayed in Bowie's album The Man Who Sold the World (1970).

== Release ==
RCA Records released Hunky Dory in the UK on 17 December 1971, (Note: Some sources give the release date as 17 November 1971 in the UK and 4 December in the US. According to the biographer Chris O'Leary, the US date was before the UK one, although he questions Billboard's reported date of Saturday, 4 December. He does, however, clarify the UK date as 17 December.) with "Life on Mars?" as the fourth track on side one, between "Eight Line Poem" and "Kooks". Eighteen months later, at the height of Bowie's fame as Ziggy Stardust, RCA released "Life on Mars?" as a single in the UK on 22 June 1973, with the 1970 track "The Man Who Sold the World" as the B-side. The song was reportedly released as a single due to its positive audience reception on the Ziggy Stardust Tour; RCA had previously reissued "Space Oddity" (1969) as a single in the US in December 1972.

=== Music video ===
Shortly before its release as a single, a promotional video for "Life on Mars?" was filmed at Blandford West Ten Studio in Ladbroke Grove, West London, on 13 June 1973. The video was directed and filmed by the photographer Mick Rock, who had previously directed the videos for "John, I'm Only Dancing" and "The Jean Genie" (both 1972). In the video for "Life on Mars?", Bowie, donning heavy make-up by the artist Pierre Laroche and a turquoise suit that was designed by Freddie Buretti, (Note: Laroche was Bowie's make-up artist for the covers of Aladdin Sane and Pin Ups (both 1973), as well as the 1973 leg of the Ziggy Stardust Tour. Burretti was an openly gay dress designer whom Bowie chose as the frontman for the band Arnold Corns in early 1971.) mimes to the song against a white backdrop. According to Rock, the video "wasn't so much an idea as a moment in time", saying he "wanted to do something that looked a little bit like a painting". Bowie described the final result as having a "strange, floaty, pop-art effect". Rock later said he had no discussion with Bowie about a concept due to having to film the video on short notice, explaining that "I somehow got hold of a completely white studio and that dictated the concept – it was as simple as that."

Bowie transferred the rights to the four videos Rock directed for him in the late 1990s. At the request of Parlophone, Rock remastered and reedited the "Life on Mars?" video in 2016 to promote the release of the Legacy (The Very Best of David Bowie) compilation. The reedited video features an extended outro sequence, which Rock felt was "a little gift" for Bowie's fans. A 4K remaster was released in 2023, with updated colour correction that removes the original's oversaturation. In 2022, to celebrate the 50th anniversary of Hunky Dory, Mattel released a Barbie doll donning a replica of Bowie's suit from the "Life on Mars?" video.

=== Subsequent releases ===
"Life on Mars?" has been released on a variety of compilation albums, including The Best of Bowie (1980) featuring an alternative edit; Changesbowie (EMI, 1990); The Singles Collection (1993); The Best of David Bowie 1969/1974 (1997); Best of Bowie (2002); and iSelect (2008). A 2003 remix of the track by co-producer Ken Scott was included on some versions of the compilation album Nothing Has Changed (2014). In 2015, the song was remastered, with the rest of Hunky Dory, for release on the box set Five Years (1969–1973). Following Bowie's death in 2016, a new mix of "Life on Mars?" by Scott was released for the Legacy compilation and also as a digital single. The 2016 remix is "stripped down", and has only strings, piano and vocals.

The 2022 multi-disc box set Divine Symmetry: The Journey to Hunky Dory, which comprises home demos, BBC radio sessions, alternate mixes, and other live and studio recordings from 1971, includes several versions of "Life on Mars?": the June 1971 demo, the 2015 remaster of the August 1971 master, the 2016 remix (in stereo and, for the first time, 5.1 surround sound), and a 2021 mix by Scott, allowing the ending with the telephone bell and Ronson's cursing to be heard fully.

== Critical reception ==
['Life on Mars?'] speaks to the longing for something more exciting that everyone has, the kind of universal theme that, when married to a sweeping melody and executed with style ... will remain the stuff of best-of lists and subpar covers.

— Marc Spitz, Bowie: A Biography

Reviewers have generally considered "Life on Mars?" one of the best tracks on Hunky Dory. According to Gallucci, "Life on Mars?" is one of the tracks that "painted a portrait of an artist who couldn't be labelled because he himself had little idea of who or what he was at the time". Dave Thompson of AllMusic describes it as "a masterpiece of fragmented thought and displaced vision", and one of Bowie's "most astonishing" songs. Other reviewers have classified the track as giving a strong representation of Bowie's growth as a songwriter. Chris Karman of Treble particularly highlighted Ronson's string arrangement, believing the track was Bowie's high point of the decade. On the eve of the song's 50th anniversary in 2021, Matt Neal of ABC News wrote, "the song stands as an epitaph to [a] remarkable musician". The same year, Mojo magazine's Tom Doyle argued that "Life on Mars?" epitomises what makes Bowie unique as an artist.

Reviewers and commentators have praised "Life on Mars?" as one of Bowie's finest songs. Pegg calls it Bowie's "1971 masterpiece", while O'Leary refers to it as "the Citizen Kane [1941] of Bowie's songs: young man's bravura". Doggett and Rob Sheffield consider Bowie's vocal performance on the song to be one of his best, while Spitz describes it as "one of the best pop songs ever written". Publications including Digital Spy, Mojo and Consequence of Sound have also considered "Life on Mars?" Bowie's greatest song. Digital Spy stated it has "perhaps become [Bowie's] signature song—filled with surreal cut-up lyrics ..., it married vivid imagery with a tender, heartbreaking melody". The author Benoît Clerc calls it one of the "great pop songs of the twentieth century". In 2020, U2's singer Bono included the song on a list of 60 songs that saved his life. In a letter to Bowie's son Duncan, Bono explained that when he first heard the song at 13 years old, "I wasn't thinking about the question mark in the title [...] The song was answering a much more important question when I was 13... Is there intelligent life on Earth? It was proof as far as I'm concerned."

In 2008, Uncut magazine ranked "Life on Mars?" number nine in a list of Bowie's 30 best songs. Following Bowie's death in 2016, Rolling Stone named "Life on Mars?" one of the 30 most-essential songs of Bowie's catalogue. In 2018, readers of NME voted the song as Bowie's second-best track behind "All the Young Dudes", and the publication's staff placed it seventh a list of Bowie's 40 best songs. In The Guardian, Alexis Petridis placed it fourth in his list of Bowie's 50 greatest songs, calling it a "no-further-questions masterpiece". In 2021, staff of The Telegraph listed "Life on Mars?" as one of Bowie's 20 essential songs in 2021. In a list ranking every Bowie single, Ultimate Classic Rock placed "Life on Mars?" at number six. In 2020, Tom Eames of British radio station Smooth Radio listed it as Bowie's second-greatest song behind "'Heroes'" (1977).

"Life on Mars?" has appeared on numerous best-of lists. Neil McCormick, chief rock critic of The Telegraph, has ranked "Life on Mars?" the greatest song of all time in two different lists compiling the 100 Greatest Songs of All Time.

In 2007, Q magazine ranked "Life on Mars?" third in a list compiling the "10 most perfect songs ever" behind Jeff Buckley's version of Leonard Cohen's "Hallelujah" (1994) and the Beatles' "Strawberry Fields Forever" (1967). "Life on Mars?" has also appeared in lists of the best songs of the 1970s; it was ranked at number one by Pitchfork and Treble, and number 25 by NME. In 2021, Rolling Stone ranked it number 105 on its list of the 500 Greatest Songs of All Time, calling it a "surrealistic tale about the limits of escapism".

== Commercial performance ==
Upon release as a single, "Life on Mars?" entered the UK singles chart at number 21, peaking at number three in mid-July behind "Welcome Home" by Peters and Lee and "I'm the Leader of the Gang (I Am)" by Gary Glitter. "Life on Mars?" remained on the chart for thirteen weeks. In West Germany, the song peaked at number 39 on the Official German Charts. In the wake of the massive commercial success of Bowie's 1983 album Let's Dance, "Life on Mars?" returned to the UK chart for one week, peaking at number 97.

In April 2007, over 30 years after its initial release, "Life on Mars?" re-entered the UK singles chart at number 55, largely because of its use in the British television series Life on Mars. Two years later, it charted at number 67 on the Australian ARIA charts. Following Bowie's death in 2016, "Life on Mars?" charted around the world, reaching the top five in France and Ireland. In the US, it peaked at number seven and twelve on Billboard's Euro Digital Song Sales and Hot Rock & Alternative Songs charts, respectively. The song also charted in Finland (12), Italy (33), Belgium Wallonia (40), Sweden (44), Switzerland (48), Portugal (63) and the Netherlands (95).

== Live performances ==
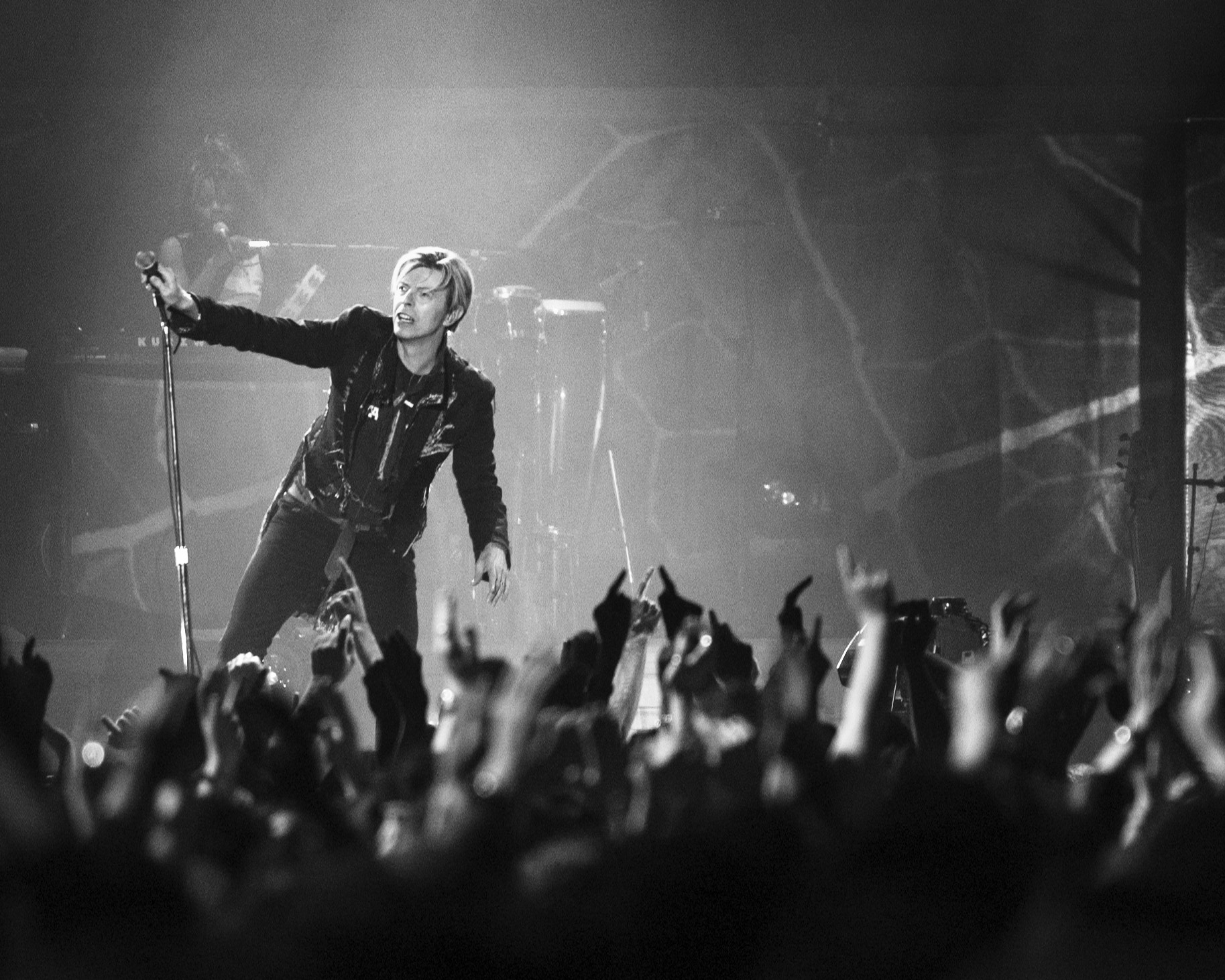
Bowie (pictured in 2003) performed "Life on Mars?" frequently on tour, recordings of which have appeared on numerous live albums.

Bowie frequently performed "Life on Mars?" during his concert tours. Live recordings from the Ziggy Stardust Tour (1972–1973) have been released on the 30th-anniversary bonus disc of Aladdin Sane (2003) and on the bootleg album Santa Monica '72 (1994), which received an official release as Live Santa Monica '72 in 2008. On the 1973 leg of the Ziggy Stardust Tour, the song was performed in a medley with "Quicksand" and "Memory of a Free Festival". Additionally, a live performance was recorded during the 1976 Isolar Tour on 23 March 1976 as part of a medley with "Five Years"; this recording was included on the album Live Nassau Coliseum '76, which was released as part of the 2010 reissues of Station to Station, in the 2016 box set Who Can I Be Now? (1974–1976), and as a stand-alone album in 2017. Bowie performed the song on the American television programme The Tonight Show Starring Johnny Carson on 5 September 1980.

A performance from the Serious Moonlight Tour, recorded on 12 September 1983, was released on Bowie's album Serious Moonlight (Live '83), which was initially released as part of the 2018 box set Loving the Alien (1983–1988) and separately the following year; the filmed performance also appears on the concert video Serious Moonlight (1984). After the Sound+Vision Tour in 1990, Bowie did not perform "Life on Mars?" until 23 August 1999, when he sang it in a recorded-for-television performance that was released on VH1 Storytellers (2009). The song was a mainstay on Bowie's Hours, 2000 and Heathen tours. Bowie performed "Life on Mars?" at the Glastonbury Festival on 25 June 2000; this performance was released in 2018 on the album Glastonbury 2000. A performance of the song from the Montreux Jazz Festival on 18 July 2002 was released on the box set I Can't Give Everything Away (2002–2016) in 2025, and a November 2003 performance from Bowie's A Reality Tour was released on the DVD of the tour in 2004 and on the live album A Reality Tour in 2010.

Bowie's final performance of "Life on Mars?" was on 8 September 2005, when he sang it with the indie rock band Arcade Fire at Radio City Music Hall, New York City, at that year's Fashion Rocks event. Bowie was introduced by the singer Alicia Keys and was accompanied by his longtime pianist Mike Garson. A recording of this performance was released via iTunes.

== Cover versions and appearances in media ==
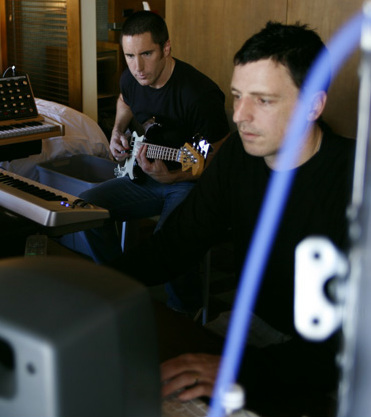
Trent Reznor (left) and Atticus Ross covered "Life on Mars?" in 2019 for the American television series Watchmen.

A multitude of artists have covered "Life on Mars?" The American singer Barbra Streisand covered the song for her 1974 album ButterFly. Bowie condemned Streisand's cover; in 1976, he said it was "bloody awful" and "atrocious". Her cover was also poorly received by Rolling Stone's Ben Gerson, who criticised her vocal performance, although Spitz called her version "fairly faithful". A 2005 easy listening version by the British group G4 was panned by Pegg in his book The Complete David Bowie, calling it "heroically gruesome". ABBA's member Anni-Frid Lyngstad recorded a Swedish version titled "Liv på Mars?" for her 1975 solo album Frida ensam. A version by the Belgian singer Jasper Steverlinck reached number one in the Belgian charts in 2003. In 2019, Nine Inch Nails members Trent Reznor and Atticus Ross covered the song on their soundtrack to the HBO television series Watchmen. The dark ambient piano cover is heard during the end credits of the episode "An Almost Religious Awe". Reznor, who was friends with Bowie, (Note: Nine Inch Nails were the opening act during Bowie's 1995 Outside Tour. Two years later, Reznor created several remixes of Bowie's track "I'm Afraid of Americans" and appeared in the song's music video.) said composing the cover was a daunting task, and that he and Ross were ultimately "very proud" of the result.

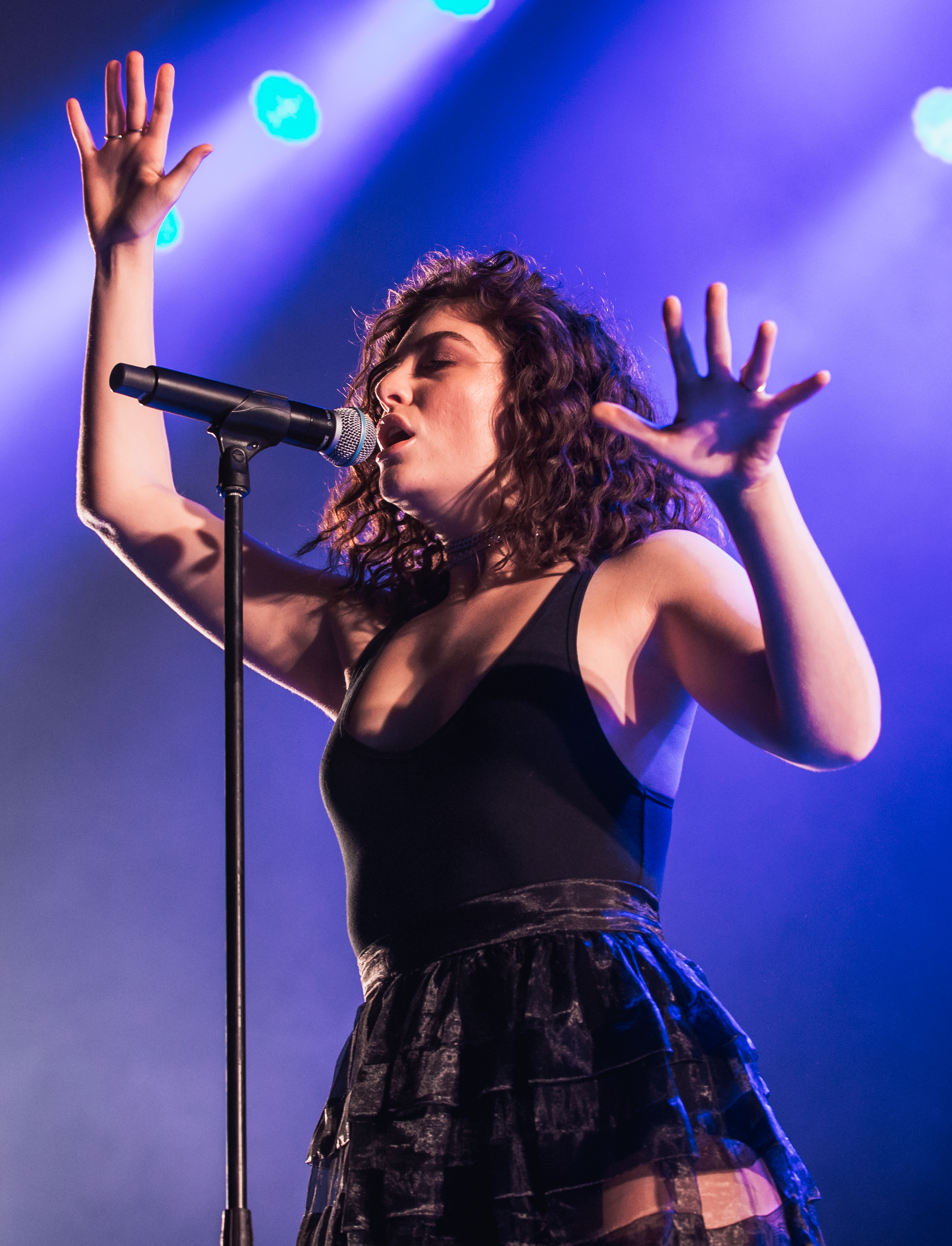
Lorde (pictured in 2017) performed "Life on Mars?" at the 2016 Brit Awards, garnering widespread acclaim.

Following Bowie's death in 2016, "Life on Mars?" was one of the most-widely selected of Bowie's songs for tribute performances. A version by Nicholas Freestone, the organ scholar at St Albans Cathedral in Hertfordshire, became a viral hit after a video of Freestone's performance was posted on Facebook and YouTube. The New Zealand singer-songwriter Lorde performed "Life on Mars?" with Bowie's final touring band at the 2016 Brit Awards in February 2016. Her cover was widely acknowledged as one of the finest tribute performances to Bowie. Later that year, the song was performed at the 2016 Royal Edinburgh Military Tattoo.

"Life on Mars?" has appeared in numerous television series. The British series Life on Mars was named after the song, which is prominently featured in the series and included on its soundtrack album. The actress Jessica Lange sang the song with a deep German accent on the fourth-season premiere of the FX television series American Horror Story: Freak Show. Lange played a character whose surname is Mars; she wears an ice-blue trouser suit and heavy matching eye shadow in her performance, echoing Bowie's video. The Doctor Who episode "The Waters of Mars" (2009) takes place on the first human base on Mars, which is named "Bowie Base One". The showrunner Russell T Davies said the base's name is a reference to "Life on Mars?"

The song has been featured in several film soundtracks. Seu Jorge recorded a Portuguese cover for the 2004 film The Life Aquatic with Steve Zissou, while Bowie's original is included on the film's soundtrack album. "Life on Mars?" also appears in Loverboy (2005) and Hunky Dory (2012), and on the soundtrack of Factory Girl (2006). The song also appears in the 2015 musical Lazarus, which was written by Bowie and the playwright Enda Walsh near the end of Bowie's life. It is sung by the character Girl, who was played by Sophia Anne Caruso in the New York and London productions. For the musical, the song's arrangement was downplayed to avoid it becoming a Broadway "showstopper". "Life on Mars?" also features in the soundtrack to the first trailer for Paul Thomas Anderson's 2021 film Licorice Pizza, and in the film itself.

"Life on Mars?" has also been used during space-related events. In 2018, the song was played on the radio of Elon Musk's Tesla Roadster, which was launched into space aboard the test flight of the Falcon Heavy rocket. A cover version by the English singer Yungblud was used at the end of NASA TV's live coverage of the landing of the Mars 2020 rover.

== Personnel ==
According to the biographers Chris O'Leary and Benoît Clerc:

- David Bowie – vocals
- Mick Ronson – electric guitars, recorders, string arrangement
- Trevor Bolder – bass guitar
- Mick Woodmansey – drums
- Rick Wakeman – piano
- BBC Symphony Orchestra – violins, violas, celli, string basses

Production

- David Bowie – producer
- Ken Scott – producer, engineer

== Charts ==
1973 weekly chart performance for "Life on Mars?"
Chart	Peak position
Ireland (IRMA)	4
Spain (Los 40 Principales)	10
UK Singles (Official Charts)	3
West Germany (GfK)	39

1983 weekly chart performance for "Life on Mars?"
Chart	Peak position
UK Singles (OCC)	97

2009 weekly chart performance for "Life on Mars?"
Chart	Peak position
Australia (ARIA)	67

2016 weekly chart performance for "Life on Mars?"
Chart	Peak position
Belgium (Ultratop 50 Wallonia)	40
Euro Digital Song Sales (Billboard)	7
Finland (Suomen virallinen lista)	12
France (SNEP)	3
Italy (FIMI)	33
Netherlands (Single Top 100)	95
Portugal (AFP)	63
UK Singles (OCC)	16
US Hot Rock & Alternative Songs (Billboard)	12
Sweden (Sverigetopplistan)	44
Switzerland (Schweizer Hitparade)	48

== Certifications ==
Sales certifications for "Life on Mars?"
Region	Certification	Certified units/sales
Denmark (IFPI Danmark)	Gold	45,000^{‡}
Italy (FIMI) sales since 2009	Platinum	100,000^{‡}
New Zealand (RMNZ)	Platinum	30,000^{‡}
Spain (Promusicae) 2015 Remastered Version	Gold	30,000^{‡}
United Kingdom (BPI) sales since 2004	2× Platinum	1,200,000^{‡}
^{‡} Sales+streaming figures based on certification alone.
