= Urban Eye =

British urban renewal organization

- Formation: 1998
- Type: Charity
- Headquarters: North Kensington, London, England
- Founder: Miles Watson
- Website: www.urbaneye.org.uk

Urban Eye (formerly Westway Project) is a London-based charity that has been regenerating run-down parts of inner city London through the use of design, architectural lighting and public art since 1998. Projects aim to reduce fear of crime and anti-social behaviour and to create a more positive identity for urban zones for the benefit of both residents and visitors alike. Where possible, projects involve local people directly in the creative process, including partnerships with schools, resident groups youth projects and disability authorities.

The charity has formed partnerships with stakeholders (Transport for London, National Highways, Landsec and Kensington Housing Trust), public and private organisations (BBC, BT Group), and local authorities (Royal Borough of Kensington & Chelsea, Westminster City Council, Suffolk County Council, London Borough of Hammersmith & Fulham) to tackle regeneration schemes in run-down sites in the city.

Urban Eye has completed projects in prominent London locations, including Portobello Road and Ladbroke Grove London Underground bridges, sections of the underside of the Westway (London) and other neglected urban sites such as pedestrian bridges and graffiti-prone buildings and utilities.

== The Acklam Bridge ==
The Acklam Bridge project was completed in 2009. It included the repainting and installation of lights along the Acklam Bridge with the goal to make the area feel safer.
