= Hunky Dory =

1971 studio album by David Bowie

- UK cover (the original US cover bears no title)

Studio album by David Bowie
- Released: 17 December 1971 (Note: Some sources give the release date as 17 November 1971 in the UK and 4 December in the US. According to Chris O'Leary, the US date was before the UK one, although he questions Billboard's reported date of Saturday, 4 December. He does, however, clarify the UK date as 17 December.)
- Recorded: 8 June – 6 August 1971
- Studio: Trident (London)
- Genres: Art pop; pop rock
- Length: 41:50
- Label: RCA Victor
- Producers: Ken Scott; David Bowie

David Bowie chronology
The Man Who Sold the World (1970)	Hunky Dory (1971)	The Rise and Fall of Ziggy Stardust and the Spiders from Mars (1972)

Singles from Hunky Dory
- 1. "Changes" / "Andy Warhol" Released: 7 January 1972; 2. "Life on Mars?" Released: 22 June 1973

Hunky Dory is the fourth studio album by the English musician David Bowie, released in the United Kingdom on 17 December 1971 through RCA Records. Following a break from touring and recording, Bowie settled down to write new songs, composing on piano rather than guitar as in earlier works. Bowie assembled Mick Ronson (guitar), Trevor Bolder (bass) and Mick Woodmansey (drums), and recorded the album in mid-1971 at Trident Studios in London. Rick Wakeman contributed piano shortly before joining Yes. Bowie co-produced the album with Ken Scott, who had engineered Bowie's previous two records.

Compared to the guitar-driven hard rock of The Man Who Sold the World, Bowie opted for a warmer, more melodic piano-based pop rock and art pop style on Hunky Dory. His lyrical concerns on the record range from the compulsive nature of artistic reinvention on "Changes" to occultism and Nietzschean philosophy on "Oh! You Pretty Things" and "Quicksand"; several songs make cultural and literary references. He was also inspired by his United States tour to write songs dedicated to three American icons: Andy Warhol, Bob Dylan and Lou Reed. The song "Kooks" was dedicated to Bowie's newborn son Duncan. The album's cover artwork, photographed in monochrome and subsequently recoloured, features Bowie in a pose inspired by actresses of the Hollywood Golden Age.

RCA offered little promotion for Hunky Dory and its lead single "Changes", wary that Bowie would transform his image shortly. Thus, the album initially sold poorly and failed to chart, despite very positive reviews from the British and American music press. After the commercial breakthrough of Bowie's Ziggy Stardust album in 1972, Hunky Dory garnered renewed interest, with sales peaking at number three on the UK Albums Chart. Retrospectively, Hunky Dory has been critically acclaimed as one of Bowie's best works, and features on several lists of the greatest albums of all time. Within the context of his career, Hunky Dory is considered the album where "Bowie starts to become Bowie", definitively discovering his voice and style.

== Background ==
After David Bowie completed his third studio album, The Man Who Sold the World, in May 1970, he became less active in both the studio and on stage. His contract with the music publisher Essex had expired and his new manager Tony Defries was facing prior contractual challenges. Bowie was also without a backing band, as the musicians on The Man Who Sold the World – including its producer and bassist Tony Visconti, the guitarist Mick Ronson and the drummer Mick Woodmansey – departed in August 1970 due to personal conflicts with the artist. After hearing a demo of Bowie's "Holy Holy", recorded in autumn 1970, Defries signed the singer to a contract with Chrysalis, but thereafter limited his work with Bowie to focus on other projects. Bowie, who was devoting himself to songwriting, turned to Chrysalis's partner Bob Grace, who loved the demo of "Holy Holy" and subsequently booked time at Radio Luxembourg's studios in London for Bowie to record his demos. "Holy Holy", recorded in November 1970 and released as a single in January 1971, was a commercial flop.

The whole Hunky Dory album reflected my newfound enthusiasm for this new continent that had been opened up to me. That was the first time a real outside situation affected me so 100 percent that it changed my way of writing and the way I look at things.

— David Bowie discussing how America impacted the album, 1999

The Man Who Sold the World was released in the United States through Mercury Records in November 1970. The album sold poorly but fared better both critically and commercially in the US than in the UK. It was played on American radio stations frequently and its "heavy rock content" increased interest in Bowie. The critical success of the album prompted Mercury to send Bowie on a promotional radio tour of the US in February 1971. The trip inspired him to write tribute songs for three American icons: the artist Andy Warhol, the singer-songwriter Bob Dylan and the rock band the Velvet Underground, more specifically their singer Lou Reed. After the tour, Bowie returned to his apartment in Haddon Hall, Beckenham, where he recorded many of his early 1970s demos, and began writing. According to his then-wife Angela, Bowie had spent time composing songs on piano rather than acoustic guitar, which would "infuse the flavour of the new album". In total, he composed over three dozen songs there, many of which appeared on Hunky Dory and its follow-up album The Rise and Fall of Ziggy Stardust and the Spiders from Mars. The first song Bowie wrote for Hunky Dory was "Oh! You Pretty Things" in January 1971. After recording its demo at Radio Luxembourg, Bowie gave the tape to Grace, who showed it to Peter Noone of Herman's Hermits. Noone decided to record his own version and release it as his debut single.

Released in April 1971, Noone's version of "Oh! You Pretty Things" was a commercial success, reaching number 12 on the UK Singles Chart. It was the first time most listeners had heard of Bowie since "Space Oddity" (1969). Noone told NME: "My view is that David Bowie is the best writer in Britain at the moment ... certainly the best since Lennon and McCartney." Following the success of the single, Defries sought to extricate Bowie from his contract with Mercury, which was set to expire in June 1971. Defries felt that Mercury had not done Bowie justice financially. Although Mercury had intended to renew it on improved terms, Defries forced the label to terminate the contract in May by threatening to deliver a low-quality album. Defries then paid off Bowie's debts to Mercury through Gem Productions, and the label surrendered its copyright on David Bowie (1969) and The Man Who Sold the World.

== Writing and recording ==
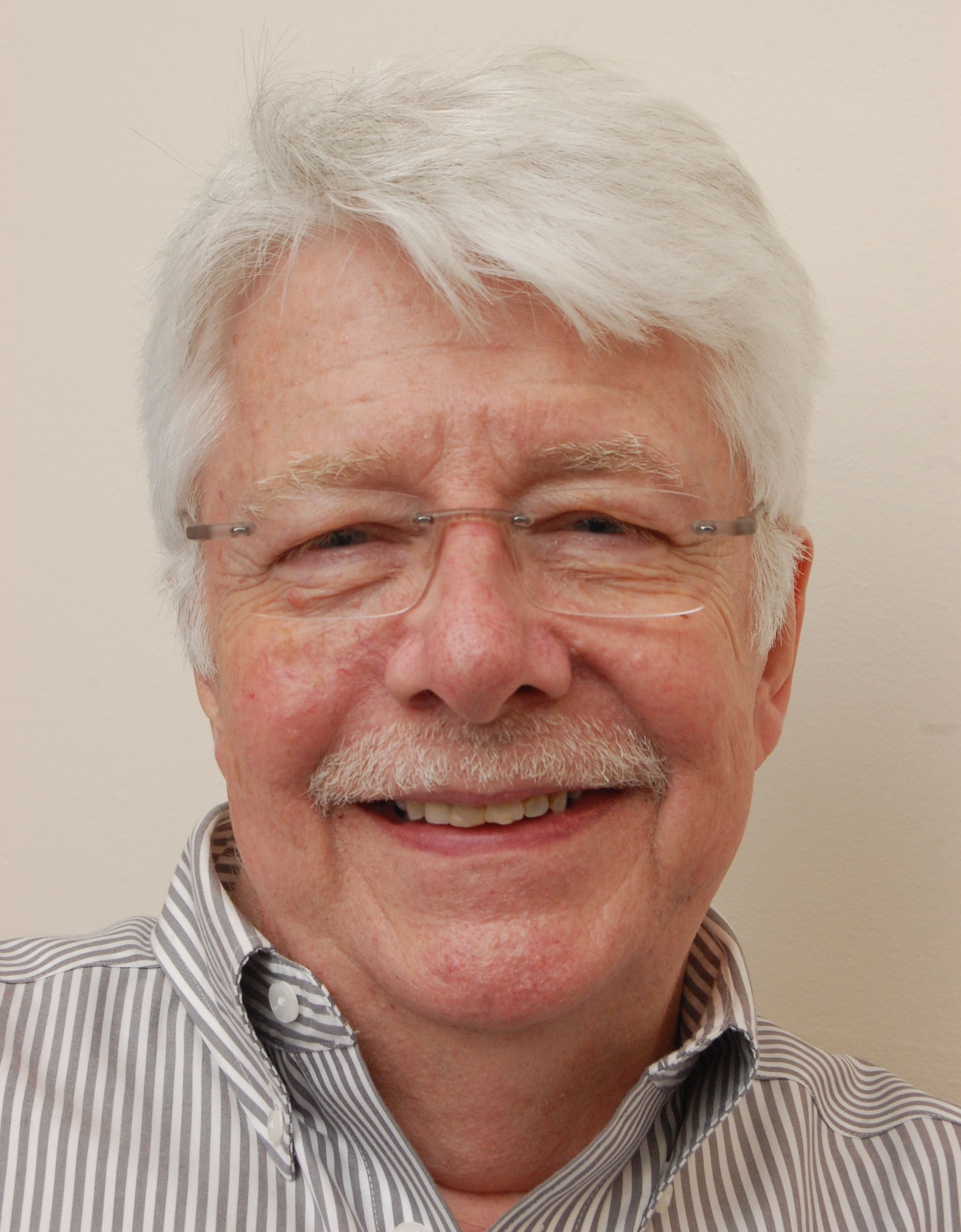
Co-producer Ken Scott in 2014

After his short-lived band Arnold Corns folded in February, Bowie returned to the studio in May 1971 to record his next album. He brought back Ronson and Woodmansey and hired Trevor Bolder, a former hairdresser and piano tuner, as a bass player to replace Visconti. After Bolder was hired, the trio grouped at Haddon Hall to rehearse some of Bowie's new material, such as the song "Andy Warhol". Bowie and his new backing trio, soon to be named the Spiders from Mars, played for the first time on 3 June on BBC DJ John Peel's radio programme In Concert. The set included debut performances of several songs Bowie had recently written such as "Queen Bitch", "Bombers", "Song for Bob Dylan" and "Andy Warhol". The title Hunky Dory was also announced at this session.

Bowie and the future Spiders officially started work on the new album at Trident Studios in London on 8 June 1971. Ken Scott, who had engineered Bowie's two previous records, was hired to co-produce alongside him. Scott accepted the position as a way to gain experience, although at the time he didn't believe Bowie would become a huge star. His debut as a producer, Scott borrowed some of the acoustic sounds of George Harrison's All Things Must Pass (1970), an album he engineered. Scott retained the role of co-producer for Bowie's next three records: Ziggy Stardust, Aladdin Sane and Pin Ups. Bowie played demos for Scott and the two picked which ones would be recorded for the album. On 8 June, the band recorded "Song for Bob Dylan", although according to Nicholas Pegg this version was scrapped and the released version was not recorded until 23 June. Scott later recalled that recording went very quickly: "Almost everything was done in one take." Discussing Bowie's vocals, Scott stated: "He was unique. [He is] the only singer I ever worked with where virtually every take was a master." Bolder described recording with Bowie for the first time as a "nerve-wracking experience": "When that red light came on in the studio it was, God, in at the deep end or what!" As a co-producer Bowie took an active interest in the album's sound and arrangements, an about-face from his generally hands-off attitude during the Man Who Sold the World sessions.

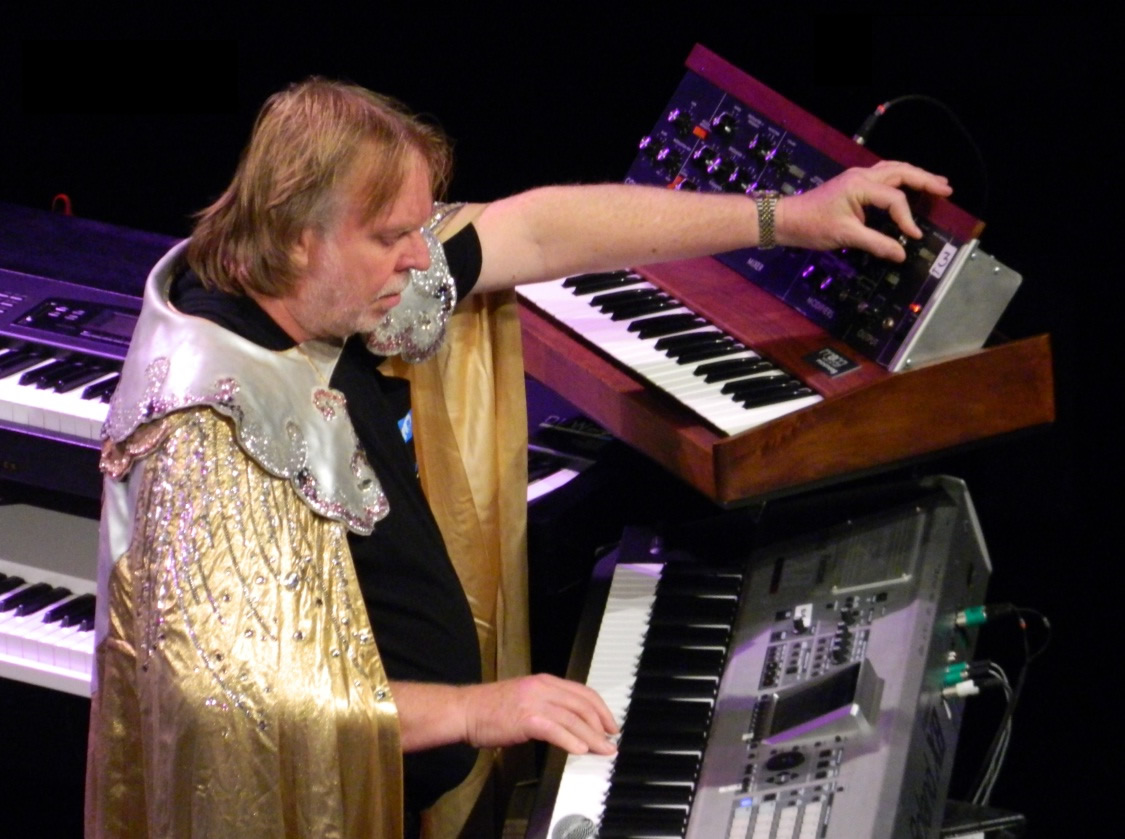
Rick Wakeman (pictured in 2012), whose piano playing greatly influenced the songs

Rick Wakeman, noted session musician and member of the Strawbs, plays piano on the album; (Note: The piano Wakeman played was the same 1898 Bechstein used by Paul McCartney for the Beatles' "Hey Jude" (1968) and later by Queen for "Bohemian Rhapsody" (1975).) he previously played Mellotron on David Bowie (1969). In 1995 he recalled that he met with Bowie in late June 1971 at Haddon Hall, where he heard demos of "Changes" and "Life on Mars?" in "their raw brilliance ... the finest selection of songs I have ever heard in one sitting in my entire life ... I couldn't wait to get into the studio and record them." According to Wakeman, the first few sessions started poorly as the band had not learned the songs. He recalled that Bowie had to halt the sessions, telling the musicians off and to come back when they knew the music. When they returned after a week, Wakeman thought "the band were hot! They were so good, and the tracks just flowed through." This story has been contested by other band members, including Bolder, who told the biographer Kevin Cann: "[That's] rubbish. David would never have told the band off in the studio. Especially as Mick and Woody had already left him once, and everyone was now getting on. The band would not have survived that – it definitely didn't happen." Scott contended: "I definitely don't remember that, and it's not something I would forget. I would definitely dispute that one."

On 9 July, with Wakeman in the line-up, Bowie and the band recorded two takes of "Bombers" and "It Ain't Easy", the latter featuring backing vocals by Dana Gillespie. Five days later, the group recorded four takes of "Quicksand", the last of which appears on the finished album. On 18 July, the group spent the day rehearsing and mixing. Further mixing sessions were carried out between 21 and 26 July to compile a promotional album for Gem Productions. By this point, the songs "Oh! You Pretty Things", "Eight Line Poem", "Kooks", "Queen Bitch" and "Andy Warhol" had been recorded; the mixes of "Eight Line Poem" and "Kooks" on the promotional album differed from the final versions on Hunky Dory. "The Bewlay Brothers" and "Changes" were recorded on 30 July. On 6 August, the band recorded "Life on Mars?" and "Song for Bob Dylan", after which the recording process was considered finished. Before the sessions ended, Bowie asked Wakeman if he wanted to be a part of the Spiders from Mars. Wakeman declined and joined the progressive rock band Yes instead.

== Songs ==
After the hard rock sound of The Man Who Sold the World, Hunky Dory features a stylistic shift towards art pop and melodic pop rock. The songs are mostly piano-led rather than guitar-led. The biographer Marc Spitz believes the piano incites a warmer feel on this record compared to its two predecessors. Christopher Sandford states that "the songs [are] characterised by the lush ambience established by Bowie's vocal and the piano" and, along with Elton John and Phil Collins, helped create music on the "easy-listening continuum". Lior Phillips of Consequence of Sound wrote that the songs are accessible, both musically and lyrically, allowing the listener to dissect them again and again. The music journalist Peter Doggett concurs, regarding Hunky Dory as "a collective of attractively accessible pop songs, through which Bowie tested out his feelings about the nature of stardom and power". Rick Quinn described the songs in PopMatters as a fusion of "British pop, orchestral works, art-rock, folk and ballads" that emerge to form glam rock.

Robert Dimery, in his book 1001 Albums You Must Hear Before You Die, calls it "a toybox of acoustic oddities, tributes to heroes and surrealism". Stephen Thomas Erlewine of AllMusic describes it as "a kaleidoscopic array of pop styles, tied together only by Bowie's sense of vision: a sweeping, cinematic mélange of high and low art, ambiguous sexuality, kitsch, and class". Michael Gallucci of Ultimate Classic Rock notes that it is Bowie's first record to include "a mix of pop, glam, art and folk wrapped in an ambisexual pose that would come to define the artist". James Perone similarly describes the album as "a unique blend of folk, pop, glam, and progressive rock" that distinguished Bowie from other musicians at the time. Peter Ormerod of The Guardian writes that the music of Hunky Dory celebrates "uncertainty, rootlessness, inner chaos, difference, otherness, doubt and impermanence" and did it with "beauty, style and charisma".

=== Side one ===
The chorus of "Changes"
The chorus of "Changes" features Bowie stuttering the 'ch' at the beginning of the word 'changes'. The piano-led track widely differs from the music found in Bowie's previous works.

The opening track, "Changes", is built around a distinctive piano riff. The lyrics focus on the compulsive nature of artistic reinvention and distancing oneself from the rock mainstream. The biographer David Buckley writes that "strange fascination" is a phrase that "embodies a continued quest for the new and the bizarre". Pegg summarises the lyrics as Bowie "holding a mirror to his face" just as he is about to achieve stardom. Doggett notes that "Changes" is a "statement of purpose": as the opening track, the song provided a stark contrast to the hard rock sound found on its predecessor. The song was also unlike "Space Oddity" and its 1969 parent album, but rather "pure, unashamedly melodic, gleefully commercial, gorgeously mellifluous pop".

"Oh! You Pretty Things" was the first track written for the album. The piano style has been compared to the Beatles' "Martha My Dear". The lyrics reference the teachings of the occultist Aleister Crowley and his Golden Dawn and the philosopher Friedrich Nietzsche, particularly with the lines "the homo superior", "the golden ones" and "homo sapiens have outgrown their use". "Homo Superior" refers to Nietzsche's theory of Übermensch, or "Superman". The music itself provides a contrast to the darker themes. Doggett describes Bowie's vocal performance as "quite unadorned, presented so starkly ... that it [is] almost unsettling".

Designed to sound like a "continuation" of the previous track, "Eight Line Poem" is described by Pegg as the album's most "overlooked" song. It features Bowie on a gentle, sporadic piano while he sings and a country-influenced guitar line from Ronson. Exactly eight lines long, the lyrics describe a room where a cat just knocked over a spinning mobile and a cactus sits in a window. Doggett believes there is a metaphor between the cactus and a prairie. At the time of the album's release, Bowie described the song as the city that is "a kind of high-life wart on the backside of the prairie".

"Life on Mars?" is described by Buckley as a "soaring, cinematic ballad". Although Bowie was fixated on becoming Ziggy Stardust at the time of its recording, the song has no connection to Mars itself; the title was a reference to the recent media frenzy of the US and Soviet Union racing to get to the red planet. The song is a parody of singer Frank Sinatra's "My Way", an English-language translation of the French song "Comme d'habitude", and uses the same chord sequence for its opening bars. The handwritten notes on the back cover say "Inspired by Frankie". Like most songs on the album, "Life on Mars?" is mostly piano-led, but features a string arrangement from Ronson – his first – that is described by Doggett as "gargantuan". Bowie's vocals – recorded in one take – are delivered passionately during the chorus and almost nasally in the verses. He mentions "the girl with the mousy hair", whose identity commentators have debated, (Note: Many journalists and commentators have suggested "the girl with the mousy hair" to be Hermione Farthingale, a former girlfriend of Bowie. However, Pegg disagrees, writing that there's no evidence to support this claim and Farthingale herself has rejected this theory.) and who according to Greene "goes to the movies as an escape from life".

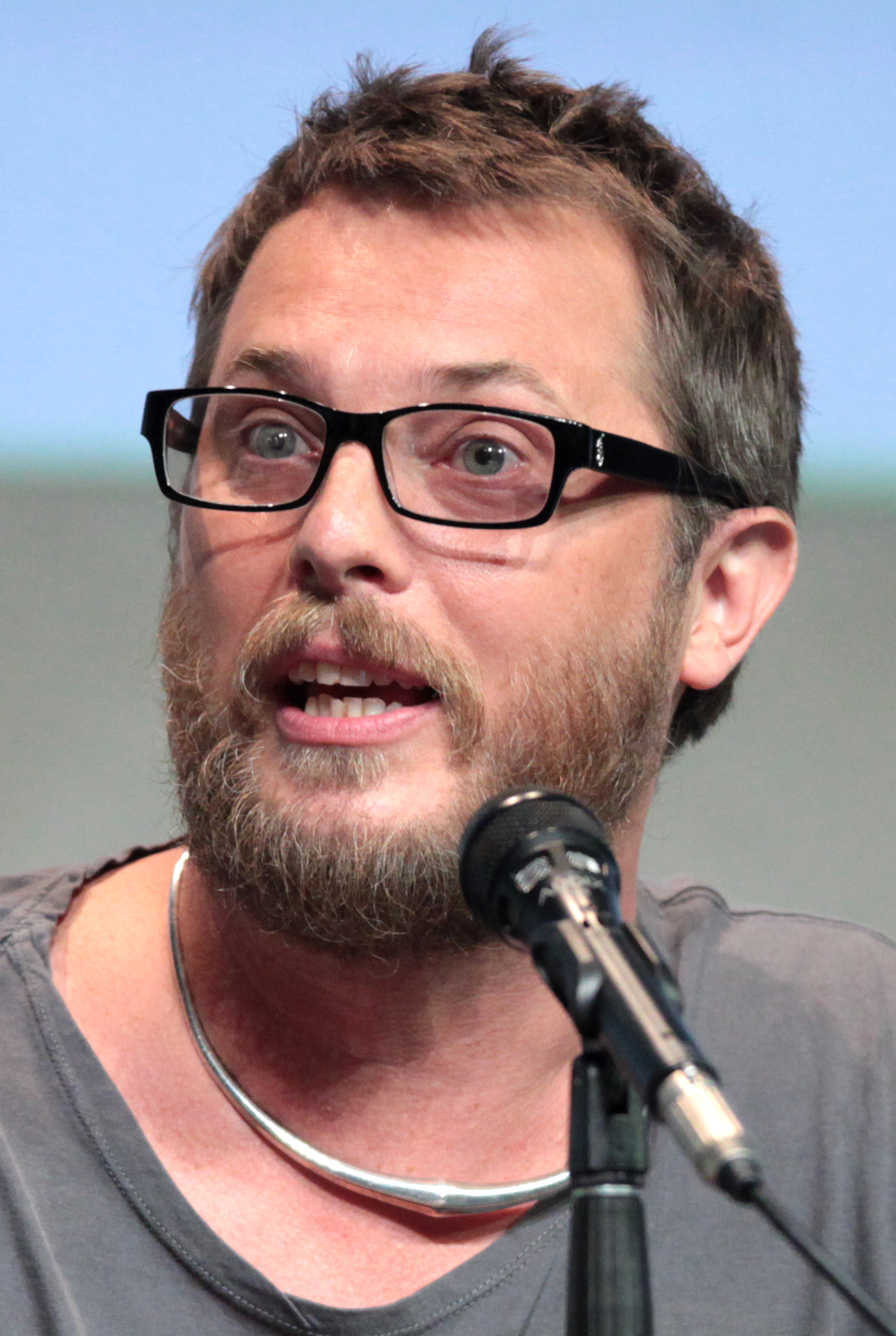
"Kooks" is a tribute to Bowie's son Duncan Jones (pictured in 2015).

A few days after his son Duncan Zowie Haywood Jones was born on 30 May 1971, Bowie completed "Kooks" and dedicated it to him. Performed by Bowie as early as 3 June, the Hunky Dory version features a string arrangement from Ronson and trumpet played by Bolder. "Kooks" is noticeably lighter than the two tracks it is sequenced between but, according to Pegg, ultimately "carries a hint of [the album's] preoccupation with the compulsion to fictionalise life, as Bowie invites his son to 'stay in our lovers' story'". Doggett writes that its inclusion on Hunky Dory "ensured its enduring appeal among those who were less entranced by his explorations of politics, psychology and occult elsewhere on the album". In the handwritten liner notes on the LP sleeve, Bowie wrote "For Small Z".

According to Pegg, "Quicksand" was inspired by Bowie's trip to America in February 1971. Doggett states that the song "was written about a lack of inspiration and as a means of accessing it". Writer Colin Wilson wrote in The Occult (1971) that thought was a form of quicksand that allowed consciousness to keep the unconscious beyond reach, from which Doggett concluded that "'Quicksand' was Bowie's plea to search within himself to be shown the way". In the mid-1970s, Bowie described the song as "a mixture of narrative and surrealism" and a "precursor" to the music of his 1977 album Low. Throughout the track, Bowie makes numerous references to Crowley and his Golden Dawn, Winston Churchill, Heinrich Himmler and the "supermen" of Friedrich Nietzsche. "Quicksand" also evokes spiritualism through the mention of Buddhist teachings such as bardo. The instrumental track features multiple layers of acoustic guitars atop one another, which was done at Scott's insistence.

=== Side two ===
"Fill Your Heart", written by Biff Rose and Paul Williams, is the only track on Hunky Dory not written by Bowie; it was his first recorded cover song in six years. It replaced "Bombers" as the side two opener late in the album's development. "Fill Your Heart" is one of the more up-tempo tracks on the album, and according to Doggett is "practically identical" to Rose's original version, albeit more "bouncy" and less "swung". The piano-driven arrangement differs from Bowie's live performances of the song in 1970 when acoustic guitar dominated. Pegg writes that the track provides a "cogent counterpoint" to the "angst" of "Quicksand" and the "cautionary warnings" of "Changes" and is best remembered for Bowie's saxophone break, Ronson's string arrangement, and Wakeman's piano solo.

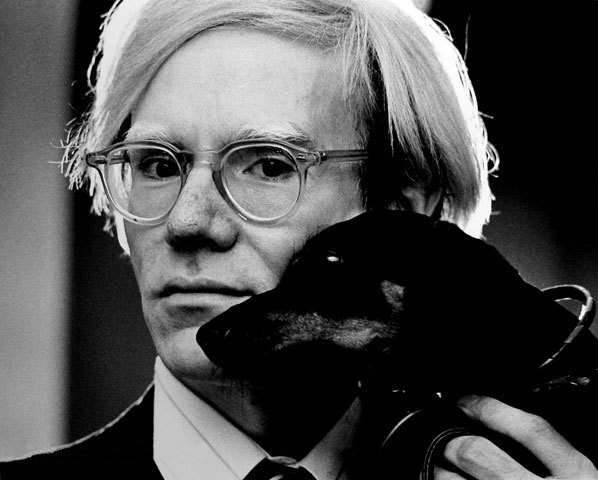
Andy Warhol in 1973

The song "Andy Warhol" is a tribute to the American artist, producer, and director Andy Warhol, who had inspired Bowie since the mid-1960s and was described by him as "one of the leaders" of "the media of the streets, street messages". Originally written for Bowie's friend Dana Gillespie, the song is based around a riff played on two acoustic guitars that heavily resembles the intro of Ron Davies' "Silent Song Through the Land". The lyrics emphasise Warhol's belief that life and art blur together. The song's opening features Ken Scott saying "This is 'Andy Warhol', and it's take one", only for Bowie to correct his pronunciation of "Warhol". When Bowie met Warhol in September 1971 and played the song for him, Warhol hated it and left the room; Bowie recalled in 1997 that he found the meeting "fascinating" because Warhol had "nothing to say at all, absolutely nothing".

"Song for Bob Dylan" is a tribute song to the singer-songwriter Bob Dylan. It was described by Bowie at the time as "how some see BD", and its title is a parody of Dylan's 1962 tribute to folk singer Woody Guthrie, "Song to Woody". Throughout the song, Bowie addresses Dylan by his real name "Robert Zimmerman". Pegg and Doggett believe the song highlights Bowie's struggle with identity, from his real name David Jones, to his stage name David Bowie and, very shortly, to Ziggy Stardust. The lyrics specifically present Dylan as no longer being a hero figure for rock music, and demand that he return to his roots and come to the rescue for the unfaithful. According to Doggett, Bowie initially wrote it for his friend George Underwood. The music contains Dylanesque chord changes and the chorus is derived from the titles of two Velvet Underground songs, "Here She Comes Now" and "There She Goes Again". Buckley writes that the song is "probably the weakest" on the album and Pegg considers it "little-regarded".

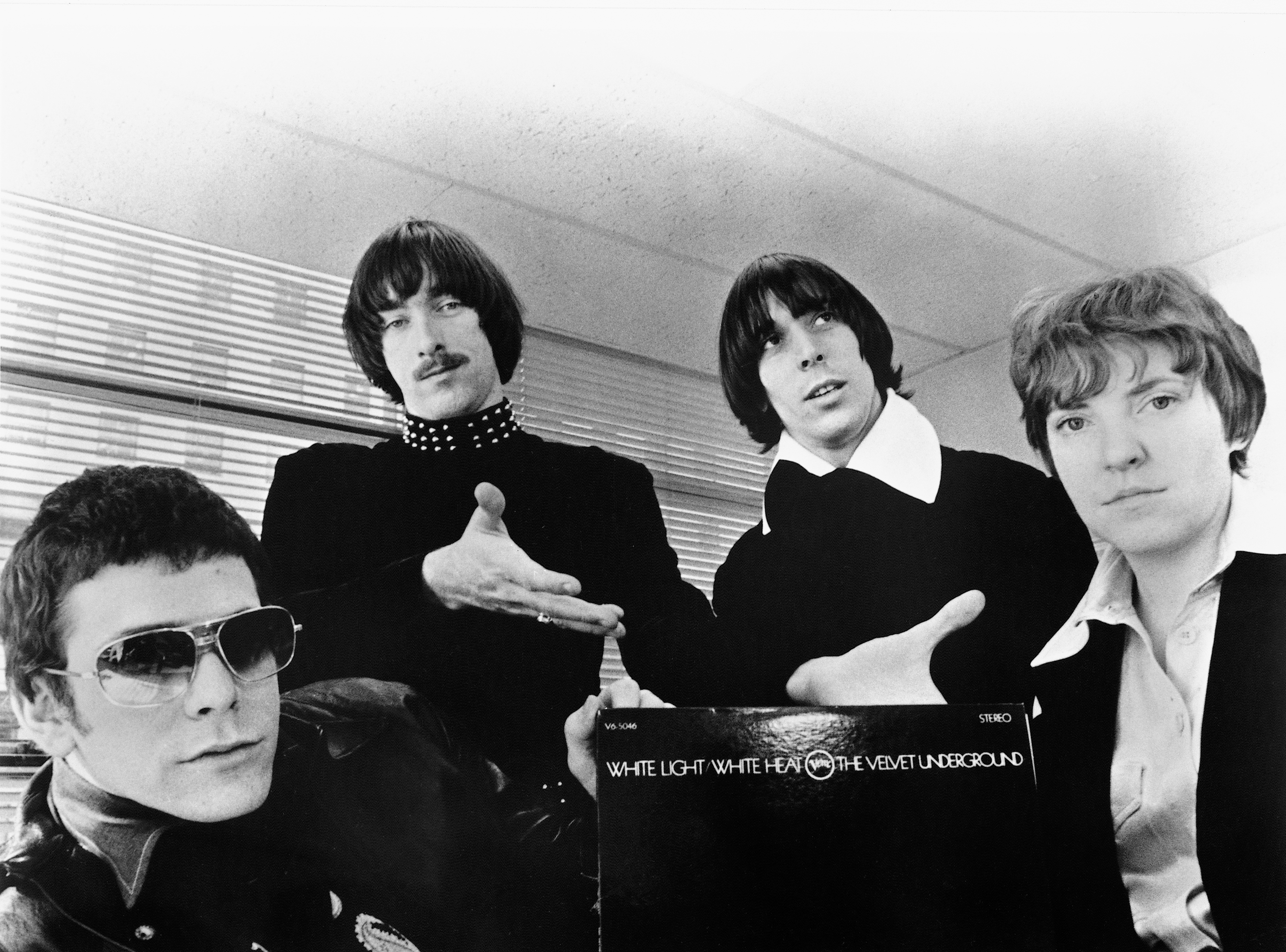
The Velvet Underground in 1968

The final tribute song on the album, "Queen Bitch" is largely inspired by the rock band the Velvet Underground, specifically their lead singer Lou Reed. The handwritten sleeve notes on the back cover read: "some V.U. White Light returned with thanks". Unlike the majority of the album's tracks, "Queen Bitch" is primarily driven by guitar rather than piano, and characterized as glam rock and proto-punk. The chorus sings about Bowie mincing his "satin and tat" as a reference to the dancer Lindsay Kemp. Pegg states: "Part of the genius of 'Queen Bitch' is that it filters the archness of Marc Bolan and Kemp through the streetwise attitude of Reed: this is a song that succeeds in making the phrase 'bipperty-bopperty hat' sound raunchy and cool." Daryl Easlea of BBC Music writes that the song's glam rock sound foreshadowed the direction Bowie took on Ziggy Stardust.

[It's] another vaguely anecdotal piece about my feelings about myself and my brother, or my other doppelgänger. I was never quite sure what real position Terry had in my life, whether Terry was a real person or whether I was actually referring to another part of me, and I think 'Bewlay Brothers' was really about that.

— David Bowie describing "The Bewlay Brothers", in the BBC documentary Golden Years

The album closer, "The Bewlay Brothers", was a late addition and the only track that was not demoed. The instrumentation echoes the music of The Man Who Sold the World, featuring "sinister" sound effects and Bowie's vocal accompanied by Ronson's acoustic guitar. The song's obscure lyrics have caused confusion among Bowie biographers and fans. Pegg describes it as "probably the most cryptic, mysterious, unfathomable and downright frightening Bowie recording in existence", and Buckley considers it "one of Bowie's most disquieting moments on tape, an encapsulation of some distant, indefinable quality of expressionistic terror". Many reviewers have perceived the track to have homoerotic undertones; others believed it to be about Bowie's relationship with his schizophrenic half-brother Terry Burns, which Bowie confirmed in 1977. Buckley is unsure whether this account is fictionalised or real. Some of the lyrics refer to other tracks on Hunky Dory, including "Song for Bob Dylan", "Oh! You Pretty Things" and "Changes". Bowie also uses the word "chameleon" in the song, which became an oft-used term to describe him.

== Title and artwork ==
The cover photograph was taken by Brian Ward, who was introduced to Bowie by Bob Grace at Ward's studio in Heddon Street. An early idea was for Bowie to dress as a pharaoh, partly inspired by the media's infatuation with the British Museum's new Tutankhamun exhibit. According to Pegg, photos of Bowie posing "as a sphinx and in a lotus position" were taken – one was released as part of the 1990 Space Oddity reissue – but the idea was ultimately abandoned. Bowie recalled: "We didn't run with it, as they say. Probably a good idea." Bowie opted for a more minimalist image reflecting the album's "preoccupation with the silver screen". He later said: "I was into Oxford bags, and there are a pair, indeed, on the back of the album. [I was attempting] what I presumed was kind of an Evelyn Waugh Oxbridge look." The final image is a close-up of Bowie looking past the camera while he pulls back his hair. Pegg writes that his pose was influenced by the actresses Lauren Bacall and Greta Garbo. Originally shot in monochrome, the image was recoloured by illustrator Terry Pastor, a partner at Covent Garden's recently initiated Main Artery design studio with George Underwood; Pastor later designed the cover and sleeve for Ziggy Stardust. Pegg writes: "Bowie's decision to use a re-coloured photo suggests a hand-tinted lobby-card from the days of the silent cinema and, simultaneously, Warhol's famous Marilyn Diptych screen-prints." Dimery writes that Bowie took a photo book that contained multiple Marlene Dietrich prints with him to the photoshoot.

Although Bowie normally waited to name his albums until the last possible moment, the title "Hunky Dory" was announced at the John Peel session. Grace got the idea from an Esher pub landlord. He told Peter and Leni Gillman, the authors of Alias David Bowie, that the landlord had an unusual vocabulary that was infused with "upper-crust jargon" such as "prang" and "whizzo" and "everything's hunky-dory". Grace told Bowie, who loved it. Pegg notes that there was a song from 1957 by American doo-wop band the Guytones also titled "Hunky Dory" that may also have played a part. Spitz states that "hunky-dory" is an English slang term that means everything is right in the world. The original UK cover featured Bowie's name and the album title; in the US the title was instead printed on a sticker and placed onto the translucent wrapping. According to Cann, initial UK pressings were laminated, which enhanced the colour to create a "superior finish"; these pressings are now collector's items. The back cover featured Bowie's handwritten notes about each song from the album. It also bore the credit "Produced by Ken Scott (assisted by the actor)" – the "actor" being Bowie himself, whose "pet conceit", in the words of the NME critics Roy Carr and Charles Shaar Murray, was "to think of himself as an actor".

== Release ==
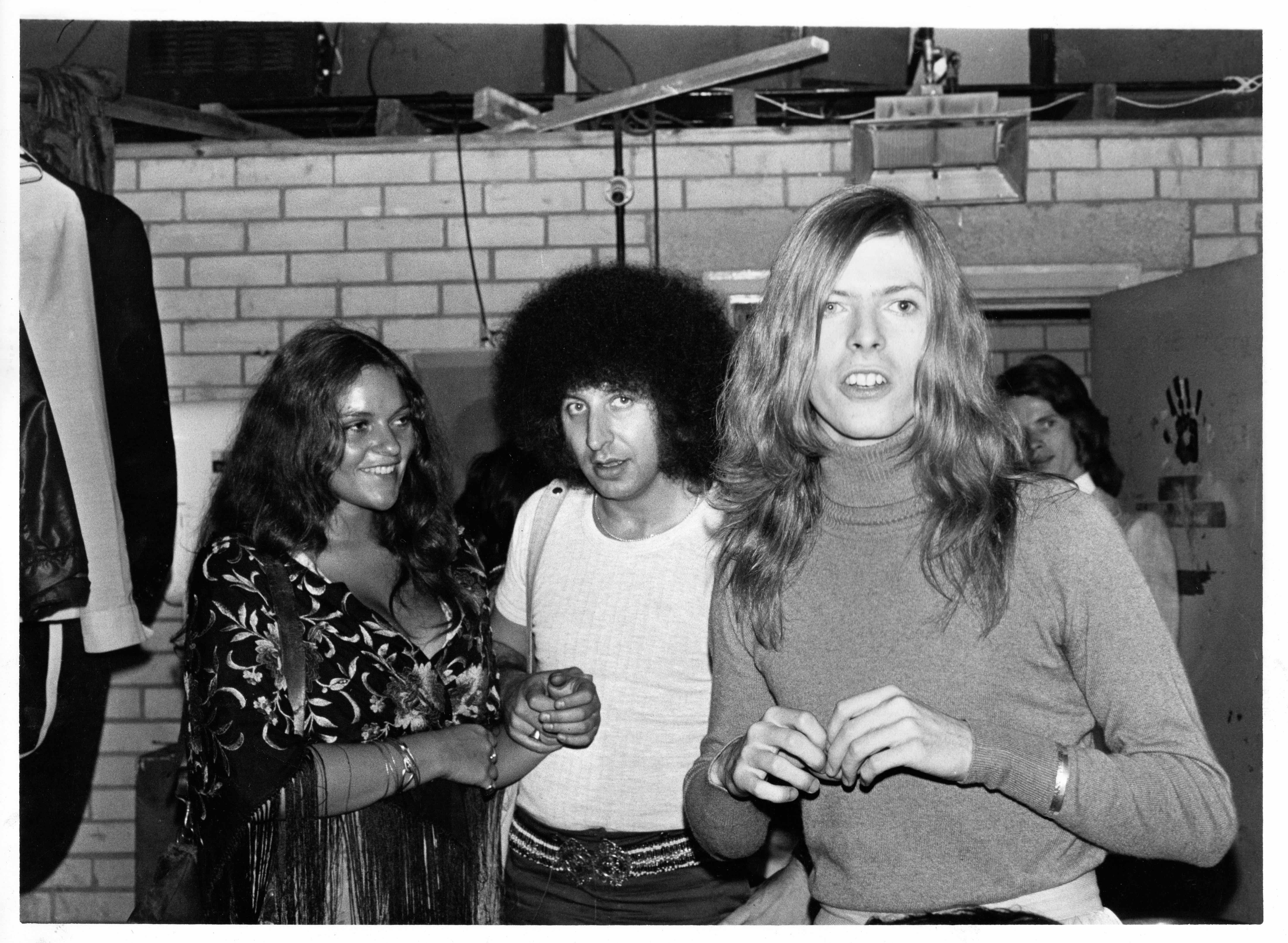
Left to right: Dana Gillespie, Tony Defries and David Bowie at Andy Warhol's Pork at London's Roundhouse in 1971.

A few months after he had terminated Bowie's contract with Mercury, Defries showcased the newly recorded Hunky Dory to multiple labels in the US, including New York City's RCA Records. Defries told RCA that they "had nothing since the fifties" but they could "own the seventies" if they hired Bowie. "Because David Bowie is going to remake the decade, just like the Beatles did in the sixties." Its head Dennis Katz had never heard of Bowie but recognised the potential of the piano-based songs that Defries played for him and signed the artist to a three-record deal on 9 September 1971; RCA was Bowie's label for the rest of the decade.

Hunky Dory was released in the UK on 17 December 1971 through RCA. By this time, the sessions for Ziggy Stardust were underway. The album release was supported by the single "Changes" on 7 January 1972. The album received little promotion from RCA due to its unusual cover image and a warning that Bowie was changing his image for his next album. Pegg writes that there were disagreements over how much money was put into the album and whether Bowie was an "unproven one-hit-wonder". Marketing manager Geoff Hannington recalled in 1986: "We soon knew we were in a situation where the artist was going to change like a chameleon from time to time." Because of this, the album initially sold poorly and failed to break the UK Albums Chart. According to Sandford, the album barely sold 5,000 copies in the first quarter.

It was only after the breakthrough of Ziggy Stardust in mid-1972 that Hunky Dory became a commercial success. It climbed to number three in the UK (two places higher than Ziggy Stardust), and remained on the chart for 69 weeks. Hunky Dory also peaked at number 39 on the Kent Music Report in Australia. Gallucci writes that although the album did not make Bowie a star, it "got him noticed", and the success of Ziggy Stardust helped Hunky Dory garner a larger audience. RCA released "Life on Mars?" as a single on 22 June 1973, which also made number three in Britain. A reissue returned the album to the UK chart in January 1981, where it remained for 51 weeks.

== Critical reception ==
=== Initial reviews ===
Hunky Dory was met with very positive reviews from several British and American publications. Melody Maker called it "the most inventive piece of song-writing to have appeared on record in a considerable time", while Danny Holloway of the NME described it as Bowie "at his brilliant best". Holloway added that "[Hunky Dory is] a breath of fresh air compared to the usual mainstream rock LP of [1972]. It's very possible that this will be the most important album from an emerging artist in 1972, because he's not following trends – he's setting them". In the US, John Mendelsohn of Rolling Stone called the album Bowie's "most engaging album musically" up to that point and praised his songwriting, particularly his ability to convey ideas without employing "a barrage of seemingly impregnable verbiage". Billboard gave the album a positive review, praising it as "a heavy debut for RCA, loaded with the kind of Top 40 and FM appeal that should break him through big on the charts. Strong material, his own, for programming includes 'Changes', 'Oh! You Pretty Things', and 'Life on Mars?'". In the Los Angeles Times, Robert Hilburn believed that, compared to his first three albums, Hunky Dory assured that Bowie deserved a spot amongst the "most important pop music figures" of the time. He further described Bowie as a "major talent", praising the album's instrumentation, vocal performances and themes.

Several reviewers praised Bowie as an artist. The New York Times wrote that with Hunky Dory, Bowie became "the most intellectually brilliant man yet to choose the long-playing album as his medium of expression", while Rock magazine called him "the most singularly gifted artist making music today. He has the genius to be to the '70s what Lennon, McCartney, Jagger and Dylan were to the '60s." In The Village Voice, Robert Christgau hailed Bowie as "a singer-composer with brains, imagination, and a good idea of how to use a recording console", and the album "a quick change tour de force that is both catchy and deeply felt". In the publication's annual Pazz & Jop poll, Hunky Dory ranked as the year's 18th best album.

=== Retrospective reviews ===
Retrospective professional ratings
Review scores
Source	Rating
AllMusic	5/5 stars
Blender	5/5 stars
Chicago Tribune	3.5/4 stars
Christgau's Record Guide	A−
Classic Rock	4.5/5 stars
Encyclopedia of Popular Music	5/5 stars
Pitchfork	10/10
Rolling Stone	5/5 stars
The Rolling Stone Album Guide	5/5 stars
Spin	5/5 stars
Spin Alternative Record Guide	9/10

Hunky Dory has continued to receive critical acclaim and is regarded as one of Bowie's best works. Many reviewers have praised the songwriting, with a writer for Blender calling the songs some of the best Bowie has ever written. Others, including Bryan Wawzenek of Ultimate Classic Rock, have commended the wide array of genres present in the songs and their ability to blend together throughout. Erlewine wrote: "On the surface, [having] such a wide range of styles and sounds would make an album incoherent, but Bowie's improved songwriting and determined sense of style instead made Hunky Dory a touchstone for reinterpreting pop's traditions into fresh, postmodern pop music". Similarly, Greg Kot of the Chicago Tribune described the album as "the first taste of Bowie's multifaceted genius".

In a 2013 readers' poll for Rolling Stone, Hunky Dory was voted Bowie's second greatest album, behind Ziggy Stardust. Douglas Wolk of Pitchfork reviewed the album's remaster for the 2015 box set Five Years 1969–1973 and gave it a 10-out-of-10 rating, believing the songs to be "scattered but splendid" and finding Bowie's songwriting a "huge leap" from his previous works. Another Pitchfork writer, Ryan Schrieber, stated: "The album is by no means his most cohesive release, but it remains one of his most charming, and unquestionably, one of his best." Following Bowie's death in 2016, Rob Sheffield of Rolling Stone listed it as one of Bowie's essential albums, writing, "Hunky Dory was the album where he staked his claim as the most altered ego in rock & roll."

== Influence and legacy ==
Hunky Dory gave me a fabulous groundswell. I guess it provided me, for the first time in my life, with an actual audience – I mean, people actually coming up to me and saying, 'Good album, good songs.' That hadn't happened to me before.

— David Bowie, 1999

Many biographers and reviewers have agreed that Hunky Dory marked the beginning of Bowie's artistic success. Pegg writes: "Hunky Dory stands at the first great crossroads in Bowie's career. It was his last album until Low to be presented purely as a sonic artefact rather than a vehicle for the dramatic visual element with which he was soon to make his name as a performer". Buckley notes that 1971 was a pivotal year for Bowie, the year in which he became "something of a pop-art agent provocateur". In a time when rock musicians looked to traditions and established standards, Bowie looked to be radically different and challenge tradition, reinventing himself again and again, thereby creating new standards and conventions. Buckley further said: "Its almost easy-listening status and conventional musical sensibility has detracted from the fact that, lyrically, this record lays down the blueprint for Bowie's future career". Spitz writes that many artists have their "it all came together on this one" record. "For David Bowie, it's Hunky Dory". The biographer Paul Trynka states that the record marked a "new beginning" for the artist and that has a "freshness" to it that all of Bowie's previous studio albums lacked, primarily because when making his previous albums, Bowie was working to satisfy record executives. When making Hunky Dory, Bowie was working to satisfy himself, which is reflected in the record.

BBC Music's Daryl Easlea wrote that the album saw Bowie finding his own voice after "scrabbling around stylistically" for almost a decade and "finally demonstrated [his] enormous potential to the listening public". Schrieber stated: "Hunky Dory marked the true start of what would be one of the most successful careers in rock music, spawning millions of scarily obsessive fans." Similarly, Michael Gallucci of Ultimate Classic Rock contended that Hunky Dory is "where Bowie starts to become Bowie", featuring lyrical and stylistic themes he replicated on future releases. He concludes that all Bowie's future guises begin to find their voices with Hunky Dory. NME's Emily Barker called it Bowie's "most time-tested album" and wrote, "it was [his] incredible song-writing gifts on [the record] that convinced us he was beamed from the stars." The writer Colin Larkin called it his most "eclectic" album and served as the preparation for Bowie's subsequent changes in musical direction. In 2016, Billboard's Joe Lynch argued that Hunky Dory provided the "blueprint" for lo-fi indie pop records for the next 25 years, citing Ariel Pink as an artist influenced by the album.

Many musicians have acknowledged the album's influence. In 1999, Dave Stewart of Eurythmics said: "Hunky Dory – I love the sound of it. I still kind of use it as a sort of reference-point." In 2002, Culture Club's Boy George cited Hunky Dory as the record that changed his life, saying: "The album as a whole is so unusual, so far removed from anything you heard on the radio. It's so complete, it all fits together." In an interview with Mojo in 2007, KT Tunstall declared Hunky Dory her favorite album, saying: "It's the only record where I've experienced total jaw-dropping awe for the whole of it because that feeling of being lost and being taken somewhere else is so strong." In an interview with NME the following year, Guy Garvey of Elbow recognised Hunky Dory as the album that had influenced him the most.

=== Rankings ===
Hunky Dory has frequently appeared on several lists of the greatest albums of all time by multiple publications. In 1998, Q magazine readers voted it the 43rd greatest album of all time; in 2000 the same magazine placed it at number 16 in its list of the 100 Greatest British Albums Ever. The album ranked number 16 and number 23 in the 1998 and 2000 editions of Colin Larkin's book All Time Top 1000 Albums, respectively. In their list of the 500 Greatest Albums of All Time, Rolling Stone ranked it number 107 in 2003, number 108 in the 2012 revised list, and number 88 in the 2020 revised list. In 2004, Pitchfork ranked the album 80th on their list of the 100 Best Albums of the 1970s, one place above Ziggy Stardust. In the same year, VH1 placed it 47th in their list of the 100 greatest albums. In 2010, Time magazine chose it as one of the 100 best albums of all time, with journalist Josh Tyrangiel praising Bowie's "earthbound ambition to be a boho poet with prodigal style". The same year, Consequence of Sound ranked the album number 18 on their list of the 100 greatest albums of all time. In 2013, NME ranked the album third in their list of the 500 Greatest Albums of All Time, behind the Beatles' Revolver and the Smiths' The Queen Is Dead. In 2015, Ultimate Classic Rock included it in their list of the 100 best rock albums from the 1970s. In 2021, Spin ranked it the sixth best album of 1971. Robert Dimery included the album in his 2005 book 1001 Albums You Must Hear Before You Die.

== Reissues ==
The album has been reissued multiple times. Following its release on compact disc in the mid-1980s, Hunky Dory was rereleased by Rykodisc/EMI in 1990 with bonus tracks, including the outtake "Bombers". In 1999, the original album was rereleased on CD through Virgin/EMI with 24-bit digitally remastered sound. This edition was reissued in 2014 by Parlophone, having acquired the Virgin-owned Bowie catalogue. In 2015, the album was remastered for the Five Years (1969–1973) box set. It was released in CD, vinyl, and digital formats, both as part of this compilation and separately. In 2021, to celebrate the record's 50th anniversary, Parlophone announced a vinyl picture disc reissue of the album (2015 remaster), which was released on 7 January 2022. The announcement coincided with the digital release of a new mix of "Changes" by Scott. In November 2022, a multi-disc box set focusing on Hunky Dory was released with the title Divine Symmetry: The Journey to Hunky Dory. The collection comprises home demos, BBC radio sessions, alternate mixes, and other live and studio recordings from 1971. It also includes the 2015 remaster, as well as an "alternative" version of Hunky Dory, made up of alternate mixes; the latter was released separately on vinyl in February 2023.

== Track listing ==
All tracks are written by David Bowie, except "Fill Your Heart", written by Biff Rose and Paul Williams.

Side one
No.	Title	Length
1.	"Changes"	3:37
2.	"Oh! You Pretty Things"	3:12
3.	"Eight Line Poem"	2:55
4.	"Life on Mars?"	3:43
5.	"Kooks"	2:53
6.	"Quicksand"	5:08

Side two
No.	Title	Length
1.	"Fill Your Heart"	3:07
2.	"Andy Warhol"	3:56
3.	"Song for Bob Dylan"	4:12
4.	"Queen Bitch"	3:18
5.	"The Bewlay Brothers"	5:22

== Personnel ==
Album credits per the Hunky Dory liner notes and biographer Nicholas Pegg, except where noted.

- David Bowie – vocals, guitar, alto and tenor saxophone, piano ("Oh! You Pretty Things", "Eight Line Poem")
- Mick Ronson – guitar, vocals, Mellotron, arrangements, recorder ("Life on Mars?")
- Trevor Bolder – bass guitar, trumpet
- Mick Woodmansey – drums
- Rick Wakeman – piano
- Ken Scott – ARP synthesiser ("Andy Warhol")

Production

- Ken Scott – producer, recording engineer, mixing engineer
- David Bowie – producer
- Brian Ward – photography
- Terry Pastor – cover design

== Charts ==
=== Weekly charts ===
1972 chart performance for Hunky Dory
Chart (1972)	Peak position
Australian Albums (Kent Music Report)	39
Finnish Albums (Suomen virallinen lista)	15
UK Albums (Official Charts)	3

2002 chart performance for Hunky Dory
Chart (2002)	Peak position
Irish Albums (IRMA)	24

2016 chart performance for Hunky Dory
Chart (2016)	Peak position
Australian Albums (ARIA)	45
Austrian Albums (Ö3 Austria)	52
Canadian Albums (Billboard)	43
Danish Albums (Hitlisten)	26
French Albums (SNEP)	62
Italian Albums (FIMI)	56
New Zealand Albums (RIANZ)	30
Norwegian Albums (VG-lista)	23
Swedish Albums (Sverigetopplistan)	16
Swiss Albums (Schweizer Hitparade)	32
US Billboard 200	57
US Top Catalog Albums (Billboard)	4

2022 chart performance for Hunky Dory
Chart (2022)	Peak position
German Albums (Offizielle Top 100)	53
Hungarian Albums (MAHASZ)	31

=== Year-end charts ===
2016 year-end chart performance for Hunky Dory
Chart (2016)	Position
UK Albums (OCC)	83

== Certifications ==
Certifications for Hunky Dory
Region	Certification	Certified units/sales
Denmark (IFPI Danmark)	Gold	10,000^{‡}
Italy (FIMI) sales since 2009	Gold	25,000^{‡}
New Zealand (RMNZ)	Gold	7,500^{‡}
United Kingdom (BPI)	Platinum	300,000^{^}
Summaries
Worldwide	—	3,600,000
^{^} Shipments figures based on certification alone.^{‡} Sales+streaming figures based on certification alone.
