= Bombers (David Bowie song) =

Song by David Bowie

from the album Hunky Dory (Rykodisc edition)
- Released: 30 January 1990
- Recorded: 9 July 1971
- Studio: Trident, London
- Genre: Pop rock, glam rock
- Length: 4:12
- Label: RCA
- Songwriter: David Bowie
- Producers: Ken Scott, David Bowie

"Bombers" is a song written by English singer-songwriter David Bowie. It was recorded in July 1971 and intended for the album Hunky Dory, but was replaced at the last minute by the cover "Fill Your Heart".

It was released as a promo single by RCA in the US in November 1971, backed by a remix of "Eight Line Poem" that can only be found on this single (both tracks were also issued on an extremely limited edition promotional LP by RCA/Gem). A bootleg version backing "London Bye Ta-Ta" was also released in the early 1970s. The track was eventually given wide release as a bonus track on the Rykodisc reissue of Hunky Dory in 1990.

The song was officially released for the second time in 2017 on a newly mixed re-issue of the promotional RCA/Gem LP (commonly entitled "Bowpromo") as an exclusive release for Record Store Day.

== Track listing ==
1. "Bombers" (Bowie)
2. "Eight Line Poem" (Bowie)

== Production credits ==
- Producer:
  - Ken Scott
- Musicians:
  - David Bowie: vocals, guitar
  - Mick Ronson: guitar
  - Trevor Bolder: bass
  - Mick Woodmansey: drums
  - Rick Wakeman: piano

== Live versions ==
- Bowie played "Bombers" on the BBC show In Concert: John Peel on 3 June 1971. This was broadcast on 20 June 1971 and released in 2000 on the album Bowie at the Beeb.
- Bowie played the song during his set at the Glastonbury Festival, Worthy Farm, Pilton, UK, in the early hours of 20 June 1971.
