= Roughler =

The Roughler chronicled life in Ladbroke Grove in the 1980s and 1990s before the last Bohemians were forced out. The magazine was single-handedly produced by Ray Roughler Jones, a refugee from Swansea, and contained contributions from The Clash, Will Self, Jock Scott, Shane MacGowan, Neneh Cherry, Joe Rush of Mutoid Waste, Keith and Kevin Allen plus local heroes such as Steve Underground, John The Hat and Ian Bone of Class War. It was headquartered in West London. It was published between 1983 and 2004.

It provided a focus for a shambolic group of creative people and offshoots included the infamous Roughler Gallery in an abandoned Chinese takeaway in NoGo (North of Golborne Road). The Roughler chronicled the rise and fall of the Portobello Panto, through the internecine Panto Wars of the early 90s when Anna Chancellor and her dastardly gang of toffs put on a rival production.

RoughlerTV was launched at Portobello Film Festival 2007 with a daily webcast and in July 2008, RoughlerTV exhibited psychogeographic installations on the top floor of the Louis T Blouin Institute in 'It Happened Here', the opening of 'Art After Dark'. Five weeks later, they were invited back to stage A Quality Shambles, a post-Situationist Happening. In 2010, Tangent Books published Ray Roughler Jones' memoir, Drowning On Dry Land, which was described as "absurdly brilliant" by Jake Arnott. This book, released on 1 September, describes Ray's travails in Swansea, Ladbroke Grove and San Francisco. Rhys Ifans suggests 'I knew Ray as a Swansea Jack, But I never knew he was the Swansea Jack Kerouac'. Jones was voted Notting Hill Local Personality of the Year 2011 by mynottinghill website.

October 2015 saw the publication of Rays 3000 Hangovers Later, a book of photographs of The Warwick Castle on Portobello Rd in the 1980s. From 25 October, Jones can be seen as Dai Bread in Kevin Allens film of Under Milk Wood.

From 2014 Ray has been the spoken word director at Portobello Live Festival.

2016 saw the formation of a new Country rock band GLORY BOUND. 16 December saw the release of a 10" vinyl E.P. Hey Cowgirl (which way's the Rodeo).

In Spring 2018 Glory Bound returned to the Studio recording their new single Let's all get Drunk. Being released this summer.
