= Kooks (song) =

Song by David Bowie

from the album Hunky Dory
- Released: 17 December 1971 (Note: Some sources give the album release date as 17 November 1971 in the UK and 4 December in the US. According to Chris O'Leary, the US date was before the UK one, although he questions Billboard's reported date of Saturday 4 December. He does, however, clarify the UK date as 17 December.)
- Recorded: Summer 1971
- Studio: Trident, London
- Genre: Pop rock; folk rock; twee pop
- Length: 2:53
- Label: RCA
- Songwriter: David Bowie
- Producers: Ken Scott, David Bowie

Official audio
- "Kooks (2015 Remaster)" on YouTube

"Kooks" is a song written by the English singer-songwriter David Bowie, which appears on his 1971 album Hunky Dory. Bowie wrote this song to his newborn son Duncan Jones. The song was a pastiche of early 1970s Neil Young because Bowie was listening to a Neil Young record at home on 30 May 1971 when he got the news of the arrival of his son.

== Live versions ==
David Bowie "Kooks" (1971)
17 second sample from David Bowie's "Kooks".

- Before the studio recording of the song was made, it was recorded for the BBC In Concert radio show with John Peel, on 3 June 1971 (broadcast on 20 June 1971). In 2000 this recording was released on the Bowie at the Beeb album.
- The song was recorded again for the BBC Sounds of the 70s radio show with Bob Harris on 21 September 1971 (broadcast on 4 October 1971).

== Personnel ==
- David Bowie – lead and backing vocals, acoustic guitar, alto sax
- Mick Ronson – string arrangement
- Trevor Bolder – bass, trumpet
- Mick Woodmansey – drums
- Rick Wakeman – piano

== Sources ==
- Cann, Kevin (2010). Any Day Now – David Bowie: The London Years: 1947–1974. Croydon, Surrey: Adelita. ISBN 978-0-95520-177-6.
- Clerc, Benoît (2021). David Bowie All the Songs: The Story Behind Every Track. New York City: Black Dog & Leventhal. ISBN 978-0-7624-7471-4.
- O'Leary, Chris (2015). Rebel Rebel: All the Songs of David Bowie from '64 to '76. Winchester: Zero Books. ISBN 978-1-78099-244-0.
- Pegg, Nicholas (2016). The Complete David Bowie (revised and updated ed.). London: Titan Books. ISBN 978-1-78565-365-0.
- Pitchfork Staff (23 June 2004). "The 100 Best Albums of the 1970s". Pitchfork. "...and primitive twee-pop ("Kooks", "Fill Your Heart")"
