= Song for Bob Dylan =

Song by David Bowie

from the album Hunky Dory
- Released: 17 December 1971
- Recorded: 6 August 1971
- Studio: Trident, London
- Genre: Folk rock
- Length: 4:13
- Label: RCA
- Songwriter: David Bowie
- Producers: Ken Scott, David Bowie

"Song for Bob Dylan" is a song written by the English singer-songwriter David Bowie for his 1971 album Hunky Dory. The song references Bob Dylan's 1962 homage to Woody Guthrie, "Song to Woody". Yet while Dylan opens with "Hey, hey, Woody Guthrie, I wrote you a song," Bowie addresses Dylan by his birth name saying, "Now, hear this, Robert Zimmerman, I wrote a song for you."

In the song, Bowie also describes Bob Dylan's voice "like sand and glue" which is similar to how Joyce Carol Oates described it upon first hearing Dylan: "When we first heard this raw, very young, and seemingly untrained voice, frankly nasal, as if sandpaper could sing, the effect was dramatic and electrifying."

== History and recording ==
David Bowie "Song for Bob Dylan" (1971)
25 second sample from David Bowie's "Song for Bob Dylan".

Bowie premiered "Song for Bob Dylan" on 3 June 1971 during a BBC concert session, with George Underwood (King Bees bandmate and school friend) singing lead vocals. During broadcast, Bowie introduced the song as "Song for Bob Dylan – Here She Comes."

The song was first recorded at Trident Studios for Hunky Dory on 8 June 1971, with Bowie singing lead vocals and the title changed to "Song for Bob Dylan." During the Hunky Dory sessions the song went through numerous rejected retakes, with the final version recorded on 6 August.

When asked about the song at the time of Hunky Dory's release, Bowie said, "This is how some see BD." Bowie later revealed his true intention for writing the song in a 1976 Melody Maker interview saying,

"There's even a song – Song for Bob Dylan – that laid out what I wanted to do in rock. It was at that period that I said, 'okay (Dylan) if you don't want to do it, I will.' I saw that leadership void. Even though the song isn't one of the most important on the album, it represented for me what the album was all about. If there wasn't someone who was going to use rock 'n' roll, then I'd do it."

== Composition and analysis ==
While there is debate as to whether the tribute to Bob Dylan is a eulogy or a "harangue", Bowie invokes Dylan-esque musical progressions in "Song for Bob Dylan". The song is in A major and the "Dylanesque, though neither passively imitative nor parodistic" coda is described as "attain[ing] ectasy when...electric guitar weaves tipsy arabesques over broken chord pulses on two acoustic guitars." The simple, descending bass line that accompanies the folk-chord progression invokes Dylan circa 1965. Bowie also imitates Dylan's adenoidal voice throughout the song and the lyrics reflect Dylan's style of starkly contrasting narrow range-verse and swelling chorus.

== Other releases ==
- Released on BBC Pick of the Pops (349), a rare recording produced by the BBC of David Bowie's appearance on the BBC show Pick of the Pops (Show #349, 1971), hosted by John Peel.

== Personnel ==
- David Bowie – lead vocals, acoustic guitar
- Mick Ronson – electric guitars, backing vocals
- Trevor Bolder – bass
- Mick Woodmansey – drums
- Rick Wakeman – piano
