= Ladbroke Grove =

Road in London, England

Coordinates: 51.519°N 0.211°W

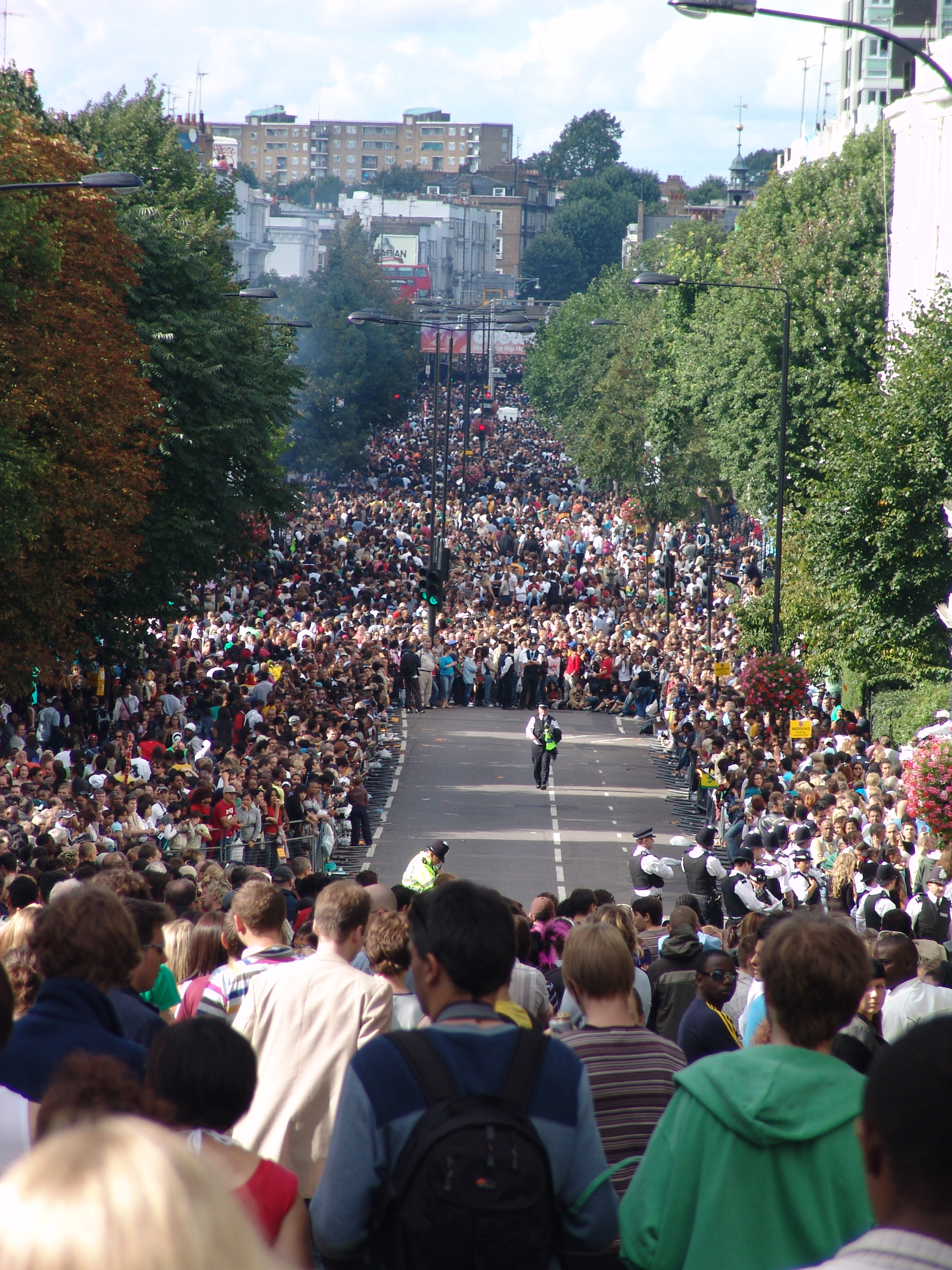
- Crowds on Ladbroke Grove during the 2006 Notting Hill Carnival

- Location within Greater London
- OS grid reference: TQ 243812
- Ceremonial county: Greater London
- Region: London
- Country: England
- Sovereign state: United Kingdom
- Post town: LONDON
- Postcode district: W10, W11
- Dialling code: 020
- Police: Metropolitan
- Fire: London
- Ambulance: London
- UK Parliament: Kensington and Bayswater

Ladbroke Grove (/ˈlædbrʊk/ LAD-bruuk) is a road in the Royal Borough of Kensington and Chelsea, London, England, which passes through Kensal Green and Notting Hill, running north–south between Harrow Road and Holland Park Avenue.

It is also the name of the surrounding area including parts of Kensal Town, Latimer Road, Kensal Green and Westbourne Park, straddling the W10 and W11 postal districts. Ladbroke Grove tube station is on the road, at the point where it is crossed by the Westway.

Ladbroke Grove is the nearest tube station to Portobello Road Market. The adjacent bridge and nearby section of the Westway were regenerated in 2007 in a partnership including Urban Eye, Transport for London and London Underground. It is the main road on the route of the annual Notting Hill Carnival. The northern end between the Harrow Road and Kensal House is in Kensal Green, the middle section between Barlby Road and the A40 flyover in North Kensington, and the southern end between Lancaster Road and Holland Park Avenue in Notting Hill.

== History ==
The area and the street are named after James Weller Ladbroke, who developed the Ladbroke Estate in the 1840s. It was originally a predominantly rural area on the western edges of London. Construction at the southern end by Holland Park Avenue began in the 1830s, but the road was not fully developed to Harrow Road until the 1870s.

Hablot Knight Browne, the cartoonist who illustrated Charles Dickens' novels as "Phiz", lived at No. 99 in 1872–80.

=== Churches ===
The church of St John the Evangelist was constructed in 1845 on the site of the Hippodrome on the Ladbroke Estate, which had closed four years earlier.

The Anglican church of St Michael and All Angels in the road was designed by James Edmeston and built in the Romanesque style in 1871. The funds were provided by J. E. Gray, the father of the first vicar, the Reverend Edward Ker Gray: the foundation stone was laid on 1 November 1870 by a cousin of the Gray's, John Mowbray. The church became fashionable with members of the Royal Family. The Duke of Edinburgh played the violin in the church orchestra. The vicarage was built in 1876, with the foundation stone being laid by the Duchess of Teck. The Lady Chapel was opened by the Duke and Duchess of Edinburgh in 1882. However, in 1886, the Reverend Mr Gray moved to the Curzon Street Chapel and St Michael's became less fashionable.

The Serbian Orthodox Church of St Sava is on Lancaster Road, just off Ladbroke Grove. The church building was originally built in 1903 as the Anglican church of St Columba; in 1952 it was re-consecrated as Saint Sava's, to serve a growing community of post-war refugees. It was the venue for the baptism of Alexander, Crown Prince of Yugoslavia, son of Peter II, in 1945, and his second marriage in 1985. Princess Maria Tatiana, daughter of Prince Andrew of Yugoslavia, was baptised there in 1957. In 2013, it was the venue for the memorial service of Princess Margarita of Baden.

The former church of Christ Church, Telford Road was opened in 1881, and closed in 1940 when the parish merged with St Michaels. The church building was demolished.

== Music and culture ==
Ladbroke Grove was a centre of the British counterculture in the 1960s. The area was blacklisted for development following 1958 Notting Hill race riots, and consequently found favour with individuals who distrusted authority, moving into unmodernised Victorian properties along the road. The space rock band Hawkwind were formed here in 1969, and eventually bonded and worked with fantasy author Michael Moorcock who was then a resident. Moorcock's work often contain references to Ladbroke Grove, the location being the headquarters of his fictional characters Jerry Cornelius and Colonel Pyat.

The Deviants (formerly the Social Deviants) and Pink Fairies were musical groups out of the Ladbroke Grove UK Underground movement, from which a number of bands would emerge, influenced by anarchistic singer/writer Mick Farren. Punk group The Clash also formed locally in 1976; frontman Joe Strummer squatted around Ladbroke Grove before joining the group. The Roughler magazine emerged in the 1980s and 1990s to chronicle the antics of the more Bohemian residents, including the legendary Portobello Pantos.

Ladbroke Grove features as the scene of Van Morrison's 1968 song "Slim Slow Slider" from Astral Weeks, and is mentioned in the 1970s pop hit "One Man Band" recorded by both Roger Daltrey and Leo Sayer. The Pulp song "I Spy", from the album Different Class, features the line "your Ladbroke Grove looks turn me on". The Blur songs "Fool's Day" and "Lonesome Street" also feature Ladbroke Grove in their lyrics. As does the song "Joel" by The Boo Radleys, with the line, "I've found myself in Ladbroke Grove" from the album Wake Up!. The Slits song "Ping Pong Affair" from the album Cut, also features Ladbroke Grove in its lyrics.

"Beautiful Stranger" by Laufey mentions Ladbroke Grove in the line "What if I hadn't left the train at Ladbroke Grove." "LDN" by Lily Allen mentions Ladbroke Grove in an overdubbed chorus of London placenames. Killing Joke have released an EP (In Excelsis) that features two mixes of a song called "Ghost Of Ladbroke Grove". The UK rapper AJ Tracey's hit "Ladbroke Grove" is named after the road which he is from; it peaked at number 3 on the UK singles chart. Mahdi made his first music video in Ladbroke Grove. The posthumous music video of the Lil Peep release "4 Gold Chains" is set at 121 Ladbroke Grove.

In 1977, a brief encounter between musicians Phil Collins and Steve Hackett on Ladbroke Grove finalised the latter's departure from the progressive rock band Genesis.

From the 2010s, Ladbroke Grove has been home to some of the most prominent grime and drill artists, such as AJ Tracey and Digga D.

== Transport ==
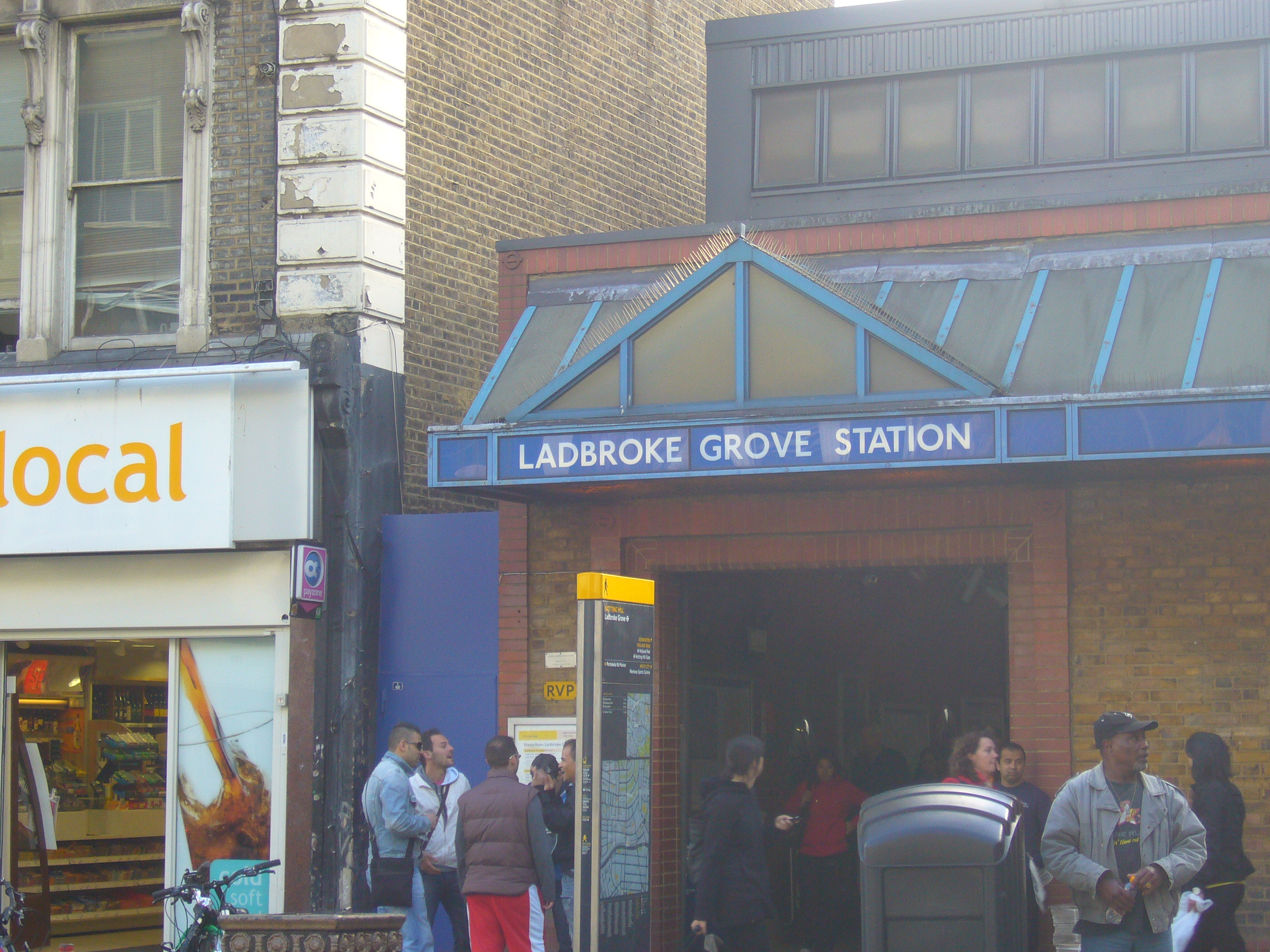
Entrance to Ladbroke Grove Underground station.

=== Rail ===
Ladbroke Grove tube station is located halfway along the road, and is served by the Circle and Hammersmith & City lines. The Westway, part of a main road from Central London to Oxford crosses in the same location, though there is no junction. The road also has bridges over the Great Western Main Line from London Paddington station, and the Grand Union Canal.

=== Crossrail ===
At a site just to the east of the Old Oak Common site, Kensington and Chelsea Council has been pushing for a station at Kensal off Ladbroke Grove and Canal Way, as a turn-back facility will have to be built in the area anyway. Siting it at Kensal Green, rather than next to Paddington itself, would provide a new station to regenerate the area. Boris Johnson stated that a station would be added if it did not increase Crossrail's overall cost; in response, Kensington and Chelsea Council agreed to underwrite the projected £33 million cost of a Crossrail station. TfL is conducting a feasibility study on the station and the project is backed by National Grid, retailers Sainsbury's and Cath Kidston, and Jenny Jones (Green Party member of the London Assembly). The plans were resurrected by Johnson in 2016.

=== Incidents ===
On 5 October 1999, two trains on the Great Western Main Line near Ladbroke Grove crashed into each other at a combined speed of more than 130 miles per hour (210 km/h), leading to the diesel fuel of one of the trains igniting and setting fire to both. Thirty one people died and more than 400 were injured, including severe burns. The cause of the crash was determined to be lack of suitable visibility of signals. The crash, combined with further major incidents at Hatfield and Potters Bar, shook confidence in the British rail network.

=== Bus ===
Ladbroke Grove is served by London Buses routes 7, 23, 52, 70, 228, 295, 316, and N7.

== Notable residents ==
- Angus Gaye, better known as Drummie Zeb, of reggae band Aswad, grew up in the Ladbroke Grove area.
- Tom Brook, BBC News journalist was born in Ladbroke Grove.
- Rita Ora, British singer/songwriter grew up in Ladbroke Grove.
- AJ Tracey, rapper, best known for his song "Ladbroke Grove", grew up in Ladbroke Grove.
- Chrissie Hynde, American musician, lead vocalist with The Pretenders.
- Anthony Sampson, journalist and writer, 27 Ladbroke Grove.
- Hugh Thomas, historian, 29 Ladbroke Grove.
- Hayley Atwell, a British and American actress, most widely known for portraying Agent Peggy Carter.
- Digga D, rapper, member of CGM.
- Javine Hylton, singer, hailed from Ladbroke Grove.
- Lily Allen, British singer/songwriter lives in Ladbroke Grove.
- Cleo Sol, British singer/songwriter, member of Sault.
- Noel Clarke, British actor, writer and director known for his role in Doctor Who and for writing, directing and starring in the teen crime films Kidulthood, Adulthood and Brotherhood.
- Central Cee, rapper.

== See also ==
- Notting Hill
- North Kensington
- Kensal Green

== Notes and references ==
Citations

Sources

- Weinreb, Ben; Hibbert, Christopher; Keay, John; Keay, Julia, eds. (2008) [1983]. The London Encyclopaedia (Third ed.). Macmillan. ISBN 978-1-405-04924-5.

== Bibliography ==
- British History Online
- Barbara Denny, Notting Hill and Holland Park Past, Historical Publications, 1993. ISBN 0-948667-18-4
- Derry Moore, Notting Hill, Frances Lincoln Ltd, 2007, ISBN 978-0-7112-2739-2
