= Youth Projects =

Australian non profit organisation

Youth Projects is an independent, not-for-profit organisation founded in Melbourne, Australia. Youth Projects provides a broad range of services designed tackling social disadvantage, homelessness and drug and alcohol issues including health and education programs, community outreach and training and employment services.

Youth Projects operates a drop-in centre in Hosier Lane called The Living Room, and its main office is located in Glenroy.

== Origin ==
In 1981, the Broadmeadows City Council established a drop-in centre in a building at 6 Hartington Street, Glenroy. The centre was aimed at the young unemployed as a safe place to discuss their personal issues.

In 1984, with additional support from Commonwealth authorities and charitable trusts, the Broadmeadows Taskforce was established and officially opened by the Premier of Victoria, John Cain, on 28 August 1984.

At the end of 1984, the committee of management of the Broadmeadows Taskforce elected change its name to Broadmeadows Youth Projects. Following the group's incorporation, the organisation became known as Youth Projects Inc.

== Programs ==
=== Health programs ===
==== The Living Room ====
The Living Room is a Primary Health Service located in Hosier Lane that provides free healthcare and support to people who are homeless or at risk of homelessness or with complex healthcare needs. The Living Room is the only service of its kind in the CBD of Melbourne where people can receive medical attention, contraception, legal advice, as well as wash their clothes, shower and access the internet and send and receive mail.

==== Foot Patrol ====
Foot Patrol is a confidential mobile, street based, syringe exchange program that operates in the Melbourne CBD 365 days a year. It enables injecting drug users - who may not otherwise seek assistance - to access clean injecting equipment and contraception in their own, familiar environment.

==== Mobile Syringe Exchange ====
Mobile Syringe Exchange prevents the transmission of blood borne viruses through the provision of clean injecting equipment, safer using advice, safe syringe disposal units, contraception, safe sex information, support and referrals. Operating from a car

=== Outreach programs ===
==== YNOT ====
The Youth Northern Outreach Team provides drug and alcohol treatment for young people aged between 12 – 21 years of age.

=== Community programs ===
==== Clean Up ====
Clean Up is a syringe cleanup team that regularly conducts inspections across the Melbourne CBD to safely dispose discarded syringes.

==== Drink Drug Drive ====
Drink Drug Drive is an accredited education program to assist people who have lost their driving license as a result of driving under the influence of drugs or alcohol.

==== Living Room Football ====
The Youth Projects Living Room Roar is a football team comprising clients of the Living Room. The Living Room Roar are part of a competition run by Reclink. The aim of the football program is to promote health and physical, social and mental well-being, social inclusion and engagement. The Living Room Roar are supported by the Richmond Football Club, Victoria Police and YMCA.

=== Employment ===
==== Youth Projects Employment services ====
Youth Projects Employment services supports individuals with education and training while assisting them to secure ongoing employment.

=== Education ===
==== Youth Connections ====
Youth Connections is a program that supports young people at risk of disengaging from education. Youth Projects is part of a consortium that delivers this service.

=== Training ===
==== Melbourne Training Options ====
Melbourne Training Options is a registered training organisation that delivers courses to individual who want to increase their skills.

== Awards ==
Youth Projects was awarded the 2010 Melbourne Award for Contribution to the Community.
