= Slow Burn (David Bowie song) =

Song by David Bowie

Single by David Bowie

from the album Heathen
- B-side: "Wood Jackson" (7")
- Released: 3 June 2002
- Recorded: August–September 2001; January 2002
- Studio: Allaire (Shokan, New York); Looking Glass (New York City)
- Genre: Rock
- Length: 4:43 (album version); 3:55 (single edit)
- Label: ISO; Columbia
- Songwriter: David Bowie
- Producers: David Bowie; Tony Visconti

David Bowie singles chronology
"Seven" (2000)	"Slow Burn" (2002)	"Everyone Says 'Hi'" (2002)

Music video
- "Slow Burn" on YouTube

"Slow Burn" is a song by the English musician David Bowie. It was released as the lead single from his twenty-third studio album, Heathen, on 3 June 2002. The recording features Pete Townshend on guitar. The song's music evokes Bowie's 1970s works, particularly "'Heroes'" (1977). Many reviewers interpreted the track, along with several others on Heathen, as evoking the September 11 attacks, although Bowie denied any connections.

The single was only released in Europe and Japan. It charted low, barely breaking the top 70 in Austria and the Netherlands, but reached the top 20 in Italy. Bowie performed it twice on the Heathen Tour and several times on television throughout the year. A short music video, directed by Gary Koepke, promoted the album, while the full video was released online in 2016. The song received mostly positive reviews, with praise for Townshend's guest performance. It received a Grammy nomination for Best Male Rock Vocal Performance in 2003. It was covered by Films of Colour in 2011.

== Recording ==
"Slow Burn" was written by David Bowie and produced by Bowie and Tony Visconti. According to the author Benoît Clerc, the song's recording began during the initial sessions for Heathen at Allaire in Shokan, New York, between August and September 2001. However, Chris O'Leary states that the song's recording did not begin until the mixing and overdub sessions at Looking Glass Studios in New York City, between October 2001 and January 2002. O'Leary also says that "Slow Burn" was one of the last songs completed for Heathen.

The song features a guest performance by Pete Townshend of the Who on lead guitar. Townshend had previously guested on "Because You're Young" from Scary Monsters (and Super Creeps) (1980). The collaboration occurred following a meeting Townshend and Bowie had in October 2001 while preparing for the Concert for New York City. Bowie sent over the basic track to Townshend in London, where the guitarist recorded his part at his home studio before emailing it back to Bowie and Visconti in New York. Bowie described Townshend's performance as "the most eccentric and aggressive guitar I've heard Pete play, quite unlike anything else he's done recently". Townshend later told fans that Heathen was "surprising, moving, poetic, in a musical and visionary sense." The guitarist Gerry Leonard reportedly recorded a guitar solo for "Slow Burn" before it was replaced by Townshend's.

The song features piano by Kristeen Young, who told O'Leary that "they needed someone to play their piano line and I just happened to be at the studio. If it was up to me... I would have played something different as it's not my style of playing." Additionally, the Borneo Horns (Lenny Pickett, Stan Harrison and Steve Elson), last heard on Never Let Me Down (1987), contributed saxophone overdubs, recording their parts on 29 January 2002.

== Music and lyrics ==
"Slow Burn" musically harkens back to Bowie's 1970s works, particularly with saxophone playing; Nicholas Pegg finds it a modernised update of the R&B styles of "'Heroes'" (1977) and "Teenage Wildlife" (1980). Rolling Stone's David Fricke compared Townshend's guitar performance to that of Robert Fripp's on "'Heroes'". Q's David Quantick described the song as "a big old chunk of rock that makes nu-metal look neither metal nor nu". The lyrics express Bowie's accumulated feelings of what he described as "a low-level anxiety". Bowie cited the track as his favourite from the album, describing it as "moody and sad, with a strong R&B feel".

"Slow Burn", like "Sunday", "Slip Away" and "A Better Future", were cited by many reviewers at the time as having lyrics that referenced the September 11 attacks. The author James E. Perone argued that these tracks reflected a post-9/11 atmosphere, while O'Leary also believed its "prophetic" lyrics "invoke[d]" that day in New York City. Bowie denied any connections to the attacks, stating that all the songs were written beforehand and some, particularly "Slow Burn", reflected a general feeling of anxiety that he had accumulated living in America.

== Release ==
"Slow Burn" was released in mainland Europe and Japan as the lead single from Heathen on 3 June 2002; the single's UK release, originally scheduled for July, was cancelled. The standard CD single featured the outtakes "Wood Jackson" and "Shadow Man" as the B-sides, while the European maxi-CD release featured the two aforementioned tracks along with "When the Boys Come Marching Home" and "You've Got a Habit of Leaving". These releases featured the album version, while the shortened radio edit was included on a promotional CD, the Best of Bowie compilation album in 2002, and on the box set I Can't Give Everything Away (2002–2016) in 2025; a longer version originally on the SACD was also included on the latter. The single's cover photograph was taken by Markus Klinko and features Bowie striding forward with a baby in his arms. According to Klinko, the photo was a composite of two images: Bowie's head is grafted onto the body of a male model photographed separately.

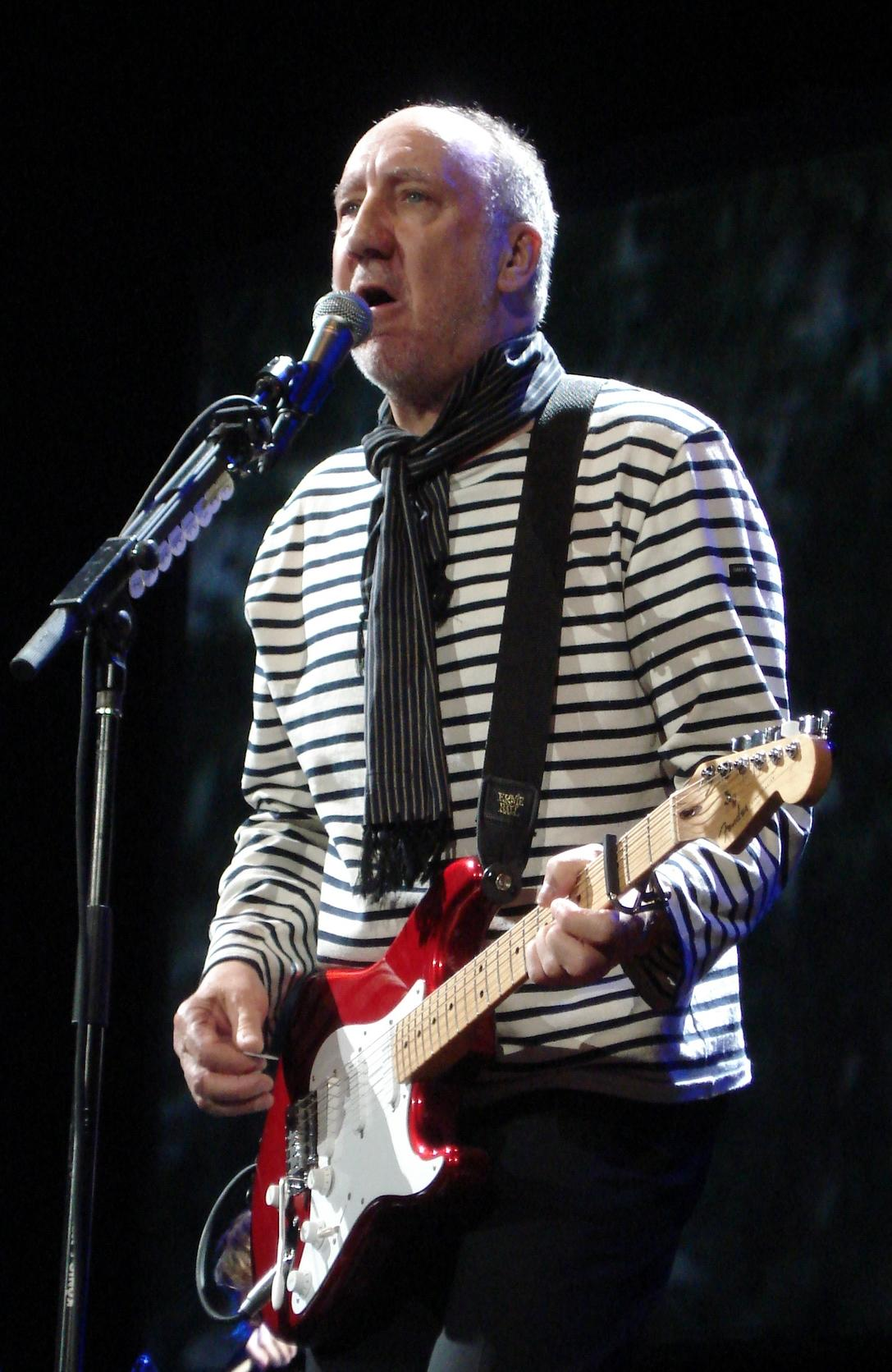
Many critics praised Pete Townshend's (pictured in 2008) guest guitar performance on the song.

"Slow Burn" received positive reviews from critics. Pegg praises the song as one of Heathen's strongest, highlighting Visconti's "razor-sharp" production that "abounds with splendid touches", while comparing Bowie's vocal treatment to the treatment done on "'Heroes'". Eric Carr of Pitchfork similarly called "Slow Burn" one of the album's strongest songs, describing it as "a moody, bouncy piece with a bass/sax combo that vaguely elicits a 60s pop undercurrent". He nevertheless felt Townshend's guitar part "never steps into the realm of being entirely gratuitous" and Bowie's vocals "are wisely left to dominate". Many reviews for the song highlighted Townshend's guest performance. At the 45th Annual Grammy Awards in 2003, "Slow Burn" was nominated for the Grammy Award for Best Male Rock Vocal Performance. In a list ranking every Bowie single, Ultimate Classic Rock placed "Slow Burn" at number 97 (out of 119).

"Slow Burn" was covered by Films of Colour in 2011. Their cover was praised by Bowie and Visconti, with the former posting their cover to his website and the latter publicly endorsing the band. Visconti said of their cover: "Films of Colour had altered it so much they had clearly made it their own. I think Bowie is one of the most difficult artists to cover, since his versions of his own compositions seem to be the definitive versions. After I heard Films of Colour's version, I was completely won over." In 2013, Brandon Flowers of the Killers told NME that the band used the bassline from "Slow Burn" for their 2004 single "All These Things That I've Done". He quipped that "enough time has probably passed now that I think he probably won't sue us!"

=== Music video ===
The music video of "Slow Burn" was directed by Gary Koepke. The video shows Bowie conversing with a young girl, played by the child actress Hayley Nicholas, in a recording booth that reveals itself to be in space. A 60-second clip was used as a television commercial to promote Heathen. The full 3:55 video remained unreleased until 2016, when it was posted to YouTube.

=== Live performances ===
Bowie performed "Slow Burn" live only twice on the Heathen Tour in 2002, with the second and last appearance at the UK Meltdown Festival on 29 June. It was performed more times on television programmes. On 2 June, Bowie and his band taped a performance of "Slow Burn" and other songs in a New York studio to be played on BBC's Top of the Pops. A second performance of "Slow Burn" was also recorded for promotional purposes. Additional performances of "Slow Burn" on television included on Late Show with David Letterman (on 10 June) and on Late Night with Conan O'Brien (on 19 June).

== Track listing ==
=== CDs ===
- ISO-Columbia / 672744 1 (Austria)
1. "Slow Burn" – 4:43
2. "Wood Jackson" – 4:48
3. "Shadow Man" – 4:46
- ISO-Columbia / COL 672744 2 (Austria)
1. "Slow Burn" – 4:43
2. "Wood Jackson" – 4:48
3. "Shadow Man" – 4:46
4. "When the Boys Come Marching Home" – 4:46
5. "You've Got a Habit of Leaving" – 4:51
- Sony / SICP-162 (Japan)
1. "Slow Burn" (edit) – 3:55
2. "Shadow Man" – 4:46
3. "When the Boys Come Marching Home" – 4:46
4. "You've Got a Habit of Leaving" – 4:51
5. "Baby Loves That Way" – 4:44

=== 7" Orange Vinyl ===
- ISO-Columbia / 672744 7 (Europe)
1. "Slow Burn"
2. "Wood Jackson"

== Personnel ==
According to Chris O'Leary and Benoît Clerc:

- David Bowie – lead and backing vocals, synthesisers
- Pete Townshend – lead guitar
- Tony Visconti – bass guitar, backing vocal
- Kristeen Young – piano
- Sterling Campbell – drums, tambourine
- The Borneo Horns:

- Lenny Pickett – tenor saxophone
- Stan Harrison – alto saxophone
- Steve Elson – baritone saxophone

Technical

- David Bowie – producer
- Tony Visconti – producer, engineer
- Brandon Mason – assistant engineer (Allaire Studios)
- Todd Vos – assistant engineer (Allaire Studios)
- Hector Castillo – assistant engineer (Looking Glass Studios)
- Christian Rutledge – assistant engineer (Looking Glass Studios)

== Charts ==
Chart performance for "Slow Burn"
Chart (2002)	Peak position
Austria (Ö3 Austria Top 40)	69
Canada (Nielsen SoundScan)	33
Netherlands (Single Top 100)	69
Italy (FIMI)	16
Italy (Musica e dischi)	29
Switzerland (Schweizer Hitparade)	80
UK Singles (Official Charts)	94
US Adult Alternative Airplay (Billboard)	19
