= Gary Koepke =

American businessman (1955–2024)

Gary Koepke (November 14, 1955 – March 20, 2024) was a creative director and co-founder of the Boston-based creative and communications agency Modernista!-

== Early career ==
Koepke began his career working with a number of major publications and brands. He served as founding creative director of Vibe magazine and produced award-winning works including 26 magazine for AGFA, the design of Musician magazine, Benetton's Colors magazine, World Tour for Dun & Bradstreet Software, and SoHo Journal for SoHo Partnership.

He served as SVP, Creative Director for J.Crew, and Creative Director for Wieden+Kennedy Portland, where he helped open that agency's New York office. Koepke designed David Byrne's book of photography, Strange Ritual; directed the "Slow Burn" music video for David Bowie; and directed the U2 video "Window in the Skies," which was named Best Video at the Los Angeles Film Festival. He also worked with DJ Paul Oakenfold to create the visuals for his 2008 World Tour.

== Modernista! ==
Koepke founded Modernista! with Lance Jensen in 2000. Modernista! is an independent agency with clients such as Sears, Product (RED), the National Park Foundation, Nickelodeon, Food Should Taste Good, Chug, Sophos, Jack Wills, Boulder Digital Works, Doc to Dock, Stop Handgun Violence, and The Art Institute of Boston. In the past, Modernista! has created marketing campaigns for clients such as General Motors, Palm, Showtime TIAA-CREF, Napster, Gap, Anheuser-Busch, MTV, and Converse.

Modernista! was named Regional Agency of the Year by AdWeek in 2004 and has won many other industry and creative awards. One version of its website was a finalist in the Webby Awards and the SXSW Web Awards. The website was also selected for the Communication Arts Interactive Annual and the ID Design Annual and was recognized by the D&AD Awards. In addition, Modernista!'s redesign of BusinessWeek magazine took first place at the International Design Awards.

In its final years, Modernista! moved into digital marketing, communications, and social media. One of its more unique final projects was an alternative reality game leading up to Season Five of the Dexter TV show.

In spring 2011, Modernista! shuttered its doors due to the sudden exit of co-founder Lance Jensen.

== SapientNitro ==
Fifteen months after Modernista! shut down, Koepke joined SapientNitro as global ECD of brand content innovation.

== Personal life ==
Koepke was also a musician and painter. His work has been shown at the DNP Gallery in Japan. He died on March 20, 2024.
