= Films of Colour =

- Origin: London, England
- Genres: Alternative rock, electronic, indie rock,
- Years active: 2008–present
- Labels: Label Fandango (UK), Believe Digital (UK), Square Peg Records

Films of Colour were an English alternative rock band, formed in 2008 at the Academy of Contemporary Music in Guildford, England. They originally started gigging under the name of Spires but as there were other bands already established by this name, they later changed their name to Films of Colour. After seeing them at their second gig, they were taken under the wing of Phil Catchpole (Relentless Records) where he developed their sound and put them in the studio and finally on tour with Cage the Elephant. Paul Carey joined the band as a Co-Manager in 2009, but when Phil Catchpole left in 2010, Paul Carey continued on and took command as their sole manager. On 4 October 2010, the band released their first single "Actions" with the B-side "Circles" (both produced/mixed by Duncan "Pixie" Mills (Florence and the Machine). The single was released digitally and on limited edition 7" Vinyl by Fierce Panda's sister label – Label Fandango. The band's sound were compared to acts such as Radiohead, Muse, Coldplay, early Bloc Party and Swedish act – Miike Snow. Simon Williams, head of Fierce panda described the band "as the best band he's signed since Radiohead and Coldplay". Picked up as The Guardian's New Band of the Day, Best of Myspace Winners, The Independent newspaper's Barometer: One to Watch and Steve Lamacq's Favourite New Band. There was radio support from 6 Music, Absolute Radio, BBC Radio 2 as well as holding the number 1 spot for two weeks on Amazing Radio They split in 2013 and after parting ways two original members went on to create a new band. James Hatcher and Andrew Clutterbuck now tour and perform under the name Honne.

Jack Allinson performed with Aloosh and James Rees-Flynn toured with Emma Stevens

== David Bowie and Tony Visconti ==
In 2011, the band released a cover of David Bowie's song "Slow Burn", from his 2002 album Heathen. The band received personal endorsement from the song's producer Tony Visconti. It was picked up by Bowie's official website and listed as an exclusive download.

Visconti said in an interview:

"When I was given a batch of demos to consider working with Films of Colour, I was struck with how many catchy songs they had written. I was also impressed with the quality of their demos; that they were clever, creative lads was very apparent. But one song stuck out, sounding so familiar yet I didn't really recognise it until the second chorus. I knew the song because I produced it with David Bowie for his 2002 Heathen album release. But Films of Colour had altered it so much they had clearly made it their own. I think Bowie is one of the most difficult artists to cover, since his versions of his own compositions seem to be the definitive versions. After I heard Films of Colour's version, I was completely won over."

This endorsement brought the band great exposure and shot the band into the public eye, getting features in the Evening Standard, NME online and Q online hot list.

== Capital/Persinette ==
In May 2011, the band entered back into Studio 1 at Strongroom Studios, Shoreditch with producer Duncan "Pixie" Mills and Tom Bailey to record their next single A-side "Capital" along with B-Side "Persinette". This had its first airplay on Q Radio (July 2011) as well as the Selector Radio show which was broadcast in over 29 Countries worldwide and to an estimated audience of over 2 million listeners by The British Council. Featured in the Londonist as "the most 'Londony' song", Capital/Persinette was released on 25 July 2011 on Believe Records.

== In popular media ==
In October 2010, "Actions" by Films of Colour, was used as backing music for Matt Cardle in the series of The X Factor (UK) In December 2011, "Persinette" by Films of Colour, was used as backing music in the Christmas special of UK's E4 show – Made in Chelsea.

== Festival appearances ==
Films of Colour have appeared at numerous music festivals nationwide including the Isle of Wight Festival 2010, In the City 2010, The Great Escape 2009, they also headlined a venue on their debut appearance at the 2011 Camden Crawl. 2011 also saw the band play the mainstage at Y Not Festival 2011, along with headliners Maxïmo Park and shared the stage with Fenech-Soler at Fieldview Festival.

== SXSW Festival 2012 ==
In 2012, the band appeared at the prestigious emerging music festival, which is held annually in Austin, Texas. They made several high-profile appearances, including a spot on BMI's evening showcase at Easy Tiger Patio on 15 March 2012.

After being announced on the official SXSW website in 2011, the band have gone on to be featured in many lists as "Ones to watch", including being voted No. 1 in the 10 for 2012 readers poll conducted by influential UK music blog There Goes the Fear in late 2011.
