= Modernista! =

Creative and communications agency based in Boston, Massachusetts

Modernista! LLC
- Company type: Independent
- Industry: Advertising, Marketing
- Founded: 2000
- Headquarters: Boston, Massachusetts, USA
- Number of locations: 0 (Agency closed)
- Website: http://www.modernista.com/

Modernista! was a creative and communications agency based in Boston, Massachusetts. The agency represented Sears, Showtime, Product (RED), the National Park Foundation, Nickelodeon, Food Should Taste Good, Chug, Sophos, Jack Wills, Boulder Digital Works, Doc to Dock, Stop Handgun Violence, the Art Institute of Boston, General Motors, and TIAA-CREF.

In its later years, the agency increasingly focused on interactive design. It also involved itself in other types of creative projects, including music videos, magazine redesign, and alternate reality gaming. According to co-founder Gary Koepke, the agency modified its business model and operated less as an advertising agency than as a creative think tank.

== History ==
Modernista! is now closed. The agency was launched in January 2000 by Gary Koepke and Lance Jensen, both from marketing/advertising backgrounds. Jensen left the company in December 2010 and now works for Hill Holliday.

In October 2000, Modernista! was appointed agency of record for General Motors’ HUMMER, and in 2006 it was named the agency for GM’s Cadillac. The relationship with both brands ended when GM went bankrupt in 2009. Following this, Modernista! revamped its organization and became much more focused on digital marketing and communications than it had been.

== Activities ==
According to Bruce Horovitz, writing in the November 4, 2008 issue of USA Today, Modernista! was known "for linking music from often obscure artists with compelling visuals in its TV spots." In the print arena, one of the agency’s most visible projects involves the display of advertisements for the Stop Handgun Violence gun-control organization on a 252-foot-long billboard erected along the Massachusetts Turnpike in Boston. Digital projects include web sites and microsites for Sears, HUMMER, Cadillac, Nickelodeon, Boulder Digital Works, Product (RED), the National Park Foundation, and the Art Institute of Boston.

In efforts outside traditional advertising, Modernista! created music videos for David Bowie ("Slow Burn," 2006) and U2 ("Window in the Skies," 2007) and designed computer visuals for concerts by trance DJ Paul Oakenfold. In 2008, the agency redesigned BusinessWeek magazine. It has also done strategic planning consulting for the Bill & Melinda Gates Foundation. In 2010, the agency produced an alternate reality game leading up to season five of the Dexter TV show.

In January 2004, Modernista! was named "Regional Agency of the Year" by Adweek.

== Controversies ==
In March 2008, Modernista! gained attention for a redesign of its own website, which now displayed only a small red navigation menu overlaid on the upper left corner of social-site pages that contained information about or from Modernista!, including Facebook, Flickr, and YouTube. With each new visit to www.modernista.com, one of these social sites was chosen at random to provide the agency’s "launch page." In addition to the social sites, the agency’s blog page could appear on a random basis. In effect, outside of its blog, Modernista! referred visitors exclusively to social media to learn about the agency.

At one time, this "siteless site" (which won a Webby award in 2009) could utilize the Wikipedia entry for Modernista! as a landing page. Wikipedia’s Jimmy Wales asked Modernista! to stop using its Wikipedia article in this fashion. Following this, Wikipedia implemented technology that made it difficult to make such use of an entry, and the Modernista! site stopped routing to Wikipedia.
