= Markowicz Fine Art =

- Established: 1 January 2010
- Location: 110 NE 40th St, Miami, FL 33137
- Coordinates: 25.8132669°N 80.1952849°W
- Type: Art Museum
- Owner: Bernard Markowicz
- Website: markowiczfineart.com

Markowicz Fine Art is an American contemporary art gallery owned by the French art dealer Bernard Markowicz.

== History ==
Bernard Markowicz opened his first gallery in 2010 in the heart of the Miami Design District.

== Exhibitions ==
In February 2016, one month after the death of David Bowie Markowicz Fine Art unveiled Unseen David Bowie Photos by Markus Klinko. 7 years later, in Dallas, Markowicz Fine Art is presenting again Markus Klinko in a show named "Bowie, Beyonce and Beyond"

The gallery has exhibited works by Kai, Alain Godon, Markus Klinko, Idan Zareski, Carole Feuerman, Arno Elias, Reine Paradis, and Maurce Renoma, and Richard Orlinski.

For Art Miami 2021 Markowicz Fine Art introduced KAI's collection of artworks with the theme, "Before It's Too Late".

== Other locations ==
=== Dallas ===
In September 2019, Markowicz opened his second gallery in Dallas, Texas.

=== Laguna Niguel ===
Bernard Markowicz has announced the opening of the third gallery of the network for summer 2021, in Laguna Niguel, California.

French artist Alain Godon introduced the QT series at the Laguna Niguel gallery in April 2022.
