= You've Got a Habit of Leaving =

1965 single by David Bowie as Davy Jones

- Reissue compilation sleeve

Single by Davy Jones
- B-side: "Baby Loves That Way"
- Released: 20 August 1965
- Recorded: July 1965
- Studio: IBC, London
- Genre: Rock; freakbeat
- Length: 2:35
- Label: Parlophone
- Songwriter: Davy Jones (David Bowie)
- Producer: Shel Talmy

David Bowie singles chronology
"I Pity the Fool" (1964)	"You've Got a Habit of Leaving" (1965)	"Can't Help Thinking About Me" (1966)

"You've Got a Habit of Leaving" is a song by the English singer-songwriter David Bowie, recorded and released as a single on 20 August 1965 through Parlophone. Released under the name Davy Jones, it featured his band at the time, the Lower Third, whose contributions were uncredited. Produced by Shel Talmy and recorded in early July 1965, the single marked a departure from the Americanised R&B of his two earlier singles into Who-style mod music. The original recording later appeared on the compilation albums Early On (1964–1966) (1991), Nothing Has Changed (2014) and The Shel Talmy Recordings (2026).

Over thirty years after its initial release, Bowie re-recorded the song during the sessions for Toy in mid-2000, along with other tracks he wrote and recorded during the mid-1960s. After the project was shelved, the remake was released as a B-side in 2002 and 2003, and before it was officially released in 2021 as part of the Brilliant Adventure (1992–2001) box set.

== Recording and style ==
David Bowie, performing under the name Davy Jones, made his live debut with the Lower Third in June 1965. They gained little notice and by July, Bowie convinced his manager, Leslie Conn, to strike a recording deal with Shel Talmy, who would produce a new single in order to raise the group's profile. Talmy, who had produced singles for the Who at the time, was impressed with Bowie's composition "You've Got a Habit of Leaving", and agreed to produce a single for Parlophone. Bowie demoed the track in the early 1960s, telling photographer Mick Rock in 1972: "The first song I ever demoed was 'You've Got a Habit of Leaving Me'. I'd saved up about £2 to hire a demo studio. Touted it around everywhere. Nobody wanted to know."

The session for "You've Got a Habit of Leaving", along with the chosen B-side "Baby Loves That Way", was conducted in early July 1965 at IBC Studios in London. The recording featured pianist Nicky Hopkins and was engineered by Glyn Johns. According to Kevin Cann, there were frequent disagreements between Bowie and Talmy during the session. Bowie also attempted to have the backing vocals performed in the style of a "monks' chant", although the idea was discarded after the first attempt.

Under Talmy's influence, the band crafted a sound similar to the Who, particularly their songs "Anyway, Anyhow, Anywhere" and "I Can't Explain", later covered by Bowie in 1973 for Pin Ups. According to biographer Chris O'Leary, Bowie mimicked the Who's lead singer Roger Daltrey in his vocal performance for "You've Got a Habit of Leaving". Paul Trynka notes that he abandoned the distinctive vocal style he displayed on "I Pity the Fool". Structurally, the song also takes influence from the Who's "My Generation" and the Kinks' "Tired of Waiting for You". Regarding the Who's influence, Bowie stated in an interview with Q magazine in 1993:

We had a thing about the Who. In fact, we used to play second support for them down in Bournemouth. That was the first time I met [Pete] Townshend and got talking to him about songwriting and stuff. I was hugely influenced by him. We had songs called 'Baby Loves That Way', 'You've Got a Habit of Leaving' – some really duff things. Townshend came into our soundcheck and listened to a couple of things and said, 'You're trying to write like me!' I said: 'Yeah, what do you think?' He said: 'Mmm, well, there's a lot of bands around like you at the moment'. I don't think he was very impressed.

== Release ==
In July 1965, shortly before the single's release, the band attempted to generate publicity for themselves by publishing a letter in Melody Maker. Written by bassist Graham Rivens and published as Jennifer Taylor, guitarist Denis Taylor's sister, the letter read: "The Who are only bordering on this new sound. If they want the real thing, listen to Davy Jones and the Lower Third from London." Bowie also parted ways with Conn during this time, hiring Ralph Horton, a promoter for the Moody Blues, as his new manager. Bowie and the Lower Third then performed various live sets in London before the single's release.

"You've Got a Habit of Leaving" was released through Parlophone on 20 August 1965, with the catalogue number R 5315 and backed by "Baby Loves That Way". The single was solely credited to "Davy Jones" (rather than "Davie"); the Lower Third was credited for their next and final single, "Can't Help Thinking About Me". The single, which included a press release from Parlophone discussing the band, failed to chart. The same day the single released, the Lower Third performed at the Bournemouth Pavilion where they were billed with the Who. Before their set, the Who guitarist Pete Townshend made an appearance, where he noted the similarities between the two bands' styles. Bowie continued to perform the song during his live sets throughout 1965 and 1966.

"You've Got a Habit of Leaving" was later included on the compilations Early On (1964–1966) (1991) and Nothing Has Changed (2014). A remastered version and a recording with an alternate vocal was featured on The Shel Talmy Recordings in 2026. In a 2016 list ranking every Bowie single from worst to best, Ultimate Classic Rock placed "You've Got a Habit of Leaving" at number 114 (out of 119). Another version of the track, titled the "Alternate Outtake Version", was released on the 2017 compilation Making Time–A Shel Talmy Production.

== Toy version ==
"You've Got a Habit of Leaving"

Promotional single by David Bowie

from the album Toy
- Released: 29 September 2021
- Recorded: July–October 2000
- Studio: Sear Sound and Looking Glass, New York City
- Length: 4:48
- Label: ISO/Parlophone
- Songwriter: David Bowie
- Producers: David Bowie, Mark Plati

Bowie re-recorded "You've Got a Habit of Leaving" during the sessions for the Toy project between July and October 2000, along with other tracks Bowie wrote and recorded during the mid-1960s, including "Baby Loves That Way" and "Can't Help Thinking About Me". The lineup consisted of the members of Bowie's then-touring band: guitarist Earl Slick, bassist Gail Ann Dorsey, pianist Mike Garson, musician Mark Plati and drummer Sterling Campbell. Co-produced by Bowie and Plati, the band rehearsed the songs at Sear Sound Studios in New York City before recording them as live tracks. Plati stated that he refused to listen to Bowie's original recordings of the tracks, so to prevent the originals from influencing his playing on the new versions. Overdubs were recorded at New York's Looking Glass Studios.

Toy was initially intended for release in March 2001, before it was shelved by EMI/Virgin due to financial issues. So, Bowie departed the label and recorded his next album Heathen (2002). The remake of "You've Got a Habit of Leaving" appeared on formats of the "Slow Burn" single, and later as a B-side of "Everyone Says 'Hi'". In March 2011, tracks from the Toy sessions, including "You've Got a Habit of Leaving", were leaked online, attracting media attention. The leaked version differed from the single releases, including a count-in from Bowie before Slick's guitar solo.

On 29 September 2021, Warner Music Group announced that Toy would get an official release on 26 November as part of the box set Brilliant Adventure (1992–2001) through ISO and Parlophone. "You've Got a Habit of Leaving" was released as a digital single the same day. A separate deluxe edition, titled Toy:Box, was released on 7 January 2022, which contains two new mixes of the song: an "alternate mix" and an "Unplugged and Somewhat Slightly Electric" mix, featuring new guitar parts by Plati and Slick.

== Personnel ==
According to Chris O'Leary and Benoît Clerc:

Original version

- David Bowie (as Davy Jones) – vocals, harmonica
- Denis Taylor – lead guitar, backing vocals
- Graham Rivens – bass
- Phil Lancaster – drums
- Nicky Hopkins – piano
- Shel Talmy – backing vocals
- Leslie Conn – backing vocals
- Glyn Johns – backing vocals

Technical

- Shel Talmy – producer
- Glyn Johns – engineer

Toy version

- David Bowie – vocals, producer
- Earl Slick – lead and acoustic guitar
- Mark Plati – rhythm and acoustic guitar
- Gail Ann Dorsey – bass, backing vocals
- Mike Garson – piano
- Sterling Campbell – drums
- Lisa Germano – violin
- Holly Palmer – backing vocals
- Emm Gryner – backing vocals
