= Heathen (David Bowie album) =

2002 studio album by David Bowie

Studio album by David Bowie
- Released: 10 June 2002
- Recorded: August 2001 – January 2002
- Studios: Allaire, Shokan, New York; Looking Glass, New York City; Sub Urban, London
- Genres: Art rock; art pop
- Length: 52:08
- Labels: ISO; Columbia
- Producers: David Bowie; Tony Visconti; Mark Plati; Gary Miller; Brian Rawling

David Bowie chronology
All Saints (2001)	Heathen (2002)	Best of Bowie (2002)

Singles from Heathen
- 1. "Slow Burn" Released: 3 June 2002; 2. "Everyone Says 'Hi'" Released: 16 September 2002; 3. "I've Been Waiting for You" Released: September 2002 (Canada only)

Heathen (stylised uǝɥʇɐǝɥ) is the twenty-third studio album by the English musician David Bowie, originally released in Europe on 10 June 2002, and the following day in America. It was his first release through his own ISO label. It reunited Bowie with the producer Tony Visconti for the two's first full-album collaboration since 1980. Recording took place at New York studios from August 2001 to January 2002 and featured guest musicians including Dave Grohl and Pete Townshend. Two tracks, "Afraid" and "Slip Away", evolved from Bowie's shelved Toy project, while three were covers of songs by Pixies, Neil Young and the Legendary Stardust Cowboy.

Musically, Heathen displays an art rock and art pop sound reminiscent of Bowie's 1970s works. The spiritual lyrics, reflected in the artwork and packaging, were based on his accumulated feelings of dread, thoughts on ageing and hopes for a better future for his newborn daughter. Commentators interpreted some tracks, particularly "Sunday" and "Slow Burn", as partial responses to the September 11 attacks, although Bowie denied any influence.

Boosted by a vast marketing campaign and promotional appearances, Heathen reached number five in the United Kingdom and became his highest-charting album in the United States since 1984, reaching number 14. The single "Everyone Says 'Hi'" reached number 20 in the UK. Bowie supported the album on the Heathen Tour throughout mid-2002, performing Heathen in its entirety at several shows.

Heathen represented a creative and commercial resurgence for Bowie following a period of experimentation in the 1990s. It was his most well-received album in years, being praised as a return to form and his best since Scary Monsters (1980). His biographers have commended Bowie's ability to update his older sound for a modern setting and recognise it as one of the finest of his later career.

== Background and writing ==
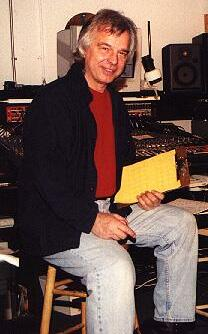
Heathen reunited Bowie and Tony Visconti (pictured c. 2000) for the first time since 1980.

In 2000, David Bowie recorded Toy, a collection of remade songs he wrote in the 1960s with a couple of new tracks. Originally slated for release in March 2001, the project was shelved due to financial troubles encumbering EMI/Virgin. (Note: Leaked in 2011, the Toy project saw official release as part of the Brilliant Adventure (1992–2001) box set in 2021.) In the meantime, Bowie began work on a new album with his former producer Tony Visconti, the duo's first full-length collaboration since Scary Monsters (and Super Creeps) (1980). After not speaking to each other for almost 20 years, (Note: The two had a falling out after Bowie chose Nile Rodgers to produce Let's Dance (1983).) the two reconciled in 1998 and recorded various one-off projects before reuniting for a full album. Both men were eager to work with each other again, with Visconti stating: "It was only in very recent years, around the time he made contact again, that I realised how much I missed him. We both had grown and changed, so the time was right to open the channels again."

Bowie spent the spring of 2001 writing compositions alone at New York City's Looking Glass Studios. Wanting to utilise songwriting techniques he had used across his entire career, he aimed to create a collection of "serious songs to be sung" and "a personal, cultural restoration". Visconti was impressed with Bowie's expanded knowledge of melodic and harmonic structures. The writing stint resulted in his first solely-written album since 1993's The Buddha of Suburbia. Bowie contributed the track "Nature Boy" to the soundtrack to the movie Moulin Rouge! (2001), in which some of his own songs also appeared. Personal events in Bowie's life, including the birth of his daughter, Alexandria, in August 2000, and the deaths of his mother Margaret and friend Freddie Buretti in April and May 2001, respectively, deeply affected him and influenced some of the new material. In June, Bowie moved into Visconti's home in West Nyack, New York, where the two spent time working on songs using Pro Tools.

== Recording and production ==
=== Initial sessions ===
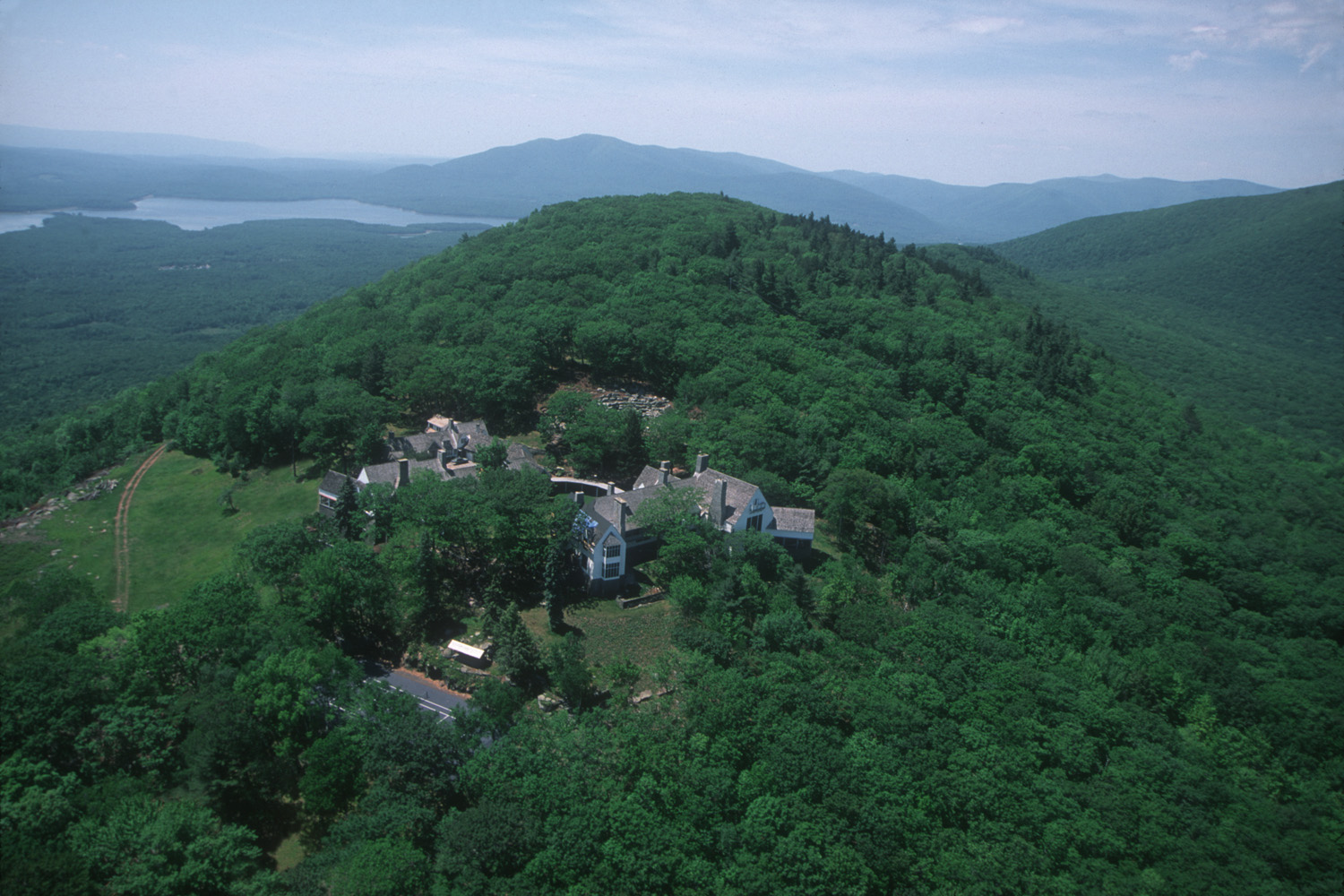
A view of Glen Tonche in the Catskill Mountains, where Heathen was recorded.

At the suggestion of the guitarist David Torn, Bowie and Visconti chose Allaire Studios in Shokan, New York to record the album. Located on the estate of Glen Tonche on top of Mount Tonche in the Catskill Mountains, the studio had 40-foot tall ceilings and a view of the Ashokan Reservoir. Although Bowie had preferred more urban areas, such as New York City or Berlin, the location's isolationism influenced the tracks "Sunday" and "Heathen (The Rays)". He told Interview magazine:

Walking through the door, everything that my album should be about was galvanized for me into one focal point. Even though I couldn't express it in words right at that second, I knew what the lyrics were already. They were all suddenly accumulated in my mind. It was an 'on-the-road-to-Damascus' type of experience, you know? It was almost like my feet were lifted off the ground.

Recording commenced in August 2001 and continued into September. The lineup consisted of Bowie, Visconti and the drummer Matt Chamberlain, whom the two had met while scouting at the studio; Torn contributed guitar parts in September. The trio finished 19 pieces in about two weeks, one of which was a remake of the Toy track "Uncle Floyd", now titled "Slip Away". Bowie explained to Time Out magazine that he was adamant about working with musicians neither he nor Visconti had worked with before. Bowie himself contributed more instrumentation on Heathen than any studio album "since Diamond Dogs [1974] or maybe Low [1977]"; he played guitar, saxophone, stylophone, keyboards, drums and the same EMS AKS synthesiser he used on Low. (Note: Originally owned by Brian Eno, Eno gifted the synthesiser to Bowie in 1999.) Visconti also brought back the vocal effect previously utilised on "'Heroes'" (1977) for "Sunday" and "I Would Be Your Slave", wherein three microphones were set up at different distances from the singer, each opening up when Bowie sang at the appropriate volume.

=== Overdubs and mixing ===
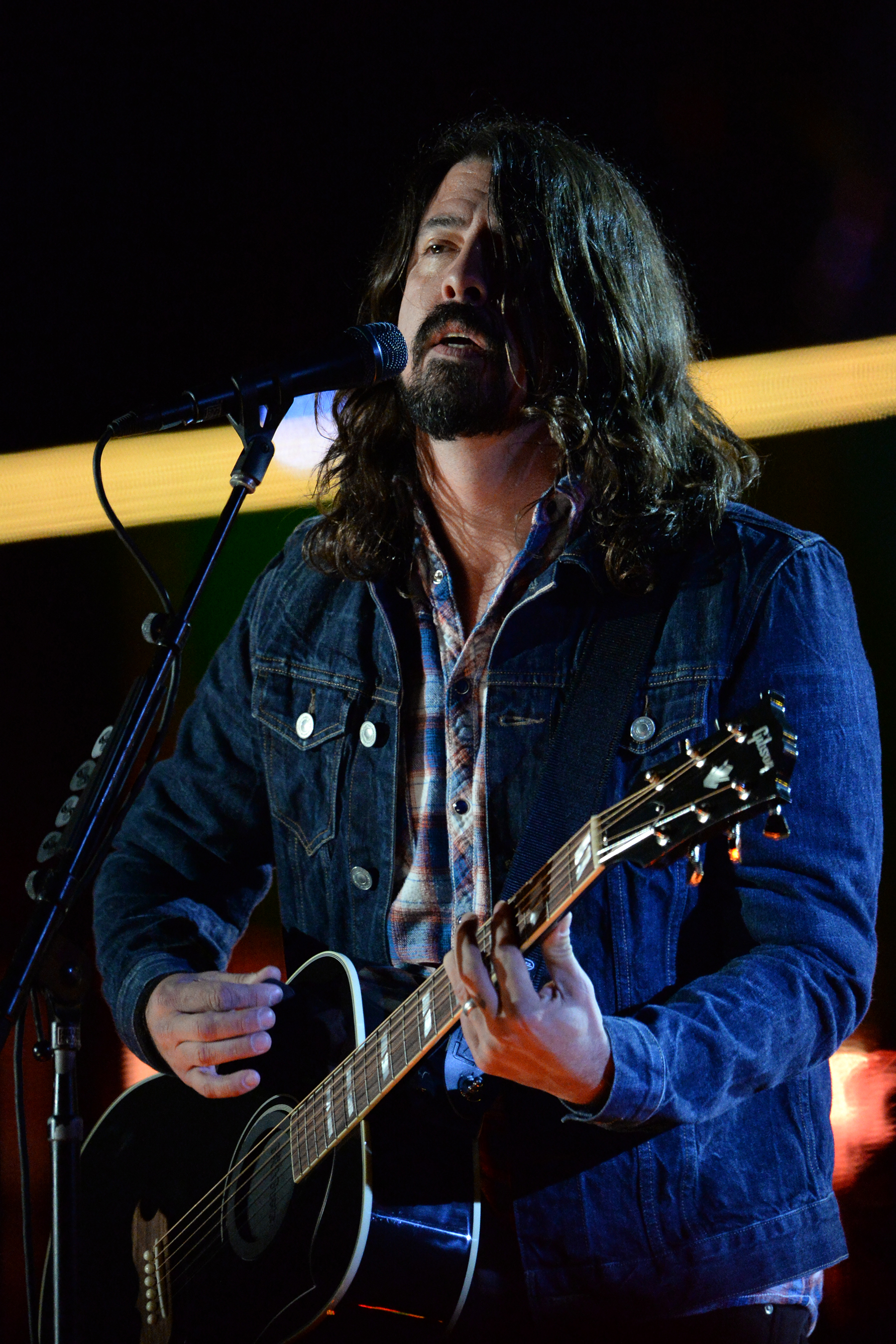
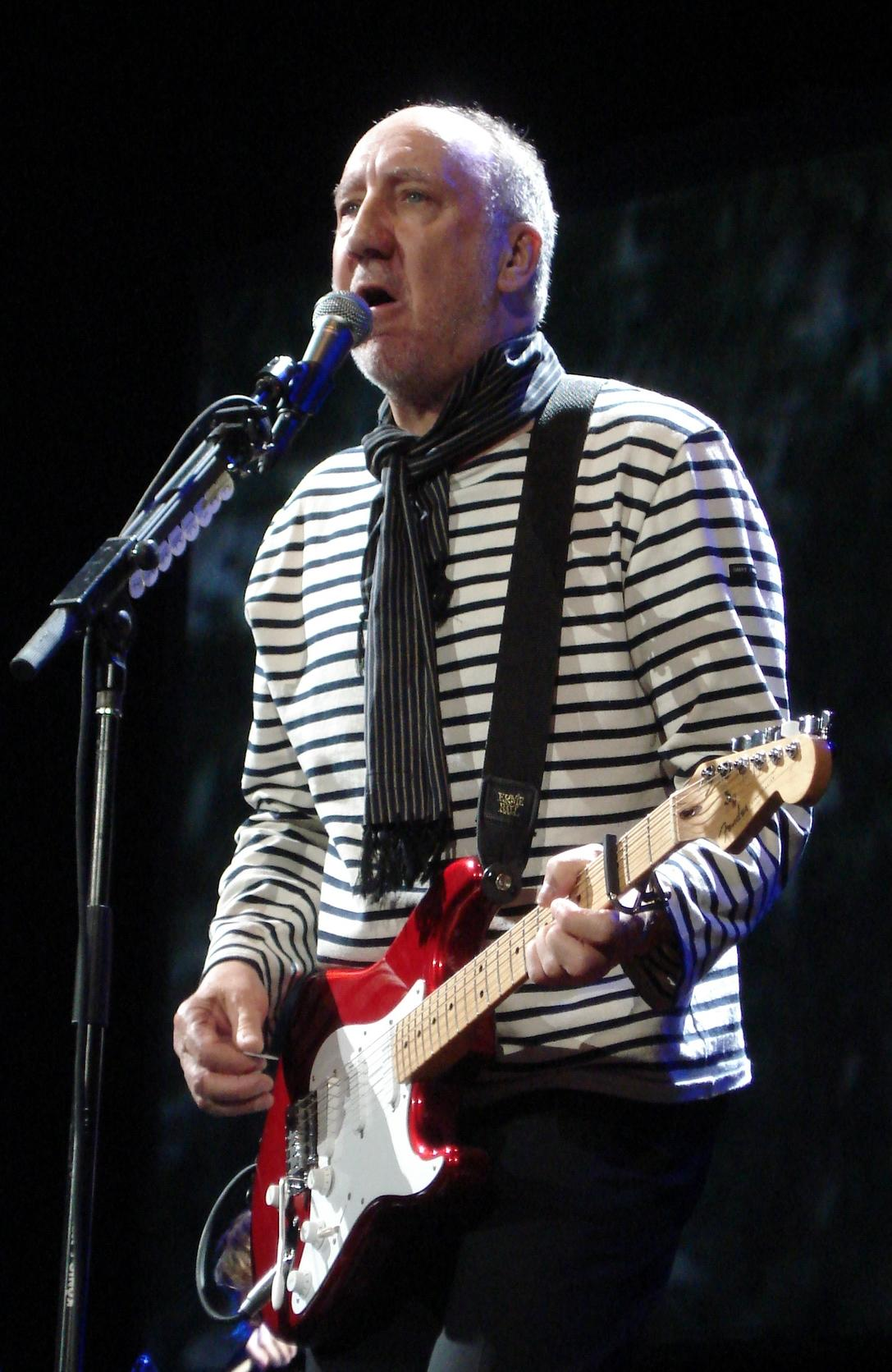
Musicians who contributed overdubs to Heathen included Dave Grohl (left, in 2014) on "I've Been Waiting for You" and Pete Townshend (right, in 2008) on "Slow Burn".

Bowie invited several musicians to Allaire to contribute overdubs. They included the Toy guitarist Gerry Leonard, Visconti's associate singer Kristeen Young and the keyboardist Jordan Rudess, who had worked with Bowie and Visconti during their pre-Toy sessions. Rudess revealed at the time: "Bowie doesn't like a lot of options. He has a good idea of how he wants the end result to sound, so practically what's on his demo is close to what he wants." Bowie's former guitarist Carlos Alomar, last seen on the 1995 Outside Tour, contributed overdubs in mid-October. Additionally, Foo Fighters' frontman Dave Grohl guested on a cover of Neil Young's "I've Been Waiting for You", having performed with Bowie at his 50th birthday concert in January 1997, while the Who's Pete Townshend played parts for "Slow Burn". Townshend, who guested on "Because You're Young" from Scary Monsters, later told fans that Heathen was "surprising, moving, poetic, in a musical and visionary sense."

Mixing for Heathen began at Looking Glass in October 2001. Here, Visconti reworked the Mark Plati-produced Toy track "Afraid" to have it match the new material. He, Bowie and Alomar also recorded vocals and guitars for "Everyone Says 'Hi'", which was completed at Sub Urban Studios in London with production by Brian Rawling and Gary Miller. Miller said that he primarily worked off the vocals: "It started off like a remix, but ended up as a fully-fledged production." Overdubbing continued on and off until January 2002. Visconti added contributions from the Scorchio Quartet (Greg Kitzis, Meg Okura, Martha Mooke, Mary Wooten), who previously played with Bowie at the Tibet House Benefit Concert in February 2000, and the Borneo Horns (Lenny Pickett, Stan Harrison, Steve Elson), last seen on Never Let Me Down (1987). Other credited players on Heathen include the drummer Sterling Campbell and the bassist Tony Levin of King Crimson.

Outtakes from the sessions included "Wood Jackson", "When the Boys Came Marching Home", "Fly" and a new version of "Safe", a track Bowie and Visconti recorded for The Rugrats Movie in 1998, but ultimately cut from the film. Bowie later remarked that "the hard part was knowing which songs not to include [on the final album]".

== Music and lyrics ==
The standard edition of Heathen contains 12 songs: nine originals and three covers. Two of the covers were originally slated for an abandoned sequel to Bowie's 1973 covers album Pin Ups: Young's "I've Been Waiting for You", taken from his 1969 eponymous debut album, and "I Took a Trip on a Gemini Spaceship" by Norman Odam, or the Legendary Stardust Cowboy, from whom Bowie lifted part of his Ziggy Stardust moniker in 1972. The final cover is "Cactus" by the Pixies, taken from their debut album Surfer Rosa (1988). In his book Strange Fascination, David Buckley discusses the album's musically diversity, from the "edgy rock" of Scary Monsters ("Cactus"), techno ("I Took a Trip on a Gemini Spaceship"), American punk ("I've Been Waiting For You"), drum and bass ballad ("I Would Be Your Slave"), riff rock ("Afraid"), quasi-reggae ("5.15 The Angels Have Gone") and 1971-era pop ("Everyone Says 'Hi'"). Other reviewers have classified Heathen as art rock and art pop. Compared to previous albums, the songs feature ties between the melodies, harmonies and arrangements, predominantly on "Sunday", "Slip Away" and "Afraid". Bowie said he wanted to capture the mood of Bob Dylan's Time Out of Mind (1997), and based "Sunday", "Heathen (The Rays)", "I Would Be Your Slave" and "5.15 The Angels Have Gone" off of Richard Strauss's Four Last Songs.

Thematically, Heathen continues the spirituality of Outside (1995), Earthling (1997) and Hours (1999). Depicting a godless world, the record also presents Bowie's reflections on ageing. He told Interview that once you reach a certain age, you realise "you're not growing anymore", "your body's strength is diminishing" and once aware, "you've got to let it go". Comparing Heathen and Hours, author Dave Thompson says that both share similar moods, reflections and "deep, personal beauty". However, compared to the melancholic nostalgia that pervaded Hours, biographer Nicholas Pegg says that Heathen focuses on feelings of existential dread, particularly on "Sunday", "Afraid" and "Heathen (The Rays)". Pegg also analyses the feeling of anxiety, stating that unlike Diamond Dogs and Station to Station (1976), throughout Heathen the anxiety is of "a happy, fulfilled mind struggling to come to terms with intimations of mortality". Bowie elaborated in Interview: "It's a head-spinning dichotomy of the lust for life against the finality of everything." He also defined the album's protagonist as a lost 21st-century man.

=== Connections with 9/11 ===
It was all written before. Every single song [...] I don't want it to reflect that situation particularly at all, because in fact that crock of songs came out of a general feeling of anxiety I've had in America for a number of years. It wasn't that localized – bang! – thing that happened in September.

— David Bowie, Entertainment Weekly, 2002

Due to its subject matter, recording location and timing of its release, commentators at the time suggested that Heathen was partly a response to the September 11 attacks. The author James E. Perone even stated in his book The Words and Music of David Bowie that the album "chronicles New York City at the time of the...attacks", identifying "Slip Away", "Slow Burn" and "A Better Future" as reflecting a post-9/11 atmosphere. Bowie denied any connections to the attacks, stating that all the songs were written beforehand and reflected a general feeling of anxiety that he had accumulated living in America, particularly "Slow Burn". Nevertheless, he admitted that "Sunday" "was quite spine-tingling to realise how close those lyrics came. There are some key words in there that really just freak me out." Visconti later explained that the recording sessions were still underway at the time of the attacks, but suggested that "only a few lines were amended after September 11". Plati also commented that "I think in Heathen you can feel the overall mood of where we all were during those times."

=== Songs ===
The album opener, "Sunday", displays pervading electronic textures and synthesiser-based loops, musically descending from the atmospherics of Low and tracks such as "Word on a Wing" (1976), "The Motel" (1995) and "The Dreamers" (1999). Establishing the album's core themes of spiritual doubt and existential dread, the dreary lyrics were inspired by the surrounding region around Allaire. Pegg argues the title "neatly encapsulates the album's sense of an uneasy balance between the spiritual and the secular". "Cactus" discusses a distaste and lack of sexual engagement that represents a departure from the album's main themes. Featuring Visconti on bass and Bowie on all other instruments, including his only recorded drum performance, Pegg considers the rendition a raw, tightly produced piece of garage rock that pays homage to T. Rex's "The Groover" (1973).

"Slip Away" is a ballad reminiscent of "Space Oddity" (1969) and "Life on Mars?" (1971). Rewritten and remade from the Toy track "Uncle Floyd", the lyrics meditate on lost happiness and yearning expressed through the views of two puppets from the obscure low-budget children's television series The Uncle Floyd Show. Bowie said in 2002 that he placed "Slip Away" on Heathen because he "wanted something on the album that pointed to a nicer time ... even if it wasn't necessarily true". "Slow Burn" musically harkens back to Bowie's 1970s works, particularly with saxophone playing; Pegg finds it a modernised update of the R&B styles of "'Heroes'" and "Teenage Wildlife" (1980). The lyrics expressed Bowie's accumulated feelings of anxiety but suggested a 9/11 influence with lyrics such as "Here are we, at the centre of it all".

"Afraid" is set to the original backing track recorded for Toy, but with new production from Visconti. Musically upbeat and inspired by 1970s new wave, its character is insecure and fearful for the future, similar to the 1997 re-recording of "I Can't Read". Bowie's cover of "I've Been Waiting for You" is a relatively straightforward rendition that Pegg believes stands as the "least essential" of the album's three covers. According to the biographer Chris O'Leary, Bowie used the Pixies' 1990 cover as a template for his version. "I Would Be Your Slave" is more avant-garde and minimalist compared to other album tracks, based around sequences of strings and drum loops. The lyrics feature ambiguous dialogue between a disturbed protagonist and another figure, analysed by biographers as either a lover or God. Perone calls it a "song of undying devotion".

According to O'Leary, Bowie covered "I Took a Trip on a Gemini Spaceship" as a way to "make amends" for not compensating Odam when he used him as an influence for Ziggy. Concerning a character who is lonely out in space, the music is incohesive, featuring an abrasive "speed-funk backdrop" of instruments that reference science fiction programs from Space: 1999 to Star Trek. "5.15 The Angels Have Gone" is a somber number that concerns a hopeless man who feels isolated and packs up to leave town, continuing a theme present throughout Bowie's entire career, from "Can't Help Thinking About Me" (1965) to "Move On" (1979). Perone likens its angel references to Hours and the use of trains representing a change in lifestyle to "Station to Station" (1976). Musically, it sets an icy percussion backing with a repetitive guitar phrase.

"Everyone Says 'Hi'" features a lush and sentimental arrangement to present a meditation on bereavement and denial. Like the previous track, the song's character desires to leave home for better opportunities. Perone opines that the track upholds "the general sense of disillusionment and disconnection" that pervades the album. "A Better Future" is Bowie's plea to God for a brighter world where his daughter can grow up safe. Perone says that the lyrics "ring true" to the context of both a personal relationship and the feeling of bereavement in New York City after 9/11. Musically, the track displays textured production and a simple melody, with electronic minimalism akin to the Berlin Trilogy and the "catchy synthesiser pop" of "Dead Against It" (1993), foreshadowing the songs on the artist's next studio album Reality (2003). Musically, "Heathen (The Rays)" offers a culmination of the album's styles, evoking "Sunday" and "Slip Away" with a gradually growing arrangement, and boasting the multi-layered backing vocals found throughout the entire album. Bowie explained: "'Heathen' is about knowing you're dying. [...] It's a song to life, where I'm talking to life as a friend or lover." Buckley opines that its "Warszawa"-type ending leaves the listener "seemingly without hope or consolation".

== Artwork and packaging ==
I think one of the subtexts for the word 'heathen' is one that is barbaric or Philistine. [...] the idea of the iconoclastic pieces in it, like the ripping of paintings and destruction of religious things.

— David Bowie on the title, 2002

The album's themes are reflected in the artwork and packaging. The artwork was photographed by Markus Klinko, who took the cover photo for I Am Iman, the autobiography of Bowie's wife Iman. The photo sessions took place in early 2002 and were digitally enhanced by Klinko's partner Indrani. Bowie then hired the book's designer Jonathan Barnbrook to create the cover's upside-down typeface, which evokes the writings of Jacques Derrida, one of Bowie's favourite philosophers. Klinko's photographs included in the booklet reinforce the sense of divine rejection: Bowie sitting at a Spartan school-desk with his pen in the air above a blank page. Various shots depict him cutting through the pages, while his crucifix is censored in another photo. On the cover artwork itself, Bowie appears in semi-profile, Buckley finding that he "looks possessed" and gazing "like a grown-up Midwich Cuckoo". His eyes are blank and silvered out, which Pegg suggests represents "a state of both blindness and transcendence". Bowie explained that they were fish eyes (a reference to the ichthys) and the artwork as a whole was intended "as a pun on Christianity". In another interview, he stated they come from Luis Buñuel and Salvador Dalí's 1929 film Un Chien Andalou.

An image included in the packaging contains three books that announce the themes: Albert Einstein's The General Theory of Relativity (1915), Sigmund Freud's The Interpretation of Dreams (1899), (Note: Bowie referenced Freud's approach to dreams throughout his entire career, from his 1967 debut album's "Did You Ever Have a Dream" and "When I Live My Dream" to "The Dreamers" and "If I'm Dreaming My Life" from Hours.) and Friedrich Nietzsche's The Gay Science (1882). Non-literary references include various medieval and Renaissance paintings that are marred by paint splatters and knife slashes, including: Guido Reni's Massacre of the Innocents (1611), symbolising Bowie's fear for his daughter's future – and inevitably the 9/11 attacks; Duccio di Buoninsegna's Madonna and Child with Six Angels (1300–1305), suggesting that "the angels have gone"; Carlo Dolci's Magdalene (1660–1670), appearing in an inverted detail; and an engraved undated copy of Peter Paul Rubens' Christ and St. John with Angels. The standard jewel-case CD booklet also included a torn image of Raffaello Sanzio's St. Sebastian (1501–1502). Pegg and Buckley call the artwork one of Bowie's finest.

== Release and promotion ==
In December 2001, Bowie departed Virgin and began forming his own independent label, ISO Records. He explained: "I've had one too many years of bumping heads with corporate structure. Many times, I've not [agreed] with how things are done and as a writer of some proliferation, frustrated at how slow and lumbering it all is. I've dreamed of embarking on my own set-up for such a long time and now is the perfect opportunity." In March 2002, the newly-formed label entered a licensing deal with Columbia Records, who would distribute Bowie's work starting with Heathen. Columbia's chairman Don Ienner offered his full support of Bowie in a released statement, praising Heathen as "a remarkable addition to [an] incredible body of work [...] I think it's the album his worldwide audience has been waiting for." The deal lasted the rest of his life.

"Slow Burn" was released in Japan and Europe only on 3 June 2002 as the album's lead single in different CD formats, packaged with various outtakes; a planned UK release for July was cancelled. A 60-second clip of Bowie and child actress Hayley Nicholas directed by Gary Koepke appeared as a television commercial to promote Heathen, but its full Koepke-directed music video remained unreleased until 2016. "Everyone Says 'Hi'" was issued as the second single on 16 September, backed by "Safe" and various Heathen and Toy tracks. It reached number 20 in the UK and was supported by a rare video taken from a live performance in July. "I've Been Waiting for You" appeared as a single the same month in Canada only.

Heathen was released in Europe on 10 June 2002 and in America the following day. It came in various CD formats, including a standard CD with the full 12-track album and a limited-edition digipack bundled with the Toy remake of "Conversation Piece" and the 1979 version of "Panic in Detroit", along with an online code to access lyrics, scrapped album artworks and two audio tracks; the Japanese release added the B-side "Wood Jackson". In December, Heathen appeared on SACD, featuring a 5.1 surround sound remix of the album, extended versions of four tracks and outtakes.

The album's marketing campaign included television appearances, interviews, pre-release "listening events" and in America, a television commercial featuring Bowie and a young girl, described by the former as a "parent-child situation". The campaign and press coverage of the Bowie-hosted Meltdown festival and the 30th anniversary of Ziggy Stardust (1972) led Heathen to become his most anticipated album in several years. Reaching number five on the UK Albums Chart, it matched the performance of Hours and remained on the chart for 20 consecutive weeks, the artist's longest continuous chart presence since Let's Dance (1983). It also reached number 14 on the US Billboard 200, becoming Bowie's highest-charting album since Tonight (1984). Across Europe, Heathen reached number one in Denmark, two in Norway, three in France, four in Austria, Belgium Flanders and Germany, and the top ten in Australia, Belgium Wallonia, Canada, Ireland, Italy, Scotland, Sweden and Switzerland. (Note: Attributed to multiple references:) Elsewhere, the album charted in Finland (11), Hungary (18), the Netherlands (19), New Zealand (22), Japan (26), and Spain (27). (Note: Attributed to multiple references:)

== Critical reception ==
Professional ratings
Aggregate scores
Source	Rating
Metacritic	68/100
Review scores
Source	Rating
AllMusic	3.5/5 stars
Blender	3/5 stars
Entertainment Weekly	B+
The Guardian	4/5 stars
NME	8/10
Pitchfork	7.8/10
Q	4/5 stars
Rolling Stone	3.5/5 stars
Spin	3/5 stars
The Village Voice	C+

Heathen was Bowie's best-received album in years. Reviewers declared it a return to form and his best work since Scary Monsters. (Note: Attributed to multiple references:) Bowie himself remarked that "It seems to be traditional now that every album since Black Tie White Noise [1993] is the best album I've put out since Scary Monsters. Inevitably, that's what I get. But this one just seems to have caught people's imaginations." On Metacritic, the album has an average score of 68 out of 100 based on 20 reviews, indicating "generally favourable reviews".

In The Guardian, Alexis Petridis found a "strident, confident" album "lush with melodies" that "achieves a balance noticeably lacking in Bowie's output of the past 20 years". Although he felt it did not reach the highs of Station to Station, Low or Scary Monsters, he concluded that Heathen is "packed with fantastic songs" and is overall "the sound of a man who has finally worked out how to grow old with a fitting degree of style". Chris Jones of BBC Music found it not a return to form, but rather "a continuation of all the marvelous things we love about [Bowie]." He ultimately called it a "serendipitous release" that "bursts with a positively rude health". AllMusic's Stephen Thomas Erlewine reasoned that despite a lack of innovation, the ending result is "an understated, utterly satisfying record, [...] simply because he'd never sounded as assured and consistent since." Sarah Dempster of NME opined that with the album, Bowie "remains rock's most worship-worthy oddity".

Numerous reviewers highlighted the return of Visconti as harkening back to his and Bowie's late-1970s collaborations. The author Paul Trynka argued the producer helped ditch the "intense sonic textures, overlayered production, and the sense that Bowie was trying too hard" that pervaded its predecessors. Rolling Stone's David Fricke stated that the majority of Heathen was "the sound of Bowie essentially covering himself — to splendid, often moving effect." Pitchfork's Eric Carr similarly wrote that "Bowie is obviously never going to recapture his trend-setting finesse of yesteryear, but at least he seems okay with that. And that's this record's greatest strength." A writer for Time Out magazine described the album as "a collection of strong, melodic songs executed with playful primitivism and sung with a force and passion that would be remarkable in a man half his age." The cover songs were also praised.

Some reviewers expressed more mixed assessments. Time magazine's Benjamin Nugent found that the only good songs were the covers, while Kyle Smith of People complained about a general lack of melodicism. The veteran critic Robert Christgau was also mixed in The Village Voice, naming Heathen his "dud of the month", primarily citing weak songwriting. Although he highlighted tracks such as "Cactus", "Slow Burn" and "Afraid", Blender's John Aizlewood criticised the track listing as incohesive, finding they "plod" rather than "spring". In a negative review for Uncut magazine, Ian MacDonald complained that none of the album's 12 tracks have memorable choruses or melodies, with "short-breathed and tired" phrasings and "energyless" sequences. He also cited poor track flows resulting in a disappointing and dissatisfying Bowie album.

Heathen was nominated for the Mercury Prize. "Slow Burn" also received a Grammy nomination for Best Male Rock Vocal Performance at the 45th Annual Grammy Awards in 2003.

== Live performances ==
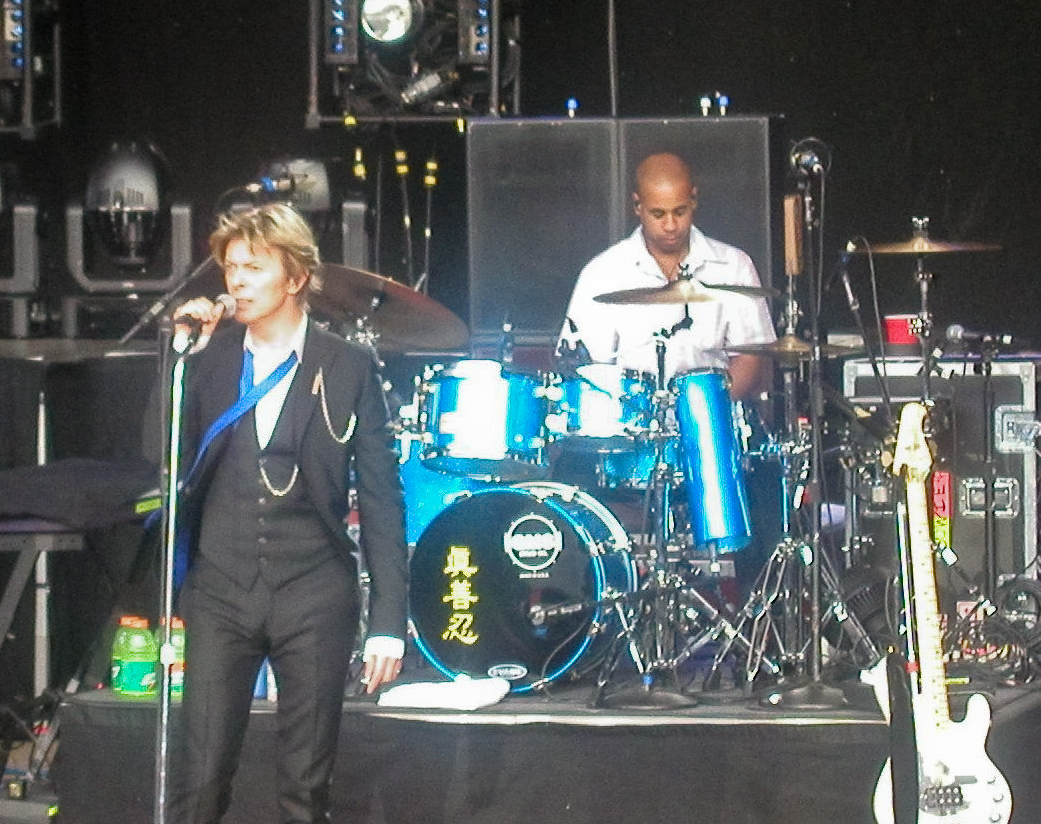
Bowie on stage with Sterling Campbell during the Heathen Tour, 2002

Bowie supported the album on the Heathen Tour from 10 May to 23 October 2002. After the smaller-scale Hours Tour, Bowie opted for a "less is more" approach for the Heathen Tour, stating that "touring has become harder and harder for me." The lineup featured returning musicians Earl Slick, Gail Ann Dorsey, Plati, Garson, Campbell, Leonard and Catherine Russell. First making a series of festival and television appearances, Bowie and the band played Low and Heathen in their entireties during performances in June. He stated: "The two albums kind of feel like cousins to each other. They've got a sonic similarity."

Changes were made to the setlist after headlining the UK Meltdown festival. "A Better Future", "Slow Burn" and "I Took a Trip on a Gemini Spaceship" were dropped in favour of more crowd-pleasing numbers, such as "Stay" (1976) and "Life on Mars?"; most of Low and Heathen continued to be played for subsequent shows. In late July 2002, Bowie joined the musician Moby on his 12-date Area: 2 festival tour promoting his new album 18. (Note: The two had formed a friendship in 1997 after Moby remixed Earthling's "Dead Man Walking".) Bowie's performances at Area: 2 were described by numerous reviewers as show-stealers. In September, he made various television appearances to promote the "Everyone Says 'Hi'" single.

The tour's European leg commenced on 22 September 2002 with a show in Berlin and ended on 2 October with a show at London's Hammersmith Odeon, the venue where Bowie famously killed off Ziggy Stardust in 1973. Afterwards, the tour was extended to multiple shows in New York, where tracks from Heathen and oldies such as "Rebel Rebel" (1974) were played. In the end, the tour consisted of 36 dates, with several leisurely breaks. Bowie initially ruled out the possibility of a world tour due to his family commitments. However, the success of the Heathen Tour and admiration for his touring band reinvigorated his desire for larger tours, leading to the worldwide A Reality Tour the following year.

== Legacy ==
I know how good this album is. It's an incredibly successful album for me creatively. I wouldn't change a note of it. [...] And it's given me an unbelievably buoyant kind of confidence as a writer. And I almost feel that I will be writing some of my very best work over the next few years.

— David Bowie on Heathen, 2002

Heathen marked a commercial and creative resurgence for Bowie. Buckley argues that he finally found a voice in 2002 compared to the 1990s, when critics dismissed him as "genre-hopping". With Heathen's update of old themes into a modern settings, the public took notice of him for the first time "in a generation". The album went on to sell one million copies worldwide by the end of 2003. In later years, some commentators found the album one of the artist's strongest albums of his later career. In 2016, Bryan Wawzenek of Ultimate Classic Rock placed Heathen at number 17 out of 26 in a list ranking Bowie's studio albums from worst to best, calling it "distinguished, thoughtful and spirited". Including Bowie's two albums with Tin Machine, Consequence of Sound ranked Heathen number 19 in a 2018 list, with Blake Goble finding it an "atmospheric residue from Bowie's '70s efforts made in a more commercially slick and stable world".

Bowie's biographers have reacted positively to Heathen. Some found it an improvement over its immediate predecessors: Buckley finds it lacks the "optimism" of Earthling, while Pegg calls the songwriting an improvement over Hours. Pegg further hails Visconti's production as "the richest, strongest sound of any Bowie album in years", particularly signaling out his work on "Afraid" and "I Would Be Your Slave". Pegg positively compares Bowie's vocal performances to that of "Heroes" and Scary Monsters, while Trynka considers them his finest since Baal (1982).

On the album as a whole, Buckley felt that it failed to replicate the creativity of his 1970s works, but by itself, it stands as "a valid and at times excellent piece of work". Pegg felt the inclusion of three covers was excessive and noted the overall lack of melodies, but "combined with superb performances, not to mention some of the finest and most probing lyrics Bowie ever wrote, the result is a positive triumph." He added that after a decade of experimentation, Heathen emerged from that decade's collaborators with "an impressive collection of songs which evoke the classic Bowie of old, but are at the same time convincingly modern in style, intent and execution."

=== Remaster ===
A newly remastered version of the album was released on 12 September 2025 as part of the I Can't Give Everything Away (2002–2016) box set. The set also includes a previously unreleased live album from the Heathen Tour, recorded at the Montreux Jazz Festival on 18 July 2002, as well as some of the album's outtakes and other tracks from the period.

== Track listing ==
All tracks are written by David Bowie, and produced by Bowie and Tony Visconti, except where noted

Heathen – Standard edition
No.	Title	Writer(s)	Producer(s)	Length
1.	"Sunday"			4:45
2.	"Cactus"	Black Francis		2:54
3.	"Slip Away"			6:05
4.	"Slow Burn"			4:41
5.	"Afraid"		Bowie; Mark Plati	3:28
6.	"I've Been Waiting for You"	Neil Young		3:00
7.	"I Would Be Your Slave"			5:14
8.	"I Took a Trip on a Gemini Spaceship"	Norman Carl Odam		4:04
9.	"5:15 The Angels Have Gone"			5:00
10.	"Everyone Says 'Hi'"		Brian Rawling; Gary Miller	3:59
11.	"A Better Future"			4:11
12.	"Heathen (The Rays)"			4:16
Total length:				52:08

Heathen = ヒーザン – Japanese edition
No.	Title	Length
13.	"Wood Jackson"	4:48
Total length:		56:56

Heathen – 2-CD deluxe edition (Bonus disc)
No.	Title	Length
1.	"Sunday" (Moby remix)	5:12
2.	"A Better Future" (Remix by Air)	4:59
3.	"Conversation Piece" (Written 1969 – Recorded 1970 – Re-recorded 2002)	3:53
4.	"Panic in Detroit" (Outtake from a 1979 recording)	2:59
Total length:		17:03

Heathen – 2007 Japanese 2-CD deluxe edition (Disc 2)
No.	Title	Length
5.	"Wood Jackson"	4:45
6.	"When the Boys Come Marching Home"	4:44
7.	"Baby Loves That Way"	4:43
8.	"You've Got a Habit of Leaving"	4:50
9.	"Safe"	4:42
10.	"Shadow Man"	4:46
Total length:		45:33

== Personnel ==
According to the liner notes and the biographer Nicholas Pegg:

- David Bowie – vocals, keyboards, guitars, saxophone, stylophone, drums
- Tony Visconti – bass, guitars, recorders, string arrangements, backing vocals
- Matt Chamberlain – drums, drum loop programming, percussion
- David Torn – guitars, guitar loops, Omnichord

Additional personnel

- The Scorchio Quartet:

- Greg Kitzis – first violin
- Meg Okura – second violin
- Martha Mooke – viola
- Mary Wooten – cello

- Carlos Alomar – guitar
- Sterling Campbell – drums, percussion
- Lisa Germano – violin
- Gerry Leonard – guitar
- Tony Levin – fretless bass
- Mark Plati – guitar, bass
- Jordan Rudess – keyboards
- The Borneo Horns:

- Lenny Pickett – baritone saxophone
- Stan Harrison – alto saxophone
- Steve Elson – tenor saxophone

- Kristeen Young – backing vocals, piano
- Pete Townshend – guitar ("Slow Burn")
- Dave Grohl – guitar ("I've Been Waiting for You")
- Gary Miller – additional guitar ("Everyone Says 'Hi'")
- John Read – bass ("Everyone Says 'Hi'")
- Solá Ákingbolá – percussion ("Everyone Says 'Hi'")
- Philip Sheppard – electric cello ("Everyone Says 'Hi'")

Production

- David Bowie – producer
- Tony Visconti – producer, engineer
- Mark Plati – co-producer ("Afraid")
- Brian Rawling – co-producer ("Everyone Says 'Hi'")
- Gary Miller – co-producer ("Everyone Says 'Hi'")

Design

- Jonathan Barnbrook – design
- Markus Klinko and Indrani Pal-Chaudhuri – photography
- GK Reid – styling

== Charts and certifications ==
=== Weekly charts ===
Weekly chart performance for "Heathen"
Chart (2002)	Peak position
Australian Albums (ARIA)	9
Austrian Albums (Ö3 Austria)	4
Belgian Albums (Ultratop Flanders)	4
Belgian Albums (Ultratop Wallonia)	6
Canadian Albums (Billboard)	9
Czech Albums (ČNS IFPI)	9
Danish Albums (Hitlisten)	1
Dutch Albums (Album Top 100)	19
Europe (European Top 100 Albums)	3
Finnish Albums (Suomen virallinen lista)	11
French Albums (SNEP)	3
German Albums (Offizielle Top 100)	4
Hungarian Albums (MAHASZ)	18
Iceland Albums (Tónlist)	4
Irish Albums (IRMA)	6
Italian Albums (FIMI)	6
Japanese Albums (Oricon)	26
New Zealand Albums (RMNZ)	22
Norwegian Albums (VG-lista)	2
Scottish Albums (Official Charts)	7
Spanish Albums (PROMUSICAE)	27
Swedish Albums (Sverigetopplistan)	6
Swiss Albums (Schweizer Hitparade)	7
UK Albums (Official Charts)	5
US Billboard 200	14

=== Year-end charts ===
Year-end chart performance for "Heathen"
Chart (2002)	Position
Belgian Albums (Ultratop Flanders)	79
Belgian Albums (Ultratop Wallonia)	55
Canadian Alternative Albums (Nielsen SoundScan)	81
French Albums (SNEP)	86
German Albums (Offizielle Top 100)	66
Italian Albums (Musica e Dischi)	100
Swiss Albums (Schweizer Hitparade)	86
UK Albums (OCC)	105

=== Certifications and sales ===
Certifications and sales for Heathen
Region	Certification	Certified units/sales
France (SNEP)	Gold	100,000^{*}
Spain (Promusicae)	Gold	50,000^{‡}
United Kingdom (BPI)	Gold	217,000
United States	—	180,000
Summaries
Worldwide	—	1,000,000
^{*} Sales figures based on certification alone.^{‡} Sales+streaming figures based on certification alone.
