= Idan Zareski =

French-Israeli sculptor

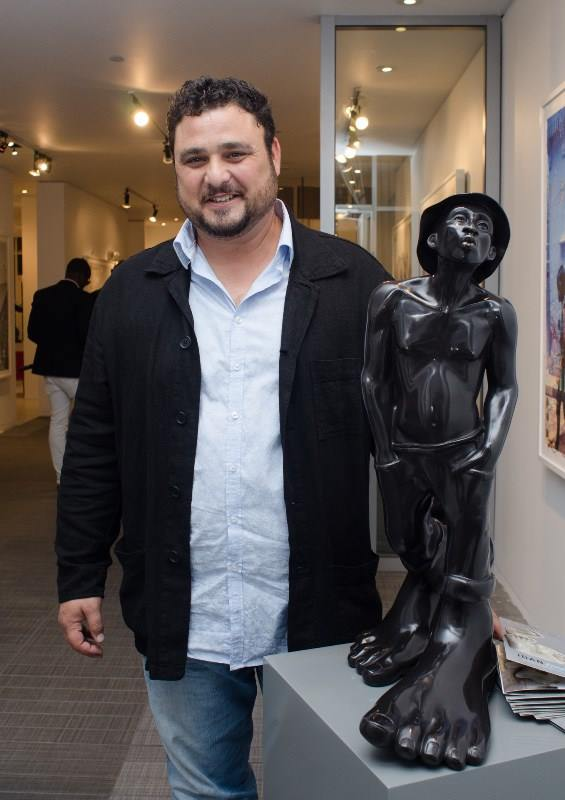
Idan Zareski with one of his works

Idan Zareski (Hebrew: עידן זרסקי) is a French-Israeli sculptor born in Haifa, Israel. Zareski has lived in various countries before making his home in Calmont, France.

== A self-taught sculptor ==
By combining his ideas with materials such as resin or bronze, Idan creates bodies in motion, either balanced or frozen in space. These sculpture projects are finalized in his workshops in France, Portugal, or Florida. Zareski never took any art or anatomy courses; instead, he follows his instincts and emotions rather than relying on drawings or sketches. Remarkably, ninety percent of his creations are shaped in less than one hour. The memories of his childhood, mostly spent in Africa, serve as his main source of inspiration. The artist recreates what he has witnessed while leaving room for improvisation, bringing us the Bigfoot Family Project.

== A peaceful call for hope ==
A Bigfoot Family is born: Babyfoot, Bigfoot, Coolfoot, Ladyfoot, La Bella, La Nena, Le Businessman, Le Rebel, Le Siffleur, Hubert et Bubu, and Toro.

Each one possesses a unique character while maintaining a common familial symbolism—big feet, which represent our roots and our connection to the Earth. According to Zareski, "no matter our race, color, where we live, or who we are, we are all tied to our paradisiac planet, our home”.

Idan aims to express the idea of unity among the human race through his work. The artist alters and transforms human anatomy in his sculptures by amplifying body parts, adopting relaxed postures, and using dramatic, vibrant colors ranging from metallic purple to bright green. These elements surprise the audience while conveying a tranquil, peaceful message. A closer look at the sculptures reveals a reflection and critique of our humanity, with each family member carrying an awareness message about cultural differences and origins.

== A globetrotter family ==
The Bigfoot family members are found in various locations around the world. Idan Zareski's artistic expression is evident in both monumental and smaller sculptures, with his work showcased in museums, galleries, art shows, luxury hotels, and parks. Cities like Miami, New York City, Monaco, Panama City, Paris, Cartagena and San José, Costa Rica are among the places where the Bigfoot Family has taken root.

== Galleries and exhibitions ==
=== Galleries ===
- Markowicz Fine Art in Miami, Florida and Dallas, Texas
- Bel air Fine Art – France
- Klaus Steinmetz Contemporary – San Jose, Costa Rica
- LGM Galeria – Colombia
- PrestaArt Gallery – France
- ZK Gallery - San Francisco, USA, and Israel
- Tilsitt Gallery - Porto, Portugal.

=== Exhibitions ===
- Pop Family – In Arte Veritas – Narbonne, France - July / September 2024
- Art Dans la Ville – Montélimar, France - June 2024
- Brindos – Prestaart Gallery – Anglet, France - May / October 2024
- Art Miami – Markowicz Fine Art – Miami, USA - December 2023
- Art Basel Miami – December 2022
- Hillsborough Park Forest – North Ireland – April 2022 / Ongoing
- Royal Monceau – Paris – February 2021 – December 2022
- Summer Sculpture Exhibition - Porto Montenegro – Montenegro – June – September 2021
- Art Up ! Lilles – France - June 2021
- CRS Taiwan – China – April 2021 – April 2022
- Le Village Royal - Paris – Décembre 2020
- International Art Show - Marina de Cascais - Nov-Dec 2020
- Monumental Sculpture Exhibit at Knokke with Bel-Air - Jun-Sep 2020
- Miami Art Week 2019 Context-Art Miami
- Giardini della Marinaressa, Biennale di Venezia, Italy - May-Novembre 2019
- Bel-Air Fine Art Crans-Montana, Switzerland - March 2019
- Art Up! - Lille, France - March 2019
- Bel-Air Fine Art Geneva Solo Show, Switzerland - January 2019
- St. Tropez - France - July 2018
- Le Touquet Paris Plage - France Summer 2018
- Art Miami 2017 - Miami, Florida - December 2017
- BARCU 2017 (Bogotá Arte y Cultura) - Bogota, Colombia - October 2017
- Art Baku - Bogota, Colombia - October 2017
- Antwerp Art Fair - August 2017
- FAM – Marché Bonsecours – Montreal, Canada – June 2017
- art3f – Toulouse, France – February 2017
- art3f – Paris, France – January 2017
- LuxExpo – Luxembourg – December 2016
- art3f – Nice, France – October 2016
- Art Tentation – Monaco, France – September 2016
- Art Tentation – Isle sur la Sorgue, France – August 2016
- Solo Show Panama, Steinmetz Contemporary – October 2015
- Best of France – New York, USA – September 2015
- Mouche Gallery – Beverly Hills, USA – April 2015
- Valoarte – San Jose, Costa Rica – September 2014
- Village de marques – Nailloux, France – June 2014
- Miami Design District "Art Garden" – Miami, USA – January 2014
- Art Southampton – New York, USA – July 2014
- Escazu – San Jose, Costa Rica – February 2013
- Context Art Miami – Miami, USA – December 2013
- NAO Cartagena – Cartagena, Colombia – October 2013
- Stade Pierre Mauroy – Lille, France – May 2013
- Cologny, Switzerland – January 2013
- Botanical Garden – Miami Beach, USA – March 2012
- Context Art Miami – Miami, USA – December 2012
- Carla-Bayle, France – August 2012
- Puccini Festival – Torre del Lago, Italy – August 2012
- Scope Basel – Basel, Switzerland – June 2012
- Top Marques Monaco – Monaco – May 2012
- Art Monaco – Monaco – April 2012
- Scope Miami – Miami, USA – December 2011
- ARTBO – Bogotá, Colombia – October 2011
- Jacob Karpio Who Galeria – Costa Rica – October 2011
- Valoarte – San Jose, Costa Rica – September 2011
- Metalogik – Hotel Villa Caletas/Zephyr Palace, Costa Rica – July 2011 Curated and presented by Jacob Karpio
- Via Lindora – Santa Ana, Costa Rica – March 2011
- Mazeres, France – September 2008
