= Alain Godon =

French painter and sculptor (born 1964)

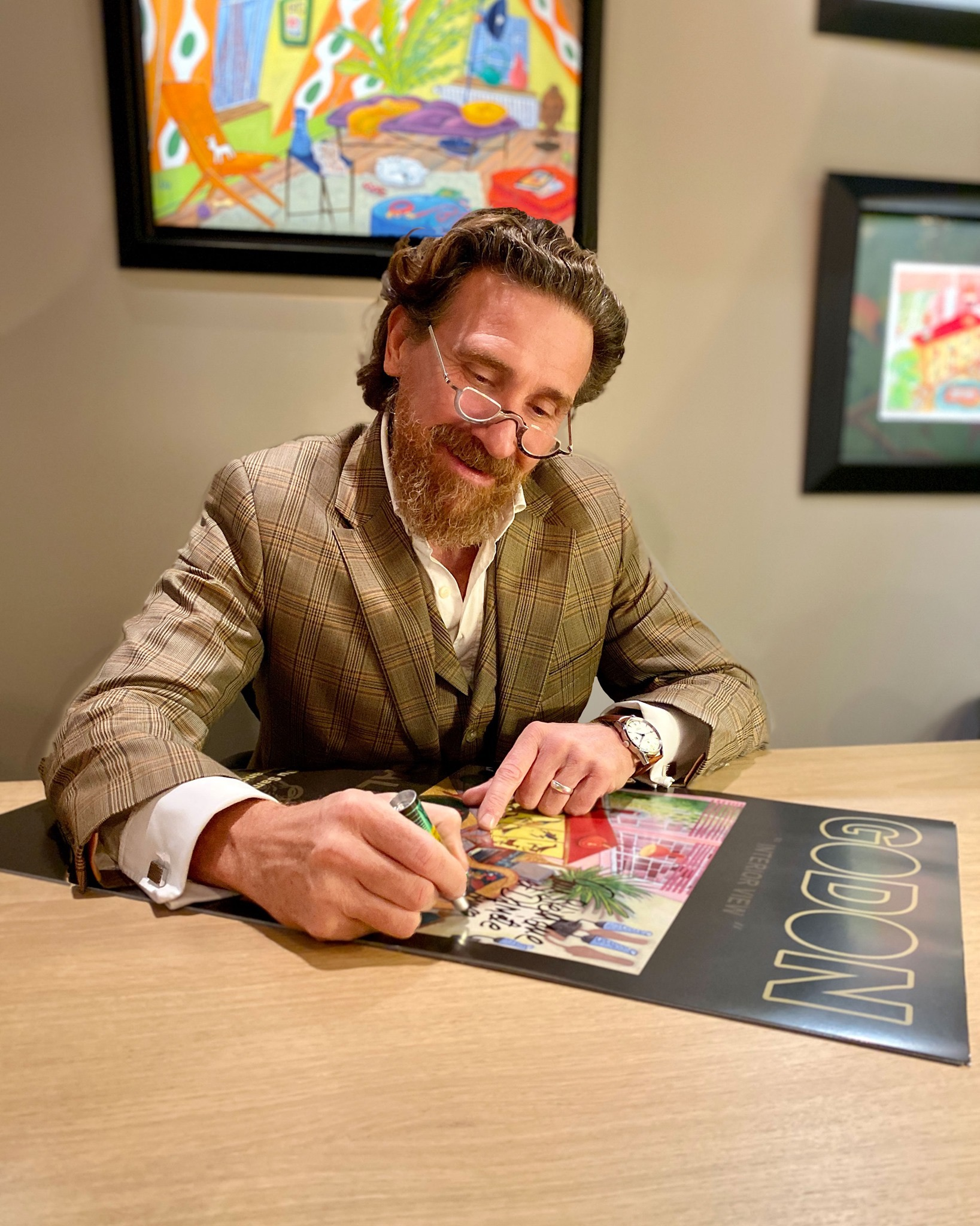
- A portrait of Alain Godon
- Born: Alain Godon; 1 November 1964 (age 61); Bourges, Cher, France
- Known for: Painter, sculptor

Alain Godon is a French painter and sculptor.

== Biography ==
Alain Godon was born on 1 November 1964 in Bourges, France, and learned to draw at the age of 11 in Achicourt, France, at the side of his artist uncle. In 1985 he moved to Paris and then to Brighton (England), earning his living as a pavement graffiti artist. In 1988 in the French ski resort of Courchevel, he began the first period of what he refers to as "Infantine Art". By 1989 he had moved to Saint Tropez and started to paint his first oils on canvas. Alain currently lives in London.

Of Godon's art, Jean-Pierre Delarge declares that it is "aligned with free figuration drawing on the caricature figures of his graffiti origins. His representations are simplistic, his colors vivid, his outlines defined by thin black strokes; his figuration achieves contour and definition in the composition of curved and straight lines.

In 2009, Alain Godon founded the "Rendez-vous Annuel des Artistes de Demain" (The Annual Festival for Artists of Tomorrow). The event aims to exhibit up-and-coming artist both to the public and professionals helping these artists to attain a public profile and to access the commercial art world. Nearly 600 participants, representing all schools of contemporary art, will be attending the second festival taking place in Le Touquet in 2010. Through this initiative, Godon hopes to support unknown artists and offer them the opportunity to escape obscurity and achieve recognition.

== BildoReliefo ==
BildoReliefo is Esperanto for a three-dimensional image.

The technique is the creation of Alain Godon introduced to the public in 2008. These pictures are digital ultra high-definition single print editions. The artist transforms his original oil painting into a unique digital work of art.
Considered a creative art, it is a process which combines the traditional art of oil on canvas with digital technology.

By "de-constructing" each element of the original oil painting and then "re-constructing" the picture by adding a shadow effect, the artist creates a three-dimensional impression. Each work of art is unique and original since it is created with its own color nuance. The BildoReliefo is printed by PICTO in Paris. Each of Alain Godon's original oil painting printed as a BildoReliefo series is limited to an edition of ten – each version with its own distinctive color finish.

The BildoReliefo was presented to the public in 2009 at the "Pavillon des Arts et du Design" in Paris by Hubert Konrad, co-founder of ARTPRICE.

== Selected exhibitions ==
=== 1990s ===
1994: First personal exhibition at Le Palais de I`Europe in Le Touquet.

1996: Personal exhibition at the Dorval Gallery (Poliakoff, Herbin, Paul Jenkins...) in Le Touquet.

1997: Personal exhibition at the Lustman Gallery, rue Quincampoix, Paris.

1998:

- Personal exhibition at the Dorval Gallery in Lille, France.
- Exhibition at La Tour des Cardinaux Gallery in Iles sur Sargues, France.
- Purchase by the collector Guessas of a series of paintings for an exhibition in the United States.

1999:

- Private exhibition with Artcote in Paris, France.
- Exhibitions at the Krix Gallery, Amsterdam, the Guessas Gallery, Denver USA and a personal exhibition at La Tour des Cardinaux Gallery.
- Exhibitions of thirty paintings by the museum of Le Touquet for permanent and travelling exhibitions.

=== 2000s ===
2000:

- Personal retrospective exhibition at the Museum of Le Touquet
- Personal exhibition at the Fardel Gallery, Le Touquet.

2001:

- Personal exhibition in the Great Hall of Lille City Hall.
- Exhibition in the National Assembly of France at the invitation of the Deputy Mayor Léonce Deprez.
- First partnership with Pascal Lansberg of the Lansberg Gallery, rue de Seine, Paris (Matisse, Magritte, Fernand Léger...).
- His painting "Jules Vernes" was accepted into the public collection of the Museums of France.

2002:

- Personal exhibition at the Fardel Gallery, Le Touquet.
- Private exhibition with Artcote, Paris.
- Private exhibition in Megève, France.

2003:

- Exhibition at Seine 51 Gallery, Paris.

2004:

- Personal exhibition at the Fardel Gallery, Le Touquet.
- Retrospective of one hundred paintings in the town hall of Le Touquet at the invitation of the Deputy Mayor Léonce Deprez.
- Personal exhibition at the Dorval Gallery, Lille.

2005:

- Personal exhibition at the Seine 51 Gallery, Paris.
- Travelled to Rhodes and studied the Greek community and its culture.
- At the request of Pascal Lansberg travelled to Bali, Indonesia and worked for two months on a series of oil paintings
- Exhibition at the Darga Gallery, Bali (Basquiat, Tom Wesselmann, Chu Teh-Chun...)
- First sale at auction of an Alain Godon painting, at the Cornette de Saint-Cyr (Paris) auction house.
- "The Last Pharaon", oil on canvas, was acquired for its public collection by the Museums of France.

2006:

- Personal exhibition at the Dorval Gallery in Lille, France.
- Publication of Manhattan Jungle, an edition which presented his current works.

2007:

- Personal exhibition at the Fardel Gallery, Le Touquet.
- Publication of the book Paris-Plage et Godon by Patrice Deparpe, former Director of the Museum of Le Touquet, and Georges-Félix Cohen, photographer.
- Inauguration of the "Godon Suite" in the Bristol Hotel – Le Touquet, France

2008:

- Personal exhibition "BildoReliefo" at the Elysée Gallery – New York.
- Personal exhibition at the Galerie Adler (Artcote – Hubert Konrad), Paris.
- The book "Paris? mon oeil !" written by Christian Boeringer (former commercial director of the Louvre Museum) is published by Editions Artcote.

2009:

- Personal exhibition at the Pavillon des Arts et du Design, Les Tuileries, Paris, with Hubert Konrad Gallery.
- Creation of The Festival of Le Touquet (an annual festival for young artists) presided over by Emmanuel de Chaunac, Senior Vice President, Christie's
- Personal exhibition at the Dorval Gallery, Lille.

2010:

- Alain Godon is commissioned to design the poster for Enduropale.
- Personal exhibition of BildoReliefos in Miami, at Markowicz Fine Art gallery.
- The second Festival of Le Touquet takes place, presided over by Emmanuel Breon, Director of the Musée National de l'Orangerie.
- Personal exhibition at the Fardel Gallery, Le Touquet
- First sale at auction of an Alain Godon sculpture at the Massol auction house at Drouot, Paris.

2011:

- One man exhibition of paintings and sculptures at Markowicz Fine Art Gallery in Miami, USA. Special opening at the New World Center, Miami Beach (Franck Ghery building)
- Installation of the third Festival of contemporary art in Le Touquet, France.
- Exhibition of paintings and sculptures at the Hubert Konrad Gallery 32 avenue Matignon in Paris, France

2012:

- Head in the Clouds, Drasner Gallery, East Hyman Avenue, Aspen, CO
- Travel, Hubert Konrad Gallery, avenue Matignon, Paris, France
- Extravaganza, Musée du Touquet Paris-Plage, France
- Solo Exhibition at Fardel Gallery – Le Touquet, France
- Solo Exhibition at Wilson Gallery – Dijon, France
- Group Exhibition at Markowicz Fine Art Gallery – Miami, USA

2013:

- Solo Exhibition at Milani Gallery – Le Touquet, France
- Solo Exhibition at Hubert Konrad Gallery – Paris, France
- Exhibition at Florida Grand Opera with Markowicz Fine Art Gallery – Miami, USA

2014:

- Solo Exhibition, Denis Bloch Gallery, Los Angeles
- LA Art Fair, Los Angeles
- Solo Exhibition at Milani Gallery – Le Touquet, France
- Solo Exhibition at Hubert Konrad Gallery – Paris, France

Alain Godon Commissioned To Create The Art for The 2015 Miami Beach City Report

2015 :

- Solo Exhibition "World Tour in Eighty Artwork", Markowicz Fine Art Gallery, Miami
- Solo Exhibition at Milani Gallery – Le Touquet, France
- Solo Exhibition at Denis Bloch Gallery – Beverly Hills, CA, USA
- Exhibition Art Up – Lille Grand Palais, France

2016 :

- Solo Exhibition at Markowicz Fine Art – Miami, USA
- Exhibition Art Up – Lille Grand Palais, France

2018

- Solo exhibition at the Matisse Museum (Le Cateau-Cambraisis) le New-York Tahiti Godon et Matisse dans le meme bateau.
