= Baby Loves That Way =

1965 song by David Bowie

Single by Davy Jones
- A-side: "You've Got a Habit of Leaving"
- Released: 20 August 1965
- Recorded: July 1965
- Studio: IBC, London
- Genre: Beat
- Length: 3:03
- Label: Parlophone
- Songwriter: Davy Jones a.k.a. David Bowie
- Producer: Shel Talmy

"Baby Loves That Way" is a song written by David Bowie in 1965 and released as the B-side of single "You've Got a Habit of Leaving" under the name Davy Jones with his band at the time, the Lower Third, who were uncredited. Bowie remade the song during the sessions for his Toy album in 2000, which was officially released in 2021.

== Overview ==
"Baby Loves That Way" was recorded in early July 1965 at IBC Studios in London. David Bowie, who was still performing under the name Davie Jones, recorded it with his band at the time, the Lower Third. The song was produced by Shel Talmy and engineered by Glyn Johns, who both contributed backing vocals. The song's musical style was influenced by the Kinks and Herman's Hermits. Chris O'Leary describes it as "a three-chord hook-filled beat song". The lyrics focus on a man's unloyal significant other, hints at what Nicholas Pegg calls "the sleazy sexuality" of Bowie's later work.

"Baby Loves That Way" was released as the B-side of "You've Got a Habit of Leaving" on 20 August 1965 under the Parlophone label, with the catalogue number R 5315. The single was solely credited to "Davy Jones" (rather than "Davie"); the Lower Third was credited for their next and final single, "Can't Help Thinking About Me". The original recording appeared on the Early On (1964–1966) compilation in 1991, while a remastered version and a recording with an alternate vocal was featured on The Shel Talmy Recordings in 2026.

== Toy version ==
"Baby Loves That Way"

Song by David Bowie

from the album Toy
- Released: 26 November 2021
- Recorded: July–October 2000
- Studio: Sear Sound and Looking Glass (New York City)
- Length: 4:37
- Label: ISO/Parlophone
- Songwriter: David Bowie
- Producer: David Bowie

Bowie re-recorded "Baby Loves That Way" during the sessions for the Toy project between July and October 2000, along with other tracks he wrote and recorded during the mid-1960s, including "You've Got a Habit of Leaving". The remake contains a slower tempo with a more subdued vocal. The lineup consisted of members of Bowie's then-touring band: guitarist Earl Slick, bassist Gail Ann Dorsey, pianist Mike Garson, musician Mark Plati and drummer Sterling Campbell, along with instrumentalist Lisa Germano on violin and backing vocalists Holly Palmer and Emm Gryner. Co-produced by Bowie and Plati, the band rehearsed the songs at Sear Sound Studios in New York City before recording them as live tracks. Plati stated that he refused to listen to Bowie's original recordings of the tracks, so to prevent the originals from influencing his playing on the new versions. Overdubs were recorded at New York's Looking Glass Studios.

Toy was initially intended for release in March 2001, before it was shelved by EMI/Virgin due to financial issues. So, Bowie departed the label and recorded his next album Heathen (2002). The remake of "Baby Loves That Way" appeared on the Japanese release of the single "Slow Burn", the two-disc deluxe edition of Heathen and the UK and European release of the single "Everyone Says 'Hi'". In March 2011, tracks from the Toy sessions, including "Baby Loves That Way", were leaked online, attracting media attention. The leaked version lacked the opening drum roll and contained studio banter scattered throughout.

Ten years later, on 29 September 2021, Warner Music Group announced that Toy would get an official release on 26 November as part of the box set Brilliant Adventure (1992–2001) through ISO and Parlophone. A separate deluxe edition, titled Toy:Box, was released on 7 January 2022, which contains two new mixes of the song: an "alternate mix" and an "Unplugged and Somewhat Slightly Electric" mix, featuring new guitar parts by Plati and Slick. Reviewing Toy, Alexis Petridis of The Guardian called the remake "a nice enough song that nevertheless betrays its inspiration – Smokey Robinson's 'You Really Got a Hold On Me' – a little too obviously."

== Personnel ==
According to Chris O'Leary and Benoît Clerc:

Original version

- David Bowie – vocals, harmonica
- Dennis Taylor – lead guitar, backing vocals
- Graham Rivens – bass, backing vocals
- Phil Lancaster – drums, backing vocals
- Nicky Hopkins – piano
- Leslie Conn – backing vocals
- Shel Talmy – backing vocals, producer
- Glyn Johns – backing vocals, engineer

Toy version

- David Bowie – vocals, producer
- Earl Slick – lead and acoustic guitar
- Mark Plati – rhythm and acoustic guitar
- Gail Ann Dorsey – bass, backing vocals
- Mike Garson – piano
- Sterling Campbell – drums
- Lisa Germano – violin
- Holly Palmer – backing vocals
- Emm Gryner – backing vocals
