= The Shel Talmy Recordings =

Compilation album by David Bowie
- Released: 18 September 2026
- Recorded: January–August 1965
- Genres: Rock; mod pop
- Length: 57:09
- Labels: Parlophone; Warner
- Producer: Shel Talmy

David Bowie chronology
I Can't Give Everything Away (2002–2016) (2025)	The Shel Talmy Recordings (2026)

The Shel Talmy Recordings is a compilation album by the English musician David Bowie, released on 18 September 2026 through Parlophone/Warner. The album was released in two formats: a 22-track CD version and an edited single LP edition that contains 12 tracks. The vinyl LP was released in a limited edition of 1,965 copies with alternative artwork exclusive to the United Kingdom.

== Background ==
The collection draws upon some of Bowie's earliest recordings, made during his tenure in 1965 while under contract to American ex-pat producer Shel Talmy, at a time when the musician was known professionally as Davie Jones. Bowie was signed to Talmy’s Orbit-Universal Productions in January 1965 as a member of the Manish Boys, and after that group split in April 1965, subsequently brought in a new unit, the Lower Third. Bowie and the group would eventually part ways with Talmy in September 1965, moving on to Pye Records.

Talmy was later to say of his time working with Bowie:

I always thought he was incredibly talented, he was extremely bright, he impressed me as knowing exactly where he was going. He was 17 when I first recorded him, with the Manish Boys. I honestly didn't think that what he was writing at the time had a snowball's chance in hell of making it, but I thought, he's so original and brash, let's take a flier. So we did a bunch of them, and of course they didn't make it, and it wasn't until seven or eight years later that a window of opportunity opened for his style of music. And he made the most of it, of course. There wasn't a whole lot of difference between what I did with them and what he did seven or eight years later, just that at the time we put it out nobody wanted to know. It was weird music.

Talmy produced two singles at IBC Studios in London with David Bowie: "I Pity the Fool" / "Take My Tip" by the Manish Boys, released on Parlophone in March 1965; and "You've Got a Habit of Leaving" / "Baby Loves That Way", released on Parlophone in August 1965 and featuring Davie Jones & the Lower Third but with a label credit given only to "Davy Jones" (sic). Talmy employed session musicians Jimmy Page to play guitar on the Manish Boys session and Nicky Hopkins to play piano on the Lower Third session. All four commercially-issued sides are included on the compilation, along with alternative takes for each track featuring different vocal or instrumental parts.

The rest of The Shel Talmy Recordings consists of demos recorded during the same time period either as a solo or with the Lower Third. As Bowie had been signed to a publishing contract with Orbit Music as well as an artist, Talmy actively encouraged his songwriting and was the first to publish and record a Bowie original with the Manish Boys' "Take My Tip".

Five of these demos – "I'll Follow You", "Glad I’ve Got Nobody", "Bars of the County Jail", "I Want My Baby Back" and "That's Where My Heart Is" – were first issued on the 1991 compilation Early On (1964–1966). The remainder make their first appearance on this set. Five selections are the work of the first line-up of the Lower Third, including original drummer Les Mighall. Three further acoustic numbers feature Bowie with an unknown accompanist on guitar and harmony vocals. These tracks were all recorded at Central Sound, while the Lower Third's demo of "I Want Your Love", intended as a showcase for the Pretty Things, was recorded at Regent Sound.

The Shel Talmy Recordings was assembled by archivist and music historian Alec Palao, who uncovered the previously unreleased material while investigating the Shel Talmy catalog. In an extensive essay that accompanies the CD version, Palao states that:

In essence, David Bowie the artist is a book of chapters, the turn of each page delivering something completely different and unexpected from the last. And in perusal, a cardinal error would be to pit any of these episodes against the others, when in fact each fascinating phase in his career should be considered complementary. This collection, a primary chapter if not the very earliest instalment in David's musical journey, deserves legitimate consideration. It is invariably tempting to search for clues in an artist's tentative beginnings, and Bowie's juvenilia has been dissected more than most, but this has rarely been done within the proper context. The sounds here should not be judged by the standards of his later career, but by the standards of what was happening in Britain at that precise point in time. In which case, they speak as loudly of the excitement of London and its music scene in that pivotal year of 1965 as they do for the launch of its brightest future star.

== Critical reception ==
Professional ratings
Review scores
Source	Rating
The Guardian	3/5 stars
Shindig!	5/5 stars

In the UK press, The Shel Talmy Recordings received favorable reviews, including an 8/10 rating in Uncut, 9/10 in Classic Rock and five stars in Shindig!. In a review in The Guardian, the release was given three stars by Alexis Petridis, who wrote, "As a document of British rock in transition – the sound of middling bands nevertheless alive to some cutting-edge developments – it's fine." Ludovic Hunter-Tilney wrote in the Financial Times that "David Bowie was bound for higher things, but the lively opportunism of Davie Jones was part of his make-up as well."

== Track listings ==
All songs written by David Bowie (as David Jones), unless noted. Original release information listed for each track.

=== CD edition ===
1. "You've Got a Habit of Leaving" – Davie Jones & The Lower Third (Parlophone R 5315) – 2:31
2. "I Want Your Love" (Note: Written by Johnnie Dee and Jack Tarr.) (Note: Released online on 15 July 2026.) – Davie Jones & The Lower Third (unissued) (Note: A demo pressing of this track was sold at auction in 2021.) – 2:32
3. "Cupid" – Davie Jones & The Lower Third (unissued) – 3:05
4. "I Pity the Fool" (Note: Written by Don Robey (as Deadric Malone).) – The Manish Boys (Parlophone R 5250) – 2:12
5. "Baby Loves That Way" – Davie Jones & The Lower Third (Parlophone R 5315) – 3:00
6. "Keep Up with the Jones" (instrumental) – Davie Jones & The Lower Third (unissued) – 2:02
7. "Leave Her to Me" – Davie Jones & The Lower Third (unissued) – 2:48
8. "I'll Follow You" – Davie Jones & The Lower Third (Early On (1964–1966)) – 1:59
9. "You Gotta Tell Her" – Davie Jones & The Lower Third (unissued) – 2:37
10. "Take My Tip" – The Manish Boys (Parlophone R 5250) – 2:13
11. "Certain Woman" – Davie Jones & The Lower Third (unissued) – 3:31
12. "Glad I've Got Nobody" – Davie Jones & The Lower Third (Early On (1964–1966)) – 2:28
13. "Today" – Davie Jones (unissued) – 2:26
14. "I Want My Baby Back" – Davie Jones (Early On (1964–1966)) – 2:38
15. "I Live in Dreams" – Davie Jones (unissued) – 2:56
16. "Bars of the County Jail" – Davie Jones (Early On (1964–1966)) – 2:06
17. "That's Where My Heart Is" – Davie Jones (Early On (1964–1966)) – 2:40
18. "I Do Believe I Love You" – Davie Jones (unissued) – 2:10
19. "You’ve Got a Habit of Leaving" (alternative overdub/vocal) – Davie Jones & The Lower Third (Making Time: A Shel Talmy Production) – 2:32
20. "I Pity the Fool" (alternative vocal) – The Manish Boys (Early On (1964–1966)) – 2:11
21. "Baby Loves That Way" (alternative vocal) – Davie Jones & The Lower Third (unissued) – 3:04
22. "Take My Tip" (alternative vocal) – The Manish Boys (Early On (1964–1966)) – 2:18

=== LP edition ===
Side one

1. "You've Got a Habit of Leaving" – Davie Jones and The Lower Third
2. "I Pity The Fool" – The Manish Boys
3. "Baby Loves That Way" – Davie Jones & The Lower Third
4. "I'll Follow You" – Davie Jones & The Lower Third
5. "Take My Tip" – The Manish Boys
6. "Glad I've Got Nobody – Davie Jones & The Lower Third

Side two

1. "I Want Your Love" – Davie Jones & The Lower Third
2. "Cupid" – Davie Jones & The Lower Third
3. "Keep Up with the Jones" (instrumental) – Davie Jones & The Lower Third
4. "Certain Woman" – Davie Jones & The Lower Third
5. "Leave Her to Me" – Davie Jones & The Lower Third
6. "You Gotta Tell Her" – Davie Jones & The Lower Third

Track listing notes

== Charts ==
Chart performance for The Shel Talmy Recordings
Chart (2026)	Peak position
Austrian Albums (Ö3 Austria)	56
Belgian Albums (Ultratop Flanders)	20
Belgian Albums (Ultratop Wallonia)	14
Croatian International Albums (HDU)	14
Danish Vinyl Albums (Hitlisten)	5
Dutch Albums (Album Top 100)	42
French Albums (SNEP)	106
Hungarian Physical Albums (MAHASZ)	9
Hungarian Vinyl Albums (MAHASZ)	6
Italian Physical Albums (FIMI)	15
Japanese Western Albums (Oricon)	24
Norwegian Physical Albums (IFPI Norge)	3
Scottish Albums (Official Charts)	3
Swedish Physical Albums (Sverigetopplistan)	10
Swiss Albums (Schweizer Hitparade)	35
UK Albums (Official Charts)	17
