= Everyone Says "Hi" =

Song by David Bowie

"Everyone Says 'Hi'"

Single by David Bowie

from the album Heathen
- B-side: "Safe"
- Released: 16 September 2002
- Recorded: October 2001 – January 2002
- Studio: Looking Glass (New York City); Sub Urban (London)
- Genre: Pop
- Length: 3:59 (album version); 3:29 (radio edit)
- Label: ISO; Columbia
- Songwriter: David Bowie
- Producers: Brian Rawling; Gary Miller; Tony Visconti

David Bowie singles chronology
"Slow Burn" (2002)	"Everyone Says 'Hi'" (2002)	"I've Been Waiting for You" (2002)

Music video
- "Everyone Says 'Hi'" on YouTube

"Everyone Says 'Hi'" is a song by the English musician David Bowie for his twenty-third studio album Heathen (2002). It was written by Bowie and primarily produced by the duo Brian Rawling and Gary Miller, with additional production by Tony Visconti. A pop song, it features a lush and sentimental arrangement, with lyrics meditating on bereavement and denial. The song was released as the second single from the album on 16 September 2002, through ISO and Columbia Records. The single peaked at number 20 on the UK Singles Chart and also reached number 83 in the German Singles Chart. Bowie performed the song live throughout 2002 on the Heathen Tour and on television appearances. "Everyone Says 'Hi'" has been covered by Rawling and Miller under the alias Metro in 2003 and by the German singer Claudia Brücken in 2013.

== Recording ==
David Bowie and Tony Visconti recorded an acoustic version of "Everyone Says 'Hi'" (guitar and vocals) between October 2001 and January 2002 at Looking Glass Studios in New York City, during the mixing sessions for Heathen (2002). Bowie's longtime guitarist Carlos Alomar contributed additional guitar. Afterwards, the song was outsourced to the producers Brian Rawling and Gary Miller, who created the final track at Sub Urban Studios in London. Rawling had previously co-produced Cher's "Believe" (1998), while Miller was known for his collaborations with the trio Stock Aitken Waterman in the 1980s. The duo added new instrumentation to the track, with contributions from the bassist John Reid, the percussionist Sola Akingbola of Jamiroquai, the cellist Philip Sheppard and the keyboardist Dave Clayton. Miller explained: "It started off like a remix, but ended up as a fully fledged production."

Reeves Gabrels, Bowie's guitarist throughout the 1990s and close creative partner up until a few years before Heathen was released, said that "Everyone Says 'Hi'" was the only song Bowie made after his departure that he heard "because someone told me that David wrote that for me. That made me cry."

== Music and lyrics ==
Several reviewers compared the song's musical sound to the pop of Bowie's 1971 song "Kooks", with Chris Jones of BBC Music calling "Everyone Says 'Hi'" a "sequel" to "Kooks". "Everyone Says 'Hi'" features a lush and sentimental arrangement to present a meditation on bereavement and denial. Described by the author David Buckley as the album's saddest song, the song's character desires to leave home for better opportunities. The author James E. Perone opines that the track upholds "the general sense of disillusionment and disconnection" that pervades the Heathen album. In a 2002 interview, Bowie stated that the song came from a place of reflection on his father's death in 1969: "[T]his one was just a little simplistic reference to that, about how it always feels like somebody has gone on a holiday of some kind. And there's something sad about ships as well. That's why this person in this song doesn't go on a plane. A ship took them away – I guess that's the boat that took people over the river Styx, isn't it?"

== Release and live performances ==
"Everyone Says 'Hi'" was originally released on Heathen as the album's tenth track, with a length of 3:59. Originally scheduled to be released as a single in European territories in June 2002, its release was delayed to 16 September, with an edited length of 3:29. It appeared as a 3-CD set, with bonus tracks from the Heathen and Toy sessions: "Safe", "Baby Loves That Way" and "Sunday (Tony Visconti Mix)" feature on the European single. The single peaked at number 20 on the UK singles chart. It was supported by a music video shot on the Heathen Tour in Cologne on 16 July 2002.

Bowie performed "Everyone Says 'Hi'" live throughout the Heathen Tour in 2002. The song was also performed during several television appearances during the tour, including on The Tonight Show with Jay Leno, Live with Regis and Kelly, Parkinson and Top of the Pops. The song was also featured in a BBC radio session on 18 September 2002. A previously unreleased performance from the Montreux Jazz Festival on 18 July 2002 was released on the box set I Can't Give Everything Away (2002–2016) in 2025.

Nicholas Pegg calls "Everyone Says 'Hi'" one of Bowie's "most emotionally affecting songs". The Guardian's Alexis Petridis called the song "lovely" in his review of Heathen. In another review, Chris Jones of BBC Music called the song "the chirpiest thing [Bowie] has done in years". In a list ranking every Bowie single, Ultimate Classic Rock placed "Everyone Says 'Hi'" at number 87 (out of 119).

== Covers ==
In January 2003, Brian Rawling and Gary Miller, the original song's producers, released a seven-minute remix of "Everyone Says 'Hi'" as a 12 in (300 mm) vinyl promotional single in North America, under the moniker Metro. Pegg calls this remix "horrible". An "interactive" version of this "Metro mix" was featured in the 2003 PlayStation 2 video game Amplitude, while a shortened radio edit was released on the War Child charity album Hope the same year and later included on I Can't Give Everything Away (2002–2016) in 2025.

In 2003, the German singer Claudia Brücken covered "Everyone Says 'Hi'" for her album The Lost Are Found. The song was produced by Stephen Hague and released as a single in the UK and Germany on 18 March 2013. When asked why she covered the song, Brücken explained: "Stephen & I wanted to do an album of covers that was 'melancholy, but not miserable', we are both big fans of Bowie and thought this song fit the bill perfectly." Its accompanying music video references Bowie's Major Tom character.

== Track listing ==
UK version 1

1. "Everyone Says 'Hi' (Radio edit)" – 3:29
2. "Safe" – 4:43
3. "Wood Jackson" – 4:48

UK version 2

1. "Everyone Says 'Hi' (Radio edit)" – 3:29
2. "When the Boys Come Marching Home" – 4:46
3. "Shadow Man" – 4:46

UK version 3

1. "Everyone Says 'Hi' (Radio edit)" – 3:29
2. "Baby Loves That Way" – 4:44
3. "You've Got a Habit of Leaving" – 4:51

European version 1

1. "Everyone Says 'Hi' (Radio edit)" – 3:29
2. "Safe" – 4:43
3. "Baby Loves That Way" – 4:44
4. "Sunday (Tony Visconti mix)" – 4:56

European version 2

1. "Everyone Says 'Hi' (Radio edit)" – 3:29
2. "Safe" – 4:43

12" promo version

1. "Everyone Says 'Hi' (Metro remix)"
2. "Everyone Says 'Hi' (Metro remix – Radio edit)"
3. "I Took a Trip on a Gemini Spaceship (Deepsky's Space Cowboy remix)"

== Charts ==
Chart performance for "Everyone Says 'Hi'"
Chart (2002)	Peak position
Germany (GfK)	83
UK Singles (OCC)	20
US Dance Club Songs (Billboard)	40

== Personnel ==
According to Chris O'Leary and Benoît Clerc:

- David Bowie – lead and backing vocals, keyboards
- Tony Visconti – acoustic guitar, backing vocal
- Carlos Alomar – rhythm guitar
- John Read – bass
- Brian Rawling – programming
- Gary Miller – guitar, programming
- Dave Clayton – keyboards, piano
- Philip Sheppard – cello
- Sola Akingbola – percussion

Technical

- Brian Rawling – producer
- Tony Visconti – producer
- Gary Miller – producer, mixing
