= American Hunters and Shooters Association =

American non-profit organization

- Type: Social Welfare Organization
- Legal status: 501(c)(4)
- Region served: USA
- President: Ray Schoenke
- Website: www.huntersandshooters.org (defunct)

The American Hunters and Shooters Association (AHSA) was a United States–based non-profit 501(c)(4) organization which operated from 2005 to 2010. The group described itself as a national grassroots organization for responsible gun ownership and advocated for increased gun control. The organization's president, Ray Schoenke, said the AHSA was intended to bridge the gap between urban liberals and rural gun owners, but closed down due to a lack of support from the Obama administration.

Critics, including the National Rifle Association of America, questioned whether the membership was representative of gun owners and suggested it was a front organization for gun control advocates.

== Description ==
The AHSA described itself as "... a national grassroots organization committed to safe and responsible gun ownership" and "... a mainstream group of hunters who are looking to belong to a gun owners association that doesn't have a radical agenda", and as a moderate, common-sense advocacy organization. It favored most restrictions on firearms, but believed that little progress will be made until gun owners are allowed to bring their common-sense perspective to the table.

In March 2008, Brady Campaign President Paul Helmke stated that he saw his organization's issues "as complementary to" those of the AHSA.

Despite the similarity in name, AHSA had no ties to the field marksmanship promoting organization, the Hunter's Shooting Association (HSA).

== History ==
In June 2006, Executive Director Bob Ricker formally introduced AHSA at a press conference at the annual conference of the Outdoor Writers Association of America. Ricker said at this conference that the NRA and other 2nd Amendment rights organizations did not address the specific concerns of hunters – protecting hunting lands and wildlife habitats – which led to the creation of AHSA. In 2007, President Ray Schoenke addressed the Mayors Against Illegal Guns Coalition. As of October 19, 2010, The AHSA website has been taken down. President Schoenke stated that the group was closed because of lack of membership.

== Stated goals ==
The AHSA web site indicated four general programs:

- "Protecting our sporting heritage"
- "Hunting and fishing conservation"
- "Gun safety"
- "Law enforcement training, outreach and development"

== Leadership ==
The leaders of the AHSA were:

- Ray Schoenke, Founding President. A former football player for the Washington Redskins, Schoenke ran for Governor of Maryland in 1998 as a Democrat. He is a millionaire and has contributed to numerous Democratic politicians and causes. Schoenke has donated to Handgun Control, Inc., which actively lobbies to ban some types of firearms, and he was on the Maryland Governor's Commission on Gun Violence in 1996.
- Joseph J. Vince Jr., a member of the Board of Directors is the former chief of the BATF's crime guns analysis branch. Currently, he is a principal of Crime Gun Solutions. Crime Gun Solutions has worked for the Brady Center, providing data analysis supportive of the Federal Assault Weapons Act, and has provided ballistics evidence and analysis in lawsuits against firearm dealers. He was a signer on a letter submitted to Congress opposing the Protection of Lawful Commerce in Arms Act
- Jody Powell, co-chairman of the AHSA Advisory Board
- A. Austin Dorr, co-chairman of the AHSA Advisory Board
- John E. Rosenthal, a founding member of AHSA who left in 2007, is one of the founders of Stop Handgun Violence, a group which has been influential in instituting strong restrictions on the ownership of firearms in the state of Massachusetts.

== Endorsements ==
The AHSA endorsed U.S. Senator Barack Obama for president in the 2008 general election: AHSA endorsed Obama based mainly on Obama's vote for the Disaster Recovery Personal Protection Act. In 2008, the Obama campaign paid for Shoenke to travel to 40 events in Ohio, Pennsylvania, Florida and Colorado to address pro-gun voters.

The AHSA endorsed the following congressional candidates:

- Jim Esch [D] (Nebraska – District 2)
- Eric Massa [D] (New York – District 29)
- Walt Minnick [D] (Idaho – District 1)
- Harry Teague [D] (New Mexico – District 2) – Harry Teague's campaign declined the endorsement.

ASHA officials testified in favor of gun control legislation, such as Washington State Bill SB-5197, which aims to restrict private transactions at gun shows and create a database of gun owners.

ASHA supported the call by the coalition of Mayors Against Illegal Guns to repeal the Tiahrt Amendment, which restricts gun trace data. Repeal of the amendment is supported by more than 20 national and state police organizations but opposed by the BATFE and Fraternal Order of Police, on the grounds that repeal would jeopardize lives and law enforcement operations.

== Position in D.C. v Heller (2008) ==
AHSA joined in the amicus curiae brief of Maj. Gen. John D. Altenburg Jr., et al., in the Supreme Court case of D.C. v Heller, arguing that the individual right of the people to keep and bear arms enhances the collective goal of supporting national defense, and that the dichotomy between individual right argued by Heller and collective militia right argued by D.C. is false: the Second Amendment protects both.

== Criticism from the NRA ==
The National Rifle Association of America (NRA) criticized the AHSA for its members' associations with other gun-control organizations and gun-control legislation. NRA-ILA Executive Director Chris Cox characterized the AHSA as "the latest front group for the anti-gun movement." In August 2005, the NRA said about the AHSA "they want to allow the FBI to keep records on law-abiding citizens who buy guns and put an end to gun shows as we know them. Not to mention the fact that they want to regulate .50 caliber rifles in the same way that machine guns are regulated."
