= Stop Handgun Violence =

American non-profit organization

- Formation: 1994
- Founder: John Rosenthal and Michael Kennedy
- Location: Beverly, Massachusetts
- Website: stophandgunviolence.org

Stop Handgun Violence is a Boston, Massachusetts-based 501(c)(3) non-profit organization that works to reduce and prevent injuries and deaths caused by firearms in the United States. The group advocates personal responsibility, public awareness, stronger legislation, increased gun manufacturer responsibility, and strict law enforcement.

Stop Handgun Violence was founded in 1995 by Boston developer John Rosenthal with Michael Kennedy, son of assassinated former U.S. attorney general and presidential candidate Robert F. Kennedy. Rosenthal says that he was inspired to cofound the group when "I learned that 15 kids under 19 died every day in this country from the only consumer product in America that is not regulated." Rosenthal, President of the real estate development firm Meredith Management, has a history of social activism. He led protests against nuclear proliferation in the 1970s, launched the non-profit Friends of Boston's Homeless in the 1980s, founded Stop Handgun Violence in 1995, cofounded Common Sense About Kids and Guns in 1999, and cofounded the American Hunters and Shooters Association in 2005. Stop Handgun Violence has shown a particular concern with the ease with which firearms can be purchased at gun shows. It is also concerned about how easily children, the mentally ill, felons, and potential terrorists can gain access to firearms.

== Public awareness ==
Stop Handgun Violence has implemented several media and public awareness campaigns, the centerpiece of which is America's largest billboard, located on the Massachusetts Turnpike adjacent to Fenway Park in Boston. In 2008, the 252-foot billboard, which Rosenthal owns, displayed the message "We Sell Guns! Criminals and Terrorists Welcome, No ID or Background Check Required," an ironic reference to the ease of buying firearms at gun shows. Previous displays, many designed by the Modernista! ad agency in Boston, have held messages such as "You Shoot. Your Family Pays" and a fake ransom demand, "We Have Your President and Congress – NRA." The billboard is required to be removed by the current owner of the property no later than March 2015. Other billboards have displayed photos of children who have been killed by gunfire.

== Criticism ==
Georgetown University law professor Randy Barnett said, in regard to Stop Handgun Violence's response to the Columbine High School massacre, that "It's impossible to push a button and make firearms disappear in this country. Furthermore, so far as we are aware, this crime was committed mainly with long-guns—not handguns—and home-made explosives [pipe-bombs] that no gun law can eliminate. ... We could eliminate all automobile accidents by getting rid of all automobiles."

== See also ==
- Brady Campaign
- Coalition to Stop Gun Violence
- Joyce Foundation
- Legal Community Against Violence
- Mayors Against Illegal Guns
- Violence Policy Center
