= Markus Klinko =

Swiss fashion and celebrity photographer

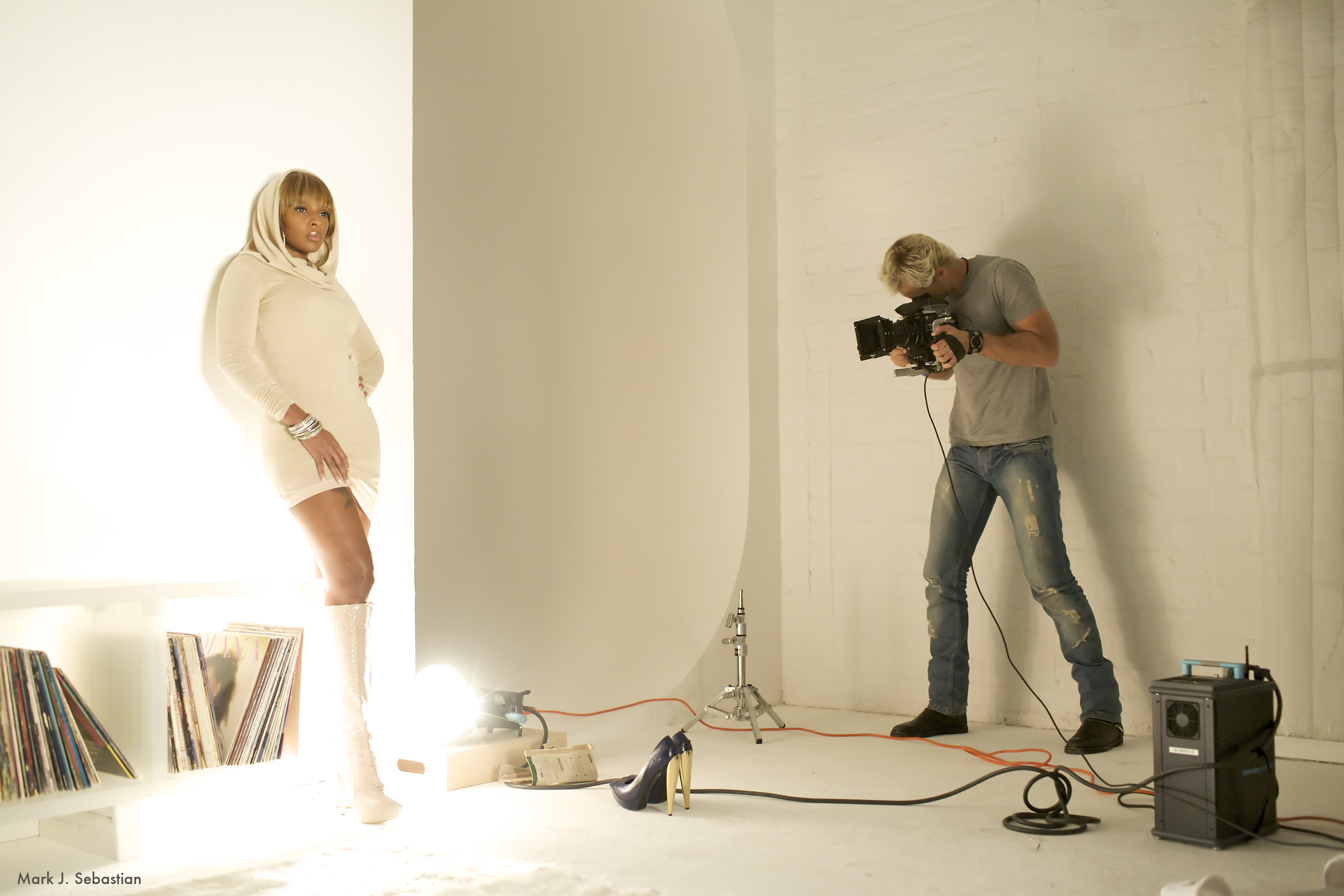
Mary J. Blige & Markus Klinko

Markus Klinko is an international fashion/celebrity photographer and director.

Klinko has photographed Beyoncé, Lady Gaga, David Bowie, Jennifer Lopez, Britney Spears, Mary J. Blige, Mariah Carey, Kanye West, Anne Hathaway, Kate Winslet, Will Smith, Christina Aguilera, Keanu Reeves, Ice Spice, Becky G, Eva Mendes, Kim Kardashian, Naomi Campbell, Daphne Guinness and Iman. His editorial clients include Vogue, GQ, Vanity Fair, Harper's Bazaar, and Interview magazine. Brands such as Lancôme, L'Oréal Paris, Nike, Hugo Boss, Anna Sui, Pepsi, Skyy Vodka, and Remy Martin have hired Klinko to create advertising campaigns. His campaign for Keep A Child Alive raised over one million dollars for children with AIDS in just a few days.

== Early life and music career ==
Klinko was born in Switzerland of French, Italian, Jewish and Hungarian descent, and spent his early years training to become a classical harp soloist. He studied at the Conservatoire National Supérieur de Musique in Paris under Pierre Jamet and Lily Laskine. Later, Klinko signed an exclusive recording contract with EMI Classics, as well as a management contract with Columbia Artists Management. He received the Grand Prix de Disque for his recording of French harp music, with members of the orchestra of the Paris Opera Bastille. Klinko performed in recitals and as a featured soloist with symphony orchestras around the world. He was also regularly featured in such publications as Vogue Italia, Vanity Fair, GQ, The New York Times, Madame Figaro, Stereo Review, and Ongaku no Tomo.

== Photographic career ==
After a hand injury in 1994, Klinko decided to become a fashion photographer and retired from his international concert and recording career. During this time Klinko met Indrani, who became a regular collaborator in her role as his studio's digital post production artist, retoucher and photo editor.

Isabella Blow discovered Klinko's work while at the London Sunday Times and commissioned cover stories from the emerging photographer. Around the same time, Ingrid Sischy, at Interview magazine hired Klinko for various shoots. Iman and David Bowie followed, giving the up-and-coming photographer a chance to photograph them for their respective book (I am Iman) and album covers (Heathen).

From there, he went on to create some of the most iconic album covers of his time, including Beyonce's Dangerously in Love, and Mariah Carey's The Emancipation of Mimi.

Many of Klinko's famous celebrity photographs can be seen in his coffee table book ICONS (Perseus). Lincoln Center in New York presented an art exhibit showcasing many prints from the book and since then, art galleries and museums in Europe, such as the National Portrait Gallery, Washington and Markowicz Fine Art have featured his work.

Klinko has appeared on E! News, Access Hollywood, FashionTelevision, CNN's Showbiz Tonight and Larry King Live and has been the subject of the reality show Double Exposure.
