= Glen Tonche =

Coordinates: 42.0030°N 74.1886°W

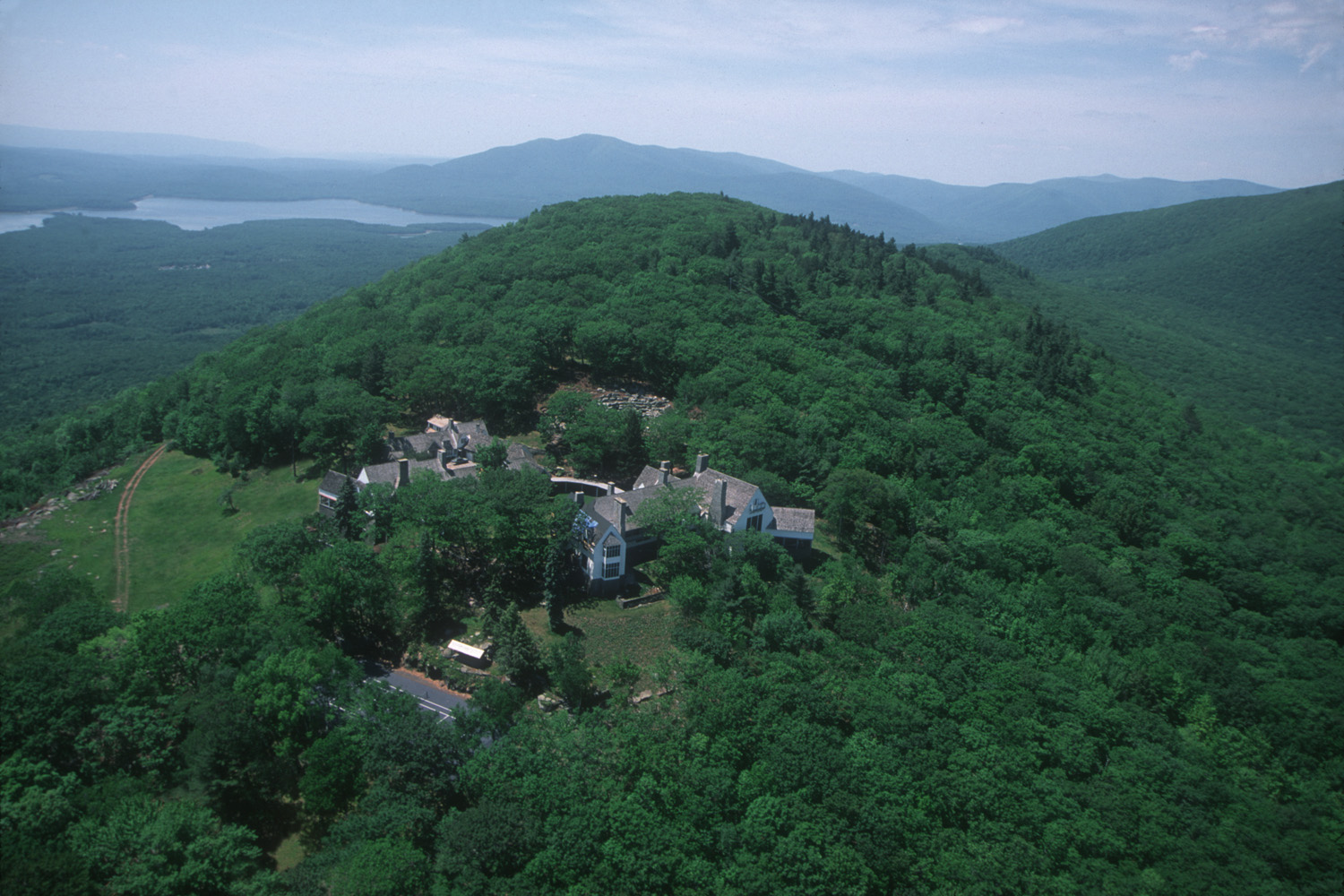
- Glen Tonche – Allaire Studios
- Interactive map of the Glen Tonche area
- Alternative names: Allaire Studios

General information
- Status: Extant
- Type: Private family estate
- Architectural style: Tudor
- Location: Ulster County, near Shokan, New York, United States
- Completed: 1928; 98 years ago
- Owner: • Raymond Pitcairn and later the Pitcairn family (1928–1998) • Randall Wallace (since 1998)

Glen Tonche is an estate atop Mount Tonche, in Ulster County, near Shokan, New York.

The estate's house was built in 1928 as the summer family compound of American businessman Raymond Pitcairn, whose family founded PPG Industries. Since 1999 the property has been the location of Allaire Studios, a recording facility.

== Design ==
Under Pitcairn ownership the 18,740-square-foot (1,741-square-metre) compound on 22 acres (9 hectares) was largely made up of two main wings connected by a covered walkway. The balance of Mount Tonche – over 1,000 acres (4.0 square kilometres) – is under restrictive preservation.

The property as a whole reflects a blend of Tudor-style architecture with some Arts-and-Crafts influences. The south wing was a pentagon configuration housing the main kitchen, two servants' quarters, six guest bedrooms, six full baths, and a massive glass-enclosed mountaintop porch. The wing also featured a 29-by-36-foot dining hall capable of seating 100 or more guests. The north wing housed the library, eleven bedrooms, seven full baths and two-and-one-half baths, three-room servant's quarters, as well as a great room with 30-foot-tall (9.1-metre) floor-to-ceiling windows and 60-foot-high (18-metre) vaulted ceilings.

== Transfer from Pitcairn ownership ==
The estate remained in the Pitcairn family until it was put on the market in 1995 for $3.9 million, then $2.9 million, then in late 1998 down to $1.95 million, at which time it was sold to photographer and musician Randall Wallace, who then opened Allaire Studios on the property.

== Allaire Studios ==
Since its opening in 1999, Allaire Studios has encouraged recording artists to stay in residence at the facility while recording. Thanks to windows that stretch from the floors to ceilings, the studio offers expansive panoramas of the Ashokan reservoir. The first album recorded at Allaire was Harvest Home, by Jay Ungar, in 1999. Singer-songwriter Norah Jones initially recorded her debut album Come Away with Me at Allaire; the album was rejected by her record label and re-recorded elsewhere for a 2002 release. (A 2022 anniversary rerelease of the album included many of the tracks recorded at Allaire.) In September 2002 the studio reopened after a substantial renovation. In collaboration with the acoustician George Augspurger, designer John Storyk developed a program for a “Great Hall,” a 2,000-square-foot live environment with 23-foot windows that can accommodate sessions of more than 50 musicians. Storyk also designed a new control room and smaller live studio. David Bowie recorded some of his album Heathen at Allaire in 2002, as well as Reality in 2003. During five weeks in late 2006, the rock band Rush recorded the album Snakes & Arrows (2007). Grizzly Bear recorded Veckatimest at Allaire in 2009 and Shields in 2012. In 2020, the singer-songwriter Clairo spent a month in Allaire Studios recording her second album, Sling, with record producer Jack Antonoff.

The producer John Leckie reportedly said that Allaire is his favorite studio for mixing. Allaire was nominated for two Outstanding Creative Achievements by the Technical Excellence and Creativity Awards in the category of Studio Design Project in 2003.

== See also ==
- 1928 in architecture
- List of buildings and structures
