= Doc to Dock =

American non-profit aid organization

Doc to Dock is a Brooklyn, New York-based 501(c)(3) non-profit organization that sends donated medical supplies and equipment to hospitals and clinics in Africa and Haiti. It was founded in 2005 by cardiologist and medical professor Bruce Charash.

Thousands of tons of medical supplies are discarded in the United States every day. This occurs largely because U.S. government regulations force hospitals to discard any unused medical supplies in an opened outer package, even if the remaining items are individually wrapped and sterile. These supplies are either incinerated or deposited in landfills. Meanwhile, in developing nations, thousands of patients are turned away from hospitals and medical centers due to a lack of supplies. Charash created Doc to Dock to rectify this imbalance. The organization also benefits the U.S. environment by reducing the strain on landfills.

== Founding ==
Doc to Dock was born as the result of an appeal made by former U.S. president Bill Clinton at the first summit meeting of the Clinton Foundation’s Clinton Global Initiative in late 2005. The corporate, political, and other leaders who make up the Initiative’s membership are required to commit to projects that benefit humankind and to report on their progress each year. Charash conceived of his commitment at the inaugural meeting and founded Doc to Dock soon afterward. Doc to Dock helped inspire Danielle Butin to create the Afya Foundation, after meeting with Doc to Dock founder Dr. Charash. After he explained the model of operations of Doc to Dock, Ms. Butin founded Afya, which is likewise a inspired foundation that does remarkable work in Africa and Haiti.

== Model ==
The organization accepts almost any type of medical supplies, including catheters, IV lines, and walkers. It also accepts capital equipment such as ultrasound machines and operating tables. It works with a number of hospitals, mainly in the U.S. Northeast, that place recycling bins in operating rooms and other areas. Doc to Dock also accepts donations from pharmaceutical and medical product companies, as well as from individual donors. For example, some individuals who have purchased hospital beds for home use have donated them once they are no longer needed.

After sorting the supplies and testing the equipment, volunteers store the materials in warehouses. They ship supplies only when specific requests are made, and the materials go directly to the recipient hospital or clinic. It costs about $25,000 to ship a 40-foot container containing supplies with an average wholesale value of $500,000. Doc to Dock depends on financial donations and grants to fund such shipments. Recipient institutions have included hospitals and clinics in Haiti, Senegal, Benin, Ethiopia, Kenya, Lesotho, Liberia, Uganda, Malawi, Mali, and Ghana.

After the tragic 2010 earthquake, Dr. Charash and other Board members of Doc to Dock flew to Haiti with a private plane filled with medical supplies as well as hospital donated antibiotics and analgesics, delivered to a children's hospital in Port au Prince. Doc to Dock further provided the supplies to fill 8 40-foot containers of supplies for use in various hospitals impacted by the earthquake, delivered in partnership with the US Navy's medical ship, the USNS Comfort. Abigail Disney and her charitable foundation provided substantial funding for this operation. President Clinton, and Nancy Dorsinville at the United Nations, arranged access for Doc to Dock for ground clearance for our relief air delivery at the airport in Port au Prince, as well as arranging trucks and security for the oft loading and delivery of the vitally needed cargo.

== Partner organizations ==
Doc to Dock collaborates with a number of other organizations, which recommend medical facilities in developing nations and provide contacts. Partners have included the Earth Institute at Columbia University, the American Friends of Kenya, the United Nations, MedShare, the REMEDY program at Yale-New Haven Hospital, the MERCI program at the University of Virginia Health Sciences Center, the James Jordan Foundation, the Doctors Choice Community Health Network, Gleaning for the World, the Clinton HIV/AIDS Initiative, Project C.U.R.E., and SVQF.
