= David Bowie discography =

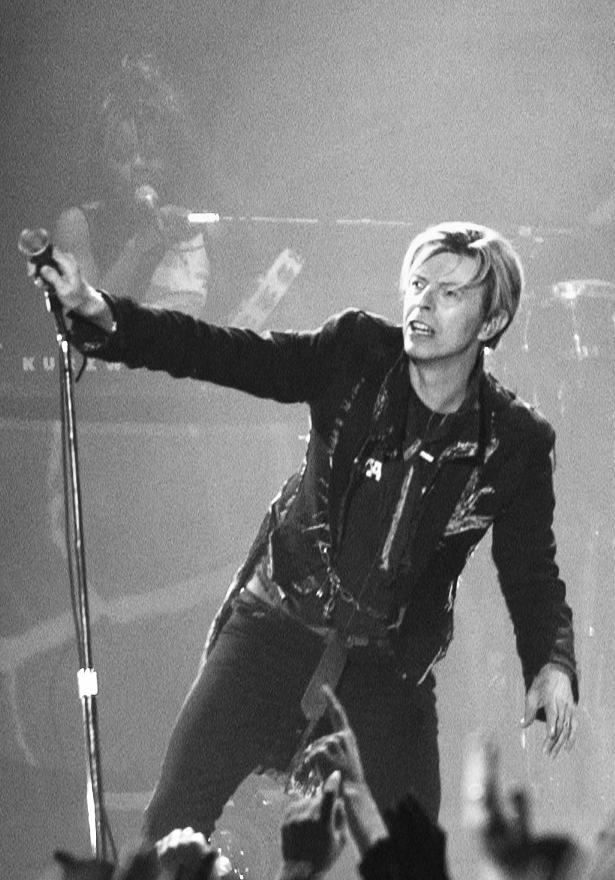
- Bowie performing in 2003
- Studio albums: 26
- EPs: 8
- Soundtrack albums: 2
- Live albums: 9
- Compilation albums: 25
- Singles: 128
- Video albums: 28
- Music videos: 72
- Posthumous studio albums: 1
- Posthumous live albums: 14
- Posthumous compilation albums: 1
- Posthumous soundtrack albums: 1
- Box sets: 16

During his lifetime, the English singer-songwriter David Bowie (1947–2016) released 26 studio albums, nine live albums, two soundtrack albums, 26 compilation albums, eight extended plays, 128 singles and six box sets. Since his death, one further studio album, 13 live albums, one soundtrack album, one compilation album, four extended plays and six box sets have been released. Bowie also released 28 video albums and 72 music videos. Throughout his lifetime, Bowie sold at least 100 million records worldwide. In 2012, Bowie was ranked the ninth-best-selling singles artist in the United Kingdom, with 10.6 million singles sold. As of January 2016, 12.09 million Bowie singles had been sold in Britain. In a period of 24 months since his death, five million records were sold in the UK, 3.1 million singles and two million albums.

Bowie's debut release was the 1964 single "Liza Jane" by Davie Jones & the King Bees. He released two more singles in 1965 under the names of the Manish Boys and Davy Jones, respectively. His first release using the name David Bowie was the 1966 single "Can't Help Thinking About Me", which was released with the Lower Third. His next single, "Do Anything You Say", also released in 1966, was the first release credited simply to "David Bowie". He released four more singles and his debut album, David Bowie, but the first success in the United Kingdom was with the 1969 single "Space Oddity". The single reached number five on the UK Singles Chart after it was released five days before the Apollo 11 Moon mission. The single was re-released in 1975 and became Bowie's first UK number-one single. Bowie released three more albums – David Bowie (1969), The Man Who Sold the World (1970), and Hunky Dory (1971) – before he eventually entered the UK Albums Chart with The Rise and Fall of Ziggy Stardust and the Spiders from Mars (1972), which peaked at number five. Its success saw sales of Hunky Dory improve, and that album eventually peaked at number three in the UK in 1973. RCA re-released the 1969 David Bowie (under the title Space Oddity) and The Man Who Sold the World, which respectively reached numbers 17 and 26 in the UK.

Bowie released nine more studio albums with RCA, all of which reached the top five of the UK Albums Chart; Aladdin Sane, Pin Ups (both 1973), Diamond Dogs (1974) and Scary Monsters (and Super Creeps) (1980) all reached number one. Young Americans included his first US number-one single "Fame". He then released three solo studio albums with EMI – Let's Dance (1983), whose title track became his first single to reach number one in both the UK and US, Tonight (1984) and Never Let Me Down (1987). Let's Dance and Tonight reached number one in the UK, while Never Let Me Down reached number six. The success of Let's Dance revitalised Bowie's back catalogue: throughout the summer of 1983, he had multiple albums on the UK Albums Chart. This peaked on 16 July that year, with ten entries – a figure bettered only by Elvis Presley.

From 1988 to 1992, Bowie performed as a member of the rock band Tin Machine, who released two studio albums before disbanding. Continuing as a solo artist, Black Tie White Noise (1993) reached number one on the UK Albums Chart. Despite numerous label changes throughout the decade, Bowie had further UK top ten success into the 2000s, from Outside (1995) to Reality (2003). After a ten-year hiatus, Bowie returned with The Next Day (2013), his first UK number one since Black Tie White Noise. His final album, Blackstar, was released on 8 January 2016, his 69th birthday and two days before his death on 10 January. The album debuted at number one in the UK and became his first album to reach number one on the Billboard 200 in the US. Since 2015, Parlophone has remastered Bowie's back catalogue through the "Era" box set series, starting with Five Years (1969–1973).

== Studio albums ==
=== Primary studio albums ===
List of studio albums, with selected chart positions and certifications
Title	Album details	Peak chart positions										Sales	Certifications
Title	Album details	UK	AUS	AUT	GER	NL	NOR	NZ	SWE	SWI	US	Sales	Certifications
David Bowie	Released: 1 June 1967 (Note: David Bowie (1967) was released in the US in August.); Label: Deram; Formats: LP	125 (Note: David Bowie (1967) chart position for the 2010 deluxe edition re-release.)	—	—	—	—	—	—	—	—	—		
David Bowie (Note: David Bowie (1969) was the original name for the album in the UK, while in the US it was released a few months later as Man of Words / Man of Music (1969). Following the success of Ziggy Stardust, the album was rereleased worldwide as Space Oddity, after Bowie's well-known song of the same name that opened the album. In 2009, a worldwide release returned the original name to the album.)	Released: 14 November 1969; Label: Philips, Mercury; Formats: LP	17 (Note: Chart positions for the 1972 re-releases of David Bowie as Space Oddity following the success of Ziggy Stardust.)	21	—	—	—	—	—	—	66	16		BPI: Gold
The Man Who Sold the World	Released: 4 November 1970; Label: Mercury; Formats: LP, MC, 8-track	24 (Note: Chart positions for the 1972 re-releases of The Man Who Sold the World following the success of Ziggy Stardust.)	44	—	—	48	—	—	—	—	105		BPI: Gold
Hunky Dory	Released: 17 December 1971; Label: RCA; Formats: LP, MC, 8-track	3 (Note: Hunky Dory did not enter the charts until September 1972, following the success of Ziggy Stardust.)	39	52	53	—	23	30	16	32	57		BPI: Platinum; RMNZ: Gold
The Rise and Fall of Ziggy Stardust and the Spiders from Mars	Released: 16 June 1972; Label: RCA; Formats: LP, MC, 8-track	5	11	34	12	61	17	20	19	21	21	UK: 1,500,000	BPI: 2× Platinum; RIAA: Gold; RMNZ: Platinum
Aladdin Sane	Released: 19 April 1973; Label: RCA; Formats: LP, MC, 8-track	1	7	—	65	4	11	—	9	—	17		BPI: Platinum; RIAA: Gold
Pin Ups	Released: 19 October 1973; Label: RCA; Formats: LP, MC, 8-track	1	4	—	—	6	8	—	1	—	23		BPI: Gold; AUS: Gold
Diamond Dogs	Released: 24 May 1974; Label: RCA; Formats: LP, MC, 8-track	1	3	—	40	—	8	—	4	—	5		BPI: Gold; GLF: Gold; RIAA: Gold
Young Americans	Released: 7 March 1975; Label: RCA; Formats: LP, MC, 8-track	2	9	—	—	—	13	3	6	92	9		BPI: Gold; MC: Gold; RIAA: Gold
Station to Station	Released: 23 January 1976; Label: RCA; Formats: LP, MC, 8-track	5	8	47	91	3	8	9	11	65	3		BPI: Gold; MC: Gold; RIAA: Gold
Low	Released: 14 January 1977; Label: RCA; Formats: LP, MC, 8-track	2	10	16	84	6	10	12	12	40	11		BPI: Gold; MC: Gold
"Heroes"	Released: 14 October 1977; Label: RCA; Formats: LP, MC, 8-track	3	6	19	44	3	13	15	13	34	35		BPI: Gold; MC: Gold; RMNZ: Gold
Lodger	Released: 18 May 1979; Label: RCA; Formats: LP, MC, 8-track	4	11	13	—	5	11	3	9	—	20		BPI: Gold; NVPI: Gold
Scary Monsters (and Super Creeps)	Released: 12 September 1980; Label: RCA; Formats: LP, MC, 8-track	1	1	20	8	3	3	1	4	75	12	GER: 70,000	BPI: Platinum; AUS: Platinum; MC: Platinum
Let's Dance	Released: 14 April 1983; Label: EMI; Formats: LP, MC, 8-track, CD	1	1	2	2	1	1	1	1	17	4		BPI: Platinum; MC: 5× Platinum; NVPI: Platinum; RIAA: Platinum
Tonight	Released: 24 September 1984; Label: EMI America; Formats: LP, MC, 8-track, CD	1	4	8	8	1	3	4	4	8	11		BPI: Gold; MC: 2× Platinum; RIAA: Platinum
Never Let Me Down	Released: 21 April 1987; Label: EMI America; Formats: LP, MC, CD	6	19	3	11	9	3	14	2	18	34		BPI: Gold; MC: Platinum; RIAA: Gold
Black Tie White Noise	Released: 5 April 1993; Label: Savage, Arista; Formats: LP, MC, CD	1	12	18	15	8	8	8	18	18	39		BPI: Gold; MC: Gold
The Buddha of Suburbia	Released: 8 November 1993 (UK); Label: Arista; Formats: LP, MC, CD; TV serial: The Buddha of Suburbia (broadcast in 1993)	87	—	—	—	—	—	—	—	—	—		
Outside	Released: 26 September 1995; Label: Arista; Formats: LP, MC, CD	8	55	22	33	38	15	37	13	22	21	UK: 200,000	BPI: Silver
Earthling	Released: 3 February 1997; Label: Arista; Formats: LP, MC, CD	6	45	15	11	19	13	15	5	20	39		BPI: Silver
Hours	Released: 4 October 1999; Label: Virgin; Formats: LP, MC, CD, 2×CD, DD	5	33	2	4	31	4	21	2	18	47		BPI: Gold
Heathen	Released: 10 June 2002; Label: ISO/Columbia; Formats: LP, MC, CD, 2×CD, SACD, DD	5	9	4	4	19	2	22	6	7	14	UK: 217,000; US: 180,000	BPI: Gold
Reality	Released: 15 September 2003; Label: ISO/Columbia; Formats: LP, MC, CD, 2×CD, DualDisc, DD	3	13	3	3	14	2	14	5	5	29	US: 151,000	BPI: Gold; RMNZ: Gold
The Next Day	Released: 8 March 2013; Label: ISO/Columbia; Formats: LP, CD, DD	1	2	2	1	1	1	1	1	1	2	US: 208,000	BPI: Platinum; ARIA: Gold; BVMI: Gold; IFPI AUT: Gold; IFPI SWI: Gold; GLF: Gold; MC: Gold; RMNZ: Gold
Blackstar	Released: 8 January 2016; Label: ISO/Columbia; Formats: LP, CD, DD	1	1	1	1	1	1	1	1	1	1	US: 450,000; UK: 410,000	BPI: Platinum; ARIA: Platinum; BVMI: Gold; IFPI AUT: Platinum; IFPI SWI: Platinum; GLF: Gold; MC: Platinum; RIAA: Gold; RMNZ: Platinum
Posthumous
Toy	Released: 26 November 2021; Label: ISO, Parlophone; Formats: CD, LP, DD	5	—	4	3	4	17	—	28	7	—		
"—" denotes releases that did not chart.

=== Re-recorded studio albums ===
List of re-produced studio albums, with details and notes
Title	Album details
Never Let Me Down 2018	Released as part of the box set Loving the Alien (1983–1988) on 12 October 2018, and separately on 15 February 2019.

=== Studio albums as a member of Tin Machine ===
List of studio albums, with selected chart positions and certifications
Title	Album details	Peak chart positions										Certifications
Title	Album details	UK	AUS	AUT	GER	NL	NOR	NZ	SWE	SWI	US	Certifications
Tin Machine	Released: 22 May 1989; Label: EMI USA; Formats: LP, MC, CD	3	42	19	13	24	9	14	9	—	28	BPI: Gold
Tin Machine II	Released: 2 September 1991; Label: London; Formats: LP, MC, CD	23	—	25	56	33	14	—	19	—	126	
"—" denotes releases that did not chart.

== Live albums ==
List of live albums, with selected chart positions and certifications
Title	Album details	Peak chart positions										Sales	Certifications
Title	Album details	UK	AUS	ITA	GER	NL	NOR	NZ	SWE	SWI	US	Sales	Certifications
David Live	Released: 29 October 1974; Label: RCA; Formats: 2×LP, 2xMC, 8-track	2	9	99	—	89	12	—	10	—	8		RIAA: Gold
Stage	Released: 29 September 1978; Label: RCA; Formats: 2×LP, 2xMC, 8-track	5	11	—	—	2	18	1	29	—	44		BPI: Gold
Ziggy Stardust: The Motion Picture (all reissues since 2003 titled Ziggy Stardust and the Spiders from Mars: The Motion Picture)	Released: October 1983; Label: RCA; Formats: 2×LP, 2xMC; Film: Ziggy Stardust and the Spiders from Mars: The Motion Picture (released on VHS in 1984 and DVD in 2003)	10	67	—	—	—	—	39	42	34	89		
liveandwell.com (Note: The liveandwell.com album was a limited edition live release not available commercially but via subscribing to BowieNet.)	Released: 13 September 2000; Label: Risky Folio; Formats: CD	x	x	x	x	x	x	x	x	x	x		
Bowie at the Beeb	Released: 26 September 2000; Label: EMI; Formats: 2×CD	7	—	—	69	56	22	—	37	88	181		BPI: Gold
Glass Spider	Released: June 2007; Label: Immortal; Formats: CD, DD; Film: Glass Spider (released on VHS in 1988 and DVD in 2007)	—	—	—	—	—	—	—	—	—	—		
Live Santa Monica '72	Radio broadcast: 20 October 1972; Released: 30 June 2008; Label: EMI; Formats: LP, CD, DD	61	—	—	—	81	—	—	40	—	—	US: 10,000	
VH1 Storytellers	Released: 6 July 2009; Label: EMI; Formats: CD, CD+DVD, DD	114	—	—	—	—	—	—	—	—	—		
A Reality Tour	Released: 25 January 2010; Label: ISO/Columbia/Legacy; Formats: LP, CD, DD; Film: A Reality Tour (released on DVD in 2004)	53	91	—	—	57	—	—	56	39	—		
Posthumous
Live Nassau Coliseum '76	Radio broadcast: 23 March 1976; Released: 10 February 2017; Label: Parlophone; Formats: CD, LP, DD	—	—	—	—	—	—	—	—	—	—		
Cracked Actor (Live Los Angeles '74)	Released: 16 June 2017; Label: Rhino/Parlophone; Formats: CD, LP, DD	20	—	—	—	—	—	—	—	—	—		
Live in Berlin (1978)	Released: 2 March 2018; Label: Parlophone; Formats: LP	x	x	x	x	x	x	x	x	x	x		
Welcome to the Blackout (Live London '78)	Released: 21 April 2018; Label: Rhino/Parlophone; Formats: LP, CD, DD; Film: Untitled (Unreleased)	16	—	—	—	—	—	—	—	75	—		
Serious Moonlight (Live '83)	Released: 12 October 2018; Label: Parlophone; Formats: CD, LP, DD; Film: Serious Moonlight (released on VHS in 1984 and DVD in 2006)	—	—	—	—	—	—	—	—	—	—		
Glastonbury 2000	Released: 30 November 2018; Label: Parlophone; Formats: 2×CD, 3×LP, DD; Film: Glastonbury 2000 (released on DVD in 2018)	25	—	32	—	—	—	—	—	—	—		
ChangesNowBowie	Released: 17 April 2020; Label: Parlophone; Formats: CD, LP, DD	17	—	—	—	—	—	—	—	—	—		
Ouvrez le Chien (Live Dallas 95)	Released: 3 July 2020; Label: Parlophone; Formats: DD, streaming, CD, LP	32	—	—	—	—	—	—	—	—	—		
Something in the Air (Live Paris 99)	Released: 14 August 2020; Label: Parlophone; Formats: DD, streaming	16	—	—	—	—	—	—	—	—	—		
I'm Only Dancing (The Soul Tour 74)	Released: 29 August 2020; Label: Parlophone; Formats: 2×LP, 2×CD (Record Store Day ltd. ed.)	18	—	—	—	—	—	—	—	—	104		
No Trendy Réchauffé (Live Birmingham 95)	Released: 20 November 2020; Label: Parlophone; Formats: 2×LP, CD	86	—	—	—	—	—	—	—	—	—		
Look at the Moon! (Live Phoenix Festival 97)	Released: 12 February 2021; Label: Parlophone; Formats: 3×LP, 2×CD	16	—	—	—	—	—	—	—	—	—		
David Bowie at the Kit Kat Klub (Live New York 99)	Released: 2 April 2021; Label: Parlophone; Formats: 2×LP, 2×CD	20	—	—	—	—	—	—	—	—	—		
Ready, Set, Go! (Live, Riverside Studios '03)	Released: 12 April 2025; Label: Parlophone; Formats: 2×LP, CD	44	—	—	—	—	—	—	—	—	—		
"—" denotes releases that did not chart. "x" denotes not released in that territory.

=== Live albums as a member of Tin Machine ===
List of live albums
Title	Album details
Tin Machine Live: Oy Vey, Baby	Released: 2 July 1992; Label: London; Formats: LP, MC, CD; Film: Tin Machine Live: Oy Vey, Baby (released on VHS in 1992)
Tin Machine: Live at La Cigale, Paris, 25th June, 1989	Released: 30 August 2019; Label: Parlophone; Formats: DD, streaming

== Soundtrack albums ==
List of soundtracks, with selected chart positions
Title	Album details	Peak chart positions	
Title	Album details	UK	AUT
Christiane F.	Released: April 1981; Label: RCA; Formats: LP, MC; Film: Christiane F. (released in 1981)	—	3
Absolute Beginners (Various Artists including three new Bowie tracks)	Released: March 1986; Label: Virgin; Formats: 2×LP, MC, CD; Film: Absolute Beginners (released in 1986)	19	—
Labyrinth (with Trevor Jones)	Released: 23 June 1986; Label: EMI; Formats: LP, MC, CD; Film: Labyrinth (released in 1986)	38	—
Posthumous
Lazarus (with Lazarus New York Cast)	Released: 21 October 2016; Label: Columbia; Formats: 2×LP, 2×CD, DD; Musical: Lazarus	10	57
"—" denotes items which were not released in that country or failed to chart.

== Compilation albums ==
=== 1970s compilation albums ===
List of 1970s compilation albums, with selected chart positions and certifications
Title	Album details	Peak chart positions					Certifications
Title	Album details	UK	AUS	NZ	SWE	US	Certifications
The World of David Bowie (Note: The World of David Bowie was released as Disco de Ouro in Brazil and Bowie in Japan.)	Released: March 1970; Label: Decca; Formats: LP, MC, 8-track	—	—	—	—	—	
Images 1966–1967 (Note: Images 1966–1967 was released as David Bowie Mille-Pattes Series in France, David Bowie in Belgium and Argentina, 20 Bowie Classics in Australia, and reissued in France as Collection Blanche in 1978.)	Released: February 1973; Label: Deram; Formats: 2×LP, MC, 8-track	—	—	—	—	144	
Changesonebowie	Released: 21 May 1976; Label: RCA; Formats: LP, MC, 8-track	2	8	8	14	10	MC: 2× Platinum; RIAA: Platinum
Chameleon	Released: September 1979; Label: Stavcall; Formats: LP, MC; Not released in the UK	—	22	1	—	—	
"—" denotes items which were not released in that country or failed to chart.

=== 1980s compilation albums ===
List of 1980s compilation albums, with selected chart positions and certifications
Title	Album details	Peak chart positions								Certifications
Title	Album details	UK	AUS	AUT	NL	NOR	NZ	SWE	US	Certifications
The Best of Bowie	Released: 19 December 1980; Label: K-tel; Formats: LP, MC	3	32	12	4	21	11	25	—	BPI: Platinum
Changestwobowie	Released: 16 November 1981; Label: RCA; Formats: LP, MC, 8-track	24	53	—	—	—	28	35	68	BPI: Gold
Bowie Rare	Released: December 1982; Label: RCA; Formats: LP, MC	34	47	—	27	11	10	5	—	
Golden Years	Released: August 1983; Label: RCA; Formats: LP, MC	33	25	—	—	—	17	33	99	
Love You till Tuesday	Released: May 1984; Label: Deram; Formats: LP, MC	53	—	—	—	—	—	—	—	
Fame and Fashion	Released: May 1984; Label: RCA; Formats: LP, MC, CD	40	19	—	—	—	—	—	147	
David Bowie: The Collection	Released: November 1985; Label: Castle Communications; Formats: 2×LP, MC	—	—	—	—	—	—	—	—	BPI: Silver
"—" denotes items which were not released in that country or failed to chart.

=== 1990s compilation albums ===
List of 1990s compilation albums, with selected chart positions and certifications
Title	Album details	Peak chart positions										Sales	Certifications
Title	Album details	UK	AUS	AUT	GER	NL	NOR	NZ	SWE	SWI	US	Sales	Certifications
Changesbowie	Released: 12 March 1990; Label: EMI; Formats: 2×LP, MC, CD	1	6	5	7	6	16	2	14	18	39		ARIA: Platinum; BPI: Platinum; BVMI: Gold; IFPI AUT: Gold; MC: Gold; NVPI: Gold; RIAA: Platinum
Early On (1964–1966)	Released: 1991; Label: Rhino; Formats: MC, CD; Not released in the UK	—	—	—	—	—	—	—	—	—	—		
The Singles Collection (UK version) / The Singles 1969–1993 (US version)	Released: 8 November 1993; Label: Rykodisc, EMI; Formats: 2×CD, 2xMC; Film: The Video Collection (released on VHS in 1993)	9	49	37	64	5	—	4	38	—	—		BPI: Platinum; MC: Gold; NVPI: Platinum
Rarestonebowie	Released: May 1995; Label: Trident Music International, Golden Years; Formats: CD, LP	111	—	—	—	—	—	—	—	—	—		
The Deram Anthology 1966–1968	Released: 9 June 1997; Label: Deram; Formats: CD	—	—	—	—	—	—	—	—	—	—		
The Best of David Bowie 1969/1974	Released: 7 October 1997; Label: EMI; Formats: CD, MC	11	14	—	—	81	—	14	—	58	—		BPI: Platinum
The Best of David Bowie 1974/1979	Released: 20 April 1998; Label: EMI; Formats: CD, MC	39	49	—	—	—	—	38	—	—	—		BPI: Gold; RMNZ: Platinum
"—" denotes items which were not released in that country or failed to chart.

=== 2000s compilation albums ===
List of 2000s compilation albums, with selected chart positions and certifications
Title	Album details	Peak chart positions										Sales	Certifications
Title	Album details	UK	AUS	AUT	GER	NL	NOR	NZ	SWE	SWI	US	Sales	Certifications
All Saints	Released: 9 July 2001; Label: EMI; Formats: CD	109	—	—	—	—	—	—	—	—	—		
Best of Bowie	Released: 22 October 2002; Label: EMI; Formats: CD, 2×CD, MC; Film: Best of Bowie (released on 2×DVD in 2002)	1	6	12	16	19	10	6	9	15	4	UK: 1,128,341; US: 1,100,000	ARIA: 2× Platinum; BPI: 4× Platinum; IFPI: 2× Platinum; MC: Gold; RIAA: Platinum; RMNZ: 3× Platinum
Club Bowie	Released: 2 December 2003; Label: Virgin; Formats: CD	—	—	—	—	—	—	—	—	—	—		
The Collection	Released: 3 May 2005; Label: EMI; Formats: CD	—	—	—	—	—	—	—	—	—	—		
The Best of David Bowie 1980/1987	Released: 19 March 2007; Label: EMI; Formats: CD+DVD	34	30	44	—	98	—	16	—	—	—		
iSelect	Released: 29 June 2008; Label: EMI; Formats: CD	—	—	—	—	—	—	—	—	—	—		
"—" denotes items which were not released in that country or failed to chart.

=== 2010s compilation albums ===
List of 2010s compilation albums, with selected chart positions and certifications
Title	Album details	Peak chart positions								Certifications
Title	Album details	UK	AUS	AUT	GER	NL	NZ	SWI	US	Certifications
Nothing Has Changed	Released: 18 November 2014; Label: Columbia, Parlophone; Formats: 3×CD, 2×CD, 2×LP, DD	5	3	4	4	6	1	5	57	BPI: Gold; ARIA: Platinum; RMNZ: Platinum
Posthumous
Legacy (The Very Best of David Bowie)	Released: 11 November 2016; Label: Parlophone, Sony; Formats: 2×CD, DD	5	31	—	59	68	—	—	78	BPI: 4× Platinum
"—" denotes items which were not released in that country or failed to chart.

=== 2020s compilation albums ===
List of 2010s compilation albums, with selected chart positions and certifications
Title	Album details	Peak chart positions								Certifications
Title	Album details	UK	AUS	AUT	GER	NL	NZ	SWI	US	Certifications
The Shel Talmy Recordings	Released: 18 September 2026; Label: Parlophone/Warner; Formats: CD, LP, DD	–	–	–	–	–	–	–	–	

== Box sets ==
=== David Bowie "Era" box set series ===
List of box sets, with selected chart positions and certifications
Title	Album details	Peak chart positions					Certifications
Title	Album details	UK	AUT	GER	NL	US	Certifications
Five Years (1969–1973)	Released: 25 September 2015; Label: Parlophone; Formats: 12×CD, 13×LP, DD	45	—	63	68	—	
Who Can I Be Now? (1974–1976)	Released: 23 September 2016; Label: Parlophone; Formats: 12×CD, 13×LP, DD	21	75	28	80	192	
A New Career in a New Town (1977–1982)	Released: 29 September 2017; Label: Parlophone; Formats: 11×CD, 13×LP, DD	19	59	24	76	151	
Loving the Alien (1983–1988)	Released: 12 October 2018; Label: Parlophone; Formats: 11×CD, 15×LP, DD	19	48	18	—	—	
Brilliant Adventure (1992–2001)	Released: 26 November 2021; Label: Parlophone/ISO; Formats: 11×CD, 18×LP, DD	24	35	23	58	—	
I Can't Give Everything Away (2002–2016)	Released: 12 September 2025; Label: Parlophone/ISO; Formats: 13×CD, 18×LP, DD	49	–	6	39	—	

=== Other box sets ===
List of box sets, with selected chart positions and certifications
Title	Album details	Peak chart positions							Certifications
Title	Album details	UK	AUS	GER	NL	NZ	SWE	US	Certifications
Fashions	Released: November 1982; Label: RCA; Formats: 10x7-inch	—	—	—	—	—	—	—	
Sound + Vision	Released: 19 September 1989; Label: Rykodisc; Formats: 6×LP, 3×MC, 3×CD, 3×CD+VCD, 4×CD	63 (Note: UK chart position for Sound + Vision is for the 2014 reissue.)	72	—	—	9	—	97	BPI: Platinum; MC: 4× Platinum; RIAA: Gold
The Platinum Collection	Released: 7 November 2005; Label: EMI; Formats: 3×CD	53	—	—	25	—	26	65	BPI: Gold
David Bowie	Released: June 2007; Label: Sony Music/Columbia Records; Formats: 10×CD	—	—	—	—	—	—	—	
Zeit! 77–79	Released: 6 May 2013; Label: EMI; Formats: 5×CD	—	—	—	—	—	—	—	
Spying Through a Keyhole	Released: 5 April 2019; Label: Parlophone; Formats: 4×7″, DD	55	—	—	—	—	—	—	
Clareville Grove Demos	Released: 17 May 2019; Label: Parlophone; Formats: 3×7″, DD	—	—	—	—	—	—	—	
The 'Mercury' Demos	Released: 28 June 2019; Label: Parlophone; Formats: LP+Photos+Notes, DD	—	—	—	—	—	—	—	
Conversation Piece	Released: 15 November 2019; Label: Parlophone; Formats: 5×CD, DD	—	—	—	127 (Note: Conversation Piece did not chart in the Netherlands, but did in Wallonia.)	—	—	—	
The Width of a Circle	Released: 28 May 2021; Label: Parlophone; Formats: 2×CD	15	—	—	—	—	—	—	
Brilliant Live Adventures	Released: 30 October 2020 – 2 April 2021; Label: Parlophone; Formats: DD, streaming, CD, LP	—	—	—	—	—	—	—	
Toy:Box	Released: 7 January 2022; Label: Parlophone; Formats: DD, streaming, 3×CD, 6×LP	—	—	—	—	—	—	—	
Divine Symmetry: An Alternative Journey Through Hunky Dory	Released: 25 November 2022; Label: Parlophone; Formats: streaming, 4×CD, Blu-ray	—	—	—	—	—	—	—	
Rock 'n' Roll Star!	Released: 14 June 2024; Label: Parlophone; Formats: streaming, 5×CD, Blu-ray	39	—	51	44	—	—	—	
"—" denotes items which were not released in that country or failed to chart.

== Extended plays ==
List of EPs, with selected chart positions
Title	EP details	Peak chart positions		
Title	EP details	UK Singles	UK Albums	US Billboard 200
Don't Be Fooled By the Name (Note: Don't Be Fooled By the Name was released as London Boys in Spain and Early Bowie in Italy; reissued as David Bowie in Spain in 1985; and reissued in the UK as Rare Tracks in 1986, 1966 in 1987, Introspective in 1990 and I Dig Everything: The 1966 Pye Singles in 1999. In 2015 it was reissued as 1966 for Record Store Day 2015, when it entered the charts in UK.)	Released: September 1981; Label: Pye, Showcase, Tabak; Formats: 10″, 12″, 3×7″, 3×10″	157	—	—
David Bowie in Bertolt Brecht's Baal	Released: 13 February 1982; Label: RCA; Formats: 7″, 12″; Film: Baal (released in 1982)	29	—	—
The Mannish Boys/Davy Jones and the Lower Third	Released: October 1982; Label: See For Miles; Formats: 10″	—	—	—
BBC Sessions 1969–1972	Released: July 1996; Label: NMC Music; Formats: CD	—	—	—
Earthling in the City	Released: November 1997; Label: GQ (Magazine); Formats: Promo CD	—	—	—
Live EP (Live at Fashion Rocks) (with Arcade Fire)	Released: November 2005; Formats: DD	—	—	—
Space Oddity	Released: 20 July 2009; Label: EMI; Formats: DD	—	—	—
The Next Day Extra	Released: 4 November 2013; Label: ISO/Columbia; Formats: DD	—	89	—
Posthumous
No Plan	Released: 8 January 2017; Label: Columbia; Formats: LP, CD, DD	92	—	131
Is It Any Wonder?	Released: 14 February 2020 (digital) 20 March 2020 (physical); Label: Parlophone; Formats: LP, CD, DD	—	10	—
Brilliant Adventure E.P.	Released: 23 April 2022 (physical); Label: Parlophone; Formats: LP, CD (Record Store Day ltd. ed.)	—	—	—
Toy E.P. (You've Got It Made with All the Toys)	Released: 23 April 2022 (physical); Label: Parlophone; Formats: LP, CD (Record Store Day ltd. ed.)	—	—	—
"—" denotes items which were not released in that country or failed to chart.

== Singles ==
=== 1960s singles ===
List of 1960s singles, with selected chart positions and certifications
Title	Year	Peak chart positions					Sales	Certifications	Album
Title	Year	UK	AUS	IRE	NL	US	Sales	Certifications	Album
"Liza Jane" (as Davie Jones with the King Bees)	1964	—	x	x	x	x			Non-album singles
"I Pity the Fool" (with the Manish Boys)	1965	—	x	x	x	x			Non-album singles
"You've Got a Habit of Leaving" (as Davy Jones with the Lower Third)	1965	—	x	x	x	x			Non-album singles
"Can't Help Thinking About Me" (as David Bowie with the Lower Third)	1966	—	x	x	x	—			Non-album singles
"Do Anything You Say"	1966	—	x	x	x	x			Non-album singles
"I Dig Everything"	1966	—	x	x	x	x			Non-album singles
"Rubber Band" (Note: "Rubber Band" was issued in the US in June 1967. However, the A-side featured the album version of the track rather than the non-album track of the UK version.)	1966	—	x	x	x	—			Non-album singles
"The Laughing Gnome"	1967	— (Note: "The Laughing Gnome" was originally released in the UK in 1967 but did not enter the Official UK Singles Chart Top 100. It was unofficially re-released in 1973, peaking at No. 6.)	— (Note: "The Laughing Gnome" was originally released in Australia in 1967 but did not enter the ARIA Top 50. It was unofficially re-released in 1973, peaking at No. 57.)	— (Note: "The Laughing Gnome" was originally released in Ireland in 1967 but did not enter the Official Irish Singles Chart Top 50. It was unofficially re-released in 1973, peaking at No. 5.)	x	x		BPI: Silver	Non-album singles
"Love You till Tuesday"	1967	—	—	x	—	—			Non-album singles
"Space Oddity"	1969	5 (Note: "Space Oddity" was originally released in the UK in 1969, reaching No. 5 on the UK singles chart. It was re-released worldwide in 1975, reaching No. 1 in the UK.)	– (Note: "Space Oddity" was re-released in 1973, reaching No. 9 in Australia.)	13 (Note: "Space Oddity" was re-released worldwide in 1975, reaching a higher chart position of No. 3 in Ireland.)	– (Note: "Space Oddity" was re-released worldwide in 1975, reaching No. 4 in the Netherlands.)	124 (Note: "Space Oddity" was originally released in the US in 1969 but did not enter the Billboard Hot 100, peaking at No. 124 on the Bubbling Under the Hot 100 chart.It was re-released for the first time in the US in 1973, peaking at No. 15.)	UK: 680,825; US: 191,637 (digital)	BPI: Platinum	David Bowie (1969)
"—" denotes releases that did not chart. "x" denotes single not released in that territory.

=== 1970s singles ===
List of 1970s singles, with selected chart positions and certifications
Title	Year	Peak chart positions							Sales	Certifications	Album
Title	Year	UK	AUS	AUT	GER	IRE	NL	US	Sales	Certifications	Album
"The Prettiest Star"	1970	—	x	x	—	x	—	x			Non-album singles
"Memory of a Free Festival Part 1"	1970	—	x	x	—	x	x	x			Non-album singles
"Holy Holy"	1971	—	—	x	—	x	x	x			Non-album singles
"Changes"	1972	— (Note: "Changes" did not chart in 1972 in UK, but following Bowie's death in 2016 the song entered these charts peaking at No. 49.)	— (Note: "Changes" did not chart in 1972 in Australia, but following Bowie's death in 2016 the song entered these charts peaking at No. 80.)	—	—	—	—	66 (Note: "Changes" was released in the US in December 1971. While the single peaked at No. 66 in 1972, it re-entered the chart in 1974, peaking at No. 41.)	US: 83,254	BPI: Platinum	Hunky Dory
"Starman"	1972	10	37	55	—	17	—	65		BPI: 2× Platinum	Ziggy Stardust
"John, I'm Only Dancing"	1972	12	—	x	—	19	—	x			Non-album single
"The Jean Genie"	1972	2	42	—	37	3	5	71	UK: 336,653	BPI: Silver	Aladdin Sane
"Drive-In Saturday"	1973	3	x	x	—	4	—	x			Aladdin Sane
"Time"	1973	-	x	x	x	x	x	—			Aladdin Sane
"Life on Mars?"	1973	3	67	—	39	4	95	x	UK: 482,453	BPI: Platinum	Hunky Dory
"Let's Spend the Night Together"	1973	x	—	—	—	—	19	109			Aladdin Sane
"Sorrow"	1973	3	1	—	39	2	29	—		BPI: Silver	Pin Ups
"Rebel Rebel"	1974	5	28	—	33	2	8	64	US: 50,279	BPI: Platinum	Diamond Dogs
"Rock 'n' Roll Suicide"	1974	22	x	x	—	12	x	x			Ziggy Stardust
"Diamond Dogs"	1974	21	66	—	—	27	x	x			Diamond Dogs
"1984"	1974	x	x	x	x	x	x	—			Diamond Dogs
"Knock on Wood" (live)	1974	10	49	—	—	4	—	x			David Live
"Rock 'n' Roll with Me" (live)	1974	x	x	x	x	x	x				David Live
"Young Americans"	1975	18	27	—	—	13	—	28		BPI: Silver	Young Americans
"Fame"	1975	17	—	—	—	—	6	1		RIAA: Gold	Young Americans
"Golden Years"	1975	8	34	—	—	9	6	10		BPI: Silver	Station to Station
"TVC 15"	1976	33	—	—	—	—	—	64			Station to Station
"Suffragette City"	1976	—	—	x	—	x	x	x		BPI: Silver	Changesonebowie (Note: "Suffragette City" was originally from the 1972 album Ziggy Stardust, but was not released as a single until 1976 to promote the album Changesonebowie.)
"Stay"	1976	x	x	x	x	x	x	—			Station to Station
"Sound and Vision"	1977	3	74	15	6	—	2	69	UK: 355,513	BPI: Gold	Low
"Be My Wife"	1977	57 (Note: Chart position is from the official UK "Breakers List".)	—	—	—	—	—	—			Low
"'Heroes'" (Note: "'Heroes'" was also recorded in German and French language versions. The single version worldwide was an edited cut of the album version, but was released in Germany and France in two formats: in the original English and in the respective languages. In Germany, the German-language version appeared as a single titled "'Heroes'"; while in France, the French-language version was still titled "'Heroes'" but had 'Chanté en Français' on the cover.)	1977	24	11	14	19	8	9	—		BPI: 2× Platinum	"Heroes"
"Beauty and the Beast"	1978	39	—	—	—	—	—	—			"Heroes"
"Breaking Glass" (live)	1978	54	x	x	x	x	—	x			Stage
"Boys Keep Swinging"	1979	7	85	—	—	19	16	x			Lodger
"D.J."	1979	29	98	—	—	—	x	106			Lodger
"Yassassin"	1979	x	x	x	x	x	—	x			Lodger
"Look Back in Anger"	1979	x	x	x	x	x	x	—			Lodger
"John, I'm Only Dancing (Again)"	1979	12	—	—	—	29	—	—			Non-album single
"—" denotes releases that did not chart. "x" denotes single not released in that territory.

==== 1970s promotional singles ====
List of 1970s promotional singles
Title	Year	Album
"All the Madmen"	1971	The Man Who Sold the World

=== 1980s singles ===
List of 1980s singles, with selected chart positions and certifications
Title	Year	Peak chart positions								Sales	Certifications	Album
Title	Year	UK	AUS	AUT	GER	IRE	NL	US	US Main. Rock	Sales	Certifications	Album
"Alabama Song"	1980	23	—	—	—	—	—	x	x			Non-album singles
"Crystal Japan" (Note: "Crystal Japan" was a Japanese-only single.)	1980	x	x	x	x	x	x	x	x			Non-album singles
"Ashes to Ashes"	1980	1	3	6	9	4	15	— (Note: "Ashes to Ashes" did not enter the Billboard Hot 100 but peaked at No. 101 on the Bubbling Under Hot 100 chart.)	—	UK: 679,703	BPI: Gold	Scary Monsters
"Fashion"	1980	5	27	—	34	11	—	70	—		BPI: Silver	Scary Monsters
"It's No Game (Part 1)" (Note: "It's No Game (Part 1)" was a Japanese-only single.)	1980	x	x	x	x	x	x	x	x			Scary Monsters
"Scary Monsters (And Super Creeps)"	1981	20	—	—	—	17	—	x	x			Scary Monsters
"Up the Hill Backwards"	1981	32	x	x	—	x	x	—	—			Scary Monsters
"Under Pressure" (with Queen)	1981	1	6	10	21	2	1	29	7	UK: 764,140; US: 996,565	BPI: 3× Platinum; ARIA: 3× Platinum; RIAA: 4× Platinum	Hot Space
"Wild Is the Wind"	1981	24	—	—	—	15	x	x	x			Changestwobowie
"Cat People (Putting Out Fire)" (with Giorgio Moroder)	1982	26	15	—	—	17	—	67	9			Cat People: Original Soundtrack
"Peace on Earth/Little Drummer Boy" (with Bing Crosby)	1982	3	—	53	—	6	—	—	—	UK: 445,424	BPI: Silver	Non-album single
"Let's Dance"	1983	1	2	2	2	1	1	1	8	UK: 1,064,227; US: 96,340 (digital)	BPI: 2x Platinum; RIAA: Gold	Let's Dance
"China Girl"	1983	2	15	9	6	2	5	10	3	UK: 504,424	BPI: Silver	Let's Dance
"Modern Love"	1983	2	6	—	27	3	10	14	6	UK: 522,989	BPI: Platinum	Let's Dance
"White Light/White Heat" (live)	1983	46	x	—	—	—	—	—	—			Ziggy Stardust: The Motion Picture
"Without You"	1983	x	—	x	x	—	—	73	—			Let's Dance
"Blue Jean"	1984	6	12	16	21	3	10	8	2			Tonight
"Tonight" (with Tina Turner – uncredited)	1984	53	70	22	—	24	45	53	32		NVPI: Gold	Tonight
"This Is Not America" (with Pat Metheny Group)	1985	14	33	5	5	9	2	32	7			The Falcon and the Snowman: Original Motion Picture Soundtrack
"Loving the Alien"	1985	19	65	—	27	5	25	—	—			Tonight
"Dancing in the Street" (Clearmountain mix) (with Mick Jagger)	1985	1	1	6	6	1	1	7	—	UK: 725,155	BPI: Gold	Non-album single
"Absolute Beginners"	1986	2	5	2	7	1	8	53	9	UK: 309,241	BPI: Silver	Absolute Beginners: The Original Motion Picture Soundtrack
"Underground"	1986	21	26	—	20	6	7	—	18			Labyrinth: Original Motion Picture Soundtrack
"When the Wind Blows"	1986	44	—	—	—	19	50	—	—			When the Wind Blows: Original Motion Picture Soundtrack
"Magic Dance"	1987	x	—	x	x	x	x	—	—		BPI: Silver	Labyrinth soundtrack
"Day-In Day-Out"	1987	17	33	25	25	12	15	21	3			Never Let Me Down
"Time Will Crawl"	1987	33	—	—	57	18	71	—	7			Never Let Me Down
"Never Let Me Down"	1987	34	63	—	—	26	70	27	15			Never Let Me Down
"Tonight" (live) (with Tina Turner)	1988	—	—	—	39	—	1	—	—			Tina Live in Europe
"—" denotes releases that did not chart. "x" denotes single not released in that territory.

=== 1990s singles ===
List of 1990s singles, with selected chart positions
Title	Year	Peak chart positions										Album
Title	Year	UK	AUS	AUT	GER	IRE	NL	NOR	SWE	SWI	US	Album
"Fame '90"	1990	28	85	—	36	11	16	—	—	29	—	Non-album single
"Real Cool World"	1992	53	131	—	83	—	27	—	26	—	—	Songs from the Cool World
"Jump They Say"	1993	9	53	—	43	12	24	7	23	40	—	Black Tie White Noise
"Black Tie White Noise" (with Al B. Sure!)	1993	36	74	—	—	—	—	—	—	—	—	Black Tie White Noise
"Miracle Goodnight"	1993	40	—	—	—	—	—	—	—	—	—	Black Tie White Noise
"The Buddha of Suburbia" (with Lenny Kravitz)	1993	35	—	—	—	—	—	—	—	—	—	The Buddha of Suburbia
"Ziggy Stardust" (live)	1994	76	—	—	—	—	—	—	86	—	—	Non-album single
"The Hearts Filthy Lesson"	1995	35	—	—	—	—	—	—	34	—	92	Outside
"Strangers When We Meet" / "The Man Who Sold the World" (live)	1995	39	—	—	—	—	—	—	56	—	—	Outside
"Hallo Spaceboy" (with Pet Shop Boys)	1996	12	36	37	59	21	33	—	12	—	—	Outside
"Telling Lies"	1996	76	—	—	—	—	—	—	53	—	—	Earthling
"Little Wonder"	1997	14	94	—	—	27	50	—	—	—	—	Earthling
"Dead Man Walking"	1997	32	120	—	—	—	—	—	—	—	—	Earthling
"Seven Years in Tibet"	1997	61	—	—	—	—	—	—	—	—	—	Earthling
"Pallas Athena" (as Tao Jones Index)	1997	—	—	—	—	—	—	—	—	—	—	Non-album single
"I'm Afraid of Americans"	1997	—	—	—	—	—	—	—	—	—	66	Earthling
"Perfect Day" (with various artists for Children in Need)	1997	1	—	24	54	1	6	1	31	37	—	Non-album single
"I Can't Read"	1997	73	—	—	—	—	—	—	—	—	—	The Ice Storm
"Without You I'm Nothing" (with Placebo)	1999	—	52	—	—	—	—	—	—	—	—	Without You I'm Nothing
"Thursday's Child"	1999	16	—	—	62	—	81	—	48	—	—	Hours
"The Pretty Things Are Going to Hell"	1999	—	—	—	—	—	—	—	—	—	—	Hours
"Under Pressure (Rah Mix)" (with Queen)	1999	14	—	—	—	—	21	—	—	—	—	Greatest Hits III
"—" denotes releases that did not chart.

=== 2000s singles ===
List of 2000s singles, with selected chart positions
Title	Year	Peak chart positions					Album
Title	Year	UK	AUT	GER	NL	SWI	Album
"Survive"	2000	28	—	—	—	—	Hours
"Seven"	2000	32	—	—	97	—	Hours
"Slow Burn"	2002	94	69	—	69	80	Heathen
"Everyone Says 'Hi'"	2002	20	—	83	—	—	Heathen
"I've Been Waiting for You"	2002	—	—	—	—	—	Heathen
"New Killer Star"	2003	—	—	—	—	—	Reality
"Never Get Old"	2004	—	—	—	—	—	Reality
"Rebel Never Gets Old"	2004	47	—	—	—	—	Non-album singles
"Arnold Layne" (with David Gilmour)	2006	19	—	—	—	—	Non-album singles
"—" denotes releases that did not chart.

=== 2010s singles ===
List of 2010s and 2020s singles, with selected chart positions and certifications
Title	Year	Peak chart positions										Album
Title	Year	UK	AUS	AUT	CAN	FRA	GER	IRE	NL	SWI	US	Album
"Where Are We Now?"	2013	6	78	40	59	9	47	9	7	52	— (Note: "Where Are We Now?" did not enter the Billboard Hot 100, but peaked at number 16 on the Bubbling Under Hot 100 Singles chart.)	The Next Day
"The Stars (Are Out Tonight)"	2013	102	—	—	—	—	—	89	88	—	—	The Next Day
"The Next Day"	2013	179	—	—	—	—	—	—	—	—	—	The Next Day
"Valentine's Day"	2013	179	—	—	—	—	—	—	—	—	—	The Next Day
"Love Is Lost" (Hello Steve Reich mix by James Murphy for the DFA)	2013	192	—	—	—	—	—	—	—	—	—	The Next Day Extra
"Sound and Vision 2013"	2013	148	—	—	—	—	—	—	—	—	—	Non-album singles
"'Tis a Pity She Was a Whore"	2014	107	—	—	—	—	—	—	68	—	—	Non-album singles
"Sue (Or in a Season of Crime)"	2014	81	—	—	—	52	—	—	83	54	—	Nothing Has Changed
"Kingdom Come" (Note: "Kingdom Come" was released as a Double-A side single, with Tom Verlaine's version on one side and Bowie's on the other, released for Record Store Day.)	2015	—	—	—	—	—	—	—	—	—	—	Scary Monsters (and Super Creeps)
"★ (Blackstar)"	2015	61	—	69	53	45	97	62	44	20	78	Blackstar
"Lazarus"	2015	45	72	38	14	35	77	48	32	16	40	Blackstar
Posthumous
"I Can't Give Everything Away"	2016	141	—	—	—	142	—	—	—	45	—	Blackstar
"Life on Mars?" (2016 Mix)	2016	—	—	—	—	—	—	—	—	—	—	Legacy
"No Plan"	2017	92	—	—	—	58	—	—	—	—	—	Lazarus / No Plan
"Let's Dance" (demo)	2018	—	—	—	—	—	—	—	—	—	—	Non-album single
"Under Pressure" (with Queen)	2018	—	—	—	—	143	—	—	—	—	—	Bohemian Rhapsody: The Original Soundtrack
"—" denotes releases that did not chart.

=== 2020s singles ===
Title	Year	Album
"Cosmic Dancer" (live; with Morrissey)	2020	Non-album singles
"Tryin' to Get to Heaven" / "Mother"	2021	Non-album singles

=== Singles as a member of Tin Machine ===
List of singles, with selected chart positions
Title	Year	Peak chart positions				Album
Title	Year	UK	IRE	US Main. Rock	US Mod. Rock	Album
"Heaven's in Here" (promo only)	1989	—	—	—	—	Tin Machine
"Under the God"	1989	51	23	8	—	Tin Machine
Tin Machine / Maggie's Farm (live)	1989	48	x	x	x	Tin Machine
"Prisoner of Love"	1989	77	—	—	—	Tin Machine
"You Belong in Rock 'n' Roll"	1991	33	—	—	—	Tin Machine II
"Baby Universal"	1991	48	—	—	21	Tin Machine II
"One Shot"	1991	—	—	—	3	Tin Machine II
"—" denotes releases that did not chart. "x" denotes single not released in that territory.

== Other appearances ==
=== Studio contributions ===
Title	Year	Album	Notes	Ref.
"Revolutionary Song"	1979	Just a Gigolo soundtrack	as a part of the Rebels	
"Absolute Beginners", "That's Motivation", "Volare"	1986	Absolute Beginners soundtrack		
"When the Wind Blows"	1986	When the Wind Blows soundtrack		
"Real Cool World"	1992	Songs from the Cool World		
"Needles on the Beach"	1994	Beyond the Beach	as a part of Tin Machine	
"Planet of Dreams"	1997	Long Live Tibet	with Gail Ann Dorsey	
"I Can't Read"	1997	The Ice Storm soundtrack	David Bowie solo version	
"A Foggy Day (In London Town)"	1998	Red Hot + Rhapsody: The Gershwin Groove	with Angelo Badalamenti	
"Nature Boy"	2001	Moulin Rouge! Music from Baz Luhrmann's Film	David Bowie and Massive Attack	
"Pictures of Lily"	2001	Substitute: The Songs of The Who	The Who cover	
"Your Turn to Drive"	2003	N/A	digital download	
"Changes"	2004	Shrek 2: Motion Picture Soundtrack	Butterfly Boucher featuring David Bowie	
"(She Can) Do That"	2005	Stealth soundtrack	David Bowie and BT	
"American Landfill"	2020	Kate's Not Here: the Turning soundtrack	Kristeen Young featuring David Bowie	

=== Live contributions ===
Title	Year	Album	Notes	Ref.
"Go Now"	1992	Ruby Trax	as a part of Tin Machine	
"Baby Can Dance"	1993	Best of Grunge Rock	Live version recorded by Tin Machine in Hamburg on 24 October 1991	
"Hallo Spaceboy"	1997	Phoenix: The Album	Recorded live at the Phoenix Festival on 18 July 1996	
"Dead Man Walking"	1997	Live from 6A: Late Night with Conan O'Brien	Live version performed on Late Night with Conan O'Brien	
"'Heroes'"	1997	The Bridge School Concerts Vol. 1	A live version recorded for the Bridge School Benefit in Mountain View, California	
"Dead Man Walking"	1998	99X Live X IV "Home"	Live version recorded at Smith's Olde Bar in Atlanta in April 1997. Bowie also designed the CD cover.	
"Dead Man Walking"	1998	WBCN Naked Too (A Companion Collection of Unreleased Performances)	Live version recorded at Fort Apache Studios in Boston in April 1997	
"Scary Monsters (And Super Creeps)"	1999	SNL^{25} Saturday Night Live: The Musical Performances Volume 1	Live version performed on 8 February 1997 episode of Saturday Night Live	
"China Girl"	2000	VH1 Storytellers	Live version recorded for VH1's Storytellers	
"America", "'Heroes'"	2001	The Concert for New York City	Recorded live at The Concert for New York City on 20 October 2001	
"Scary Monsters (And Super Creeps)"	2005	ONXRT: Live from the Archives Volume 8		

=== Guest appearances ===
Title	Year	Artist	Notes	Ref.
All the Young Dudes	1972	Mott the Hoople	Producer, saxophone, writer ("All the Young Dudes")	
Transformer	1972	Lou Reed	Co-producer, backing vocals, acoustic guitar	
Raw Power	1973	Iggy & the Stooges	Co-producer with Iggy Pop, Mixing	
"The Man Who Sold the World"	1974	Lulu	Co-producer, saxophone, backing vocals	
Now We Are Six	1974	Steeleye Span	Saxophone ("To Know Him Is to Love Him")	
Slaughter on 10th Avenue	1974	Mick Ronson	Co-writer ("Growing Up and I'm Fine", "Music Is Lethal", "Hey Ma Get Papa")	
Weren't Born a Man	1974	Dana Gillespie	Co-producer ("Andy Warhol", "Backed a Loser", "Mother, Don't Be Frightened")	
The Idiot	1977	Iggy Pop	Producer, co-writer, backing vocals, guitar, synthesizer, keyboards, saxophone, drum machine	
Lust for Life	1977	Iggy Pop	Co-producer, piano, organ, keyboards, backing vocals, co-writer ("Lust for Life", "Some Weird Sin", "Tonight", "Success", "Turn Blue", "Neighborhood Threat", "Fall in Love with Me")	
TV Eye Live 1977	1978	Iggy Pop	Co-producer, mixing, piano ("T.V. Eye", "Funtime", "Dirt", "I Wanna Be Your Dog"), co-writer ("Funtime", "Lust for Life", "Nightclubbing")	
David Bowie Narrates Prokofiev's Peter and the Wolf	1978	Eugene Ormandy / Philadelphia Orchestra	Narrator	
Soldier	1980	Iggy Pop	Co-writer & additional vocals ("Play It Safe")	
Cat People	1982	Giorgio Moroder	Guest vocals on "The Myth"	
Hot Space	1982	Queen	Co-wrote and sang on "Under Pressure"	
Cool Cat	1982	Queen	Background vocals on Cool Cat (David requested his vocals to be removed before album was finalised)	
Blah-Blah-Blah	1986	Iggy Pop	Co-producer, mixing, co-writer ("Baby, It Can't Fall", "Shades", "Isolation", "Blah-Blah-Blah", "Hideaway", "Little Miss Emperor")	
Tina Live in Europe	1988	Tina Turner	Guest vocals ("Tonight", "Let's Dance")	
Young Lions	1990	Adrian Belew	Guest vocals ("Pretty Pink Rose", "Gunman"), writer ("Pretty Pink Rose"), co-writer ("Gunman")	
Heaven and Hull	1994	Mick Ronson	Guest vocals ("Like a Rolling Stone")	
The Sacred Squall of Now	1995	Reeves Gabrels	Vocals and guitar ("You've Been Around", "The King of Stamford Hill")	
People From Bad Homes	1995	Ava Cherry & the Astronettes	Producer, backing vocals, writer ("I Am Divine", "I Am Laser", "People from Bad Homes", "Things to Do")	
Another Crazy Cocktail Party	1997	Various artists	Co-writer ("Pancho")	
Saturnzreturn	1998	Goldie	Guest vocals ("Truth")	
All the Young Dudes (box set)	1998	Mott the Hoople	Demo vocals ("All the Young Dudes")	
All the Way from Stockholm to Philadelphia: Live 71/72	1998	Mott the Hoople	Guest vocals ("All the Young Dudes")	
Without You I'm Nothing	1999	Placebo	Guest vocals ("Without You I'm Nothing")	
Ulysses (Della Notte)	1999	Reeves Gabrels	Guest vocals ("Jewel")	
¡Viva Nueva!	2001	Rustic Overtones	Guest vocals ("Sector Z", "Man Without a Mouth")	
Training Day	2001	P. Diddy & The Bad Boy Family	Guest vocals ("American Dream")	
The Raven	2003	Lou Reed	Guest vocals ("Hop Frog")	
Breasticles	2003	Kristeen Young	Guest vocals ("Saviour")	
Zig Zag	2003	Earl Slick	Guest vocals and co-writer ("Isn't It Evening (The Revolutionary)")	
No Balance Palace	2005	Kashmir	Guest vocals ("The Cynic")	
Return to Cookie Mountain	2006	TV on the Radio	Backing vocals ("Province")	
Anywhere I Lay My Head	2008	Scarlett Johansson	Backing vocals ("Falling Down", "Fannin Street")	
Reflektor	2013	Arcade Fire	Backing vocals ("Reflektor")	

=== Remixes and alternate versions ===
Title	Year	Album	Notes	Ref.
"The Supermen"	1972	Glastonbury Fayre	alternate version	
"Cat People (Putting Out Fire)"	1982	Cat People	re-recorded for Let's Dance	
"I'm Afraid of Americans"	1995	Showgirls	early mix	
"A Small Plot of Land"	1996	Basqiat	alternate mix	
"I'm Deranged", "I'm Deranged (Reprise)"	1997	Lost Highway	edited	
"Little Wonder"	1997	The Saint	Danny Saber Dance Mix	
"Something in the Air"	2000	American Psycho	American Psycho Remix	
"Candidate"	2001	Intimacy	remix	
"Rebel Rebel"	2003	Charlie's Angels: Full Throttle	re-recorded version	
"Bring Me the Disco King"	2003	Underworld	Danny Lohner Mix	
"All the Madmen" (Live Intro/Original LP Version)	2004	Mayor of the Sunset Strip		
"Fame"	2005	Hip Hop Roots	extended edit by Jazzy Jay	
