= The Deram Anthology 1966–1968 =

Compilation album by David Bowie
- Released: 9 June 1997
- Recorded: 1966–1969
- Genre: Pop; folk
- Length: 74:06
- Label: Deram

David Bowie chronology
| Earthling (1997) | The Deram Anthology 1966–1968 (1997) | The Best of David Bowie 1969/1974 (1997) |

David Bowie compilation chronology
| BBC Sessions 1969–1972 (Sampler) (1996) | The Deram Anthology 1966–1968 (1997) | The Best of David Bowie 1969/1974 (1997) |

Professional ratings
Review scores
| Source | Rating |
|---|---|
| Allmusic | 4/5 stars |
| The Encyclopedia of Popular Music | 2/5 stars |
| NME | 3/10 |
| Pitchfork | 5.4/10 |
| Select | 3/5 stars |
| Uncut | 3/5 stars |

The Deram Anthology 1966–1968 is a compilation album by David Bowie, released in 1997. It collects together most of the material Bowie recorded for Deram Records that has been previously released in some form, including the 1967 debut album in its entirety (tracks 5–18), in chronological order. Tracks 24–27 were mixed/recorded in 1969 after Bowie was dropped from Deram Records and were for the promotional video "Love You Till Tuesday", made to sell Bowie to a new label. Thus Deram originally had nothing to do with these tracks.

Originally this was planned to be a two-disc release featuring several previously unreleased tracks, but Bowie vetoed the inclusion of such material. Reportedly the tracks Bowie vetoed included songs called "Pussy Cat", "Back to Where You've Never Been", "Funny Smile", "Bunny Thing", a cover of The Velvet Underground's "Waiting for the Man" and German-language versions of "Love You 'Till Tuesday" and "When I Live My Dream" (the last three have been widely bootlegged). A reel to reel copy taken directly from the master tapes exists of the songs "Funny Smile", "Bunny Thing", and "Pussy Cat" and is owned by a previous employee of Decca Records who worked for the company at the time the tracks were recorded. In 2019 these recordings have been put up for auction by Omega Auctions.

== Track listing ==
All songs written by David Bowie.

| No. | Title | Original release | Length |
|---|---|---|---|
| 1. | "Rubber Band" (single version) | 1966 single | 2:05 |
| 2. | "The London Boys" | B-side of "Rubber Band" | 3:22 |
| 3. | "The Laughing Gnome" | 1967 single | 3:03 |
| 4. | "The Gospel According to Tony Day" | B-side of "The Laughing Gnome" | 2:50 |
| 5. | "Uncle Arthur" | David Bowie | 2:09 |
| 6. | "Sell Me a Coat" | David Bowie | 3:01 |
| 7. | "Rubber Band" | David Bowie | 2:19 |
| 8. | "Love You till Tuesday" | David Bowie | 3:11 |
| 9. | "There Is a Happy Land" | David Bowie | 3:14 |
| 10. | "We Are Hungry Men" | David Bowie | 2:59 |
| 11. | "When I Live My Dream" | David Bowie | 3:24 |
| 12. | "Little Bombardier" | David Bowie | 3:27 |
| 13. | "Silly Boy Blue" | David Bowie | 3:53 |
| 14. | "Come and Buy My Toys" | David Bowie | 2:10 |
| 15. | "Join the Gang" | David Bowie | 2:19 |
| 16. | "She's Got Medals" | David Bowie | 2:25 |
| 17. | "Maid of Bond Street" | David Bowie | 1:45 |
| 18. | "Please Mr. Gravedigger" | David Bowie | 2:40 |
| 19. | "Love You till Tuesday" (single version) | 1967 single | 3:01 |
| 20. | "Did You Ever Have a Dream" | B-side of "Love You till Tuesday" | 2:08 |
| 21. | "Karma Man" | The World of David Bowie | 3:05 |
| 22. | "Let Me Sleep Beside You" | The World of David Bowie | 3:27 |
| 23. | "In the Heat of the Morning" | The World of David Bowie | 2:58 |
| 24. | "Ching-A-Ling" | Love You till Tuesday | 2:04 |
| 25. | "Sell Me a Coat" (remix, stereo) | Love You till Tuesday | 2:53 |
| 26. | "When I Live My Dream" | Love You till Tuesday | 3:52 |
| 27. | "Space Oddity" (original version, Demo version recorded and edited in February 1969 for the "Love You Till Tuesday" film) | Love You till Tuesday | 3:46 |
