= Love You till Tuesday =

Love You till Tuesday may refer to:

- "Love You till Tuesday" (song), a 1967 song by David Bowie
- Love You till Tuesday (film), a promotional film about David Bowie
- Love You till Tuesday (album), a compilation of material by David Bowie
