= London Boy =

London Boy or London Boys may refer to:

- London Boys, a German-based English dance-pop duo (active 1986–1996)
- London Boy (David Bowie album) (1996)
- London Boy (mixtape), a mixtape by Chip (2012)
- "London Boy" (song), a 2019 song by Taylor Swift
- "The London Boys", a song by David Bowie (1966)
- "London Boys" (T. Rex song) (1976)
- "London Boy", a song by Lim Young-woong (2022)
- "London Boys", a song by the Johnny Thunders from So Alone (1978)
