= Love You till Tuesday (soundtrack) =

Soundtrack album by David Bowie
- Released: May 1984, 1992
- Recorded: 1966–1969
- Genre: Baroque pop, music hall, folk rock
- Label: Deram; Pickwick (1992)

David Bowie chronology
Fame and Fashion (1984)	Love You till Tuesday (1984)	Tonight (1984)

David Bowie soundtrack chronology
Christiane F. (1981)	Love You till Tuesday (1984)	Labyrinth (1986)

Professional ratings
Review scores
Source	Rating
Allmusic	3/5 stars
The Encyclopedia of Popular Music	2/5 stars

Love You till Tuesday is a compilation of 1960s material by David Bowie, issued as a companion to the belated video release of Bowie's 1969 promotional film Love You till Tuesday.

Deram, Bowie's record label from 1966 to mid-1969, released the soundtrack to the film. Due to its release when Bowie was a star, this has often been confused with his debut album. It does share some songs with the 1967 LP, but most of it was remixed in 1984. It was the first release to feature the original version of "Space Oddity", "Ching-a-Ling" and "When I'm Five", and also included previously unreleased versions of "Sell Me a Coat" and "When I Live My Dream".

In 1992, Pickwick Records reissued the compilation on CD, featuring a modified track list and a different cover. In addition to re-ordering the tracks, it also featured different versions of "Space Oddity", "Ching-a-Ling", "Love You till Tuesday", "Rubber Band" and "When I Live My Dream". The first two are longer versions (the vinyl version had the shorter "film edit" version of "Space Oddity") while the last three were replaced by the versions from the 1967 album.

== Track listing ==
Side one
No.	Title	Length
1.	"Love You till Tuesday" (single version)	2:40
2.	"The London Boys"	3:18
3.	"Ching-A-Ling"	2:02
4.	"The Laughing Gnome"	3:03
5.	"Liza Jane"	2:14
6.	"When I'm Five"	2:07

Side two
No.	Title	Length
7.	"Space Oddity"	3:45
8.	"Sell Me A Coat"	2:53
9.	"Rubber Band" (single version)	2:16
10.	"Let Me Sleep Beside You"	3:25
11.	"When I Live My Dream"	3:55

1992 CD version
No.	Title	Length
1.	"Space Oddity"	4:31
2.	"Love You till Tuesday"	3:09
3.	"When I'm Five"	3:03
4.	"Ching-A-Ling"	2:51
5.	"The Laughing Gnome"	2:55
6.	"Rubber Band"	2:18
7.	"Sell Me A Coat"	2:58
8.	"Liza Jane"	2:14
9.	"When I Live My Dream"	3:23
10.	"Let Me Sleep Beside You"	3:24
11.	"The London Boys"	3:20

== Chart performance ==
In the United Kingdom, Love You till Tuesday peaked at #53 on the UK Albums Chart during 1984.
