= Silly Boy Blue =

1967 song by David Bowie

Song by David Bowie

from the album David Bowie
- Released: 1 June 1967
- Recorded: 8–9 December 1966
- Studio: Decca, London
- Length: 3:48
- Label: Deram
- Songwriter: David Bowie
- Producer: Mike Vernon

"Silly Boy Blue" is a song written and recorded by the English singer-songwriter David Bowie. Originally demoed in 1965 as a mod-influenced track about a teenage runaway, it was revised in 1966 with new lyrics and released on Bowie's self-titled debut album in June 1967. This version reflects Bowie's fascination with Tibetan Buddhism, featuring various spiritual and geographic references in the lyrics and varied instrumentation such as a trumpet, cello and Chinese gong. Bowie remade the song twice during his stint with the Riot Squad in April 1967: as an instrumental for live performances and acoustically, which has appeared on compilations.

Bowie performed "Silly Boy Blue" during his mime productions in 1968 and during his respective BBC radio sessions in December 1967 and May 1968. The first version was similar to the album version and appeared on David Bowie: Deluxe Edition (2010), while the second boasted a new string arrangement from Tony Visconti and was included on his compilation Bowie at the Beeb (2000). Billy Fury covered the song in 1968, whereas Bowie revisited Tibetan themes in later recordings. He re-recorded the song during the sessions for the Toy project in mid-2000 and performed this version at New York's Carnegie Hall in 2001. Initially shelved, the remake saw an official release in 2021 with the entire Toy album as part of the Brilliant Adventure (1992–2001) box set.

== Background and composition ==
David Bowie originally demoed "Silly Boy Blue" with his band the Lower Third in August 1965 at R. G. Jones Studio in London, around the same time as "Baby That's a Promise". This version featured a lyric about a teenage runaway who flees school to hide in London and a Mod-sound influenced by the Beatles. Biographers Chris O'Leary and Nicholas Pegg compare it to Bowie's contemporary compositions "Can't Help Thinking About Me" and "The London Boys". This demo has since appeared on bootlegs.

I want to go to Tibet. It's a fascinating place, you know ... The Tibetan monks, lamas, bury themselves inside mountains for weeks and only eat every three days. They're ridiculous – and it's said they live for centuries.

—David Bowie, Melody Maker, February 1966

In 1966, Bowie re-recorded the song during the sessions for his self-titled debut album. With Mike Vernon producing and Gus Dudgeon engineering, the session took place from 8 to 9 December 1966 at Decca Studios in London. While the song retained its structure—four verses and a bridge—key and melodies, Bowie rewrote the lyrics to reflect his newfound interest in Tibetan Buddhism. He filled the lyrics with spiritual and geographic Buddhist references, including a "Child of Tibet"; Tibetan capital Lhasa; the Potala, a palace that the Dalai Lamas resided in during the winter until 1959; chelas or religious disciples; the concept of reincarnation; and "Yak-butter statues". AllMusic editor Richie Unterberger noted that these themes were ambitious and "not exactly standard fare" for 1967. The song's main character is a young Tibetan monk who cannot pay attention and is at odds with his own culture.

Bowie's infatuation with Buddhism led him to experiment more in the studio. As such, this version of "Silly Boy Blue" featured varied instrumentation. The first verse is backed by orchestral trumpet fanfares and cello and lacks drums; drummer John Eager played a Chinese gong. Marion Constable, Bowie's first female backing vocalist, sings what O'Leary compares to a "chanting monk" on her vocals. Nevertheless, he and arranger Dek Fearnley filled the recording with contemporary pop motifs: the second verse features Eager playing a drum beat similar to Hal Blaine's on the Ronettes' "Be My Baby" (1963); a Burt Bacharach and Beach Boys-style outro; and the bassline is compared by O'Leary to Them's version of Bob Dylan's "It's All Over Now, Baby Blue" (1965).

The song's melody begins with a dominant E chord in A major. The tonic A moves between subdominant and dominant D and E, respectively, chords. The bridge opens with an F♯ minor chord, eventually building to a B major climax with Bowie singing a drawn out "die", which drops from a high G down to a C. The coda drifts between B and A, ending the song's active key signatures. Author Paul Trynka called it one of the prettiest melodies on the album.

== Release and aftermath ==
Deram Records issued David Bowie in the United Kingdom on 1 June 1967, with "Silly Boy Blue" sequenced as the second track on side two of the original LP, between "Little Bombardier" and "Come and Buy My Toys". The album flopped, in part due to a lack of promotion from Deram. Unterberger considered the track one of the album's better songs, but found its arrangement brought down the recording, thereby "obscuring a song that was actually pretty lyrically ambitious". He further criticised Bowie's vocal performance as "too operatic", but praised the melody. Unterberger ultimately felt the 1966 demo, although unfinished, was superior to the David Bowie version. Mojo magazine listed it as Bowie's 78th greatest song in 2015.

During his brief stint with the Riot Squad in the spring of 1967, Bowie recorded another version of "Silly Boy Blue" on 5 April, again at Decca Studios, along with "Toy Soldier" and a cover of the Velvet Underground's "Waiting for the Man" (1967). Seven instrumental takes were taped for use in the Riot Squad's live sets. According to Pegg, this recording is a more conventional beat-style rendition than the David Bowie recording. Yet another acoustic recording with the Riot Squad and Bowie on vocals appeared on The Last Chapter: Mods & Sods compilation and The Toy Soldier EP.

Bowie performed "Silly Boy Blue" throughout Lindsay Kemp's mime production Pierrot in Turquoise in March 1968. The same year, an adapted take of the track appeared in Bowie's Tibetan mime piece Jetsun and the Eagle. The song also featured in two of Bowie's BBC radio sessions on 18 December 1967 and 13 May 1968, respectively. The first version was similar to the album version and later appeared on the 2010 deluxe edition of David Bowie, while the second featured a new lavish string arrangement from Tony Visconti and a "Chime" chant from Bowie that pays tribute to his Buddhist teacher Chime Youngdong Rinpoche. This version later appeared on Bowie at the Beeb (2000).

Bowie pitched the song to other artists as potential cover material, although it was rejected by Judy Collins, Jefferson Airplane and Big Brother and the Holding Company. The song was eventually accepted by Billy Fury, whose version appeared as the B-side of his unsuccessful Parlophone single "One Minute Woman" in March 1968. Fury's version later appeared on the 2006 compilation Oh! You Pretty Things. Bowie himself revisited the Tibetan themes of "Silly Boy Blue" for his 1967 composition "Karma Man" and 1997 single "Seven Years in Tibet".

== Toy version ==
"Silly Boy Blue"

Song by David Bowie

from the album Toy
- Released: 15 October 2021
- Recorded: July–October 2000
- Studio: Sear Sound and Looking Glass, New York City
- Length: 5:35
- Label: ISO; Parlophone
- Songwriter: David Bowie
- Producers: David Bowie; Mark Plati

Bowie re-recorded "Silly Boy Blue" during the sessions for the Toy project between July and October 2000, along with other tracks he wrote and recorded in the mid-1960s. The lineup consisted of the members of Bowie's then-touring band: guitarist Earl Slick, bassist Gail Ann Dorsey, pianist Mike Garson, musician Mark Plati and drummer Sterling Campbell. With co-production from Bowie and Plati, the band rehearsed the songs at Sear Sound Studios in New York City before recording them as live tracks. Plati stated that he refused to listen to Bowie's original recordings of the tracks, as so to prevent the originals from influencing his playing on the new versions. Overdubs were recorded at New York's Looking Glass Studios. According to Pegg, the new version is more akin to the 1968 BBC recording than the David Bowie album version.

On 26 February 2001, Bowie performed the Toy arrangement of "Silly Boy Blue" for the Tibet House benefit concert at New York's Carnegie Hall, where he was backed by the Scorchio Quarter and a troupe of monks. Pegg and Trynka praise this performance as "spectacular" and "extraordinary", respectively. Toy was initially intended for release in March 2001, before it was shelved by EMI/Virgin due to financial issues. So, Bowie departed the label and recorded his next album Heathen (2002). In March 2011, tracks from the Toy sessions, including "Silly Boy Blue", were leaked online, attracting media attention. Ten years later, on 29 September 2021, Warner Music Group announced that Toy would get an official release on 26 November as part of the box set Brilliant Adventure (1992–2001) through ISO and Parlophone. "Karma Man" and an "alternative ending mix" of "Silly Boy Blue" were released as a single ahead of the release on 15 October.

A separate deluxe edition, titled Toy:Box, was released on 7 January 2022, which contains two new mixes of the song: an "alternative mix" and an "Unplugged and Somewhat Slightly Electric" mix, featuring new guitar parts by Plati and Slick. Reviewing Toy, The Guardian's Alexis Petridis praised the remake as an improvement over the original, arguing that a "more striking" arrangement transforms it from the "stagey original" to "something stately and anthemic". Brenna Ehrlich of Rolling Stone noted the remake as an unintentional callback to Bowie's 1986 Labyrinth track "Underground".

== Personnel ==
According to Chris O'Leary:

Original version

- David Bowie – vocals, arranger
- Derek Boyes – piano, backing vocals
- Dek Fearnley – bass, backing vocals, arranger
- John Eager – drums, Chinese gong, backing vocals
- Marion Constable – backing vocals
- Unknown musicians – violin, cello, trumpets

Technical

- Mike Vernon – producer
- Gus Dudgeon – engineer

Toy version

- David Bowie – vocals, producer
- Earl Slick – lead guitar
- Gerry Leonard – rhythm guitar
- Gail Ann Dorsey – bass, backing vocals
- Mike Garson – keyboards
- Mark Plati – rhythm guitar, producer
- Sterling Campbell – drums
- Holly Palmer – backing vocals
- Emm Gryner – backing vocals
- Unknown musicians – violins, violas, celli
- Tony Visconti – string arrangement
