= Images 1966–1967 =

Compilation album by David Bowie
- Released: February 1973
- Recorded: 1966–67
- Genres: Music hall, pop
- Length: 58:55
- Labels: Deram, London
- Producer: Mike Vernon (except where indicated)

David Bowie chronology
The Rise and Fall of Ziggy Stardust and the Spiders from Mars (1972)	Images 1966–1967 (1973)	Aladdin Sane (1973)

Professional ratings
Review scores
Source	Rating
AllMusic	3/5 stars
The Encyclopedia of Popular Music	2/5 stars
The Rolling Stone Album Guide	2/5 stars
Spin Alternative Record Guide	2/10

Images 1966–1967 is a 1973 compilation album by English singer-songwriter David Bowie. It comprises his 1967 self-titled debut album for Deram Records and various singles and B-sides recorded for Deram between 1966 and 1967.

The arrangements on this compilation are not reminiscent of the glam rock that broke Bowie through to success. They are mostly orchestral with sound effects created in the recording studio. The music was recorded early in Bowie's career when he was still in obscurity, from 1966 to 1967. At the time he was signed to Deram Records, who dropped him in 1968 due to poor sales, before his first hit, "Space Oddity", in 1969. At the time of the music's recording, Bowie was influenced by the London cabaret scene and the song styles created therein, particularly the work of singers such as Anthony Newley.

In the UK, The World of David Bowie had never gone out of print, when Bowie finally had his breakthrough in 1972 with the album Ziggy Stardust and the Spiders from Mars, and could still be obtained in British record shops at that time. In the US, where none of the Deram material was released since 1967, the original LP and singles were packaged into this double-album set and released in the US on Decca's American branded label, London Records. The release came at about the same time as Bowie's sixth studio album, Aladdin Sane, as Bowie was gaining popularity in the US. American copies of the compilation featured a cartoon cover, depicting characters or situations from each song. The compilation gained Bowie a significant 1973 hit, "The Laughing Gnome".

The album cover was designed by Neon Park, known for his similar artwork for Frank Zappa's Weasels Ripped My Flesh. In 1975 the album was issued in the U.K. with a new front cover featuring a Young Americans promotional photo and the U.S. cartoon design relegated to the inner gatefold.

== Track listing ==
All tracks are written by David Bowie

Side one
No.	Title	Length
1.	"Rubber Band"	2:15
2.	"Maid of Bond Street"	1:44
3.	"Sell Me a Coat"	3:00
4.	"Love You till Tuesday"	3:10
5.	"There Is a Happy Land"	3:11

Side two
No.	Title	Length
6.	"The Laughing Gnome"	3:03
7.	"The Gospel According to Tony Day"	2:50
8.	"Did You Ever Have a Dream"	2:08
9.	"Uncle Arthur"	2:07
10.	"We Are Hungry Men"	2:58
11.	"When I Live My Dream"	3:25

Side three
No.	Title	Length
1.	"Join the Gang"	2:16
2.	"Little Bombardier"	3:24
3.	"Come and Buy My Toys"	2:07
4.	"Silly Boy Blue"	3:51
5.	"She's Got Medals"	2:26

Side four
No.	Title	Length
6.	"Please Mr. Gravedigger"	2:34
7.	"London Boys"	3:18
8.	"Karma Man"	3:03
9.	"Let Me Sleep Beside You"	3:24
10.	"In the Heat of the Morning" (produced by Tony Visconti)	2:59

== Chart performance ==
In the United States, Images 1966–1967 peaked at number 144 on the Billboard 200 during 1973.
