= The London Boys =

1966 song by David Bowie

Single by David Bowie
- A-side: "Rubber Band"
- Released: 2 December 1966 (as B-side); 2 May 1975 (as A-side)
- Recorded: 18 October 1966
- Studio: RG Jones, London
- Length: 3:20
- Label: Deram
- Songwriter(s): David Bowie
- Producer(s): David Bowie, Dek Fearnley

Alternative cover
- Cover of the 1975 single

"The London Boys" is a song by the English musician David Bowie. It was first released as the B-side of the single "Rubber Band" in the United Kingdom on 2 December 1966. It was originally written and demoed in 1965 with the Lower Third for potential release as the artist's debut single for Pye Records but it was rejected. After a year of rewrites, he recorded a new version with a new band, the Buzz, which helped secure him a record contract with Decca-subsidiary Deram Records. Unlike the A-side, "The London Boys" retains the Mod feel of Bowie's previous singles. The dark lyrics concern a 17-year-old who leaves home for London and becomes embroiled in the Mod scene (the "London Boys" of the title), turning to pills to fit in. Like his previous singles, it failed to chart. Decca later issued it as an A-side in 1975.

Bowie's biographers and other reviewers have praised "The London Boys" as one of his finest tracks of the era. He considered re-recording the song for his covers album Pin Ups in 1973, although the idea was abandoned. After reviving it unexpectedly for live performances in 2000, Bowie re-recorded the song in 2000 for the Toy project, which was initially shelved and released posthumously in 2021. The new version is more guitar-led compared to the original. Artists who have covered the song include English artists the Times and Marc Almond, whose version was praised by Bowie himself.

== Writing and recording ==
David Bowie wrote "The London Boys" in early 1965 under the title "Now You've Met the London Boys". According to biographer Kevin Cann, the song garnered a positive response during his live performances with his band the Lower Third throughout the year, and it quickly became a live favourite. Later in the year, Bowie and the Lower Third taped "The London Boys" on 25 November at London's Marble Arch Studios for potential release as the artist's debut single for Pye Records. However, the song was rejected by the label on the grounds of risque lyrical content; this recording is considered lost. Drummer Phil Lancaster recalled both himself and Bowie being deeply hurt by its rejection. Producer Tony Hatch later told biographer Paul Trynka: "I remember 'The London Boys'. There were a lot of songs about his background. There was one about the Hackney Marshes which is probably in some archive somewhere."

After it was rejected, Bowie rewrote the song as "Can't Help Thinking About Me", which was chosen as the single instead. In an interview for Melody Maker promoting "Can't Help Thinking About Me" in February 1966, Bowie referred to "The London Boys" by its original title: "Its called 'Now You've Met the London Boys', and mentions pills, and generally belittles the London night-life scene ... it goes down very well in the stage act and lots of fans said I should have released it – but Tony and I thought the words were a bit strong."

Over the next year, Bowie continued playing the song live and tinkered with the lyrics and arrangement. Following his dismissal from Pye in September 1966, Bowie, with his new band the Buzz, recorded a new version of "The London Boys" and two new songs, "Rubber Band" and "The Gravedigger" (later retitled "Please Mr. Gravedigger"), at London's RG Jones Recording Studios on 18 October 1966. The session was financed by Bowie's soon-to-be manager Kenneth Pitt, who used the session tapes to secure Bowie a record contract with Deram Records, the progressive pop subsidiary of Decca Records. Deram chose "Rubber Band" as the A-side of Bowie's debut single for the label, while "The London Boys" became the B-side.

== Composition ==
Unlike the A-side "Rubber Band", "The London Boys" retains the Mod feel of Bowie's previous singles, although it uses the same brass instrument players as the A-side. He based rewrites of the song on the Kinks' "Where Have All the Good Times Gone" and "See My Friends". The instruments act in tandem with Bowie's vocal performance; while primarily led by organ and bass, the orchestra's tuba, oboe and trumpet work as a chorus. Chris O'Leary notes numerous key changes throughout, alternating between F major and E♭ major, to doses in F♯, F minor and F major chords, eventually rising to an A major finale.

In a press release for the single, Deram described the track as "David Bowie's partly autobiographical cameo of the brave and defiant little mod racing uphill along Wardour Street to an empty Paradise." The song has been described by writer Marc Spitz as a "hangover ballad", and by James Perone, who writes that the song gives a rather unpleasant view of the mid-1960s Swinging London era.

The gender of the song's protagonist is not explicit: James Perone assumes the character is female, but Chris O'Leary notes that, "it seems to fit better as a boy (gay or straight)'s song... [but] this is far from the last sexually ambiguous Bowie lyric." The final verse includes the line "you're crying out loud that you're a London boy", addressed to the protagonist, which seems to bolster this view.

== Release ==
"The London Boys" was issued by Deram as the B-side of "Rubber Band" in the United Kingdom on 2 December 1966, with the catalogue number Deram DM107. For the American release, issued on 27 May 1967 and with the re-recorded album version of "Rubber Band", "There Is a Happy Land" (taken from David Bowie [1967]) replaced "The London Boys" due to the latter's drug references. In the UK, "Rubber Band" once more failed to break into the charts as with all of Bowie's previous singles. A writer for Disc, a British music magazine, discarded the A-side but gave praise to the B-side, believing it "would have been a much more impressive topside". In his memoir, Pitt praised the track: "I thought it was a remarkable song, and in it David had brilliantly evoked the atmosphere of his generation and his London."

In subsequent decades, Bowie's biographers have hailed "The London Boys" as one of his finest tracks up to that point. Nicholas Pegg writes that it "is among Bowie's most sophisticated recordings of the period, demonstrating a mature grasp of pace and dynamics", a sentiment echoed by Spitz, who considered it "far superior" to the A-side. NME editors Roy Carr and Charles Shaar Murray concurred, writing in 1981: "The B-side is a far more serious affair, and probably the most moving and pertinent work that Bowie produced prior to 'Space Oddity' [1969]. Sung in the second person to a young provincial would be mod trying to keep up with the ace faces in the Big Smoke, 'The London Boys' is a slow agonising portrayal of the inevitable comedown from the amphetamine exhilaration of 'My Generation'." O'Leary hailed Bowie's vocal performance as his strongest to date. Meanwhile, Perone notes that the song foreshadowed the complex melodic and harmonic structures of Bowie's 1970s works. Mojo magazine listed it as Bowie's 91st best track in 2015.

Bowie considered re-recording the song for his covers album Pin Ups in 1973, where he would intersperse his own verses with lyrics from other covers, thereby, in Pegg's words, "creating a narrative bridging the sounds of his youth", although the idea was abandoned. Decca rereleased the song as an A-side in May 1975, with "Love You till Tuesday" as the B-side. "The London Boys" has since appeared on various compilation albums, including The World of David Bowie (1970), Images 1966–1967 (1973) and The Deram Anthology 1966–1968 (1997). AllMusic reviewers Alex Henderson and Richie Unterberger called the track the standout of World and Images, respectively, with the latter calling it "a neglected classic look at the downer side of the mod experience, and is the best of [Bowie's] many obscure pre-'Space Oddity' recordings."

Artists who have covered "The London Boys" include the English indie band the Times for their 1983 album I Helped Patrick McGoohan Escape and English singer Marc Almond for his 2007 album Stardom Road. Bowie himself sent Almond a letter stating he thought his version was superior to the original.

== Personnel ==
According to Chris O'Leary:

"Now You've Met the London Boys" (unreleased)

- David Bowie – vocals
- Denis Taylor – guitar
- Graham Rivens – bass
- Phil Lancaster – drums
- Tony Hatch – piano

"The London Boys" (single version)

- David Bowie – vocals, producer
- Derek Boyes – organ
- Dek Fearnley – bass, producer
- John Eager – drums
- Chick Norton – trumpet
- Unknown musicians – tuba and oboe

== Toy version ==
"The London Boys"

Song by David Bowie

from the album Toy
- Released: 26 November 2021
- Recorded: July–October 2000
- Studio: Sear Sound and Looking Glass (New York City)
- Length: 3:47
- Label: ISO/Parlophone
- Songwriter(s): David Bowie
- Producer(s): David Bowie, Mark Plati

Bowie unexpectedly revived "The London Boys" during his summer 2000 tour. Shortly after, he re-recorded "The London Boys" during the sessions for the Toy project between July and October 2000, along with other tracks he wrote and recorded during the mid-1960s, including "Can't Help Thinking About Me". The lineup consisted of members of Bowie's then-touring band: guitarist Earl Slick, bassist Gail Ann Dorsey, pianist Mike Garson, musician Mark Plati and drummer Sterling Campbell, along with instrumentalist Lisa Germano on violin and backing vocalists Holly Palmer and Emm Gryner. Co-produced by Bowie and Plati, the band rehearsed the songs at Sear Sound Studios in New York City before recording them as live tracks. Plati stated that he refused to listen to Bowie's original recordings of the tracks, so to prevent the originals from influencing his playing on the new versions. Overdubs were recorded at New York's Looking Glass Studios.

Toy was initially intended for release in March 2001, before it was shelved by EMI/Virgin due to financial issues. So, Bowie departed the label and recorded his next album Heathen (2002). Two excerpts appeared on Bowie's website BowieNet in 2002, one in July that was 1:26 in length and the other in August that was 1:30. It also was performed for a special BowieNetter gig in 2000. In March 2011, tracks from the Toy sessions, including "The London Boys", were leaked online, attracting media attention.

Ten years later, on 29 September 2021, Warner Music Group announced that Toy would get an official release on 26 November as part of the box set Brilliant Adventure (1992–2001) through ISO and Parlophone. A separate deluxe edition, titled Toy:Box, was released on 7 January 2022, which contains two new mixes of the song: an "alternate mix" and an "Unplugged and Somewhat Slightly Electric" mix, featuring new guitar parts by Plati and Slick. Reviewing Toy, Alexis Petridis in The Guardian found the remake of "The London Boys" "loses something of its grimy kitchen-sink drama quality amid the new distorted guitar and synth arrangement". Helen Brown of The Independent noted that the new version "sheds the ambitious Bromley boy’s plaintive panic for a smoothly soulful narrative that soars into the arms of a brassy crescendo".

=== Personnel ===
According to Chris O'Leary:

- David Bowie – vocals, producer
- Earl Slick – lead guitar
- Gerry Leonard – rhythm guitar
- Gail Ann Dorsey – bass, backing vocals
- Mike Garson – keyboards
- Mark Plati – bass, rhythm guitar, producer
- Sterling Campbell – drums
- Holly Palmer – backing vocals
- Emm Gryner – backing vocals
- Unknown musicians – oboe, trumpet, violin, viola, cello
- Tony Visconti – string arrangement
