= David Bowie (1967 album) =

1967 studio album by David Bowie

Studio album by David Bowie
- Released: 1 June 1967
- Recorded: 14 November 1966 – 1 March 1967
- Studio: Decca (London)
- Genres: Baroque pop; music hall
- Length: 38:19
- Label: Deram
- Producer: Mike Vernon

David Bowie chronology
David Bowie (1967)	David Bowie (1969)

Singles from David Bowie
- 1. "Love You till Tuesday" Released: 14 July 1967

David Bowie is the debut studio album by the English musician David Bowie, originally released in the United Kingdom on 1 June 1967 through Decca subsidiary Deram Records. Produced by Mike Vernon and recorded from November 1966 to March 1967 in London, the album followed a string of singles Bowie released for Pye Records that failed to chart. Vernon hired numerous studio musicians for the album's sessions; Bowie and his former Buzz bandmate Derek Fearnley composed music charts themselves using a musical guidebook.

The album displays a baroque pop and music hall sound influenced by Anthony Newley and the Edwardian styles of contemporary British rock bands. The songs are primarily led by orchestral brass and woodwind instruments rather than traditional instruments in pop music at the time, although some tracks feature guitar. The lyrical content varies from lighthearted childhood innocence to drug use and totalitarianism, themes that Bowie returned to in later works. The cover artwork is a headshot of Bowie with a mod haircut and wearing a high-collared jacket.

Released in both mono and stereo mixes, David Bowie received positive reviews from music journalists but was a commercial failure due to a lack of promotion from Deram. Two tracks were omitted for its release in the United States in August 1967. Following its release, Bowie provided more tracks for Deram, all of which were rejected and led to his departure from the label. Retrospective reviews unfavourably compare David Bowie to Bowie's later works, but some recognise it positively on its own terms. The album was reissued in a two-disc deluxe edition in 2010, featuring both mixes and other tracks from the period.

== Background ==
David Bowie was let go from Pye Records in September 1966 following a string of singles that failed to chart. A lack of promotion from Pye also contributed to his disenchantment with the label. In order to secure him a new record contract, his soon-to-be manager Kenneth Pitt financed a recording session at London's RG Jones Recording Studios. On 18 October, Bowie and his backing band the Buzz conducted a four-hour session with a group of local studio musicians, producing a new version of the rejected Pye track "The London Boys" and two new songs, "Rubber Band" and "The Gravedigger".

Pitt showed acetates of the tracks to executives at Decca Records, who were impressed and signed Bowie to the label's progressive pop subsidiary label Deram Records. His contract gave him a deal that financed the production of a full-length studio album and paid £150 for the three tracks and a further advance of £100 for royalties on the album. According to the biographer Nicholas Pegg, being granted an album deal before having a hit single was a rare occurrence at the time. Decca A&R manager Hugh Mendl later said: "I had a minor obsession about David—I just thought he was the most talented, magical person. ... I think I would have signed him even if he didn't have such obvious musical talent. But he did have talent. He was bursting with creativity."

== Writing and recording ==
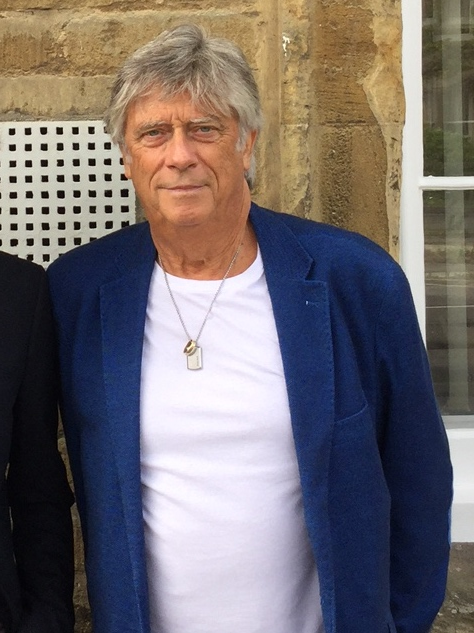
David Bowie was produced by Mike Vernon (pictured in 2017), who hired musicians that were integral to the album's sound.

Bowie spent time before the album sessions writing songs, accumulating almost 30 new compositions. According to the author Paul Trynka, his songwriting focused less on traditional instrumentation and more in favour of orchestral arrangements, in the vein of the Beach Boys' recently released Pet Sounds. The sessions officially commenced on 14 November 1966 at Decca Studio 2 in West Hampstead, London with the recording of "Uncle Arthur" and "She's Got Medals". Decca in-house producer Mike Vernon handled production while Gus Dudgeon engineered. Bowie's band the Buzz contributed with the exception of keyboardist Derek Boyes.

We didn't realise how ludicrous [the scores] must have looked. I guess it was just the audacity of it that none of the guys laughed us out of the studio. They actually tried to play our parts and they made sense of them. They're quite nice little string parts – we were writing for bassoon and everything. If Stravinsky can do it, then we can do it!

— David Bowie, 1993

Rather than hire an arranger, Bowie and Buzz member Derek "Dek" Fearnley used Freda Dinn's Observer's Guide to Music, a musical guidebook, to study orchestra arrangements and requested Vernon hire the appropriate musicians. Fearnley had little experience writing music charts, while Bowie could not read music at all, so Fearnley found it a daunting task, later stating: "It was bloody hard work. I knew how to read the staves and that a bar had four crotches; David had never seen or written a note, so I was the one qualified to write stuff out." He found that when presenting the charts to the musicians, some of whom were members of the London Philharmonic Orchestra, they threw them back and requested new scores, which he had to do himself while Bowie monitored from the control room.

"There Is a Happy Land", "We Are Hungry Men", "Join the Gang" and the B-side "Did You Ever Have a Dream" were completed by 24 November. Around the same time, Pitt and Bowie's current manager Ralph Horton decided that Bowie would cease live performances so he could focus on recording the album and that he would part ways with the Buzz. Bowie and the Buzz made their final live performance together on 2 December, the same day Deram issued the "Rubber Band" single. The sessions continued between 8 and 13 December with the recording of "Sell Me a Coat", "Little Bombardier", "Silly Boy Blue", "Maid of Bond Street", "Come and Buy My Toys" and "The Gravedigger", now titled "Please Mr. Gravedigger".

Besides the orchestra, Vernon hired several uncredited session musicians who were integral to the album's sound; credited players included guitarist John Renbourn, whose playing is heard prominently on "Come and Buy My Toys", and multi-instrumentalist Big Jim Sullivan, who contributed banjo and sitar on "Did You Ever Have a Dream" and "Join the Gang", respectively. Fearnley's friend Marion Constable also contributed backing vocals to "Silly Boy Blue". Vernon recalled having "a lot of fun" during the sessions and described Bowie as "the easiest person to work with", further adding that "some of the melodies were extremely good, and the actual material, the lyrics, had a quality that was quite unique". Dudgeon also found the material unique, telling the biographer David Buckley that "the music was very filmic, all very visual and all quite honest and unaffected".

A provisional running order was drawn up at the end of December 1966, which included tracks that were absent from the final album, such as "Did You Ever Have a Dream", "Your Funny Smile" and "Bunny Thing". In mid-January 1967, Bowie fired Horton as his manager after months of financial mismanagement and hired Pitt in his place. Bowie and the musicians reconvened at Decca on 26 January, recording the backing tracks for "The Laughing Gnome" and "The Gospel According to Tony Day", which were chosen as the next single; vocals were added in early February. A new version of "Rubber Band" was recorded for inclusion on the album on 25 February, as well as "Love You till Tuesday" and "When I Live My Dream". These tracks featured uncredited arrangements by Arthur Greenslade. The sessions completed on 1 March.

David Bowie was mixed in both mono and stereo. According to Pegg, the two variants featured minor differences in instrumentation and mixing: mono editions used slightly different mixes of "Uncle Arthur" and "Please Mr. Gravedigger".

== Styles and themes ==
Lyrically, I guess it was striving to be something, the short story teller. Musically it's quite bizarre. I don't know where I was at. It seemed to have its roots all over the place, in rock and vaudeville and music hall. I didn't know if I was Max Miller or Elvis Presley.

— David Bowie on the album, 1990

David Bowie consists of 14 tracks, all written entirely by Bowie. His influences at this time included Anthony Newley, music hall acts like Tommy Steele, British-centred material by Ray Davies of the Kinks, Syd Barrett's psychedelic nursery rhymes for early Pink Floyd and the Edwardian flair shared by the contemporary works of the Kinks and the Beatles. Pitt's desire for Bowie to become an "all-around entertainer" rather than a "rock star" also impacted the songwriter's style. According to the author James E. Perone, the songs include styles of up-tempo pop, rock and waltz; BBC Music retrospectively categorised David Bowie as baroque pop and music hall. Rather than using traditional instruments in pop music at the time, such as guitar, piano, bass and drums, the instruments on David Bowie likened to those in music hall and classical music, such as brass instruments (tuba, trumpet and French horn) and woodwind instruments (bassoon, oboe, English horn and piccolo). Buckley notes almost a complete absence of lead guitar in the final mix.

Brass-led tracks include "Rubber Band", "Little Bombardier" and "Maid of Bond Street", woodwind-led tracks include "Uncle Arthur" and "She's Got Medals". "Little Bombardier" and "Maid of Bond Street" are in waltz time, while "Join the Gang" includes sitar and a musical quotation of the Spencer Davis Group's recent hit "Gimme Some Lovin'". Newley's influence is present on "Love You till Tuesday", "Little Bombardier" and "She's Got Medals". Regarding the influence, Newley himself stated in 1992: "I always made fun of it, in a sense. Most of my records ended in a stupid giggle, trying to tell people that I wasn't being serious. I think Bowie liked that irreverent thing, and his delivery was very similar to mine, that Cockney thing."

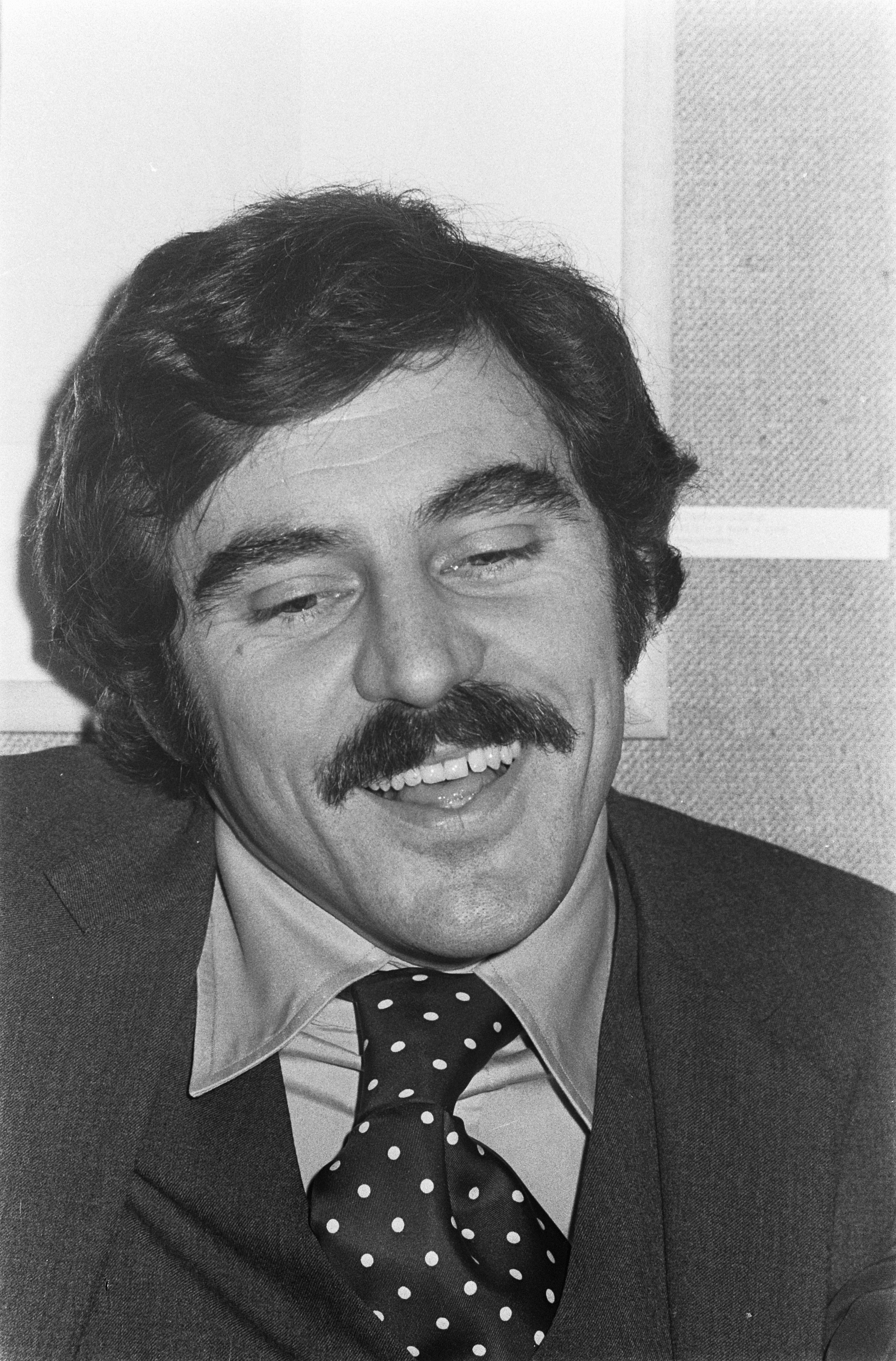
The album's sound has been compared to Anthony Newley (pictured in 1967).

"Love You till Tuesday" and "Come and Buy My Toys" are among the few songs on the album with an acoustic guitar, the former heavily augmented by strings. The latter is noted by the biographer Chris O'Leary as more minimalist in nature, and exemplifies folk in a way the author Peter Doggett likens to Simon & Garfunkel. "Please Mr. Gravedigger", which Buckley described as "one of pop's genuinely crazy moments", utilises various studio sound effects and no backing instrumentation. Biographers compare it to a radio play from the 1940s and 1950s and consider it a comedic parody of the old British song "Oh! Mr Porter".

Like the music, the lyrical themes on David Bowie are widespread, ranging from lighthearted, to dark, to funny to sarcastic. The characters range from societal outcasts, to losers, "near-philosophers" and dictators. According to O'Leary, David Bowie found Bowie composing third-person narratives compared to the first-person love stories of his previous releases, a statement echoed by Kevin Cann, who likens the song narratives to traditional folk stories. In 1976, Bowie commented that "the idea of writing sort of short stories, I thought was quite novel at the time". Marc Spitz writes that David Bowie contains several "vaguely dark, arcane English story songs" ("Please Mr. Gravedigger", "Uncle Arthur", "Maid on Bond Street") that Pitt envisioned Bowie performing in lounges. "Rubber Band", "Little Bombardier" and "She's Got Medals" all evoke the Edwardian theme.

Lighthearted themes, such as childhood innocence, are celebrated in "Sell Me a Coat", "When I Live My Dream" and "Come and Buy My Toys", as well as the psychedelic-influenced "There Is a Happy Land", which took its title and subject matter from the Andrew Young hymn of the same name. "Silly Boy Blue" expresses Bowie's then-recent interest in Buddhism. Darker ideals such as peer pressure and drug use are discussed in "Join the Gang", while "We Are Hungry Men" depicts a totalitarian world that reflects messianic worship and cannibalism in a comedic way. "Little Bombardier" concerns a war veteran who is forced to leave town after being suspected for pedophilia, and the a cappella "Please Mr. Gravedigger" details a child-murderer contemplating his next victim while standing in a graveyard.

== Release ==
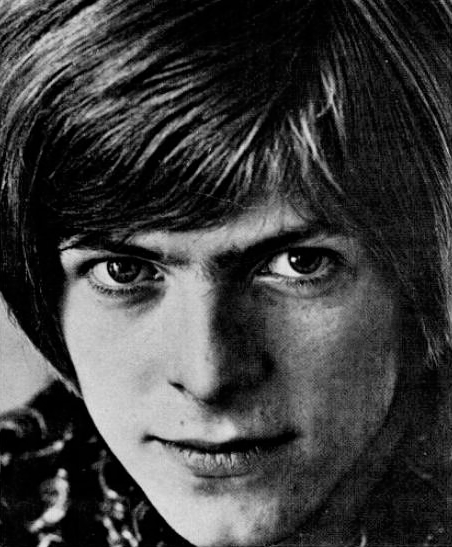
Bowie in a trade ad for the "Love You till Tuesday" single.

David Bowie was released in the United Kingdom on 1 June 1967, with the catalogue numbers DML 1007 (mono) and SML 1007 (stereo). Its release coincided with the Beatles' Sgt. Pepper's Lonely Hearts Club Band. The American release, issued in August 1967, omitted "We Are Hungry Men" and "Maid of Bond Street", which Pegg speculates was possibly due to the US practice of trimming track listings in order to "reduce publishing royalties".

The sleeve photograph is a full-headshot of Bowie in a mod haircut wearing a high-collared jacket. The sleeve was taken by Fearnley's brother Gerald in his basement studio near Marble Arch, where Bowie and Dek Fearnley had conducted rehearsals for the sessions. Bowie himself chose the jacket and later recalled that he was "very proud" of it, quipping that "it was actually tailored". Spitz considers the image "very rooted" in the mid-1960s, while Consequence of Sound's Blake Goble called it "perhaps the most uninteresting and dated album cover of Bowie's career" in 2018. Pitt's sleeve notes described Bowie's vision as "straight and sharp as a laser beam. It cuts through hypocrisy, prejudice and cant. It sees the bitterness of humanity, but rarely bitterly. It sees the humour in our failings, the pathos of our virtues."

Despite promotional attempts by other countries outside the UK and US, David Bowie was a commercial failure, in part due to lack of promotion from Deram; the label were unimpressed with the "Rubber Band" single and one of the executives who was instrumental in Bowie's signing departed the company in May 1967, leaving little confidence in Bowie. Vernon later felt that Decca "didn't understand what rock music was ... at all". Bowie's other Deram singles "The Laughing Gnome" and a remake of "Love You till Tuesday", issued in April and July, respectively, both failed to chart, further signalling his downturn with the label.

=== Reception ===
David Bowie received few, albeit positive, reviews from music critics on release. In the New Musical Express, Allen Evans praised the record as "all very refreshing" and called the artist "a very promising talent", with "a fresh sound to [Bowie and Fearnley's] light musical arrangements". Chris Welch of Melody Maker enjoyed the album as "a singularly rewarding collection" featuring "excellent" production. Welch was surprised Bowie had yet to impact the pop scene. A reviewer for Disc & Music Echo described the album as "a remarkable, creative debut album by a 19-year-old Londoner", declaring: "Here is a new talent that deserves attention, for though David Bowie has no great voice, he can project words with a cheeky 'side' that is endearing yet not precious ... full of abstract fascination. Try David Bowie. He's something new." The journalist also suggested that Bowie could garner more attention if he "gets the breaker and the right singles". Pitt sent copies of David Bowie to music executives in order to generate publicity, receiving letters of admiration from Lionel Bart, Bryan Forbes and Franco Zeffirelli.

== Subsequent events ==
After the album's failure, Bowie recorded several more tracks for Deram from late 1967 to early 1968 as potential singles, all of which were rejected. Departing from the sound of David Bowie, these included "Let Me Sleep Beside You", "Karma Man", a new version of "When I Live My Dream", "In the Heat of the Morning" and a remake of "London Bye Ta–Ta". The failure of David Bowie, its singles and failed follow-up attempts led to Bowie's departure from Deram in May 1968. Outside of music, he acted in mime actor Lindsay Kemp's play Pierrot in Turquoise throughout early 1968, performing the David Bowie songs "When I Live My Dream", "Sell Me a Coat" and "Come and Buy My Toys".

The commercial failure of David Bowie led Pitt to authorize a promotional film in an attempt to introduce Bowie to a larger audience. The film, Love You till Tuesday, went unreleased until 1984. Bowie wrote a new song for the film, "Space Oddity", a tale about a fictional astronaut. Produced by Dudgeon and released as a single in July 1969 for Mercury affiliate Philips Records, "Space Oddity" became the artist's first hit, 18 months after David Bowie's release.

== Legacy ==
I wouldn't say that we struggled, but it was an adventure. I wasn't sure what to make of [the album] at the time or if it was even commercial, but as usual, I just put all my likes and dislikes aside and got on with it. It was a very, very quirky one-off record and ideal for Deram.

— Mike Vernon, 2009

David Bowie, and the Deram period in general, were routinely mocked throughout Bowie's career, being dismissed, in Pegg's words, as "music-hall piffle derived from a passing Anthony Newley fad". Dudgeon later acknowledged the similarities to Newley, saying that it "bothered" him and Vernon because they felt Bowie was "really good and his songs are fucking great". Bowie himself downplayed or disowned the period entirely in later decades, dismissing it as "cringey" in 1990. According to Pegg, Bowie's fans have attempted to place blame on Pitt for the record's sound, despite Pitt being absent from Bowie's person during the majority of the writing and recording period. The manager himself dismissed the theory in his memoir, stating that it was Bowie's sole idea to mimic Newley.

Other claims made about David Bowie include the argument that it sounded like nothing else at the time, which is mostly attributed to Dudgeon's "oft-quoted" description of the album as "about the weirdest thing any record company have ever put out". Pegg contests this idea, writing that the record's blend of "folk and short-story narrative" shared similarities with the more commercial releases of the British psychedelia movement of 1966–1967, while the motifs of wartime nostalgia and childhood innocence reflected the contemporary ideals of Syd Barrett's Pink Floyd, the Bonzo Dog Doo-Dah Band and the Beatles. The Beatles, in particular, embellished similar ideas as David Bowie into their recent records Revolver (1966) and Sgt. Pepper: the latter's "Being for the Benefit of Mr. Kite!" matched the waltz-style of "Little Bombardier", while Pegg compares the styles of "Uncle Arthur", "She's Got Medals" and "Sell Me a Coat" to "Eleanor Rigby", "Lovely Rita" and "She's Leaving Home". Buckley writes that Bowie's use of brass and woodwinds on "Rubber Band" predated their use by the Beatles on Sgt. Pepper, while Doggett argues that "Rubber Band" and "With a Little Help from My Friends" both feature lyrical gags about performing "out of tune". Regarding the blend of folk, pop and classical, Perone argues that the Moody Blues' Days of Future Passed, also released by Deram in 1967, was more commercially viable but displayed the combination on David Bowie, particularly on "Rubber Band" and "Sell Me a Coat". Bowie also utilized the same sound effects as the Bonzo Dog Doo-Dah Band's debut single "My Brother Makes the Noises for the Talkies" for David Bowie's "We Are Hungry Men", "Please Mr. Gravedigger" and the outtake "Toy Soldier".

Commentators have recognised themes on David Bowie that informed the artist's later works, such as the self-styled messiah of "We Are Hungry Men". Perone argues that the track anticipated the post-punk and new wave styles of the late 1970s, naming Talking Heads' first and second albums. The folk of "Come and Buy My Toys" also anticipated Bowie's exploration of the genre on his 1969 second self-titled album, while Doggett finds the sense of desperation on "Rubber Band" foreshadowed the Station to Station and "Heroes" LPs of 1976 and 1977, respectively. Others found the gender-bending themes of "She's Got Medals" foreshadowed 1971's "Queen Bitch" and 1974's "Rebel Rebel".

=== Later reviews ===
Professional ratings
Review scores
Source	Rating
AllMusic	4/5 stars
Blender	1/5 stars
Encyclopedia of Popular Music	2/5 stars
Mojo	3/5 stars
Rolling Stone	2/5 stars
The Rolling Stone Album Guide	2/5 stars
Uncut	7/10

Retrospective reviews of David Bowie have unfavourably compared the LP with the artist's later works, although some have recognised it positively in its own terms. Pegg summarises: David Bowie justifiably resides in the shadow of [Bowie's] later work, but those with open ears and open minds know it as a sweet, clever album that has borne decades of derision with consummate dignity."

Writing for AllMusic, Dave Thompson called the LP "an intriguing collection, as much in its own right as for the light it sheds on Bowie's future career" and concluded that "though this material has been repackaged with such mind-numbing frequency as to seem all but irrelevant today, David Bowie still remains a remarkable piece of work. And it sounds less like anything else he's ever done than any subsequent record in his catalog". The same publication's Stephen Thomas Erlewine saw it as "a fascinating, highly enjoyable debut" on its own merits. Reviewing in 2010, BBC Music's Sean Egan found an "unrefined" talent in Bowie, noting "above average" lyrics that are "hardly deep". Nevertheless, he praised Bowie's commitment to the project, concluding that "David Bowie is hardly an essential listen but historically interesting as unmistakably the entrée of someone with a future." In 2017, Dave Swanson of Ultimate Classic Rock found the music joyful, but felt the record was out of place with the music industry at the time, which mostly contributed to its failure.

Bowie's biographers have held mixed opinions on David Bowie. NME critics Roy Carr and Charles Shaar Murray said, "a listener strictly accustomed to David Bowie in his assorted '70s guises would probably find this debut album either shocking or else simply quaint", while Buckley describes its status in Bowie's discography as "the vinyl equivalent of the madwoman in the attic", ridiculing it as a "cringe-inducing piece of juvenilia" only to be braved by "those with a high enough embarrassment threshold". Perone felt the wide variety of musical styles were displayed "generally to good effect". Trynka praises Bowie's confidence and highlights individual tracks, such as "We Are Hungry Men" and "Uncle Arthur", but notes that he lacked ambition and commerciality at the time. Doggett similarly contends that its "whimsical character studies" stood against the "psychedelic ambiance" of the era.

In a 2016 list ranking Bowie's studio albums from worst to best, Bryan Wawzenek of Ultimate Classic Rock placed David Bowie at number 23 (out of 26), criticising Bowie's vocal performances, lyrics and overall sound that lacks "wit and energy". Including Bowie's two albums with Tin Machine, the writers of Consequence of Sound ranked David Bowie number 26 (out of 28) in their 2018 list. Goble called it "an awkward artifact", representing signs of what was to come for the artist but as a standalone album, it remains "not essential".

== Reissues and compilations ==
Professional ratings
Deluxe edition
Review scores
Source	Rating
Classic Rock	7/10 stars
The Guardian	3/5 stars
Record Collector	3/5 stars
Rolling Stone	3/5 stars

Bowie's Deram recordings have been recycled in a multitude of compilation albums, including The World of David Bowie (1970), Images 1966–1967 (1973), Another Face (1981), Rock Reflections (1990), and The Deram Anthology 1966–1968 (1997).

Deram first reissued David Bowie on LP in August 1984, followed by a CD release in April 1989. In January 2010, Deram and Universal Music reissued the album in a remastered two-disc deluxe edition package. Containing 53 total tracks, the collection compiles both the original mono and stereo mixes, Bowie's other Deram recordings, such as "The London Boys" and "The Laughing Gnome", single mixes, previously unreleased stereo mixes, alternate takes and for the first time, Bowie's first BBC radio session (Top Gear, December 1967). The tracks were remastered by Peter Mew and Tris Penna, who previously undertook Virgin's deluxe reissue of David Bowie (1969). Penna stated in the deluxe edition liner notes that they wanted "to ensure [the tracks] sounded as good, if not better, than when they were first released".

Reviewing the deluxe edition for The Second Disc, Joe Marchese considered it a welcome supplement to The Deram Anthology 1966–1968 that showed Bowie had talent but lacked direction. He concluded that the set allows listeners to reexamine David Bowie and "makes the best possible case for this 'lost era' of Bowie history". Pegg similarly called the set "excellent". Barry Walters of Rolling Stone described the collection as an "early portrait of pop's ultimate shape-shifter". Erlewine praised the addition of the new tracks, arguing that they enhance the debut rather than diminish it, fully offering more insight into Bowie's talent at this stage of his career. More unfavourably, Egan felt the collection was "comprehensive" but "aesthetically too much even if the parent album was the greatest ever made".

== Track listing ==
All tracks are written by David Bowie.

Side one

1. "Uncle Arthur" – 2:07
2. "Sell Me a Coat" – 2:58
3. "Rubber Band" – 2:17
4. "Love You till Tuesday" – 3:09
5. "There Is a Happy Land" – 3:11
6. "We Are Hungry Men" – 2:58
7. "When I Live My Dream" – 3:22

Side two

1. "Little Bombardier" – 3:24
2. "Silly Boy Blue" – 3:48
3. "Come and Buy My Toys" – 2:07
4. "Join the Gang" – 2:17
5. "She's Got Medals" – 2:23
6. "Maid of Bond Street" – 1:43
7. "Please Mr. Gravedigger" – 2:35

Notes

- The LP was released in mono and stereo in the UK. Mono editions use slightly different mixes of "Uncle Arthur" and "Please Mr. Gravedigger". The American release omits "We Are Hungry Men" and "Maid of Bond Street".

== Personnel ==
Sources:

- David Bowie – vocals, guitar, arrangements
- Big Jim Sullivan – guitar, banjo, sitar (11)
- John Renbourn – acoustic guitar (1, 2, 4–7, 10, 12)
- Derek Boyes – organ
- Derek "Dek" Fearnley – bass, arrangements
- John Eager – drums
- Marion Constable – backing vocals (9)
- Arthur Greenslade – arrangements (3, 4, 7)

Technical

- Mike Vernon – producer
- Gus Dudgeon – engineer
- Gerald Fearnley – cover photography
