= Rubber Band (song) =

Song by David Bowie

Single by David Bowie
- B-side: "The London Boys"
- Released: 2 December 1966
- Recorded: 18 October 1966
- Studio: RG Jones, London
- Genre: Baroque pop
- Length: 2:05
- Label: Deram
- Songwriter: David Bowie
- Producers: David Bowie and Dek Fearnley

David Bowie singles chronology
| "I Dig Everything" (1966) | "Rubber Band" (1966) | "The Laughing Gnome" (1967) |

"Rubber Band" is a song by the English singer-songwriter David Bowie. It was recorded in October 1966 following Bowie's dismissal from Pye Records and helped secure him a record contract with Decca-subsidiary Deram Records, who released it as a single in the United Kingdom on 2 December of the same year. A departure from the mod-style sound of his previous releases, "Rubber Band" displays a style informed by vaudeville and British music hall – influenced particularly by British actor Anthony Newley. The lyrics tell the story of a man who goes off to war and, upon his return, finds his lover fell for a brass band conductor.

Like his other early singles, "Rubber Band" failed to chart. Nevertheless, Bowie's biographers note that the track represents a creative leap in the artist's songwriting. The song was re-recorded in February 1967 for Bowie's first full-length album, David Bowie (1967). Produced by Mike Vernon, the remake has a slower tempo and a varied vocal performance from Bowie. London Records issued the remake as a single in the United States on 27 May 1967. Both versions have since appeared on various compilation albums.

== Background and recording ==
Following a string of singles that failed to chart, David Bowie was let go from Pye Records in September 1966. In order to secure him a new record contract, his soon-to-be manager Kenneth Pitt financed a recording session the next month at London's R G Jones Studio. On 18 October, Bowie and his backing band the Buzz, recorded a new version of "The London Boys", along with two new songs "Rubber Band" and "The Gravedigger" (later retitled "Please Mr. Gravedigger"). Joining them for the session were trumpeter Chick Norton and, for the tuba and oboe, two now unknown musicians. However, the band were inexperienced with the song arrangements and had to be assisted by the other musicians to complete the session. Buzz member Dek Fearnley, who co-produced the session with Bowie, later said in 1991: "We'd worked out what kind of sound we wanted and had painstakingly written out the notation, but all the timings were wrong. Luckily the musicians interpreted what we had written and we got through it."

Two days after the session, Pitt showed the tape of "Rubber Band" to the promotional head of Decca Records, Tony Hall, who was impressed: "I must say I did flip. This guy had such a different sound, such a different approach," stating in 1983. Four days later on 24 October, Pitt showed the remaining tracks to Decca's A&R manager Hugh Mendl and in-house producer Mike Vernon, who were also impressed, signing Bowie to the label's progressive pop subsidiary Deram Records. Biographer Chris O'Leary summarises: "Financed by Pitt, the "Rubber Band" single landed Bowie an album deal with Deram, a newly founded Decca subsidiary label. As Decca chairman Sir Edward Lewis regarded rock as one would a permanent rash, Deram aimed to give rock a pedigree, offering 'exotic' pop singles and 'conceptual' albums."

== Composition ==
A departure from the mod-style of his previous singles, "Rubber Band" presents a new direction influenced by Bowie's newfound infatuation with English musical theater actor Anthony Newley; Bowie had first discovered him through the BBC serial The Strange World of Gurney Slade (1960). When asked about the separation between rock stars and himself, Newley stated that "I could afford to be silly and they couldn't. The whole rock 'n' roll thing was so desperately serious." According to O'Leary, Bowie felt he had taken himself too seriously up to that point in his career and looked to Newley, along with songwriters Lionel Bart and Alan Klein, for a new direction to take his career. Additionally, Bowie found the musical landscape changing in 1966, moving away from London-based mod music to California-based psychedelia. As it changed, Bowie followed suit, using Klein's vaudeville group as the basis for "Rubber Band".

Musically, "Rubber Band" is compared by James Perone to the march-style brass band works of conductor John Philip Sousa. NME editors Roy Carr and Charles Shaar Murray see the song as an "early manifestation of the Edwardian fixation that affected the more whimsical areas of mid-60's Brit[ish] pop". Other artists exploring Edwardian influences during the era included the Kinks on Arthur (Or the Decline and Fall of the British Empire) (1969) and the Beatles on Sgt. Pepper's Lonely Hearts Club Band (1967). Utilising various tempo and arrangement changes, the track starts on A minor in its opening verses before changing to B minor in the trumpet solo, C♯ minor in the last verse and E♭ minor in the coda.

Lyrically, "Rubber Band" tells the story of a man who goes off to war and, upon his return, finds that his lover fell for a brass band conductor. Bowie imitates Newley in his vocal performance. According to O'Leary, Bowie used his grandfather Jimmy Burns for inspiration, although this is disputed by Nicholas Pegg. Pegg states that the lyric's "library gardens", where Bowie would perform in 1969, are located in Bromley.

== Release and reception ==
Deram issued "Rubber Band", backed by "The London Boys", as a single in the United Kingdom on 2 December 1966, with the catalogue number Deram DM107. It was accompanied by a Decca press release that stated that the single was "a love story without a happy ending, it is a pathos set to tubas ... There's a neat off-beat approach to the lyrics that touch on such topics as garden tea parties, waxed moustaches and the First World War. Yet the underlying sentiment reflects the ideals and humour of this London-born singer." The single attracted the attention of the British magazine Disc, who wrote at the time:

I do not think "Rubber Band" is a hit. What it is is an example of how David Bowie has progressed himself into being a name to reckon with, certainly as far as songwriting is concerned. He is not the David Bowie we once knew. Even a different voice – distinctly reminiscent of a young Tony Newley – has emerged. Listen to this record then turn it over and listen to "The London Boys", which I think would have been a much more impressive topside. But both are worth thinking about.

As Disc foretold, "Rubber Band" was a flop, failing to enter the UK charts. Additionally, the single's failure immediately turned the relationship between Bowie and Decca sour. When the track was presented to Decca during their weekly meetings, the label were displeased. Mendl recalled in 2002: "It all went wrong for David at the first Decca A&R meeting. I was personally very excited about David's first single, but when it was played [back], someone said, 'Sounds like Tony Newley to me'. From the start, that sealed David's fate at Decca." The single's release also marked the breakup of the Buzz at the insistence of Bowie's then-manager Ralph Horton. As Bowie had already begun recording what would become his first full-length album, Horton wanted Bowie strictly as a solo artist. Bowie's final performance with the Buzz was the same day the single was issued, 2 December 1966.

Bowie's biographers note that "Rubber Band" represents a creative leap in the artist's songwriting. Pegg states: "There's a dramatic drive in the melodic as well as the lyrical narrative." Perone similarly states that while the song was bound to face little commercial success at the time, for the 19-year-old Bowie, the song "represents a remarkable achievement" and "sets the stage for the role-playing that would mark the great David Bowie work of the early 1970s." Nevertheless, Carr and Murray gave mixed assessments regarding Bowie's change in musical direction, writing: "The faintly ludicrous melodrama of Bowie's vocal delivery is counterpointed by the elephantine caperings of the tuba and cornet." In a 2016 list ranking every Bowie single from worst to best, Ultimate Classic Rock placed "Rubber Band" at number 113 (out of 119).

== David Bowie version ==
"Rubber Band"

Song by David Bowie

from the album David Bowie
- Released: 1 June 1967
- Recorded: 25 February 1967
- Studio: Decca, London
- Genre: Baroque pop
- Length: 2:17
- Label: Deram
- Songwriter: David Bowie
- Producer: Mike Vernon

"Rubber Band" was re-recorded on 25 February 1967 at Decca Studio 2 in London during the sessions for David Bowie. This new version, produced by Mike Vernon and engineered by Gus Dudgeon, boasted a new arrangement by Arthur Greenslade. Unlike the single version, which was mixed only in mono, the new version was recorded in stereo and released in both formats.

The David Bowie version is slower in tempo, thus running 20 seconds longer despite having the same number of bars. Bowie also used a different vocal style than the original, using more upper octaves rather than both upper and lower. The date mentioned in the lyrics was also changed, from 1912 to 1910. O'Leary finds the album arrangement superior to the single version: "The brass [are] more smoothly intoned their notes and John Eager's drums were a more eager participant." Pegg similarly considers the remake superior to the original, but Perone finds it inferior.

David Bowie was issued by Deram in the United Kingdom on 1 June 1967. The remake of "Rubber Band" was sequenced as the third track on side one of the original LP. London Records issued the remake as a promotional single in the United States on 27 May 1967, with album track "There Is a Happy Land" chosen as the B-side. All three versions of the song – the original single in mono, and the album version in stereo and mono – are available on the remastered 2010 deluxe edition of David Bowie issued in 2010.

The remake of "Rubber Band" was featured in the Love You till Tuesday film in 1969. It appears in a sequence depicting Bowie moustachioed up and dressed in a blazer and boater at an imaginary bandstand concert. O'Leary says that by the time the track appeared in the film, it was "a private joke indulged, a parody of a soured novelty song".

== Personnel ==
According to Chris O'Leary:

Single version

- David Bowie – vocals, producer
- Derek Boyes – organ
- Dek Fearnley – bass, producer
- John Eager – drums
- Chick Norton – trumpet
- Unknown musicians – tuba and oboe

Album version

- David Bowie – vocals
- Derek Boyes – organ
- Dek Fearnley – bass
- John Eager – drums
- Unknown musicians – tuba, trumpet, oboe
- Arthur Greenslade – arranger
- Mike Vernon – producer
- Gus Dudgeon – engineer

== Other releases ==
- "Rubber Band" also appears on a number of compilations, including:
  - The World of David Bowie (1970) – stereo album version
  - Images 1966–1967 (1973) – stereo album version
  - Another Face (1981) – single version
  - Love You till Tuesday LP (1984) – single version
  - The Collection (1985) – single version
  - Love You till Tuesday CD (1992) – stereo album version
  - The Deram Anthology 1966–1968 (1997) – single and stereo album versions
