= Love You till Tuesday (film) =

1969 promotional film by David Bowie

Video by David Bowie
- Released: May 1984
- Recorded: 26 January – 7 February 1969
- Length: 28 minutes
- Label: Polygram
- Director: Malcolm J Thomson

David Bowie chronology
Love You till Tuesday (1984)	Serious Moonlight (1984)

Love You till Tuesday is a promotional film made in 1969, designed to showcase the talents of a 22-year-old David Bowie. It was an attempt by Bowie's manager, Kenneth Pitt, to bring Bowie to a wider audience. Pitt had undertaken the film after a suggestion by Günther Schneider, producer of German TV show 4-3-2-1 Musik Für Junge Leute for the ZDF network. The film ended up being shelved, and was not released until 1984, when it finally came out on VHS. A DVD version was released in the UK in 2005.

== Production ==
Pitt hired his friend Malcolm J Thomson to direct the half-hour film, which was originally planned to showcase seven of Bowie's songs, including four from his 1967 debut album (three of them newly re-recorded for the film), plus the follow-up single "Let Me Sleep Beside You" and new compositions "When I'm Five" and "Ching-a-Ling". It would also include a mime piece performed and narrated by Bowie, The Mask. Before shooting started on 26 January 1969, Bowie added another new song to the planned film—"Space Oddity". His girlfriend at the time, Hermione Farthingale, and his friend John Hutchinson also performed in the movie (billed as Hermione and Hutch) and sang lead vocals on "Ching-a-Ling" with Bowie singing backup. Bowie himself wore a wig throughout the shoot, having cut his hair to army regulation length to audition for The Virgin Soldiers film, based on the same name novel by Leslie Thomas. German language versions of three songs (Love You Til Tuesday as Lieb' Dich bis Dienstag, and Did You Ever Have a Dream as Mit mir in Deinem Traum, while the third song is unknown), and the narration for the mime sequence, were also recorded. Filming was finished by 7 February 1969.

The film was considerably more costly than Pitt had anticipated, and he clashed with Thomson, who wanted to make the "Space Oddity" segment (featuring Bowie playing both 'Ground Control' and 'Major Tom', with the latter becoming seduced by space maidens) considerably more risqué. The film failed to interest any buyers, however, and Schneider had left ZDF. Pitt shelved the results, and would continue to be Bowie's manager until 1971.

In 1984, with Bowie's global fame at an apex, the growing success of home video led Pitt to contact Polygram, who released the film on VHS in May of that year. Deram issued a 'soundtrack' compilation in the same month.

The film was released on Laserdisc in the US in 1990 and on DVD in the UK in 2005.

== Performances ==
1. "Love You till Tuesday"
2. "Sell Me a Coat"
3. "When I'm Five"
4. "Rubber Band"
5. "The Mask (A Mime)"
6. "Let Me Sleep Beside You"
7. "Ching-a-Ling"
8. "Space Oddity"
9. "When I Live My Dream"
