= Love You till Tuesday (song) =

Song by David Bowie

Song by David Bowie

from the album David Bowie
- Released: 1 June 1967
- Recorded: 25 February 1967
- Studio: Decca, London
- Genre: Pop
- Length: 3:09
- Label: Deram
- Songwriter: David Bowie
- Producer: Mike Vernon

"Love You till Tuesday" is a song written and performed by the English singer David Bowie. The first version of the song, recorded in February 1967, was included on Bowie's debut studio album. A second version, released as a single, was recorded on 3 June 1967 and released on 14 July 1967. The single garnered good notices from the music press but, like his earlier singles, failed to break into the British charts. It was his final new release for Deram Records.

Bowie's 1969 showpiece film Love You till Tuesday took its name from the song, which featured over the opening credits.

== Album version ==
David Bowie wrote "Love You till Tuesday" as a late addition to his self-titled debut album. It was recorded on 25 February 1967 at Decca Studio 2 in London, with production by Mike Vernon and Gus Dudgeon engineering. The recording featured the members of Bowie's former backing band the Buzz—Derek Boyes, Dec Fearnley and John Eager—guitarist John Renbourn and various unknown studio musicians hired by Vernon for orchestral backing.

"Love You till Tuesday" is a pop song that is one of multiple on the album that displays an influence of British performer Anthony Newley. Author James Perone finds Bowie's accent exemplifies the "Englishness" of the song, comparing it to the sound of Herman's Hermits, while Chris O'Leary draws comparisons to singer-songwriter Alan Klein, particularly his song "Will You Ever Come Back Again?".

Deram Records issued David Bowie in the United Kingdom on 1 June 1967, with "Love You till Tuesday" sequenced as the fourth track on side one of the original LP, between the remake of "Rubber Band" and "There Is a Happy Land". The album flopped, in part due to a lack of promotion from Deram.

== Single version ==
"Love You till Tuesday"
- Dutch picture sleeve

Single by David Bowie
- B-side: "Did You Ever Have a Dream"
- Released: 14 July 1967
- Recorded: 3 June 1967
- Studio: Decca, London
- Genre: Pop
- Length: 2:59
- Label: Deram
- Songwriter: David Bowie
- Producer: Mike Vernon

David Bowie singles chronology
"The Laughing Gnome" (1967)	"Love You till Tuesday" (1967)	"Space Oddity" (1969)

Two days after the release of David Bowie on 3 June 1967, Bowie re-recorded "Love You till Tuesday" for release as a single. Boasting a new vocal, a string arrangement by Ivor Raymonde and an excerpt of "Hearts and Flowers" from Czibulka's Winter Marching, Deram issued the single version on 14 July 1967, backed by the newly-recorded "Did You Have a Dream?", with the catalogue number DM135. It was a flop despite earning Bowie his best critical reviews up to that point. Record Retailer called it a "mature and stylish performance which could easily make it", while Record Mirror commented that "This boy really is something different ... I reckon it's a stand-out single. Liked it; recommend it."

In Disc, Music & Echo, Penny Valentine stated that "This is a very funny rather bitter little love song about how he'll always love her – at least for four days. His incredible sense of timing and humour come over perfectly in this record. It would be nice if more people appreciated him." Meanwhile, Melody Maker's Chris Welch hailed Bowie as "one of the few really original solo singers operating in the theatre of British pop ... Very funny, and deserves instant recognition." However, Bowie influence and Pink Floyd co-founder Syd Barrett was less positive, telling Melody Maker in July 1967, "Yeah, it's a joke number. Jokes are good... I think people will like the bit about it being Monday, when in fact it was Tuesday. Very chirpy, but I don't think my toes were tapping at all."

The single appeared in America on 28 August and likewise received critical appraisal. Cash Box praised the "orchestrations packed with zest, a delivery with all the punch of an on-stage pub performance, and some wild lyrics." After its release, Bowie recorded other tracks for release as singles, all of which were rejected by the label, leading to his departure in May 1968. As a result, "Love You till Tuesday" was Bowie's last release for Deram.

== Aftermath ==
Bowie performed the song on Dutch TV's Fenkleur on 8 November 1967 and again the following month for his first BBC radio session on 18 December; this version appears on the 2010 deluxe edition of David Bowie. On 27 February 1968, he performed it again for the German show 4-3-2-1 Musik Für Junge Leute and in the same period sang it during the London leg of Lindsay Kemp's mime production Pierrot In Turquoise. "Love You till Tuesday" provided the name for Bowie's 1969 promotional film, which was commissioned by his manager Kenneth Pitt as a way to introduce him to a larger audience. Appearing in the film's opening credits, Bowie mimed to the single version (minus the coda) against a white backdrop and donning a blue Ossie Clark suit. On 24 and 29 January 1969, Bowie recorded a German-language version of the song, titled "Lieb' Dich Bis Dienstag", for a proposed German version of the film. Recorded at London's Trident Studios and produced by Jonathan Weston, this version featured lyrics translated by Lisa Busch and a new vocal from Bowie against the single version's backing track. Writing in 2005, biographer David Buckley called this version "one of Bowie's silliest moments to date".

A 1966 demo version recorded by Bowie alone has circulated on bootlegs. This version contained a middle eight not present in the released versions, which reads: "I'm the coffee in your coffee [sic], the spoon in your tea / If you've got a problem then it's probably me / I'm hiding every place that you are." Authors Nicholas Pegg and Peter Doggett note that the line "like the sugar in your tea" also appears in Eartha Kitt's "Après Moi", a song that contains a spoken-word coda like "Love You till Tuesday"; "Après Moi" appeared on Kitt's Down to Eartha album alongside "The Day That the Circus Left Town", which he considered for his short-lived cabaret act in 1968.

== Personnel ==
According to Kevin Cann and Chris O'Leary:

Album version

- David Bowie – vocals, arranger
- John Renbourn – acoustic guitar
- Derek Boyes – piano
- Dek Fearnley – bass
- John Eager – drums
- Unknown musicians – vibraphone, trumpet, violins, violas, celli
- Arthur Greenslade – arranger

Technical

- Mike Vernon – producer
- Gus Dudgeon – engineer

Single version

- David Bowie – vocals
- Ivor Raymonde – arranger
- Unknown musicians – acoustic guitar, piano, bass, drums, flutes, clarinets, oboes, bassoons, violins, violas, celli

Technical

- Mike Vernon – producer
- Alan Price – engineer

== Charts ==
Chart (1967)	Peak position
Dutch 'Breakers'/Bubbling Under chart ("Tipparade")	18
