= The Laughing Gnome =

Song by David Bowie

- Cover of the 1967 Belgian single

Single by David Bowie
- B-side: "The Gospel According to Tony Day"
- Released: 14 April 1967
- Recorded: 26 January, 7 and 10 February, 8 March 1967
- Studio: Decca (London)
- Genre: Novelty
- Length: 3:03
- Label: Deram
- Songwriter: David Bowie
- Producer: Mike Vernon

David Bowie singles chronology
"Rubber Band" (1966)	"The Laughing Gnome" (1967)	"Love You Till Tuesday" (1967)

"The Laughing Gnome" is a song by the English singer David Bowie, released as a single on 14 April 1967. A pastiche of songs by one of Bowie's early influences, Anthony Newley, it was originally released as a novelty single on Deram Records in 1967. The track consists of Bowie meeting and conversing with a gnome, whose sped-up voice (created by Bowie and studio engineer Gus Dudgeon) delivers several puns on the word "gnome". At the time, "The Laughing Gnome" failed to provide Bowie with a chart placing, but on its re-release in 1973 it reached number six on the British charts and number three in New Zealand.

== Release and reception ==
The single was not a commercial success upon initial release in April 1967, despite a positive review in the NME, which declared it "A novelty number chock full of appeal. This boy sounds remarkably like Tony Newley, and he wrote this song himself. An amusing lyric, with David Bowie interchanging lines with a chipmunk-like creature." William Mann's 1967 review of Sgt. Pepper's Lonely Hearts Club Band compared that album's similar interest in music-hall and Victoriana influences to "The Laughing Gnome": "a heavy-handedly facetious number about a laughing gnome which ... steadfastly remained the flop it deserved to be". NME editors Roy Carr and Charles Shaar Murray later described it as "Undoubtedly the most embarrassing example of Bowie juvenilia". However, Bowie biographer David Buckley has called "The Laughing Gnome" a "supremely catchy children's song" and compared it to contemporary material by Pink Floyd's Syd Barrett, while Nicholas Pegg considered that "the world would be a duller place without it".

The song became a hit when reissued in 1973, in the wake of Bowie's commercial breakthrough The Rise and Fall of Ziggy Stardust and the Spiders from Mars and the US reissue of his 1969 hit "Space Oddity". Despite it being radically different from his material at the time, the single made No. 6 in the UK charts and was certified silver in the UK (250,000 copies sold), which according to Carr and Murray left Decca Records as "about the only unembarrassed party". A second reissue in 1982 was not as successful, failing to chart.

In 1990, Bowie announced that the set list for his "greatest hits" Sound+Vision Tour would be decided by telephone voting, and NME made a concerted effort to rig the voting so Bowie would have to perform "The Laughing Gnome" (with the slogan "Just Say Gnome"). The voting system was scrapped. Bowie later joked to NME's rival Melody Maker that he had been considering performing it in a new 'Velvet Underground-influenced' arrangement. He also considered performing it on his 2003 tour.

In 1999, Bowie appeared on the bi-annual Red Nose Day telethon for Comic Relief performing a tongue-in-cheek composition entitled "Requiem for the Laughing Gnome", a deliberately poor piece of music seen as a parody of the original release.

The mono single and its flip side were given a stereo remix in July 2009 at Abbey Road Studios for the 2010 double-disc "deluxe" package of Bowie's debut album. According to the sleeve notes, "The Laughing Gnome" was recorded at Decca Studios No. 2 on 26 January, 7 February and 10 February, and 8 March 1967.

The original 1967 record is considered collectable, with UK pressings in perfect condition being valued at £200 by Record Collector magazine's 2016 Rare Record Price Guide. In 2011, a Belgian demonstration pressing (also from 1967) sold for more than £2300.

== Track listing ==
1. "The Laughing Gnome" (Bowie) – 3:01
2. "The Gospel According to Tony Day" (Bowie) – 2:48

== Personnel ==
- David Bowie – vocals, guitar
- Derek Boyes – organ
- Gus Dudgeon – gnome vocal
- John Eager – drums
- Dek Fearnley – bass
- Peter Hampshire – guitar
- Mike Vernon – production

== Certifications ==
Certifications for "The Laughing Gnome"
Region	Certification	Certified units/sales
United Kingdom (BPI)	Silver	250,000^{^}
^{^} Shipments figures based on certification alone.
