= Kenneth Pitt =

British talent manager and publicist (1922–2019)

- Born: Kenneth Cooper Pitt; 10 November 1922; Uxbridge, Middlesex, England
- Died: 25 February 2019 (aged 96); Hertfordshire, England
- Occupations: Talent manager, publicist
- Known for: Manager of David Bowie, c.1965-1970

Kenneth Cooper Pitt (10 November 1922 – 25 February 2019) was a British publicist and talent manager, who managed the career of musicians including David Bowie in the late 1960s.

== Biography ==
Pitt was born in Uxbridge, Middlesex. In the 1950s, he was responsible for publicising American musicians and bands touring the UK, including Frank Sinatra, Duke Ellington, and Jerry Lee Lewis. His first venture into management was with Romani street singer Danny Purches, but he had more success in the early 1960s with the band Manfred Mann, whom he persuaded to record the Barry and Greenwich song "Do Wah Diddy Diddy". He also managed singer Crispian St. Peters and American group Goldie and the Gingerbreads.

In 1965, Pitt was approached by Ralph Horton with a view to co-managing singer David Jones, who had yet to change his name to David Bowie. Pitt agreed, and in early 1967 became Bowie's sole manager. Pitt ensured that Bowie recorded a wide range of music at that time, and on one occasion, after returning from a trip to the US, introduced Bowie to the debut album by the Velvet Underground. At the same time, he sought to find Bowie work in theatre and films, produced Bowie's promotional film Love You till Tuesday, and ensured that Bowie took part in two European song festivals, in Malta and Italy. Pitt managed Bowie at the time of his first hit, "Space Oddity" in 1969, but Bowie sacked him soon afterwards in favour of Tony DeFries.

Pitt gave up artist management at that time, remaining as a consultant to acts touring in the UK. He published a book, Bowie: The Pitt Report, in 1985.

Kenneth Pitt died at his home in Hertfordshire, England, on 25 February 2019, aged 96.
