= Nothing Has Changed =

- 3-CD deluxe edition

Compilation album by David Bowie
- Released: 18 November 2014
- Recorded: 1964–2014
- Genre: Rock
- Length: 153:54 (2-CD edition)
- Labels: Parlophone (UK); Columbia (US); Legacy (US)
- Producer: Various

David Bowie chronology
The Next Day (2013)	Nothing Has Changed (2014)	Five Years (1969–1973) (2015)

Alternative covers
- 2-CD Edition

Alternative cover
- Double LP version

Singles from Nothing Has Changed
- 1. "Sue (Or in a Season of Crime)" Released: 17 November 2014

Nothing Has Changed (stylised as Nothing has changed.) is a compilation album by the English musician David Bowie. It was released on 18 November 2014 through Parlophone in the United Kingdom, and Columbia Records and Legacy Recordings in the United States. The album was released in four formats: a triple CD version (sequenced in reverse chronological order), a double CD version (sequenced in chronological order), a double LP version, and a single CD version released exclusive to select countries.

It is the first album to showcase Bowie's entire career up to that point, from his first single "Liza Jane" in 1964 to "Sue (Or in a Season of Crime)", a new composition recorded specifically for the compilation. The different formats of the album all offer different tracks and mixes compared to the others. The three-disc version includes the most, such as songs from Bowie's unreleased 2001 album Toy. The collection also contains numerous discrepancies in its track listings. Its title comes from a lyric in the song "Sunday" from Bowie's 2002 album Heathen. Each of the different formats feature different cover artworks, all designed by Jonathan Barnbrook and all depicting Bowie examining himself in a mirror.

Upon its release, the album debuted at number nine in the UK, becoming Bowie's 29th top 10 album. Following Bowie's death in 2016, it went on to peak at number five in the UK and charted in other countries. It has been certified Gold by the British Phonographic Industry (BPI) in the UK. The three-disc version of Nothing Has Changed received critical acclaim, with many praising its reverse sequencing as offering a different way to enjoy the artist's career. However, it attracted criticism for its exclusion of Bowie's Tin Machine period, as well as its under-representation of the Berlin Trilogy (1977–1979). Nevertheless, it is considered one of Bowie's best compilation albums.

A revised version of the two-disc Nothing Has Changed, re-titled Legacy, was released on 11 November 2016 and includes selections from his final album Blackstar (2016).

== Background and content ==
On 9 September 2014, an announcement was posted on Bowie's website and Facebook page: "It is with much pleasure that we can exclusively announce a career-spanning collection of Bowie's music covering fifty years of recorded works from his 1964 debut, 'Liza Jane', through to a brand new recording made this year. Nothing Has Changed compiles tracks from every period of Bowie's career and features new single; 'Sue (Or in a Season of Crime)', which was specially recorded for the compilation with long-term collaborator Tony Visconti." The album's title comes from a lyric in the song "Sunday" from Bowie's 2002 album Heathen.

The different formats of Nothing Has Changed all offer different tracks and mixes compared to the others. The three-disc version includes songs from Bowie's unreleased 2001 album Toy: "Your Turn to Drive", previously a download-only single, and a previously unreleased re-recorded version of "Let Me Sleep Beside You", as well as the 2003 Ken Scott mix of "Life on Mars?", the 2007 Tony Visconti mix single edit of "Young Americans", the 2010 Harry Maslin mix of "Wild is the Wind", the stereo mix of "All the Young Dudes", and the 4:08 radio edit of "Love Is Lost (Hello Steve Reich mix)" (the last two of which are also included on the two-disc version). All formats contain what biographer Nicholas Pegg calls the "loud" single mix of "Starman", while the one- and two-disc versions contains the 4:46 promotional edit of "Absolute Beginners".

However, the compilation also contains numerous discrepancies in its track listings. The 'UK stereo mix' of "Space Oddity" found on the vinyl and one-disc versions is actually a new edit sourced from the 2015 remaster (Pegg also notes that the song was recorded in mono). The version of "Diamond Dogs" is a new edit containing both a fade-in and an early fade-out, while "Ziggy Stardust" edits out the final guitar notes. The track listed as "Fashion (single version)" is not in fact the original single edit and has been incorrectly re-edited. The versions of "Under Pressure", "Dancing in the Street" and "Buddha of Suburbia" are the original single versions but are not listed as such. "Silly Boy Blue", track 18 on disc 3, is incorrectly listed as being from David Bowie (1969) but is actually from his previous self-titled album, David Bowie (1967). Pegg further notes that Bowie's Tin Machine period is completely absent from the compilation, his Berlin Trilogy is only represented by one track per album, and there is a huge absence of live recordings.

== Release ==
Nothing Has Changed was released on 18 November 2014 through Parlophone in the United Kingdom, and Columbia Records and Legacy Recordings in the United States. The album was released in four formats: a triple CD version (sequenced in reverse chronological order), a double CD version (sequenced in chronological order), a double LP version, and a single CD version released exclusive to select countries.

The album's multiple cover artworks were designed by Jonathan Barnbrook, who previously designed the artworks for Heathen (2002), Reality (2003) and The Next Day (2013), and would do the same for Blackstar (2016). Each format received a different image, all selected from shots of Bowie taken throughout his life depicting him studying himself in a mirror.

A revised version of the two-disc Nothing Has Changed, re-titled Bowie Legacy, was released on 11 November 2016 and includes selections from Blackstar. (Note: Compared to the two-disc version Nothing Has Changed, the track list of Bowie Legacy is revised as follows: In place of "Love Is Lost" and "Sue (Or in a Season of Crime)", the Blackstar songs "Lazarus" and "I Can't Give Everything Away" are included, as well as the radio edit of "Slow Burn" (which also appears on the three-disc version of Nothing Has Changed). Additionally, a previously-unreleased mix of "Life on Mars?" is present instead of the original version from Hunky Dory.)

== Commercial performance ==
Nothing Has Changed entered the official UK Albums Chart at number nine upon its release, becoming Bowie's 29th UK Top 10 album, although it quickly fell out of the Top 30. Despite having four more separate successive runs in the Top 100 during 2015, it never got any higher than number 40.

On 15 January 2016, the album re-entered the chart at a new peak of number five, after the news of Bowie's death earlier that week. Two weeks later, Nothing Has Changed remained at number five on 29 January, in a week which saw four other Bowie albums in the top 10, making him the first artist to achieve five simultaneous UK top 10 albums since Michael Jackson, who achieved six in July 2009 after his own death, and a total of twelve in the top 40. This meant he equalled the record set by Elvis Presley after his death in 1977. Nothing Has Changed also gained new peaks worldwide in countries where it had never made the top 10, rising to number one in New Zealand (where it spent four weeks), number three in Australia, number four in Austria and Germany, and number five in Switzerland. It also rose into the top 10 in Belgium, Hungary, Italy and the Netherlands.

== Critical reception ==
Professional ratings
Aggregate scores
Source	Rating
Metacritic	86/100
Review scores
Source	Rating
AllMusic	4.5/5 stars
Magnet	3.5/5 stars
Drowned in Sound	4/5 stars
Pitchfork	8.8/10
Mojo	4/5 stars
Under the Radar	9/10 stars
Q	4/5 stars
PopMatters	8/10 stars
Classic Rock	4.5/5 stars
American Songwriter	4/5 stars

Nothing Has Changed, particularly the three-disc version, received critical acclaim. Critics gave unanimous praise to its reverse chronological sequencing. Writing for AllMusic, Stephen Thomas Erlewine stated, "it's a sly way to revisit and recontextualise a career that has been compiled many, many times before." Evan Sawdey of PopMatters agreed, writing that the sequencing of the three-disc version creates "a fascinating aural experience", giving the listener a sense of Bowie's "out-there weirdness" early on, as well as a taste of the artist's influences. Similarly, Cody Ray Shafer of Under the Radar praised the sequencing of the three-disc version, finding that this allows the listener to appreciate the artist in an entirely different way. Shafer further praised the new track "Sue", writing that it is "remarkably unlike anything he's ever done before."

Many have considered the three-disc version one of Bowie's finest compilations, including Erlewine, who praised it as "[an album] that makes us hear an artist we know well in a whole new way." Andrzej Lukowski of Drowned in Sound further called it, "a monument to an extraordinary 50-year-career" and "a statement of self-belief in Bowie's post-superstardom work that surely stands as the most pugnacious best of ever released by an artist of his stature." Similarly, Sawday called Nothing Has Changed "a thrilling go-to for the semi-casual Thin White Duke observer, and is about as damn close to perfect as a Bowie anthology can get." Hal Horowitz of American Songwriter found the three-disc version to be the best way for a new or unfamiliar listener to start with the artist, as well as for established listeners to catch up on his most recent period with The Next Day. A writer for Classic Rock magazine found the collection to be "a great way of refreshing an often overly familiar catalogue." Douglas Wolk of Pitchfork felt out of all the released formats, the three-disc version was the "jewel". He criticised the two-disc version as a slight revision of 2002's Best of Bowie, further stating "it...misses most of what's magical about this particular artist;" he considered the double LP version an improvement.

Despite its acclaim, the collection was criticised for excluding tracks Bowie recorded with the rock band Tin Machine. Holowitz stated, "It's a logical omission but still a segment of his oeuvre that deserves at least a nod." Lukowski felt that the absence of Tin Machine was the collection's "only real fault". Wolk was further disappointed with the absence of tracks such as "Suffragette City", "D.J." and "John, I'm Only Dancing". Some reviewers agreed that certain eras of Bowie's career, including the Berlin Trilogy, were under-represented. Sawdey believed the lack of more Berlin tracks was a disappointment, especially when compared to including rarities from the then-unreleased Toy project. Erlewine also felt the Ziggy Stardust years were under-represented. Both Wolk and Horowitz also criticised the inclusion of the collaboration "Dancing in the Street". Some reviewers found the collection's title ironic, as throughout Bowie's long career, everything changed.

== Track listings ==
All songs written by David Bowie, except where noted.

=== 2-CD edition ===
Disc one
No.	Title	Writer(s)	Place of origin	Length
1.	"Space Oddity"		David Bowie (1969)	5:14
2.	"The Man Who Sold the World"		The Man Who Sold the World	3:57
3.	"Changes"		Hunky Dory	3:35
4.	"Oh! You Pretty Things"		Hunky Dory	3:12
5.	"Life on Mars?"		Hunky Dory	3:49
6.	"Starman" (original single mix)		The Rise and Fall of Ziggy Stardust and the Spiders from Mars; single mix released a few months before the parent album's release	4:12
7.	"Ziggy Stardust"		The Rise and Fall of Ziggy Stardust and the Spiders from Mars	3:12
8.	"Moonage Daydream"		The Rise and Fall of Ziggy Stardust and the Spiders from Mars	4:39
9.	"The Jean Genie" (original single mix)		Aladdin Sane; single mix released in 1972	4:05
10.	"All the Young Dudes" (previously unreleased stereo mix given by Bowie to Mott the Hoople)		Recorded for Aladdin Sane and re-recorded/released on the Mott the Hoople album All the Young Dudes	3:08
11.	"Drive-In Saturday"		Aladdin Sane	4:30
12.	"Sorrow"	Bob Feldman, Jerry Goldstein, Richard Gottehrer	Pin Ups	2:53
13.	"Rebel Rebel"		Diamond Dogs	4:30
14.	"Young Americans" (original single edit)		Young Americans	3:13
15.	"Fame"	Bowie, John Lennon, Carlos Alomar	Young Americans	4:16
16.	"Golden Years" (single version)		Station to Station; single version released the year before	3:27
17.	"Sound and Vision"		Low	3:03
18.	"'Heroes'" (single version)	Bowie, Brian Eno	"Heroes"	3:33
19.	"Boys Keep Swinging"	Bowie, Eno	Lodger	3:17
20.	"Fashion" (single version)		Scary Monsters (and Super Creeps)	3:26
21.	"Ashes to Ashes" (single version)		Scary Monsters (and Super Creeps)	3:35

Disc two
No.	Title	Writer(s)	Place of Origin	Length
1.	"Under Pressure" (with Queen)	Bowie, John Deacon, Brian May, Freddie Mercury, Roger Taylor	Hot Space	4:08
2.	"Let's Dance" (single version)		Let's Dance	4:08
3.	"China Girl" (single version)	Bowie, Iggy Pop	Let's Dance	4:15
4.	"Modern Love" (single version)		Let's Dance	3:56
5.	"Blue Jean"		Tonight	3:11
6.	"This Is Not America" (with the Pat Metheny Group)	Bowie, Lyle Mays, Pat Metheny	The Falcon and the Snowman soundtrack	3:51
7.	"Dancing in the Street" (with Mick Jagger)	Marvin Gaye, William "Mickey" Stevenson, Ivy Jo Hunter	Non-album single	3:10
8.	"Absolute Beginners" (promotional edit)		Absolute Beginners soundtrack	4:46
9.	"Jump They Say"		Black Tie White Noise	3:54
10.	"Hallo Spaceboy" (Pet Shop Boys remix; with the Pet Shop Boys)	Bowie, Eno	Outside	4:25
11.	"Little Wonder" (single version)	Bowie, Reeves Gabrels, Mark Plati	Earthling	3:42
12.	"I'm Afraid of Americans" (V1 Trent Reznor remix) (radio edit)	Bowie, Eno	Earthling	4:25
13.	"Thursday's Child" (radio edit)	Bowie, Gabrels	'hours...'	4:26
14.	"Everyone Says 'Hi'"		Heathen	3:29
15.	"New Killer Star" (radio edit)		Reality (2003)	3:43
16.	"Love Is Lost" (edited version of the Hello Steve Reich mix by James Murphy for the DFA)		The Next Day Extra (2013)	4:07
17.	"Where Are We Now?"		The Next Day (2013)	4:09
18.	"Sue (Or in a Season of Crime)" (with the Maria Schneider Orchestra)	Bob Bhamra, Bowie, Maria Schneider, Paul Bateman	Full-length original single version	7:23

=== 3-CD deluxe edition ===
Disc one
No.	Title	Writer(s)	Place of origin	Length
1.	"Sue (Or in a Season of Crime)" (with the Maria Schneider Orchestra)	Bob Bhamra, Bowie, Maria Schneider, Paul Bateman	Full-length original single version	7:25
2.	"Where Are We Now?"		The Next Day	4:09
3.	"Love Is Lost" (edited version of the Hello Steve Reich mix by James Murphy for the DFA)		The Next Day Extra	4:07
4.	"The Stars (Are Out Tonight)"		The Next Day	3:57
5.	"New Killer Star" (radio edit)		Reality	3:43
6.	"Everyone Says 'Hi'" (edited version)		Heathen	3:29
7.	"Slow Burn" (radio edit)		Heathen	3:57
8.	"Let Me Sleep Beside You"		Previously unreleased, originally recorded in 2000 for the album Toy; original 1967 version was released on compilation album The World of David Bowie (1970) and the film Love You till Tuesday (1984)	3:11
9.	"Your Turn to Drive" (also known as "Toy (Your Turn to Drive)")		Free download to customers who ordered the Reality album online from HMV store in 2003, originally recorded for Toy	4:53
10.	"Shadow Man"		B-side on the single "Slow Burn" (2002), originally recorded for the Toy album; previous version recorded in 1971 and planned for inclusion in The Rise and Fall of Ziggy Stardust and the Spiders from Mars	4:45
11.	"Seven" (Marius de Vries mix)	Bowie, Reeves Gabrels	Hours	4:13
12.	"Survive" (Marius de Vries mix)	Bowie, Gabrels	Hours	4:17
13.	"Thursday's Child" (radio edit)	Bowie, Gabrels	Hours	4:26
14.	"I'm Afraid of Americans" (V1; radio edit)	Bowie, Brian Eno	Earthling	4:25
15.	"Little Wonder" (single version)	Bowie, Gabrels, Plati	Earthling	3:41
16.	"Hallo Spaceboy" (Pet Shop Boys remix; with the Pet Shop Boys)	Bowie, Eno	Originally from Outside; PSB mix released the following year	4:25
17.	"The Hearts Filthy Lesson" (radio edit)	Bowie, Eno, Gabrels, Mike Garson, Erdal Kızılçay, Sterling Campbell	Outside	3:34
18.	"Strangers When We Meet" (single version)		Outside; originally recorded for The Buddha of Suburbia (1993)	4:18

Disc two
No.	Title	Writer(s)	Place of origin	Length
1.	"The Buddha of Suburbia"		The Buddha of Suburbia	4:24
2.	"Jump They Say" (radio edit)		Black Tie White Noise	3:53
3.	"Time Will Crawl" (MM remix)		Originally from Never Let Me Down (1987); remix from iSelect (2008)	4:20
4.	"Absolute Beginners" (single version)		Absolute Beginners soundtrack	5:35
5.	"Dancing in the Street" (with Mick Jagger)	Marvin Gaye, William "Mickey" Stevenson, Ivy Jo Hunter	Non-album single for Live Aid	3:10
6.	"Loving the Alien" (single remix)		Originally from Tonight; remix from the following year	4:42
7.	"This Is Not America" (with the Pat Metheny Group)	Bowie, Mays, Metheny	The Falcon and the Snowman soundtrack	3:51
8.	"Blue Jean"		Tonight	3:11
9.	"Modern Love" (single version)		Let's Dance	3:56
10.	"China Girl" (single version)	Bowie, Osterberg	Let's Dance; originally from the Iggy Pop album The Idiot	4:15
11.	"Let's Dance" (single version)		Let's Dance	4:08
12.	"Fashion" (single version)		Scary Monsters (and Super Creeps)	3:26
13.	"Scary Monsters (And Super Creeps)" (single version)		Scary Monsters (and Super Creeps)	3:32
14.	"Ashes to Ashes" (single version)		Scary Monsters (and Super Creeps)	3:35
15.	"Under Pressure" (with Queen)	Bowie, John Deacon, Brian May, Freddie Mercury, Roger Taylor	Non-album single (1981); later released on the Queen album Hot Space	4:04
16.	"Boys Keep Swinging"	Bowie, Eno	Lodger	3:17
17.	"'Heroes'" (single version)	Bowie, Eno	"Heroes"	3:33
18.	"Sound and Vision"		Low	3:03
19.	"Golden Years" (single version)		Station to Station; single version released the year before	3:27
20.	"Wild Is the Wind" (2010 Harry Maslin mix)	Dimitri Tiomkin, Ned Washington	Station to Station	6:05

Disc three
No.	Title	Writer(s)	Place of origin	Length
1.	"Fame"	Bowie, John Lennon, Carlos Alomar	Young Americans	4:16
2.	"Young Americans" (2007 Tony Visconti mix of US single version)		Young Americans	3:10
3.	"Diamond Dogs"		Diamond Dogs	5:50
4.	"Rebel Rebel"		Diamond Dogs	4:30
5.	"Sorrow"	Bob Feldman, Jerry Goldstein, Richard Gottehrer	Pin Ups	2:53
6.	"Drive-In Saturday"		Aladdin Sane	4:30
7.	"All the Young Dudes" (previously unreleased stereo mix given by Bowie to Mott the Hoople)		Recorded in 1972 for Aladdin Sane and re-recorded/released in the same year on the Mott the Hoople album All the Young Dudes	3:08
8.	"The Jean Genie" (original single mix)		Originally from Aladdin Sane; single mix released in 1972	4:05
9.	"Moonage Daydream"		The Rise and Fall of Ziggy Stardust and the Spiders from Mars	4:39
10.	"Ziggy Stardust"		The Rise and Fall of Ziggy Stardust and the Spiders from Mars	3:12
11.	"Starman" (original single mix)		The Rise and Fall of Ziggy Stardust and the Spiders from Mars; single mix released a few months before the parent album's release	4:12
12.	"Life on Mars?" (2003 Ken Scott mix; exclusive to this edition)		Hunky Dory	3:48
13.	"Oh! You Pretty Things"		Hunky Dory	3:12
14.	"Changes"		Hunky Dory	3:35
15.	"The Man Who Sold the World"		The Man Who Sold the World	3:57
16.	"Space Oddity"		David Bowie (1969)	5:14
17.	"In the Heat of the Morning" (Stereo mix)		First released on compilation album The World of David Bowie (1970); recorded 1968	2:58
18.	"Silly Boy Blue"		Incorrectly listed as being from David Bowie (1969): it is from David Bowie (1967)	3:54
19.	"Can't Help Thinking About Me" (released under the name "David Bowie with the Lower Third")		Non-album single (1966)	2:43
20.	"You've Got a Habit of Leaving" (Davy Jones; released under the name "Davy Jones (& the Lower Third)")		Non-album single (1965)	2:29
21.	"Liza Jane" (released under the name "Davie Jones & The King Bees")	Leslie Conn	Non-album single (1964)	2:15

=== Double vinyl edition ===
Side one
No.	Title	Writer(s)	Place of origin	Length
1.	"Let's Dance" (single version)		Let's Dance	4:08
2.	"Ashes to Ashes" (single version)		Scary Monsters (and Super Creeps)	3:35
3.	"'Heroes'" (single version)	Bowie, Eno	"Heroes"	3:33
4.	"Changes"		Hunky Dory	3:35
5.	"Life on Mars?"		Hunky Dory	3:49

Side two
No.	Title	Place of origin	Length
6.	"Space Oddity"	David Bowie (1969)	5:14
7.	"Starman" (original single mix)	The Rise and Fall of Ziggy Stardust and the Spiders from Mars; single mix released a few months before the parent album's release	4:12
8.	"Ziggy Stardust"	The Rise and Fall of Ziggy Stardust and the Spiders from Mars	3:12
9.	"The Jean Genie" (original single mix)	Originally from Aladdin Sane; single mix released in 1972	4:05
10.	"Rebel Rebel"	Diamond Dogs	4:30

Side three
No.	Title	Writer(s)	Place of origin	Length
11.	"Golden Years" (single version)		Station to Station; single version released the year before	3:27
12.	"Fame"	Bowie, Lennon, Alomar	Young Americans	4:16
13.	"Sound and Vision"		Low	3:03
14.	"Under Pressure" (with Queen)	Bowie, Deacon, May, Mercury, Taylor	Non-album single later released on the Queen album Hot Space	4:08
15.	"Sue (Or in a Season of Crime)" (with the Maria Schneider Orchestra)	Bhamra, Bowie, Schneider, Bateman	Full-length original single version	7:23

Side four
No.	Title	Writer(s)	Place of origin	Length
16.	"Hallo Spaceboy" (Pet Shop Boys mix; with the Pet Shop Boys)	Bowie, Eno	Originally from Outside; PSB mix released the following year	4:25
17.	"China Girl" (single version)	Bowie, Osterburg (a.k.a. Pop)	Let's Dance; originally from the Iggy Pop album The Idiot	4:15
18.	"Modern Love" (single version)		Let's Dance	3:56
19.	"Absolute Beginners" (single version)		Absolute Beginners soundtrack	5:35
20.	"Where Are We Now?"		The Next Day	4:09

=== Single disc edition (exclusive to selected countries) ===
No.	Title	Writer(s)	Place of origin	Length
1.	"Let's Dance" (single version)		Let's Dance	4:08
2.	"Ashes to Ashes" (single version)		Scary Monsters (and Super Creeps)	3:35
3.	"Under Pressure" (with Queen)	Bowie, Deacon, May, Mercury, Taylor	Non-album single later released on the Queen album Hot Space	4:08
4.	""Heroes"" (single version)	Bowie, Eno	"Heroes"	3:35
5.	"Changes"		Hunky Dory	3:35
6.	"Space Oddity" (UK stereo single edit; exclusive to this edition)		David Bowie (1969)	4:33
7.	"Lady Stardust" (exclusive to Japan)		The Rise and Fall of Ziggy Stardust and the Spiders from Mars	3:20
8.	"Life on Mars?"		Hunky Dory	3:49
9.	"Starman" (original single mix)		The Rise and Fall of Ziggy Stardust and the Spiders from Mars; single mix released a few months before the parent album's release	4:12
10.	"Ziggy Stardust"		The Rise and Fall of Ziggy Stardust and the Spiders from Mars	3:12
11.	"The Jean Genie" (original single mix)		Originally from Aladdin Sane; single mix released in 1972	4:05
12.	"Rebel Rebel"		Diamond Dogs	4:30
13.	"Golden Years" (single version; exclusive to Argentina, Mexico and Australia)		Station to Station; single version released in the year before	3:27
14.	"Fame"	Bowie, Lennon, Alomar	Young Americans	4:16
15.	"Sound and Vision"		Low	3:03
16.	"Hallo Spaceboy" (Pet Shop Boys mix; with the Pet Shop Boys)	Bowie, Eno	Originally from Outside; PSB mix released the following year	4:25
17.	"China Girl" (single version)	Bowie, Pop	Let's Dance; originally from the Iggy Pop album The Idiot	4:15
18.	"Dancing in the Street" (with Mick Jagger)	Gaye, Stevenson, Hunter	Non-album single for Live Aid	3:11
19.	"Absolute Beginners" (U.S single version)		Absolute Beginners soundtrack	4:46
20.	"Where Are We Now?"		The Next Day	4:09
21.	"Sue (Or in a Season of Crime)" (radio edit; with the Maria Schneider Orchestra)	Bhamra, Bowie, Schneider, Bateman	Previously unreleased on CD	4:01

== Charts and certifications ==
=== Weekly charts ===
2014–16 weekly chart performance
Chart (2014–16)	Peak position
Australian Albums (ARIA)	3
Austrian Albums (Ö3 Austria)	4
Belgian Albums (Ultratop Flanders)	9
Belgian Albums (Ultratop Wallonia)	24
Canadian Albums (Billboard)	61
Czech Albums (ČNS IFPI)	9
Danish Albums (Hitlisten)	11
Dutch Albums (Album Top 100)	6
Finnish Albums (Suomen virallinen lista)	31
French Albums (SNEP)	11
German Albums (Offizielle Top 100)	4
Greek Albums (IFPI)	9
Hungarian Albums (MAHASZ)	7
Irish Albums (IRMA)	4
Italian Albums (FIMI)	6
Japanese Albums (Oricon)	35
New Zealand Albums (RMNZ)	1
Norwegian Albums (VG-lista)	14
Polish Albums (ZPAV)	49
Portuguese Albums (AFP)	5
Scottish Albums (Official Charts)	5
Spanish Albums (Promusicae)	11
Swedish Albums (Sverigetopplistan)	20
Swiss Albums (Schweizer Hitparade)	5
UK Albums (Official Charts)	5
US Billboard 200	57
US Top Alternative Albums (Billboard)	5
US Top Rock Albums (Billboard)	5

=== Year-end charts ===
2014 year-end chart performance
Chart (2014)	Position
Belgian Albums (Ultratop Flanders)	115

2016 year-end chart performance
Chart (2016)	Position
Australian Albums (ARIA)	15
Austrian Albums (Ö3 Austria)	61
Dutch Albums (MegaCharts)	83
German Albums (Offizielle Top 100)	77
Hungarian Albums (MAHASZ)	46
Italian Albums (FIMI)	53
New Zealand Albums (RMNZ)	4
Spanish Albums (PROMUSICAE)	76
Swiss Albums (Schweizer Hitparade)	81
UK Albums (OCC)	40

=== Certifications ===
Sales certifications for Nothing Has Changed
Region	Certification	Certified units/sales
Australia (ARIA)	Platinum	70,000^{^}
Belgium (BRMA)	Gold	15,000^{*}
Italy (FIMI)	Gold	25,000^{*}
New Zealand (RMNZ)	Platinum	15,000^{^}
United Kingdom (BPI)	Gold	100,000^{‡}
^{*} Sales figures based on certification alone.^{^} Shipments figures based on certification alone.^{‡} Sales+streaming figures based on certification alone.

== Release history ==
Release formats for Nothing Has Changed
Region	Date	Label	Format(s)	Ref.
UK	18 November 2014	Parlophone	Double LP	
UK	18 November 2014	Parlophone	2xCD	
UK	18 November 2014	Parlophone	3xCD	
US	18 November 2014	Columbia; Legacy	Double LP	
US	18 November 2014	Columbia; Legacy	2xCD	
US	18 November 2014	Columbia; Legacy	3xCD	
