= Bonjour Kathrin =

Bonjour Kathrin may refer to:

- Bonjour Kathrin (film), a 1956 German film directed by Karl Anton and starring Caterina Valente
- Bonjour Kathrin – Caterina Valente präsentiert ihre größten Erfolge, a 1965 album by Caterina Valente
