= Toy (David Bowie album) =

Posthumously released album by David Bowie

Studio album by David Bowie
- Released: 26 November 2021
- Recorded: July–October 2000; Mid-2021 (Unplugged overdubs)
- Studios: Sear Sound, Looking Glass and Alice's Restaurant (New York)
- Length: 50:36 (2021 version); 158:48 (Toy:Box version); 62:07 (2011 leak)
- Labels: ISO; Parlophone
- Producers: David Bowie; Mark Plati

David Bowie chronology
| Brilliant Adventure (1992–2001) (2021) | Toy (2021) | Moonage Daydream (2022) |

Singles from Toy
- 1. "You've Got a Habit of Leaving" Released: 29 September 2021; 2. "Karma Man" / "Silly Boy Blue (Alternative Ending Mix)" Released: 15 October 2021; 3. "Can't Help Thinking About Me" Released: 19 November 2021; 4. "Shadow Man (Unplugged & Somewhat Slightly Electric Mix)" Released: 6 January 2022

Toy is a studio album (Note: Blackstar is Bowie's final studio album according to the press release for the 2025 box set I Can't Give Everything Away (2002–2016).) by the English musician David Bowie, posthumously released in November 2021. It was recorded from July to October 2000 in New York City and featured re-recordings of songs Bowie recorded between 1964 and 1971, along with a couple of new tracks. The project was co-produced by Bowie and Mark Plati and featured musicians from Bowie's then-touring band—Plati, Earl Slick, Gail Ann Dorsey, Mike Garson and Sterling Campbell—with overdubs from Lisa Germano, Gerry Leonard and Cuong Vu.

Bowie's intention for the project was to rehearse the tracks, record them live and release them as quickly as possible, predating the idea of the surprise album. Intended for release in March 2001, the album was shelved by EMI/Virgin, leading Bowie to depart the label and begin work on his next album Heathen (2002). Various Toy tracks saw release as B-sides and bonus tracks in the ensuing years; two were remade for Heathen and two appeared on the Nothing Has Changed compilation in 2014.

Different mixes of the Toy tracks leaked onto the Internet in 2011, which caught media attention. Ten years later, Warner Music Group announced in September 2021 that Toy would get an official release as part of the box set Brilliant Adventure (1992–2001) on 26 November, through Bowie's own ISO label and Parlophone. A separate deluxe edition, featuring previously unseen photographs, alternate mixes, proposed B-sides and 13 new remixes of the tracks, was released on 7 January 2022. The official release received positive reviews from music critics, with many highlighting Bowie's vocal performances. The album was a commercial success, debuting at number five on the UK Albums Chart, becoming Bowie's 35th UK top 10 album.

== Recording and production ==
I've pulled together a selection of songs from a somewhat unusual reservoir and booked time in a studio. I cannot wait to sit in a claustrophobic space with seven other energetic people and sing till my tits drop off.

— David Bowie

In 1999, during the Hours Tour, David Bowie began performing songs he originally recorded in the 1960s. After ending his Mini Tour with a performance at the Glastonbury Festival in June 2000, he stated, "I hate to waste the energy of a show-honed band so I've asked one and all if they would like to make an album immediately when we get back to New York." He then revealed his intention of re-recording these songs, explaining "Not so much Pin Ups II as an Up Date I." Work on the "Sixties album" began a month later in July under the working title Toy, which came from a lyric in two songs recorded. The lineup consisted of the members of Bowie's touring band: Earl Slick (guitar), Gail Ann Dorsey (bass), Mike Garson (piano), Mark Plati and Sterling Campbell (drums).

According to the biographer David Buckley, the band rehearsed the songs at Sear Sound Studios in New York City before recording them as live tracks. Plati recalled: "The idea was to keep it loose, fast, and not clean things up too much or dwell on perfection. As a result, we had 13 basic tracks cut in around nine days." Slick later told Rolling Stone: "We had been doing a lot of gigs up to that point. We didn't have to do a whole lot of thinking about how to approach the songs. We had an operating system; an unspoken one. We hardly ever talked about anything. We'd just look at each other, or David would look at us, and it would just happen." He also stated that he refused to listen to Bowie's original recordings of the tracks, so to prevent the originals from influencing his playing on the new versions. Plati, whom Bowie chose to co-produce the project, was integral to the new album's sound. Pete Keppler engineered the sessions, while Bowie's former producer Tony Visconti provided string arrangements on two tracks. Recording took a two-month break in August due to the birth of Bowie and Iman's daughter Alexandria.

Following the two-month break, multi-instrumentalist Lisa Germano was hired by Bowie, at Plati's suggestion, to contribute overdubs. After seeing her perform in New York for the rock band Eels in August, Plati stated "I knew I needed to get her on the Bowie album." Germano was thrilled by the experience and both Bowie and Plati commended her contributions. Overdubs commenced at New York's Looking Glass Studios in October. Also hired were Gerry Leonard and Cuong Vu, who contributed guitar and trumpet, respectively. Also recorded during this time was a cover of the Who's "Pictures of Lily" for the tribute album Substitute: The Songs of the Who. Mixing began at the end of October, with Bowie predicting a release date of March 2001.

== Songs ==
Toy primarily consists of re-recordings of various songs Bowie originally recorded between 1964 and 1971, some with numerous bands. The author Marc Spitz describes it as "a sort of Pin Ups without the hits". These included: "Liza Jane", Bowie's 1964 debut single; "You've Got a Habit of Leaving", a 1965 A-side; "Baby Loves That Way", a 1965 B-side; "Can't Help Thinking About Me", a 1966 A-side; "I Dig Everything", a 1966 A-side; "The London Boys", a 1966 B-side; "Silly Boy Blue", first released on Bowie's 1967 eponymous debut album; "Let Me Sleep Beside You", "In the Heat of the Morning" and "Karma Man", rejected tracks recorded in 1967 that first appeared on The World of David Bowie compilation (1970); and "Conversation Piece", a 1970 B-side. Additionally, a new version of "Shadow Man", which dated back to the 1971 Ziggy Stardust sessions, was recorded. Many of these tracks had previously seen release on various compilation albums, such as Early On (1964–1966) (1991) and The Deram Anthology 1966–1968 (1997).

Along with the re-recorded tracks, several new songs were written for the project, including "Afraid", "Uncle Floyd" and "Toy" (later retitled "Your Turn to Drive"). Bowie stated that these were written in the style he "may have written them in the sixties". More tracks written for Toy included "Hole in the Ground" and "Miss American High". Bowie explained on his website, BowieNet, that "some of the songs from the sixties were never recorded, let alone released, so will be as new to you as any of the new ones that I've written." Regarding the tracks themselves, Bowie stated: "The songs are so alive and full of colour, they jump out of the speakers. It's really hard to believe that they were written so long ago."

== Cancelled release and aftermath ==
Bowie initially wanted to release Toy as quickly as possible. In the early 2000s, the idea of a surprise album was several years ahead of its time. Plati later commented, "Record labels just weren't set up to do that at the time—too many moving parts and all the rest of it." Originally scheduled for release in March 2001, Toy was initially delayed to May. In June, Bowie revealed: "EMI/Virgin seem to have a lot of scheduling conflicts this year, which has put an awful lot on the back burner. Toy is finished and ready to go, and I will make an announcement as soon as I get a very real date." After making Bowie's back catalogue available for digital download in 2000, the label, who were in the middle of various financial struggles, feared poor commercial performance for Toy and expressed a desire for an album of new material instead, indefinitely shelving the record. In October, Bowie responded "Fine by me. I'm extremely happy with the new stuff ...[but] I won't let Toy slide away. I'm working on a way that you'll be able to get the songs next year as well as the newie." Buckley argues that had it been released, Toy would have "easily" reached the UK top 20, even if it was bought only by Bowie's hardcore fans.

As the label were negotiating, Bowie began work with Visconti on Heathen. According to Visconti, Bowie was "hurt terribly" by Toy's rejection and as a result, left EMI/Virgin and signed an agreement with Columbia Records in early 2002 to issue Heathen via his own ISO label. Between 2002 and 2003, tracks from Toy, including "Conversation Piece", "Shadow Man", "You've Got a Habit of Leaving" and "Baby Loves that Way", appeared as various B-sides and bonus tracks. "Afraid" and "Uncle Floyd" were remade for Heathen, with the latter retitled "Slip Away". "Let Me Sleep Beside You" and "Your Turn to Drive" later saw official release on the three-disc edition of the 2014 compilation Nothing Has Changed. Bowie remarked in 2003:

Toy has actually started now to become a reservoir of B-sides and bonus tracks, so it's much depleted. From the original 14 or so that I did, I think seven are now out there. I think there's still enough in the past to be able to pop some more back and top it up, so to speak, but you know what? New writing just takes precedence. It always does.

== Leak and official release ==
In March 2011, 14 tracks from the Toy sessions, excluding "Karma Man" and "Can't Help Thinking About Me", were leaked onto the Internet, attracting media attention. The leaked tracks are different mixes compared to the officially released B-sides and bonus tracks. According to the biographer Nicholas Pegg, the edits suggest that they are not final master recordings, rather tracks at an earlier stage of mixing. When asked about the leak, Plati denied any involvement, stating, "I think someone got a rough mix on CD somehow." Regarding the leak overall, Pegg comments that it is "fascinating, thrilling and beautiful – and, as is so often the case with Bowie's work, an obvious creative stepping-stone between the previous album and the next."

Ten years later, on 29 September 2021, Warner Music Group announced that Toy would get an official release on 26 November as part of the box set Brilliant Adventure (1992–2001) through ISO and Parlophone. "You've Got a Habit of Leaving" was released as a digital single the same day. "Karma Man" and an "alternative ending mix" of "Silly Boy Blue" were released as the next single on 15 October, while "Can't Help Thinking About Me" followed on 19 November. Plati, who assisted in the mixing of the Toy material for the box set, said in a statement:

Toy is like a moment in time captured in an amber of joy, fire and energy. It's the sound of people happy to be playing music. David revisited and re-examined his work from decades prior through prisms of experience and fresh perspective – a parallel not lost on me as I now revisit it twenty years later. From time to time, he used to say 'Mark, this is our album' – I think because he knew I was so deeply in the trenches with him on that journey. I'm happy to finally be able to say it now belongs to all of us.

A separate deluxe edition, titled Toy:Box, was released on 7 January 2022, the day before what would have been Bowie's 75th birthday. The release includes previously unseen photographs, alternate mixes, proposed B-sides and 13 new "Unplugged and Somewhat Slightly Electric" remixes of the Toy tracks. These remixes contain new acoustic guitar overdubs by Plati and Earl Slick, replicating a style done by the Rolling Stones' Keith Richards. The "Unplugged and Somewhat Slightly Electric" mix of "Shadow Man" was released as a single on streaming services on 6 January. The release ends with "Toy (Your Turn to Drive)", a new track compiled from an extended jam during a take of "I Dig Everything". Featuring updated mixing, Plati stated: "As it was culled from 'I Dig Everything', it makes sense to bookend the album with this track. It's also a fitting postscript to the Toy era." Visconti, who called it Bowie's "ghost album", was positive about its official release, telling Uncut magazine that he believed it contained some of Bowie's finest work. The album additionally saw standalone CD and LP releases on 5 August 2022, alongside the other studio albums from the Brilliant Adventure set.

== Critical reception ==
Professional ratings
Review scores
| Source | Rating |
|---|---|
| AllMusic | 3/5 stars |
| Evening Standard | 4/5 stars |
| The Guardian | 3/5 stars |
| The Independent | 5/5 stars |
| laut.de | 3/5 stars |
| Pitchfork | 6.5/10 |
| Rolling Stone | 3.5/5 stars |

The 2021 release of Toy received positive reviews from music critics. Writing for The Guardian, Alexis Petridis highlighted "Shadow Man" as a standout, further praising the versions of "Conversation Piece" and "Let Me Sleep Beside You". He ultimately called it "an enjoyable curiosity rather than a major release." The Independent's Helen Brown praised Bowie's vocal performance and the band's performance throughout the record and, like Petridis, highlighted the new versions of "Shadow Man" and "Conversation Piece". Sean T. Collins likewise commended the band's performance in Pitchfork, writing that when compared to the BBC Radio Theatre, London, June 27, 2000 live album included in the Brilliant Adventure box set, "the intimate setting [on Toy] works much better for the session-pro players than did the festival sprawl." The Evening Standard's David Smyth was also positive, highlighting the remade tracks as material long overdue for an official release.

Brenna Ehrlich was more modest in her review for Rolling Stone, calling Toy "a completely serviceable album" that lacks surprises and is "far from transcendent". Although she similarly noted Bowie's vocal performance as the standout, Ehrlich concluded that Toy is "supplemental material, a sidenote, a wandering walk off the main path with a friend we've been missing." When reviewing Brilliant Adventure, AllMusic's Stephen Thomas Erlewine found the Hours-style music "mildly appealing" and summarised: "it's a slight record but it's nice to have it as part of the official discography." Reviewing the deluxe edition, Erlewine called it a "record out of time", featuring songs clearly made during the 1960s with a "Y2K-era" production, which adds to its overall charm. However, he found the additional mixes in the deluxe edition insubstantially different from the main mixes, leading the deluxe package to be "monotonous".

=== Commercial performance ===
Commercially, Toy:Box debuted at number five on the UK Albums Chart, becoming Bowie's 35th UK top 10 album. It was also the biggest-selling release on physical formats. It also debuted at number two in Scotland, behind Twin Atlantic's Transparency (2022), number three in Germany, number four in the Netherlands and number five in Belgian Wallonia. Furthermore, Toy:Box reached the top 10 in Switzerland (7), Portugal (7), Belgian Flanders (8), and Finland (10). Toy:Box also achieved commercial success in other countries, reaching number 11 in Hungary, number 12 in France, number 13 in Spain, number 17 in Norway, number 18 in Ireland, number 21 in Italy, number 28 in Sweden, and number 32 in Japan.

== Track listing ==
All tracks are written by David Bowie, except where noted.

Toy – Disc 1 / Brilliant Adventure box set edition
| No. | Title | Original version on | Length |
|---|---|---|---|
| 1. | "I Dig Everything" | Single from 1966, Early On (1964–1966) | 5:03 |
| 2. | "You've Got a Habit of Leaving" | Single from 1965, Early On (1964–1966) | 4:48 |
| 3. | "The London Boys" | B-side of 1966 single "Rubber Band", The World of David Bowie | 3:47 |
| 4. | "Karma Man" | The World of David Bowie | 3:46 |
| 5. | "Conversation Piece" | B-side of "The Prettiest Star", Five Years (1969–1973) | 3:53 |
| 6. | "Shadow Man" | Previously unreleased; originally recorded in 1971 during the sessions for Ziggy Stardust | 4:40 |
| 7. | "Let Me Sleep Beside You" | The World of David Bowie | 3:14 |
| 8. | "Hole in the Ground" | Conversation Piece (Home demo) | 3:32 |
| 9. | "Baby Loves That Way" | B-side of "You've Got a Habit of Leaving", Early On (1964–1966) | 4:37 |
| 10. | "Can't Help Thinking About Me" | Single from 1966, Early On (1964–1966) | 3:25 |
| 11. | "Silly Boy Blue" | David Bowie (1967) | 5:35 |
| 12. | "Toy (Your Turn to Drive)" | Nothing Has Changed (2014) | 4:16 |
| Total length: | | | 50:36 |

Toy:Box – Disc 2: Alternatives & Extras
| No. | Title | Original version on | Length |
|---|---|---|---|
| 1. | "Liza Jane" (Leslie Conn) | Single from 1964, Early On (1964–1966) | 4:46 |
| 2. | "You've Got a Habit of Leaving" (Alternative Mix) | | 4:49 |
| 3. | "Baby Loves That Way" (Alternative Mix) | | 4:43 |
| 4. | "Can’t Help Thinking About Me" (Alternative Mix) | | 3:26 |
| 5. | "I Dig Everything" (Alternative Mix) | | 5:05 |
| 6. | "The London Boys" (Alternative Version) | | 3:48 |
| 7. | "Silly Boy Blue" (Tibet Version) | | 5:12 |
| 8. | "Let Me Sleep Beside You" (Alternative Mix) | | 3:15 |
| 9. | "In the Heat of the Morning" | The World of David Bowie | 3:53 |
| 10. | "Conversation Piece" (Alternative Mix) | | 3:52 |
| 11. | "Hole in the Ground" (Alternative Mix) | | 3:54 |
| 12. | "Shadow Man" (Alternative Mix) | | 4:47 |
| 13. | "Toy (Your Turn to Drive)" (Alternative Mix) | | 4:43 |
| Total length: | | | 56:13 |

Toy:Box – Disc 3: Unplugged & Somewhat Slightly Electric
| No. | Title | Length |
|---|---|---|
| 1. | "In the Heat of the Morning" | 3:52 |
| 2. | "I Dig Everything" | 4:58 |
| 3. | "You've Got a Habit of Leaving" | 3:44 |
| 4. | "The London Boys" | 3:45 |
| 5. | "Karma Man" | 3:43 |
| 6. | "Conversation Piece" | 3:50 |
| 7. | "Shadow Man" | 4:18 |
| 8. | "Let Me Sleep Beside You" | 3:05 |
| 9. | "Hole in the Ground" | 3:18 |
| 10. | "Baby Loves That Way" | 4:34 |
| 11. | "Can't Help Thinking About Me" | 3:30 |
| 12. | "Silly Boy Blue" | 5:29 |
| 13. | "Toy (Your Turn to Drive)" | 3:53 |
| Total length: | | 51:59 |

- On disc 3, all tracks are noted as "Unplugged & Somewhat Slightly Electric Mix".

=== 2011 leak ===
The following is the track listing of the version of the album leaked in 2011, which is different from the officially released version.

All tracks are written by David Bowie, except where noted.

Toy – 2011 leak
| No. | Title | Length |
|---|---|---|
| 1. | "Uncle Floyd" | 6:15 |
| 2. | "Afraid" | 3:29 |
| 3. | "Baby Loves That Way" | 4:38 |
| 4. | "I Dig Everything" | 4:52 |
| 5. | "Conversation Piece" | 3:53 |
| 6. | "Let Me Sleep Beside You" | 3:14 |
| 7. | "Toy (Your Turn to Drive)" | 4:46 |
| 8. | "Hole in the Ground" | 3:30 |
| 9. | "Shadow Man" | 4:41 |
| 10. | "In the Heat of the Morning" | 3:52 |
| 11. | "You've Got a Habit of Leaving" | 4:49 |
| 12. | "Silly Boy Blue" | 5:33 |
| 13. | "Liza Jane" (Conn) | 4:48 |
| 14. | "The London Boys" | 3:47 |
| Total length: | | 62:07 |

- "Toy (Your Turn to Drive)" was also known as "Your Turn to Drive".

== Personnel ==
According to the biographer Nicholas Pegg:

- David Bowie – vocals, keyboards, Stylophone, mandolin
- Earl Slick – guitar
- Gerry Leonard – guitar
- Gail Ann Dorsey – bass
- Mark Plati – bass, guitar
- Mike Garson – keyboards
- Sterling Campbell – drums
- Lisa Germano – acoustic and electric violin, recorder, mandolin, accordion
- Cuong Vu – trumpet
- Holly Palmer – backing vocals
- Emm Gryner – backing vocals
- Tony Visconti – string arrangements

Production

- David Bowie – producer
- Mark Plati – producer
- Pete Keppler – engineer

== Charts ==
Chart performance for Toy
| Chart (2022) | Peak position |
|---|---|
| Austrian Albums (Ö3 Austria) | 4 |
| Belgian Albums (Ultratop Flanders) | 8 |
| Belgian Albums (Ultratop Wallonia) | 5 |
| Dutch Albums (Album Top 100) | 4 |
| Finnish Albums (Suomen virallinen lista) | 10 |
| French Albums (SNEP) | 12 |
| German Albums (Offizielle Top 100) | 3 |
| Hungarian Albums (MAHASZ) | 11 |
| Irish Albums (Official Charts) | 18 |
| Italian Albums (FIMI) | 21 |
| Japanese Albums (Oricon) | 32 |
| Norwegian Albums (VG-lista) | 17 |
| Portuguese Albums (AFP) | 7 |
| Scottish Albums (Official Charts) | 2 |
| Spanish Albums (PROMUSICAE) | 13 |
| Swedish Albums (Sverigetopplistan) | 28 |
| Swiss Albums (Schweizer Hitparade) | 7 |
| UK Albums (Official Charts) | 5 |
| US Top Alternative Albums (Billboard) | 22 |
| US Top Rock Albums (Billboard) | 37 |
