= Season in Salzburg =

Season in Salzburg may refer to:

- Season in Salzburg (operetta), an Austrian operetta by Kurt Feltz
- Season in Salzburg (1952 film), an Austrian film adaptation
- Season in Salzburg (1961 film), an Austrian film adaptation
