= The Hi-Fi Nightingale =

Compilation album by Caterina Valente
- Released: 1956
- Genre: Pop, Latin
- Label: Decca, DL 8203

Professional ratings
Review scores
Source	Rating
AllMusic	4.5/5 stars

The Hi-Fi Nightingale is an album from Caterina Valente. Released in the US (1956).

This album includes her big hits "Malagueña" and "The Breeze and I".

== Track listing ==
=== Side 1 ===
1. "The Breeze and I" (Andalucia)
2. "If Hearts Could Talk"
3. "Temptation"
4. "The Ecstasy"
5. "Jalousie"
6. "Fiesta Cubana"

=== Side 2 ===
1. "Malaguena"
2. "The Way You Love Me"
3. "My Lonely Lover" (Chanson D'Amour)
4. "Begin the Beguine"
5. "Siboney"
6. "This Must Be Wrong"
7. "This Must Be Wrong (Oho Aha)"

== Credits ==
- Georges Auric Composer
- Vera Bloom Composer
- Nacio Herb Brown Composer
- Henri Contet Composer
- Paul Durand Composer
- Kurt Feltz Composer, Producer
- Silvio Francesco Primary Artist
- Arthur Freed Composer
- Jacob Gade Composer
- Heinz Gietz Composer
- Kermit Goell Composer
- Jimmy Kennedy Composer
- Raymond Klages Composer
- Ernesto Lecuona Composer
- Dolly Morse Composer
- Cole Porter Composer
- Nat Simon Composer
- Herb Steiner Composer
- Kay Twomey Composer
- Caterina Valente Primary Artist, Vocals
- Fred Wise Composer
