= Eric van Aro =

- Genres: Jazz Pop House Lounge EDM
- Occupations: musician, singer, producer
- Instrument: voice
- Years active: 1983 - present
- Labels: ERAKI; ForeverRide
- Member of: Chronicles of a Fourth
- Website: ericvanaro.com

Eric van Aro (born August 8, 1958) is a European jazz and pop singer. He is the son of the Italian singer Caterina Valente and the German juggler/producer Erik van Aro. He grew up in the Italian part of Switzerland and in London, England. Van Aro has released several albums including Friends, Desert Motel, Obsession, Endless Roads as well as recordings of deep house and lounge music in collaboration with Marco "Soundee" Finotello. These collaborations were the basics for The EGH project He is a founding member of the rock group Chronicles of a Fourth.

== Solo ==
- 1983 –12" SO SELFISH/MAN IN THE NIGHT
- 1989 Duet with Caterina Valente "How do you keep the music playing"

Released on EAST WEST label "40 songs aus 40 jahren" Caterina Valente (p) 1993
Released on POLYDOR label " Auf der Strasse der Erinnerung" Caterina Valente (p) 1996
Released on Warners label "Danke Schön" Caterina Valente (p) 2006

- 2001 – From the Heart
- 2005 – Friends
- 2008 – Desert Motel
- 2010 – Christmas Song – Eric van Aro feat. Iguazu acoustic trio – Single
- 2010 – Le Blues du Businessman – Eric van Aro feat. Luca Verde – Single
- 2011 – Evil Games (The Tabloid Song) – Remixes – Eric van Aro feat. Marco Finotello
- 2012 – I'm not anyone - single
- 2013 – Obsession - EP - with Fabio Gianni piano
- 2015 – Endless Roads
- 2017 - From the Beginning and More

== With Marco "Soundee" Finotello ==
- THE PAINTING IN MY HEART (Marco Finotello remix) – Eric van Aro

Single on Love2lounge label (p) 2012
Compilation – Erotic Affairs Volume Five – Wax’N'soul Records (p) 2010
Compilation – Chillin' on My Sofa – Invisible Lounge Label (p) 2012
Compilation – Meet Me at the Bar – Invisible Lounge Label (p) 2012
Compilation – Luxury Lounge Caffe vol. 6 – Audio Lotion Recordings (p) 2012

- U R – Marco Soundee feat. Eric van ARO

EP – U R – Beats4life label (p) 2010
Compilation –Deep and Soulful vol. 6 – Tenor Recordings (p) 2012
Compilation – A House Affair vol. 8 – Musica Diaz/Senorita label (p) 2011
Compilation – It's All About House Music vol. 5 – Musica Diaz/Senorita (p) 2011
Compilation – Techno Soul "1" – Emotional Body Music – Gastspiel Records (p) 2012
Compilation – For the Love of Music vol. 4 – Musica Diaz / Senorita (p) 2012

- Love U Madly – Marco Soundee feat. Eric van Aro

EP – LoveUMadly – Beats4Life label (p) 2010
Compilation – After Work House vol. 1 – Golden Diamon Records (p) 2011
Compilation – It's All About House Music – vol. 7 – Musica Diaz/senorita (p)

- JAZZ – Marco Soundee feat. Eric van Aro

EP - Jazz – Beats4Life label (p) 2010
Compilation – When Lounge Meets Jazz – Audio Lotion Recordings (p) 2011
Compilation – I Know U Got Soul vol. 7 – Musica Diaz/Senorita (p) 2011
Compilation – Midnight Lounge Café vol. 4 – Audio Lotion Recordings (p) 2010
Compilation – Smooth & Relaxed vol. 4 – Wax’N'soul Records (p) 2011
Compilation – Beach Club – Le Bien et le Mal Recordings – (p) 2010
Compilation – For the Love of Music vol. 3 – Musica Diaz/Senorita (p) 2012
Compilation – Deep & Soulful vol. 5 – Tenor Recordings (p) 2011
Compilation – Deep in the Night vol. 2 & 3 – Musica Diaz / Senorita – (p) 2012
Compilation – Deep & Glorious – Tretmuehle label – (p) 2010
Compilation – Organic House vol. 1 – Musica Diaz /Senorita – (p) 2011
Compilation – Global Grooves vol. 1 Paris – Wax’N'soul Records (p) 2011
Compilation – East Volume Cinnamon – Wormland Music label (p) 2011

== The Egh Project ==
- Life Song – ForeverRide – (p) 2014 – distrib. DigDis!
- Life Song – Remixes 2015 – ForeverRide – (p) 2015 – distrib. DigDis!

== Chronicles of a Fourth ==
- 2020 – Open Relationship Blues
