= Liza Jane (David Bowie song) =

Song by David Bowie

- original single label

Single by Davie Jones with the King Bees
- B-side: "Louie, Louie Go Home"
- Released: 5 June 1964
- Recorded: May 1964
- Studio: Decca, London
- Genre: R&B
- Length: 2:18
- Label: Vocalion Pop
- Songwriters: Traditional, credited to Leslie Conn
- Producer: Leslie Conn

David Bowie singles chronology
"Liza Jane" (1964)	"I Pity the Fool" (1965)

"Liza Jane" is the first recording released as a single by David Bowie, and credited to Davie Jones with the King-Bees. It was released in 1964 when Bowie was 17 years old. The B-side of the single was the Paul Revere and the Raiders song "Louie, Louie Go Home". Both songs on the single were recorded in a seven-hour session at Decca Studios in Broadhurst Gardens, West Hampstead.

Bowie came in touch with Leslie Conn, who ran Doris Day's music publishing company and was a talent scout for the Dick James Organisation. Conn booked the King Bees for a wedding anniversary party, but with loud RnB on the setlist, Conn stopped the gig after only 10 minutes. Conn still became the King Bees' manager and promoter for some months in 1964, and they recorded and released "Liza Jane" as a single for the Decca Records label Vocalion Pop. Despite promoting the single on the television shows Juke Box Jury, Ready Steady Go! and The Beat Room, and receiving good radio coverage, the single sold poorly and the band was subsequently dropped from the label.

The song was an arrangement of the old standard "Li'l Liza Jane", but Conn was credited as the songwriter, and the usual story is that this was done to get more royalties from the single. Conn recalled in 1997 how the King Bees had come up with a six-bar blues, which everyone used. Conn came up with some ideas of his own for the song, they improvised and the song came together.

After Conn and Bowie parted in 1964, Conn moved to Mallorca for a few years, and was one day on the phone with his mother, who wanted to get rid of a few hundred copies of "Liza Jane" that were stored in her garage. They agreed to throw them away.

Bowie recorded the song again, in 2000, for the album Toy, which leaked on the Internet in 2011 before being officially released in 2021 as part of the Brilliant Adventure (1992–2001) box set; however the 2000 recording of "Liza Jane" was not included in the version of Toy present on Brilliant Adventure. The 2000 recording was eventually included in the Toy:Box standalone release in January 2022.

== Personnel ==
- Leslie Conn – production
- David Jones (David Bowie) – vocals, alto saxophone
- George Underwood – rhythm guitar, Harmonica, vocals
- Roger Bluck – lead guitar
- Francis Howard – bass
- Bob Allen – drums

== Live versions ==
- On 5 June 2004, during a concert of his A Reality Tour at the PNC Bank Arts Center in Holmdel, United States, Bowie played the first verse and chorus of "Liza Jane" coinciding with the 40th anniversary of its release.

== Other releases ==
- The single was re-released by Decca in the UK in November 1978.
- On acetate a version with a slightly longer fade-out has been released.
- The song was released on Bowie's 2014 compilation album Nothing Has Changed.
- A 2000 rerecording was included on the "Alternatives & Extras" disc of the official release of Toy in 2022.
