= Let Me Sleep Beside You =

Song by David Bowie

Song by David Bowie

from the album The World of David Bowie
- Released: 6 March 1970
- Recorded: 1 September 1967
- Studio: Advision, London
- Genre: Rock
- Length: 3:24
- Label: Decca
- Songwriter: David Bowie
- Producer: Tony Visconti

"Let Me Sleep Beside You" is a song written and recorded by the English singer-songwriter David Bowie. It was recorded on the same day as "Karma Man", on 1 September 1967 at Advision Studios in London and marked the beginning of Bowie's working relationship with producer Tony Visconti, which would last for the rest of Bowie's career. A departure from the pop and music hall-influenced material of Bowie's 1967 self-titled debut album and other singles for Deram Records, the song displays a more rock-oriented sound with a cello arrangement from Visconti. The impressionist lyrics also depart from Bowie's prior works, describing love using the act of sleeping together rather than through emotional attachment.

The song was rejected by Deram for release as a single, purportedly due to the risqué title. It remained unreleased until 1970's The World of David Bowie compilation. Bowie performed "Let Me Sleep Beside You" during his BBC radio session on 20 October 1969, which has seen release on numerous albums. A remixed version was also featured in the 1969 Love You till Tuesday film. Several publications, including The Guardian, Consequence of Sound and Mojo, have listed it as one of Bowie's best songs. Bowie later remade the song during the sessions for the Toy project in mid-2000, along with other tracks he wrote and recorded during the mid-1960s, such as "Karma Man". The remake first saw an official release on the three-disc edition of the 2014 compilation Nothing Has Changed and again in 2021 with the entire Toy album, as part of the Brilliant Adventure (1992–2001) box set. The remake was positively received.

== Background and recording ==
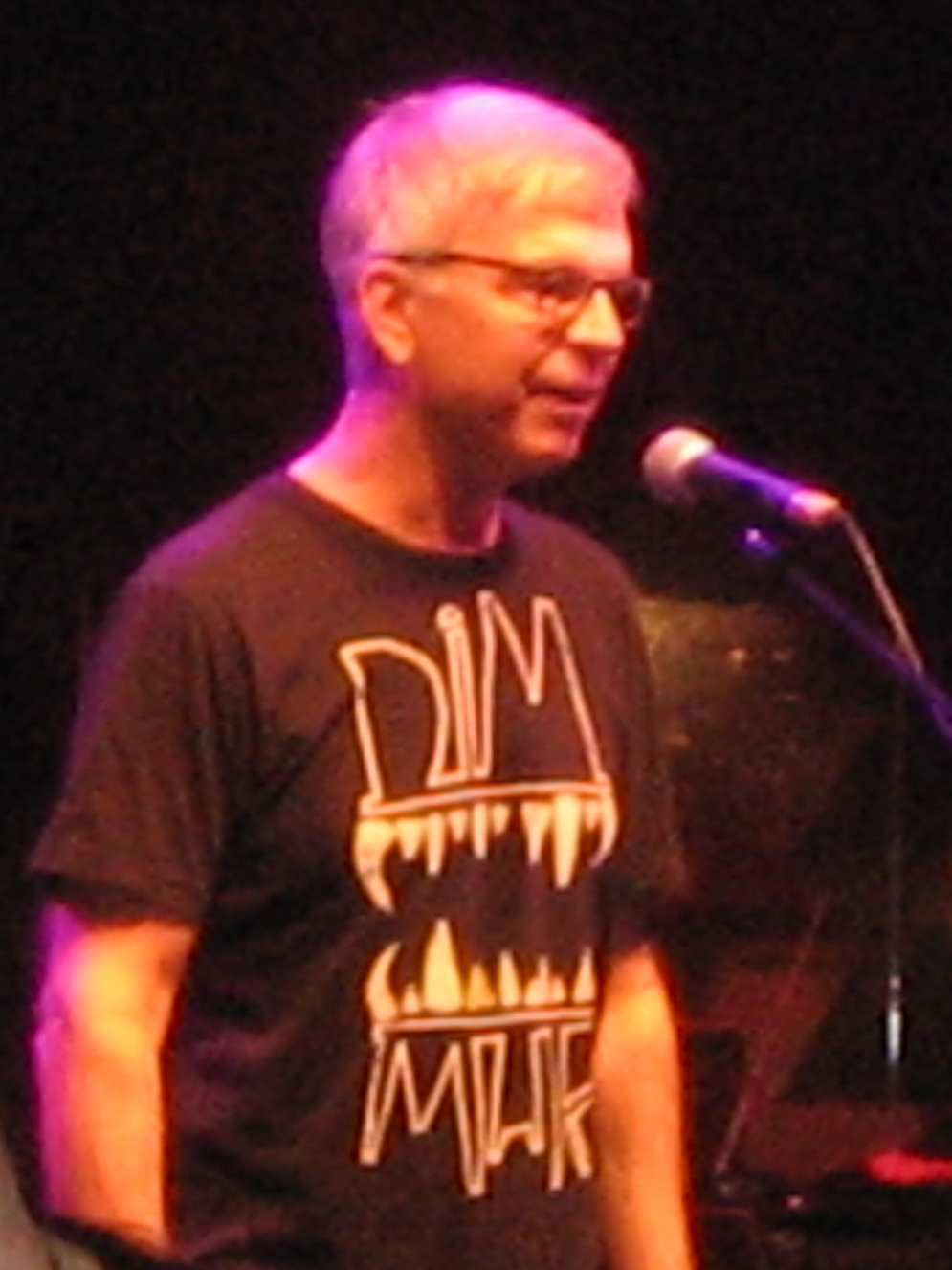
"Let Me Sleep Beside You" and "Karma Man" marked the first collaborations between Bowie and producer Tony Visconti (pictured in 2007).

After the commercial failure of his 1967 self-titled debut album and singles for Deram Records, David Bowie's manager Kenneth Pitt proposed he change producers. Denny Cordell turned an offer down, but suggested his assistant Tony Visconti, a New Yorker who had worked with the Move and Manfred Mann. Bowie and Visconti became immediate friends, which the former attributed in 1976 to their mutual interests in Tibetan Buddhism. Visconti agreed to produce and arrange his next prospective single for Deram, marking the beginning of a working relationship that would last for the rest of Bowie's career. According to biographer Chris O'Leary, Bowie needed a producer who shared similar interests and working methods rather than established producers he had worked with previously, such as Tony Hatch and Mike Vernon.

Composing his next single, Bowie wrote "Let Me Sleep Beside You" using the Rolling Stones' contemporary single "Let's Spend the Night Together" for inspiration. (Note: Bowie later covered "Let's Spend the Night Together" for his 1973 album Aladdin Sane.) For the B-side, Bowie wrote "Karma Man", which reflected his growing interest in Tibetan Buddhism, similar to "Silly Boy Blue" from his debut album. According to biographer Nicholas Pegg, both tracks were reportedly written after Bowie's desire to write "some top ten rubbish". With Visconti producing and playing bass, the two tracks were recorded on 1 September 1967 at London's Advision Studios. The session took six hours to complete. Personnel hired for the session included guitarist John McLaughlin, who later found fame with the Mahavishnu Orchestra; guitarist Big Jim Sullivan, who previously contributed to David Bowie; drummer Andy White, who had played drums on the Beatles' "Love Me Do"; (Note: According to Pegg, Alan White, who later found fame with John Lennon's Plastic Ono Band and Yes, played drums.) and Visconti's then-wife Siegrid, who sang backing vocals. Visconti later expressed disappointment in the finished tracks, stating in 1977, "I think these tracks were the reason David was thrown off Deram. They really were terrible."

== Composition and lyrics ==
"Let Me Sleep Beside You" marks a departure from the pop and music hall-influenced material of David Bowie in favour of a more rock-oriented sound. Pegg states that it represented a bridge between the Deram material and the rockier Space Oddity album (1969). The song is primarily in the key of C major, the same key as "Let's Spend the Night Together". Visconti scored a celli arrangement, which O'Leary states gives the track "a sense of lightness and ease" compared to the brass and woodwind-heavy sound of Bowie's previous Deram recordings. Author James E. Perone compares the arrangement and production to the contemporary sound of the Moody Blues' Days of Future Passed (1967), while Marc Spitz compares it to George Martin's work with the Beatles. The song nevertheless retains various chord changes from his previous releases, while Bowie utilised vocal implications that would become the trademark of his 1970s records; author Peter Doggett particularly highlights the "Would You?" call as anticipating the persona Bowie used on The Rise and Fall of Ziggy Stardust and the Spiders from Mars (1972).

Lyrically, "Let Me Sleep Beside You" also marks a break from Bowie's previous works, describing the act of sleeping together compared to emotional attachment. Perone writes that the lyrics are more impressionist than before, and anticipated tracks from the artist's 1970s period, including "Be My Wife" (1977). He analyses: "What Bowie effectively does in songs such as 'Let Me Sleep Beside You' and 'Be My Wife' is to express the possibility that love and attachment are sometimes not best defined in stereotypical, cliché ways, but sometimes through the less-frequently expressed, but very real other associated emotional needs."

== Release and aftermath ==
[That song] might have been influenced by Simon & Garfunkel. I still thought I might have a chance of being a romantic songwriter, which never proved to be my forte.

— David Bowie

Deram's parent company Decca Records rejected "Let Me Sleep Beside You" for release as a single, primarily due to the song's suggestive title; they requested that Bowie change it to "Let Me Be Beside You". The Rolling Stones, also under Decca, were also receiving backlash over the title of "Let's Spend the Night Together" at the time; radio stations refused to play it, and Mick Jagger was forced to change the lyric to "let's spend some time together" for their performance on The Ed Sullivan Show. Additionally, Pegg surmises that Decca were losing faith in Bowie after multiple commercial failures. As such, "Let Me Sleep Beside You" and "Karma Man" remained unreleased until The World of David Bowie compilation, which was issued by Decca on 6 March 1970 to cash-in on Bowie's success with "Space Oddity". (Note: Also released on this day was Bowie's single "The Prettiest Star" for Mercury Records.) Bowie himself approved the tracklisting for the compilation.

After its rejection, Bowie performed "Let Me Sleep Beside You" during his BBC radio session on 20 October 1969; this version saw release on BBC Sessions 1969–1972 (Sampler) (1996), Bowie at the Beeb (2000) and the 2009 reissue of Space Oddity. He was backed by the British band Junior's Eyes for this performance. (Note: Junior's Eyes also played on Space Oddity (1969)) In his book Starman, biographer Paul Trynka describes this version as "superb", praising the band's performance and arguing that it provided a "tantalizing glimpse" of how superior the material from the era would have sounded if played live. "Let Me Sleep Beside You" was also featured in the 1969 Love You till Tuesday film, where Bowie mimed to a remixed version of the original track while "brandishing a dummy guitar" and impersonating Jagger. A German version, with lyrics translated by Lisa Busch, was prepared for a proposed German-language cut of the film, but was never recorded.

Bowie's original demo of the song, recorded in the summer of 1967, displays a more folk-inspired number with country and western influences. An alternative mix of the Deram recording, featuring a different vocal take on the bridge, has appeared on bootlegs. A previously unreleased stereo mix of the song was released on the 2010 deluxe edition of David Bowie. "Let Me Sleep Beside You" has since appeared in lists ranking Bowie's best songs by The Guardian (50), Consequence of Sound (68) and Mojo (100). The Guardian's Alexis Petridis called the song superior to Bowie's entire debut album and acknowledged the sound as foreshadowing what was to come, while Consequence of Sound's Lior Phillips noted it as the beginning of "one of the most fruitful producer-artist relationships in rock history". Mojo's Ian Harrison wrote that the song sees Bowie "on world-weary yet determined form".

== Toy version ==
"Let Me Sleep Beside You"

Song by David Bowie

from the album Toy
- Released: 26 November 2021
- Recorded: July–October 2000
- Studio: Sear Sound and Looking Glass, New York City
- Length: 3:14
- Label: ISO; Parlophone
- Songwriter: David Bowie
- Producers: David Bowie; Mark Plati

Bowie re-recorded "Let Me Sleep Beside You" during the sessions for the Toy project between July and October 2000, along with other tracks he wrote and recorded in the mid-1960s, including "Karma Man". The lineup consisted of the members of Bowie's then-touring band: guitarist Earl Slick, bassist Gail Ann Dorsey, pianist Mike Garson, musician Mark Plati and drummer Sterling Campbell. With co-production from Bowie and Plati, the band rehearsed the songs at Sear Sound Studios in New York City before recording them as live tracks. Plati stated that he refused to listen to Bowie's original recordings of the tracks, as so to prevent the originals from influencing his playing on the new versions. Overdubs were recorded at New York's Looking Glass Studios.

Toy was initially intended for release in March 2001, before it was shelved by EMI/Virgin due to financial issues. So, Bowie departed the label and recorded his next album Heathen (2002). The remake later saw official release on the three-disc edition of the 2014 compilation Nothing Has Changed. In March 2011, tracks from the Toy sessions, including "Let Me Sleep Beside You", were leaked online, attracting media attention. Ten years later, on 29 September 2021, Warner Music Group announced that Toy would get an official release on 26 November as part of the box set Brilliant Adventure (1992–2001) through ISO and Parlophone.

A separate deluxe edition, titled Toy:Box, was released on 7 January 2022, which contains two new mixes of the song: an "alternative mix" and an "Unplugged and Somewhat Slightly Electric" mix, featuring new guitar parts by Plati and Slick. Reviewing Toy, Petridis called the remake "great", a sentiment echoed by Pegg, who found it "splendid".

== Personnel ==
According to Chris O'Leary:

Original version

- David Bowie – vocals
- John McLaughlin – lead guitar
- Big Jim Sullivan – acoustic guitar
- Tony Visconti – bass, arranger, producer
- Andy White – drums
- Siegrid Visconti – backing vocals
- Unknown musicians – celli

Toy version

- David Bowie – vocals, producer
- Earl Slick – lead guitar
- Gerry Leonard – rhythm guitar
- Gail Ann Dorsey – bass, backing vocals
- Mike Garson – keyboards
- Mark Plati – rhythm guitar, producer
- Sterling Campbell – drums
- Holly Palmer – backing vocals
- Emm Gryner – backing vocals
