= Karma Man =

Song by David Bowie

Song by David Bowie

from the album The World of David Bowie
- Released: 6 March 1970
- Recorded: 1 September 1967
- Studio: Advision, London
- Length: 2:58
- Label: Decca
- Songwriter: David Bowie
- Producer: Tony Visconti

"Karma Man" is a song written and recorded by the English singer-songwriter David Bowie. It was recorded on 1 September 1967 at Advision Studios, based in London, on the same day as "Let Me Sleep Beside You", and marked the beginning of Bowie's working relationship with producer Tony Visconti, which would last for the rest of the artist's career. Lyrically, the song expresses Bowie's growing interest in Tibetan Buddhism, concerning a character who is put on display as a "freak" in a carnival tent. The music reflects the Buddhist themes and was likened to the works of the Beatles.

Initially proposed as a B-side, it remained unreleased until The World of David Bowie compilation in March 1970. Bowie performed the song during two of his BBC radio sessions, one of which was released on the 2000 compilation Bowie at the Beeb. Writer Nicholas Pegg feels that the "slow down, slow down" chorus in "Karma Man" "appears to be a source" for Suede's "The Drowners", and that there is a "melodic echo" in "Beautiful Ones". Bowie remade the song during the sessions for the Toy project in mid-2000, along with other tracks he wrote and recorded during the mid-1960s, including the song's original intended A-side "Let Me Sleep Beside You". The remake saw an official release in 2021 with the entire project as part of the Brilliant Adventure (1992–2001) box set.

== Background and recording ==
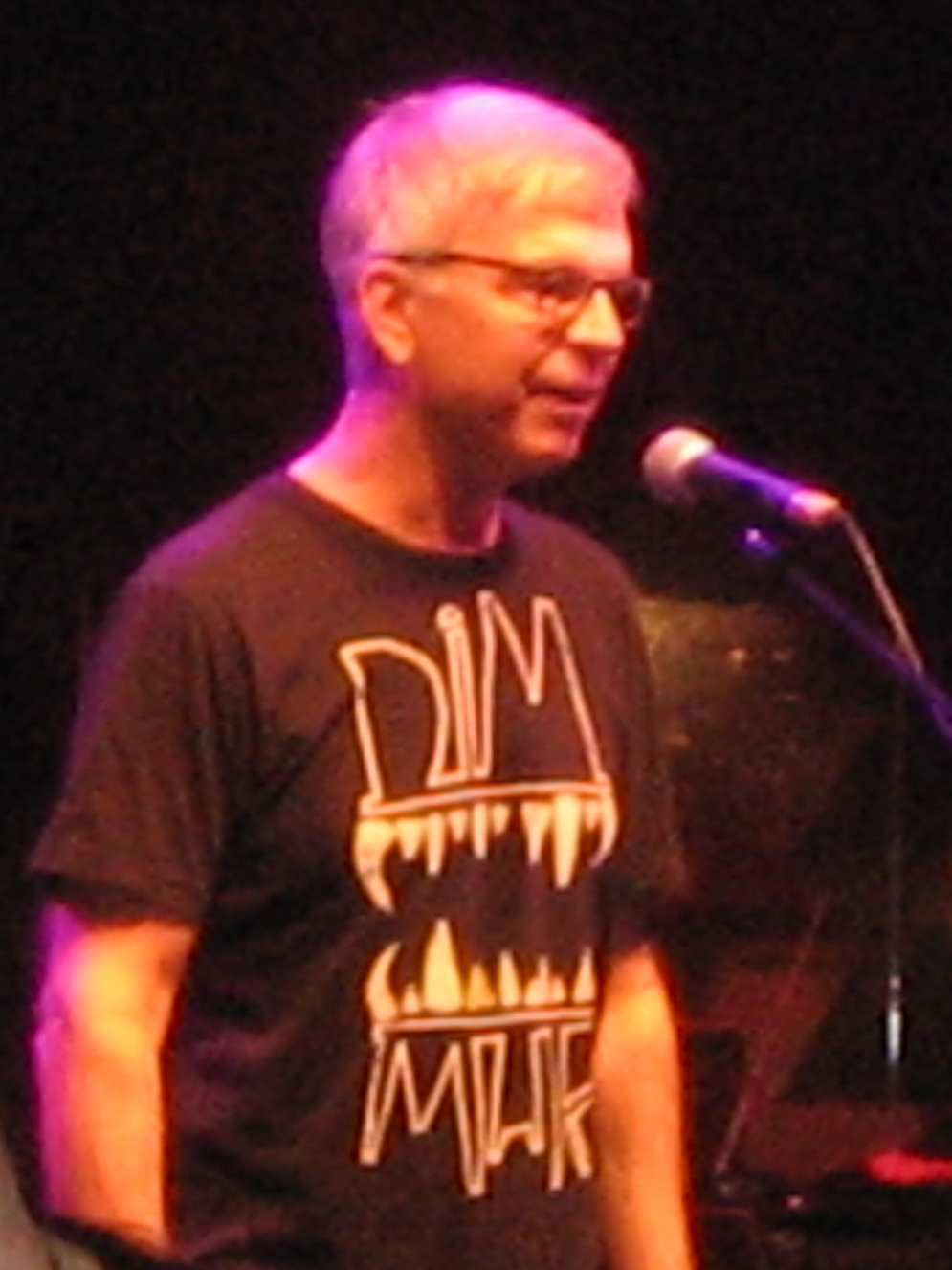
"Karma Man" and "Let Me Sleep Beside You" marked the first collaborations between Bowie and producer Tony Visconti (pictured in 2007).

After the commercial failure of his self-titled debut album (1967) and singles for Deram Records, David Bowie's manager Kenneth Pitt proposed he change producers. Denny Cordell turned the offer down but suggested his assistant Tony Visconti, a New Yorker who had worked with the Move and Manfred Mann. Bowie and Visconti became immediate friends, which the former attributed in 1976 to their mutual interests in Tibetan Buddhism. Visconti agreed to produce and arrange his next prospective single for Deram, marking the beginning of a working relationship that would last for the rest of Bowie's career. According to biographer Chris O'Leary, Bowie needed a producer who shared similar interests and working methods rather than established producers he had worked with previously, such as Tony Hatch and Mike Vernon.

According to biographer Nicholas Pegg, Bowie wrote "Karma Man", along with "Let Me Sleep Beside You", after he had a desire to write "some top ten rubbish". With Visconti producing and playing bass, the two tracks were recorded on 1 September 1967 at London's Advision Studios. (Note: Bowie later recorded a portion of The Man Who Sold the World (1970) at Advision.) The session took six hours to complete. Personnel hired for the session included guitarist John McLaughlin, who later found fame with the Mahavishnu Orchestra; guitarist Big Jim Sullivan, who previously contributed to David Bowie; drummer Andy White; (Note: According to Pegg, Alan White, who later found fame with John Lennon's Plastic Ono Band and Yes, played drums.) and Tony's then-wife Siegrid, who sang backing vocals. Tony Visconti later expressed disappointment in the finished tracks, stating in 1977, "I think these tracks were the reason David was thrown off Deram. They really were terrible."

== Composition ==
Like "Silly Boy Blue" from David Bowie, "Karma Man" displays Bowie's growing interest in Tibetan Buddhism, which eventually led him and Visconti to join the Tibet Society. According to O'Leary, the song is a tribute to monks in exile such as Chime Rinpoche. The song's main character is presented as a "freak" and is left praying in a carnival tent as an exhibit, living in isolation away from his companions. Featuring a homage to Ray Bradbury's The Illustrated Man (1951), More positive in tone than "Silly Boy Blue", O'Leary analyses the track as a metaphor for "the lama in the West" or a "freak" residing in a faraway area. Bowie described Buddhist monks as "super-human", claiming to Melody Maker that they "could go days without eating, spend months living underground and they could live for centuries", a theme he would revisit for 1977's "Sons of the Silent Age". O'Leary compares these beliefs to the Marvel Comics' character Doctor Strange.

The Buddhist themes are reflected in the music, which O'Leary compares to "Eastern" music. The "syllable-stuffed" verses are in D major while the "richly-harmonized" refrains are in B major. Bowie moves up and down in sharps in the refrains, going from F♯-D♯-C♯-B on "slow down, slow down", to B-D♯-F♯ on "Karma Man". The song is mostly set in 4/4 common time, with the bars before the refrains in 2/4 half time. Author Peter Doggett likens Visconti's string arrangement to the orchestration of George Martin on the Beatles' "Eleanor Rigby" (1966). Alex Henderson of AllMusic similarly considered the track "Beatlesque". Doggett considers the song Bowie's "most creative marriages of words and music" up to that point.

== Release and aftermath ==
"Karma Man" was intended for release as a B-side to the proposed singles "Let Me Sleep Beside You" and "When I Live My Dream". After Deram's parent company Decca Records rejected both for release as singles, "Karma Man" remained unreleased until The World of David Bowie compilation, which was issued by Decca on 6 March 1970 to cash-in on Bowie's success with "Space Oddity". (Note: Also released on this day was Bowie's single "The Prettiest Star" for Mercury Records.) Bowie himself approved the tracklisting for the compilation. Before its release, Bowie had played the track for two of his BBC radio sessions on 13 May 1968 and 5 February 1970. The first, which appeared on the Bowie at the Beeb compilation in 2000, featured a lush string arrangement and backing vocals from Visconti and Steve Peregrin Took. O'Leary considers this version superior to the studio recording.

Bowie also offered the song as a potential cover to Manfred Mann, who declined it. A previously unreleased stereo mix of the song was later released on the 2010 deluxe edition of David Bowie. Pegg feels that the "slow down, slow down" chorus in "Karma Man" "appears to be a source" for Suede's "The Drowners", and that there is a "melodic echo" in "Beautiful Ones". The band acknowledged Bowie's influence in interviews, which led to an NME interview with Bowie and lead singer Brett Anderson shortly before the release of Bowie's Black Tie White Noise and Suede's self-titled debut album in 1993; this generated publicity for the two artists in the United Kingdom.

== Toy version ==
"Karma Man"

Song by David Bowie

from the album Toy
- Released: 15 October 2021
- Recorded: July–October 2000
- Studio: Sear Sound and Looking Glass, New York City
- Length: 3:46
- Label: ISO; Parlophone
- Songwriter: David Bowie
- Producers: David Bowie; Mark Plati

Bowie re-recorded "Karma Man" during the sessions for the Toy project between July and October 2000, along with other tracks he wrote and recorded in the mid-1960s, including "Let Me Sleep Beside You". The lineup consisted of the members of Bowie's then-touring band: guitarist Earl Slick, bassist Gail Ann Dorsey, pianist Mike Garson, musician Mark Plati and drummer Sterling Campbell. With co-production from Bowie and Plati, the band rehearsed the songs at Sear Sound Studios in New York City before recording them as live tracks. Plati stated that he refused to listen to Bowie's original recordings of the tracks, as so to prevent the originals from influencing his playing on the new versions. Overdubs were recorded at New York's Looking Glass Studios.

Toy was initially intended for release in March 2001, before it was shelved by EMI/Virgin due to financial issues. So, Bowie departed the label and recorded his next album Heathen (2002). On 29 September 2021, Warner Music Group announced that Toy would get an official release on 26 November as part of the box set Brilliant Adventure (1992–2001) through ISO and Parlophone. "Karma Man" and an "alternative ending mix" of "Silly Boy Blue" were released as a single ahead of the release on 15 October. Plati said about the release:

'Karma Man' is notable for Cuong Vu's opening and closing lines, and especially the glorious backing vocals from Holly Palmer, Emm Gryner, and Lisa Germano. [...] When I re-listened to these tracks, the sound of fall 2000 came flooding out of the speakers, from a song I'd not heard since then. I'm not too proud to say I shed a bit of a tear, something that happened a few times while mixing it.

A separate deluxe edition, titled Toy:Box, was released on 7 January 2022, which contains two new mixes of the song: an "alternative mix" and an "Unplugged and Somewhat Slightly Electric" mix, featuring new guitar parts by Plati and Slick. Reviewing Toy, The Independent's Helen Brown wrote that the remake has the "same attitude" as the original, although it "nods affectionately back at its [musical and lyrical] roots".

== Personnel ==
According to Chris O'Leary:

Original version

- David Bowie – vocals
- John McLaughlin – lead guitar
- Big Jim Sullivan – acoustic guitar
- Tony Visconti – bass, producer
- Andy White – drums
- Siegrid Visconti – backing vocals
- Unknown musicians – celli

Toy version

- David Bowie – vocals, producer
- Earl Slick – lead guitar
- Gerry Leonard – rhythm guitar
- Gail Ann Dorsey – bass, backing vocals
- Mike Garson – keyboards
- Mark Plati – rhythm guitar, producer
- Sterling Campbell – drums
- Holly Palmer – backing vocals
- Emm Gryner – backing vocals
- Unknown musicians – violins, violas, celli
