= The World of... series =

Compilation album series

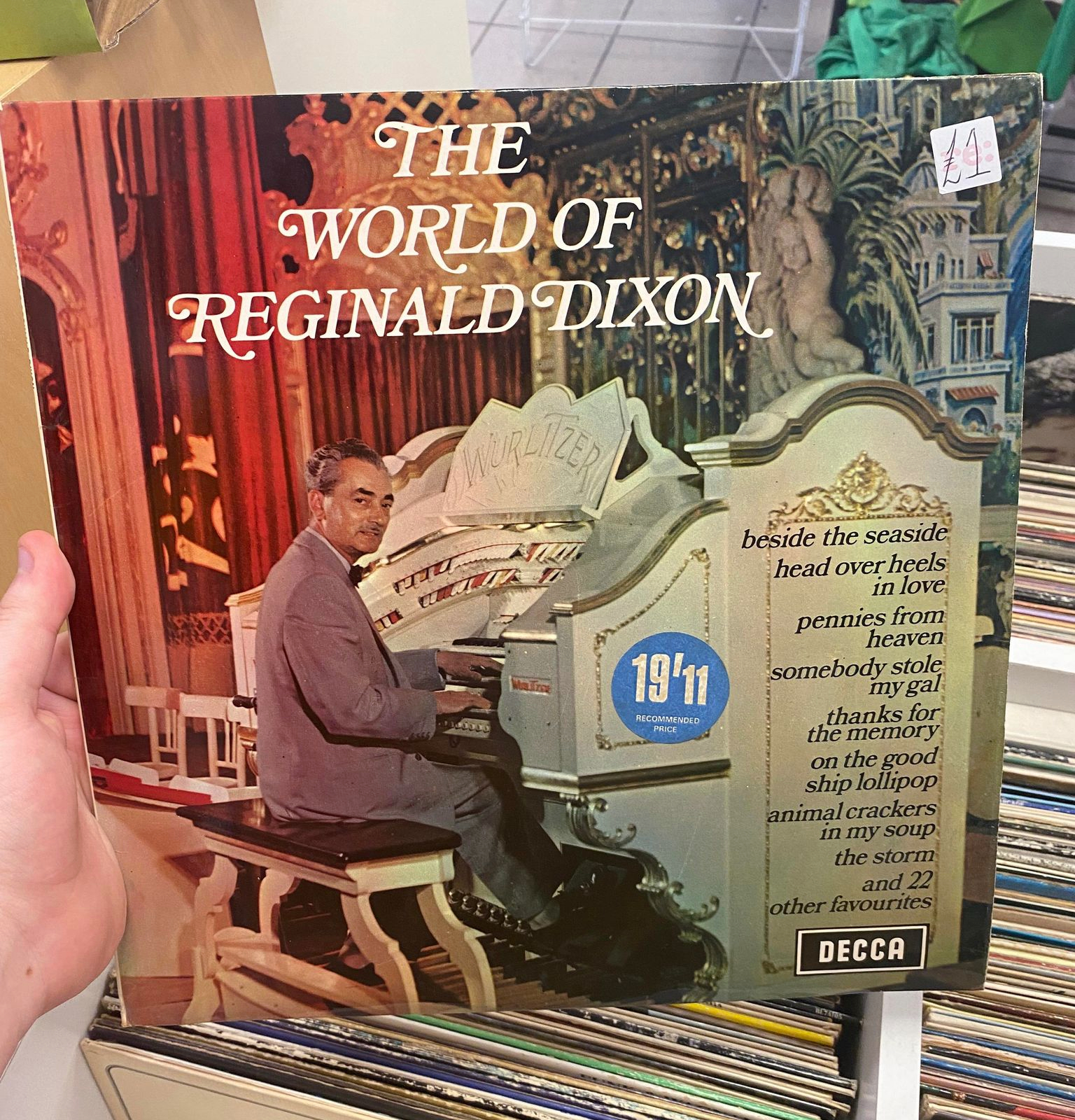
A copy of The World of Reginald Dixon in a charity shop

The World of... is a series of budget albums released by Decca Records and its subsidiaries. Launched in 1968, the series showcased a wide variety of the label's output including classical music, pop, folk, jazz, blues, world music, showtunes, comedy and spoken word releases. Among the editions are compilations, reissues, samplers and several collections based upon the BBC Radio programme Your Hundred Best Tunes. The World of... brought Decca’s catalogue to retailers like supermarkets, encouraging new buyers to "dip in". By 1975, it was described as "probably one of the best-selling series ever devised by a record company". The World of... albums are commonly found in charity shops in the UK.

The World of... series was formulated after Decca head Sir Edward Lewis was shown Germany's Phase 4 Stereo sampler albums on a business trip to the country. The series marked Decca's entry into the budget market, with the cut-price albums intended to entice consumers who didn’t usually buy LPs. Promoted with window displays, browser cards and colour posters, the series was an immediate success. By 1973, The World of... held 18-20 percent of the budget albums market in the UK, behind MFP with an estimated 28 percent. In 1975, the albums retailed at £1.29. By 1986, the dealer price had increased to £2.12.

The first release, the 14-track compilation The World of Mantovani, was issued in September 1968 in a gatefold sleeve and priced at 17/6d. The album reached number six on the UK Albums Chart, while a second Mantovani volume made number 4 in 1969. Among the early entries in the series was The World of Johann Strauss (1969), the first of several releases that "treated classical music much like pop: compiling the most popular pieces and presenting them across two sides". By the end of 1969, 54 titles were available in the series.

Several releases spotlighted Decca's contemporary pop signings. The World of David Bowie (1970) was issued after Bowie left the label and features most of his 1967 debut album along with 1966 B-side "The London Boys" and three previously unreleased songs. Further releases were dedicated to Tom Jones, Lulu, Cat Stevens, Lynsey de Paul, the Zombies, Amen Corner, Alan Price, the Flirtations, Them and Billy Fury, among others. Seven The World of Hits albums featuring acts such as Small Faces, the Move and Thin Lizzy were issued between 1969 and 1974. Dedicated World of releases appeared for blues, soul, folk, easy listening, hard rock, country, music hall, television themes, sacred music and brass bands. Comedy releases featuring the Goons, Tony Hancock, Peter Cook and Dudley Moore, Benny Hill, Marty Feldman, the Goodies and Bernard Manning among others were also issued. In classical music, several The World of Your Hundred Best Tunes compilations were among the best-selling releases in the series, leading to the publication of a companion book by Alan Keith in 1975 "for the millions who have shown their needs by buying the discs".

Some albums in the series dropped the World of designation. These releases can be identified by their catalog numbers, which are prefixed SPA as with all others in the series. They include Nova Sampler (1970), comprising selections from Decca's short-lived progressive music series, I Thought Terry Dene Was Dead (1974), a companion to Dan Wooding's biography of the same title, and a 1975 reissue of The Cheerful Insanity of Giles, Giles and Fripp (1968). The release schedule slowed during the 1980s, with some of the final original albums appearing in 1986. The series inspired the title of Morrissey's World of Morrissey album, released in 1995. The World of... was revived in 2019 when five new titles were released to celebrate Decca’s 90th anniversary.

== Selected titles ==
- The World of Mantovani
- The World of the Bachelors
- The World of Val Doonican
- The World of Roberto Mann
- The World of Frank Chacksfield
- The World of Julie Felix
- A Whiter Shade – The World of Hits
- The World of Lulu
- The World of Max Bygraves
- The World of Johann Strauss
- The World of Kenneth McKellar
- The World of Vera Lynn
- The World of Blues Power
- The World of Charlie Kunz
- The World of Jimmy Young
- The World of Marianne Faithfull
- The World of Military Bands
- The World of Billy Cotton
- The World of Josef Locke Today
- The World of Waltz
- The Happy World of Tommy Steele
- The World of Noel Harrison
- The World of World War One: Oh, What a Lovely War
- The World of Oliver!
- The World of Reginald Dixon
- The World of British Comedy
- The World of Scotland
- The World of Wales in Song (Byd Cymru ar gân)
- The World of Josh White
- The Romantic World of Anthony Newley
- The World of Frank Ifield
- The World of John Mayall
- The World of Melachrino
- The World of George Formby
- The World of Winifred Atwell
- The World of Operetta
- The World of Ireland
- The Big Band World of Ted Heath
- The World of Ballet
- The World of David Bowie
- The World of Kenneth Williams
- Nova Sampler
- The World of Donald Peers
- The World of Alan Price
- The World of Gracie Fields
- The World of Kathy Kirby
- The World of the Zombies
- The World of Cat Stevens
- The World of Tijuana
- Come to the World of Dancing
- The World of Joan Sutherland
- The World of Steam
- The World of Christmas
- The World of Dudley Moore
- The World of Your Hundred Best Tunes: The Top Ten
- The World of Anton Karas and Harry Lime
- The World of Soul Power
- The World of the Beverley Sisters
- The World of Matt Monro
- The Crazy World of Marty Feldman
- The World of Harry Roy
- The World of Irish Dancing
- The World of East of Eden
- The World of James Bond Adventure
- The World of the Very Young
- The World of Dylan Thomas
- The World of Shakespeare
- The World of Dickie Valentine
- The World of the Spanish Guitar
- The World of Billy Fury
- The World of England
- The World of Motoring
- The World of Caterina Valente
- The Phase 4 World of Burt Bacharach
- The World of the Cinema Organ
- The World of Stanley Holloway
- The World of Children
- The World of Stars on Sunday
- The Lord's Taverners at the Mansion House
- The World of Lena Martell
- The World of the Grenadier Guards
- The World of Wally Whyton
- The World of the Tornados
- The World of Chris Barber
- The World of Russia
- The World of the Harpsichord
- The World of St John's
- The World of the Temperance Seven
- The World of the Hammond Organ
- The World of the Countryside
- The World of Rachmaninoff
- The World of Neapolitan Song
- The World at War
- The World of Elizabethan Music
- Favourite TV Themes
- The World of the Goodies
- The World of Two Pianos
- The World of Gerry Monroe
- The World of Ray Charles
- Birds in Music
- I Thought Terry Dene Was Dead
- The World of Liszt
- The World of the Sea
- The World of Dana
- The World of Schubert
- The World of Mendelssohn
- The World of Tony Hancock
- The World of the Yetties
- The Hit Making World of Blue Mink
- The World of Railways: G.W.R.
- The World of Verdi
- The World of Handel
- The World of Tom Jones
- The World of Engelbert Humperdinck
- The World of Max Boyce
- The World of Jacques Loussier Live
- The Wonderful World of Nursery Rhymes
- The Singing World of Bernard Manning
- The World of Hubert Gregg
- The Flamenco World of Paco Peña
- The Welsh World of Mary Hopkin
- The World of Classic Commercials
- The World of Bolero
- The World of the Goons
- The World of Peggy Ashcroft & John Gielgud
- The World of Elgar
- The World of Haydn
- The World of Vaughan Williams
