= Arriba! (album) =

Studio album by Caterina Valente and Silvio Francesco
- Released: 1959
- Genre: Pop, Latin
- Label: Decca, DL 4051 (Mono)

Professional ratings
Review scores
Source	Rating
AllMusic	3/5 stars

Arriba! is an album from Caterina Valente and Silvio Francesco, released in the US, 1959. It is sung in Spanish.

== Track listing ==
Side 1:

1. Quizas, Quizas, Quizas
2. Cha-Cha-Cha Flamenco
3. La Mucura
4. Una Aventura Mas
5. Aquellos Ojos Verdes
6. Somebody Bad Stole De Wedding Bell (Who's Got De Ding Dong)

Side 2:

1. Un Poquito De Tu Amor
2. El Manisero (The Peanut Vendor)
3. Noche De Ronda
4. Dos Cruces
5. Copacabana
6. Casa Da Lolo
