= Bonjour Kathrin (film) =

1956 film directed by Karl Anton

Bonjour, Kathrin
- German film poster
- Directed by: Karl Anton
- Written by: Karl Anton; Kurt Feltz; Peter Schubert; Fritz Böttger
- Based on: Die glücklichste Frau der Welt (operetta) by Kurt Feltz and Max Wallner
- Produced by: Hans Tost
- Starring: Caterina Valente; Peter Alexander
- Cinematography: Paul Krien
- Edited by: Jutta Hering
- Music by: Heinz Gietz
- Production company: Alfred Greven Film GmbH
- Distributed by: Prisma Film
- Release date: 31 January 1956
- Running time: 96 minutes
- Country: West Germany
- Language: German

Bonjour Kathrin (or Bonjour, Kathrin) is a 1956 West German musical film directed by Karl Anton and starring Caterina Valente, Peter Alexander and Silvio Francesco. It is based on the operetta Die glücklichste Frau der Welt by Max Wallner and Kurt Feltz. It was shot in Eastmancolor at the Wiesbaden Studios in Hesse. The film's sets were designed by the art directors Andrej Andrejew and Helmut Nentwig.

== Cast ==
- Caterina Valente as Kathrin
- Peter Alexander as Pierre
- Silvio Francesco as Silvio
- Dietmar Schönherr as Duval
- Rudolf Vogel as Fogar
- Helen Vita as Denise
- Hans-Joachim Kulenkampff as Columbus
- Rolf Olsen as Lebaudi
- Sabine Hahn as Therese
- Kurt Edelhagen and his Orchestra as themselves

== Reception ==
The FSK gave the film a rating of "6 and up" and deemed it suitable for screening on public holidays.

The film premiered on 31 January 1956 at the Ufa-Palast in Essen.

== Bibliography ==
- Bock, Hans-Michael; Bergfelder, Tim, eds. (2009). The Concise Cinegraph: Encyclopaedia of German Cinema. New York: Berghahn Books. ISBN 978-1-57181-655-9.
