= Caterina Valente =

Italian-French singer and dancer (1931–2024)

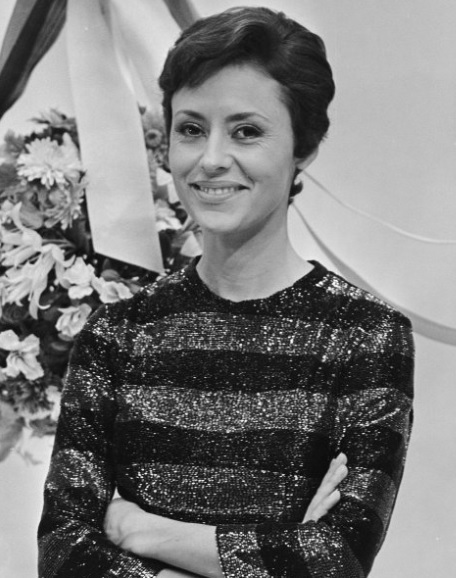
- Valente in 1966

Background information
- Born: Caterina Germaine Maria Valente; 14 January 1931; Paris, French Third Republic
- Died: 9 September 2024 (aged 93) Lugano, Ticino, Switzerland
- Occupations: Singer; musician; dancer
- Instruments: Vocals; acoustic guitar
- Years active: 1953–2003
- Labels: Polydor; Cetra; RCA Victor; Decca; Ariston; RCA Italiana; London; Durium
- Website: www.caterinavalente.com

Caterina Germaine Maria Valente (14 January 1931 – 9 September 2024) was an Italian-French multilingual singer, guitarist, and dancer. She spoke six languages and sang in thirteen. While she was best known as a performer in Europe, Valente spent part of her career in the United States, where she performed alongside Bing Crosby, Dean Martin, Perry Como, and Ella Fitzgerald, among others.

== Life and career ==
Caterina Valente was born in Paris on 14 January 1931 to Italian parents Giuseppe Valente (from San Biagio Saracinisco) and Maria Siri (born in Rome to a Genoese family). Her parents were musicians from a family that had been in show business for seven generations. Her mother was a varieté artist and a mime. The girl's first love was jazz; she listened to Duke Ellington, Sidney Bechet, Louis Armstrong, and Bessie Smith at home. When she listened to Billie Holiday first, at about age five, she cried and knew that she wanted to become a singer. She was trained in ballet early. She toured with her parents in the 1930s, sometimes appearing on stage; her career began in 1936 at the Friedrichsbau theatre in Stuttgart. She appeared as guitarist in a family sextet with her parents and three siblings.

When World War II began, the family toured in Switzerland and could not return to Paris. They accepted an engagement in Germany to survive. They had to help with troop support. At age 13 she experienced the bombing of Breslau, helping to rescue victims and care for them; she later described it as hell, trying to rescue a person and finding severed body parts. They returned to France after stays in several Russian camps. She worked there as a freelance singer in clubs, performing chansons, some composed by Gilbert Becaud for her.

Grock, the clown who ran the circus in which her husband worked, encouraged her to appear with a singing number. A first record was produced by Walo Linder of Radio Zürich and distributed to other stations.

In 1953 she auditioned with Kurt Edelhagen, band leader at the broadcaster Süddeutscher Rundfunk in Germany at the time, for one hour in several languages. He said that she was the most musical woman he had ever heard. Edelhagen, composer Heinz Gietz, and lyricist and producer Kurt Feltz organized her first recording on 29 March 1954—a jazz number "Istanbul". It was a flop, and Feltz convinced her that Schlager was more popular. "O Mama, O Mama, O Mamajo" became an immediate success.

"Ganz Paris träumt von der Liebe", a German version of Cole Porter's "I Love Paris", became a hit and her breakthrough, selling 500,000 copies in 1955 and more than 900,000 by December 1958, according to Der Spiegel's report of January 1959. She produced the track "Malaguena" with conductor Werner Müller in Berlin, which became successful in the United States and led to her first foreign television appearance.

In 1955 she was featured on The Colgate Comedy Hour with Gordon MacRae. From 1957 she appeared on television in the first German personality show, Bonsoir, Kathrin, which ran until 1964. She soon starred with Peter Alexander; the two became regarded as a dream couple. Her brother, the Italian musician, singer and film actor Silvio Francesco, performed with her singing many duets, dancing, and playing the clarinet in the shadow of his famous sister. Valente spoke six languages fluently and sang in thirteen. Valente's single, "The Breeze and I", sold more than one million copies per a report from 1978, making it her best-selling record. It was published by the German Polydor label. At the end of 1958 this collaboration was terminated and she switched to Teldec Telefunken-Decca Schallplatten.

In 1958 she filmed the musical comedy Hier bin ich – hier bleib ich (Here I Am, Here I Stay), which featured a guest appearance by Bill Haley & His Comets. During Haley's segment Valente sang a duet with him on a newly recorded version of his song "Vive la Rock and Roll". She was nominated for a Grammy Award for "La strada dell'amore" in 1959. She took part in The Perry Como Show from 1961 to 1966, appearing eight times. She first performed on stage in Las Vegas in 1964 and had her own show on Broadway.

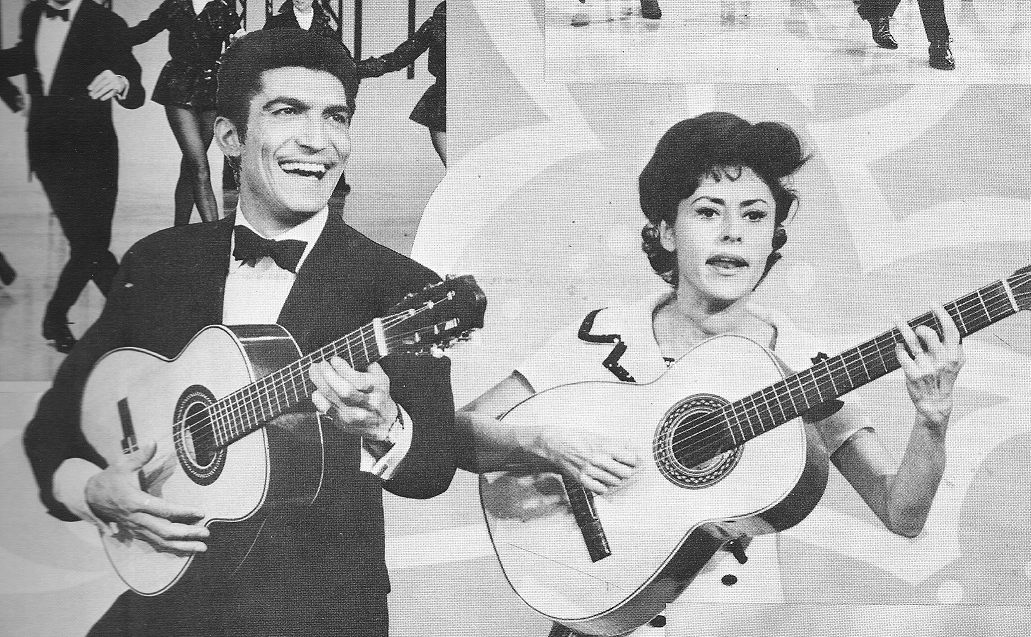
Valente and Sergio Franchi on Meredith Willson's Texaco Star Parade, 1964

In the mid-1960s Valente worked with Claus Ogerman and recorded material in both Italian and English that he arranged/conducted and/or composed on the Decca and London labels. From 1964 to 1965 she was a co-host (with Carol Burnett and initially Bob Newhart) of The Entertainers, a 22-episode CBS variety show for which she was recognised as the best female vocalist on American television with the Fame Award. She was a frequent guest on The Dean Martin Show. Valente also made three appearances on the Ed Sullivan Show. In 1968 she was the first entertainer to receive the Order of Merit of the Federal Republic of Germany.

Over the years she performed with many international stars including Chet Baker, Count Basie, Johnny Carson, Bing Crosby, Tommy Dorsey Orchestra, Sy Oliver, Buddy Rich Benny Goodman, Woody Herman, Danny Kaye, Dean Martin, Claus Ogerman, and Edmundo Ros. Recordings remained rare because of conflicting rights of labels.

In 1970 Valente appeared in the Royal Variety Performance at the London Palladium singing "Before the Parade Passes By" and "The Breeze and I". In Germany she performed on more than 100 television shows (such as Musik ist Trumpf), presented the series Circus, Circus, and hosted her own show Wünsche, die ich mir erfülle from 1981. Bravo, Catrin, a 1986 show in German marking her 50th anniversary on stage, was seen by about 17 million people.

A briglia sciolta, an Italian jazz CD recorded in 1989 and re-released in later years under the titles Fantastica and Platinum deluxe, was her best-selling CD worldwide. In 2001 she released a new album, Girltalk, with harpist Catherine Michel. Valente retired in 2003.

In 2019 her hit song from 1959, "Bongo Cha Cha Cha", was included on the soundtrack of Spider-Man: Far from Home (directed by Jon Watts), becoming viral and rising to new popularity. In 2021 the song went viral on social media platform TikTok, thanks to its use in a video trend that has amassed over 250 million views. The trend originated from Latin countries and South America and then became popular in Italy and Germany.

=== Personal life ===
Valente was first married to the German juggler Gerd Scholz from 1951 to 1971. He was also her manager. They had a son in 1958.

Her second husband was the pianist Roy Budd, with whom she had one son.

Valente died at home in Lugano, Switzerland, on 9 September 2024 at the age of 93.

== Recordings ==
Valente's recordings are listed by the Discography of American Historical Recordings. She recorded 1,500 songs, chansons and Schlager, performed in 13 languages.

=== Albums ===
==== United States ====
- The Hi-Fi Nightingale, 1956 (Decca DL 8203)
- Olé Caterina, 1957 (Decca DL-8436)
- Plenty Valente!, 1957 (Decca DL 8440) with Sy Oliver and his orchestra
- A Toast to the Girls, 1958 (Decca DL 8755)
- Schlagerparade 1958 (Decca DL 8852)
- À la Carte – Caterina Valente Sings in French, 1959 (Decca DL 4050)
- Arriba!, 1959 (Decca DL 4051)
- More Schlagerparade 1960 (Decca DL 4035)
- Fire & Frenzy – Caterina Valente & Edmundo Ros Orchestra, 1960 (London SW 99019)
- Classics with a Chaser, 1960 (RCA Victor LPM-2119)
- The Greatest... in Any Language!, 1961 (Decca DL 4052)
- Super-Fonics, 1961 (RCA LSP-2241)
- I Wish You Love, 1962 (London PS 275), elsewhere released as Great Continental Hits, Decca
- Strictly U.S.A., 1962 (London LL 3307)
- I Happen to Like New York, 1964 (London LL 3362)
- Valente & Violins, 1964 (London 3363)
- Golden Favorites, 1964 (Decca DL-4504) compilation
- The Intimate Valente, 1966. London LL 3473
- Sweet Beat, 1968 (London PS 536)
- Silk 'N' Latin – Caterina Valente with Edmundo Ros & His Orchestra, 1969 (London 44125)

==== Brazil ====
- Caterina – A Cosmopolita, Polydor 46065

==== Peru ====
- Caterina Cherie, 1959. Polydor 46310

==== Argentina ====
- Una Cita Con Caterina Valente (A Date With Caterina Valente), 1955. Polydor 24011, 10 inch LP
- Olé, Caterina! 1956. (Polydor 25019)
- Un Brindis para las Muchachas (Polydor 25048)
- Bueno... Clásico... y Popular! (Classics with a Chaser) ca. 1960. (RCA Victor LPM-2119)
- Classics with a Chaser 1960. (RCA Victor LPM-2119)

==== Colombia ====
- Cosmopolitan Lady 1958. (Polydor 46065)
- A Toast To The Girls 1958. (Polydor 46074)

==== United Kingdom ====
- Great Continental Hits, 1962. Decca LK 4508
- Valente In Swingtime, 1963. Decca SKL 4537
- I Happen to Like New York, 1964. Decca LK 4630
- Caterina Valente's Greatest Hits, 1965. Decca LK 4737
- Nothing But Aces – Caterina Valente & Edmundo Ros, 1969. Decca PFS.4157
- The World of Caterina Valente, 1971. Decca SPA 192

==== Australia ====
- I Happen to Like New York, 1964. World Record Club S/4384,
- The Best of Caterina Valente, 1967. SUMMIT Karussell SRA 250–548 (on the cover)/2430 032 (on the label)

==== West Germany ====
- A Date With Caterina Valente, 1955. Polydor 45 517
- Plenty Valente!, 1957. Polydor LPHM 43.037
- Olé Caterina!, 1957. Polydor 46 029 LPHM
- Weltschlager mit Caterina Valente, 1959. Polydor Sonderauflage Bertelsmann J 53503, 10 inch LP
- Super-Fonics, 1959. RCA LSP-2241
- Konzert für Frack und Petticoat – Classics with a Chaser, 1960. RCA LSP-2119
- Caterina in Italia, 1961. Decca BLK 16211-P
- Caterina Valente & Silvio Francesco: Deutsche Evergreens, 1961. Decca SLK 16 189 P
- Caterina on Tour, 1962. Decca BLK 16213-P with Heinz Kiessling
- Ihre großen Erfolge, 1962. Polydor.
- Pariser Chic, Pariser Charme, 1963. Decca SLK 16266 P
- Caterina Valente & Edmundo Ros: Latein Amerikanische Rhythmen, 1964. Decca BLK 16184-P
- I Happen to Like New York, 1964. Decca SLK 16 290 with John Keating and Orchestra
- Wenn es Nacht wird in den Städten, 1965. Decca SLK 16 345
- Bonjour Kathrin – Caterina Valente präsentiert ihre größten Erfolge, 1965 compilation. Amiga
- Bonjour Kathrin, Karussell, 1965 compilation. Amiga 635 106
- Tanz mit Catrin, 1965. HÖR ZU TELDEC HZT 514
- The Best Of Caterina Valente, 1967 compilation. Polydor 184047
- Die großen Erfolge 1967. Decca ND 103, Stereo
- Happy Caterina, 1967. Decca SLK 16485-P
- Portrait in Music, 1968 compilation. Decca SLK 16 420-P
- Schlager, Lieder & Chansons, 1968. Decca ND 182
- Schlager, Lieder & Chansons 2, 1969. Decca ND 557
- Caterina Valente & Edmundo Ros: Olé Mambo, 1969. Decca 79 505
- Caterina Valente & Edmundo Ros: Latin together, 1970. Decca SLK 16849-P
- Ganz Paris träumt von der Liebe – Caterina Valente singt ihre Welterfolge, 1970. Karussell
- Ich wär so gern bei Dir, 1980 compilation. Polydor 2459 504

==== Japan ====
- Cosmopolitan Lady, 10 inch LP
- Caterina Latin Album, 1963
- De Luxe Latin Album, 1966

==== South Africa ====
- Latein Amerikanische Rhythmen, 1960
- Du bist Musik, 1956 (45106 LPH – Polydor Sternchen)

== Films ==
Valente's films include:

- Große Starparade (The Big Star Parade, 1954)
- Ball im Savoy (Ball at the Savoy, 1955)
- Liebe, Tanz und 1000 Schlager (Love, Dance and a Thousand Songs, 1955)
- Bonjour Kathrin (1956)
- Du bist Musik (You are music, 1956)
- Das einfache Mädchen (The Simple Girl, 1957)
- Und abends in die Scala (1958)
- Hier bin ich, hier bleib ich (Here I Am, Here I Stay, 1959)
- Du bist wunderbar (1959)
- Schneewittchen und die 7 Gaukler (Snow White and the Seven Jugglers, 1962)

== Awards ==
- 1959: Grammy Nomination for Best Vocal Performance, Female La Strada Del Amore
- 1961: Bravo Otto, "Female singers" Gold (also 1960, 1962 and 1963 in Silver)
- 1965: "FAME Award", US
- 1966: Goldene Kamera, West Germany
- 1986: Commander's Cross of the Order of Merit of the Federal Republic of Germany
- 1991: Goldene Europa "Lifetime-Award", Saarbrücken, Germany
- 1995: Bambi "Lifetime-Award", Germany
- 2002: Echo Music Prize, "Lifetime-Award" Germany
- 2005: Honorary Bambi, Germany
