= Shadow Man (song) =

Song by David Bowie

Song by David Bowie
- Released: 14 June 2024
- Recorded: 15 November 1971
- Studio: Trident, London
- Genre: Folk
- Length: 4:02
- Label: Parlophone
- Songwriter: David Bowie
- Producers: David Bowie, Ken Scott

"Shadow Man" is a song written by the English singer-songwriter David Bowie. It was recorded on 15 November 1971 at Trident Studios in London during the sessions for The Rise and Fall of Ziggy Stardust and the Spiders from Mars (1972) and left unreleased until 2024 on the Rock 'n' Roll Star! box set. A folk ballad, the lyrics discuss topics of self-identity and doubling, and the impact one's present self has on their future lives, themes some linked to the Shadow concepts of Carl Jung.

Almost thirty years later, Bowie rerecorded the song for the Toy project in 2000. After the project's shelving, the remake saw release as a B-side in 2002, while different mixes appeared in 2006 and 2011. Ten years later in 2021, Toy was officially released as part of the Brilliant Adventure (1992–2001) box set. The Toy version of "Shadow Man" was praised by critics for its music and Bowie's vocal performance.

== Original version ==
David Bowie recorded an unfinished version of "Shadow Man" at Trident Studios in London during the sessions for The Rise and Fall of Ziggy Stardust and the Spiders from Mars on 15 November 1971, the same day as "It's Gonna Rain Again" and the final take of "Five Years". The recording was co-produced by Bowie and Ken Scott and featured contributions from Bowie's backing band the Spiders from Mars—Mick Ronson (guitar), Trevor Bolder (bass) and Woody Woodmansey (drums). It remained unreleased until 2024, when a composite of two different takes from the Ziggy sessions was included on the Rock 'n' Roll Star! box set, with new reverb from Scott.

Lyrically, "Shadow Man" discusses themes of self-identity and doubling, as well as the impact one's present self has on their future lives; Bowie explained in 1989 that "it's a reference to one's own shadow self". In 2015, artist Tanja Stark explicitly linked the song to Carl Jung's concept of the Shadow, a central theme in depth psychology that she argues reoccurs throughout Bowie's creative practice. This component of the psyche has a dual capacity, from a Jungian perspective, to be "foe" or "friend". In this framework, the "girl up ahead who knows" in the lyric could represent the role of the anima. In a later writeup, Helen Brown of The Independent noted that as its author was "on the verge of developing so many alter egos", one can suspect the "shadow man" to be the young "shy, suburban Davy Jones lurking behind his extreme, stagey persona". Bowie's biographers have noted the track's similar introspective and melancholic themes to Space Oddity-era tracks like "Wild Eyed Boy from Freecloud" (1969) and "Conversation Piece" (1970), or the unreleased "Time of My Life".

Musically, the song is a folk ballad that, like other Bowie compositions of the time, is influenced by songwriter Biff Rose's The Thorn in Mrs. Rose's Side (1968), particularly its closing track "The Man"; Bowie also covered the same album's "Fill Your Heart" on 1971's Hunky Dory. The author Peter Doggett compares its sound to the Rolling Stones in 1971 – "elongated southern (US) vocals and swaggering power chords". The biographer Chris O'Leary believes its style and lyrical content would have been unfit for the Ziggy Stardust album.

== Toy version ==
"Shadow Man"

Song by David Bowie

from the album Toy
- Released: 19 November 2021
- Recorded: July–October 2000
- Studio: Sear Sound and Looking Glass, New York City
- Length: 4:40
- Label: ISO; Parlophone
- Songwriter: David Bowie
- Producers: David Bowie, Mark Plati

Almost thirty years later, Bowie re-recorded "Shadow Man" during the sessions for the Toy project between July and October 2000, along with other tracks he wrote and recorded between 1964 and 1971, including "Conversation Piece". The lineup consisted of the members of Bowie's then-touring band: guitarist Earl Slick, bassist Gail Ann Dorsey, pianist Mike Garson, musician Mark Plati and drummer Sterling Campbell. With co-production from Bowie and Plati, the band rehearsed the songs at Sear Sound Studios in New York City before recording them as live tracks. Plati stated that he refused to listen to Bowie's original recordings of the tracks, so to prevent the originals from influencing his playing on the new versions. Overdubs were recorded at New York's Looking Glass Studios. For "Shadow Man", Bowie slowed the tempo down and added a string section arranged by Visconti, giving it, in O'Leary's words, "a dreamy, languid atmosphere".

Toy was initially intended for release in March 2001, before it was shelved by EMI/Virgin due to financial issues. So, Bowie departed the label and recorded his next album Heathen (2002). The remake of "Shadow Man" subsequently appeared as on some formats of the "Slow Burn" single in 2002 and as a B-side of "Everyone Says 'Hi'" in the UK. In 2006, Garson posted a different mix on his MySpace page, featuring brighter acoustic guitar and different vocal effects. Yet another mix was leaked online in March 2011, attracting media attention. In his book The Complete David Bowie, Pegg praises the Toy remake as "outstanding" and for Bowie's vocal performance, summarising: "After thirty years in the wilderness, 'Shadow Man' was brought to fruition in one of the most beautiful recordings of Bowie's career." Meanwhile, author Paul Trynka describes the track as "a near masterpiece": an "obscure, largely forgotten work [that] illustrated the quality and breadth of the song catalogue [Bowie had] built up over the 35 years." Mojo magazine also listed the Toy recording as Bowie's 71st best song in 2015.

On 29 September 2021, Warner Music Group announced that Toy would get an official release on 26 November as part of the box set Brilliant Adventure (1992–2001) through ISO and Parlophone. A separate deluxe edition, titled Toy:Box, was released on 7 January 2022, containing two new mixes of the song: an "alternative mix" and an "Unplugged and Somewhat Slightly Electric" mix, featuring new guitar parts by Plati and Slick. The "Unplugged and Somewhat Slightly Electric" mix of "Shadow Man" was released as a single on streaming services on 6 January. Reviewing Toy, The Guardian's Alexis Petridis praised "Shadow Man" as one of the album's highlights, calling it "an impossibly beautiful piano ballad". In The Independent, Brown declared Bowie's vocal performance the album's "most theatrical", further calling it "wolflike".

== Personnel ==
According to Chris O'Leary:

Original version

- David Bowie – lead vocal, 12-string acoustic guitar
- Mick Ronson – electric guitar, piano
- Trevor Bolder – bass guitar
- Mick Woodmansey – drums

Technical

- David Bowie – producer
- Ken Scott – producer, engineer
- Dennis MacKay – engineer

Toy version

- David Bowie – lead vocal
- Earl Slick – "ambient" guitar
- Mark Plati – acoustic guitar
- Mike Garson – keyboards
- Gail Ann Dorsey – bass, vocals
- Sterling Campbell – drums
- Lisa Germano – violin
- Unknown musicians – strings
- Tony Visconti – string arrangement

Technical

- David Bowie – producer
- Mark Plati – producer
- Pete Keppler – engineer
