= Brilliant Adventure (1992–2001) =

2021 box set by David Bowie

Box set by David Bowie
- Released: 26 November 2021
- Recorded: April 1992 – November 2000
- Genres: Art rock; experimental rock; industrial rock; electronica
- Label: Parlophone
- Producer: Various

David Bowie chronology
| David Bowie at the Kit Kat Klub (Live New York 99) (2021) | Brilliant Adventure (1992–2001) (2021) | Toy (2021) |

Professional ratings
Aggregate scores
| Source | Rating |
|---|---|
| Metacritic | 81/100 |
Review scores
| Source | Rating |
| AllMusic | 4/5 stars |
| Mojo | 4/5 stars |
| Pitchfork | 7.6/10 |
| Record Collector | 4/5 stars |
| The Telegraph | 4/5 stars |
| Uncut | 4/5 stars |
| Variety | 92/100 |

Brilliant Adventure (1992–2001) is a box set by English singer-songwriter David Bowie, released on 26 November 2021. A follow-up to the compilations Five Years (1969–1973), Who Can I Be Now? (1974–1976), A New Career in a New Town (1977–1982) and Loving the Alien (1983–1988), the set covers the period of Bowie's career from 1992 to 2001, commonly regarded by analysts as an artistic renaissance following his commercially successful but critically maligned work in the 1980s. However, Bowie's 1988–1992 tenure with the hard rock group Tin Machine is excluded. The set comprises eleven compact discs or 18 LPs. It was followed by I Can't Give Everything Away (2002–2016) in 2025 as the final era boxset.

== Overview ==
Exclusive to the set are BBC Radio Theatre, a live album showcasing Bowie's uncut BBC Radio Theatre live show in 2000 (previously documented in an edited form on Bowie at the Beeb) and Re:Call 5, the fifth installment in the retrospective boxes' exclusive rarities compilations. The latter includes non-album and soundtrack singles, single edits, and B-sides.

The set contains remastered versions of Bowie's studio albums Black Tie White Noise, The Buddha of Suburbia, Outside, Earthling, and Hours (1993–1999). The remastered albums were released individually in August 2022. Also featured is a finalized version of Toy, an album of re-recordings that was produced in late 2000 and set for release in 2001, only to be shelved due to Virgin Records viewing it as commercially unviable in the wake of a financial downturn for the company. An alternate version of Toy, containing prototypes of the Heathen tracks "Slip Away" and "Afraid" but excluding "Can't Help Thinking About Me" and "Karma Man", had leaked in 2011. Toy was released not only on the box set, but also as an expanded three-CD release on 7 January 2022, titled Toy:Box, including alternate mixes and outtakes. Both configurations include cover art originally proposed by Bowie for the planned 2001 release, depicting his adult face superimposed on one of his baby photos.

Like previous box sets in the "era" series, Brilliant Adventure (1992–2001) includes a hardcover book, spanning 84 pages in the CD release and 128 in the vinyl release, containing rare and newly-published photos from the covered period by a variety of photographers. The book also contains memorabilia scans, writeups by collaborators Brian Eno, Nile Rodgers, Reeves Gabrels, and Mark Plati, and a newly-conducted interview with Erdal Kızılçay, who had collaborated with Bowie throughout the late '80s and on both The Buddha of Suburbia and Outside.

== Track listing ==
=== Black Tie White Noise (2021 remaster) ===
All tracks are written by David Bowie, except where noted.

Black Tie White Noise track listing
| No. | Title | Lyrics | Music | Length |
|---|---|---|---|---|
| 1. | "The Wedding" | instrumental | | 5:04 |
| 2. | "You've Been Around" | | Bowie, Reeves Gabrels | 4:45 |
| 3. | "I Feel Free" (featuring Mick Ronson) | Pete Brown | Jack Bruce | 4:52 |
| 4. | "Black Tie White Noise" (featuring Al B. Sure!) | | | 4:52 |
| 5. | "Jump They Say" | | | 4:22 |
| 6. | "Nite Flights" | Noel Scott Engel | Engel | 4:30 |
| 7. | "Pallas Athena" | | | 4:40 |
| 8. | "Miracle Goodnight" | | | 4:14 |
| 9. | "Don't Let Me Down & Down" | Tahra Mint Hembara, trans. Martine Valmont | Hembara | 4:55 |
| 10. | "Looking for Lester" | instrumental | Bowie, Nile Rodgers | 5:36 |
| 11. | "I Know It's Gonna Happen Someday" | Morrissey | Mark E. Nevin | 4:14 |
| 12. | "The Wedding Song" | | | 4:29 |
| Total length: | | | | 56:33 |

=== The Buddha of Suburbia (2021 remaster) ===
All tracks are written by David Bowie.

The Buddha of Suburbia track listing
| No. | Title | Length |
|---|---|---|
| 1. | "The Buddha of Suburbia" | 4:28 |
| 2. | "Sex and the Church" | 6:25 |
| 3. | "South Horizon" | 5:26 |
| 4. | "The Mysteries" | 7:12 |
| 5. | "Bleed Like a Craze, Dad" | 5:22 |
| 6. | "Strangers When We Meet" | 4:58 |
| 7. | "Dead Against It" | 5:48 |
| 8. | "Untitled No. 1" | 5:01 |
| 9. | "Ian Fish, U.K. Heir" | 6:27 |
| 10. | "The Buddha of Suburbia (ft. Lenny Kravitz on Guitar)" | 4:19 |
| Total length: | | 55:26 |

=== Outside (2021 remaster) ===
All lyrics are written by David Bowie; all music is composed by David Bowie and Brian Eno, except where noted.

Outside track listing
| No. | Title | Music | Sung from the perspective of | Length |
|---|---|---|---|---|
| 1. | "Leon Takes Us Outside" | Bowie, Brian Eno, Reeves Gabrels, Mike Garson, Erdal Kızılçay, Sterling Campbell | Leon Blank | 1:25 |
| 2. | "Outside" | Bowie, Kevin Armstrong | prologue | 4:04 |
| 3. | "The Hearts Filthy Lesson" | Bowie, Eno, Gabrels, Garson, Kızılçay, Campbell | Detective Nathan Adler | 4:57 |
| 4. | "A Small Plot of Land" | Bowie, Eno, Gabrels, Garson, Kızılçay, Campbell | The residents of Oxford Town, New Jersey | 6:36 |
| 5. | "Segue – Baby Grace (A Horrid Cassette)" | Bowie, Eno, Gabrels, Garson, Kızılçay, Campbell | Baby Grace Blue | 1:39 |
| 6. | "Hallo Spaceboy" | | Paddy | 5:14 |
| 7. | "The Motel" | Bowie | Leon Blank | 6:49 |
| 8. | "I Have Not Been to Oxford Town" | | Leon Blank | 3:47 |
| 9. | "No Control" | | Detective Nathan Adler | 4:33 |
| 10. | "Segue – Algeria Touchshriek" | Bowie, Eno, Gabrels, Garson, Kızılçay, Campbell | Algeria Touchshriek | 2:03 |
| 11. | "The Voyeur of Utter Destruction (as Beauty)" | Bowie, Eno, Gabrels | The Artist/Minotaur | 4:21 |
| 12. | "Segue – Ramona A. Stone/I Am with Name" | Bowie, Eno, Gabrels, Garson, Kızılçay, Campbell | Ramona A. Stone and her acolytes | 4:01 |
| 13. | "Wishful Beginnings" | | The Artist/Minotaur | 5:08 |
| 14. | "We Prick You" | | Members of the Court of Justice | 4:33 |
| 15. | "Segue – Nathan Adler" | Bowie, Eno, Gabrels, Garson, Kızılçay, Campbell | Detective Nathan Adler | 1:00 |
| 16. | "I'm Deranged" | | The Artist/Minotaur | 4:31 |
| 17. | "Thru' These Architects Eyes" | Bowie, Gabrels | Leon Blank | 4:22 |
| 18. | "Segue – Nathan Adler" | | Detective Nathan Adler | 0:28 |
| 19. | "Strangers When We Meet" | Bowie | Leon Blank | 5:07 |
| Total length: | | | | 74:36 |

=== Earthling (2021 remaster) ===
All lyrics are written by David Bowie; all music is composed by Bowie, Reeves Gabrels and Mark Plati, except where noted.

Earthling' track listing
| No. | Title | Music | Length |
|---|---|---|---|
| 1. | "Little Wonder" | | 6:02 |
| 2. | "Looking for Satellites" | | 5:21 |
| 3. | "Battle for Britain (The Letter)" | | 4:48 |
| 4. | "Seven Years in Tibet" | Bowie, Gabrels | 6:22 |
| 5. | "Dead Man Walking" | Bowie, Gabrels | 6:50 |
| 6. | "Telling Lies" | Bowie | 4:49 |
| 7. | "The Last Thing You Should Do" | | 4:57 |
| 8. | "I'm Afraid of Americans" | Bowie, Brian Eno | 5:00 |
| 9. | "Law (Earthlings on Fire)" | Bowie, Gabrels | 4:48 |
| Total length: | | | 48:57 |

=== Hours (2021 remaster) ===
All tracks are written by David Bowie and Reeves Gabrels; except "What's Really Happening?", with lyrics by Alex Grant.

Hours track listing
| No. | Title | Length |
|---|---|---|
| 1. | "Thursday's Child" | 5:24 |
| 2. | "Something in the Air" | 5:46 |
| 3. | "Survive" | 4:11 |
| 4. | "If I'm Dreaming My Life" | 7:04 |
| 5. | "Seven" | 4:04 |
| 6. | "What's Really Happening?" | 4:10 |
| 7. | "The Pretty Things Are Going to Hell" | 4:40 |
| 8. | "New Angels of Promise" | 4:35 |
| 9. | "Brilliant Adventure" | 1:54 |
| 10. | "The Dreamers" | 5:14 |
| Total length: | | 47:06 |

=== BBC Radio Theatre, London, June 27, 2000 ===
All tracks are written by David Bowie.

Disc one
| No. | Title | Length |
|---|---|---|
| 1. | "Wild Is The Wind" | 6:22 |
| 2. | "Ashes to Ashes" | 5:05 |
| 3. | "Seven" | 4:15 |
| 4. | "This Is Not America" | 3:47 |
| 5. | "Absolute Beginners" | 6:35 |
| 6. | "Always Crashing In The Same Car" | 4:10 |
| 7. | "Survive" | 4:58 |
| 8. | "The London Boys" | 3:57 |
| 9. | "I Dig Everything" | 4:58 |
| 10. | "Little Wonder" | 3:51 |
| Total length: | | 43:00 |

Disc two
| No. | Title | Length |
|---|---|---|
| 1. | "The Man Who Sold The World" | 3:59 |
| 2. | "Fame" | 4:15 |
| 3. | "Stay" | 5:47 |
| 4. | "Hallo Spaceboy" | 5:22 |
| 5. | "Cracked Actor" | 4:12 |
| 6. | "I'm Afraid of Americans" | 5:33 |
| 7. | "All The Young Dudes" | 3:42 |
| 8. | "Starman" | 4:31 |
| 9. | ""Heroes"" | 5:43 |
| 10. | "Let's Dance" | 6:18 |
| Total length: | | 49:22 |

=== Toy ===
All tracks are written by David Bowie.

Toy track listing
| No. | Title | Original version on | Length |
|---|---|---|---|
| 1. | "I Dig Everything" | Single from 1966, Early On (1964–1966) | 5:03 |
| 2. | "You've Got a Habit of Leaving" | Single from 1965, Early On (1964–1966) | 4:48 |
| 3. | "The London Boys" | B-side of 1966 single "Rubber Band", The World of David Bowie | 3:47 |
| 4. | "Karma Man" | The World of David Bowie | 3:46 |
| 5. | "Conversation Piece" | B-side of "The Prettiest Star", Five Years (1969–1973) | 3:53 |
| 6. | "Shadow Man" | Previously unreleased; originally recorded in 1971 during the sessions for Ziggy Stardust | 4:40 |
| 7. | "Let Me Sleep Beside You" | The World of David Bowie | 3:14 |
| 8. | "Hole in the Ground" | Conversation Piece (Home demo) | 3:32 |
| 9. | "Baby Loves That Way" | B-side of "You've Got a Habit of Leaving", Early On (1964–1966) | 4:37 |
| 10. | "Can't Help Thinking About Me" | Single from 1966, Early On (1964–1966) | 3:25 |
| 11. | "Silly Boy Blue" | David Bowie (1967) | 5:35 |
| 12. | "Toy (Your Turn to Drive)" | New piece intended for Toy - released as a digital download in 2003 | 4:16 |
| Total length: | | | 50:36 |

=== Re:Call 5 ===
Disc one:

1. "Real Cool World" (Sounds from the Cool World Soundtrack Version)
2. "Jump They Say" (7" version)
3. "Lucy Can't Dance"
4. "Black Tie White Noise" (featuring Al B. Sure!) (Radio Edit)
5. "Don't Let Me Down & Down" (Indonesian Vocal Version)
6. "Buddha of Suburbia" (Single Version) (featuring Lenny Kravitz on guitar)
7. "The Hearts Filthy Lesson" (Radio Edit)
8. "Nothing to Be Desired"
9. "Strangers When We Meet" (edit)
10. "Get Real"
11. "The Man Who Sold the World" (Live Eno Mix)
12. "I'm Afraid of Americans" (Showgirls Soundtrack Version)
13. "Hallo Spaceboy" (Pet Shop Boys Remix)
14. "I Am with Name" (Alternative Version)
15. "A Small Plot of Land" (Long Basquiat Soundtrack Version)

Disc two:

1. "Little Wonder" (Edit)
2. "A Fleeting Moment" (a.k.a. Seven Years In Tibet – Mandarin Version)
3. "Dead Man Walking" (Edit)
4. "Seven Years in Tibet" (Edit)
5. "Planet of Dreams" – David Bowie and Gail Ann Dorsey
6. "I'm Afraid of Americans" (V1 – Edit)
7. "I Can't Read" (The Ice Storm Long Version)
8. "A Foggy Day in London Town" – David Bowie and Angelo Badalamenti
9. "Fun" (BowieNet Mix)
10. "The Pretty Things Are Going to Hell" (Stigmata Soundtrack Version)
11. "Thursday's Child" (Radio Edit)
12. "We All Go Through"
13. "No One Calls"

Disc three:

1. "We Shall Go to Town"
2. "1917"
3. "The Pretty Things Are Going to Hell" (Edit)
4. "Thursday's Child" (Omikron: The Nomad Soul Version)
5. "New Angels of Promise" (Omikron: The Nomad Soul Version)
6. "The Dreamers" (Omikron: The Nomad Soul Version)
7. "Seven" (Demo)
8. "Survive" (Marius de Vries mix)
9. "Something in the Air" (American Psycho Remix)
10. "Seven" (Marius de Vries Mix)
11. "Pictures of Lily"

== Charts ==
Chart performance for Brilliant Adventure (1992–2001)
| Chart (2021) | Peak position |
|---|---|
| Austrian Albums (Ö3 Austria) | 35 |
| Belgian Albums (Ultratop Flanders) | 33 |
| Belgian Albums (Ultratop Wallonia) | 28 |
| Dutch Albums (Album Top 100) | 58 |
| German Albums (Offizielle Top 100) | 23 |
| Irish Albums (IRMA) | 87 |
| Scottish Albums (Official Charts) | 18 |
| Swiss Albums (Schweizer Hitparade) | 40 |
| UK Albums (Official Charts) | 24 |
