= Kurt Feltz =

German poet (1910–1982)

Kurt Feltz (14 April 1910 in Krefeld, Germany – 3 August 1982 in Mallorca, Spain) was a highly prolific German poet and song lyricist.

== Selected filmography ==
- ...und die Musik spielt dazu (1943, based on Season in Salzburg)
- Lascia cantare il cuore (Italy, 1943, based on Season in Salzburg)
- Saison in Salzburg (1952, based on Season in Salzburg)
- Die Perle von Tokay (1954, based on Die Perle von Tokay)
- Bonjour Kathrin (1956, based on Die glücklichste Frau der Welt)
- Peter Shoots Down the Bird (1959)
- Saison in Salzburg (1961, based on Season in Salzburg)

=== Screenwriter ===
- Falstaff in Vienna (1940)
