= The World of David Bowie =

Compilation album by David Bowie
- Released: 6 March 1970
- Recorded: 1966–1968
- Genre: Rock, folk rock
- Length: 41:23
- Label: Decca
- Producer: Mike Vernon; Tony Visconti

David Bowie chronology
David Bowie (1969)	The World of David Bowie (1970)	The Man Who Sold the World (1970)

Professional ratings
Review scores
Source	Rating
AllMusic	3/5 stars

The World of David Bowie is a compilation album by the English singer-songwriter David Bowie, released on 6 March 1970 by Decca Records as part of their The World of... series following Bowie's success with the "Space Oddity" single. It primarily consists of material he recorded in 1967 for Decca subsidiary Deram, including all but four tracks from his debut album David Bowie, as well as three previously unreleased songs—"Karma Man", "Let Me Sleep Beside You" and "In the Heat of the Morning"—and the 1966 B-side "The London Boys". The track listing was approved by Bowie himself, while the sleeve photo was provided by David Bebbington. The album was reissued in April 1973 with a Ziggy Stardust-era sleeve photo.

== Track listing ==
All songs were written by David Bowie. Tracks 8, 10, and 13 were previously unreleased

Side one
No.	Title	Length
1.	"Uncle Arthur"	2:05
2.	"Love You till Tuesday"	3:08
3.	"There Is a Happy Land"	3:05
4.	"Little Bombardier"	3:22
5.	"Sell Me a Coat"	2:57
6.	"Silly Boy Blue"	3:47
7.	"The London Boys"	3:19

Side two
No.	Title	Length
8.	"Karma Man"	3:02
9.	"Rubber Band"	2:16
10.	"Let Me Sleep Beside You"	3:23
11.	"Come and Buy My Toys"	2:07
12.	"She's Got Medals"	2:23
13.	"In the Heat of the Morning"	2:57
14.	"When I Live My Dream"	3:22

== Personnel ==
- David Bowie – vocals, guitar
- John McLaughlin – guitar (on Side 2, Tracks 1 and 3)
- Herbie Flowers – bass
- Tony Visconti – bass, background vocals
- Barry Morgan or Andy White – drums
- Steve Peregrin-Took – pixiephone
- unidentified strings
