= Mosaic Theater Company of DC =

- Mosaic Theater Company of DC logo
- Formation: 2015
- Type: Theatre group
- Purpose: Inclusive theater - plays which bring a mix of communities together
- Location: Washington, D.C.
- Artistic director: Ari Roth (founding artistic director)
- Website: http://www.mosaictheater.org/

Mosaic Theater Company of DC is a non-profit theater company located in Washington DC. Founded by former Theater J artistic director Ari Roth in 2015, it performs at the Atlas Performing Arts Center on H Street NE in Washington D.C. Their proclaimed mission is to "make powerful, transformational, socially-relevant art, producing plays by authors on the frontlines of conflict zones and providing audiences with a dynamic new venue for the dramatizing and debating of ideas."

== History ==
Mosaic Theater Company was the result of a significant rift between founding artistic director Ari Roth and the leadership of the Washington, D.C. Jewish Community Center, where he had been artistic director of Theater J. Over 18 years, Roth transformed that company "from a rather undistinguished presenter of Jewish-themed work into one of the nation's most daring" theatres. As a result of his presenting plays which some regarded as looking critically at Israel, particularly his Voices from a Changing Middle East Festival, the relationship between Roth and the DCJCC leadership became strained. Eight months after they required Roth to downgrade the English-language world premiere of a controversial Israeli play The Admission by Motti Lerner from a 34-performance, full-production run in March to a 16 performance "workshop" run in April 2014, Roth was very publicly fired as the Theater J artistic director in December 2014. Mosaic announced plans to revive the Voices from a Changing Middle East Festival, including the presentation of I Shall Not Hate, the next play scheduled to be presented as part of the festival when it was canceled. Roth has been quoted as believing that this play was key to his firing from Theater J.

== Facilities ==
The Mosaic Theater Company performs primarily at the Atlas Performing Arts Center at 1333 H St NE. It also performs at other locations around the Washington metro area, such as the Kogod Cradle at the Arena Stage, the Woolly Mammoth Theater Company, and area universities.

== Past productions ==
=== Unexplored Interior ===
Unexplored Interior by Jay O. Sanders was the inaugural production of the company. Subtitled (This is Rwanda: The Beginning and the End of the Earth), it featured 14 projections using light and sound effects, and a symbolic set representing the Rwandan countryside. This production, including the formation of the new theater company, was mounted during a few days in the course of ten months following Ari Roth's controversial dismissal from Theater J for mounting just such shows.

2015-2016 season The Case for Hope in a Polarized World (debut season)

Unexplored Interior (This is Rwanda: The Beginning and the End of the Earth), by Jay O. Sanders
The Gospel of LovingKindness, by Marcus Gardley
When January Feels Like Summer, by Cori Thomas

Voices from a Changing Middle East Festival: The War Comes Home

Wrestling Jerusalem, written and performed by Aaron Davidman
I Shall Not Hate, based on the memoir by Izzeldin Abuelaish
Eretz Chadasha: The Promised Land, by Shachar Pinkhas and Shay Pitovsky
After the War, by Motti Lerner
Hkeelee (Talk to Me), by Leila Buck
