= Ari Roth =

American dramatist

Ari Roth (born January 10, 1961) is an American theatrical producer, playwright, director and educator.

From 2014 to 2020 Roth served as the artistic director of Mosaic Theater Company of DC and was formerly the artistic director of Theater J at the Washington, D.C. Jewish Community Center from 1997 to 2014. Over 18 seasons at Theater J, he produced more than 129 productions and created festivals including "Locally Grown: Community Supported Art," "Voices from a Changing Middle East", and Theater J's acclaimed "Beyond The Stage" and "Artistic Director's Roundtable" series. In 2010, Roth was named as one of the Forward 50, honoring nationally prominent "men and women who are leading the American Jewish community into the 21st century, and in 2017 he was given the DC Mayor's Arts Award for Visionary Leadership. In 2021, Roth launched a new partnership with A. Lorraine Robinson, founding Voices Festival Productions, to be the new home for his long-running "Voices From a Changing Middle East Festival." Their first public event was a virtual benefit in support of "Ukrainian Playwrights Under Siege" in partnership with the Arts Club of Washington.

In December 2014, Roth was dismissed as the artistic director of Theater J. Hundreds of noted figures in the world of American theater contested his termination; Tony Kushner called it "an act of political censorship." Specifically, it was said that Roth was fired due to his protesting the DCJCC cancelation of Theater J's "Voices from a Changing Middle East". Jeremy Gerard wrote: "It is absolutely clear that Roth was fired because of the content of the work he has so thoughtfully and ably championed for the last two decades." He also claimed that Roth was disciplined for "blatantly political reasons." The DCJCC denies that Roth's termination was political. Immediately following his departure from Theater J, Roth founded the Mosaic Theater Company of DC in December 2014. In November of 2020, in the midst of the pandemic, he resigned as Mosaic's artistic director after complaints from staff.

== Life ==
The son of German-born refugees of the Holocaust, Roth was born and raised in Chicago, where he graduated from the University of Chicago Laboratory High School. He studied playwriting at the University of Michigan with Milan Stitt (author of The Runner Stumbles) and Kenneth Thorpe Rowe (author of the textbook, Write that Play). Based on his playwriting, he received two Avery Hopwood Awards for Drama, the first in 1981 given by Arthur Miller, a noted UM alum and playwright (and student of Thorpe Rowe).

Roth is married to Kate Schecter, the CEO and president of World Neighbors. They have two daughters.

=== Teaching career ===
From 1988 to 1997, Roth was a lecturer for the University of Michigan's English and Theater departments, teaching playwriting and dramatic literature. He later taught in the Department of Theater Arts and the Genesis Institute at Brandeis University, and was an adjunct professor at New York University's Tisch School of the Arts. Roth has been a visiting professor in the Carnegie Mellon University School of Drama graduate program in Dramatic Writing, and a visiting writer at George Washington University.

Since 2006, Roth has taught a course in political theater in Washington, DC, for University of Michigan's "Michigan in Washington Program," University of San Francisco's "USFinDC Program" and University of California Berkeley's "Berkeley Washington Program".

=== Theater J ===
As artistic director of Theater J, Roth produced over 129 mainstage productions, including 44 world premieres, and 150 staged workshops and readings. He was credited since taking over in 1997 with leading Theater J to "national prominence as a home for edgy, politically charged plays – and for nurturing risky new works." The theater is a program of the Washington DCJCC with an Actors' Equity Small Professional Theatre Tier 7 Contract and membership in the League of Washington Theatres, Theater Communications Group, Cultural Alliance, and the Association for Jewish Theatre.

He was described as creating a "rare mix of professional polish, thoughtful dramaturgy and nervy experimentation – all in a spot just far enough off the New York radar for a playwright to relax." An article in The New York Times claimed that Roth helped to make Theater J the "premier theater for premieres." It produced new plays ranging from Joyce Carol Oates's The Tattooed Girl and Wendy Wasserstein's Welcome to My Rash and Third, to Robert Brustein's Spring Forward, Fall Back, Neena Beber's Jump/Cut, and Richard Greenberg's Bal Masque. In addition to season offerings, Roth led Theater J to become known for its discussion programming, Beyond the Stage. Peter Marks has described the Theater J post-show discussion format as "a chance to digest and puzzle out en masse, in an entirely exhilarating way."

=== Mosaic Theater Company of DC ===
Founded by Roth in 2014, Mosaic Theater Company of DC is dedicated to creating independent, intercultural, uncensored, socially relevant art. In 2017, Mosaic received the 2017 John Aniello Award for Outstanding Emerging Theatre Company from the Helen Hayes Awards. Past productions include: Jay O. Sanders' Unexplored Interior (This Is Rwanda), Motti Lerner's After The War, and Tearrance Chisholm's Hooded, Or Being Black For Dummies, along with the American Premieres of Izzeldin Abuelaish's I Shall Not Hate, Shay Pitovsky and Shahar Pinkhas' Promised Land, and Hanna Eady and Edward Mast's The Return, Philip Himberg's Paper Dolls, the World Premiere of Mona Mansour's The Vagrant Trilogy (which would move to The Public Theater with same creative nucleus in 2022) and Caleen Sinnette Jennings Queens Girl in Africa.

== Plays ==
In 1989 Roth was commissioned by Arena Stage to write a play based on Peter Sichrovsky's widely acclaimed book of interviews with the children and grandchildren of Nazis (Schuldig Geboren, serialized in Der Spiegel in 1987 and published in English in 1988 by Basic Books). Entitled Born Guilty, Roth's dramatic adaptation follows Sichrovsky as the Austrian Jewish journalist interviews children of Nazi and SS officials. Born Guilty had its world premiere in 1991, directed by Zelda Fichandler. The play was nominated for the 1992 Helen Hayes/Charles MacArthur Award for Outstanding New Play.

After further readings at Manhattan Theatre Club, Born Guilty had its Off-Broadway premiere in 1993 at the now-defunct American Jewish Theater. Jack Gelber directed a cast including Zach Grenier, Greg Germann, Lee Wilkof, Victor Slezak, Maggie Burke, Jennie Moreau, and Amy Wright. The New York Times called the play a "searing drama" and the production enjoyed a sold out, extended run.

Born Guilty had its Midwest premiere at Chicago's A Red Orchid Theatre in 1994. The production, directed by Shira Piven, later moved to the Famous Door Theatre Company at Jane Addams Hull House for an extended seven-month run, and received widespread critical praise. Since then, Born Guilty has enjoyed more than 40 national productions (including in Atlanta, Boston, Dallas, and San Francisco) and a radio broadcast by L.A. Theatre Works as part of its "Chicago Theatres on the Air" series.

Theater J's 2002 DC revival of Born Guilty was nominated for the Helen Hayes Award for Outstanding Resident Play; the director of the play, John Vreeke, was nominated for Outstanding Director. Excerpts of Born Guilty were featured on WFMT Chicago's The Studs Terkel Program and NPR's All Things Considered. It is featured in The Best Stage Scenes of 1993 (Smith and Kraus, Inc., 1994) and was published by Samuel French, Inc. in 1994.

A sequel to Born Guilty, The Wolf in Peter (originally, "Peter and the Wolf") is based on the political career of Peter Sichrovsky and his controversial partnership with Jörg Haider, leader of the Austrian Freedom Party. In this sequel, we follow the Adapter (a fictionalized version of Roth himself) as he sets off for Europe to discover why Schirovsky would align himself with such a controversial figure as Haider, who is often associated with anti-semitism.

The sequel premiered in 2002, when it was produced in repertory with Born Guilty at Theater J.

The play was developed further at Playwrights Theatre of New Jersey and Jewish Theatre of Austria, and produced in repertory in 2007 at Atlanta's Jewish Theatre of the South. In 2010 it was presented as a staged reading in New York at the Museum of Jewish Heritage by the Epic Theatre Ensemble and directed by Blanka Zizka, artistic director of the Wilma Theatre.

In 2013, Roth debuted a prequel to these two plays, "Andy and The Shadows" at Theater J, in a production directed by Daniella Topol. "Andy" focuses on a young filmmaker, the son of Holocaust refugees on the South Side of Chicago. Set in 1984 and loosely autobiographical, the protagonist grapples with questions of remembrance, history and identity that are touched upon in "Born Guilty" and "The Wolf in Peter." Originally developed as Giant Shadows, the play was recipient of the first Helen Eisner Award for Young Playwrights given by the Streisand Center for Jewish Culture (1987), and presented as a reading at L.A. Theatre Works (featuring Bruce Norris); Victory Gardens Theater (directed by Michael Greif); and the American Jewish Theatre (directed again by Greif). In 1988 Evan Yionoulis directed readings of Giant Shadows for New York Stage and Film and New Arts Theater. A revised version of the play was presented in 2011 as part of The Born Guilty Cycle: A Trilogy for The Theatre Lab in Washington, DC, and read at The National Theater.

These three plays now make up The Born Guilty Cycle: A Trilogy. In 2011 the Theatre Lab presented The Cycle in a student/professional workshop at Washington's National Theatre. Delia Taylor and Shirley Serotsky directed.

=== Other plays ===
Life in Refusal was first written as a one-act entitled Proverbial Human Suffering, this won the 1988 Helen Eisner Award for Young Playwrights from the Streisand Center for Jewish Culture. The full-length version of Life in Refusal was commissioned by the Foundation for Jewish Culture and premiered in 1988 at Performance Network Theatre in Ann Arbor, Michigan. It had its mainstage debut at Theater J in 2000; Wendy C. Goldberg directed. Life in Refusal was nominated for the Charles MacArthur Award for Outstanding New Play in 2001, and published by Samuel French, Inc. in 2003. It was anthologized in Ellen Schiff and Michael Posnick's 9 Contemporary Jewish Plays (University of Texas Press, 2005).

Oh, The Innocents was first produced as a one-act entitled Private Lessons at the Circle Repertory Company Lab; Michael Greif directed. Its second act was originally presented as the one-act The New Veil in 1988 at The Ensemble Studio Theatre's OctoberFest. The first full-length version of Oh, The Innocents was produced by GeVa Theatre as part of its 1990 "Reflections: A New Plays Festival." It won the Clifford Davie Award for New Plays. Joe Mantello directed a cast that included Josh Brolin, Peter Birkenhead, and Cordelia Richards.

Roth made his Washington directorial debut with Theater J's 2004 production of Oh, The Innocents, which included ten new original songs penned by the playwright. Oh, The Innocents is featured in The Best Men's Stage Monologues of 1990 (Smith and Kraus, Inc., 1991), and was published in 1996 by Samuel French, Inc.

Commissioned by Manhattan Theatre Club (MTC) with a grant from the National Federation of Jewish Culture in 1994, Goodnight Irene was extensively workshopped at MTC; Victory Gardens Theater; Atlantic Theater Company; HB Playwrights Foundation; the University of Chicago; and University of Michigan. Gilbert McCauley directed its 1996 world premiere at Performance Network Theatre in which Peter Birkenhead and Tim Rhoze starred. Goodnight Irene was produced at Theater J in 1998 and staged by the Hypothetical Theatre Company at the 14th Street Y in 2001.

Expanded from one-acts originally produced by HB Playwrights Foundation, Love and Yearning in the Not-for-Profits and Other Marital Distractions was workshopped at Ojai Playwrights Conference (directed by Susan Booth); New Dramatists; and Woolly Mammoth Theatre Company before its 2001 premiere at Theater J. Sarah Fox's performance in Theater J's production was nominated in 2002 for the Helen Hayes Award for Outstanding Supporting Actress, Resident Play. Love and Yearning comprises four one-act plays: Prelude to a Crisis (featured in Ensemble Studio Theatre's "Marathon '98" festival of new one-act plays, it received critical praise from The New York Times and New York Daily News, was named in "The Best Plays of 1997-1998" (Limelight Editions, 1998) and published by Dramatists Play Service in 1999); The Professor and the Whore; Terminal Connection (one of HB Playwrights Foundation's 1999 "Airport Plays", featuring Paula Gruskiewicz and Peter Birkenhead; produced by Play2C Theater Company in Berlin in 2011); and Love and Yearning in the Not-for-Profits (published by Smith and Kraus as part of "The Museum Plays" anthology).

An adaptation of Anton Chekhov's The Seagull (from a translation by Carol Rocamora), The Seagull on 16th Street was produced by Theater J in 2009. John Vreeke directed a cast featuring Naomi Jacobson, Alexander Strain and Jerry Whiddon.

A reexamination of Clifford Odets's Waiting for Lefty written by Roth with Adam Mckay, Adam Phillips, and Shira Piven. Still Waiting was produced alongside Waiting for Lefty during Theater J's 1997–98 season, Roth's first as artistic director. One-acts for various festivals include Staff Meeting (Theatre Lab Dramathon, 2011) and The Great White Undulating Orb In The Bed Between Us (Source Theatre Festival, 2008). Roth has been a member of the Dramatists Guild of America since 1987 and was a founding member of the HB Playwrights Foundation Writers Unit from 1993 to 2007.

Roth's play My Brief But Calamitous Affair With the Minister of Culture & Censorship or Death of the Dialogic in the American Theater fictionalizes events leading up to the departure of an artistic director from the unnamed theater that he founded. It was read at Philadelphia's InterAct Theater (on the set of Seth Rozin's Settlements, which dramatizes the story of a Jewish community center CEO who fires its theater's artistic director). The play received its world premiere at Woolly Mammoth Theatre's Rehearsal Hall, as part of Voices Festival Productions inaugural Middle East Festival in the fall of 2022.

== Controversies ==
In 2000, Roth launched a festival entitled "Voices from a Changing Israel" in conjunction with the four week run of David Hare's Via Dolorosa based on the playwright's experiences interviewing Arabs and Jews on a visit to Israel, the West Bank and Gaza in 1998. Four staged readings were presented alongside Hare's play, including Motti Lerner's play, The Murder of Isaac, which "grappled with the 1995 assassination of Prime Minister Yitzhak Rabin." Other Festival readings that fall included Israela Margalit's Night Blooming Jasmine, Joshua Ford's Miklat, and Ford's adaptation of Amos Oz's In The Land of Israel. In 2007, Roth expanded the embrace of the series, renaming it "Voices from a Changing Middle East."

He also founded the Peace Café in 2000 with Mimi Conway, a Theater J council member, and friend Andy Shallal, to complement performances of "Via Dolorosa." This was to "get people talking about Middle East issues and to find common ground between Jews and Arabs." Shallal joined Theater J's council and was its first and only Arab member. In his 2012 article, "Heated Dialogue," in American Theatre Magazine, Lonnie Firestone wrote that Roth had sometimes generated controversy by his choices even though he led Theater J to become "one of the most prolific producers of Israeli-oriented drama in North America."

In 2011, Theater J produced the United States premiere of Return to Haifa, adapted by Israeli playwright Boaz Gaon from a novella by Palestinian author Ghassan Kanafani. It was considered too sensitive a topic by some American theaters, dealing with the expulsion of Palestinians at the time of the 1948 Arab–Israeli War. For this production, Roth commissioned an Arabic translation for the conversations between the Palestinian couple. The show was presented in Arabic and Hebrew with English surtitles... The talkback sessions were held with different panels of scholars, artists, and activists, a total of 44. COPMA (Citizens Opposed to Propaganda Masquerading as Art), a local group formed to protest the play criticized it as anti-Israel and appealed to a major donor to cut off funding. It also objected to the Peace Cafe. The JCC decided to move the Peace Cafe off-site, and it is hosted by Andy Shallal's Busboys and Poets.

In 2012, members of COPMA attended readings intending to debate. Roth believes that theater addressing issues in the Middle East is important to broadening discussions. He has said he is attracted to the topic of "bridge crossing" between Jews and non-Jews from his own background. "It stems from my work as a playwright and as the child of Holocaust survivors." Roth says, "The black-Jewish dialogue, because of my own upbringing on the South Side of Chicago, is extraordinarily personal to me, too. The encountering of Palestinians and the dialogue between the Jew and the Arab has grown out of those same impulses—the commonality of experience."

In 2014, Roth was terminated as Theater J's artistic director. Over 100 artistic directors of U.S. theater companies published an open letter denouncing his termination by the JCC of Washington, D.C. The open letter, signed by leaders of companies including Lincoln Center Theater and Public Theater, Chicago's Steppenwolf Theatre and Washington's Shakespeare Theatre Company, stated that "it is absolutely clear that Roth was fired because of the content of the work he has so thoughtfully and ably championed for the last two decades."

In November 2020, Roth resigned as Mosaic Theater Company of DC's artistic director. Complaints by staff members and months of internal conflict led to Roth's resignation, stating he was unable to live with the restrictions imposed on his leadership after a board of directors-mandated, summer-long sabbatical to engage in research, reflection, exploration of management skills and abilities. Roth submitted his resignation on November 17, 2020 and it was unanimously accepted by the 29-member board. Roth claimed his resignation from Mosaic Theater Company of DC was in part, due to disagreements about the content of the "Voices From a Changing Middle East Festival" which he had created during his tenure at Theater J and transferred to Mosaic Theater Company of DC. Roth stated "All original selections for the 2021 Voices Festival, intentionally intercultural and programmed in order to work either in live or virtual performance — were thrown out in favor of an exclusively Palestinian-centered festival." This information was directly contradicted by Mosaic Theater Company of DC in a public statement on November 20, 2020 noting, "A review of 20 years of programming (about 75 projects in all) revealed that only one project, a staged reading, was written by a Palestinian (In Spitting Distance by Taher Najib) and two works were adaptations of Palestinian authored texts. In an effort to provide some balance, the Artistic Team began discussions around using our 2020 virtual platform to highlight a play by a Palestinian writer appropriate for online presentation. Jewish pro-peace voices were never excluded. Any representation to the contrary is simply not true . A series of constructive, challenging and critical conversations were underway about how best to honor the spirit of the festival for this year when Mr. Roth removed himself from the table."

== Directing ==
- Oh, The Innocents – Theater J, 2004
- Randolph of Roanoke by Roy Friedman – Tribute Productions staged reading at Warehouse Theater, 2003. Winner of the Sprenger Lang Foundation/Tribute Productions Nathan Miller History Play Contest.
- South Side: Racial Transformation of an American Neighbor-Hood by Louis Rosen, based on his book of the same name. Staged concert readings at Theater J, 1998 and 2007.

== Honors ==
- 2017, Mayor's Arts Award for Visionary Leadership
- 2009, he was identified as one of the "Forward 50" (Jewish-Americans 'who have made a significant impact on the Jewish story in the past year") by The Forward.
