= Lyn Coffin =

American poet, writer, translator, and editor

- Born: November 12, 1943 (age 82); Flushing, New York
- Education: University of Michigan
- Occupations: Poet, writer, editor, translator

Lyn Coffin (born November 12, 1943) is an American poet, writer, translator, and editor.

== Biography ==
She has been an Associate Editor of the Michigan Quarterly Review and previously taught English at the University of Washington, Renton High School, (Note: through "Writers of the School") the University of Michigan Residential College, Detroit University, MIAD (Milwaukee Institute of Arts and Design), University of Wisconsin at Milwaukee, Ilia State University at Tbilisi, Republic of Georgia, Jih Elementary School at Marianské Lázně, Czechoslovakia, and Mando Technical Institute, as well as Council House and the Summit at Capitol Hill.

Coffin is the author of more than thirty books of poetry, fiction, drama, nonfiction, and translation. She has published fiction, poetry and non-fiction in over fifty quarterlies and small magazines, including Catholic Digest and Time magazine. One of her fictions, originally published in the Michigan Quarterly Review appeared in Best American Short Stories 1979, edited by Joyce Carol Oates. Her plays have been performed at theaters in Malaysia, Singapore, Boston, New York (Off Off Broadway), Detroit, Ann Arbor, and Seattle. She has also given poetry readings alongside Nobel Prize winning poets Joseph Brodsky, Czesław Miłosz, and Philip Levine.

She is a consulting editor of Bracken, and a member of EasySpeak, PoetsWest, and Greenwood Poets. Poezia Press published Coffin's translation of The Knight in the Panther Skin, a 12th-century epic poem by Shota Rustaveli and classic of Georgian literature. It has been largely unknown to English-speaking audiences because few translations have been produced.

== Awards ==
While a student in Ann Arbor, Michigan, she won Major and Minor Hopwood Awards in every category.

Coffin was awarded SABA, the Georgian National Literature Prize in 2016.

== Bibliography ==
=== Books ===
- Human Trappings, Abattoir Editions (1980)
- Elegies by Jiří Orten, CVU Press, (1981). Translation from Czech.
- The Plague Column by Jaroslav Seifert, CVU Press (1981). Translation from Czech. (Note: Used by the Nobel Committee in granting Seifert his prize.)
- The Poetry of Wickedness, Ithaca House (1982)
- Poems of Akhmatova, W.W. Norton (1983). Translation from Russian. Reviewed in The New York Review of Books.
- Crystals of the Unforeseen, Plain View Press (1999)
- More than One Life, by Miloslava Holubova, Northwestern University Press (2000). Translation from Czech, with Zdenka Brodska, and Alex Zucker.
- Islands in the Stream of Time, by Germain Droogenbroodt, (2008). Translation from Dutch, with the collaboration of the author.
- White Picture, by Jiri Orten (2011). Translation from the Czech, with Eva Eckert, Zdenka Brodska, Leda Pugh. Night Publishing, UK, (2011).
- "East and West", poems (and Mongolian translations), with Bavuudorj Tsog. Ulaanbataar, (2012).
- "მე ორივე ვარ" ("I Am Both"). Poetry, fiction, non-fiction, translated into Georgian by Gia Jokhadze, Mertskuli (Tbilisi), 2012.
- "Joseph Brodsky was Joseph Brodsky," Levan Kavleli Publishing, 2012 (This book was reviewed by Judith Roche, in Big Bridge, 2013)
- "Georgian Anthology of Poetry". Translation from Georgian, ed, by Dodona Kiziria, with the help of Gia Jokhadze. Slavica (Indiana University), September, 2013.
- "Animalarky," by Zaza Abiadnidze. Translation from Georgian, September, 2013.
- "Miniatures," poetry by Giorgi Kekelidze. Translation from Georgian, October, 2013.
- "Still Life with Snow", by Dato Barbakadze. Translation from Georgian, with Nato Alhazishvili, 2014 (This book received a $2000 translation award from the Georgian Ministry of Culture and Monuments.)
- "A Taste of Cascadia," two plays. Whale Road Books, March, 2015.
- "The First Honeymoon," short fiction. Iron Twine Press, April, 2015.
- "A Marriage Without Consummation," poetry, with Givi Alkhazishvili. English and Georgian. Whale Road Books. April 2016.
- "10 by 10" (plays by Lyn and Natalya Churlyaeva in Russian and English, face en face). Bedouin Books, August, 2015.
- "The Knight in the Panther Skin," by Shota Rustaveli, poetry. Translation from Georgian. Poezia Press. September, 2015.
- "Standing on Earth, the poetry of Mohsen Emadi," forthcoming from Phoneme Media . Translated from the Persian with the author, September, 2016, or Perseus Book Groups .
- "A Boy Named Piccolo," translation from the Georgian ("Salamura," by Archil Sulakauri), with Nika Muskheli, illustrated by Vaho Muskheli. Forthcoming June, 2016, Transcendent Zero Press.
- "Henry and Punkin," children's story, illustrated by Reza Bigonah, printed by Iron Twine Press. . December 24, 2016
- "The First Honeymoon," Iron Twine Press, 2017. Excerpts.
- Whale Road Books published Rifles & Reception Lines, Lyn Coffin and Mercedes Luna Fuentes's collection of Spanish and English poetry.
- This Green Life: New and Selected Poems. Transcendent Zero Press February 6, 2017
- The Knight in the Panther Skin Selected Aphorisms, Poezia Press, 2017.
- This Green Life: New and Selected Poems, Translated into Spanish, 2018. Pregunta Editions
- Three Centuries of Georgian Poetry, Adelaide Books, 2018, Translation from Georgian.
- The Aftermath, a novel, Adelaide Books, 2020.
- The Artwork on the Backs of Gargoyles, a book of sestinas and villanelles and paradelles, Transcendent Zero Press, 2021.

=== Plays ===
- "French Fries in a Wineglass" (performed, Eclectic Theater Seattle). July 2017.
- "The Girl in the Moon" (performed, Eclectic Theater, Seattle. July, 2015.)
- "Another Passage" (a script-in-hand reading at Arts West as part of Seattle Playwrights' Studio's Showcase, 2012 by Barbara Lindsay
- "Vera's Red Hat" (performed at Stone Soup Theater, Seattle, summer, 2011)
- "Lutefisk" (performed in New York, spring, 2010 and Nordic Museum, summer, 2010)
- "Rodin's Girl Friend" (performed at TaDa! Theater in New York, part of "One Woman Standing," spring, 2010.)
- "His Russian Wife" (performed at Boston University's Playwright Theater, as part of their Russian Festival, February, 2010.)
- "Seabird," "The Box," "The Museum," "The Tomcat" (performed at Where Eagles Dare Theater in New York, summer, 2009)
- "Lutefisk" (performed at Odd Duck Studios in Seattle, Washington, as part of Seattle Playwrights' Collective's Showcase, 2009.)
- "The Table" (performed in Singapore, as part of Short + Sweet, summer, 2009.
- "The Only Pretty Thing in the Room" (performed at ArtsWest in Seattle, Washington, as part of Seattle Playwrights' Studio's Showcase, 2009.
- "The Difference Between Altoona and Alpena" (performed at ArtsWest in Seattle, Washington, as part of Seattle Playwrights' Studio's Showcase, 2008.
- "Thin Walls" (performed at the Craft Theatre in Ann Arbor, Michigan, and the Attic Theatre in Detroit, Michigan, 1987)
- "Nocturnal Emissions" (performed at the Performance Network Theatre in Ann Arbor, Michigan)
- "The Characters are Anyone, The Place Anywhere" (performed at The Performance Network Theatre in Ann Arbor, Michigan, 1986)
- "Two Square Meals" (performed at the Performance Network Theatre in Ann Arbor, Michigan, 1985, and at the Trueblood Theatre at the University of Michigan.
- "This Side Up" (performed at the Performance Network Theatre in Ann Arbor, Michigan, and at the Craft Theatre, Ann Arbor, Michigan, as a special performance to benefit St. Joseph's Hospital Cancer Fund, 1985)
- "Halfway Measures" (performed script-in-hand at the Performance Network Theatre in Ann Arbor, Michigan, 1985)
- "A Stone's Throw" (read at the Attic Theatre in Detroit, Michigan, 1982)
- "The Atomic Weight of Potassium" (read at the Performance Network Theatre in Ann Arbor, Michigan, 1983)
- "The Atomic Weight of Potassium" (performed at the Performance Network Theatre in Ann Arbor, Michigan, 1983)
- "Acting Out" (performed script-in-hand at the Performance Network Theatre in Ann Arbor, Michigan, 1983)
- "Straws in the Wind" (read and performed at the Performance Network Theatre in Ann Arbor, Michigan, 1983)
- "Genie in a Klein Bottle" (performed script-in-hand at the Performance Network Theatre in Ann Arbor, Michigan, 1984)
- "The Maze in the Aquarium"
- "Fries in a Wineglass"
- "Tonsils and Adenoids"

Coffin also translated and adapted Milan Uhde's play Ave Maria, Played Softly for the stage. This was performed at Performance Network Theatre in Ann Arbor, c. 1985.
