= Max Mark-Cranbrook Global Peacemaker Awards =

The Max Mark-Cranbrook Global Peacemaker Awards is an annual international awards program presented by Rotary International, that recognizes individuals for exceptional contributions to domestic and international peace. It is presented with The Center for Peace and Conflict Studies (CPCS), Wayne State University in Detroit, Michigan, in the United States.

== History ==
The Max Mark-Cranbrook Global Peacemaker Awards were founded with the aim of promoting peace, reconciliation, and conflict resolution. The awards seek to acknowledge the efforts of individuals and organizations that have made significant strides in fostering peace and harmony across borders, as well as tackling some of the gravest social justice issues such as gendered violence, human trafficking and modern slavery, gun violence and mass incarceration, human rights, addiction and depression, indigenous rights, and other issues. The annual Cranbrook Global Peacemaker Lecture was incorporated into Wayne State's Center for Peace and Conflict Studies in its annual Community Peacemaker Awards program in 2009.

In 2019 the awards ceremony was held at the Arab American National Museum in Dearborn, Michigan, with the Center for Peace & Conflict Studies. In 2022, they were held at the Center for Peace and Conflict Studies, Wayne State.

== Notable awardees ==
Name	Description
Bishop Desmond Tuto	Anti-apartheid and human rights activist, Nobel Prize Winner
Dr. Noam Chomsky	Author, Linguist, Activist, Intellectual Historian
Abigail Disney	Emmy Award Winning Documentary Filmmaker
Dr. Izzeldin Abuelaish	Israeli-Palestinian Human Rights Activist known as "The Martin Luther King of the Middle East"
Mary Robinson	Former President of Ireland UN High Commissioner for Refugee and Human Rights
Indrani Pal-Chaudhuri	Filmmaker, photographer, human rights and social justice activist
Samantha Fuentes	Parkland Survivor and Student Activist
Dr. Sakena Yacoobi	Founder of the Afghan Institute of Learning (AIL), Vice President of Hope International (CHI)
Howard Zinn	American Historian and Activist
Dr. Craig Spencer	Ebola survivor and Director of Global Health in Emergency Medicine
