= Martin Blank (playwright) =

American dramatist

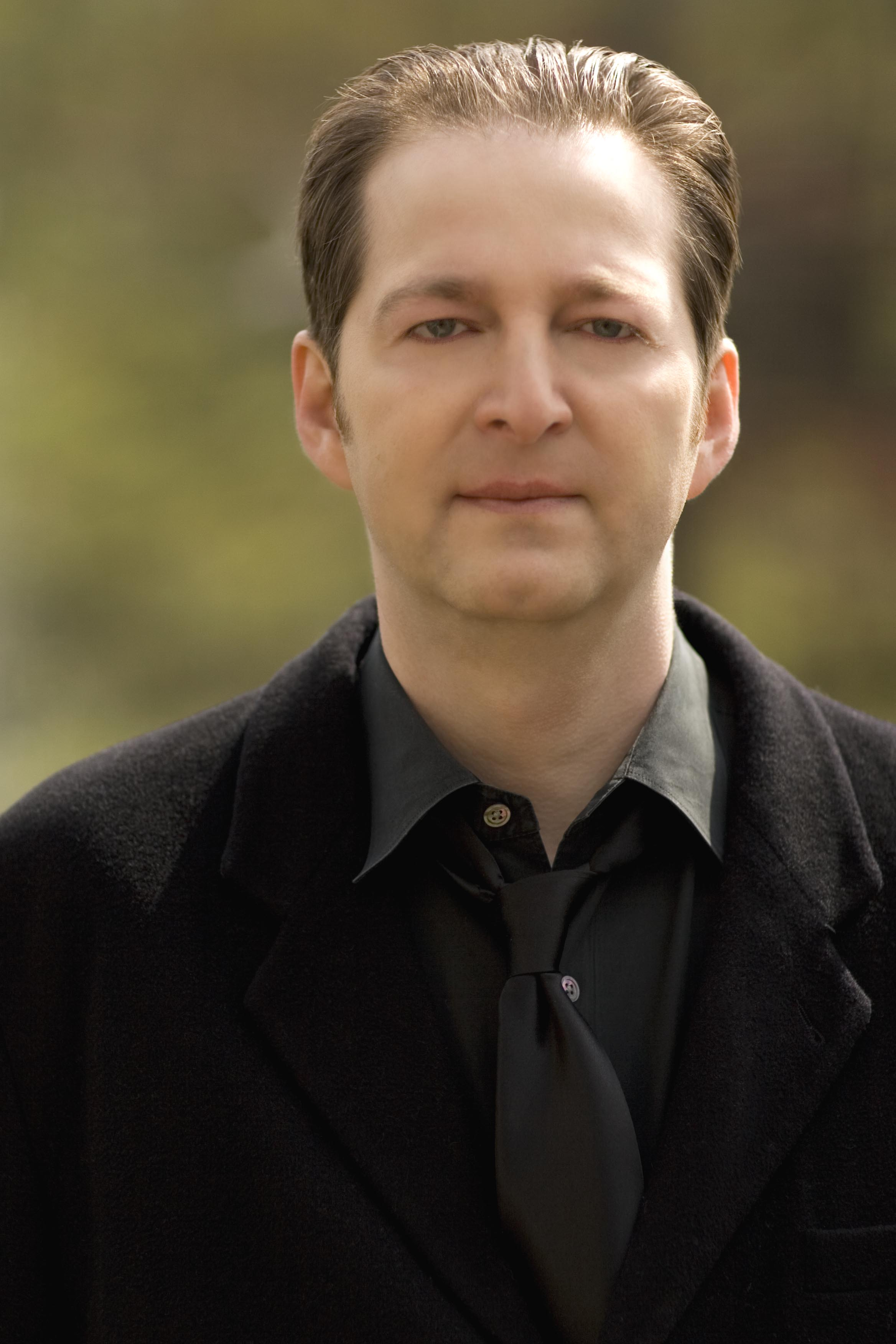
- Born: Bethesda, Maryland
- Occupation: playwright, screenwriter
- Spouse: Penelope Blank (m. 2003)

Martin Blank is an American playwright, screenwriter, theatrical producer, and acting coach.

== Biography ==
Martin Blank was born in Bethesda, Maryland, where he attended Bethesda Chevy Chase High School. He attended the University of Maryland and the Yale School of Drama.

== Career ==
Two of Blank's plays were produced Off Broadway: The Law of Return at the Fourth Street Theatre, and Avenue of Americas at The Tank Theater.

The Law of Return is a political thriller inspired by the real-life case involving Jonathan Pollard, a former U.S. intelligence analyst who pleaded guilty to charges of spying for Israel. In 2024, he was developing a screenplay of The Law of Return for producers Rory Koslow and Gail Berman of The Jackal Group.

Blank's comedy Driving Green was produced at the Journeyman Theater in Washington, D.C. Blank's comedy Read My Lips was produced by New Gate Theater in Providence, R.I. '

In 2018, a one-man musical adapted from talks by Booker T. Washington titled Character Building was produced at Capital Hill Arts Workshop.

Blank was Founding Artistic Director of Theater J.
