= Jiří Orten =

Czech poet (1919–1941)

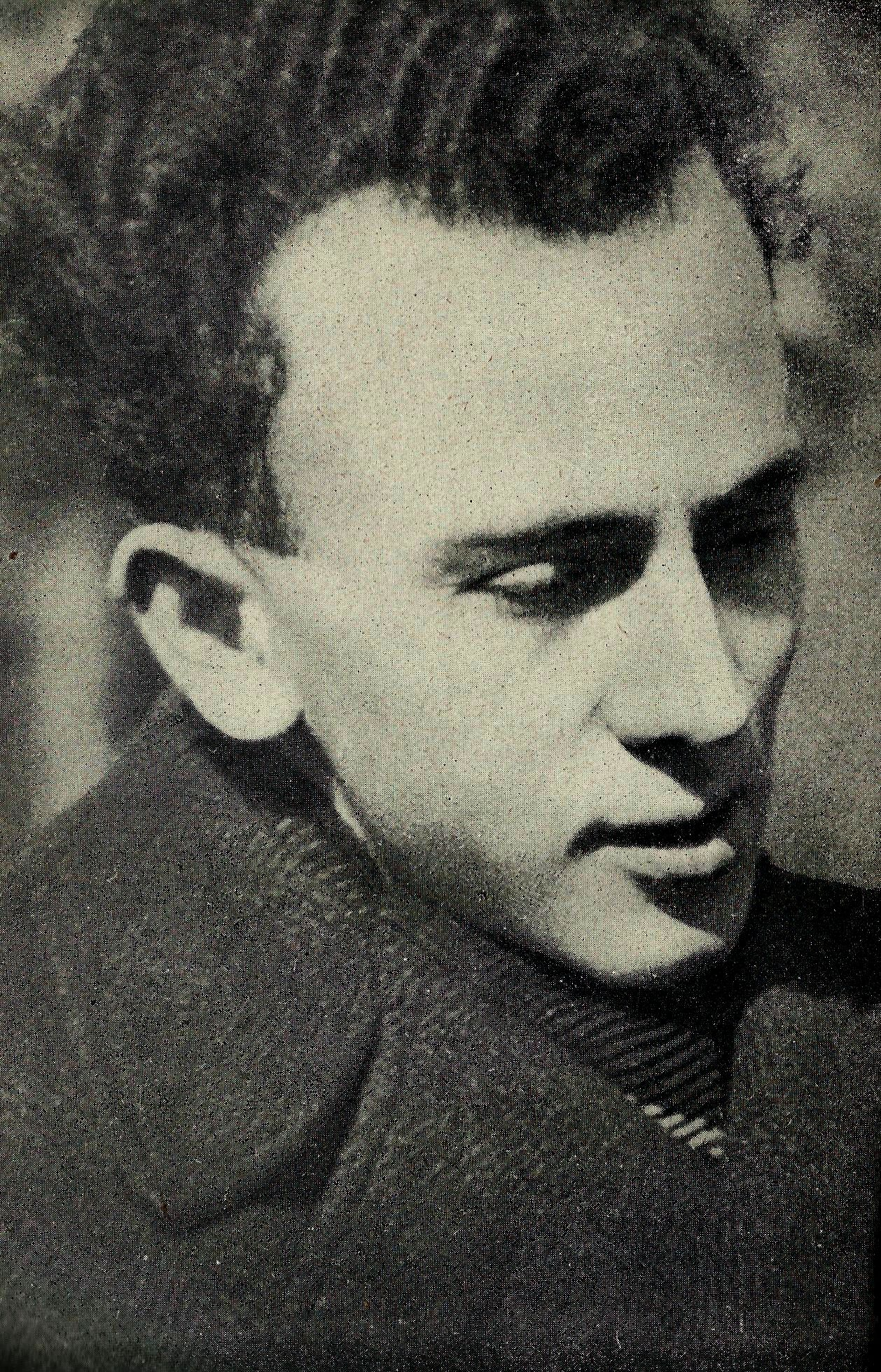
- Born: Jiří Ohrenstein; 30 August 1919; Kutná Hora, Czechoslovakia
- Died: 1 September 1941 (aged 22); Prague, Protectorate of Bohemia and Moravia
- Occupation: Poet
- Years active: 1930–1942
- Notable work: Ohnice; Elegie

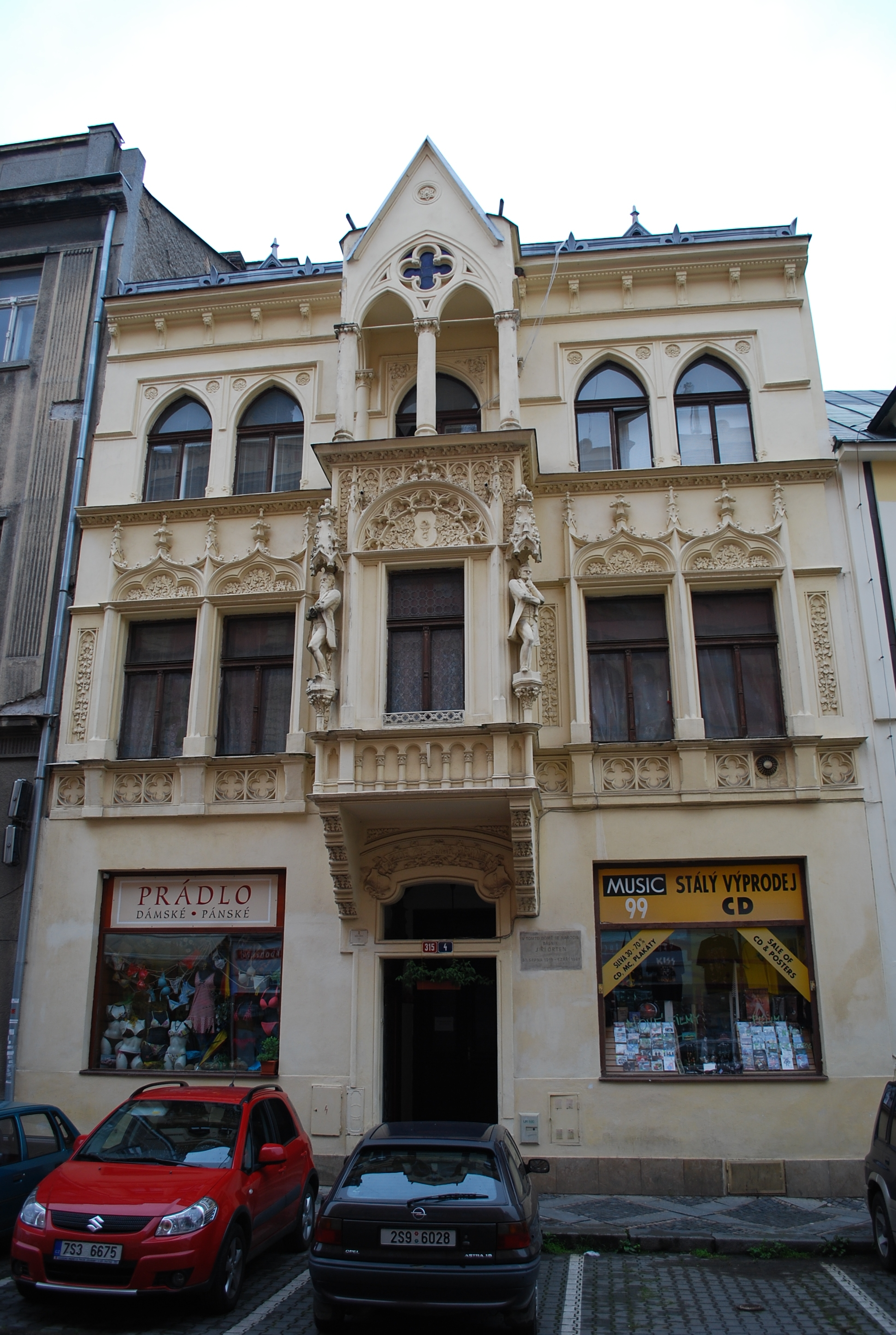
Orten's birth house in Kutná Hora

Jiří Orten (born Jiří Ohrenstein; 30 August 1919 in Kutná Hora – 1 September 1941 in Prague) was a Czech poet. His work was influenced by surrealism and folklore.

== Life ==
Orten was born in Kutná Hora as Jiří Ohrenstein. His first book of poems, Čítanka jaro (Reader of Spring), came out in 1939. He spent time in Paris, but ultimately returned to Prague. As a Jew his life under Nazi rule was extremely restricted, but for a time he continued to write under pseudonyms. At some point in 1940 his situation worsened and he was no longer able to write under pseudonyms. This situation forced him to take odd jobs and a romantic relationship failed around this time. Eight days before his death, his pseudonymous writing was denounced in the antisemitic periodical Arijský boj. Although he had shown interest in communism in youth, religious themes concerning the Book of Job and God became more evident in his writing.

On 30 August 1941 he was hit by an ambulance. He was taken to the General Infirmary, which refused him treatment because he was Jewish, so he was moved to another hospital. He died two days later. Although he gained a cult following for a few years after his death, the Communists later rejected him as "degenerative muck." His work gained renewed interest during the Prague Spring, and ultimately opinion of him rebounded. This re-appraisal led Czechoslovakia to create a literary prize named for him in 1987.

In 2011, White Picture, a collection of Orten's poetry in an English translation by the American poet Lyn Coffin, was published. Lyn's translations of Orten were described by Orten's brother, Ota Ornest, as "the poems Jiří would have written if he'd written in English." The book features an introduction by Ed Hirsch.

Jiří Orten Award, a literary prize for young authors in the Czech Republic, is named in his honor.

== Work ==
- Čítanka jaro (1939)
- Cesta k mrazu (1940)
- Jeremiášův pláč (1941)
- Ohnice (1941)
- Elegie (1946)
- Deníky Jiřího Ortena (1958)
- Eta, Eta, žlutí ptáci (1966)

=== English translation ===
- White Picture (2011; translated by Lyn Coffin)

== Bibliography ==
- Jiří Orten, Elegie, Vyšehrad, Prague 2013.
