= I Shall Not Hate (film) =

2024 Canadian documentary film

- Directed by: Tal Barda
- Based on: I Shall Not Hate by Izzeldin Abuelaish
- Produced by: Paul Cadieux
- Starring: Izzeldin Abuelaish
- Edited by: Geoff Klein
- Production company: Mandala Films
- Distributed by: Filmoption International; Destiny Distribution
- Release date: March 18, 2024 (CPH:DOX)
- Running time: 95 minutes
- Countries: Canada; France
- Languages: English; Arabic; Hebrew

I Shall Not Hate is a Canadian-French documentary film, directed by Tal Barda and released in 2024. Adapted from Izzeldin Abuelaish's 2011 book I Shall Not Hate, the film recounts Abuelaish's life journey through to his contemporary profile as an activist for peace in the Israeli–Palestinian conflict.

== Release ==
The film premiered in March 2024 at the CPH:DOX festival, and had its Canadian premiere in September at the Quebec City Film Festival.

== Critical response ==
Aleksandra Biernacka of Modern Times Review wrote that "I Shall Not Hate uses a wide array of stylistic tools – archival footage of the Jabalia Refugee Camp at different points in time, warm-coloured painted animation, Israeli and world media news coverage, interviews, and home video movies – in order to construct a flowing and engaging narrative focused on a charismatic character and his fight for dignity and a right to live. At the same time, his personal story is seamlessly interwoven into a wider canvas of political events, which form the history of Gaza and its people. Next, US Presidents give statements and comments on the unfolding tragedy, which none apparently has the power to stop. And again and again, the words fail in the face of ongoing trauma.

== Awards ==
Award	Date of ceremony	Category	Recipient(s)	Result	Ref.
Canadian Screen Awards	June 1, 2025	Best Editing in a Documentary	Geoff Klein	Nominated	
Cinema for Peace awards	2025	Special Dove	Goes to the Protagonist of the film, Professor Dr Izzeldin Abuelaish and received by Director Tal Barda	Won	
The Hague Movies That Matter Festival	2024	Audience Award received by the Protagonist of the Film Professor Dr Izzeldin Abuelaish	Goes to the Protagonist of the film, Professor Dr Izzeldin Abuelaish and received by Director Tal Barda	Won	
