= Double Exposure (American TV series) =

- Genre: Docu-Series
- Starring: GK Reid; Indrani Pal-Chaudhuri; Markus Klinko
- Country of origin: United States
- No. of seasons: 1
- No. of episodes: 6

Production
- Executive producers: Bob Horowitz; Lewis Fenton
- Production company: Juma Entertainment

Original release
- Network: Bravo
- Release: June 15 – July 20, 2010

Double Exposure is an American documentary series which premiered on June 15, 2010, on the Bravo cable network, and was syndicated to over 200 countries. The series featured the creative process and working lives of two of the world's top photographers Indrani Pal-Chaudhuri and Markus Klinko, along with producer / designer GK Reid.

== Premise ==
The documentary television series follows Swiss Markus Klinko and Indian-born Indrani Pal-Chaudhuri, described by American Photo as "two of photography's biggest talents." They are known for their images of popular culture icons, from album art for Beyoncé, Lady Gaga and David Bowie, to magazine covers of actors from Keanu Reeves to Will Smith, and advertising campaigns such as Kate Winslet for Lancôme, Mary J. Blige for Pepsi and Britney Spears for Elizabeth Arden perfumes. They are joined by creative producer / fashion designer GK Reid, who is known for his avant-garde styling, creative direction, and production expertise, creating among others Rihanna's breakthrough look for her "Umbrella" single cover and reinventing Mariah Carey's image for her Emancipation of Mimi album cover. Jorge Perez, their agent, is also featured as he brokers their deals.

Markus and Indrani provide the TV audience unprecedented behind-the-scenes access to A-list celebrities, and a rare glimpse of the process of creating celebrity and fashion images and mobilizing markets and movements. Because Markus and Indrani are a duo and former couple, their artistic process is externalized, allowing their collaborators and their viewers to take part in their creative discussions. Unlike other reality shows where celebrities make cameo appearances, "Double Exposure" is based on extensive footage of the celebrities and designers working together with the photographers as co-creators of their real images, which then becomes an important part of pop culture.

Drama and comedy arise as the pressures mount and the artists are very passionate, interacting in surprising ways. In Touch reports, "The stars are on both sides of the camera... Beyonce got into Markus pants before he fell in love with Britney and went Gaga...". Markus and Indrani are a former couple, who come from opposite perspectives and often disagree, and GK often has to serve as referee. Before they began photography together, French-Hungarian Klinko was a classical harp soloist who won the "Grand Prix du Disque" for his EMI recording with the Paris Opera Bastille Orchestra. Kolkata-born Indrani Pal-Chaudhuri was an internationally successful fashion model and Princeton University graduate in anthropology, who founded a charitable school and female empowerment foundation which has expanded from her home in India, Shakti Regeneration Institute (www.shaktiregeneration.org). The duo were first discovered by Isabella Blow, then by David Bowie and Iman. They work 18-hour days in high-stress environments, with difficult deadlines, stretched budgets, expensive locations and demanding talent who are their clients and require real results that will become an important part of pop culture.

== Episodes ==
No.	Title	Original release date
1	"A Monster With Two Heads"	June 15, 2010
2	"Is Lindsay There Yet?"	June 22, 2010
3	"I'm Gonna Smash the Ringflash!"	June 29, 2010
4	"No One's Keeping You Here"	July 6, 2010
5	"No One Can Work Like This"	July 13, 2010
6	"Mexico Is a Dream Compared to This"	July 20, 2010

== Critical response ==
According to Life & Style "The former lovers impress with their client roster and entertain with their fiery personalities." “The two stars are charming, funny, and talented. Throw in some behind-the-scenes photo material and a few superstar portrait subjects, and you’re looking at something special."

LA Times' Jon Caramanica suggests that the show is groundbreaking: "Perhaps that's the tipping point for a cultural course correction back toward the value of artifice.

Cosmopolitan reports that ""Double Exposure"...feels like "America's Next Top Model" and "Project Runway" mixed together and on speed." They also state that, "The two super famous celebrity photographers, Markus Klinko and Indrani...have enough personality to make the Real Housewives look dull."

CNN's Showbiz Tonight interviewed the duo live on July 13, 2010, about their shoot with Lady Gaga and Naomi Campbell. On July 20, 2010 Larry King interviewed Indrani and Markus Klinko on Larry King Live and featured their "Double Exposure" show including Indrani's foundation Shakti Empowerment Education.
