= Theater J =

Professional theater company in Washington, DC, United States

Coordinates: 38°54′39.1″N 77°2′8.9″W

- Type: Theatre group
- Location(s): 1529 16th Street NW, Washington, D.C., 20036, United States
- Notable members: Martin Blank, Founding Artistic Director (1990–1993), Ari Roth, Artistic Director (1997–2014), Rebecca Ende Lichtenberg, Managing Director (2013–2018), Adam Immerwahr, Artistic Director (2016–2022), Jojo Ruf, Managing Director (2018–2021), David Lloyd Olson, Managing Director (2021–present), Hayley Finn, Artistic Director (2023–present)
- Website: theaterj.org

Theater J is a professional theater company located in Washington, DC, founded to present works that "celebrate the distinctive urban voice and social vision that are part of the Jewish cultural legacy".

== Organization ==
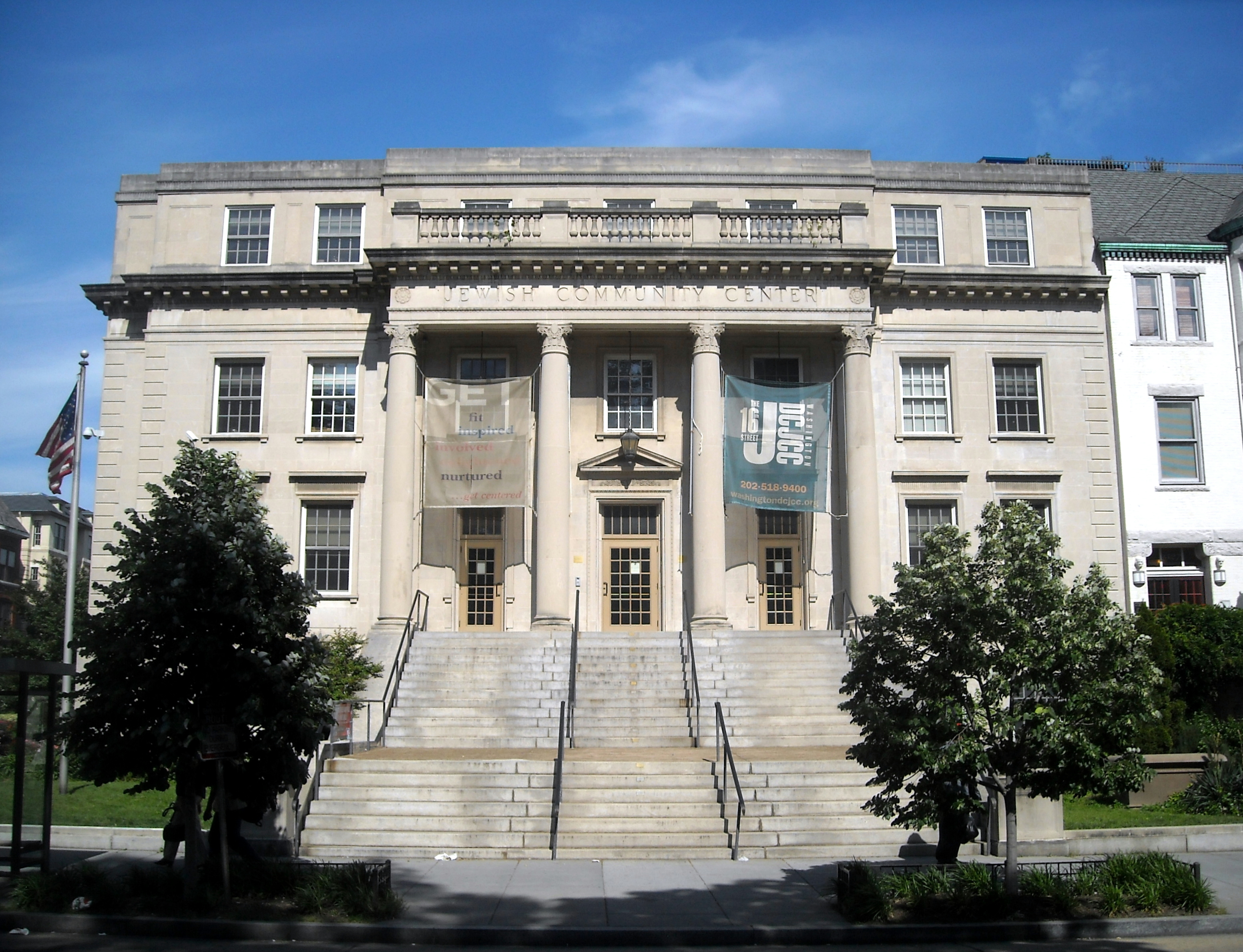
Theater J is housed in the Washington, D.C. Jewish Community Center (DCJCC).

Hailed by The New York Times as "The Premier Theater for Premieres," and recipient of 61 Helen Hayes nominations and awards, Theater J has emerged as a Jewish theater on the national scene. A program of the Washington DC Jewish Community Center, Theater J performs in the Aaron & Cecile Goldman Theater, part of the Washington, D.C. Jewish Community Center's Morris Cafritz Center for the Arts in D.C.'s Dupont Circle neighborhood. Founding Artistic Director was Martin Blank (1990–1993). In December 2014, Ari Roth, Theater J's artistic director of 18 years, was fired after a series of widely publicized disagreements. Between January 2014 and November 2015, Shirley Serotsky (previously Associate Artistic Director) served as Theater J's Acting Artistic Director. Adam Immerwahr served as Artistic Director from 2015 to 2022. In 2015, the theater operated on a $1.6 million budget.

Theater J performs in the 240-seat Aaron & Cecile Goldman Theater in the Dupont Circle neighborhood. It has produced world premieres by Thomas Keneally, Robert Brustein, Wendy Wasserstein, Joyce Carol Oates, and Ariel Dorfman, with many debuts from emerging writers like Anna Ziegler, Sam Forman, and Renee Calarco. Theater J also supports the development of new plays by local playwrights. It has been called out by The Washington Post as "simply one of the most important and worthwhile projects that any local theater has adopted." With successful productions including Talley's Folly, The Disputation, Honey Brown Eyes, The Chosen (a Theater J production presented by Arena Stage at the Mead Center for American Theater), New Jerusalem, After the Fall, Our Class, Race and Freud's Last Session, The Washington Post proclaimed that "Theater J propels itself to a new level of engagement with its audience, and, perhaps, to the forefront of theaters exposing Americans to drama that stirs the conscience as it illuminates aspects of Jewish culture."

Winner of the 2008 Mayor's Arts Award for Excellence in an Artistic Discipline, Theater J also offers readings, panel discussions, cast talkbacks, youth initiatives, and outreach to adult populations with little contact to the performing arts.

== Plays ==
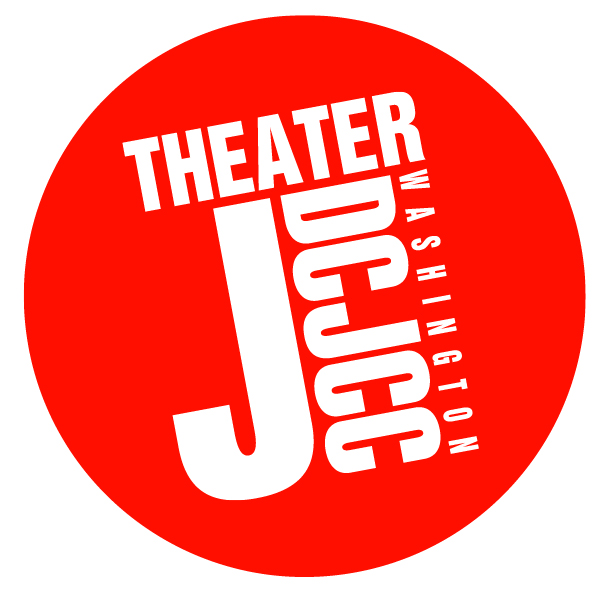

Since its establishment in 1990, Theater J has made new play development a critical pillar of its work. With over 40 world premiere productions, English language premieres, and second productions of newly revised plays, Theater J has made new work a key strategy for creating art that speaks to Jewish values and to the issues and concerns of the Washington D.C. community. In addition to producing new plays, each season Theater J conducts workshops and staged readings of plays in development in order to support playwrights in the creation of new plays.

Stefanie Zadravec's Honey Brown Eyes, recipient of the 2009 Charles MacArthur Award for Outstanding New Play, was published in American Theatre Magazine. It went on to productions at The Working Theatre Off-Broadway and in smaller venues throughout the USA. Theodore Bikel's Sholom Aleichem: Laughter Through Tears, a one-man, three-musician musical which premiered at Theater J in 2008, went on to a successful run at the National Yiddish Theatre Folksbiene at Baruch Performing Arts Center in NY where Bikel was nominated for a 2010 Drama Desk Award for Solo Performance by an Actor. Subsequently, it has been produced in Los Angeles, Toronto, and toured throughout Eastern Europe.

For several years, Theater J hosted a festival called "Locally Grown", a new play development initiative that commissions and produces plays by local playwrights. It was called "quite simply one of the most important and worthwhile projects that any local theater has adopted, in the cause of making this a more hospitable city for playwriting talent" by The Washington Post.

Theater J has a long history of working with Israeli playwrights to develop the English-language premieres of their work, working with Boaz Goan on the English-language premiere of Boged (Traitor): An Enemy of the People, Hillel Milepunkt's The Accident, Hadar Galron's Mikveh, with multiple premieres over the years from Motti Lerner (Passing The Love of Women, Pangs of The Messiah, Benedictus, and the workshop presentation of The Admission).

Theater J also has a history of important second productions that bring plays to the attention of the theatrical world beyond their world-premieres, such as the production of Anna Ziegler's Photograph 51, first produced by Active Cultures Theater in Maryland and later produced by many theaters.

Other second productions that included significant revisions include Jacquelyn Reingold's String Fever in 2005, Kate Fodor's Hannah and Martin in 2005, Jennifer Maisel's The Last Seder in 2003, The Mad Dancers by Yehuda Hyman in 2003, co-directed by Liz Lerman, The Argument by Alexandra Gersten-Vassilaros, and the 2016 production of Another Way Home by Anna Ziegler.

Theater J has shown premieres by Richard Greenberg (Bal Masque), Ariel Dorfman (Picasso's Closet), Joyce Carol Oates (The Tattooed Girl), Wendy Wasserstein (Third), Aaron Posner (Life Sucks), and Caleen Sinette Jennings (Queens Girl in the World).

== Critical response ==
Theater J has been described by The New York Times as offering "professional polish, thoughtful dramaturgy and nervy experimentation," and by Hadassah Magazine as "one of the most successful and avant-garde" of contemporary American Jewish theaters. The company is also known for its record of premiering new works. The New York Times called Theater J "The Premier Theater for Premieres."
