= Indrani Pal-Chaudhuri =

Indian born Canadian-British director, photographer, founder and futurist

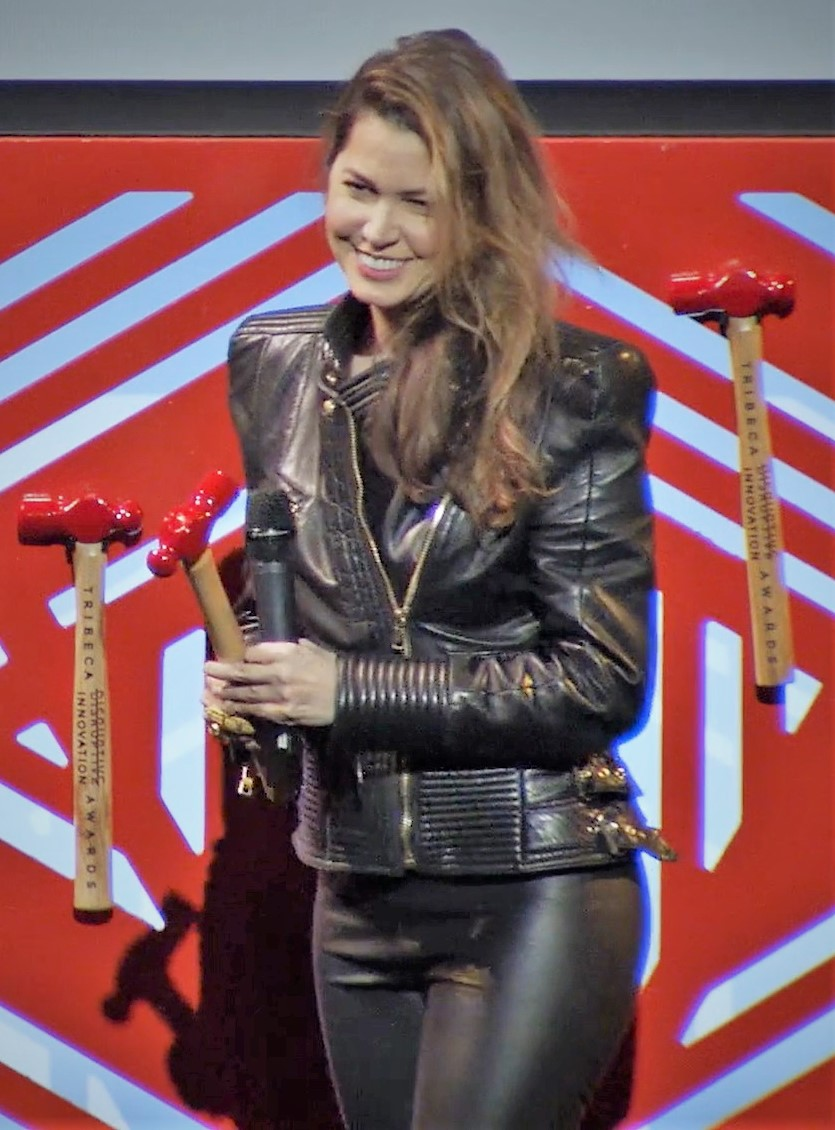
- Indrani receiving a 2019 Tribeca Disruptive Innovation Award
- Born: 1983 (age 42–43); Kolkata, West Bengal, India
- Education: Princeton University (Cultural Anthropology)
- Occupations: Film director; photographer; writer; producer; Founder; Director of foundation; former model and actress; public speaker; academic lecturer
- Awards: Max Mark-Cranbrook 2019 Global Peace Maker; United Nations 2018 Women's Entrepreneurship Distinguished Fellowship; Tribeca Film Festival 2019 Disruptive Innovation Award; Best Picture at the CNN 2018 Expose Award
- Website: indrani.com

Indrani Pal-Chaudhuri is an Indian-Canadian founder, futurist, film director, and artist.

She has collaborated with Lady Gaga, Beyonce, Jennifer Lopez, Alicia Keys, Jay-Z, and Kanye West.

Pal-Chaudhuri's work has won the Tribeca Film Festival 2019 Disruptive Innovation Award, where she was described as "A leading director and voice for women's empowerment", the CNN Expose Best Picture Award, and two gold Cannes Lions. Her editorial clients include Vogue, GQ, Vanity Fair, Harper's Bazaar, and Interview magazine. Brands such as Nike, Pepsi, L'Oréal Paris, Lancôme, LVMH, Hugo Boss, Anna Sui, Skyy Vodka, and Remy Martin have hired Pal-Chaudhuri to create advertising campaigns. Her campaign for Keep A Child Alive raised over $3.5 million and over 1.5 billion impressions, to provide anti-retroviral treatment for families with HIV in Africa and India.

Described as a "rad feminist" by Julianne E. Shepherd, editor-in-chief of Jezebel, and as "an activist filmmaker tackling some of the biggest issues facing the world," Pal-Chaudhuri is a human rights, sustainable growth, freedom, and economic empowerment advocate. Recognized by the United Nations as a Women's Entrepreneurship Distinguished Fellow, a Max Mark-Cranbrook Global Peacemaker, Co-Host of the Global People's Summit at the United Nations, Organizer and Host of the Princeton University Lewis Center "Art of Anti-Racism and Social Justice" symposium.

== Early life ==
Pal-Chaudhuri was born in Kolkata, India, in 1983, raised in the historic palace of her traditional Zamindar family, and accompanied her British mother as a volunteer with Mother Teresa and the Ramakrishna Mission. Both her parents were accountants, and her Rastafarian stepfather was a musician and counselor. She witnessed "the devastating poverty that stood in stark contrast to her own childhood" in India, which motivated her to someday make a difference in the area.

== Early career ==
Pal-Chaudhuri began modeling and acting at age 14, to study photography and filmmaking with artists around the world. She was featured in publications including Vogue, Glamour, Elle and in campaigns and commercials for Marie Claire, Benetton, MAC Cosmetics, VH1, Luxottica, Paul Mitchell, and Nescafe.

== Co-founding of Shakti Regeneration Institute and Princeton South Asian Studies Program ==
At 18, Pal-Chaudhuri returned to India for a 6-month solo pilgrimage, and used her modeling earnings to turn her family home into a charitable school, to give girls a better future. She named the foundation Shakti Regeneration Institute and the school Shakti Empowerment Education Foundation, and currently supports over 300 students annually, both girls and boys, also providing women with literacy and vocational training, as well as microfinancing, and continues as the school's executive director.

After high school, Pal-Chaudhuri met Markus Klinko, a classical harpist, who became a regular collaborator and the two began working together as the photography duo Markus + Indrani. According to Fast Company, "When Markus Klinko and Indrani Pal-Chaudhuri teamed up...both were already stars—Klinko as a classical harpist and Pal-Chaudhuri as a fashion model. Now they are famous for their iconic images."

Pal-Chaudhuri then received a scholarship to Princeton University where she studied cultural anthropology while working as a photographer in NYC. An advocate of cultural regeneration, at Princeton she campaigned and reinstated the study of Sanskrit, and led a student initiative to create a program in South Asian Studies. She graduated with a High Honors AB in Anthropology.

== Multidisciplinary artist ==
Pal-Chaudhuri works as a photographer, a director, director of photography, and producer of films, music videos, and commercials.

While Pal-Chaudhuri was a student at Princeton, David Bowie and Iman commissioned her first album cover, for Heathen and I am Iman with Klinko. Pal-Chaudhuri's fashion work was first used by Isabella Blow, who commissioned cover stories for the London Sunday Times. Around the same time, Ingrid Sischy at Interview magazine commissioned various shoots. Pal-Chaudhuri credits Blow, Bowie, and Iman for mentoring her and encouraging her to push her creative boundaries. Pal-Chaudhuri created album covers for Beyoncé's Dangerously in Love and Lady Gaga's The Fame Monster (Collector's Ed), Mary J. Blige's The Breakthrough and Mariah Carey's comeback Emancipation of Mimi and directed their music videos.

Pal-Chaudhuri's directorial career began with the music video for Bowie's song "Valentine's Day", exploring the mind of a high school mass shooter, in 2013. Her work and interviews are featured in the HBO / BBC Film David Bowie: The Last Five Years. Francis Whatley in an interview about the HBO / BBC documentary with Michael Bonner in The Uncut describes "Valentine's Day" as "Indrani's video. It is compelling. I think she captured something about him – and the story around how she did it is quite interesting...She had to draw out of him that he was singing about a killer."

Pal-Chaudhuri's work has been published in over 30 books and shown in over 20 exhibitions, and her portrait of Beyonce is on permanent exhibition at the National Portrait Gallery at the Smithsonian Museum in Washington D.C. In 2013 the Lincoln Center presented a week-long 30-piece public art exhibition Icons, to accompany the release of the photobook, Icons: The celebrity exposures of Markus and Indrani. Icons was described as "High-concept and hyperrealism commingle" by Kimberley Jones for The Austin Chronicle.

She directed a video and stills campaign with TBWA-Chiat-Day for Keep a Child Alive against AIDS in India and Africa. Pal-Chaudhuri directed a short documentary for PSI and the UN's Nothing But Nets featuring ambassador actress Mandy Moore. She directed The Girl Epidemic to raise awareness of the millions of girls missing in Asia due to human trafficking, child labor and female infanticide for Project Nanhi Kali with ad agency Strawberry Frog. Her short "Crescendo," curated by Pepsi's Beats of the Beautiful Game, uses football to empower girls in India in partnership with nonprofits Sambhali Trust, Yuwa, and SEEschool.

An exhibition at the Pacific Design Center LA was presented by the Lucie Foundation, Month of Photography Los Angeles and Farmani Gallery, and the Icons exhibition of her work was presented by The Angel Orensanz Foundation for Contemporary Art NY and Bravo TV to celebrate "Double Exposure" on 16 June 2010.

"The Legend of Lady White Snake" short film, with a poem by science fiction writer Neil Gaiman, "The Hidden Chamber" written and directed by Pal-Chaudhuri, is a re-imagining of an ancient Asian story, starring Daphne Guinness in costumes by GK Reid and Alexander McQueen.

"Till Human Voices Wake Us", a short film produced by Rick Schwartz, was written and directed by Pal-Chaudhuri, creative directed and executive produced by GK Reid, and stars Lindsay Lohan. An inversion of a poem by T.S. Eliot "The Love Song of S. Alfred Prufrock, it is a dream within a dream, of Selkies, Celtic mythical creatures that are women on land and seals in water, who storm Manhattan to save one of their kind, and the oceans. The film reminds viewers of the magic and mysteries of the creatures of the sea, and is a plea for sustainability of the oceans.

Pal-Chaudhuri has directed music videos including Alicia Keys' "New Day" described as "bold and high-energy" by Jenna Rubenstein for MTV, as well as music videos for Mariah Carey, Bon Jovi, and Mary J. Blige. According to Liz Smith at Variety, "Mary J. Blige attributes her success to many things, among them ... Indrani. They have had a long history of image-creating for Grammy-winning."

For Girl Rising, India, a feature-length film for girls' empowerment, Pal-Chaudhuri directed the Bollywood actors Freida Pinto, Priyanka Chopra, Alia Bhatt, Kareena Kapoor, Nandita Das Priyanka Chopra Sushmita Sen and Madhuri Dixit for the original Indian content, with a video and photo campaign which she also shot, that became part of the Indian government's campaign Beti Bachao, Beti Padhao (translation: Save girl child, educate a girl child).

Her The Great Artist was created to destigmatize and encourage discussion on mental health through the lens of the art world, inclusive of the LGBTQ+ and BIPOC communities, who are often underserved and were at greater risk during COVID. The film was created in partnership with various nonprofits, screened at the Cannes Film Festival, American Pavilion, 2022, qualified for the Live Action Short Film shortlist for the 93rd Academy Awards, and was selected by The Hollywood Reporter as one of the Oscars' Top 5 Live Action Shorts. "It is the climax that is truly brilliant -- one that earned the film a consideration for the Live Action Short Film shortlist for the 93rd Academy Awards...Are we all striving to achieve 'greatness' by holding our authentic self hostage? This is the haunting question that Pal-Chaudhuri leaves her viewers with," according to Prerna Mittra of The Indian Express.

== University lecturer, foundation director, and regeneration advocate ==
Shakti Regeneration Institute is a 501(c)3 nonprofit organization dedicated to regeneration and systemic change through education, media, and policy. Focusing on 5 of the UN Sustainable Development Goals (SDGs): SRI utilizes the powers of partnerships, nature-based solutions, science, technology, storytelling, art, film, and social movement marketing, to empower women, indigenous, and local communities. It was founded by Pal-Chaudhuri.

At the age of 18, Pal-Chaudhuri turned her family's palace into a foundation and school for economically challenged women and children. Providing free education to 300 children, vocational training, and micro-financing, outside her native Kolkata, India, with an emphasis on the rights of girls. She continues as executive director, "in charge of fundraising, advertising, and development."

== TEDx Speaker and advocate for sustainable energy independence, economic empowerment, and conservation ==
Pal-Chaudhuri is advocate for equality, empowerment, education, health, and environmental sustainability and regeneration. She was the recipient of Rotary International's high honor the Max Mark-Cranbrook Global Peace Maker Award in 2019.

Much of Pal-Chaudhuri's work and her films focus on the empowerment of women, and she is an abolitionist against human trafficking. Her "Girl Epidemic" short film, on the millions of girls missing in Asia due to child labor, female infanticide, and sex trafficking, was created in partnership with Anand Mahindra's Nanhi Kali Foundation and ad agency Strawberry Frog. Her "Girl Rising India," raises awareness of the importance of girls' empowerment, for which she raised the funding and directed Indian stars, which became central to Indian Prime Minister Modi's "Beti Bachao-Beti Padhao" social awareness campaign (trans: "Save the Daughter, Educate the Daughter"). Her "Crescendo" short film, which became part of Pepsi's "Beats of the Beautiful Game, shows how "sports uplift and empower girls to develop physical and mental strength, discipline, self-confidence, leadership and a sense of community." Her video and stills campaign "Digital Death" for HIV/AIDS in Africa and India, stars Kim Kardashian, Alicia Keys, Janelle Monáe, Serena Williams, and Usher, raised over a million dollars in a week for Keep A Child Alive.

== United Nations Distinguished Fellow and Princeton University lecturer ==
Pal-Chaudhuri was recognized at the United Nations as a Women's Entrepreneurship Distinguished Fellow 2018, She was the Convenor, Moderator and Speaker at the Science Summit at the United Nations, Digital Democracy for Climate Action sessions at the Harvard Club, in 2023-2025, curating conversations with leaders including Carlos Nobre and Indigenous Puyanawa leaders. She was Co-Host of the Global People's Summit 2018 during the General Assembly at the United Nations, with the President of the General Assembly and 190 countries live. She was also Special Advisor to the UNGMDF, its Tech World Forum, and the Fashion World Forum and Director of Relations at the UN World Film Forum 2013–2015.

Pal-Chaudhuri is a Princeton University Visiting Lecturer on "Moving Millions with Art and Film for Human Rights and Social Change." Indrani organizes and hosts Princeton Lewis Center's "The Art of Anti-Racism and Social Change" symposium, with actress Mo'Nique, Black Lives Matter NY Co-founder Hawk Newsome, civil rights activist/actress Gina Belafonte, Indigenous activist/actor Eugene Brave Rock (Wonder Woman).

== Television personality ==
Pal-Chaudhuri is a speaker and TV personality. She has been featured on shows including Access Hollywood, America's Next Top Model, and Make Me a Supermodel and Larry King Live.

Pal-Chaudhuri and her work as a director and photographer of David Bowie, were featured on the BBC / HBO Film David Bowie: The Last 5 Years.

Pal-Chaudhuri was the subject of a 6-hour docu-series Double Exposure, depicting her shoots with Lady Gaga, Kim Kardashian, Lindsay Lohan, and others. Her creative partner Klinko and producer GK Reid were also included, documenting their photo shoots from initial thought to hard copy. According to Troy Patterson of Slate, "Themes include the aesthetics of desire, the symbiosis of artist and muse." The show is described by Zoë Ruderman in Cosmopolitan Magazine as "like America's Next Top Model and Project Runway mixed together and on speed." Created in the US for the Bravo network, Double Exposure has been syndicated in over two hundred countries.

== Honors and awards ==
- 2009 – "Best of Show" (as Markus + Indrani) at Lucie Awards International Photography Awards.
- 2011 – Two Gold Lions at Cannes for "Digital Death" with TBWA-Chiat-Day for Keep a Child Alive combatting HIV AIDS in India and Africa.
- 2012 –"Best Picture," "Best Director," "Best Costume Design," "Best Visual Effects" and the "RED Epic Camera Award" at the Museum of Contemporary Art, San Diego, La Jolla Fashion Film Festival.
- 2015 – "Best of Festival" at the Princeton University Film Festival.
- 2015 – "Best Picture" at the International Fashion Film Awards presented by Cinemoi, at the Saban Theatre, Los Angeles.
- 2016 – "Best Picture," and "Best Director" at the London Fashion Film Festival.
- 2018 – "Inspirique: Circle of Light" Award at the Harvard University 2018 Global Forum.
- 2018 – "Women's Entrepreneurship Distinguished Fellow Award," at the United Nations Headquarters.
- 2018 – "Girl Epidemic" won "Best Picture" CNN Expose Film Awards for The Girl Epidemic.
- 2019 – "Hall of Distinction" at Havergal College's 125th Celebration, Roy Thompson Hall.
- 2019 – "Disruptive Innovation Award" at the Tribeca Film Festival.
- 2019 – "Max Mark-Cranbrook Global Peacemaker Award" presented by Rotary International, at the Arab American Museum, with the Center for Peace and Conflict Studies, Wayne State.
- 2020 – The Great Artist won "Best Picture" at the Festigious International Film Festival
- 2021 – Clubhouse "Creator First" Finalist.
- 2021 – The Great Artist was a Finalist screened in the Emerging Filmmaker Showcase at the Cannes Film Festival.
- 2021 – The Great Artist was Academy Awards Shortlisted.
- 2023 – "Best Short Film" at British Film Festival for "Reunited"
- 2024 – "Best Drama Short" at Los Angeles Independent Film Festival for "Reunited"
- 2024 – "The Rights of Nature" Keynote speaker at PopTech at The Kennedy Center
- 2024 – "Legacy Award for Impact Innovation" at The World Culture Film Festival
