= GK Reid =

American producer

GK Reid is an American producer and Chief Communications Officer, known for his work across industries with the top celebrities from David Bowie to Rihanna and Lady Gaga, to the biggest global brands, producing films, communications strategies, music videos, ads, marketing campaigns and commercials, especially for innovative creative direction and regenerative sustainability and social impact projects. Constantly working around the world, he was raised between sword-fighting school with Nahangs in India, and learning healing arts with his Curandera mother in New Mexico, before moving to New York.

== Career ==
GK Reid is known for his work with the largest brands, luxury products and design magazines such as V Magazine, Harper's Bazaar, "New York Times magazine", Vanity Fair, GQ, Interview, Flaunt, Vogue, Rolling Stone, and i.D. and has styled numerous ad campaigns for L'Oreal, Pepsi, Hugo Boss and fashion shows.

His work as producer and production designer on films and commercials has won 2 Gold Lions at Cannes Festival of Creativity for Digital Death/TBWA for a video and stills campaign against AIDS. His work also won the top 4 awards at the Fashion Film Festival La Jolla at the Museum of Contemporary Art San Diego, including "Best Picture" for his work as Producer and "Best Fashion" for his work as Costume Designer, and won "Best of Fest" at the Princeton Film Festival 2015, for "Legend of Lady White Snake" sponsored by MAC. GK Reid's designs for the film were exhibited in the windows of Barney's New York, at the Fashion Institute of Technology NY and at The Lincoln Center NY. The film was shown at SHOWstudio Cabinet London, the Pompidou Center Paris, the Australian Center for the Moving Image and the Lincoln Center.

Reid has worked with directors and photographers Peter Lindbergh, Inez van Lamsweerde and Vinoodh Matadin, Matthew Rolston Markus Klinko and Indrani, Anthony Mandler, Michael Haussman, James Mangold, Abel Ferrara, Diane Martel David LaChappelle Floria Sigismondi and in front of the camera with Steven Klein and Mario Testino.

His commercial clients include L'Oreal, Barney's New York, DeBeers, Hugo Boss, Shiseido, MAC, Puma, Nike and Pepsi.

== Press ==
Reid has received much press for his work. GK appeared on VH1's "The Short List" as an expert on Lady Gaga's style. He was one of the main subjects of the Bravo docu-series Double Exposure. Bravo follows him as he works closely with celebrities to express their inner selves through fashion that he finds around the world, and he is also cited as "the voice of reason" who keeps photo shoots and films on track. Double Exposure airs in the US on Bravo, and in over 100 countries around the world including Australia, Brazil, Mexico, Costa Rica, China, India, Thailand, Denmark, Canada and others.

== Special Projects ==
GK Reid produced a 6 part series on Bravo TV / NBC, called Double Exposure, for which he brought onboard Lady Gaga, Kim Kardashian, Lindsay Lohan, and Armie Hammer. He was a co-executive producer, conceptualizing the shoots, and designing costumes and accessories for Lady Gaga, for a series of photographs in homage to Hello Kitty, for Lady Gaga's The Fame Deluxe edition, Lady Gaga's "Book of Gaga" 2009, and for Hello Kitty's 35th anniversary campaign, photographed by Markus Klinko and Indrani. Reid designed a "dress completely made from toy versions of the cartoon-style cat" in only 2 hours. As well as shoes from lip glosses. This shoot and Reid's creation of the gown for Gaga is the subject of an episode of American fashion television series Double Exposure, on Bravo which has aired in over 100 countries, and the outfit was spoofed on the TV show Glee.

GK Reid produced shoots, designed for and styled Daphne Guinness for fashion magazines including the London Sunday Times, the New York Times Magazine, Muse Magazine the Observer, for the ad campaign for Daphne Guinness' Barneys New York window performance art piece, and for the film "The Legend of Lady White Snake: A Fashion Tribute to Alexander McQueen". These are featured in the "Daphne Guinness Exhibition" at the Museum at the Fashion Institute from September through January 2012, and in her book "Daphne Guinness." Reid was executive producer, production designer and wardrobe designer on the film "Legend of Lady White Snake" which won "Best Fashion," "Best Visual Effects," "Best Director" and "Best Film" at the world's largest Fashion Film Festival at La Jolla, Museum of Contemporary Art San Diego.

GK styled Rihanna's album covers for "Good Girl Gone Bad" and "Umbrella". Reid has styled Anne Hathaway, Katie Holmes, Eva Mendes, Julianne Moore, Mary J. Blige, Lindsay Lohan, and supermodels Naomi Campbell and Iman for magazine covers.

In 2004 GK was the creative director of a collaboration with author Neil Gaiman and artist Yoshitaka Amano in collaboration with David Bowie and Iman as sci-fi characters, for "The Return of the Thin White Duke" a portion of which was published in [V Magazine].

He has produced, styled and designed costumes for Jennifer Lopez for her album covers, music videos, and Billboard cover, Beyoncé for campaigns including L'Oreal, Kim Kardashian, Alicia Keys, Janelle Monáe, Jaden Smith and Willow Smith, and First Lady of France Carla Bruni-Sarkozy. Reid is responsible for Mariah Carey's transformation for her best-selling album The Emancipation of Mimi and was the costume designer for her perfume commercial directed by Peter Lindbergh. GK produced and styled Tim Gunn for the cover of his book "Tim Gunn: A Guide to Quality Taste and Style", Ryan Seacrest, Kanye West, Usher, Elijah Wood, Val Kilmer, Puff Daddy for music videos, and David Bowie for several album covers and magazines including covers of Rolling Stone and GQ. Reid was the producer and costume designer for David Bowie's music video "Valentine's Day" in which Bowie explores the mind of high school shooter.

GK was producer and EP of the Pepsi short film "Crescendo" featuring music by Jetta produced by Pharrell Williams, set in Rajasthan India, and described by Kyle Hodge of Complex Magazine as "A fun, colorful journey intertwining realism and fantasy through the streets of...India."

GK was a producer of "Girl Rising India -- Woh Padhegi, Woh Udegi" film and campaign with Priyanka Chopra, Amitabh Bachchan, Freida Pinto, Alia Bhatt, Kareena Kapoor, Parineeti Chopra, Nandita Das, Madhuri Dixit and Sushmita Sen all of whom GK also designed the fashions for and styled.
