= I Shall Not Hate =

2011 memoir by Izzeldin Abuelaish

- Author: Izzeldin Abuelaish
- Genre: Memoir
- Publisher: Walker Books
- Publication date: January 4, 2011
- Pages: 224
- ISBN: 978-0-8027-7917-5

I Shall Not Hate: A Gaza Doctor's Journey on the Road to Peace and Human Dignity is a 2011 memoir by Izzeldin Abuelaish which describes his life in Gaza and the killing of three of his daughters in 2009. It narrates both Abuelaish's own story and explores the history of the conflict, as well as supporting calls for peace between Israelis and Palestinians, stating that "violence begets violence and breeds more hatred".

== Background ==
Abuelaish grew up in a refugee camp in the Gaza Strip and studied medicine in Cairo, the University of London, and Harvard University. By the time of the 2008-2009 Gaza War, he had worked at two Israeli hospitals and was a well known public figure. In January 2009, an Israeli shell was fired directly into his daughters' bedroom in Gaza, killing three of them. Abuelaish, who had already been involved with the peace movement by this time, refused to let the killings make him hate or seek revenge, instead publicly arguing for co-existence between the Palestinians and Israelis.

== Reception ==
The book received positive reviews, and Abeulaish was later nominated for the Nobel Peace Prize. The Guardian wrote that the book is notable for containing a rare undistorted description of everyday life in Gaza, as well as life during the siege, which will serve as "an eye-opener for many readers". A review in The Daily Telegraph called the book "amazing", and according to the National Catholic Reporter, "Abuelaish's story does not demonize Israelis" but "offers an Islamic and medical perspective... to respond to the blood and tears of our time with a mixture of toil and sweat in pursuit of the common good." Iain McClure, a psychiatrist at the Royal Hospital for Sick Children, Edinburgh states that "every doctor should read this book" and notes that Abuelaish does not deny the anger he feels at the events, but recognizes the need for an "immunisation programme" against the "disease of hatred" through "respect, dignity, and equality".

The book has received several awards, including the Christopher Award, the Search for Common Ground Award, the Middle East Institute Award, and the Stavros Niarchos Prize for Survivorship.

The book was adapted into a play by the Mosaic Theater Company of DC in 2016, it was performed in Hebrew and Arabic with English subtitles, and was directed by Shay Pitovsky. Artistic director Ari Roth ended each performance with a discussion panel on the issues in the play, and Abuelaish himself attended the first performance.

The book was adapted by Tal Barda into the 2024 documentary film I Shall Not Hate.
