= Performance Network Theatre =

Theater company in Ann Arbor, Michigan (1981–2015)

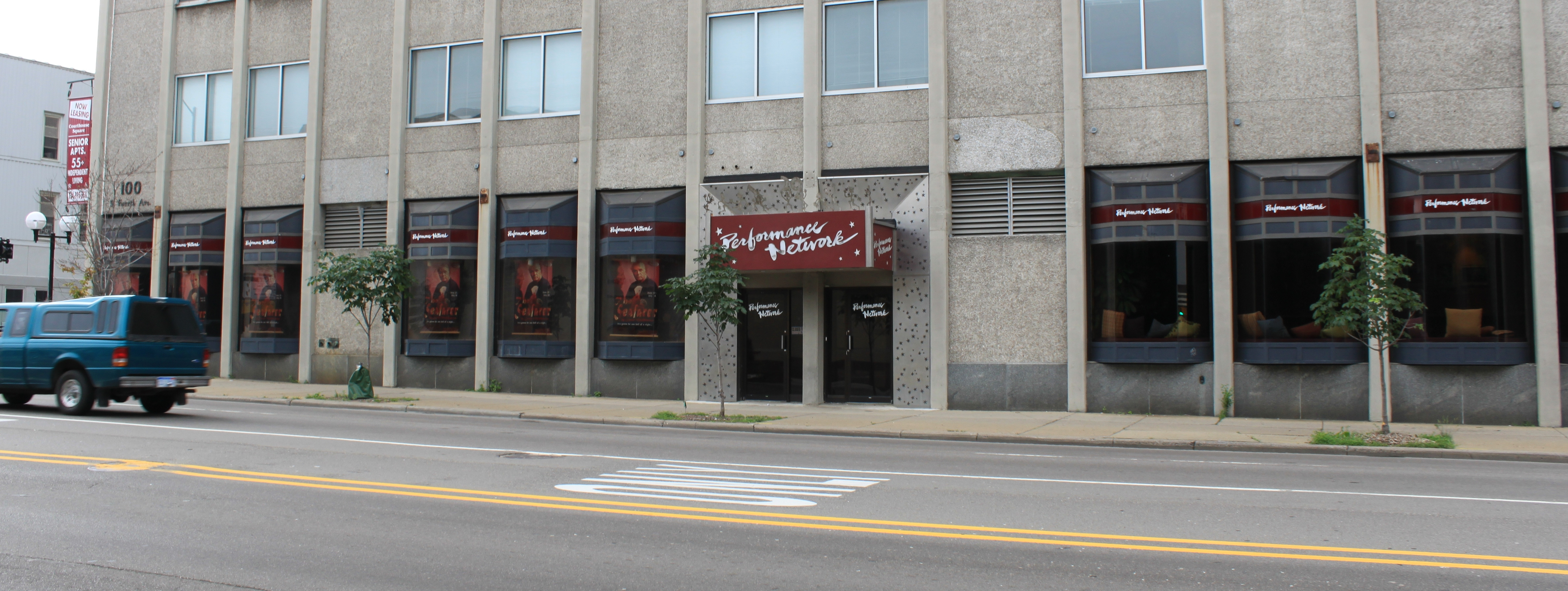
- Address: 120 E Huron; Ann Arbor, Michigan; USA
- Capacity: 140 seats
- Type: black box/proscenium

Construction
- Opened: 1981
- Closed: 2015
- Years active: 35

Performance Network Theatre, founded in 1981, was Ann Arbor, Michigan's premiere professional Equity theatre. It produced a wide variety of dramas, classics, comedies, Pulitzer Prize and Tony award-winners, many of which were World or Michigan Premieres. Its professional season included five to seven main stage productions. Other programming included seasonal productions that ran in repertory over the holiday season, the Northern Writers' Project—a week-long playwriting intensive, children's programming, the Fireside Festival of New Plays, the Open Table Series, the Open Stage series, music and more.

On December 18, 2015, the Theatre announced that it would close at the conclusion of the year.

== Overview ==
Performance Network was a 501 (c)(3) nonprofit organization that began its tenure in Ann Arbor in 1981. Performance Network became Ann Arbor's professional theatre in September 1997 and built an elegant theatre in the heart of downtown in September 2000.

Performance Network's primary stage, the Shure Theater, was an intimate space that seated 139 patrons.

== History ==
David Bernstein and Jim Moran founded the Performance Network Theatre in 1981 as an arts collective. In addition to Bernstein and Moran, active collective members in the playwriting group included Lyn Coffin, Davi Napoleon, Judith Ottmar, Al Sjoerdsma and Rochel Urist. The theatre evolved into a nonprofit corporation in the mid-eighties. After the departure of the original founders, the organization continued to produce and present experimental, original and socially relevant work under the cooperative direction of Linda Kendall, Annemarie Stoll, Johanna Broughton, (and in time, Peter Knox). Eventually, the early 1990s saw departures from the artistic staff leave the artistic direction in the hands of Johanna Broughton, who (with her husband Dan Walker, along with Carla Milarch and David Wolber) led the theatre from the 'Warehouse Years' to professional status and in 2000 moved it from Ann Arbor's Washington Street location to the corner of 4th and Huron, near the Kerrytown district. In 1997, Performance Network secured a contract with Actors’ Equity and established itself as Ann Arbor's professional theatre. In doing so, it was able to

- Increase the reputation of the Network by placing it in a higher tier of theatres nationally
- Gain access to plays of nationally recognized merit, unavailable to community theatres
- Increase artistic quality by hiring more experienced actors, directors, and designers
- Gain listing in respected theatrical publications and presentation by participating in the Michigan Equity Theatre Alliance, the National New Play Network, and Theatre Communication Group
- Expand the audience base by gaining press coverage in Southeastern Michigan publications.

In 2003, direction of the theatre was turned over to Milarch and Wolber. Under Milarch and Wolber, Performance Network excelled at choosing a wide range of artistically challenging shows and began receiving multiple awards for artistic quality. In order to continue producing high quality work Milarch decided to join Wolber in the Artistic department. In 2012, Performance Network switched to a dual leadership structure and hired Erin Sabo to partner with Wolber. In May 2014, the Board of Directors suspended all operations, as the theater did not have resources to pay its staff, actors and vendors in a timely manner, and to make debt payments. In July 2014, the Board announced that the theatre would reopen under the management of local actor-directors John Manfredi and Suzi Regan. Under the new management team, the Network produced one and a half seasons. Despite excellent reviews for some of the productions, both ticket sales and donations dropped precipitously. In October 2015, the theatre announced that unless it could raise $50,000 before Thanksgiving, it would need to close its doors permanently. The funding campaign failed to reach its goal. In December, the staff and Board of Directors announced that the theatre company was no longer sustainable.

== Programs ==
=== Professional Season ===
The professional season included classic and contemporary plays under a Small Professional Theatre contract with Actors’ Equity Association. Performance Network strived to include a classic play, musical, and world premiere in each season. The season began in the fall and ran a full year.

Patrons could purchase a subscription to the professional season that gives them tickets at a discounted rate. Alternatively, patrons could purchase "Flex Tickets" or anytime tickets to use in any combination for any number of shows they pleased over the course of the season.

=== Apprenticeships and Internships ===
Performance Network's Apprenticeship program offered a year-long paid position. It offered hands-on training in the areas of stage management, house management, development, marketing, and technical theatre. Apprentices developed experience in every aspect of theatre management.

Internships provided applicants a comprehensive experience in all elements of professional theatre, including box office, house management, and technical and clerical skills. Unlike the apprenticeship, which allowed apprentices to experience multiple areas of theatre, interns selected which field they would like to focus on.

== Staff, Board of Directors, and Associate Artists ==
In the Theatre's final 18 months, its staff members included:

- John Manfredi, Executive Director
- Suzi Regan, Artistic Director

Past staff members include:

- Erin Sabo, Managing Director
- David Wolber, Artistic Director

== Production history ==
The 1997 Productions:

- Mary Goldstein & the Author by OyamO
- River Dreams by Elise Bryant
- Some of My Best Friends Are... by Joan Lipkin, music & lyrics by Tom Clear
- The Tiger Bounds by Malcolm Tulip
- Viva, La Click-ka! by Rudolfo Valier Alvarado

The 1997 Guest Presentations:

- The Birthday Party by Harold Pinter
- Come Good Rain written and performed by Toronto actor/playwright George Bwanika Seremba
- Dance / Partners by Terri Sarris and Patricia Plasko
- Ellipsis Theatre Ensemble presents A Woman's Lot and Under a Rhyming Planet
- In the Heart of the Wood by Todd Jefferson Moore
- MorrisCo Art Theatre's Summer and Smoke
- MorrisCo Art Theatre presents Uncle Vanya
- Mosaic Youth theatre of Detroit presents What Fools These Mortals Be!
- Sensible Footwear - Comedic Feminist Terrorists
- Spring Dances Annual Choreographers Showcase
- Walk and Squawk presents Shameless Rainbow Youth Theater
- Walk and Squawk Performance Project's Who It Is

The 1997–98 Season (PNT's first Equity season):
(Johanna Broughton, executive director)

- Inverted Pyramid by Larry Dean Harris (world premiere)
- Life In Refusal by Ari Roth (Michigan premiere)
- Molly Sweeney by Brian Friel (Michigan premiere)
- Psychopathia Sexualis (play) by John Patrick Shanley (Michigan premiere)
- The Waiting Room by Lisa Loomer (Michigan premiere)
- White Picket Fence by Michael Grady (Michigan premiere)

The 1997-98 Guest Presentations:

- The 12th Annual Raise The Roof
- Autumn Dances Annual Choreographers Showcase
- Basement Arts presents A Midsummer Night's Dream
- Brilliant Traces by Cindy Lou Johnson
- Drop Dead by Billy Van Zandt & Jane Milmore
- Dutchman by LeRoi Jones (Amiri Baraka)
- Ellipsis Theatre Ensemble's Ave Maria Played Softly
- Ellipsis Theatre Ensemble's Why We Have A Body
- MorrisCo Art Theatre's Agnes of God
- Peridot Productions' No Exit
- Sensible Footwear - Comedic Feminist Terrorists
- The Shadow Theatre Company's The Complete Works of William Shakespeare (abridged)
- Spontaneous Me Productions's The Borstal Boy
- Walk and Squawk's How Could You Stoop SoLo?
- Walk and Squawk's Inhlanzi Ishelwe Amanzi

The 1998–99 Season:
(Johanna Broughton, executive director)

- Avenue X: An A Cappella Musical book & lyrics by John Jiler, music by Ray Leslee
- How I Learned To Drive by Paula Vogel (Michigan premiere)
- Innocent Thoughts by William Missouri Downs (Michigan premiere)
- Private Eyes by Steven Dietz (Michigan premiere)
- The Talking Cure by Rachel Urist (world premiere)

The 1998 Guest presentations:

- Autumn Dances Annual Choreographers Showcase
- Drake Enterprises' Moby Dick Rehearsed
- Ellipsis Theatre Ensemble's The Moon Wolf
- Jesse Richards & Hundredth Monkey's Animal Lovers Project
- MorrisCo Art Theatre's The Importance Of Being Earnest
- MOSAIC Youth Theatre's heartBEAT
- Open Theatre's Quartet
- Shadow Theatre Company's Closet Land
- Shivaree by William Mastrosimone

1999 TreeTown Performance Festival Guest presentations June - August 1999:

- Brass Tacks Ensemble's King Lear
- Heartlande Theatre Company's Mainstream
- Mercury Theatre Company's Office Hours
- Mosaic Youth Theatre's Everybody's Talkin'
- RAH Productions Strange Love & Unusual Sex
- Shadow Theatre Company's Echoes
- Terpsicore's Kitchen's Summer Dances

The 1999–2000 Season:
(Daniel C. Walker, artistic director)

- ...and Associates by Jerry Lax and Ed Stein (world premiere)
- As Bees in Honey Drown (Michigan premiere)
- Not Waving by Gen LeRoy (Michigan premiere)
- Picasso at the Lapin Agile by Steve Martin (Michigan premiere)
- The Ride Down Mt. Morgan by Arthur Miller (Michigan premiere)
- Three Days of Rain by Richard Greenberg (Michigan premiere)

The 2000–2001 Season:
(Daniel C. Walker, artistic director)

- Art by Yasmina Reza, translated by Christopher Hampton (Michigan premiere)
- Fuddy Meers by David Lindsay-Abaire (Michigan premiere)
- Maggie Rose by Kim Carney (world premiere)
- The Maiden's Prayer by Nicky Silver (Michigan premiere)
- Struggling Truths by Peter Mellencamp (world premiere)
- Wit by Margaret Edson (Michigan premiere)

The 2001–2002 Season:
(Daniel C. Walker, artistic director)

- Elizabeth Rex by Timothy Findley (American premiere)
- It's All True by Jason Sherman (Michigan premiere)
- Special Relativity by Richard Strand (world premiere)
- Stop Kiss by Diana Son (Michigan premiere)
- Taking Leave by Nagle Jackson (Michigan premiere)
- The White Rose by Lillian Garrett-Groag (Michigan premiere)

2002 TreeTown Performance Festival (June-Aug 2002):

- Anton in Show Business
- Chimera Theatre's A Streetcar Named Desire by Tennessee Williams
- Collection
- Dada Boy Paints on Canvas
- Ground Zen and Skinny Arms
- James McNeill Whistler
- Mosaic Youth Theatre - Heartbeat
- Peter Sparling Dance Company
- Terpsichore's Kitchen - Dancing in Summer

The 2002–2003 Season:
(Daniel C. Walker, artistic director)

- Copenhagen by Michael Frayn
- Defying Gravity by Jane Anderson (Michigan premiere)
- Man of La Mancha
- Necessary Targets by Eve Ensler (Michigan premiere)
- Sin by Wendy MacLeod (Michigan premiere)
- The Spirit House by Adam Kraar (world premiere)

2003 TreeTown Performance Festival (June-Aug 2003)

- Brass Tacks - A Work in Progress
- Brilliant traces
- LIMF Nodes - The Blue Hour by David Mamet
- Mosaic Youth Theatre - Reality
- Pangea - The Search for Intelligent Improv in the Universe
- Peter Sparling Dance Company
- Rowen Education Network - Candy Corn, Christ, and the Convoluted Creation of Golf
- Terpsichore's Kitchen - Dancing in Summer

The 2003–2004 Season:
(Carla Milarch, artistic director)

- The Home Team by Kim Carney (November–December 2003) (world premiere)
- Kimberly Akimbo by David Lindsay-Abaire (March–April 2004) (Michigan premiere)
- The Sins of Sor Juana by Karen Zacarias (September–October 2003) (Michigan premiere)
- Spike Heels by Theresa Rebeck (January–February 2004) (Michigan premiere)
- The Threepenny Opera by Bertolt Brecht, music by Kurt Weill, translated by Robert David MacDonald (April–May 2004)
- Tongue of a Bird by Ellen McLaughlin (October–November 2003) (Michigan premiere)

The 2004–2005 Season:
(Carla Milarch, artistic director)

- Boston Marriage by David Mamet (January–February 2005) (Michigan premiere)
- Humble Boy by Charlotte Jones (September–October 2004)
- She Loves Me by Joe Masteroff, lyrics by Sheldon Harnick, music by Jerry Bock (November–December 2004)
- The Stillness Between Breaths by Joseph Zettelmaier (March–April 2005) (world premiere)
- Summer and Smoke by Tennessee Williams (April–May 2005)
- Take Me Out by Richard Greenberg (July–August 2005) (Michigan premiere)

The 2005–2006 season:
(Carla Milarch, artistic director)

- A Doll's House by Henrik Ibsen
- A Life In The Theatre by David Mamet
- I Am My Own Wife by Doug Wright (Michigan premiere)
- Ice Glen by Joan Ackermann (NNPN rolling world premiere)
- Jacob Marley's Christmas Carol by Tom Mula (Michigan premiere)
- Moonglow by Kim Carney (world premiere), a co-production with Boarshead Theatre

The 2006–2007 season:
(Carla Milarch, artistic director)

- Amadeus by Peter Shaffer
- Candida by George Bernard Shaw
- Dirty Blonde by Claudia Shear (Michigan Premiere)
- The Fantasticks by Harvey Schmidt, book and lyrics by Tom Jones
- Language Lessons by Joseph Zettelmaier (World Premiere)
- The Retreat From Moscow by William Nicholson (Michigan Premiere)

The 2007–2008 season:
(Carla Milarch/David Wolber, artistic director)

- The Baker's Wife by Joseph Stein and Stephen Schwartz
- The Clean House by Sarah Ruhl (Michigan Premiere)
- The Day Everything Went Wrong by Malcolm Tulip (World Premiere)
- Doubt by John Patrick Shanley
- Exits and Entrances by Athol Fugard (Michigan premiere)
- The Little Dog Laughed by Douglas Carter Beane (Michigan Premiere)
- Souvenir (play) by Stephen Temperley (Michigan Premiere), a co-production with Boarshead Theatre

The 2008–2009 season:
(David Wolber, artistic director)

- A Feminine Ending by Sarah Treem (Michigan Premiere)
- A Picasso by Jeffrey Hatcher (Michigan Premiere)
- Fences by August Wilson
- Geoffrey and Jeffrey by Kim Carney (World Premiere)
- Nine Parts of Desire (play) by Heather Raffo
- Rosencrantz and Guildenstern are Dead by Tom Stoppard

The 2009–2010 season:
(David Wolber, artistic director)

- The Blonde, the Brunette and the Vengeful Redhead by Robert Hewett (Michigan Premiere)
- Christmas Carol'd by Joseph Zettelmaier (World Premiere)
- It Came From Mars by Joseph Zettelmaier (World Premiere), a co-production with Williamston Theatre
- K2 by Patrick Meyers
- Little Shop of Horrors Book/Lyrics by Howard Ashman, Music by Alan Menken
- The Seafarer by Conor McPherson (Michigan Premiere)
- Woman Before a Glass by Lanie Robertson (Michigan Premiere)

The 2010–2011 season:
(David Wolber, artistic director)

- Circle Mirror Transformation by Annie Baker (Michigan Premiere)
- The Drowsy Chaperone, Book by Bob Martin and Don McKellar, Music and Lyrics by Lisa Lambert and Greg Morrison (Michigan Premiere)
- Marie Antoinette: The Color of Flesh by Joel Gross (Michigan Premiere)
- Next Fall by Geoffrey Nauffts (Michigan Premiere)
- The Piano Lesson by August Wilson
- Sonia Flew by Melinda Lopez (Michigan Premiere), a co-production with the Jewish Ensemble Theatre
- The War Since Eve by Kim Carney (World Premiere)

The 2011–2012 season:
(David Wolber, artistic director)

- Ain't Misbehavin': The Fats Waller Musical Show, conceived by Richard Maltby, Jr. and Murray Horwitz
- Burn This by Lanford Wilson
- Dead Man's Shoes by Joseph Zettelmaier (World Premiere)
- God of Carnage by Yasmina Reza, translated by Christopher Hampton (Michigan Premiere)
- In the Next Room (or The Vibrator Play) by Sarah Ruhl (Michigan Premiere)
- Red by John Logan (Michigan Premiere)
- Time Stands Still by Donald Margulies (Michigan Premiere)

The 2012–2013 Season:
(David Wolber, artistic director)

- A Little Night Music with Music and Lyrics by Stephen Sondheim, Book by Hugh Wheeler
- Becky Shaw by Gina Gionfriddo (Michigan Premiere)
- Brill by David Wells, Music by Frank Allison (World Premiere)
- The Glass Menagerie by Tennessee Williams
- Good People by David Lindsay-Abaire (Michigan Premiere)
- The Mountaintop by Katori Hall (Michigan Premiere)
- My Name is Asher Lev by Aaron Posner, Adapted from the novel by Chaim Potok (Michigan Premiere), a co-production with the Jewish Ensemble Theatre

The 2013–2014 season:
(David Wolber, artistic director)

- An Iliad adapted by Lisa Peterson & Denis O'Hare, based on Homer's Iliad (Michigan Premiere)
- County Line by David Wells (World Premiere)
- Jerry's Girls with Music and Lyrics by Jerry Herman, Concepts by Larry Alford, Wayne Cilento, and Jerry Herman
- Richard III by William Shakespeare
- Venus In Fur by David Ives (Michigan Premiere)

The 2014–2015 season
(Suzi Regan, artistic director)

- Driving Miss Daisy by Alfred Uhry
- Gift of the Magi by Annie Martin and Suzi Regan
- Other Desert Cities by Jon Robin Baitz A co-production with the Jewish Ensemble Theatre (Michigan Premiere)
- Salvage by Joseph Zettelmaier
- Stones in His Pockets by Marie Jones
- This Wonderful Life by Steve Murray
- Yellow Man by Dael Orlandersmith

The 2015–2016 season
(Suzi Regan, artistic director)

- Dickens: An A Capella Carol by Charles Dickens
- Who's Afraid of Virginia Woolf? by Edward Albee—Holiday Shows:
- Why Not Me? A Sammy Davis Jr. Story by Tim Rhoze

== Affiliations ==
Performance Network Theatre was a member of the Theatre Communications Group (TCG), the National New Play Network (NNPN), Americans for the Arts, the Cultural Alliance of Southeast Michigan (CASM), the Ann Arbor Convention and Visitors Bureau (AACVB), and the Ann Arbor Chamber of Commerce. The Theatre's activities were supported by the Michigan Council for Arts and Cultural Affairs, and the National Endowment for the Arts.

== Awards ==
National Awards:

- 2013 Edgerton Foundation New American Play Award: County Line by David Wells
- 2011 Edgerton Foundation New American Play Award: Dead Man's Shoes by Joseph Zettelmaier
- 2009 Edgerton Foundation New American Play Award: It Came From Mars by Joseph Zettelmaier

Organizational Awards::

- Voted "Best Local Theatre" by Metro Times readers, 2009
- 2006 Critics Choice and Angel Award for Outstanding Service to the LGBT
- CommunityVoted "Best Theatre" by Current Magazine readers 1996–2008.
- Best Overall Season by the Oakland Press 2005
- The DeVine Award for Outstanding Contributions by the Detroit Free Press 2001 & 2005
- Non-Profit Excellence Award nomination - Non-profit Enterprise at Work, 1997 & 2000
- Governor's Arts Award nomination, 1998 & 2000

Wilde Awards:

2014

- Best Performance, Actor - Drama: John Manfredi - An Iliad
- Best Performance, Actress - Comedy: Maggie Meyer - Venus in Fur

2013

- Best Music Direction: R. MacKenzie Lewis - Little Night Music
- Best Musical: Phil Simmons, director - A Little Night Music
- Best Performance, Actor - Comedy: John Seibert - In the Next Room or The Vibrator Play
- Best Performance, Actor – Musical: John Seibert - A Little Night Music
- Best Performance, Actress – Musical: Naz Edwards - A Little Night Music

2012

- Best Design - Sets: Monika Essen - Red
- Best New Script: Joseph Zettelmaier - Dead Man's Shoes

2011

- Best Comedy: John Seibert, director - Circle Mirror Transformation
- Best New Script: Kim Carney - The War Since Eve
- Best Performance, Actor - Musical: Phil Powers - The Drowsy Chaperone

2010

- Best Actor - Comedy: Jacob Hodgson - It Came From Mars
- Best Actress - Comedy: Suzi Regan - The Blonde, the Brunette and the Vengeful Redhead
- Best Design - Lights: Andrew Hungerford - K2
- Best Design - Props: Charles Sutherland - It Came From Mars
- Best Drama: Tim Edward Rhoze, director - K2
- Best Musical: Carla Milarch, director - Little Shop of Horrors
- Best Production of a New Script: Tony Caselli, director - It Came From Mars
- Best Support - Musical: Aaron T. Moore - Little Shop of Horrors
- Best Teamwork: James Bowen & John Michael Manfredi - K2

2009

- Best Actress – Drama: Inga Wilson - A Feminine Ending
- Best Improv, Cabaret or Original Production: Malcolm Tulip, director - The Day Everything Went Wrong
- Best Performer – Play with LGBT Themes or Characters: Roxanne Wellington - The Little Dog Laughed
- Best Production with LGBT Themes or Characters: Ray Schultz - The Little Dog Laughed

2008

- Best Actor – DRAMA: Jon Bennett - Doubt
- Best Actress – DRAMA: Jan Radcliff - Doubt
- Best Actress – ORIGINAL / IMPROV / LGBT THEMES: Carla Milarch - Dirty Blonde
- Best Local Professional DRAMA: John Seibert, director - Doubt
- Best Local Professional Production with LGBT Themes or Characters: Jim Posante, director - Dirty Blonde
- Best Technical Design - Set: Monika Essen - The Baker's Wife

2007

- Best Actor – DRAMA: Malcolm Tulip - Amadeus
- Best Local Professional DRAMA: Malcolm Tulip, director - Amadeus
- Best Local Professional Production with LGBT Themes or Characters: Gillian Eaton, director - I Am My Own Wife

2006

- Best Lead Actor – DRAMA: Ray Schultz - Take Me Out
- Best Lead Actress – DRAMA: Carmen Decker - Moonglow
- Best Supporting Actor – DRAMA: Darrell Glasgow - Take Me Out
- Favorite Local Professional Production – COMEDY: Tony Caselli, director - Jacob Marley's Christmas Carol
- Favorite Local Professional Production with LGBT Themes or Characters: Jim Posante & Tony Caselli, directors - Take Me Out

2005

- Best Female Performer in a Local Professional Production – COMEDY: Gillian Eaton - Humble Boy
- Best Supporting Female Performer in a Local Professional Production – COMEDY: Laurel Hufano - Boston Marriage

2004

- Favorite Local Professional Production with LGBT Themes or Characters: James Posante, director - The Home Team
- Favorite Male Performer in a Local Professional Production – COMEDY: David Wolber - The Home Team
- Favorite Performer in a Local Professional Production – MUSICAL: Rochelle Rosenthal - The Threepenny Opera

2003

- Favorite Local Professional Production – MUSICAL / MUSICAL REVUE: Malcolm Tulip, director - Man of La Mancha
- Favorite Performer in a Local Professional Production – MUSICAL: Robert Grossman - Man of La Mancha

2002

- Best Local Professional Production – COMEDY: Carla Milarch, director - Special Relativity
- Best Performer in a Local Professional Production – DRAMA: Michelle Murphy - Stop Kiss

Rogue's Gallery Award Winners

2013 Winners

- Scenic Design (Proscenium Seating): Daniel C. Walker, Brill
- Lead Actress (Drama): Carla Milarch, The Glass Menagerie
- Lead Actress (Musical): Naz Edwards, A Little Night Music
- Lead Actor (Musical): John Seibert, A Little Night Music

2012 Winners

- New Play or Adaptation: Joseph Zettelmaier, Dead Man's Shoes
- Lighting Design (Proscenium Seating): Justin Lang, Red
- Lead Actress (Drama): Suzi Regan, Time Stands Still
- Properties Design: Monika Essen, Red
- Best Rogue: Drew Parker, Dead Man's Shoes [TIE]

2011 Winners

- Best Musical: The Drowsy Chaperone (director Carla Milarch)
- Choreography (Dance): Phil Simmons, The Drowsy Chaperone
- Lead Actor (Drama): Andrew Huff, Next Fall

Rogue's Gallery Award Nominees:

2013 Nominees

- Best Drama: The Glass Menagerie (director Tim Rhoze)
- Best Musical: A Little Night Music (director Phil Simmons)
- Sound Design: Carla Milarch, Good People
- Duo or Trio: Sarab Kamoo and David Wolber, Becky Shaw
- Best Rogue: Alex Leydenfrost, Good People
- Lead Actress (Drama): Carollette Phillips, The Mountaintop
- Lead Actor (Drama): Brian Marable, The Mountaintop
- Lead Actor (Drama): Kevin Young, The Glass Menagerie
- Supporting Actress (Drama): Naz Edwards, My Name is Asher Lev
- Lead Actress (Comedy): Suzi Regan, Good People
- Lead Actor (Comedy): Phil Powers, Brill
- Supporting Actress (Comedy): MaryJo Cuppone, Good People
- Supporting Actress (Comedy): Maggie Meyer, Becky Shaw
- Supporting Actress (Musical): Leslie Hull, A Little Night Music

2012 Nominees

- Best Drama: Time Stands Still (director Kate Peckham)
- Best Comedy: God of Carnage (director David J. Magidson)
- Best Musical: Ain't Misbehavin' (director Tim Edward Rhoze)
- Scenic Design (Proscenium Seating): Monika Essen, Red
- Lighting Design (Proscenium Seating): Mary Cole, Burn This
- Sound Design: Will Myers, Dead Man's Shoes
- Properties Design: Monika Essen, God of Carnage
- Choreography (Dance): Robin Wilson, Ain't Misbehavin'
- Choreography (Movement or Fight): Joseph Zettelmaier, Burn This
- Ensemble (2–4): God of Carnage
- Ensemble (5 or more): Ain't Misbehavin'
- Best Rogue: Darrell Glasgow, Burn This
- Lead Actor (Drama): Mark Rademacher, Red
- Supporting Actress (Drama): Heidi Bennett, Time Stands Still
- Supporting Actress (Comedy): Leslie Hull, In the Next Room or the vibrator play

2011 Nominees

- Best Drama: Sonia Flew (director David Wolber)
- Best Comedy: The War Since Eve (director David Wolber)
- New Play or Adaptation: Kim Carney, The War Since Eve
- Lighting Design (Proscenium Seating): Daniel C. Walker, Marie Antoinette: The Color of Flesh
- Properties Design: Charles Sutherland, The Piano Lesson
- Ensemble (2–4): Marie Antoinette: The Color of Flesh
- Ensemble (5 or more): The Piano Lesson
- Ensemble (5 or more): Sonia Flew
- Supporting Actor (Drama): John Seibert, Next Fall
- Supporting Actress (Comedy): Sarah Ann Leahy, Circle Mirror Transformation
- Lead Actress (Musical): Andrea Mellos, The Drowsy Chaperone
- Supporting Actress (Musical): Naz Edwards, The Drowsy Chaperone
- Supporting Actor (Musical): Matt Anderson, The Drowsy Chaperone
- Supporting Actor (Musical): Scott Crownover, The Drowsy Chaperone

AnnArbor.com::

- Best Local Play 2009: The Blonde, the Brunette and the Vengeful Redhead, David Wolber, director
- Best Acting Performances (male) 2009: John Manfredi, A Picasso, Will Myers, A Feminine Ending, James Bowen, Fences, Malcolm Tulip, Rosencrantz and Guildenstern are Dead
- Best Acting Performances (female) 2009: Inga Wilson, A Feminine Ending, Sheila Alyce Slaughter, Fences, Suzi Regan, The Blonde, the Brunette and the Vengeful Redhead
- Best Tech Achievements 2009: Monika Essen's set for Fences, Daniel C. Walker's lighting design for Rosencrantz and Guildenstern are Dead and Christmas Carol'd
- Best Locally Produced Show (2008): Doubt, John Seibert, director
- Best Performance (female) 2008: Jan Radcliffe, Doubt; Sarab Kamoo, 9 Parts of Desire
- Best Performance (male) 2008: Jon Bennett, Doubt, Robert Grossman, Exits and Entrances
- Favorite On-Stage Moments 2008: Roxanne Wellington and Barton Bund's power lunch in The Little Dog Laughed; Tom Whalen & Jim Porterfield's reconciliation scene, Geoffrey and Jeffrey
- Best Tech Achievements 2008: Daniel C. Walker's set for Doubt, Monika Essen's set for 9 Parts of Desire and Geoffrey and Jeffrey, Vincent Mountain's set for The Day Everything Went Wrong

Ann Arbor News:

- Best New Play 2007: Language Lessons, Joseph Zettelmaier
- Best Female Performance 2007 (tie): Carla Milarch, Dirty Blonde; Aphrodite Nikolovski, Language Lessons and The Clean House; Terry Heck, Language Lessons
- Best Male Performance 2007 (tie): Malcolm Tulip, Amadeus; Phil Powers, Dirty Blonde; John Seibert, The Baker's Wife
- Best Set Designer 2007: Monika Essen, designer
- Best Performance by a New Face 2007: Jacob Hodgson, Candida
- Best Production 2007: Amadeus, Malcolm Tulip, director
- Best Lead Actress 2006: Carmen Decker, Moonglow
- Best Lead Actor 2006: Malcolm Tulip, I Am My Own Wife
- Best Supporting Actor 2006: Loren Bass, Moonglow
- Best New Play 2006: Kim Carney's Moonglow
- Best Lead Actress 2005: Mindy Woodhead, Summer and Smoke
- Best Director 2005: Tony Caselli, Summer and Smoke
- Best Technical Achievement 2005: Monika Essen's set for Summer and Smoke
- Best Production 2005: Summer and Smoke

Detroit Free Press Awards:

- Best Play 2006: Take Me Out
- Best Director 2006: Jim Posante & Tony Caselli, Take Me Out
- Best Featured Actor 2006: Darrell Glasgow, Take Me Out
- Best Featured Actress 2005: Laurel Hufano, Boston Marriage
- Award for Outstanding Contribution to Theater in a season 2005: Gillian Eaton, Humble Boy, Boston Marriage
- Best Director 2003: Malcolm Tulip, Man of La Mancha
- Best Featured Actress 2003: Terry Heck, Necessary Targets
- Best Actress 2002: Gillian Eaton, Elizabeth Rex
- Award for Outstanding Contributions to Theatre 2001: Johanna Broughton and Daniel C. Walker
- Best Actress 2001: Jan Radcliff, Wit
