= Alliance for Jewish Theatre =

US-based non-profit organization

The Alliance for Jewish Theatre (AJT; formerly the Association for Jewish Theatre) is a non-profit cultural and educational organization based in the United States and an alliance of theatres, performance groups, and independent theatre-makers on the creation of Jewish and Israeli theatre. The organization changed its name from the Association for Jewish Theatre in late 2016.

== Organization ==
The Association held its first general meeting and first annual Jewish Theatre Festival at Marymount Manhattan College in June 1980. Norman Fedder and Steven Reisner are credited with being the movers behind AJT's founding. The organization sponsors yearly conferences, which are at times accompanied by theatre festivals.

The President of AJT is Hank Kimmel. Its Executive Director is Jeremy Aluma. The association sees itself as part of the ethnic theatre movement, inspired by the black and Latino theatre movements. According to The New York Times, the Association had "more than a score of members representing theater groups in the United States and Canada, from Phoenix, Ariz., to Winnipeg, Manitoba", by 1989, and was held to exemplify the "comeback" of explicitly Jewish theatre in America.
