= Izzeldin Abuelaish =

Canadian-Palestinian medical doctor

Izzeldin Abuelaish MSC, OOnt, MD, MPH, M. Hon. LLD., Litt D., D., Sc., D.H.L.
- عزالدين أبو العيش
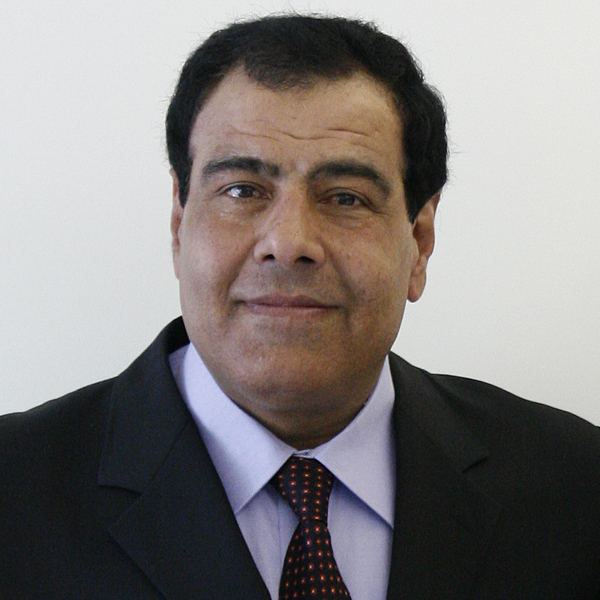
- Born: Jabalia Camp, Gaza Strip
- Education: University of Cairo MD; University of London OB/Gyn; Harvard School of Public Health MPH Subspeciality Infertility and Fetal Medicine
- Occupations: Full Professor, academic, author, non-profit founder, human rights and peace advocate. Founder and Chair of the board of Daughters for Life Foundation. Founder, leader and Director of the Global Institute of Socio-endemic Diseases, hatred, Health and peace at KU Leuven Belgium.
- Notable work: I Shall Not Hate: A Gaza Doctor's Journey on the Road to Peace and Human Dignity
- Title: Full professor of Clinical and Global Public Health Distinguished Visiting professor at KU Leuven
- Board member of: Founder and chair of the board of Daughters for Life Foundation
- Website: daughtersforlife.com

Izzeldin Abuelaish (Arabic: عزالدين أبو العيش) is a Canadian-Palestinian medical doctor and author. He was born in Gaza, and was a Palestinian doctor who worked in an Israeli hospital and has been active in promoting Israeli-Palestinian reconciliation. During the Gaza War in January 2009, his three daughters and niece were killed by Israeli tank fire directed at his home. He had been calling in reports about the effect of the war by phone to an Israeli TV station. In his regularly scheduled report, in tears, he described their killing on-air, in a video that was widely circulated in Israel and around the world.

He moved to Canada, where he was recruited by the University of Toronto and wrote a 2011 memoir entitled I Shall Not Hate: A Gaza Doctor's Journey on the Road to Peace and Human Dignity. He now resides in Toronto, Canada, with his remaining children.

== Life and career ==
Abuelaish was born and raised in the Jabalia refugee camp in the Gaza Strip. He received his elementary, preparatory and secondary education in the refugee camp schools. Abuelaish received a scholarship to study medicine in Egypt. After completing medical studies at Cairo University in 1983, he earned a diploma in Obstetrics and Gynaecology from the University of London.

From 1997 to 2002, he completed a residency in OB/Gyn at the Soroka Medical Center in Beersheba, Israel, followed by a subspecialty in fetal medicine in Italy and Belgium, then a master's degree in Public Health (Health Policy and Management) from Harvard University.

Abuelaish was the first Palestinian doctor to receive a staff position at an Israeli hospital, where he treated both Israeli and Palestinian patients. He worked as a physician in the Gaza Strip and also worked in Israel at Soroka Medical Center and Sheba Medical Center. After the Hamas takeover of the Gaza Strip in 2007, he was one of the few Gazans to continue entering Israel regularly. He lived in a multi-story building in Jabalia that he and his brother had built.

In 2008, his wife died of leukemia, and he was left to raise their eight children.

Immediately before the 2008–2009 Gaza War between Palestinian paramilitary groups and the Israeli military, he was a senior researcher at the Sheba Hospital in Tel Aviv and already an important figure in Israeli-Palestinian relations. His daughters had attended a peace camp with Israeli children in the United States.

During the three-week war, Abuelaish gave reports and interviews to the Israeli media on the situation in Gaza. On January 16, 2009, a few days before the end of the war, an Israeli tank fired two shells at his home, killing three of his daughters and a niece. An Israeli military investigation of the incident claimed that fire had been directed at his house after ″figures″ spotted on the roof of the building had been suspected of being observers directing sniper fire against Israeli troops. There was no reason to bombard the house and kill three innocent daughters and niece. The incident occurred as he had been corresponding live with Channel 10 reporter Shlomi Eldar, and his reaction to learning of the deaths of his daughters was broadcast live to Israeli audiences.

The killing of his daughters strengthened his resolve to promote truth, justice and reconciliation between Israelis and Palestinians.

He founded the Daughters for Life Foundation in memory of his three daughters who were killed. The organization provides scholarship awards to encourage young women from the Middle east and North Africa including Palestine, Israel, Lebanon, Jordan, Egypt and Syria to pursue their studies at universities in Canada, the United States and Belgium. The foundation aims to invest in the potential for young women's leadership and to foster their success.

In 2011 he was associate professor of Global Health at the University of Toronto.

And in 2019 was promoted to Full Pressor of Clinical Public health and Global health.

Abuelaish wrote a 2011 memoir entitled I Shall Not Hate: A Gaza Doctor's Journey on the Road to Peace and Human Dignity. The book has been translated into 23 languages and been national and international bestseller.

In February 2013, he attended the Karachi Literature Festival in Pakistan where he narrated the events surrounding the death of his daughters killed in the Israeli airstrike. According to The Express Tribune, "there was hardly anyone in the audience who did not choke or wipe away a silent tear while listening to Palestinian doctor and author Izzeldin Abuelaish..." Abuelaish described the event of his daughters' deaths as follows:

We are standing in the scene of the tragedy, in the place where four lovely girls were sitting, building their dreams and their hopes, and in seconds, these dreams were killed. These flowers were dead. Three of my daughters and one niece were killed in one second on the 16th of January at a quarter to five p.m. Just a few seconds, I left them, and they stayed in the room – two daughters here, one daughter here, one daughter here, and my niece with them.

The first shell came from the tank space, which is there, came to shell two daughters who were sitting here on their chairs. And when I heard this shell, I came inside the room to find, to look. I can’t recognize my daughters. Their heads were cut off their bodies. They were separated from their bodies, and I can’t recognize whose body is this. They were drowning in a pool of blood. This is the pool of blood. Even look here. This is their brain. These are parts of their brain. Aya was lying on the ground. Shatha was injured, and her eye is coming out. Her fingers were torn, just attached by a tag of skin. I felt disloved, out of space, screaming, "What can I do?" They were not satisfied by the first shell and to leave my eldest daughter. But the second shell soon came to kill Aya, to injure my niece, who came down from the third floor, and to kill my eldest daughter Bessan, who was in the kitchen and came at that moment, screaming and jumping, "Dad! Dad! Aya is injured!"

He became a Canadian citizen in 2015. In 2024, French director Tal Barda adapted Abuelaish's 2011 book into the documentary film I Shall Not Hate.

== Honours and awards ==
- 2009: Sakharov Prize for Freedom of Thought finalist
- 2009: Stavros Niarchos Prize for Survivorship
- 2009: Search for Common Ground Award of Search for Common Ground
- 2009: Middle East Institute Award of the Middle East Institute
- 2009, 2010, 2011, 2016: Nobel Peace Prize nominee
- 2009: Nominee, Sakharov Human Rights Prize
- 2009 & 2010: Named one of the 500 Most Influential Muslims Since 2009 until now by the Royal Islamic Strategic Studies Centre
- 2010: Uncommon Courage Award; Queens College Center for Ethnic, Racial and Religious Understanding
- 2010: Mahatma Gandhi Peace Award of Canada, Mahatma Gandhi Centre of Canada
- 2011: Lombardy Region Peace Prize
- 2012: Calgary Peace Prize, Calgary Centre for Global Community and Consortium for Peace Studies at the University of Calgary
- 2012: Dr. Jean Mayer Global Citizenship Award
- 2012: Middle Eastern Monitor Magazine Book Prize (London, UK)
- 2012: Walter Reuther Social Justice Award
- 2013: One of the 500 Most Powerful Arabs in the World
- 2013: Member of the Order of Ontario, awarded by the Province of Ontario
- 2013: Top 25 Canadian Immigrant Award winner
- 2014: Winner in the internationally reputed category of the Public Peace Prize
- 2015: Medicine and Health as a Catalyst to Peace
- 2015: Award of Excellence for Promotion of Human Rights and Peace
- 2015: Personality of the Year in Palestine
- 2016: Living Legend Award, Human Symphony Foundation (Washington, DC)
- 2016: Governor General Medallion
- 2017: Meritorious Service Cross, gifted by the Canadian monarch, his or her Governor-in-Council
- 2018: Max Mark Cranbrook Global Peacemaker, Wayne State University, Center for Peace and Conflict Studies. Eric Montgomery, Fred Pearson

=== Honorary degrees and citizenships ===
- 2011: Honorary Doctor of Laws, Queen's University
- 2011: Honorary Doctor of Laws, University of Manitoba
- 2012: Honorary Doctor of Laws, University of Western Ontario
- 2012: Honorary Citizenship from the Government of Buenos Aires, Argentina
- 2013: Honorary Doctor of Letters, Victoria College, University of Toronto
- 2014: Honorary Doctor of Laws, McMaster University
- 2014: Honorary Doctor of Laws, University of Saskatchewan
- 2014: Honorary Diploma in Peace and Conflict Studies, Sault College
- 2015: Honorary Doctor of Humane Letters, New College of Florida
- 2015: Honorary Doctor of Laws, York University
- 2015: Honorary Doctor of Laws, University of Calgary
- 2016 Honorary doctorate of Laws Brock University
- 2016: Honorary Doctor of Science, Simon Fraser University
- 2016: Honorary Doctor of Laws, Brock University
- 2016: Honorary Doctor of Laws, University of Windsor
- 2016: Honorary Doctor of Humane Letters, Saint Joseph's College of Maine
- 2021: Honorary Doctorate of Law; Doctorate Honoris Causa University of Antwerp, Belgium
- 2022: Honorary Doctorate of Laws Wilfrid Laurier University
- 2023: Honorary Doctor of Laws, Toronto Metropolitan University
- 2024: Honorary Doctor of Laws, University of British Columbia

== Works ==
- Abuelaish, Izzeldin (January 4, 2011). I Shall Not Hate: A Gaza Doctor's Journey on the Road to Peace and Human Dignity. Bloomsbury Publishing USA. ISBN 978-0-8027-7917-5.
