= Who Can I Be Now? (1974–1976) =

2016 box set by David Bowie

Box set by David Bowie
- Released: 23 September 2016
- Recorded: January 1974 – 23 March 1976
- Genres: Art rock; glam rock; R&B; soul
- Length: 509:59 (12 CDs / 13 LPs)
- Label: Parlophone
- Producer: Various

David Bowie chronology
Blackstar (2016)	Who Can I Be Now? (1974–1976) (2016)	Lazarus (Original Cast Recording) (2016)

David Bowie box set chronology
Five Years (1969–1973) (2015)	Who Can I Be Now? (1974–1976) (2016)	A New Career in a New Town (1977–1982) (2017)

Professional ratings
Aggregate scores
Source	Rating
Metacritic	92/100
Review scores
Source	Rating
AllMusic	4.5/5 stars
Mojo	4/5 stars
Uncut	4/5 stars
The Daily Telegraph	5/5 stars
PopMatters	8/10 stars
The Austin Chronicle	4/5 stars
Magnet	5/5 stars
Record Collector	4/5 stars
Under The Radar	9/10 stars
The Guardian	5/5 stars

Who Can I Be Now? (1974–1976) is a box set by English singer-songwriter David Bowie, released posthumously on 23 September 2016, focused on the artist's "American Phase". A follow-up to the 2015 compilation Five Years (1969–1973), Who Can I Be Now? (1974–1976) covers the period of Bowie's career from 1974 to 1976 over twelve compact discs or thirteen LPs.

== Overview ==
Exclusive to the box sets is The Gouster, a previously unreleased album that eventually became Young Americans, and Re:Call 2, a new compilation of non-album singles, single versions, and B-sides that serves as the sequel to Re:Call 1 from Five Years.

The box set includes remastered editions of the studio albums Diamond Dogs, Young Americans, and Station to Station, the latter in its original and 2010 mixes (the remix of Station To Station, by coproducer Harry Maslin, was first made available only on DVD-Audio within the 2010 deluxe edition of that album, and in this box set it's for the first time available in its entirety on CD and vinyl). It also includes David Live (in original and 2005 mixes) and Live Nassau Coliseum '76, a recording of Bowie's 23 March 1976 concert at Nassau Coliseum during his Isolar Tour, previously available on the 2010 special and deluxe editions of Station to Station.

The set comes with a hardcover book that includes photos from Eric Stephen Jacobs, Tom Kelley, backup singer Geoffrey MacCormack, Terry O'Neill, Steve Schapiro, and more, as well as liner notes penned by Bowie’s close collaborators Tony Visconti and Harry Maslin and a handwritten note from Bowie about The Gouster.

== Track listing ==
=== Diamond Dogs (2016 remaster) ===
All tracks are written by David Bowie, except where noted.

Side one
No.	Title	Length
1.	"Future Legend"	1:00
2.	"Diamond Dogs"	6:04
3.	"Sweet Thing"	3:39
4.	"Candidate"	2:40
5.	"Sweet Thing (Reprise)"	2:32
6.	"Rebel Rebel"	4:34
Total length:		20:29

Side two
No.	Title	Writer(s)	Length
7.	"Rock 'n' Roll with Me"	Bowie; Warren Peace	4:02
8.	"We Are the Dead"		5:01
9.	"1984"		3:27
10.	"Big Brother"		3:23
11.	"Chant of the Ever Circling Skeletal Family"		2:06
Total length:			17:59 (38:28)

=== David Live (original mix) (2016 remaster) ===
Side one
No.	Title	Length
1.	"1984"	3:21
2.	"Rebel Rebel"	2:40
3.	"Moonage Daydream"	5:07
4.	"Sweet Thing/Candidate/Sweet Thing (Reprise)"	8:33
Total length:		19:41

Side two
No.	Title	Length
5.	"Changes"	3:34
6.	"Suffragette City"	3:41
7.	"Aladdin Sane"	5:00
8.	"All the Young Dudes"	4:18
9.	"Cracked Actor"	3:25
Total length:		19:58

Side three
No.	Title	Writer(s)	Length
1.	"Rock 'n' Roll with Me"	Bowie; Peace (for the music)	4:16
2.	"Watch That Man"		5:04
3.	"Knock on Wood"	Eddie Floyd; Steve Cropper	3:20
4.	"Diamond Dogs"		6:29
Total length:			19:09

Side four
No.	Title	Length
5.	"Big Brother"	4:07
6.	"The Width of a Circle"	8:11
7.	"The Jean Genie"	5:17
8.	"Rock 'n' Roll Suicide"	4:47
Total length:		22:22 (81:10)

=== David Live (2005 mix) (2016 remaster) ===
Side one
No.	Title	Length
1.	"1984"	3:22
2.	"Rebel Rebel"	2:41
3.	"Moonage Daydream"	5:08
4.	"Sweet Thing/Candidate/Sweet Thing (Reprise)"	8:35
Total length:		19:46

Side two
No.	Title	Length
5.	"Changes"	3:35
6.	"Suffragette City"	3:42
7.	"Aladdin Sane"	5:02
8.	"All the Young Dudes"	4:14
Total length:		16:33

Side three
No.	Title	Length
1.	"Cracked Actor"	3:26
2.	"Rock 'n' Roll with Me" (Bowie, Peace (for the music))	4:16
3.	"Watch That Man"	5:05
4.	"Knock on Wood" (Floyd, Cropper)	3:24
Total length:		16:11

Side four
No.	Title	Length
5.	"Here Today, Gone Tomorrow"	3:48
6.	"Space Oddity"	6:26
7.	"Diamond Dogs"	6:26
Total length:		16:40

Side five
No.	Title	Length
1.	"Panic in Detroit"	5:39
2.	"Big Brother"	4:10
3.	"Time"	5:23
Total length:		15:12

Side six
No.	Title	Length
4.	"The Width of a Circle"	8:10
5.	"The Jean Genie"	5:19
6.	"Rock 'n' Roll Suicide"	4:46
Total length:		18:15 (102:37)

- On the CD version of the album, all the tracks are in the same sequence on two discs: disc 1 ends at "Watch That Man", disc 2 starts at "Knock on Wood".

=== The Gouster (remastered tracks) ===
Side one
No.	Title	Length
1.	"John, I'm Only Dancing (Again)" (not on Young Americans, first released as a single in 1979)	7:01
2.	"Somebody Up There Likes Me" (alternate early previously unreleased mix)	6:32
3.	"It's Gonna Be Me" (not on Young Americans, first released as a bonus track on the EMI/Ryko edition of Young Americans in 1990. An alternate mix with strings was released on the 2007 EMI edition of Young Americans)	6:30
Total length:		20:03

Side two
No.	Title	Length
4.	"Who Can I Be Now?" (not on Young Americans, first released as a bonus track on the EMI/Ryko edition of Young Americans in 1990)	4:42
5.	"Can You Hear Me" (alternate early previously unreleased version)	5:24
6.	"Young Americans" (same performance that ended up on Young Americans, alternate mix)	5:17
7.	"Right" (alternate early previously unreleased version)	4:40
Total length:		20:03 (40:06)

=== Young Americans (2016 remaster) ===
All tracks are written by David Bowie, except where noted.

Side one
No.	Title	Writer(s)	Length
1.	"Young Americans"		5:13
2.	"Win"		4:47
3.	"Fascination"	Bowie; Luther Vandross	5:48
4.	"Right"		4:22
Total length:			20:10

Side two
No.	Title	Writer(s)	Length
5.	"Somebody Up There Likes Me"		6:36
6.	"Across the Universe"	John Lennon; Paul McCartney	4:33
7.	"Can You Hear Me"		5:08
8.	"Fame"	Bowie; Lennon; Carlos Alomar	4:21
Total length:			20:38 (40:48)

=== Station to Station (2016 remaster) ===
Side one
No.	Title	Length
1.	"Station to Station"	10:17
2.	"Golden Years"	4:03
3.	"Word on a Wing"	6:04
Total length:		20:24

Side two
No.	Title	Writer(s)	Length
4.	"TVC 15"		5:35
5.	"Stay"		6:16
6.	"Wild Is the Wind"	Dimitri Tiomkin; Ned Washington	6:06
Total length:			17:57 (38:21)

=== Station to Station (2010 mix) ===
Side one
No.	Title	Length
1.	"Station to Station"	10:18
2.	"Golden Years"	4:03
3.	"Word on a Wing"	5:55
Total length:		20:16

Side two
No.	Title	Writer(s)	Length
4.	"TVC 15"		5:33
5.	"Stay"		6:15
6.	"Wild Is the Wind"	Tiomkin; Washington	6:07
Total length:			17:55 (38:11)

=== Live Nassau Coliseum '76 (2010 remaster) ===
Side one
No.	Title	Writer(s)	Length
1.	"Station to Station"		11:52
2.	"Suffragette City"		3:30
3.	"Fame"	Bowie; Alomar; Lennon	4:01
Total length:			19:23

Side two
No.	Title	Writer(s)	Length
4.	"Word on a Wing"		6:05
5.	"Stay"		7:24
6.	"Waiting for the Man"	Lou Reed	6:19
7.	"Queen Bitch"		3:12
Total length:			23:00

Side three
No.	Title	Length
1.	"Life on Mars?"	2:13
2.	"Five Years"	5:04
3.	"Panic in Detroit" (with most of drum solo edited out)	6:02
4.	"Changes"	4:10
5.	"TVC 15"	4:57
Total length:		22:26

Side four
No.	Title	Length
6.	"Diamond Dogs"	6:38
7.	"Rebel Rebel"	4:06
8.	"The Jean Genie"	7:25
Total length:		18:09 (82:58)

=== Re:Call 2 (remastered tracks) ===
Side one
No.	Title	Length
1.	"Rebel Rebel" (original single mix)	4:23
2.	"Diamond Dogs" (Australian single edit)	3:00
3.	"Rebel Rebel" (U.S. single version)	3:00
4.	"Rock 'n' Roll with Me" (live – promotional single edit)	3:29
5.	"Panic in Detroit" (live)	5:49
6.	"Young Americans" (original single edit)	3:17
Total length:		22:58

Side two
No.	Title	Length
7.	"Fame" (original single edit)	3:34
8.	"Golden Years" (original single version)	3:29
9.	"Station to Station" (original single edit)	3:41
10.	"TVC 15" (original single edit)	3:36
11.	"Stay" (original single edit)	3:22
12.	"Word on a Wing" (original single edit)	3:14
13.	"John, I'm Only Dancing (Again)" (1979 single version))	3:26
Total length:		24:22 (47:20)

== Charts ==
Chart (2016)	Peak position
Austrian Albums (Ö3 Austria)	75
Belgian Albums (Ultratop Flanders)	35
Belgian Albums (Ultratop Wallonia)	51
Dutch Albums (Album Top 100)	80
French Albums (SNEP)	63
German Albums (Offizielle Top 100)	28
Hungarian Albums (MAHASZ)	17
Irish Albums (IRMA)	38
Italian Albums (FIMI)	53
Norwegian Albums (VG-lista)	38
Scottish Albums (Official Charts)	20
UK Albums (Official Charts)	21
US Billboard 200	192
US Top Alternative Albums (Billboard)	24
US Top Rock Albums (Billboard)	36
