= Changesonebowie =

Compilation album by David Bowie
- Released: 21 May 1976
- Recorded: 1969–1976
- Genres: Rock, glam rock, art rock
- Length: 45:58
- Label: RCA Victor
- Producers: David Bowie, Gus Dudgeon, Ken Scott, Tony Visconti, Harry Maslin

David Bowie chronology
Station to Station (1976)	Changesonebowie (1976)	Low (1977)

Singles from Changesonebowie
- 1. "Suffragette City" Released: 9 July 1976

Professional ratings
Review scores
Source	Rating
AllMusic	3/5 stars
Encyclopedia of Popular Music	5/5 stars
Pitchfork	8.8/10
Robert Christgau	A
The Rolling Stone Album Guide	5/5 stars
Spin Alternative Record Guide	9/10

Changesonebowie is a compilation album by English musician David Bowie, issued through RCA Records in 1976. It collected songs from the 1969–1976 period, including the first LP appearance of "John, I'm Only Dancing". A "sax version" of this song, cut during the Aladdin Sane sessions in 1973, appeared on the first 1000 copies of the UK pressing (identified by the lack of the RCA logo in the upper-right corner of the cover). Later pressings of Changesonebowie featured the original version of the single that had been recorded and released in 1972. All US pressings of the LP contain this original version as well.

Two of the tracks, "Ziggy Stardust" and "Suffragette City", had never been released as singles when Changesonebowie was issued, though the former had been the B-side of "The Jean Genie" in November 1972 and the latter was the B-side of the "Starman" single and would be released as an A-side in July 1976 to help promote the compilation.

The album was followed up by a companion compilation, Changestwobowie, in 1981.

== Album history ==
RCA Records reissued Changesonebowie on CD in 1984, but it was withdrawn shortly afterwards, along with the rest of Bowie's RCA catalogue, due to a conflict between Bowie and RCA. The RCA CD contains the original single version of "John, I'm Only Dancing".

When the Bowie catalogue was reissued by Rykodisc beginning in 1990, Changesonebowie was replaced by a new compilation, Changesbowie, on which "Fame" was superseded by the "Gass Mix" of "Fame 90" (produced and remixed by Jon Gass) and "'Heroes'", "Ashes to Ashes", "Fashion", "Let's Dance", "China Girl", "Modern Love", and "Blue Jean" were added. In addition to the above, Rykodisc added the songs "Starman" (following "Space Oddity"), "Life on Mars?" (following "The Jean Genie"), and "Sound and Vision" (following "Golden Years") to the double-LP editions of the album.

A remastered edition of the original Changesonebowie compilation was released on 20 May 2016, on vinyl and CD, to mark its 40th anniversary. On 13 April 2018, Changesonebowie was released in digital/streaming formats, along with a newly remastered edition of its follow-up, Changestwobowie, on vinyl, CD and digital/streaming.

The cover provided the inspiration for the 2009 expanded edition of the Morrissey album Southpaw Grammar.

== Acclaim ==
In 1987, as part of their 20th anniversary, Rolling Stone magazine ranked it number 96 on "The Top 100 Albums of the Last Twenty Years." In 2003, the album was ranked number 425 on Rolling Stone magazine's list of The 500 Greatest Albums of All Time.

== Track listing ==
All tracks are written by David Bowie, except where noted.

Side one
No.	Title	Original release	Length
1.	"Space Oddity"	Space Oddity (1969)	5:14
2.	"John, I'm Only Dancing" (sax version)	Single A-side (1972)	2:43
3.	"Changes"	Hunky Dory (1971)	3:33
4.	"Ziggy Stardust"	The Rise and Fall of Ziggy Stardust and the Spiders from Mars (1972)	3:13
5.	"Suffragette City"	The Rise and Fall of Ziggy Stardust and the Spiders from Mars	3:25
6.	"The Jean Genie"	Aladdin Sane (1973)	4:03
Total length:			22:11

Side two
No.	Title	Writer(s)	Original release	Length
1.	"Diamond Dogs"		Diamond Dogs (1974)	5:56
2.	"Rebel Rebel"		Diamond Dogs	4:30
3.	"Young Americans"		Young Americans (1975)	5:10
4.	"Fame"	Bowie, Carlos Alomar, John Lennon	Young Americans	4:12
5.	"Golden Years"		Station to Station (1976)	3:59
Total length:				23:47 (45:58)

== Personnel ==
- David Bowie – vocals, guitars, keyboards, saxophone, harmonica, stylophone, Moog, Mellotron, backing vocals
- Tim Renwick – guitar (side one-1)
- Mick Wayne – guitar (side one-1)
- Rick Wakeman – mellotron (side one-1)
- Herbie Flowers – bass (side one-1, side two 1,2)
- Terry Cox – drums (side one-1)
- Mick Ronson – guitars, piano, moog, backing vocals (side one 2–6)
- Trevor Bolder – bass (side one 2–6)
- Mick Woodmansey – drums (side one 2–6)
- Tony Newmark – drums (side two 1)
- Aynsley Dunbar – drums (side two 2)
- Carlos Alomar – guitars (side two 3,4,5)
- Earl Slick – guitars (side two 4,5)
- John Lennon – guitar, backing vocals (side two 4)
- Mike Garson – Piano, keyboards (side one 2–6, side two 1–4)
- Roy Bittan – piano (side two 5)
- Willie Weeks – bass (side two 9)
- Emir Ksasan – bass (side two 10)
- George Murray – bass (side two 5)
- Andy Newmark – drums (side two 3)
- Dennis Davis – drums (side two 4,5)
- David Sanborn – saxophone (side two 3)
- Pablo Rosario – percussion (side two 3)
- Larry Washington – percussion (side two 3)
- Ralph Mcdonald – percussion (side two 4)
- Ava Cherry, Robin Clark, Anthony Hinton, Diane Sumler, Luther Vandross – backing vocals (side two 3)
- Warren Peace – backing vocals (side two 3,5)
- Jean Millington, Jean Fineberg – backing vocals (side two 4)
- Harry Maslin – editing, assembling, and mastering

== Charts ==
=== Weekly charts ===
Chart (1976)	Peak position
Australian Albums (Kent Music Report)	8
New Zealand Albums (RMNZ)	8
UK Albums (OCC)	2
US Billboard Top LPs & Tape	10
Chart (2016)	Peak position
Belgian Albums (Ultratop Flanders)	59
Belgian Albums (Ultratop Wallonia)	89
French Albums (SNEP)	197
Hungarian Albums (MAHASZ)	14
Irish Albums (IRMA)	49
UK Albums (OCC)	32

=== Year-end charts ===
Chart (1976)	Peak position
Australia (Kent Music Report)	19
UK Albums (OCC)	17
US Billboard 200	95

== Certifications ==
Certifications for "Changesonebowie"
Region	Certification	Certified units/sales
Canada (Music Canada)	2× Platinum	200,000^{^}
United States (RIAA)	Platinum	1,000,000^{^}
^{^} Shipments figures based on certification alone.
