= The 1980 Floor Show =

David Bowie musical spectacle

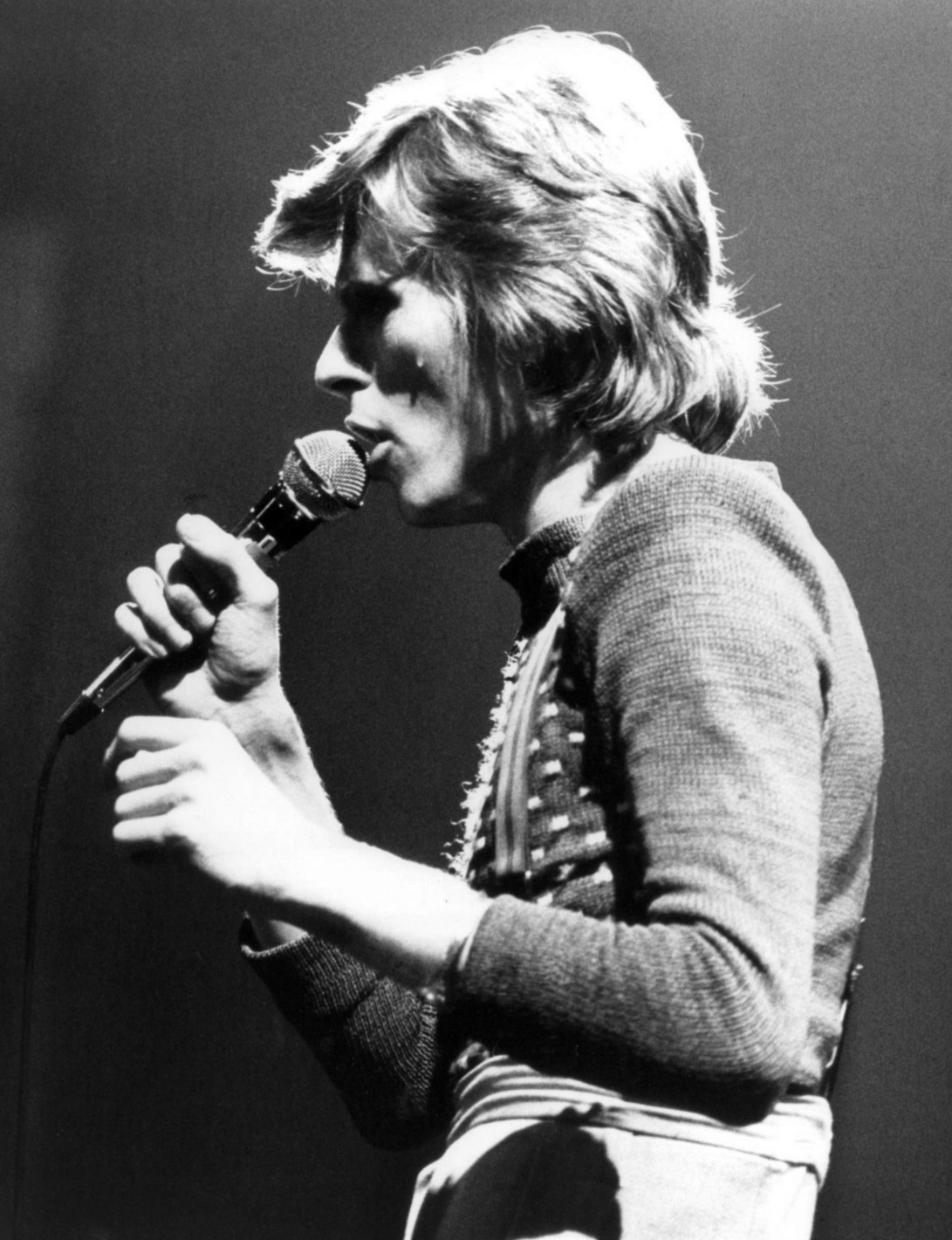
David Bowie 1974

The 1980 Floor Show was a rock musical spectacle featuring English rock musician David Bowie as the protagonist, held at the Marquee Club in Soho, London, on October 18–20, 1973. It was broadcast in the United States by NBC on November 16, 1973, as part of the series The Midnight Special, and presented the last performance of Bowie as his character Ziggy Stardust.

== Lineup and content ==
Still image from the 1980 Floor Show, segment featuring Marianne Faithfull and David Bowie

The lineup included songs from the albums Aladdin Sane and Pin Ups, as well as a medley of "1984" with the then-unreleased song "Dodo". The title of the show was a play-on-words, referring to the song "1984" and "floor shows", capturing a transitional moment between the glamorous science fiction of the previous year's The Rise and Fall of Ziggy Stardust and the Spiders from Mars album and the dark dystopia of the Diamond Dogs album, released six months later. The live audience was made up of 200 fan club members.

== Visual elements ==
The visual elements of the show referenced the Ziggy Stardust character, who, along with the Spiders from Mars, had been terminated by Bowie after a performance on July 3, 1973. The troupe of dancers wore crocheted cobweb-like costumes, and Bowie sported outfits designed by Freddi Buretti, Kansai Yamamoto and Natasha Korniloff, most notably a body-stocking outfit with a flame motif, as well as a fishnet full-leotard with stuffed gold lamé hands. The keyhole-cutout half-leotard outfit was inspired by the Dada artist/poet Tristan Tzara's 1921 production of Le Cœur à gaz. The choreography by Matt Mattox featured a sequence of dancers spelling out the words "1980", "Floor" and "Show" with their bodies.

== Unauthorized releases ==
A bootleg record of The 1980 Floor Show, titled Dollars in Drag - The 1980 Floor Show, was released by The Amazing Kornyphone Record Label in 1974 (ASIN: B00RC7WEEO). A multi-disc DVD was later issued, showing some of Bowie's and his guests' lavish costumes and including excerpts of rehearsals and false starts.

== Cast ==
- David Bowie – vocals, guitar, tambourine, harmonica
- Mick Ronson – electric guitar, backing vocals
- Trevor Bolder – electric bass
- Aynsley Dunbar – drums
- Mike Garson – keyboards
- Mark Carr-Pritchard (AKA Mark Pritchett) – guitar
- The Astronettes (Ava Cherry, Jason Guess, Geoffrey MacCormack) - backup singers

== Guests ==
- Marianne Faithfull
- The Troggs
- Amanda Lear
- Carmen

== Repertoire ==
Lyrics and music by David Bowie, unless otherwise indicated.

- "1984 / Dodo"
- "Sorrow" (Feldman / Goldstein / Gottehrer) – A cover of The McCoys
- "Bulerias" (David Allen) – Performed by Carmen, a Spanish glamenco/flamenco group produced by Tony Visconti
- "Everything's Alright" (Crouch / Konrad / Stavely / James / Karlson) – A cover of The Mojos
- "Space Oddity"
- "I Can't Explain" (Pete Townshend) – A cover of The Who
- "As Tears Go By" (Mick Jagger / Keith Richards / Andrew Loog Oldham ) – A cover of The Rolling Stones, performed by Marianne Faithfull
- "Time"
- "Wild Thing" (Chip Taylor) – Performed by The Troggs
- "Bullfight" (Roberto Amaral) – Performed by Carmen
- "The Jean Genie"
- "Rock 'n' Roll Suicide" [Unaired performance]
- "20th Century Blues" (Noël Coward) – A cover of Noël Coward, performed by Marianne Faithfull
- "Can Not Control Myself" (Reg Presley) – Performed by The Troggs
- "Strange Movies" (Reg Presley) – Performed by The Troggs
- "I Got You Babe" (Sonny Bono) – A cover of Sonny & Cher, performed by David Bowie and Marianne Faithfull

== Credits ==
- Stan Harris – director and producer
- Rocco Urbisci – creative consultant
- Jaques Andre – associate producer
- Matt Mattox – choreographer
- Freddi Burretti – costume designer
- Kansai Yamamoto – costume designer
- Natasha Korniloff – costume designer
- Barbara Daley – make-up artist
- Billy The Kid – hairdresser
- George Underwood – Graphic Designer
- Ken Scott & Ground Control (Robin Mayhew) – mix
