= Cracked Actor (Live Los Angeles '74) =

2017 live album by David Bowie

Live album by Bowie
- Released: 22 April 2017
- Recorded: 5 September 1974
- Venue: Universal Amphitheatre, Universal City, Los Angeles, California
- Genre: Glam rock; R&B
- Length: 97:04
- Label: Parlophone
- Producer: David Bowie

Bowie chronology
Live Nassau Coliseum '76 (2017)	Cracked Actor (Live Los Angeles '74) (2017)	A New Career in a New Town (1977–1982) (2017)

Cracked Actor (Live Los Angeles '74) is a live album by the English singer-songwriter David Bowie. It was released posthumously as a Record Store Day release on 22 April 2017 through Parlophone record label. Produced by Bowie and mixed by Tony Visconti, it was recorded on the Diamond Dogs Tour in September 1974, some material from which appeared in the BBC documentary Cracked Actor.

The full show spans across five sides of vinyl, with the sixth featuring an etching of Bowie. The album differs from the first Bowie live album, David Live, recorded on the same tour. It features a different and more R&B-oriented lineup, including long time collaborators Earl Slick and Carlos Alomar, as well as backing singer Luther Vandross. The setlist also includes material recorded for The Gouster, an album which later would turn into Young Americans.

The album received a wider release on CD through the same label on 16 June 2017.

== Critical reception ==
Professional ratings
Review scores
Source	Rating
Pitchfork	8.0/10

Pitchfork critic Chris Randle wrote: "Hearing drums here distinct from murk, you can tell how complex the rhythm of '1984' was, its groove swerving in circles to welcome every new element. Bowie spent the mid-‘70s obsessed with power, wielding it through deeper and deeper timbre, until his seductions seemed purged of emotion: a ballad sung by a vampire. Cracked Actor shows he was already using his phrasing to command attention."

== Track listing ==
All tracks written by David Bowie, except where noted

Disc one
No.	Title	Writer(s)	Length
1.	"Introduction"		1:47
2.	"1984"		2:55
3.	"Rebel Rebel"		2:31
4.	"Moonage Daydream"		5:17
5.	"Sweet Thing / Candidate / Sweet Thing" (Reprise)		7:41
6.	"Changes"		3:47
7.	"Suffragette City"		3:49
8.	"Aladdin Sane"		5:01
9.	"All The Young Dudes"		4:09
10.	"Cracked Actor"		3:20
11.	"Rock 'n' Roll with Me"	Bowie; Warren Peace	4:54

Disc two
No.	Title	Writer(s)	Length
12.	"Knock On Wood"	Steve Cropper; Eddie Floyd	3:16
13.	"It's Gonna Be Me"		7:11
14.	"Space Oddity"		5:23
15.	"Diamond Dogs"		6:58
16.	"Big Brother"		4:05
17.	"Time"		5:44
18.	"The Jean Genie"		5:45
19.	"Rock 'n' Roll Suicide"		5:10
20.	"John, I'm Only Dancing (Again)"		8:41

== Personnel ==
- David Bowie – vocals
- Earl Slick – guitar
- Carlos Alomar – rhythm guitar
- Mike Garson – piano, mellotron
- David Sanborn – alto saxophone, flute
- Richard Grando – baritone saxophone, flute
- Doug Rauch – bass
- Greg Errico – drums
- Pablo Rosario – percussion
- Gui Andrisano – backing vocals
- Warren Peace – backing vocals
- Ava Cherry – backing vocals
- Robin Clark – backing vocals
- Anthony Hinton – backing vocals
- Diane Sumler – backing vocals
- Luther Vandross – backing vocals

== Charts ==
Chart (2017)	Peak position
Austrian Albums (Ö3 Austria)	73
Belgian Albums (Ultratop Flanders)	50
Belgian Albums (Ultratop Wallonia)	83
Dutch Albums (Album Top 100)	49
French Albums (SNEP)	191
German Albums (Offizielle Top 100)	88
Irish Albums (IRMA)	19
Italian Albums (FIMI)	51
Scottish Albums (OCC)	11
Spanish Albums (Promusicae)	95
UK Albums (OCC)	20
