= Changesbowie =

Compilation album by David Bowie
- Released: 12 March 1990
- Recorded: 1969–1985
- Genres: Rock; glam rock
- Length: 74:32
- Label: Rykodisc/EMI
- Producer: Varies from track to track

David Bowie chronology
Sound + Vision (1989)	Changesbowie (1990)	Early On (1964–1966) (1991)

Singles from David Bowie
- 1. "Fame '90" Released: 26 March 1990

Professional ratings
Review scores
Source	Rating
AllMusic	5/5 stars
Encyclopedia of Popular Music	3/5 stars
Q	4/5 stars
The Rolling Stone Album Guide	5/5 stars
Spin	5/5 stars
The Village Voice	A
Spin Alternative Record Guide	10/10

Changesbowie is a compilation album by English rock musician David Bowie, released by Rykodisc in the US and by EMI in the UK in 1990. The compilation was part of Rykodisc's remastered Bowie reissue series, replacing the deleted RCA Records compilations Changesonebowie and Changestwobowie.

== Reception ==
While the cover artwork was dismissed by author David Buckley as "a sixth-form cut 'n' paste collage", the collection gave Bowie his first UK chart-topping album since Tonight in 1984. The Guinness Book of British Hit Albums noted that Changesbowie was "his seventh album to enter the chart at number one. Nobody else had debuted at the top as often."

== Track listing ==
All tracks are written by David Bowie, except where noted.

No.	Title	Writer(s)	Place of Origin	Length
1.	"Space Oddity"		David Bowie (1969)	5:16
2.	"John, I'm Only Dancing"		Non-album single (1972)	2:49
3.	"Changes"		Hunky Dory (1971)	3:36
4.	"Ziggy Stardust"		The Rise and Fall of Ziggy Stardust and the Spiders from Mars	3:13
5.	"Suffragette City"		The Rise and Fall of Ziggy Stardust and the Spiders from Mars	3:28
6.	"The Jean Genie"		Aladdin Sane (1973)	4:09
7.	"Diamond Dogs"		Diamond Dogs (1974)	6:06
8.	"Rebel Rebel"		Diamond Dogs	4:31
9.	"Young Americans"		Young Americans (1975)	5:13
10.	"Fame '90" (Gass mix)	Bowie, Carlos Alomar, John Lennon	Fame '90 CD single (1990)	3:40
11.	"Golden Years"		Station to Station (1976)	4:03
12.	""Heroes"" (Single version)	Bowie, Brian Eno	"Heroes" (1977)	3:38
13.	"Ashes to Ashes"		Scary Monsters (And Super Creeps) (1980)	4:25
14.	"Fashion"		Scary Monsters (And Super Creeps)	4:49
15.	"Let's Dance" (Single version)		Let's Dance (1983)	4:10
16.	"China Girl" (Single version)	Bowie, Iggy Pop	Let's Dance; originally by Iggy Pop from The Idiot (1977)	4:17
17.	"Modern Love" (Single version)		Let's Dance	3:59
18.	"Blue Jean"		Tonight (1984)	3:10
Total length:				74:32

=== LP and Cassette versions (EMI) ===
"Starman", "Life on Mars?", and "Sound and Vision" were included exclusively on the EMI-branded LP and cassette versions.

All tracks are written by David Bowie, except where noted.

Side one
No.	Title	Place of Origin	Length
1.	"Space Oddity"	David Bowie (1969)	5:16
2.	"Starman"	The Rise and Fall of Ziggy Stardust and the Spiders from Mars (1972)	4:16
3.	"John, I'm Only Dancing"	Non-album single (1972)	2:49
4.	"Changes"	Hunky Dory (1971)	3:36
5.	"Ziggy Stardust"	The Rise and Fall of Ziggy Stardust and the Spiders from Mars	3:13
6.	"Suffragette City"	The Rise and Fall of Ziggy Stardust and the Spiders from Mars	3:28

Side two
No.	Title	Place of Origin	Length
7.	"The Jean Genie"	Aladdin Sane (1973)	4:09
8.	"Life on Mars?"	Hunky Dory	3:54
9.	"Diamond Dogs"	Diamond Dogs (1974)	6:06
10.	"Rebel Rebel"	Diamond Dogs	4:31
11.	"Young Americans"	Young Americans (1975)	5:13

Side three
No.	Title	Writer(s)	Place of Origin	Length
12.	"Fame '90" (Gass mix)	Bowie, Carlos Alomar, John Lennon	Fame '90 CD single (1990)	3:40
13.	"Golden Years"		Station to Station (1976)	4:03
14.	"Sound and Vision"		Low (1977)	3:03
15.	""Heroes"" (Single version)	Bowie, Brian Eno	"Heroes" (1977)	3:38
16.	"Ashes to Ashes"		Scary Monsters (And Super Creeps) (1980)	4:25

Side four
No.	Title	Writer(s)	Place of Origin	Length
17.	"Fashion"		Scary Monsters (And Super Creeps)	4:49
18.	"Let's Dance" (Single version)		Let's Dance (1983)	4:10
19.	"China Girl" (Single version)	Bowie, Iggy Pop	Let's Dance; originally by Iggy Pop from The Idiot (1977)	4:17
20.	"Modern Love" (Single version)		Let's Dance	3:59
21.	"Blue Jean"		Tonight (1984)	3:10
Total length:				85:45

- When Changesbowie was issued in Rykodisc's AU20 series on CD in 1996, "Fame '90" was replaced by the album version of "Fame". The front insert still listed the track list as containing the "Fame '90 remix". The back insert of the CD correctly listed "Fame" rather than "Fame '90 remix"; however, it omitted the track "Diamond Dogs". The back of the Obi wrap lists all tracks correctly.

== Charts ==
=== Weekly charts ===
Chart (1990)	Peak position
Australian Albums (ARIA)	6
Austrian Albums (Ö3 Austria)	5
Belgian Albums (Ultratop)	2
Canadian Albums (RPM)	30
Dutch Albums (Album Top 100)	6
European Albums (European Top 100 Albums)	4
Finnish Albums (Suomen virallinen lista)	8
French Albums (SNEP)	6
German Albums (Offizielle Top 100)	7
Irish Albums (IFPI)	3
Italian Albums (Musica e dischi)	11
New Zealand Albums (RMNZ)	2
Spanish Albums (AFYVE)	13
Swedish Albums (Sverigetopplistan)	14
Swiss Albums (Schweizer Hitparade)	18
UK Albums (OCC)	1
US Billboard 200	39

Chart (1997)	Peak position
Norwegian Albums (VG-lista)	16

Chart (2016)	Peak position
Portuguese Albums (AFP)	39

=== Year-end charts ===
Chart (1990)	Position
Australian Albums (ARIA)	33
Austrian Albums (Ö3 Austria)	22
Dutch Albums (Album Top 100)	46
German Albums (Offizielle Top 100)	40
New Zealand Albums (RMNZ)	47
UK Albums (OCC)	26

== Certifications ==
Region	Certification	Certified units/sales
Australia (ARIA)	Platinum	70,000^{^}
Canada (Music Canada)	Gold	50,000^{^}
France (SNEP)	Platinum	300,000^{*}
Germany (BVMI)	Gold	250,000^{^}
Netherlands (NVPI)	Gold	50,000^{^}
New Zealand (RMNZ)	Gold	7,500^{^}
Spain (Promusicae)	Gold	50,000^{^}
United Kingdom (BPI)	Platinum	300,000^{^}
United States (RIAA)	Platinum	1,000,000^{^}
^{*} Sales figures based on certification alone.^{^} Shipments figures based on certification alone.
