= Big Brother (David Bowie song) =

1974 song by David Bowie

Song by David Bowie

from the album Diamond Dogs
- Released: 24 May 1974
- Recorded: January–February 1974
- Studio: Olympic, London
- Genre: Art rock, glam rock, blue-eyed soul
- Length: 3:21
- Label: RCA
- Songwriter(s): David Bowie
- Producer(s): David Bowie

"Big Brother" is a song written by David Bowie in 1973 and intended for his never-produced musical based on George Orwell's Nineteen Eighty-Four. In 1974 it was released on the album Diamond Dogs. It segued into the final track on the record, "Chant of the Ever Circling Skeletal Family".

== Background ==
"Big Brother" was recorded on 14-15 January 1974, among the last songs recorded during the Diamond Dogs sessions. Lyrically, the song reflects the ending of Nineteen Eighty-Four, where Winston Smith's brainwashing is complete, and he loves Big Brother. This was described by Bowie biographer David Buckley as "a frightening paean to the Super God", while Nicholas Pegg considered that Bowie was showing how "the glamour of dictatorships is balanced with the banality".

The opening trumpet line, played on a Chamberlin, has been compared to Miles Davis' Sketches of Spain. The melody in the chorus was echoed in Bowie's own "Shining Star (Makin' My Love)" from Never Let Me Down (1987).

== Live versions ==
Bowie performed the song on two separate tours; first a live version (which included "Chant of the Ever Circling Skeletal Family") from the first leg of the Diamond Dogs Tour was released on David Live, and another live recording from the second leg of the same tour was released in 2017 on Cracked Actor (Live Los Angeles '74). "Big Brother" was also performed during Bowie's 1987 Glass Spider Tour, a live version from which appears on the two-CD concert released on the Special Edition of Glass Spider (2007); the performance was not included on the live video release.

== Other releases ==
The song appeared in the Sound + Vision box set in 1989 and was remastered as part of the box set Who Can I Be Now? (1974–1976) (2016).

== Personnel ==
According to Chris O'Leary:

- David Bowie – lead and backing vocals, 12-string acoustic guitar, rhythm guitar, baritone and tenor saxophone, Mellotron, handclaps, tambourine?
- Geoff MacCormack – backing vocals
- Alan Parker – lead guitar
- Herbie Flowers – bass guitar
- Tony Newman – drums
- Tony Visconti – sound effects

Technical

- David Bowie – producer
- Keith Harwood – engineer
