= Diamond Dogs (song) =

1974 single by David Bowie

Single by David Bowie

from the album Diamond Dogs
- B-side: "Holy Holy"
- Released: 14 June 1974
- Recorded: January–February 1974
- Studio: Olympic, London
- Genre: Garage rock; blues rock; proto-punk; glam rock
- Length: 6:02
- Label: RCA
- Songwriter(s): David Bowie
- Producer(s): David Bowie

David Bowie singles chronology
| "Rock 'n' Roll Suicide" (1974) | "Diamond Dogs" (1974) | "1984" (1974) |

"Diamond Dogs" is a 1974 single by the English singer-songwriter David Bowie, the title track of the album of the same name.

The lyric introduces the listener to Bowie's latest persona and his environment; Halloween Jack dwells on top of an abandoned skyscraper ("Manhattan Chase", a.k.a. One Chase Manhattan Plaza) in a post-apocalyptic Manhattan. The guitar sound is heavily influenced by The Rolling Stones, and signalled Bowie moving away from glam rock and closer to a proto-punk Stooges-influenced sound.

The track was considered by many commentators to be an unconventional single, and it only reached number 21 in the United Kingdom. According to NME critics Roy Carr and Charles Shaar Murray, "As a potential hit single, the title track from Diamond Dogs was something of a non-event. Too long, too bleak in vision, too tough to dance to... you know the drill."

Although it was not issued in the US as a single (despite the fact that copies were pressed in the US for shipment to the UK and were commonly imported into the US for sale in shops that sold imports), the song became a central part of Bowie's North American tour in 1974.

The B-side was a version of Bowie's 1971 single "Holy Holy", re-recorded during the Ziggy Stardust sessions the same year.

== Track listing ==
All tracks written by David Bowie.

1. "Diamond Dogs" – 5:56
2. "Holy Holy" – 2:20

In Australia, a 2'58" edit of "Diamond Dogs" was used (RCA 102462) instead of the full-length album version.

== Personnel ==
According to biographer Chris O'Leary:

- David Bowie – vocals, lead and rhythm guitars, tenor and baritone saxophone, producer
- Herbie Flowers – bass
- Mike Garson – piano
- Aynsley Dunbar – drums

== Charts ==
| Chart (1974) | Peak position |
|---|---|
| Australia (ARIA) | 66 |
| Belgium (Ultratop 50 Wallonia) | 46 |
| Finland (Suomen virallinen lista) | 7 |
| France (SNEP) | 186 |
| Ireland (IRMA) | 27 |
| UK Singles (OCC) | 21 |

== Live versions ==
- A live version from the first leg of the 1974 tour was released on David Live. This version was also issued on the Dutch release Rock Concert. A live recording from the second leg of the same tour (previously available on the unofficial album A Portrait in Flesh) was released in 2017 on Cracked Actor (Live Los Angeles '74). A live version from the third leg of the tour, incorporating the chorus of the Rolling Stones' "It's Only Rock 'n Roll (But I Like It)", was released in 2020 on I'm Only Dancing (The Soul Tour 74).
- A live performance recorded on 23 March 1976 was included on Live Nassau Coliseum '76, which was released as part of the 2010 reissues of the Station to Station album, on the 2016 collection Who Can I Be Now? (1974–1976), and as a stand–alone album in 2017.

== Other releases ==
- The song appears on several compilations:
  - Changesonebowie (1976)
  - The Best of Bowie (1980) [note: 4:37 re-edited version]
  - Chameleon (Australia/New Zealand 1979)
  - Changesbowie (1990)
  - The Singles Collection (1993)
  - The Best of 1969/1974 (1997)
  - Best of Bowie (2002)
  - The Platinum Collection (2005/2006)
  - Nothing Has Changed (2014)
- It was released as a picture disc in the RCA Life Time picture disc set.
- The 4:37 edit heard on the 1980 Best of Bowie compilation LP was released on CD in 2004, on the bonus disc of the 30th Anniversary edition of Diamond Dogs (though commentators note dissimilarities).
- The Australian single edit was reissued in 2016 on Re:Call 2, part of the Who Can I Be Now? compilation.

== Cover versions ==
- Beck recorded a cover version of "Diamond Dogs", produced by Timbaland, for the film Moulin Rouge! in 2001. The dancers in the film were also called the Diamond Dogs, as were the dancers on Bowie's 1974 tour.
- Duran Duran – Thank You (Japanese version 1995)
- Gilby Clarke – Swag (2001)
- John Vanderslice - John Vanderslice Plays David Bowie's Diamond Dogs (2015)
