= David Live =

1974 live album by David Bowie

Live album by David Bowie
- Released: 29 October 1974 (UK)
- Recorded: 8–12 July 1974
- Venues: Tower Theater, Upper Darby Township, Pennsylvania, U.S.
- Genres: Glam rock; Philadelphia soul; blue-eyed soul
- Length: 81:06
- Label: RCA Victor
- Producer: Tony Visconti

David Bowie chronology
Diamond Dogs (1974)	David Live (1974)	Young Americans (1975)

Singles from David Live
- 1. "Knock on Wood" Released: 13 September 1974 (UK)

David Live is the first official live album by the English musician David Bowie, originally released through RCA Records in October 1974. The album was recorded in July of that year, on the initial leg of Bowie's Diamond Dogs Tour, at the Tower Theater in Upper Darby Township, Pennsylvania.

The tour was Bowie's most ambitious to date, featuring a giant set designed to evoke "Hunger City", the post-apocalyptic setting for Diamond Dogs, and his largest band, led by Michael Kamen. In addition to this album, the tour was also documented on film in Alan Yentob's Cracked Actor (1975), as well as in the archival live recordings Cracked Actor (Live Los Angeles '74) (2017) and I'm Only Dancing (The Soul Tour 74) (2020). David Live catches Bowie in transition from the "Ziggy Stardust" glam-rock era of his career to the 'plastic soul' of Young Americans. While the cover featured a picture of Bowie during the later leg of the tour in his soul-influenced fashion, the music was recorded during the initial summer leg of the tour, before it was revamped to focus on Bowie's Philadelphia soul material.

The album was a commercial success upon release, reaching number two in the United Kingdom, as well as hitting the top 10 in the United States and Canada. However, it received largely negative critical reviews, with many of the complaints directed at the musical arrangements and Bowie's strained vocal performances. In 2005, the album was re-issued with four additional tracks and a new remix by Tony Visconti. It has also been re-evaluated, with some critics considering the album a valuable document of a transitional period in the artist's career.

== Background and recording ==
David Bowie supported his eighth studio album Diamond Dogs on the Diamond Dogs Tour, whose first leg lasted from 14 June to 20 July 1974. Co-designed and constructed by Chris Langhart, it featured elaborate set-pieces and cost $250,000. Fritz Lang's Metropolis (1927) and Robert Wiene's The Cabinet of Dr. Caligari (1920) influenced the tour's design, primarily due to Bowie's interest in German expressionism. The tour's second leg, from 2 September to 1 December 1974, has been nicknamed 'the Soul Tour', because of the influence of the soul music Bowie had begun recording for Young Americans in August. The shows were altered heavily, and no longer featured elaborate set-pieces, partly because Bowie had tired of the design and wanted to explore the new sound he was creating. Bowie dropped songs from the previous leg, while he added new ones—some from Young Americans.

Capturing the music on tape was itself problematic; most of the backing vocals, as well as the saxophone and the piano solo for "Aladdin Sane", needed to be overdubbed in the studio later because the performers were often off-mike. According to the original album's liner notes: "This Live album was culled from performances on the 14 and 15 July [sic] 1974 at the Tower Theater outside Philadelphia. It is complete and exact. No studio overdubs or re-recording of voices, instruments or audience have been added with the exception of several backing vocals due to loss of theatre mike contact." According to biographer Nicholas Pegg, there was a 'degree of confusion [that] surrounds the dates of the recordings, which are given incorrectly on some reissues: according to Tony Visconti the correct dates are 11 and 12 July 1974'. The Tower Theater concerts also gave rise to a backstage revolt by Bowie's touring band. Having been informed on short notice that the concerts would be professionally recorded for the official release and that Bowie's management intended to pay them only the standard union fee required for a live recording (a mere $70), the band confronted Bowie an hour before the first show and refused to take the stage unless they received $5,000 each.

The record is also notable for including Bowie's first release of "All the Young Dudes", a song originally given to the band Mott the Hoople for their 1972 album of the same name.

For "Space Oddity" (not released until the album's 2005 reissue) Bowie sang using a radio microphone disguised as a telephone whilst being raised and lowered above the stage by a cherry picker crane.

David Live was mixed at Electric Lady Studios in New York City in July, a month before the sessions for Young Americans commenced. According to a studio acetate auction in 2004, a working title was Wham Bam! Thank You Mam! [sic].

== Reception and legacy ==
Professional ratings
Review scores
Source	Rating
AllMusic	2/5 stars
Blender	2/5 stars
Christgau's Record Guide	C−
The Encyclopedia of Popular Music	1/5 stars
MusicHound Rock	3/5 stars
Pitchfork	7.7/10
The Rolling Stone Album Guide	2/5 stars
Select	4/5
Spin Alternative Record Guide	1/10

David Live received primarily negative reviews from music critics on release. Writing for the New Musical Express, Charles Shaar Murray considered David Live to be an example of "outright artifice and self-parody", overall finding it uneven in quality. He nevertheless praised the rendition of "Rock 'n' Roll Suicide" as the finest performance of the song to date. Chris Charlesworth of Melody Maker was critical of Bowie's voice, calling it "hoarse, throaty and often off-key". In Creem, Lester Bangs wrote that without the proper visuals to accompany the music, the live album is a "dismal flatulence". Reviewing for the same magazine in January 1975, Robert A. Hull was more positive, finding it to be better than Diamond Dogs; he considered its major flaw to be the inclusion of too many tracks from that album, wishing he had included more tracks from The Man Who Sold the World and Pin Ups (1973). In The Village Voice, veteran critic Robert Christgau was very negative towards the album, stating "The artiste [is] at his laryngeal nadir, [the album is] mired in bullshit pessimism and arena-rock pandering — and the soul frills just make it worse."

Nevertheless, the album did attract several positive reviews. Robert Hilburn of the Los Angeles Times considered David Live an "essential" release, commending the reinterpretations of the songs and vocal performances. Reporting for the United Press International, Bruce Meyer considered David Live Bowie's finest record since Ziggy Stardust (1972), but noted that the artist's presence as a live act was not fully captured in the music alone. The Cincinnati Enquirer's Jim Knippenberg likewise praised Bowie as a live act, calling the LP "excellent".

Retrospectively, David Live continues to receive mixed reactions. Reviewing for AllMusic, Stephen Thomas Erlewine gave David Live a mixed review. He gave praise to certain tracks, such as "Knock on Wood" and "All the Young Dudes", but overall concluded: "David Live is primarily of interest as a historical document, yet there's enough good material to make it worthwhile for fanatics." In a more positive review, Michael Idov of Pitchfork commended Bowie's vocal performance throughout the album, finding the version of "Rock 'n' Roll Suicide" to contain "arguably the all-time greatest display of Bowie's voice". Compared to Bowie's 1978 live album Stage, Idov described David Live as the "more genial album", preferring the former over the latter. Reviewing the album's 1990 reissue, Darryl Easlea of BBC Music commended the reissue, finding that it does the original album justice through the restored setlists and remastered sound quality. He gave immense praise to "Knock on Wood", "Sweet Thing", "The Jean Genie" and the previously unreleased "Space Oddity". However, he ultimately considered it and Stage "absolutely invaluable" as "complement[s] to the studio albums".

Mick Jagger commented about the album at the time, saying he thought "Knock on Wood" was "awful", stating: "If I got the kind of reviews that he got for that album, I would honestly never record again. Never."

Bowie later commented that "David Live was the final death of Ziggy... And that photo on the cover. My God, it looks like I've just stepped out of the grave. That's actually how I felt. That record should have been called 'David Bowie Is Alive and Well and Living Only in Theory'".

== Commercial performance ==
David Live made No. 2 on the UK charts (the tour had only visited North America), No. 5 in Canada (where the tour had opened) and No. 8 in the US. "Knock on Wood" was released as a single, reaching No. 10 in the UK. A reissue of the album in 2005 finally included a complete song list from the original concerts plus a new mix by Tony Visconti, said to be an improvement over the fidelity of previous releases.

== Reissues ==
This album was first released on CD in 1990 by Rykodisc/EMI, containing the bonus tracks "Time" and "Here Today, Gone Tomorrow", as well as Bowie's introduction to the audience of his band. A new version of the album was released on CD in 2005 by EMI/Virgin, containing two additional bonus tracks: "Panic in Detroit" (this version had previously been released as the B-side to the UK single release of "Knock on Wood", and reissued on the 1982 compilation Rare) and "Space Oddity", a reordering of these and previous bonus tracks into their correct position in the original setlist order, and a new mix by Tony Visconti.

In 2016, the album was included, in two versions, in the Who Can I Be Now? (1974–1976) box set. One version contained the original mix and the same tracks that had appeared on the original vinyl album; the other replicated the 2005 version of the album in a new remastering. The latter was also released separately on CD and vinyl, in 2017.

== Track listing ==
=== Original release ===
All tracks are written by David Bowie, except where noted.

Side one
No.	Title	Length
1.	"1984"	3:21
2.	"Rebel Rebel"	2:42
3.	"Moonage Daydream"	5:10
4.	"Sweet Thing"/"Candidate"/"Sweet Thing (Reprise)"	8:48
Total length:		20:01

Side two
No.	Title	Length
1.	"Changes"	3:36
2.	"Suffragette City"	3:46
3.	"Aladdin Sane (1913-1938-197?)"	4:58
4.	"All the Young Dudes" (made famous by Mott the Hoople)	4:19
5.	"Cracked Actor"	3:29
Total length:		20:08

Side three
No.	Title	Writer(s)	Length
1.	"Rock 'n' Roll with Me"	Bowie, Warren Peace	4:19
2.	"Watch That Man"		4:23
3.	"Knock on Wood" (originally by Eddie Floyd)	Eddie Floyd, Steve Cropper	3:08
4.	"Diamond Dogs"		6:34
Total length:			18:24

Side four
No.	Title	Length
1.	"Big Brother"/"Chant of the Ever-Circling Skeletal Family (Note: "Chant of the Ever-Circling Skeletal Family" is an unlisted track not mentioned on the liner notes of any release.)"	4:11
2.	"The Width of a Circle"	8:14
3.	"The Jean Genie"	5:19
4.	"Rock 'n' Roll Suicide"	4:49
Total length:		22:33 (81:06)

=== 1990 Rykodisc/EMI ===
Disc one
No.	Title	Writer(s)	Length
1.	"1984"		3:20
2.	"Rebel Rebel"		2:40
3.	"Moonage Daydream"		5:10
4.	"Sweet Thing"/"Candidate"/"Sweet Thing (Reprise)"		8:48
5.	"Changes"		3:34
6.	"Suffragette City"		3:45
7.	"Aladdin Sane (1913-1938-197?)"		4:57
8.	"All the Young Dudes" (originally by Mott the Hoople)		4:18
9.	"Cracked Actor"		3:29
10.	"Rock 'n' Roll with Me"	Bowie, Peace (for the music)	4:18
11.	"Watch That Man"		4:55

Disc two
No.	Title	Writer(s)	Length
1.	"Knock on Wood" (originally by Eddie Floyd)	Floyd, Cropper	3:08
2.	"Diamond Dogs"		6:32
3.	"Big Brother"/"Chant of the Ever-Circling Skeletal Family"		4:08
4.	"The Width of a Circle"		8:12
5.	"The Jean Genie"		5:13
6.	"Rock 'n' Roll Suicide"		4:30
7.	"Band Intro" (Bonus track)		0:09
8.	"Here Today, Gone Tomorrow" (originally by Ohio Players)	Leroy Bonner, Joe Harris, Marshall Jones, Ralph Middlebrooks, Dutch Robinson, Clarence Satchell, Gary Webster	3:32
9.	"Time"		5:19

=== 2005 EMI/Virgin ===
Disc one
No.	Title	Writer(s)	Length
1.	"1984"		3:20
2.	"Rebel Rebel"		2:40
3.	"Moonage Daydream"		5:10
4.	"Sweet Thing"/"Candidate"/"Sweet Thing (Reprise)"		8:48
5.	"Changes"		3:34
6.	"Suffragette City"		3:45
7.	"Aladdin Sane"		4:57
8.	"All the Young Dudes"		4:18
9.	"Cracked Actor"		3:29
10.	"Rock 'n' Roll with Me"	Bowie, Peace (for the music)	4:18
11.	"Watch That Man"		4:55

Disc two
No.	Title	Writer(s)	Length
1.	"Knock on Wood" (originally by Eddie Floyd)	Floyd, Cropper	3:08
2.	"Here Today, Gone Tomorrow" (bonus track)	Bonner, Harris, Jones, Middlebrooks, Robinson, Satchell, Webster	3:32
3.	"Space Oddity" (bonus track)		6:27
4.	"Diamond Dogs"		6:32
5.	"Panic in Detroit" (bonus track)		5:41
6.	"Big Brother"/"Chant of the Ever-Circling Skeletal Family"		4:08
7.	"Time" (bonus track)		5:19
8.	"The Width of a Circle"		8:12
9.	"The Jean Genie"		5:13
10.	"Rock 'n' Roll Suicide"		4:47

== Personnel ==
According to the album's liner notes:

- David Bowie – vocals
- Earl Slick – guitar
- Herbie Flowers – bass
- Michael Kamen – electric piano, Moog, oboe, arrangements, musical director
- Tony Newman – drums
- Pablo Rosario – percussion
- David Sanborn – alto saxophone, flute
- Richard Grando – baritone saxophone, flute
- Mike Garson – piano, Mellotron
- Gui Andrisano – backing vocals
- Warren Peace – backing vocals

== Charts ==
Weekly chart performance for David Live
Year	Chart	Peak Position
1974	Australian Albums (Kent Music Report	9
1974	Canada Top Albums/CDs (RPM)	5
1974	Finnish Albums (Suomen virallinen lista)	30
1974	UK Albums (Official Charts)	2
1974	US Billboard Top LPs & Tape	8
1974	Norwegian Albums (VG-lista)	12
1975	Italian Albums (Musica e dischi)	22
2005	Dutch Albums (Album Top 100)	89
2005	French Albums (SNEP)	165
2011	Italian Albums (FIMI)	99
2017	Belgian Albums (Ultratop Flanders)	163
2017	Hungarian Albums (MAHASZ)	28

== Certifications ==
Certifications for David Live
Region	Certification	Certified units/sales
United States (RIAA)	Gold	500,000^{^}
^{^} Shipments figures based on certification alone.
