= Future Legend =

Song by David Bowie

from the album Diamond Dogs
- Released: 24 May 1974
- Recorded: Early 1974
- Studio: Olympic, London
- Genre: Glam rock
- Length: 1:10
- Label: RCA
- Songwriter(s): David Bowie "Bewitched, Bothered and Bewildered" by Richard Rodgers
- Producer(s): David Bowie

"Future Legend" is the opening track of David Bowie's 1974 album Diamond Dogs. Its spoken narrative introduces the album's setting in a "glitter apocalypse".

== Music and lyrics ==
Barely a minute in length, "Future Legend" begins with a distorted howl and features Bowie's spoken-word vision of a post-apocalyptic Manhattan, now renamed Hunger City. He describes "fleas the size of rats" and "rats the size of cats", and compares the humanoid inhabitants to "packs of dogs".

Halfway through the narration, the Richard Rodgers' tune "Bewitched, Bothered and Bewildered" strikes up, the song and its composer appear on the track list of the original vinyl album but this credit is omitted on CD releases (with the exception of the first one made in West Germany for the European market in 1984). "Future Legend" then transitions into the album's title track with the cry, "This ain't rock and roll. This is genocide!"

The narrative has been compared to the writings of William Burroughs, particularly such phrases as "a baying pack of people" in Naked Lunch.

== Other uses ==
A backing tape of the track was played as the lead-in to "Diamond Dogs" at some performances on Bowie's North American tour in 1974.
