= Aladdin Sane (song) =

Song by David Bowie

from the album Aladdin Sane
- Released: 19 April 1973 (Note: There is some debate about the release date. Previously reported as 13 April 1973, in 2018, Bowie's official website stated that new evidence had come to light proving that the official release date was 20 April 1973, but because this was Good Friday (a public holiday in the UK), the album was made available on 19 April. According to Benoît Clerc's book David Bowie All the Songs (2022), the US release date was 13 April and the UK release date was 19 April.)
- Recorded: January 1973
- Studio: Trident, London
- Genre: Art rock, glam rock, avant-garde jazz
- Length: 5:06
- Label: RCA
- Songwriter: David Bowie
- Producers: Ken Scott, David Bowie

"Aladdin Sane (1913–1938–197?)" is a song by the English singer-songwriter David Bowie, the title track from his 1973 album Aladdin Sane. Described by biographer David Buckley as the album's "pivotal" song, it saw Bowie moving into more experimental musical styles following the success of his breakthrough glam rock release The Rise and Fall of Ziggy Stardust and the Spiders from Mars in 1972.

== Title ==
The name is a pun on "A Lad Insane" and it was inspired by Bowie's half-brother Terry, who had been diagnosed as a schizophrenic. An early variation was "Love Aladdin Vein", which Bowie dropped partly because of its drug connotations. The dates in parentheses refer to the years preceding World War I and World War II, with the third unknown date reflecting Bowie’s belief in an impending World War III.

The title has been rendered a number of ways on different releases since 1973. The original vinyl issue of Aladdin Sane listed it as "Aladdin Sane (1913-1938-197?)", followed by "RHMS Ellinis", the name of the ship on which it was written, in keeping with Bowie's practice on the album of indicating the origin of each track. The coda includes a quote from the song "On Broadway", and on the compilation album Changestwobowie (1981) it appeared in the liner notes as "Aladdin Sane (1913-1938-197?)/On Broadway", with additional songwriting credits for the writers of "On Broadway" (Barry Mann, Cynthia Weil and Jerry Leiber and Mike Stoller). On the 1990 Rykodisc CD reissue the track was referred to as simply "Aladdin Sane", but subsequent CD reissues of the album in 1999, 2003 and 2013 restored the "Aladdin Sane (1913-1938-197?)" title.

== Music and lyrics ==
Bowie wrote "Aladdin Sane" in December 1972 as he sailed back to the UK following the first leg of his US Ziggy Stardust Tour. The song was inspired by a book he was reading, Evelyn Waugh's 1930 novel Vile Bodies (filmed in 2003 as Bright Young Things, a phrase that also appears in the song's lyrics). Bowie saw in Waugh's story of "frivolous, decadent and silly" behaviour on the eve of "imminent catastrophe" a reflection of contemporary society, particularly in America. At Bridge School Benefit X in 1996, Bowie played the song acoustically and reflected that it was "about young people, just between the two wars, wanting to go and screw girls and kill foreigners."

The song features a piano solo by Mike Garson, an American keyboardist who had recently joined Bowie's band. Bowie politely rejected Garson's two initial solo attempts (one in a blues style and the other Latin) and asked for something akin to "the avant-garde jazz scene in the 60s". Garson obliged with the performance heard on the album, improvised and recorded in one take. In 1999, he remarked:

I've had more communication in the last 26 years about that one solo than the 11 albums I've done on my own, the six that I've done with another group that I'm co-leader of, hundreds of pieces I've done with other people and the 3,000 pieces of music I've written to date. I don't think there's been a week in those 26 years that have gone by without someone, somewhere, asking me about it!

Garson remembered Bowie's guidance in making the solo come out the way it did:

I had told Bowie about the avant-garde thing. When I was recording the "Aladdin Sane" track for Bowie, it was just two chords, an A and a G chord, and the band was playing very simple English rock and roll. And Bowie said: 'play a solo on this.' I had just met him, so I played a blues solo, but then he said: 'No, that’s not what I want.' And then I played a latin solo. Again, Bowie said: 'No no, that’s not what I want.' He then continued: 'You told me you play that avant-garde music. Play that stuff!' And I said: 'Are you sure? 'Cause you might not be working anymore!'. So I did the solo that everybody knows today, in one take. I always tell people that Bowie is the best producer I ever met, because he lets me do my thing.

Rolling Stone's contemporary review described the music as "hothouse orientalism, jagged, dissonant and daring, yet also wistful and backward-looking". Writing in 1981, NME editors Roy Carr and Charles Shaar Murray considered the song "one of Bowie's early 'European' pieces", and compared Garson's playing to that of American free jazz pianist Cecil Taylor. Reviewing the 30th Anniversary Edition of Aladdin Sane in 2003, Sydney Morning Herald music critic Bernard Zuel noted that the "to-and-fro between art and dramatic pop in the song provides a bridge between Bowie's pre-fame leanings and his mid-'70s decamp to Berlin". Bowie biographer David Buckley has said that at the time of its release "Aladdin Sane" was "the clearest indicator of how Bowie was trying to free himself from the confines of rock".

== "Zion" ==
A track now referred to as "Zion" has also appeared on bootlegs under the titles "Aladdin Vein", "Love Aladdin Vein", "A Lad in Vein", and "A Lad in Vain". Incorporating parts of "Aladdin Sane" and what would become "Sweet Thing (Reprise)" on Diamond Dogs, this instrumental piece was generally thought to have been recorded during the Aladdin Sane sessions at Trident Studios early in 1973. However a recent estimate places it alongside recordings for Pin Ups later that year, as a preview of Bowie's next original work, leading author Nicholas Pegg to suggest that it "perhaps ought to be regarded more as a Diamond Dogs demo than an Aladdin Sane out-take".

== Personnel ==
According to Chris O'Leary:

- David Bowie – lead vocals, 12-string acoustic guitar
- Mick Ronson – lead and rhythm guitar
- Trevor Bolder – bass guitar
- Mick Woodmansey – drums
- Ken Fordham – tenor saxophone
- Mike Garson – piano

Technical

- David Bowie – producer
- Ken Scott – producer, engineer

== Live versions ==
"Aladdin Sane" was debuted live in February 1973, prior to the album’s release, and often played in concert during the later Ziggy Stardust tours and again on the Diamond Dogs tour in 1974. A performance from the first leg of the 1974 tour was released on David Live (1974), the same track also appearing on Rock Concert. A live version from the second leg of the same tour (previously available on the unofficial album A Portrait in Flesh) was released in 2017 on Cracked Actor (Live Los Angeles '74). Bowie revived the song on stage in 1996, again with Garson on piano. In November of that year, he recorded an acoustic version with vocals from bass player Gail Ann Dorsey for the BBC session ChangesNowBowie, which was broadcast on 8 January 1997 and released commercially in 2020. Performances of the song on the Outside Tour in 1996 were duets with Dorsey that included quotations of "On Broadway" and "All Day and All of the Night" by the Kinks.

== Other releases ==
The original song has appeared on several compilations:

- The Best of David Bowie (Japan 1974)
- Chameleon (Australia/New Zealand 1979)
- Changestwobowie (1981)
- The Best of 1969/1974 (1997)

== Cover versions ==
- Toni Basil – Live at the Roxy
- Emergency Broadcast Network – Sampled for "Homicidal Schizophrenic (A Lad Insane)" on Telecommunication Breakdown (1996)
