= 1984 (song) =

1974 song by David Bowie

- US single

Single by David Bowie

from the album Diamond Dogs
- B-side: "Queen Bitch" (US) "Lady Grinning Soul" (Japan)
- Released: July 1974
- Recorded: January 1974
- Studio: Trident, London
- Genre: Funk rock
- Length: 3:27
- Label: RCA
- Songwriter: David Bowie
- Producer: David Bowie

David Bowie singles chronology
"Diamond Dogs" (1974)	"1984" (1974)	"Knock on Wood" (1974)

"1984" is a song by the English singer David Bowie, from his eighth studio album Diamond Dogs (1974), released as a single in the United States and Japan. Written in 1973, it was inspired by George Orwell's Nineteen Eighty-Four (1949) and, like much of its parent album, originally intended for a stage musical based on the novel, which was never produced because permission was refused by Orwell's widow Sonia.

== Music and lyrics ==
The centrepiece of side two of the original vinyl album, in the context of Bowie's adaptation of Orwell's story, "1984" has been interpreted as representing Winston Smith's imprisonment and interrogation by O'Brien. The lyrics also bear some similarities to Bowie's earlier song "All the Madmen", from The Man Who Sold the World ("They'll split your pretty cranium and fill it full of air").

"1984"'s wah-wah guitar sound is often likened to the "Theme from Shaft" (1971) by Isaac Hayes. Played by Alan Parker, it was one of the few instances on the Diamond Dogs album where Bowie himself did not take the lead guitar part. The track's funk/soul influence has been cited as a clear indicator of where Bowie's style was headed on his next album, Young Americans.

== Recording and release ==
"1984" was first recorded during the Aladdin Sane sessions. The song received its public debut, in a medley with "Dodo", known as "1984/Dodo", on the U.S. TV special The 1980 Floor Show (later bootlegged as Dollars in Drag), which was recorded in London on 18–20 October 1973. A studio version of "1984/Dodo" was recorded around that time, but went unreleased until it appeared on the Sound + Vision box set in 1989. This was Bowie's last recording with Mick Ronson, Trevor Bolder and producer Ken Scott at Trident Studios, London.

In addition to the "1984/Dodo" medley, "Dodo" and "1984" were also recorded separately, "Dodo" as a demo in September 1973 and "1984" itself during the later Diamond Dogs sessions that winter. Only "1984" made it onto the Diamond Dogs album, with the separated "Dodo" being released for the first time as a bonus track on the 1990 Rykodisc release of the album.

The final version of "1984" was faster and funkier than the medley and, as described by Bowie encyclopedist Nicholas Pegg, "an obvious single if there ever was one". However, it was released as a single (PB 10026) only in America, Japan and New Zealand, reaching 17 in New Zealand and 96 in the United States (Cash Box). The track generally opened the Diamond Dogs concerts in 1974 but was not performed live after the soul tour in 1975.

== Reception ==
Billboard regarded "1984" as Bowie's "most commercial cut...in a long time." Cash Box said that "the combination and intensity of both words and music make this a true pop delight in classic Bowie form." Record World said that "futuristic phantasmigorical fulfillment of Bowie's sci-fi epic promise is realized in the theme from his Midnight Special TV shot."

== Charts ==
Chart (1974)	Peak position
New Zealand (Listener)	17
US Cash Box Top 100 Singles	96

== Personnel ==
According to Chris O'Leary:

- David Bowie – lead vocals
- Geoff MacCormack – backing vocals
- Alan Parker – lead guitar
- Mike Garson – electric piano, piano
- Herbie Flowers – bass guitar
- Aynsley Dunbar or Tony Newman – drums
- Tony Visconti – string arrangement

Technical

- David Bowie – producer
- Keith Harwood – engineer

== Live versions ==
"1984" was performed regularly during Bowie's 1974 Diamond Dogs Tour; a July 1974 performance of was released on David Live (1974), Bowie's first official live album. Another live version from the second leg of the Diamond Dogs Tour, recorded in September 1974 and previously available only on the unofficial album A Portrait in Flesh, was released in 2017 on Cracked Actor (Live Los Angeles '74). A third live version, recorded during the third leg of the tour in October 1974, was released in 2020 on I'm Only Dancing (The Soul Tour 74). A live in-studio performance recorded in November 1974 is included on the DVD set The Dick Cavett Show: Rock Icons.

== Other releases ==
"1984" was released as a single in the U.S. in July 1974, backed with "Queen Bitch" from Bowie's 1971 album Hunky Dory. The song has appeared on several of Bowie's compilation albums, including Chameleon (Australia/New Zealand 1979), Changestwobowie (1981), Fame and Fashion (1984), and The Best of David Bowie 1974/1979 (1998). "1984/Dodo" was released in the Sound + Vision box set in 1989, and on the bonus disc of the 30th Anniversary Edition of Diamond Dogs in 2004. "Dodo" was released as a bonus track on the 1990 Rykodisc reissue of Diamond Dogs, as well as on the bonus disc of the 30th Anniversary Edition of Diamond Dogs in 2004. Tina Turner covered the song for her 1984 album Private Dancer; that same year, Turner was a guest vocalist on Bowie's cover of "Tonight" for the album of the same name.
