= Suffragette City =

1972 song by David Bowie

- UK single B-side label

Song by David Bowie

from the album The Rise and Fall of Ziggy Stardust and the Spiders from Mars
- A-side: "Starman"
- Released: 28 April 1972 (B-side); 16 June 1972 (album)
- Recorded: 4 February 1972
- Studio: Trident, London
- Genre: Glam rock; proto-punk; hard rock
- Length: 3:25
- Label: RCA
- Songwriter: David Bowie
- Producers: David Bowie; Ken Scott

Official audio
- "Suffragette City" (2012 Remaster) on YouTube

"Suffragette City"

Single by David Bowie

from the album Changesonebowie
- B-side: "Stay"
- Released: 9 July 1976
- Length: 3:25
- Label: RCA

David Bowie singles chronology
"Stay" (1976)	"Suffragette City" (1976)	"Sound and Vision" (1977)

"Suffragette City" is a song by the English singer-songwriter David Bowie. It was originally released in April 1972 as the B-side of the single "Starman" and subsequently appeared on his fifth studio album The Rise and Fall of Ziggy Stardust and the Spiders from Mars (1972). The song was later reissued as a single in 1976, with the US single edit of "Stay" as the B-side, to promote the compilation album Changesonebowie in the UK. Co-produced by Bowie and Ken Scott, it was recorded by Bowie at Trident Studios in London with his backing band the Spiders from Mars, consisting of Mick Ronson, Trevor Bolder and Mick Woodmansey, at a late stage of the album's sessions. The song was originally offered to English band Mott the Hoople, who declined it and recorded Bowie's "All the Young Dudes" instead. It is a glam rock song that is influenced by the music of Little Richard and the Velvet Underground. The lyrics include a reference to Anthony Burgess' novel A Clockwork Orange and the lyric "Oooohh wham bam, thank you, ma'am".

"Suffragette City" received acclaim from music critics, with many praising the guitar work, the band's performance, the false ending, the lyrics and the song's power. It has subsequently been called one of Bowie's greatest songs by multiple publications, including NME. Bowie performed the song frequently during his concert tours and it has appeared on multiple compilation albums. It has been remastered several times, including 2012 for the 40th anniversary of the album; this version was included as part of the 2015 box set Five Years (1969–1973).

== Composition and recording ==
"Suffragette City" was recorded on 4 February 1972 at Trident Studios, London, towards the end of the Ziggy Stardust sessions. Also recorded during this session were "Rock 'n' Roll Suicide" and "Starman". It was co-produced by Bowie and Ken Scott and recorded with Bowie's backing band the Spiders from Mars, consisting of Mick Ronson, Trevor Bolder and Mick Woodmansey. Before recording it himself, Bowie offered "Suffragette City" to Mott the Hoople, an English band he greatly admired, provided they forgo their plan to break up. The group refused but recorded Bowie's "All the Young Dudes" instead.

The track is a glam rock, proto-punk, and hard rock song. The piano riff was heavily influenced by the music of Little Richard. The song features one of Bowie's earliest uses of the ARP synthesiser, which would later become the backbone of his Berlin Trilogy. The instrument was used to mimic a saxophone, which underscores the guitar throughout the track. Bowie composed the riff, while Scott used the ARP located at Trident to find the right sound and Ronson played the notes. The backing vocals move from the left channel in the first verse to the right in the second.

According to biographer Peter Doggett, while other rock songs such as the Rolling Stones' "Brown Sugar" and the Kinks' "All Day and All of the Night" use a standard three-chord structure that is spaced "two and three semitones apart" (such as E-G-A or A-G-C), "Suffragette City" uses tighter, two-semitone gaps (F-G-A), which "leaves the ear to expect a softer A minor as the root of the song, only for a decisive A major chord to appear instead". Doggett believes that this decision gives the track its "unrelenting power". The track's acoustic guitar instrumentation was played by Bowie, but is mostly buried in the mix under Ronson's electric guitar. After a false ending, Bowie cries "wham bam, thank you, ma'am!" before the band gets back into the groove, finishing with Bowie shrieking "Suffragette!"

According to Doggett, before "Suffragette City", the only popular song to contain "suffragette" in its title was "Sister Suffragette", from the 1964 film Mary Poppins. He argues the film's song has more to do with women's liberation than "Suffragette City" does. "Suffragette City" includes the lyric "Ah droogie, don't crash here", a direct reference to the Anthony Burgess' novel A Clockwork Orange (1962); Stanley Kubrick's film adaptation was a major influence on Ziggy Stardust's cultural grab-bag, dictating both costumes and pre-show music on tour. The song was written only a few months after the film's release in 1971. The famous, "sexually charged" hook "wham bam, thank you, ma'am!" previously appeared as the title of a song on jazz bassist Charles Mingus's 1961 album Oh Yeah, as well as a 1967 song by the Small Faces. Bowie also uses the "hey man!" backing vocals in the same style as "white light!" from the Velvet Underground's 1968 song "White Light/White Heat", a line from the 1970 song "I Found Out" by John Lennon, a Marc Bolan-esque boogie, "some Flamin' Groovies speed, some Jerry Lee Lewis swagger", and a "dose of hard rock theatrics" to finish it out.

Bowie's handwritten lyrics for the song were included in the David Bowie Is travelling exhibit from 2013 to 2018 and were put up for auction by the owner, who had been gifted the lyrics by Bowie, in late 2023.

== Release and reception ==
"Suffragette City" was originally released on 28 April 1972 by RCA Records as the B-side of Bowie's single "Starman" (as RCA 2199). It was subsequently released as the 10th and penultimate track on his fifth studio album The Rise and Fall of Ziggy Stardust and the Spiders from Mars, on 16 June of that year. RCA reissued the track as the A-side of a single (RCA 2726) on 9 July 1976, to promote the compilation album Changesonebowie in the UK, with the US single edit of the Station to Station track "Stay" as the B-side. The single failed to chart.

Since its release, "Suffragette City" has received critical acclaim, with many writers praising the guitar work. In a review of Ziggy Stardust on its release, Richard Cromelin of Rolling Stone called "Suffragette City" Bowie's "supreme moment as a rock & roller". Noting the Velvet Underground influence, he praised the guitar work in the second half and the false ending, writing that the lyric "Oooohh Wham Bam Thank you Ma'am!" brings you back into it and would make you want to do somersaults. Cromlin concluded by saying that there's only one thing left for the Star, quoting the lyric "There's only room for one and here she comes, here she comes".

Stephen Thomas Erlewine of AllMusic praised Ronson's guitar work, writing, "[Ronson] plays with a maverick flair that invigorates rockers like 'Suffragette City', 'Moonage Daydream' and 'Hang On to Yourself'". Ned Raggett, also of AllMusic, noted the influence of Lou Reed and the Velvet Underground, which was previously seen on the Hunky Dory track "Queen Bitch", but found an overall better result in "Suffragette City". Raggett similarly praised Ronson's guitar work, acknowledging it as both a glam trademark and rock trademark. He further complimented the keyboards and piano, saying they add to song's power and drive. Of the lyrics, Raggett said that some seem like "bad ideas" but that the false ending and famous hook make up for it. Ian Fortnam of Louder, in a review ranking every song on The Rise and Fall of Ziggy Stardust and the Spiders from Mars from worst to best, placed "Suffragette City" at number five, calling it "Ziggy's most reconstructed rocker". Also praising the false ending and famous hook, he ends his review by describing the track as "glam rock in excelsis".

Jordan Blum, writing for PopMatters, described "Suffragette City" and "Ziggy Stardust" as the album's standout tracks that are "still endlessly addicting and pleasantly infectious" 40 years later. He adds that both songs have "archetypal" guitar riffs that, together with the instrumentation and dynamics, make for phenomenal recordings. Blum concluded his review praising this track's hook, chorus and horns, while acknowledging it as "one of the best anthemic tracks ever made". In 2018, the writers of NME listed "Suffragette City" as Bowie's 14th greatest song. In 2015, Ultimate Classic Rock placed the track on their list of the top 200 songs of the 1970s, writing, "this song underscored Bowie's broad interests – he pulled in references from Charles Mingus and A Clockwork Orange – even as it showcased his willingness to experiment with things like the ARP synth".

== Live versions and subsequent releases ==
On 16 May 1972, Bowie recorded "Suffragette City" for the BBC radio programme Sounds of the 70s, presented by John Peel; the session was broadcast one week later. In 2000, this recording was released on the compilation album Bowie at the Beeb. Pegg called the performance "excellent", praising Ronson's "sharp" guitar work and the boogie-woogie piano-playing from Nicky Graham. The song was frequently performed by Bowie during concert tours throughout his career. Performances from the Ziggy Stardust Tour (1972–1973) have appeared on the live albums Live Santa Monica '72 (2008) and Ziggy Stardust: The Motion Picture (1983), the final concert of the tour at which Bowie unexpectedly announced it as "the last show we'll ever do". Performances from the 1974 Diamond Dogs Tour have appeared on David Live (1974), Cracked Actor (Live Los Angeles '74) (2017), and I'm Only Dancing (The Soul Tour 74) (2020). A performance from the 1976 Isolar Tour was released on Live Nassau Coliseum '76 (2017), while performances from the 1978 Isolar II Tour were included on the 2017 edition of Bowie's live album Stage and Welcome to the Blackout (2018).

Since its release, "Suffragette City" has appeared on numerous compilation albums, including Changesonebowie (1976), Changesbowie (1990), The Best of David Bowie 1969/1974 (1997), and Best of Bowie (2002). The song, along with the entire Ziggy Stardust album, has been remastered multiple times, including in 1990 by Rykodisc, and 2012 for its 40th anniversary. The 2012 remaster and a 2003 remix, by producer Ken Scott, were included as part of the box set Five Years (1969–1973) in 2015.

== Track listing ==
All tracks written by David Bowie.

1972 B-side single

1. "Starman" – 4:10
2. "Suffragette City" – 3:25

1976 A-side single

1. "Suffragette City" – 3:25
2. "Stay" – 3:21

== Personnel ==
Personnel per Cann and O'Leary:

- David Bowie – vocals, twelve-string acoustic guitar, producer
- Mick Ronson – backing vocals, electric guitar, piano, ARP 2600 synthesiser
- Trevor Bolder – bass guitar
- Mick Woodmansey – drums
- Ken Scott – producer

== Certifications ==
Certifications for Suffragette City
Region	Certification	Certified units/sales
United Kingdom (BPI) 2005 release	Silver	200,000^{‡}
^{‡} Sales+streaming figures based on certification alone.
