= Rock 'n' Roll Suicide =

Song by David Bowie

Single by David Bowie

from the album The Rise and Fall of Ziggy Stardust and the Spiders from Mars
- B-side: "Quicksand"
- Released: 11 April 1974
- Recorded: 4 February 1972
- Studio: Trident, London
- Genre: Art rock; glam rock
- Length: 2:57
- Label: RCA
- Songwriter: David Bowie
- Producers: David Bowie; Ken Scott

David Bowie singles chronology
| "Rebel Rebel" (1974) | "Rock 'n' Roll Suicide" (1974) | "Diamond Dogs" (1974) |

Official audio
- "Rock 'n' Roll Suicide" (2012 Remaster) on YouTube

"Rock 'n' Roll Suicide" is a song by the English singer-songwriter David Bowie, originally released as the closing track on the album The Rise and Fall of Ziggy Stardust and the Spiders from Mars on 16 June 1972. Co-produced by Ken Scott, Bowie recorded it with his backing band the Spiders from Mars – comprising Mick Ronson, Trevor Bolder and Mick Woodmansey. It detailed Ziggy's final collapse like an old, washed-up rock star and, as such, was also the closing number of the Ziggy Stardust live show. In April 1974 RCA issued it as a single.

== Music and lyrics ==
Bowie saw the song in terms of the French chanson tradition, while biographer David Buckley has described both "Rock 'n' Roll Suicide" and the album's opening track "Five Years" as "more like avant-garde show songs than actual rock songs". Critic Stephen Thomas Erlewine similarly found it to have "a grand sense of staged drama previously unheard of in rock & roll".

Although Bowie has suggested Baudelaire as his source, the lyrics "Time takes a cigarette..." are somewhat similar to the poem "Chants Andalous" by Manuel Machado: "Life is a cigarette / Cinder, ash and fire / Some smoke it in a hurry / Others savour it". The exhortation "Oh no, love, you're not alone" references the Jacques Brel song "You're Not Alone" ("Jef") that appeared in the musical Jacques Brel is Alive and Well and Living in Paris. Bowie performed Brel's "My Death" during some Ziggy Stardust live shows, and performed "Amsterdam" live on the BBC.

In 2003 Bowie described the James Brown songs "Try Me" and "Lost Someone" as "loose inspiration" for the song.

Bowie's handwritten lyrics for the song were included in the David Bowie Is travelling exhibit from 2013 to 2018, and were put up for auction by the owner, who had been gifted the lyrics by Bowie, in late 2023.

== Release and aftermath ==
"Rock 'n' Roll Suicide", recorded on 4 February 1972, was one of the last songs recorded for Ziggy Stardust, along with "Suffragette City" and "Starman" which was soon after issued as a single. As the final song on the album and climax to the Ziggy Stardust live shows throughout 1972–73, it soon became a slogan, appearing on many fans' jackets.

In April 1974 RCA, impatient for new material and having already rush-released "Rebel Rebel" from the Diamond Dogs sessions, arbitrarily picked the song for single release. Two years old, and already in the possession of most Bowie fans through Ziggy Stardust, its release has been labelled simply a "dosh-catching exercise". It stalled at No. 22 in the UK charts – Bowie's first RCA single to miss the British Top 20 since "Changes" in January 1972.

Bob Dylan played the song on the "Death and Taxes" episode of Season 1 of his Theme Time Radio Hour show in 2007. Afterwards Dylan recalled how Bowie "told everyone he was going to retire after the Ziggy Stardust Tour" then added, "I remember that. I told him not to do it".

== Live versions ==
Bowie played the song on the BBC show Sounds of the 70s with Bob Harris on 23 May 1972. This was broadcast on 19 June 1972 and in 2000 released on the album Bowie at the Beeb. A live version recorded during the Ziggy Stardust Tour in Santa Monica Civic Auditorium on 20 October 1972 was released on Santa Monica '72 and Live Santa Monica '72. The version played at the final Ziggy Stardust concert at the Hammersmith Odeon, London, on 3 July 1973 was released on Ziggy Stardust – The Motion Picture. Before beginning the song, Bowie announced: "This is the last show we'll ever do." This was later understood as the retiring of Ziggy Stardust. This version also appeared in the Sound + Vision boxed set. In 1974, Bowie recorded a blue-eyed soul version of the song for his live album David Live. Another live recording, from the second leg of the same tour (previously available on the unofficial album A Portrait in Flesh), was released in 2017 on Cracked Actor (Live Los Angeles '74). A live version from the third leg of the tour was released in 2020 on I'm Only Dancing (The Soul Tour 74). Bowie performed the song for the final times during his 1990 Sound+Vision Tour, retiring it from his live repertoire at the conclusion of the tour.

== Other releases ==
"Rock 'n' Roll Suicide" was released as a picture disc in the RCA Life Time picture disc set, and has appeared on a variety of compilation albums, including The Best of David Bowie (Japan 1974), The Best of Bowie (1980), The Singles Collection (1993), The Best of David Bowie 1969/1974 (1997), and The Platinum Collection (2006).

== Track listing ==
All tracks written by David Bowie.

1. "Rock 'n' Roll Suicide" – 2:57
2. "Quicksand" – 5:03

== Personnel ==
According to Chris O'Leary:

- David Bowie – lead vocal, 12-string acoustic guitar
- Mick Ronson – lead and rhythm guitars, ARP synthesiser, backing vocal, string arrangement
- Trevor Bolder – bass guitar
- Mick Woodmansey – drums
- Unknown musicians – two trumpets, two trombones, two tenor saxophones, baritone saxophone, eight violins, four violas, two cellos, two double basses

Technical

- Ken Scott – producer
- David Bowie – producer

== Charts ==
| Chart (1974) | Peak position |
|---|---|
| Belgium (Ultratop 50 Wallonia) | 39 |
| French Singles Chart | 30 |
| Ireland (IRMA) | 12 |
| UK Singles (OCC) | 22 |
