= Sweet Thing (David Bowie song) =

"Sweet Thing/Candidate/Sweet Thing (Reprise)"

Song by David Bowie

from the album Diamond Dogs
- Released: 24 May 1974
- Recorded: January 1974
- Studio: Olympic, London
- Genre: Glam rock; art rock
- Length: 8:50 "Sweet Thing" – 3:38 "Candidate" – 2:39 "Sweet Thing" (Reprise) – 2:31
- Label: RCA
- Songwriter: David Bowie
- Producer: David Bowie

"Sweet Thing" or "Sweet Thing/Candidate/Sweet Thing (Reprise)" is a suite of songs written by David Bowie for the album Diamond Dogs. Recorded in January 1974, the piece comprises the songs "Sweet Thing" and "Candidate" and a one-verse reprise of "Sweet Thing."

In the opening line, "Sweet Thing" contains the lowest note Bowie had recorded in a studio album (C2) until "I Took a Trip on a Gemini Spacecraft" for the album Heathen (2002), where he growled the word "Well" (G1) towards the end of the song.

Bowie recorded a track with the same title, "Candidate" – but no musical similarity to the Diamond Dogs song "Candidate" and only a few words of lyrics in common – during the first several days of January 1974. It was unavailable until 1990 when it was released as a bonus track on the Rykodisc reissue of Diamond Dogs; it also appeared on the bonus disc of the 30th Anniversary Edition of Diamond Dogs in 2004.

== "Tragic Moments/Zion/Aladdin Vein" ==
A track now referred to as "Zion" has also appeared on bootlegs under the titles "Aladdin Vein", "Love Aladdin Vein", "A Lad in Vein", and "A Lad in Vain". Incorporating parts reminiscent of "Aladdin Sane" and what would become "Sweet Thing (Reprise)" on Diamond Dogs, this instrumental piece was generally thought to have been recorded during the Aladdin Sane sessions at Trident Studios early in 1973. However a recent estimate places it alongside recordings for Pin Ups later that year, as a preview of Bowie's next original work, leading author Nicholas Pegg to suggest that it "perhaps ought to be regarded more as a Diamond Dogs demo than an Aladdin Sane out-take". A 1973 article about Bowie recording Pinups in France accurately describes the song, which seems to confirm Pegg's theory:

David asks engineer Andy to run up a quick mix of the next project. Now this is really the one - the next album of Bowie's own original material. "There are no vocals on it yet - just my la-la-la-ing. Its going to be a musical in one act called 'Tragic Moments' probably running straight through two sides. We listen to perhaps seven minutes of music. I am confused. The contrast between 'Tragic Moments' and Pinups could not be greater. The former is a highly arranged, subtly shifting music with just a touch of vaudeville: Mike Garson's piano flashes through like quicksilver. Perhaps the closest approximation to what has gone before would be the title track of Aladdin Sane.

== Personnel ==
According to Chris O'Leary:

- David Bowie – lead and backing vocals, 12-string acoustic guitar, electric guitar, baritone and tenor saxophone, Mellotron, Moog synthesizer
- Mike Garson – piano
- Herbie Flowers – bass
- Tony Newman – drums, tambourine

Technical

- David Bowie – producer
- Keith Harwood – engineer

== Live versions ==
A live version of "Sweet Thing/Candidate/Sweet Thing (Reprise)" from the first leg of the Diamond Dogs Tour was released on David Live. A live recording from the second leg of the same tour (previously available on the unofficial album A Portrait in Flesh) was released in 2017 on Cracked Actor (Live Los Angeles '74).

In one live version in the first line, Bowie sings a step higher than C2, and a little more clearly. Some skeptics have accused Bowie of "studio tinkering" to enhance his range, but this is proof that he was capable of singing a C2.
