= Ava Cherry =

American singer and model (born 1953)

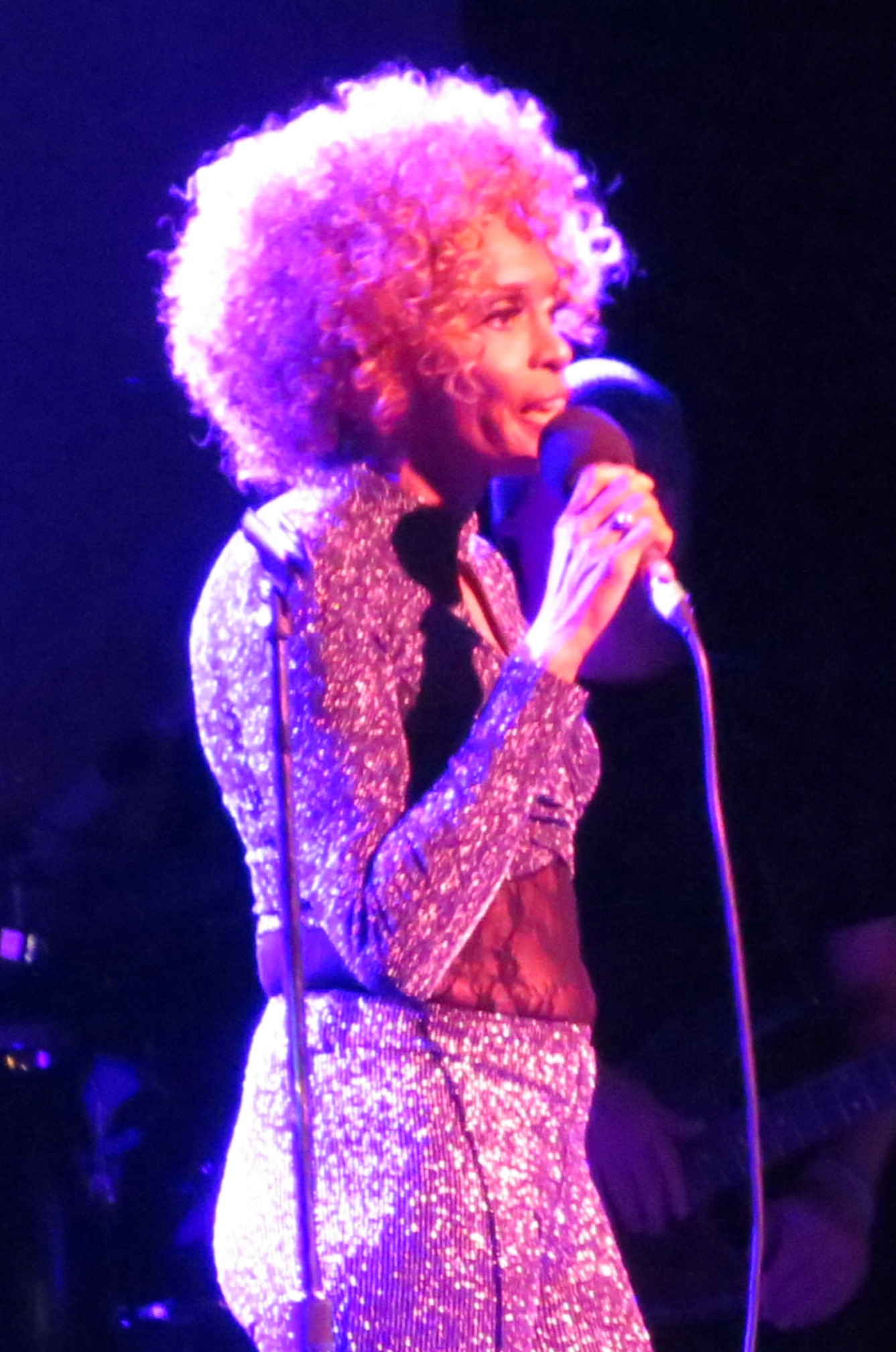
- Cherry at Metro Chicago, 2016

Background information
- Also known as: Black Barbarella
- Born: 1953 (age 72–73); Woodlawn, Chicago, U.S.
- Origin: New York, New York
- Genres: R&B, disco, post-disco, dance-pop, new wave
- Occupations: Singer, model
- Years active: 1972–present
- Labels: RSO, Capitol
- Formerly of: David Bowie, Luther Vandross
- Website: avacherryofficial.com

Signature
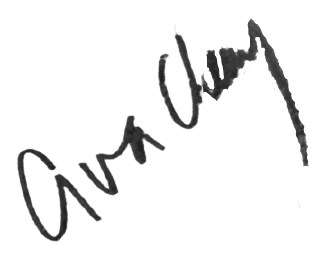

Ava Cherry (born 1953) is an American singer and model. She collaborated with English musician David Bowie between 1972 and 1975; the two met in New York City when she was a nightclub waitress and Bowie was touring for The Rise and Fall of Ziggy Stardust and the Spiders from Mars. Afterwards, they began a period of personal and artistic collaboration that heavily influenced the Young Americans "blue-eyed soul" era. Following this, she struck out as a solo singer and backing artist for musicians such as Luther Vandross and Chaka Khan.

Growing up in Chicago with significant exposure to the local African-American music culture, Cherry became an influence in the works of a number of pre-eminent artists, as well as a respected musician in her own right. Cherry's influence on Young Americans through her connections to major soul music institutions such as Sigma Sound Studios and the Apollo Theater has proven a particularly noted part of her legacy, as has her contemporaneous work with proto-new wave band the Astronettes.

Cherry's solo career has been long-running, with her first album Ripe!!! released in 1980. Her solo work, known for its disco influence, has received a mostly positive critical reception but a lack of commercial success: factors blamed for this critical and commercial disconnect include racial discrimination within the music industry and backlash against her predominant genres.

In January 2022 she released her autobiography All That Glitters: The Ava Cherry Story.

== Early life ==
Cherry was born in 1953 to an African-American family in Woodlawn, a working-class neighbourhood on the south side of Chicago. Her father was a postal worker and trumpet player who worked long hours, "from four o'clock in the morning [until] nine o'clock at night", and she rarely saw him; her mother worked in the administration department for Playboy Enterprises. Both parents' careers left deep imprints on her; she was raised to appreciate music by her father and lived for a period in the Playboy Mansion as a bunny. Cherry was introduced to Hugh Hefner by her friends, and was underage at the time she lived in the mansion. She attended Academy of Our Lady High School and graduated in the early 1970s. (Note: Cherry's precise graduation date is unclear. She quotes graduating in 1973 in the cited article, which is impossible by the timeline of other events.) As a teenager, she sang in a girl group influenced by the Supremes and was a regular attendee at the Regal Theater in Chicago, a venue frequently attended by black music fans.

Cherry first aspired to be a model after graduating high school, putting together a book of headshots and finding work with several agencies. She disliked her unusual last name, but was told by modelling agencies it was an asset to her career. Cherry later moved to New York City for her career, but it failed to prosper, and she found work as a cocktail waitress to pay the bills.

== Relationship with David Bowie ==
Cherry first heard about David Bowie through her agent, who was an early fan and gave her a copy of The Rise and Fall of Ziggy Stardust and the Spiders from Mars. She was captivated by the record, which she played "about a hundred times", and by Bowie's aesthetic sensibility. At the time, Cherry was a waitress at the Genesis nightclub and a close friend of Stevie Wonder's then-girlfriend, who knew Bowie; when she invited Wonder to host an afterparty at Genesis, Bowie attended. When the two first met, he was attracted by her close-cropped blonde hair and asked if she was a singer, inviting her on the spot to sing backup on a planned tour of Japan.

Their relationship quickly turned personal as well as professional. Shortly after they began dating, Cherry met Bowie's wife Angie Bowie, and was shocked to learn he was married until Bowie clarified they were in an open marriage. Cherry and Angie Bowie initially became friends, but ultimately became mutually jealous. Anticipating the Japan tour, Cherry quit her job and sold her apartment, only for the tour to be cancelled. Not to be dissuaded, she went to Europe to search for Bowie.

Travelling Europe, Cherry attracted the attention of some modelling agencies due to her striking and defining visual aesthetic. Designers treated her as "a goddess from outer space" as she made the rounds through the major fashion capitals of Paris, London, and Milan, and she was featured in Vogue and Elle. After a year, Cherry found Bowie working on the album Pin Ups near Paris. They spent a week in the Château d'Hérouville to record the album, which she described as "one of the most beautiful times in my life", and lived together in Paris for eight months.

Bowie hoped to steer Cherry's burgeoning career, saying she could be the "next Josephine Baker" and hoping to sign her to MainMan, run by his manager Tony Defries. He founded a soul-influenced trio called The Astronettes, featuring Cherry, long-time collaborator Warren Peace, and Jason Guess, and recorded and produced their tracks in London through late 1973 and early 1974. The Astronettes project was quickly shelved and the material was not released until the 1990s; however, Bowie kept the trio as his backing singers for the Diamond Dogs era. The Astronettes received mixed reviews, with some describing it as "sketchwork" only valuable as a curiosity, while others admired it for a "new wave before the term existed" sensibility.

Cherry's major influence on Bowie was in Young Americans, his ninth studio album. The heavily soul-influenced work drew on Bowie's interest in black music, and the backing trio of Cherry, Robin Clark (wife of guitarist Carlos Alomar), and a then-unknown Luther Vandross impacted the album's sound. Cherry introduced him to the Apollo Theater, where he poached Alomar and Vandross from the house band; Bowie and Alomar would go on to write some of the album's most successful songs, while Vandross would break out as a celebrity in his own right. She also introduced him to the Sigma Sound Studios, synonymous with Philadelphia soul, where the album was recorded. Cherry was later quoted as saying that it was her influence on and encouragement of Bowie that inspired him to perform black music in the first place. She was a standout member of the Young Americans backing band, attracting the approval of critic Lester Bangs in Creem.

The precise nature of Bowie and Cherry's relationship throughout this era is disputed; Tony Visconti recalled them as lacking any apparent romantic bond, and Bowie as mostly interested in having a managerial role over her career. Angie Bowie was unfamiliar with the extent of their relationship and reportedly almost jumped out of a window when she learned how close they were. The personal difficulty between Cherry and Angie Bowie required the former to keep a low profile in the latter's presence, even as Cherry and Bowie carried on a relationship in New York. Their relationship was also marked by double standards, since Cherry was expected to remain faithful while Bowie had several other partners.

The early to mid-1970s was a chaotic period in Bowie's career, marked by increasing fame and drug abuse. When meeting Cherry's parents, he shocked them by taking out a vial of cocaine at the dinner table. Bowie's drug-based decline came as a particular shock to Cherry, as he did very few drugs when they first met. Their relationship was serious, with Bowie reportedly considering divorcing Angie Bowie to marry Cherry, but handicapped by Bowie's own personal and financial issues. He grew increasingly paranoid, placing a strain on their relationship. Bowie and Defries had significant financial conflicts throughout the period, which culminated in the discovery that the singer had millions of dollars less than he believed; the stress of the financial shock caused him to spontaneously cut ties with multiple people, including Cherry, and drop her from the upcoming Isolar Tour. She said he wrote the songs "Golden Years" and "Stay" from Station to Station about her, although exactly whom the songs were written for is disputed by Bowie biographers.

== Career ==
=== The Astronettes and GO ===
Bowie arranged Cherry and two other collaborators into a backing group called The Astronettes and recorded an album with them; however, the album would not be released until 1995 as People From Bad Homes. The album was released without the approval of either Cherry or Bowie, and Cherry was particularly upset that the unfinished demo tracks were released to the public. People From Bad Homes was regarded by some reviewers, notably Chris O'Leary of Pushing Ahead of the Dame and the Bowie chronologies Rebel Rebel and Ashes to Ashes, as a curiosity with little value except to chronicle the history of later Bowie songs, such as "Scream Like a Baby", a reworking of Cherry's "I Am a Laser". However, more positive reviews recognized the album for its proto-new wave tendencies. In 2008, the same recordings were re-released as The Astronettes Sessions.

After the demise of her relationship with Bowie, Cherry joined progressive jazz supergroup GO. The group was a collaboration with Steve Winwood, former Santana drummer Michael Shrieve, and Stomu Yamashta.

=== Solo career ===
After GO, Cherry returned to Chicago to embark on a solo career. Her first solo album was Ripe!!!, released by RSO Records in 1980 (Note: Specifically September 4, 1980, though it was originally planned for January.) and produced by Curtis Mayfield. Ripe!!! was originally intended to be produced by Gil Askey for Curtom Records, but he was uncomfortable with her work with Bowie. The album made a minor impact on the Billboard Black Albums Chart, but was held back by being a disco album released at the height of the anti-disco backlash. Two singles were released, "Love Is Good News" and "I Just Can't Shake This Feeling". The minor success of the album combined with Cherry's history was enough for her to sign a deal with Capitol Records shortly after.

Cherry's second album Streetcar Named Desire was released by Capitol Records in 1982. It was produced by Bob Esty, who had worked with Donna Summer, Barbra Streisand, and Cher. Streetcar Named Desire was commercially unsuccessful, as were the two singles spawned off it, "Streetcar Named Desire" and "Love To Be Touched". Its lack of success was ascribed in part to racial stereotypes in the music industry; pop radio stations reportedly stopped playing the album after discovering Cherry was a black artist making 'white' music. Contemporary critical reception was positive, describing the album as "electric, heart-pumping funk" and drawing connections to Grace Jones and Debbie Harry.

Picture Me, Cherry's third studio album, was released in 1987. It was her most successful solo attempt, producing two Top 40 dance hit singles, but fell below the label's commercial expectations. The continued disco influence of the album was labelled as a factor in Cherry's failure to break into mainstream pop music. It was, however, successful enough for Cherry to be heralded as one of a number of women changing the face of contemporary pop. Picture Me received mixed reviews, being described as "slick and sexy synth pop", but also as a lean album of overplayed "skimpy grooves".

Cherry would not release another solo record until the EP Spend the Night in 1997, which was most known for its cover of "Forget Me Nots" by Patrice Rushen. Spend the Night was released by J-Bird Records, one of the first record labels to distribute primarily via the Internet. After Spend the Night, Cherry self-distributed a number of singles in the early 2010s. In 2019 she signed to the independent label Wake Up! Music, through which she released a cover of Bowie's "Let's Dance" and the nu-disco single "Testify Love".

=== Backup singer ===
Throughout the 1980s and 1990s, Cherry also worked as a backup singer to R&B musician Luther Vandross. The pair had met many years earlier as backup singers to Bowie, and they built a close relationship, with Cherry referring to him as like a brother. As Vandross' friend and backup, she played a unique role in his stage shows; her glamour-fuelled aesthetic sensibility frequently outshone his, with stage shows built around her and other backup singers rather than the nominal main attraction. The dresses Cherry wore on stage frequently cost more than his own outfits. Vandross' focus on Cherry and Lisa Fischer as a core part of his stage show caused problems for other backup singers, who were required to sink into the background and not outshine them, and treated harshly if they were thought to catch too much attention. Cherry's place in Vandross' stage show has been analyzed for its significance and the implications for Vandross, a flamboyant figure with extensive speculation about his private life and sexual orientation.

Cherry has also sung backup for Chaka Khan and Robert Palmer. In 2013 she appeared in 20 Feet from Stardom, a documentary about backup singers.

== Discography ==
=== Albums and EPs ===
- Ripe!!! (1980, RSO Records)
- Streetcar Named Desire (1982, Capitol Records)
- Picture Me (1987, Capitol Records)
- People From Bad Homes (1995) as Ava Cherry & The Astronettes (Note: Released by Griffin Music in the United States and Golden Years in the United Kingdom.)
- Spend the Night (1997, J-Bird Records)
- The Astronettes Sessions as The Astronettes (2008, Black Barbarella Records)

== Sources ==
- Buckley, David (2005) [1999]. Strange Fascination – David Bowie: The Definitive Story. London: Virgin Books. ISBN 978-0-7535-1002-5.
- Pegg, Nicholas (2016). The Complete David Bowie (Revised and Updated ed.). London: Titan Books. ISBN 978-1-78565-365-0.
- Sandford, Christopher (1997) [1996]. Bowie: Loving the Alien. London: Da Capo Press. ISBN 978-0-306-80854-8.
