= Diamond Dogs =

1974 studio album by David Bowie

Studio album by David Bowie
- Released: 24 May 1974
- Recorded: January–February 1974
- Studios: Trident, London; Olympic, London; Ludolph, Nederhorst den Berg, Netherlands
- Genres: Glam rock; art rock; proto-punk; soul
- Length: 38:25
- Label: RCA Victor
- Producer: David Bowie

David Bowie chronology
Pin Ups (1973)	Diamond Dogs (1974)	David Live (1974)

Singles from Diamond Dogs
- 1. "Rebel Rebel" Released: 15 February 1974; 2. "Diamond Dogs" Released: 14 June 1974; 3. "1984" Released: July 1974 (US and Japan only)

Diamond Dogs is the eighth studio album by the English musician David Bowie, released on 24 May 1974 through RCA Records. Bowie produced the album and recorded it in early 1974 in London and the Netherlands, following the disbanding of his backing band the Spiders from Mars and the departure of the producer Ken Scott. Bowie played lead guitar on the record in the absence of Mick Ronson. Diamond Dogs featured the return of Tony Visconti, who had not worked with Bowie for four years; the two collaborated for the rest of the decade. Musically, it was Bowie's final album in the glam rock genre, though some songs were influenced by funk and soul music, which Bowie embraced on his next album, Young Americans (1975).

Conceived during a period of uncertainty over where his career was headed, Diamond Dogs is the result of multiple projects Bowie envisaged at the time: a scrapped musical based on Ziggy Stardust (1972); an adaptation of George Orwell's novel Nineteen Eighty-Four (1949); and an urban apocalyptic scenario based on the writings of William S. Burroughs. The title track introduces a new persona named Halloween Jack. The Belgian artist Guy Peellaert painted the controversial cover artwork depicting Bowie as a half-man, half-dog hybrid, based on photos taken by the photographer Terry O'Neill.

Preceded by the lead single "Rebel Rebel", Diamond Dogs was a commercial success, peaking at number one in the UK and number five in the US. It has received mixed reviews since its release, many criticising its lack of cohesion; Bowie's biographers consider it one of his best works and, in 2013, NME ranked it one of the greatest albums of all time. Bowie supported the album on the Diamond Dogs Tour, which featured elaborate and expensive set-pieces. Retrospectively, Diamond Dogs has been cited as an influence on the punk revolution in the years following its release. It has been reissued several times and was remastered in 2016 for the Who Can I Be Now? (1974–1976) box set.

== Background ==
[Bowie and I] had done four albums together and we'd probably both reached that point where we needed to work with other people to learn.

— Ken Scott on parting with Bowie

David Bowie released his seventh studio album Pin Ups in the summer of 1973. At the time, he was unsure of where to take his career. Not wanting Ziggy Stardust to define him, he disbanded his backing band the Spiders from Mars and parted ways with producer Ken Scott. According to biographer David Buckley, Scott's departure marked an end to Bowie's "classic 'pop' period" and brought him to more experimental territory and "arguably greater musical daring".

During the Pin Ups sessions, he told reporters that he wanted to create a musical, using various titles such as Tragic Moments and Revenge, or The Best Haircut I Ever Had. His guitarist Mick Ronson recalled: "[Bowie] had all these little projects ... [and] wasn't quite sure what he wanted to do." As Ronson began work on his solo album Slaughter on 10th Avenue, Bowie and his wife Angie moved out of Beckenham's Haddon Hall because of harassment by fans. They moved initially into an apartment in Maida Vale, rented to them by the actress Diana Rigg, before moving into a larger house on Oakley Street, Chelsea. According to Buckley, David Bowie's manager Tony Defries prevented this move initially, citing the house as "too extravagant". Despite RCA Records estimating Bowie's album and single sales in the UK at over two million copies combined, Defries said that sales did not provide Bowie with enough income to afford the house. In spite of Defries, Bowie bought the house and it was here the Bowies spent time with Rod Stewart and Ronnie Wood of the Faces, Mick Jagger and his then-wife Bianca, and the American singer and model Ava Cherry, with whom Bowie had an affair during this time.

Along with recording Pin Ups, Bowie participated in other musical ventures in 1973. He co-produced and played on Lulu's recording of "The Man Who Sold the World", which was released as a single in January 1974, contributed to Steeleye Span's Now We Are Six, and formed a trio called the Astronettes, comprising Cherry, Jason Guess and Geoff MacCormack. The group recorded sessions at Olympic Studios in London but the project was ultimately shelved in January; a compilation album titled People from Bad Homes (later The Astronettes Sessions) was released in 1995. Bowie reworked songs from these sessions in subsequent years. (Note: These included "I Am a Laser" and "People from Bad Homes" (early versions of "Scream Like a Baby" and "Fashion" respectively, from 1980's Scary Monsters (and Super Creeps)) and a cover of the Beach Boys' "God Only Knows" (covered by Bowie for 1984's Tonight).) Buckley writes that the songs he recorded featured a blend of glam rock and soul, which proved to be the direction Bowie took in 1974.

== Writing ==
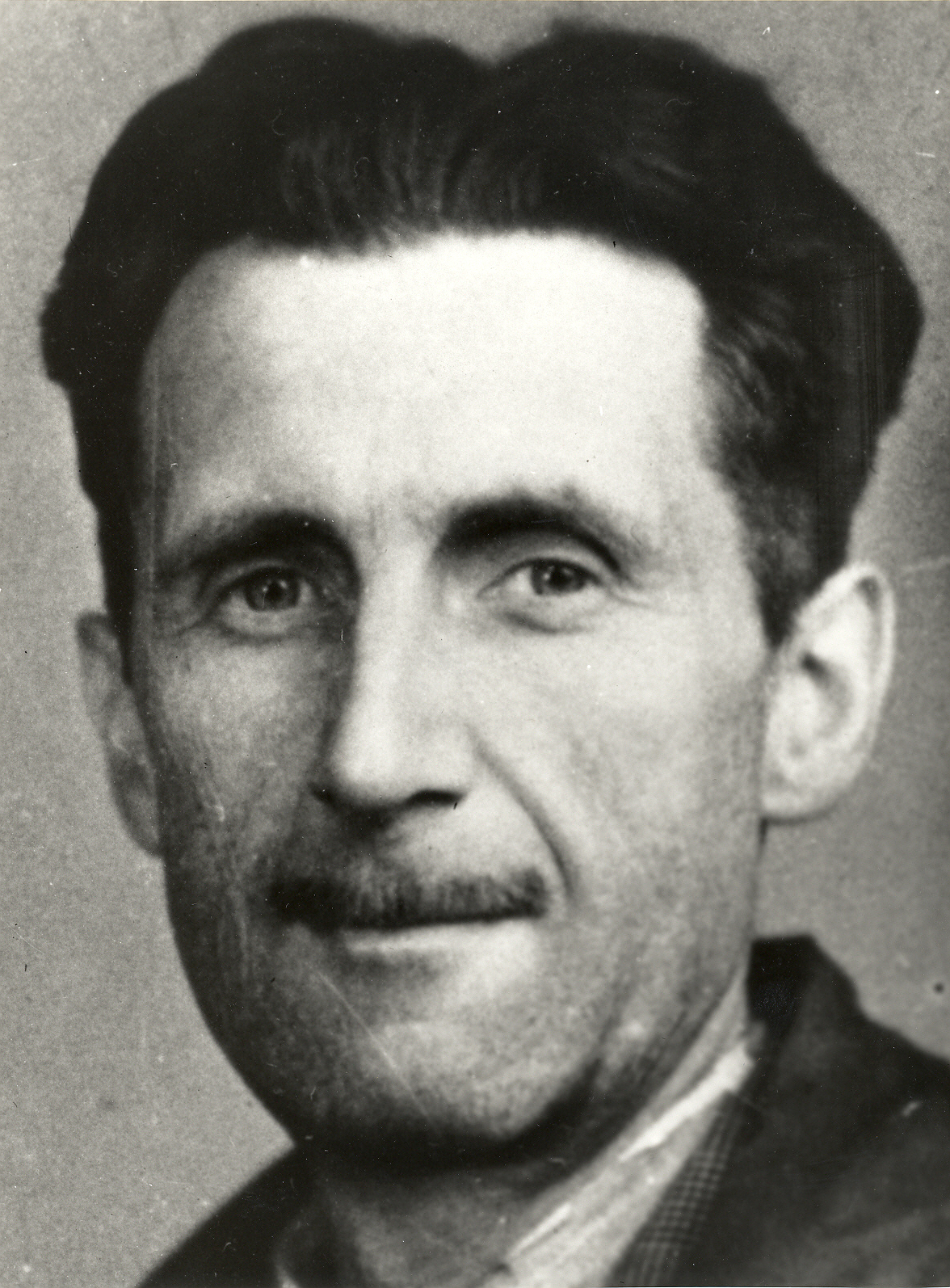
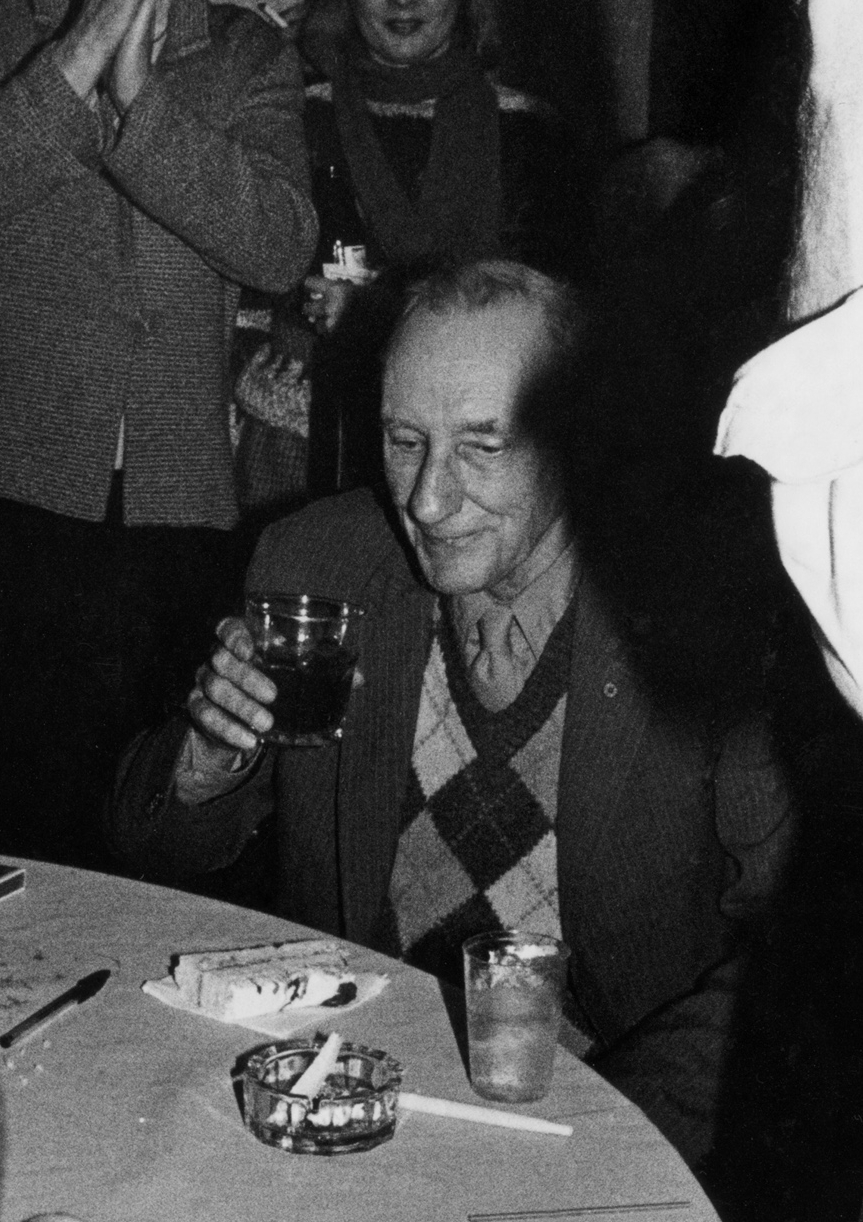
The 1949 novel Nineteen Eighty-Four by George Orwell (left) and the writings of William S. Burroughs (right) influenced the overall theme of Diamond Dogs.

According to the biographer Chris O'Leary, Diamond Dogs is a combination of numerous projects Bowie envisioned at the time. In November 1973, Bowie conducted an interview with the writer William S. Burroughs for Rolling Stone. Published in February 1974, the interview gave insight into Bowie's current ambitions. An admirer of Burroughs's working methods and his 1964 novel Nova Express, Bowie revealed he had begun using Burroughs's "cut-up" technique as a way for inspiration. He spoke of a musical based on Ziggy Stardust, saying: "Forty scenes are in it and it would be nice if the characters and actors learned the scenes and we all shuffled them around in a hat the afternoon of the performance and just performed it as the scenes come out." He also casually mentioned adapting George Orwell's 1949 novel Nineteen Eighty-Four, a Bowie favourite, for television. He had wanted to create a theatrical production of the novel and began writing material after completing sessions for Pin Ups. Neither of these projects came to fruition.

The Ziggy Stardust musical fell through, but Bowie salvaged two songs for Diamond Dogs he had written for it—"Rebel Rebel" and "Rock 'n' Roll with Me". At the end of 1973, George Orwell's widow, Sonia Orwell, denied Bowie the rights to use the novel. The rejection annoyed Bowie, who lambasted her for it in Circus magazine a few years later. She refused to allow any adaptation of her late husband's work for the rest of her life. No adaptations were possible until after her death in 1980. Unable to adapt the novel, Bowie decided to create his own apocalyptic scenario inspired by the works of Burroughs. Songs from this scenario included what became the album's title track and "Future Legend".

== Recording ==
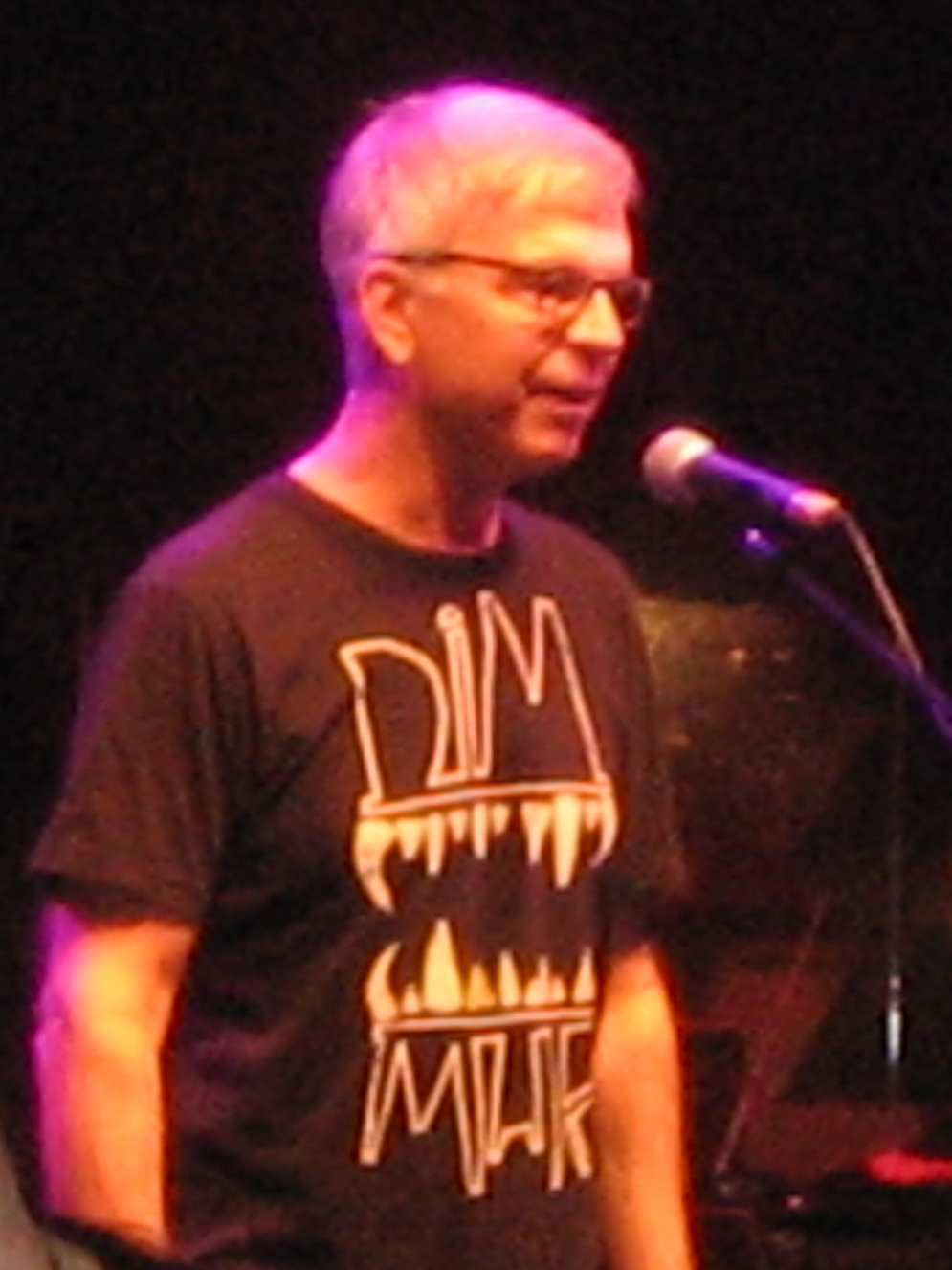
Diamond Dogs reunited Bowie with producer Tony Visconti (pictured in 2007), who worked with Bowie for the rest of the decade.

Buckley writes that the album was the first time Bowie used a recording studio as an instrument. With Scott's departure, Bowie produced the album himself. Keith Harwood, who had worked previously with the Rolling Stones, and on Led Zeppelin's Houses of the Holy, handled engineering duties. Nicholas Pegg writes that despite Bowie and Harwood's previous collaborations on Mott the Hoople's All the Young Dudes and the original version of "John, I'm Only Dancing" (both 1972), Diamond Dogs was Harwood's first credit on a Bowie album. Bowie described being "in awe" of Harwood because of his work with the Stones. Given the departure of the Spiders from Mars, Bowie played lead guitar. He recalled in 1997 that he practised every day knowing "the guitar playing had to be more than okay". This surprised NME critics Roy Carr and Charles Shaar Murray, producing what they described as a "scratchy, raucous, semi-amateurish sound that gave the album much of its characteristic flavour".

The pianist Mike Garson and the drummer Aynsley Dunbar returned from the Pin Ups sessions, Tony Newman also played drums while Herbie Flowers, who had played previously on Space Oddity (1969), was recruited to play bass. Alan Parker of Blue Mink played guest guitar on "1984" and "augmented" Bowie's riff on "Rebel Rebel", although he was only credited for "1984". Bowie's longtime friend Geoff MacCormack, now known as Warren Peace, sang backing vocals. Diamond Dogs reunited Bowie with Tony Visconti, who provided string arrangements and helped mix the album at his studio in London. Visconti co-produced much of Bowie's work for the rest of the decade.

Before the Nineteen Eighty-Four project was denied, Bowie worked on "1984", recording it on 19 January 1973 during the sessions for Aladdin Sane. Initial work on Diamond Dogs began in late October 1973 at Trident Studios in London, where Bowie and Scott recorded "1984" in a medley with "Dodo", titled "1984/Dodo", mixed the track: this session was the last time the two worked together. According to O'Leary, this session was also the last time Bowie worked with Ronson and Bolder. The medley had already made its public debut on the American television show The 1980 Floor Show recorded in London on 18–20 October 1973. A cover of Bruce Springsteen's "Growin' Up", with Ronnie Wood on lead guitar, was also recorded during this time. Recording for the album at Olympic officially began at the start of 1974. Bowie had started to work on "Rebel Rebel" during a solo session at Trident following Christmas 1973. (Note: This was Bowie's last known visit to Trident, his principal recording studio since 1968.) On New Year's Day, the group recorded "Candidate" and "Take It In Right", an early version of "Can You Hear Me" from Young Americans (1975). Following the final sessions with the Astronettes, recording continued from 14 to 15 January, with the group recording "Rock 'n' Roll with Me", "Candidate", "Big Brother", "Take It In Right" and the title track. The following day, Bowie recorded "We Are the Dead", after which he contacted Visconti for mixing advice. "Rebel Rebel" was finished around this time. Recording was finished at Ludolph Studios in the Netherlands, where the Stones had just finished recording It's Only Rock 'n Roll (1974).

== Music and lyrics ==
Diamond Dogs was Bowie's last album in the glam rock genre. Buckley writes: "In the sort of move which would come to define his career, Bowie jumped the glam-rock ship just in time, before it drifted into a blank parody of itself." The album has often been regarded as an "English proto-punk" record, according to the cultural studies academic Jon Stratton, who calls it "post-glam". The pop culture scholar Shelton Waldrep describes it as "wonderfully dark proto-punk", while the music journalist C. M. Crockford says it is "the goofy, abrasive place where punk and art-rock meet, dance a little, and depart". In the opinion of The Guardian's Adam Sweeting, while "the music still has one foot in the glam-rock camp", the album marks the point in Bowie's career where he "began exploring a kind of Weimar soul music with lavish theatrical packaging", featuring Broadway-style ballads such as "Big Brother" and "Sweet Thing". Nicholas Pegg describes the album as having "manic alternations between power-charged garage rock and sophisticated, synthesiser-heavy apocalyptic ballads". The biographer Christopher Sandford writes that beyond the overall concept, many of the songs delve into R&B. Pitchfork's Barry Walters wrote that although the album is still primarily glam rock, it also contains elements of "Blaxploitation funk and soul, rock opera, European art song, and Broadway."

=== Side one ===
They were all little Johnny Rottens and Sid Viciouses really. And, in my mind, there was no means of transport ... So there were these gangs of squeaking, roller-skating, vicious hoods, with Bowie knives and furs on, and they were all skinny because they hadn't eaten enough, and they all had funny-coloured hair. In a way, it was a precursor to the punk thing.

— David Bowie describing the Diamond Dogs

The opening track, "Future Legend", is a spoken word track that depicts a post-apocalyptic urban landscape. The writings of Burroughs, especially The Wild Boys (1971) inspire the visions of decay. The author Peter Doggett notes that unlike the opening of Ziggy Stardust, which announces the world will end in five years, the apocalypse of "Future Legend" could happen at any time. Bowie begins the title track by announcing, "This ain't rock'n'roll – this is genocide". The track introduces Bowie's newest persona, Halloween Jack, described as "a real cool cat" who "lives on top of Manhattan Chase" in the urban wasteland depicted in "Future Legend". He rules the "diamond dogs", who O'Leary describes as "packs of feral kids camped on high-rise roofs, tearing around on roller skates, terrorizing the corpse-strewn streets they live above". Although Jack is commonly identified as one of Bowie's "identities" like Ziggy Stardust and Aladdin Sane, Doggett notes that Jack occupies "little more than a cameo role". The riff and saxophone are inspired by the Rolling Stones. The biographer Marc Spitz notes that it is the same "jaded commentator's voice" Bowie had used on Aladdin Sane.

Multiple biographers cite the suite of "Sweet Thing/Candidate/Sweet Thing (Reprise)" as the album's highlight. Pegg describes Bowie's vocal performance, which he believes to be one of his finest, as a croon. "Sweet Thing" paints pictures of decay, with sex being a "drug-like commodity" while "Candidate" contains references to Charles Manson and Muhammad Ali, with Bowie being "consumed by the fakery of his own stage creations". "Rebel Rebel", cited by Pegg as Bowie's most covered track, is based around a distinctive guitar riff reminiscent of the Rolling Stones and was his farewell to the glam rock era. According to Pegg, Parker "added the three descending notes at the end of each loop of the riff". The song features a character who predates 1970s punk rock and gender-bending lyrics ("You got your mother in a whirl / She's not sure if you're a boy or a girl"). Some commentators praised the song itself but felt it did not contribute to the overall theme of the album. Doggett, however, writes that the song acts as the "musical continuation" of the "Sweet Thing" suite.

=== Side two ===
Bowie and MacCormack co-wrote "Rock 'n' Roll with Me"; it was Bowie's first co-writing credit on one of his own albums. MacCormack said his contribution was minimal—he played the chord sequence on piano. A power ballad, the song explores the relationship between the audience and an actor. When asked whether fans considered him a leader, Bowie described "Rock 'n' Roll with Me" as his response, saying: "You're doing it to me, stop it!" Buckley writes the song foreshadowed the soul direction that Bowie took on Young Americans. The lyrics of "We Are the Dead" reflect the characters of Nineteen Eighty-Four, Winston and Julia's, love for each other. They establish a world fraught with danger that mirrors the rest of the album. Buckley describes the lyrics as "gothic" and the music as "creepy". Although it quotes Nineteen Eighty-Four directly, O'Leary and James Perone argue the song owes more to the writings of Burroughs.

"1984" was the signature number for Bowie's planned adaptation of Nineteen Eighty-Four. It has been interpreted as representing Winston Smith's imprisonment and interrogation by O'Brien. The lyrics also bear some similarities to Bowie's earlier song "All the Madmen" (1970)—"They'll split your pretty cranium and fill it full of air." AllMusic's Donald A. Guarisco wrote: "Bowie's recording of "1984" fully realizes the song's cinematic potential with a dramatic arrangement that utilizes skittering strings and a throbbing wah-wah guitar line that effectively mirrors the song's clipped, militaristic rhythms." Originally recorded during the Aladdin Sane sessions, the rerecording's wah-wah guitar is reminiscent of Isaac Hayes's "Theme from Shaft". Guarisco and Pegg felt the song's funk and soul nature fully predicted the direction Bowie took on Young Americans.

According to Pegg, the theme of "Big Brother" is "the dangerous charisma of absolute power and the facility with which societies succumb to totalitarianism's final solutions". It was a possible contender to close Bowie's adaptation of Nineteen Eighty-Four. Featuring synthesisers and saxophones, the track builds to a climax that Buckley considers reminiscent of The Man Who Sold the World. The track segues into "Chant of the Ever Circling Skeletal Family", a variation on "Two Minutes Hate" from Nineteen Eighty-Four. It is a chant in 5/4 and 6/4 time, with a distorted guitar loop. On the original LP, the word brother repeats in a "stuck-needle effect", similar to the ending of the Beatles' Sgt. Pepper's Lonely Hearts Club Band (1967).

== Artwork and packaging ==
[Bowie] tricked me into doing the cover artwork. It was only when we were at the session that he finally asked me if I would do a painting for him. The idea was so interesting I couldn't resist.

— Guy Peellaert on doing the cover artwork, 2000

The cover artwork depicts Bowie as a striking half-man, half-dog grotesque. He sports his Ziggy Stardust haircut and two "freak-show" dogs surround him shown against a backdrop of New York City. The artwork originated from a photo session with the photographer Terry O'Neill. Bowie opted not to use any of his previous cover artwork photographers and instead requested the services of the Belgian artist Guy Peellaert, whose recently published Rock Dreams catalogue, featuring numerous airbrushed and exploited photographs, was growing in popularity. Bowie invited Peellaert to the photoshoot where he posed as a dog and with a Great Dane brought to the session. Bowie requested Peellaert develop a painting for the artwork, based on a storyboard idea where he appeared as a half-man, half-dog, stylistically similar to Peellaert's artwork for the Rolling Stones' It's Only Rock 'n Roll. Peellaert agreed, basing the backdrop on a book he owned about Coney Island's Pleasure Park. The two dogs behind Bowie were based on the Island's Cavalcade Variety Show performers Alzoria Lewis (known as "the Turtle Girl") and Johanna Dickens (known as "the Bear Girl").

The artwork was controversial as the full image on the gatefold sleeve showed the hybrid's genitalia. RCA had the genitalia airbrushed from the sleeve used for most releases. Some original uncensored copies made their way into circulation at the time of the album's release. According to the record-collector publication Goldmine price guides, these albums have been among the most expensive record collectibles of all time, selling for thousands of US dollars for a single copy. Other changes to the artwork included the substitution of the freak show badge "Alive" with the word "Bowie"; Bowie was credited simply as "Bowie", continuing the convention established with Pin Ups. Rykodisc/EMI restored Peelaert's original uncensored artwork for the album's re-release in 1990. Subsequent reissues have included a rejected inner gatefold image featuring Bowie in a sombrero cordobés holding onto a ravenous dog with a copy of Walter Ross's novel The Immortal at his feet. Rolling Stone ranked the cover the 51st best album cover of all time in 2024.

== Release and promotion ==
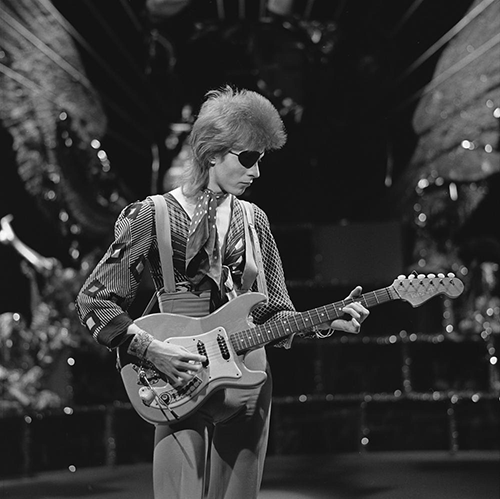
Bowie performing "Rebel Rebel" on Top Pop in February 1974

In the UK, RCA released the lead single, "Rebel Rebel", on 15 February 1974, backed by the Hunky Dory track "Queen Bitch". The same day, Bowie recorded a lip synced performance of "Rebel Rebel" at Hilversum's Avro Studio 2 for the Dutch television programme Top Pop. Broadcast two days later, it featured Bowie donning what Pegg calls his short-lived "pirate image"—an eyepatch and a spotted neckerchief. Bowie changed this costume after the performance in favour of the "swept-back parting and double-breasted suits" of the Diamond Dogs Tour. For its US release, Bowie recorded a new mix in April 1974. Dubbed the "Latin dub mix" by Doggett, this mix was released in New York in May 1974, with "Lady Grinning Soul" as the B-side. The single was a commercial success, peaking at number 5 on the UK Singles Chart and number 64 on the US Billboard Hot 100. It further became a glam anthem, the female equivalent of Bowie's earlier hit for Mott the Hoople, "All the Young Dudes".

RCA issued Diamond Dogs on 24 May 1974 with the catalogue number APLI 0576. (Note: The release date is disputed. O'Leary and Sandford write it was 24 April, while Cann and Pegg say it was 31 May.) The album was a commercial success, peaking at number one on the UK Albums Chart and number five on the US Billboard Top LPs & Tape chart. A $400,000 advertising campaign featuring billboards in Times Square and Sunset Boulevard, magazine ads, subway posters declaring "The Year of the Diamond Dogs" and a television commercial, one of the first of its kind for a pop album according to Pegg, boosted its sales in the US. In Canada, it repeated its British chart-topping success, hitting number one on the RPM 100 national albums chart in July 1974, remaining there for two weeks. RCA released the second single, "Diamond Dogs", on 14 June 1974, with a rerecorded version of Bowie's 1971 single "Holy Holy" as the B-side. It was Bowie's least-successful single in two years, peaking at number 21 on the UK Singles Chart and failing to chart in the US. In July, "1984" was released as the third single in the US and Japan, but failed to chart. Reviewing the single the following month, Billboard described "1984" as Bowie's "most commercial cut ... in a long time".

=== Tour ===
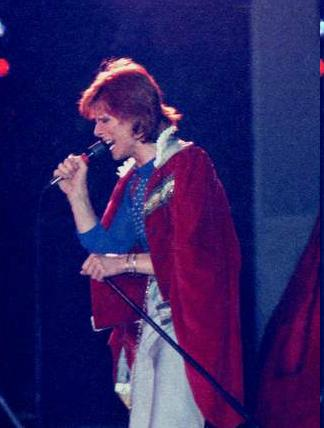
Bowie performing during the Diamond Dogs Tour in July 1974

Bowie supported the album on the Diamond Dogs Tour, whose first leg lasted from 14 June to 20 July 1974. Co-designed and constructed by Chris Langhart, it featured elaborate set-pieces and cost $250,000. Fritz Lang's Metropolis (1927) and Robert Wiene's The Cabinet of Dr. Caligari (1920) influenced the tour's design, primarily due to Bowie's interest in German expressionism. The tour's second leg, from 2 September to 1 December 1974, has been nicknamed the Soul Tour, because of the influence of the soul music Bowie had begun recording for Young Americans in August. The shows were altered heavily, and no longer featured elaborate set-pieces, partly because Bowie had tired of the design and wanted to explore the new sound he was creating. Bowie dropped songs from the previous leg, while he added new ones—some from Young Americans.

In early September, director Alan Yentob filmed a documentary that depicts Bowie on the tour in Los Angeles, using a mixture of sequences filmed in limousines, hotels and concert footage, most of which was taken from a show there at Universal Amphitheatre on 2 September. Broadcast on BBC1 in the UK on 26 January 1975, Cracked Actor is notable as a primary source of footage of the Diamond Dogs Tour, and for showing Bowie's declining mental state during this period because of his growing cocaine addiction. After seeing an advanced screening of the film, the director Nicolas Roeg immediately contacted Bowie to discuss a role in The Man Who Fell to Earth (1976).

Bowie played all of the album's songs except "We Are the Dead" on the tour, performances of which have been released on three live albums: David Live (1974), Cracked Actor (2017) and I'm Only Dancing (The Soul Tour 74) (2020). "Rebel Rebel" featured on almost every later Bowie tour, "Diamond Dogs" was performed for the Isolar, Outside and A Reality Tours, and "Big Brother/Chant of the Ever Circling Skeletal Family" was resurrected in 1987 for the Glass Spider Tour, which itself was heavily influenced by the Diamond Dogs tour. The Diamond Dogs Tour has had a lasting legacy. Sandford says the tour turned Bowie from a "novelty act" into a "superstar". Spitz writes it was highly influential on future tours with large and elaborate set pieces, including Parliament-Funkadelic's Mothership Connection tour, Elvis Presley's Vegas period, the 1990s tours of U2 and Madonna, and 'N Sync, the Backstreet Boys, Britney Spears and Kanye West's 2008 Glow in the Dark Tour.

== Critical reception ==
The album received mixed reviews from music critics on release. Disc magazine compared the album to "the greatly underrated" The Man Who Sold the World, believing it to contain some of Bowie's best-written songs and "without doubt the finest [LP] he's made so far", while Rock Magazine found it "a strong and effective album, and certainly the most impressive work Bowie's completed since Ziggy Stardust". Martin Kirkup of Sounds wrote, "where Aladdin Sane seemed like a series of Instamatic snapshots taken from weird angles, Diamond Dogs has the provoking quality of a thought-out painting that draws on all the deeper colors". Billboard saw a "subtler, more aesthetic Bowie" than his previous records on an album "which should reinforce his musical presence in the 70's". Peter Harvey of Record Mirror was disappointed regarding the absence of the Spiders and wished the lyrical themes were more upbeat, but predicted the record would make a good stage production.

Melody Maker's Chris Charlesworth called the album "really good" and compared it to Phil Spector's Wall of Sound method of production and noting the similar level of excitement and praise Bowie's albums were beginning to receive as the Beatles did in the 60s. Robert Christgau was more critical in Creem, suggesting that Bowie performs a pale imitation of Bryan Ferry's "theatrical vocalism". He also dismissed the lyrical content as "escapist pessimism concocted from a pleasure dome: eat, snort and bugger little girls, for tomorrow we shall be peoploids – but tonight how about $6.98 for this piece of plastic? Say nay." Ken Emerson of Rolling Stone gave the album an extremely negative review, calling it, "Bowie's worst album in six years". He criticised Bowie's choice of direction, the absence of Ronson, describing Bowie's guitar playing as "cheesy" adding "the music exerts so little appeal that it's hard to care what it's about". Despite the album's mixed reception, John Rockwell of The New York Times found it inoffensive and "surrealisticnihilistic".

== Influence and legacy ==
Diamond Dogs' raw guitar style and visions of urban chaos, scavenging children and nihilistic lovers ("We'll buy some drugs and watch a band / Then jump in a river holding hands") have been credited with anticipating the punk revolution that took place in the following years. According to the Rolling Stone writer Mark Kemp, the album's "resigned nihilism inspired interesting gloom and doom from later goth and industrial acts such as Bauhaus and Nine Inch Nails". O'Leary writes that Bowie's appearance in the promotional video for "Rebel Rebel" inspired future punks' styles and attitudes. He continues that initial British punks were former fans of Bowie and Roxy Music, and "Rebel Rebel" stands as both Bowie's goodbye and tribute to them. Crockford further acknowledges the album's influence on punk, stating: "Bowie's violent, amateurishly scraping guitar playing here would be echoed in the late-'70s post-punk bands and Diamond Dogs' concept of street gangs roaming London was echoed in the gleeful nihilism of the Sex Pistols." Considering Bowie's direction afterwards through the punk and disco eras, Stylus Magazine's Derek Miller says, "Diamond Dogs should be remembered not only as one of glam’s last great full-lengths but more importantly as a gap-record that somehow manages to cohesively storyboard Bowie's crude conceptual surrealism while also expanding his sound."

=== Retrospective appraisal ===
Retrospective professional ratings
Review scores
Source	Rating
AllMusic	2.5/5 stars
Blender	3/5 stars
Chicago Tribune	2/4 stars
Christgau's Record Guide	C+
Encyclopedia of Popular Music	4/5 stars
The Guardian	4/5 stars
Pitchfork	9.0/10
Q	5/5 stars
The Rolling Stone Album Guide	2.5/5 stars
Select	5/5
Spin Alternative Record Guide	3/10

Retrospective appraisals have been mixed. AllMusic's Stephen Thomas Erlewine said that, because Bowie did not completely retire the character of Ziggy Stardust, Diamond Dogs suffers from him being unsure how to move forward. Although he praised "Rebel Rebel", he further criticised the exclusion of Ronson and ultimately concluded "it is the first record since Space Oddity where Bowie's reach exceeds his grasp". Greg Kot of the Chicago Tribune gave the album a mixed review, calling it "an overproduced concept album inspired by Orwell's 1984". Eduardo Rivadavia was also mixed in Ultimate Classic Rock, questioning the presence of Ziggy, whom Bowie supposedly retired the year before. Despite the album's commercial success, Rivadavia concluded: "with decades of hindsight, Diamond Dogs now seems more like the gateway from the Ziggy Stardust era to his Thin White Duke blue-eyed soul period, and beyond".

The record has attracted positive reviews. Pitchfork's Barry Walters described the album as "a bummer, a bad trip, 'No Fun' – a sustained work of decadence and dread that transforms corrosion into celebration". He also believed it foreshadowed Bowie's Thin White Duke persona. For punknews.org, C. M. Crockford wrote that Diamond Dogs is Bowie's "utterly most distinctive work: melodramatic, raw, challenging, and ambitious even when crammed with catchy songs". Crockford ultimately called it one of Bowie's essential releases and argued that he would "never make an album that was so obviously his own again". In a 2013 readers' poll for Rolling Stone, Diamond Dogs was voted Bowie's fifth-greatest album.

In subsequent decades, Bowie biographers have described Diamond Dogs as one of Bowie's greatest works. Cann writes: "Diamond Dogs is arguably [Bowie's] most significant album, a pivotal work and the most 'solo' album he has ever made." Although Spitz calls it "no fun", he states it was Bowie's "best-sounding, most complex record to date, and it still pulls you into its romantic and doomed world three and a half decades on". Trynka calls it "a beautiful mess", while Buckley says the album proved that Bowie could still produce work of "real quality" without Scott or the Spiders. Doggett writes it anticipated the "sonic audacity" of Low and "Heroes", while it simultaneously "capsized the vessel of classic rock". Perone argues that "Chant of the Ever Circling Skeletal Family" predated Talking Heads' exploration of African rhythms and experimentation in the late 1970s. Pegg writes that with tracks like "We Are the Dead", "Big Brother" and the "Sweet Thing" suite, the album contains "some of the most sublime and remarkable sounds in the annals of rock music". He further states that Bowie's new voice on the record, a "basso profundo", particularly evident on "Sweet Thing" and "Big Brother", was a major influence on gothic rock bands in the 1980s. It ranked number 447 in NME's list of the 500 Greatest Albums of All Time and number 14 in Rolling Stone's list of the 74 Best Albums of 1974. It was voted number 995 in the third edition of Colin Larkin's All Time Top 1000 Albums.

=== Reissues ===
Diamond Dogs has been reissued several times. Although the original 1974 vinyl releases featured a gatefold cover, some later LP versions such as RCA's 1980 US reissue presented the album in a standard non-gatefold sleeve. The album was first released on CD in the mid-1980s by RCA, with censored cover art. The German (for the European market) and Japanese (for the US market) masters, sourced from different tapes, are not identical. Dr. Toby Mountain at Northeastern Digital, in Southborough, Massachusetts, remastered Diamond Dogs from the original master tapes for Rykodisc in 1990, released with two bonus tracks and the original, uncensored, artwork. It was again remastered in 1999 by Peter Mew at Abbey Road Studios for EMI and Virgin Records, and once more released with no bonus tracks.

In 2004, a 2-disc version was released by EMI/Virgin. The third in a series of 30th Anniversary 2CD Editions (along with Ziggy Stardust and Aladdin Sane), this release included a remastered version of the album on the first disc. The second disc contains eight tracks, five of which had been released previously with the Sound + Vision box set in 1989 or as bonus tracks on the 1990–92 Rykodisc/EMI reissues. In 2016, the album was remastered for the Who Can I Be Now? (1974–1976) box set. It was released on CD and vinyl, and in digital formats, both as part of this compilation and separately.

== Track listing ==
All tracks written by David Bowie, except "Rock 'n' Roll with Me", lyrics by Bowie; music by Bowie and Geoff MacCormack.

Side one
No.	Title	Length
1.	"Future Legend"	0:58
2.	"Diamond Dogs"	5:50
3.	"Sweet Thing"	3:29
4.	"Candidate"	2:39
5.	"Sweet Thing (Reprise)"	2:32
6.	"Rebel Rebel"	4:21

Side two
No.	Title	Length
7.	"Rock 'n' Roll with Me"	3:54
8.	"We Are the Dead"	4:48
9.	"1984"	3:24
10.	"Big Brother"	3:25
11.	"Chant of the Ever Circling Skeletal Family"	1:48

== Personnel ==
Adapted from the Diamond Dogs liner notes and biographer Nicholas Pegg.

- David Bowie – lead and background vocals, guitar, saxophones, Moog synthesiser, Mellotron
- Mike Garson – keyboards
- Herbie Flowers – bass guitar
- Tony Newman – drums
- Aynsley Dunbar – drums
- Alan Parker – guitar ("1984"), additional guitar ("Rebel Rebel")

Technical

- David Bowie – producer; mixing
- Tony Visconti – strings on "1984"; mixing
- Keith Harwood – engineer; mixing
- Leee Black Childers – photography
- Guy Peellaert – cover painting

== Charts and certifications ==
=== Weekly charts ===
1974 weekly chart performance for Diamond Dogs
Chart (1974)	Peak Position
Australian Albums (Go-Set)	1
Australian Albums (Kent Music Report)	3
Canadian Albums (RPM)	1
Finnish Albums (Suomen virallinen lista)	5
French Albums (SNEP)	4
Italian Albums (Billboard)	9
Italian Albums (Musica e dischi)	16
Norwegian Albums (VG-lista)	8
Spanish Albums (Promusicae)	11
Swedish Albums (Kvällstoppen)	3
UK Albums (Official Charts)	1
US Billboard Top LPs & Tape	5
West German Media Control Albums (GfK)	40
Yugoslavian Albums (Radio TV Revue & Studio)	10

1990 weekly chart performance for Diamond Dogs
Chart (1990)	Peak Position
UK Albums (Official Charts)	67

2016 weekly chart performance for Diamond Dogs
Chart (2016)	Peak Position
Australian Albums (ARIA)	41
Italian Albums (FIMI)	79
Portuguese Albums (AFP)	48

2024 weekly chart performance for Diamond Dogs
Chart (2024)	Peak Position
Hungarian Physical Albums (MAHASZ)	17
Scottish Albums (Official Charts)	13

=== Year-end charts ===
1974 year-end chart performance for Diamond Dogs
Chart (1974)	Position
Australian Albums (Kent Music Report)	20
Canadian Albums (RPM)	15
French Albums (SNEP)	11
UK Albums (OCC)	6

=== Certifications and sales ===
Certifications for Diamond Dogs
Region	Certification	Certified units/sales
Sweden (GLF)	Gold	50,000^{^}
United Kingdom (BPI) 1999 release	Gold	100,000^{^}
United States (RIAA)	Gold	500,000^{^}
Summaries
Worldwide	—	3,800,000
^{^} Shipments figures based on certification alone.
