= Geoff MacCormack =

English musician

Geoffrey Alexander MacCormack (born 1947), also known by his former stage name Warren Peace, is an English singer, songwriter, dancer and photographer best known for his work with David Bowie in the 1970s.

== Musical career ==
A long-time friend of Bowie since their schooldays in Bromley, Peace (initially as GA MacCormack) contributed backing vocals to a number of albums, beginning with Aladdin Sane in 1973 and continuing through to Station to Station in 1976. He appeared with Bowie during his 1973 tour of the US and Japan, travelling back to the UK via the Trans-Siberian Railway with the singer, who refused to fly. He then performed on the final UK leg of the tour which ended with Ziggy Stardust's 'retirement' at the Hammersmith Odeon in July (later released as Ziggy Stardust – The Motion Picture).

With Bowie, Peace co-wrote the music for "Rock 'n' Roll with Me" on Diamond Dogs (1974) and later "Turn Blue" on Iggy Pop's Lust for Life (1977). He also appeared as an 'Astronette' dancer and vocalist in The 1980 Floor Show television special with Bowie in October 1973 and as one of the 'Diamond Dogs' dancer/vocalists on Bowie's 1974 US tour (recorded and released as David Live). With fellow Astronettes Ava Cherry and Jason Guess, and Bowie as writer/producer, Peace recorded an album's worth of material at Olympic Studios late in 1973, which was eventually released as People from Bad Homes in 1995.

In 1976, Peace quit performing to start his own songwriting company and continue his passion for photography. The last time he and Bowie saw each other before the latter's death was in New York City in 2013.

Peace described his stage name as "a mythical character invented for a mythical period". When asked where it came from, he said: "I was just hanging out with Ava [Cherry] and David, and it just came into my stupid head. Oddly, the same name was used by a music journalist and a character in an American teen movie called Sky High."

== Other work ==
In 2007, Peace (once again under his real name Geoff MacCormack) published From Station to Station: Travels with Bowie 1973-76, an illustrated account of his time in Bowie's entourage. In 2023 he published the photographic memoir David Bowie: Rock 'n' Roll with Me.

In 2025, an exhibition featuring photographs that MacCormack took of Bowie in the early-to-mid 70s, opened in Winchester, Hampshire.

== Discography ==
=== David Bowie ===
- Aladdin Sane (1973) – backing vocals (as GA MacCormack, sometimes credited as Mac Cormack)
- Pin Ups (1973) – backing vocals (as GA MacCormack, sometimes credited as Mac Cormack)
- Diamond Dogs (1974) – co-composer ("Rock 'n' Roll with Me")
- David Live (1974) – backing vocals, co-composer ("Rock 'n' Roll with Me")
- Young Americans (1975) - backing vocals ("Right")
- Station to Station (1976) – backing vocals
- Ziggy Stardust – The Motion Picture (1983, performance from 1973) – backing vocals, percussion
- Bowie at the Beeb (2000, performance from 1971) – backing vocals (as Geoffrey Alexander)
- Cracked Actor (Live Los Angeles '74) (2017, performance from 1974) - backing vocals

=== Iggy Pop ===
- Lust for Life (1977) – co-composer ("Turn Blue")

=== The Astronettes ===
- People from Bad Homes (recorded 1973, released 1995) – vocals
