= Golden Years (David Bowie song) =

1975 single by David Bowie

- US single

Single by David Bowie

from the album Station to Station
- B-side: "Can You Hear Me?"
- Released: 21 November 1975
- Recorded: 21–30 September 1975
- Studio: Cherokee (Los Angeles)
- Genre: Funk; disco; doo-wop; pop
- Length: 4:03 (album version); 3:27 (single version)
- Label: RCA
- Songwriter: David Bowie
- Producers: David Bowie; Harry Maslin

David Bowie singles chronology
| "Fame" (1975) | "Golden Years" (1975) | "TVC 15" (1976) |

"Golden Years" is a song by the English musician David Bowie, released by RCA Records on 21 November 1975 as the lead single from his tenth studio album Station to Station (1976). Partially written before Bowie began shooting for the film The Man Who Fell to Earth (1976), the song was mostly compiled in the studio and was the first track completed for the album. Co-produced by Bowie and Harry Maslin, recording took place at Cherokee Studios in Los Angeles during September 1975. Due to Bowie's heavy cocaine use, he later mentioned remembering almost nothing of Station to Station's production.

Musically, "Golden Years" is a funk and disco song that is reminiscent of the music on Bowie's previous album, Young Americans (1975), particularly "Fame", but with a harsher, grinding edge. The song utilises elements of several 1950s doo-wop tracks in its arrangement. Lyrically, the narrator offers a companion hope of entering a limousine and being isolated from the outside world. In other words, he assures his companion that she will always be protected by him and promises her a brighter future.

"Golden Years" has been viewed positively by music critics and biographers, who have highlighted its composition. Bowie preceded its release by miming the song on Soul Train, where he appeared incoherent. Upon release, the song was a commercial success, peaking at number eight in the UK and number ten in the US. The song was rarely played throughout Bowie's 1976 Isolar tour but regularly on other tours. "Golden Years" has appeared on lists of Bowie's best songs and has been included on various compilation albums, covered by numerous artists and made appearances in several films and soundtracks, including A Knight's Tale (2001), which featured a new remix by Bowie's longtime collaborator Tony Visconti.

== Background and recording ==
David Bowie started writing "Golden Years" in May 1975 before shooting commenced for the film The Man Who Fell to Earth (1976). Sources differ as to whom the track was written for. Bowie's biographers state the track was supposedly written for American singer Elvis Presley, who turned it down. Bowie recalled that Presley had heard the demos and, because both artists were signed to RCA Records at the time, Presley's manager Colonel Tom Parker thought that Bowie should write songs for Presley. Bowie stated that he had "adored" Presley and would have loved to work with him. Although the artists' offices contacted each other, nothing ever came to fruition. Presley sent a note to Bowie saying, "All the best, and have a great tour"; Bowie kept the note for the rest of his life. Conversely, Chris O'Leary states that the song was never presented to Presley due to stalled negotiations with Parker. David's first wife Angie Bowie later claimed he wrote the song for her, saying that he sang the track over the telephone to her, "just the way, all those years before, he'd sung me [his 1970 track] 'The Prettiest Star'. It had a similar effect. I bought it." According to Christopher Sandford, Ava Cherry also claimed to have been the inspiration for the song.

David Bowie's 1975 single "Fame", a collaboration with former Beatle John Lennon, was a massive commercial success, topping the US Billboard Hot 100. As such, RCA were eager for a follow-up. After completing his work on The Man Who Fell to Earth in September, Bowie returned to Los Angeles to begin recording his next album Station to Station. Personnel-wise, Bowie brought back the same team used for "Fame": co-producer Harry Maslin, guitarists Carlos Alomar and Earl Slick, drummer Dennis Davis and Bowie's old friend Geoff MacCormick (credited as Warren Peace), while bassist George Murray was recruited. For the studio, Bowie and Maslin chose Los Angeles's Cherokee Studios, a popular studio at the time that was more advanced than Philadelphia's Sigma Sound Studios, where Bowie had recorded Young Americans (1975); it featured five different studio rooms, 24-track mixing consoles, 24-hour session times, more space and a lounge bar.

Recording for the new album began in late September 1975 and ended in November. The prospective single "Golden Years" was the first track recorded, between 21 and 30 September. At one stage it was slated to be the album's title track. Regarding the recording, Maslin recalled that the song was "cut and finished very fast. We knew it was absolutely right within ten days. But the rest of the album took forever." Like the majority of Station to Station, the song's elements were primarily built in the studio rather than written before. MacCormick gave suggestions to Bowie for the song's arrangement, including the addition of the "WAH-wah-WAH" tags after the refrains and the "go-oh-oh-old" tags on the bridges. He also assisted Bowie on the backing vocal harmonies, recalling in his memoir: "When we came to record the backing vocals for the song, David lost his voice halfway through, leaving me to finish the job. That meant I had to sing the series of impossibly high notes before the chorus, which were difficult enough for David but were absolute murder for me." Due to Bowie's heavy cocaine use during the sessions, he later recalled remembering almost nothing of the album's production.

== Composition and lyrics ==
"Golden Years"
An audio sample, showcasing the song's elements of funk on the chorus that are more reminiscent of the style of Young Americans than the krautrock sound Bowie explored on other tracks on the album.

Station to Station is commonly regarded as a transitional album in Bowie's career, developing the funk and soul of Young Americans and introducing influences of electronic and the German music genre of krautrock, particularly bands such as Neu! and Kraftwerk, styles Bowie would further explore on his late 1970s Berlin Trilogy. Like its companion album track "Stay", "Golden Years" is built upon the styles of Young Americans but with a harsher, grinding edge. Nicholas Pegg states that the song lacks the "steelier musical landscape" of the rest of the album. The song also utilises elements of 1950s doo-wop; the main guitar riff is based on the 1968 Cliff Nobles and Company song "The Horse" and the multi-tracked vocal refrain resembles the Diamonds' 1958 single "Happy Years". Other tracks that influenced the composition of "Golden Years" included the Drifters' 1963 song "On Broadway", which Bowie played on piano during rehearsals, adding a "come buh-buh-buh baby" after each line, and Dyke and the Blazers' 1966 song "Funky Broadway" that Earl Slick used for a few riffs. Although the song overall pursues the style of "Fame", O'Leary states that it blends elements of krautrock in the main guitar riff. Commentators have categorised the song's sound as funk, disco, doo-wop, and pop.

"Golden Years" is in the key of B major and begins with a "simple two-chord" riff (F♯–E), which David Buckley believes hooks the listener instantly. Author Peter Doggett calls the riff "reminiscent"–albeit "in very different circumstances"–to the title track of Bowie's Aladdin Sane (1973). He writes that "the magical ingredients were percussive: the rattling of sticks against the hi-hat cymbal from the start, the startling clack of woodblocks, the sudden drum fills" and that these combined elements "channel" the spirit of Presley in the verses, with a "haughtier, more strident tone" in the chorus. The song features what O'Leary calls "dueling guitars", both mixed into separate channels: the right one plays variations on the opening riff throughout while the left one plays a "gliding rhythm", echoing the "WAH-wah-WAH" with a three-chord riff after the bridges.

The song's structure is unique, in that the bridges vary between two and six bars. The longer bridge features a chord progression from G major ("nothing's gonna touch you") to A minor ("golden") then an E minor 7th ("years"), ending with a 2/4 cut time bar. Here, Bowie sings "go-oh-oh-old" while Murray's bass overlays a Moog synthesiser. There is also prevalent percussion throughout, including handclaps, vibraslap and melodica. O'Leary finds Bowie almost rapping in the third verse during the lines up to "all the WAY" (sung in F♯), which is followed by the "run for the shadows" phrases before another chorus.

Biographer Marc Spitz interprets Station to Station as "an album of love songs", specifically "the kind you write when you have no love in your own life". James Perone considers "Golden Years" the type of love song that doesn't feature the word love. The song's narrator offers a companion hope of entering a limousine and being sealed off from the outside world. He assures his companion that he will always protect her no matter what and promises her a brighter future. NME editors Roy Carr and Charles Shaar Murray find that the lyric carry "an air of regret for missed opportunities and past pleasures". O'Leary states that Bowie's life in Los Angeles influenced the lyrics.

== Promotion and release ==
Bowie miming to "Golden Years" on Soul Train. He appeared visibly intoxicated and later expressed shame for his behaviour.

On 4 November 1975, Bowie appeared on the American television show Soul Train, miming "Fame" and the then-unreleased "Golden Years". Bowie was the second white artist to appear on the programme, after Elton John six months earlier. During the performance and interview, he was visibly intoxicated and, according to Pegg, was at a "new low in coherency". Bowie later felt ashamed for his behaviour, recalling in 1999 that he had failed to learn "Golden Years" and was scolded afterwards by the show's DJ. Spitz describes the appearance as "canny" and "awkward", while O'Leary calls it Bowie's "loneliest, saddest television appearance". The resulting film clip was used as the song's unofficial music video for promotion worldwide. Like "Rebel Rebel" in relation to Diamond Dogs (1974), "Golden Years" was a somewhat unrepresentative teaser for the then-upcoming album.

RCA released "Golden Years" as the lead single from Station to Station on 21 November 1975, while the album was still being finished. Its B-side was the Young Americans track "Can You Hear Me?" with the catalogue number was RCA 2640; it featured a length of 3:30. The song subsequently appeared as the second track on Station to Station, between the title track and "Word on a Wing", running 4:03 minutes. According to Pegg, the single version is "essentially" the album version with an earlier fade. The song would later appear as the B-side of fellow Station to Station track "Wild Is the Wind" in November 1981. An updated single version of "Golden Years" was released in 2011 to coincide with the re-release of Station to Station. Four new remixes were provided by DJs from radio station KCRW in California.

Following "Fame", "Golden Years" continued Bowie's commercial success. In the UK, where it quickly followed the chart-topping "Space Oddity" reissue, the single peaked at number eight on the UK Singles Chart, remaining on the chart for 10 weeks. In the US, it charted for 16 weeks on the Billboard Hot 100 and reached number 10, also peaking at number 12 on the Cash Box Top 100. The song further peaked at number 17 on the Canadian RPM Top Singles chart, number 34 on the Australian Kent Music Report, and number 18 on the New Zealand Listener chart. Following Bowie's death in 2016, the song charted in numerous countries, including in France (193) and Belgium Wallonia region (28), alongside scoring top-10 positions in Belgium Flanders region (10), Sweden (10), Ireland (9), and the Netherlands (6).

== Critical reception ==
"Golden Years" has been received positively by music critics and biographers. Reviewing Station to Station on release, John Ingham of Sounds magazine heavily praised the album, naming "Golden Years", "TVC 15" and "Stay" some of Bowie's best songs up to that point. Rolling Stone writer Teri Moris considered the track "Bowie's most seductive self-indulgence since Pin Ups [1973]". A reviewer for Billboard felt Bowie had "found his musical niche" with songs like "Fame" and "Golden Years". Record World said that the song has "a rather unadorned style and generates a basic appeal". In his book Starman, biographer Paul Trynka calls "Golden Years" "magnificent [and] sensitive", stating that the track "reflects Bowie's ability to surface from a cocaine jag and dispense insightful career advice or relate a hilariously deadpan joke". Additionally, Buckley considers the song one of Bowie's best singles.

The song has appeared on several lists of Bowie's greatest compositions. Mojo magazine listed it as Bowie's 11th greatest song in 2015. In a 2016 list ranking every Bowie single from worst to best, Ultimate Classic Rock placed "Golden Years" at number 11, calling it "a taste of [the album's] brilliance". In 2018, the staff of NME placed the track at number 16 in a list of Bowie's 40 best songs. Two years later, Tom Eames of Smooth Radio listed it as Bowie's 13th greatest song. That same year, The Guardian's Alexis Petridis voted the track number 14 in his list of Bowie's 50 greatest songs, describing it as, "A moment of straightforward joy amid the complex, troubled emotional terrain of Station to Station."

== Live performances and subsequent releases ==
"Golden Years" was played sporadically by Bowie on his 1976 Isolar tour. According to Thomas Jerome Seabrook, this was because Bowie struggled to sing it. The song later made regular appearances on the 1983 Serious Moonlight, 1990 Sound+Vision, and 2000 Mini tours. Live performances of the song from the Serious Moonlight tour and Glastonbury Festival appear in Serious Moonlight (1983) and Glastonbury 2000 (2018), respectively.

"Golden Years" has appeared on several compilation albums, including Changesonebowie (1976), The Best of Bowie (1980), Changesbowie (1990), The Singles Collection (1993), The Best of David Bowie 1974/1979 (1998), Best of Bowie (2002), The Platinum Collection (2006), Nothing Has Changed (2014), and Legacy (The Very Best of David Bowie) (2016). In 2016, the song was remastered, along with its parent album, as part of the Who Can I Be Now? (1974–1976) box set. The song's single edit was also included on Re:Call 2, part of that set. A new remix of the song by DJ Tokimonsta was released as a digital single in May 2023.

== Cover versions and appearances in media ==
In February 1976, English comedians Peter Glaze and Jan Hunt covered "Golden Years" for the BBC children's television series Crackerjack!. Pegg describes this rendition as "unquestionably the most peculiar version – and a strong contender for the most bizarre rendition of a Bowie song ever performed". British R&B group Loose Ends covered the song on their 1985 album So Where Are You?. American singer Marilyn Manson later covered the song for the 1998 film Dead Man on Campus, while James Murphy of LCD Soundsystem, who remixed Bowie's 2013 track "Love Is Lost" and collaborated with him on his final album Blackstar (2016), recorded a version for the 2014 film While We're Young.

The song has appeared in several films and soundtracks, including on Trainspotting #2: Music from the Motion Picture, Vol. #2 (1997). An instrumental version of Bowie's original played during the closing credits of the American limited series Stephen King's Golden Years (1991), while the standard track was featured on the original soundtrack of Brian Helgeland's 2001 film A Knight's Tale. The song appeared in a new remix by Bowie's longtime collaborator Tony Visconti, where it gradually replaces the medieval soundtrack as, in Pegg's words, "a courtly farandole develops into a disco freak-out". Cultural critic Anthony Lane praised the film's use of "Golden Years," calling it "the best and most honest use of anachronism that I know of".

== Personnel ==
According to biographer Chris O'Leary:

- David Bowie – lead and backing vocals, handclaps, melodica, Moog synthesiser, producer
- Carlos Alomar – lead and rhythm guitar
- Earl Slick – lead and rhythm guitar
- George Murray – bass
- Dennis Davis – drums, vibraslap
- Warren Peace – percussion, backing vocals
- Harry Maslin – producer

== Charts ==
=== Weekly charts ===
1975–1976 weekly chart performance for "Golden Years"
| Chart (1975–1976) | Peak position |
|---|---|
| Australia (Kent Music Report) | 34 |
| Belgium (Ultratop 50 Flanders) | 10 |
| Belgium (Ultratop 50 Wallonia) | 28 |
| Canada Top Singles (RPM) | 17 |
| France (IFOP) | 54 |
| Ireland (IRMA) | 9 |
| Italy (FIMI) | 8 |
| Netherlands (Dutch Top 40) | 6 |
| Netherlands (Single Top 100) | 6 |
| New Zealand (Listener) | 18 |
| Sweden (Sverigetopplistan) | 10 |
| UK Singles (OCC) | 8 |
| US Billboard Hot 100 | 10 |
| US Cash Box Top 100 | 12 |

2016 weekly chart performance for "Golden Years"
| Chart (2016) | Peak position |
|---|---|
| France (SNEP) | 193 |

=== Year-end charts ===
Year-end chart performance for "Golden Years"
| Chart (1976) | Position |
|---|---|
| Belgium (Ultratop Flanders) | 100 |
| Canada Top Singles (RPM) | 144 |
| Netherlands (Dutch Top 40) | 58 |
| Netherlands (Single Top 100) | 61 |
| US Billboard Hot 100 | 33 |

== Certifications ==
Certifications and sales for "Golden Years"
| Region | Certification | Certified units/sales |
|---|---|---|
| New Zealand (RMNZ) | Gold | 15,000^{‡} |
| United Kingdom (BPI) | Silver | 200,000^{‡} |
^{‡} Sales+streaming figures based on certification alone.
