= Station to Station =

1976 studio album by David Bowie

Studio album by David Bowie
- Released: 23 January 1976
- Recorded: September–November 1975
- Studios: Cherokee, Hollywood; Record Plant, Los Angeles
- Genres: Art rock; funk; R&B
- Length: 37:54
- Label: RCA Victor
- Producers: David Bowie; Harry Maslin

David Bowie chronology
Young Americans (1975)	Station to Station (1976)	Changesonebowie (1976)

Singles from Station to Station
- 1. "Golden Years" Released: 21 November 1975; 2. "TVC 15" Released: 30 April 1976; 3. "Stay" Released: July 1976

Alternative cover
- 1991 reissue cover

Station to Station is the tenth studio album by the English musician David Bowie, released on 23 January 1976 through RCA Records. Regarded as one of his most significant works, the album was the vehicle for Bowie's performance persona the Thin White Duke. Co-produced by Bowie and Harry Maslin, Station to Station was mainly recorded at Cherokee Studios in Los Angeles in late 1975, after Bowie completed shooting the film The Man Who Fell to Earth; the cover art featured a still from the film. During the sessions, Bowie was suffering from various drug addictions, most prominently cocaine, and subsequently stated that he recalled almost nothing of the production.

The commercial success of his previous release, Young Americans (1975), allowed Bowie greater freedom when he began recording his next album. The sessions established the lineup of guitarist Carlos Alomar, bassist George Murray and drummer Dennis Davis that Bowie used for the rest of the decade, and also featured contributions by guitarist Earl Slick and pianist Roy Bittan. Musically, Station to Station was a transitional album for Bowie, developing the funk and soul of Young Americans while presenting a new direction influenced by German krautrock, particularly bands such as Neu! and Kraftwerk. The lyrics reflected Bowie's preoccupations with Friedrich Nietzsche, Aleister Crowley, mythology and religion.

Preceded by the single "Golden Years", Station to Station was a commercial success, reaching the top five on the UK and US charts. After scrapping a soundtrack for The Man Who Fell to Earth, Bowie supported the album with the Isolar Tour in early 1976, during which he attracted controversy with statements suggesting support for fascism. At the end of the tour, he moved to Europe to remove himself from L.A.'s drug culture. The styles explored on Station to Station culminated in some of Bowie's most acclaimed work with the Berlin Trilogy over the next three years. Positively received by music critics on its release, Station to Station has appeared on several lists of the greatest albums of the 1970s and of all time. It has been reissued multiple times and was remastered in 2016 as part of the Who Can I Be Now? (1974–1976) box set.

== Background ==
I paid with the worst manic depression of my life. My psyche went through the roof, it just fractured into pieces. I was hallucinating 24 hours a day...I felt like I'd fallen into the bowels of the earth.

— Bowie on his cocaine addiction

David Bowie developed a cocaine addiction in the summer of 1974, following the release of the album Diamond Dogs. His decaying mental state was depicted in Alan Yentob's documentary Cracked Actor. Bowie later said in a 1987 interview: "I was so blocked ... so stoned ... I'm amazed I came out of that period, honest[ly]. When I see that now I cannot believe I survived it. I was so close to really throwing myself away physically, completely." After seeing an advanced screening of the film in early 1975, the director Nicolas Roeg contacted Bowie to discuss a role in his upcoming adaptation of Walter Tevis's 1963 novel The Man Who Fell to Earth. Bowie accepted the role and moved from New York to Los Angeles, California, to shoot the film.

On his arrival in L.A., Bowie stayed with Deep Purple's bassist Glenn Hughes. He also visited his old friend, singer Iggy Pop, in rehab. (Note: Bowie and Pop met in 1971 and became friends. Bowie was hired to mix Pop's band the Stooges' 1973 album Raw Power. Pop succumbed to drug addiction soon after its release, causing them to drift apart.) The two attempted to record some material in May 1975, but the sessions were unproductive due to Pop's heroin addiction. Hughes told the biographer Marc Spitz that Bowie lived in an increasingly paranoid state, recalling he refused to use elevators because of his fear of heights. His addiction severed friendships with the musicians Keith Moon, John Lennon and Harry Nilsson; he later said: "If you really want to lose all your friends and all of the relationships that you ever held dear, [cocaine is] the drug to do it with."

According to the biographer David Buckley, Bowie's diet now consisted primarily of red and green peppers, milk and cocaine. Bowie later admitted that he only weighed about 80 pounds and was "zonked out of his mind most of the time". Hughes said Bowie did not sleep for "three to four days at a time". Stories, mostly from one interview—pieces of which found their way into Playboy and Rolling Stone—circulated of the singer living in a house full of ancient Egyptian artefacts, burning black candles, seeing bodies fall past his window, having his semen stolen by witches, receiving secret messages from the Rolling Stones, and living in morbid fear of the Led Zeppelin guitarist Jimmy Page. In an interview with Melody Maker in 1977, Bowie described living in L.A.: "There's an underlying unease... You can feel it in every avenue... I've always been aware of how dubious a position it is to stay here for any length of time." Three years later, he told NME that the city "should be wiped off the face of the earth". Shooting for The Man Who Fell to Earth began in June 1975.

== Development ==
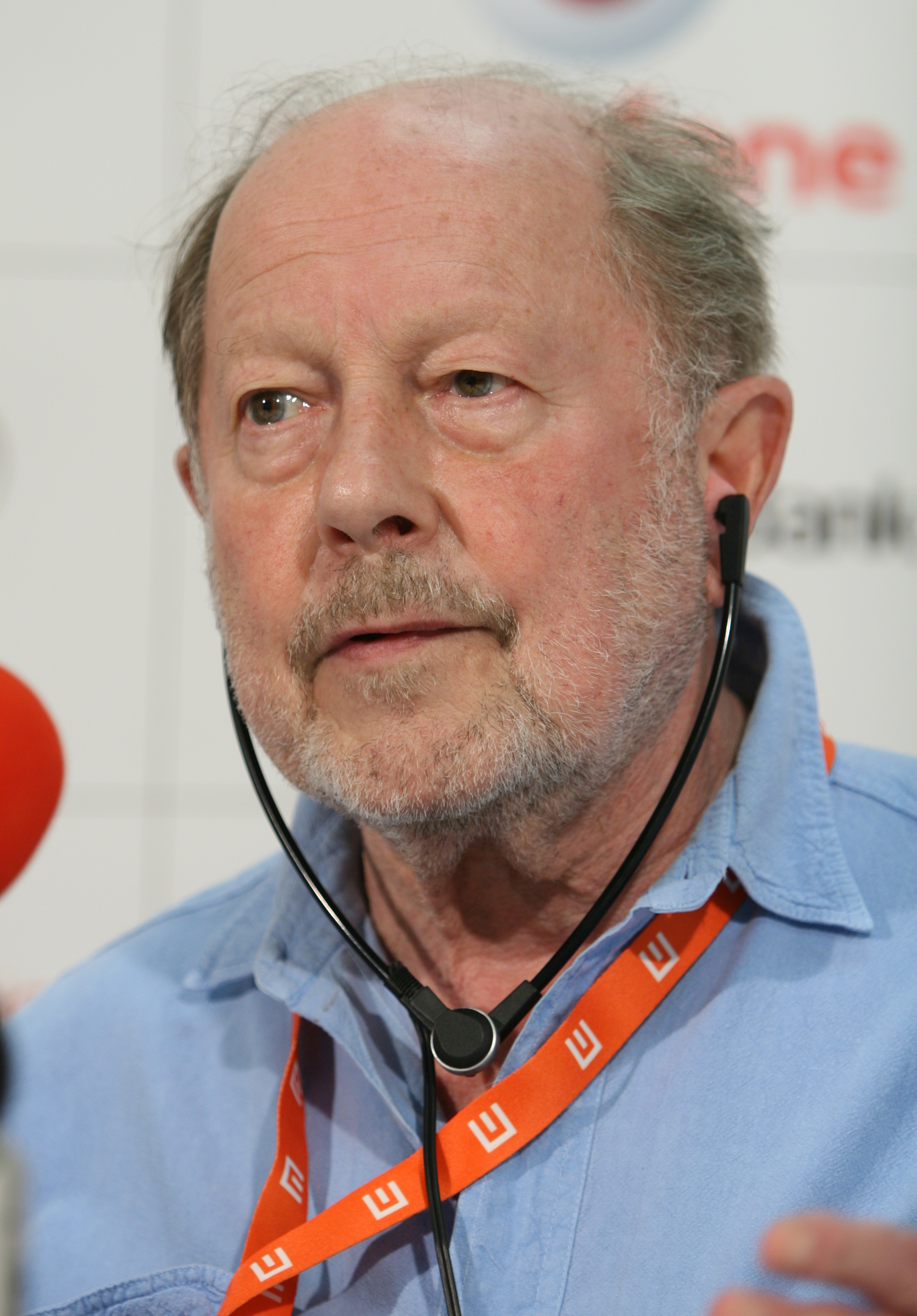
Before recording Station to Station, Bowie starred in The Man Who Fell to Earth, directed by Nicolas Roeg (pictured in 2008). Bowie's work on the film partially inspired the album.

Bowie's heavy drug use continued during filming. He recalled in 1993: "My one snapshot of that film is not having to act...Just being me as I was perfectly adequate for the role. I wasn't of this earth at that particular time." While shooting in New Mexico, he was reported to be in a much healthier state compared to his time in Los Angeles. During his days off from filming, he began writing a collection of short stories called The Return of the Thin White Duke, which he described as "partly autobiographical, mostly fiction, with a deal of magic in it;" he also recalled taking "400 books" for the shoot. He began writing songs throughout filming, including two—"TVC 15" and "Word on a Wing"—that ended up on his next album. He was also in line to compose the film's soundtrack.

In the film, Bowie portrays the lead role of Thomas Jerome Newton, an alien who travels to Earth in search of materials for his dying planet, eventually becoming corrupted by humans. Roeg warned the star that the part of Newton would likely remain with him for some time after the filming. With Roeg's agreement, Bowie developed his own look for the film, and this carried through to his public image over the next twelve months, as did Newton's air of fragility and aloofness. Newton served as a major influence on Bowie's next onstage character, the Thin White Duke.

Bowie's 1975 single "Fame", a collaboration with John Lennon, was a massive commercial success, topping the charts in the US. Bowie's label RCA Records were eager for a follow-up. After completing his work on The Man Who Fell to Earth in September, he returned to Los Angeles; his assistant Coco Schwab had recently acquired a house for him. Partly because of his drug addiction, his marriage to his wife, Angie, began falling apart. After recording backing vocals for Keith Moon's "Real Emotion", he was ready to record his next album.

== Production ==
=== Studio and personnel ===
Station to Station was recorded primarily at Cherokee Studios in Hollywood, Los Angeles. The studio opened in January 1975 and quickly became one of the city's busiest studios, attracting artists such as Rod Stewart and Frank Sinatra. Cherokee was more advanced than Philadelphia's Sigma Sound Studios, where Bowie had recorded Young Americans (1975); it featured five studio rooms, 24-track mixing consoles, 24-hour session times, more space and a lounge bar. On arriving at Cherokee, Bowie sang a few notes in Studio One, played a piano chord, and said: "This will do nicely." Producer Harry Maslin said the studio was chosen because it was new and quiet, with less paparazzi and media attention. With a more advanced studio and no time constraints, experimentation became the ethos of the sessions.

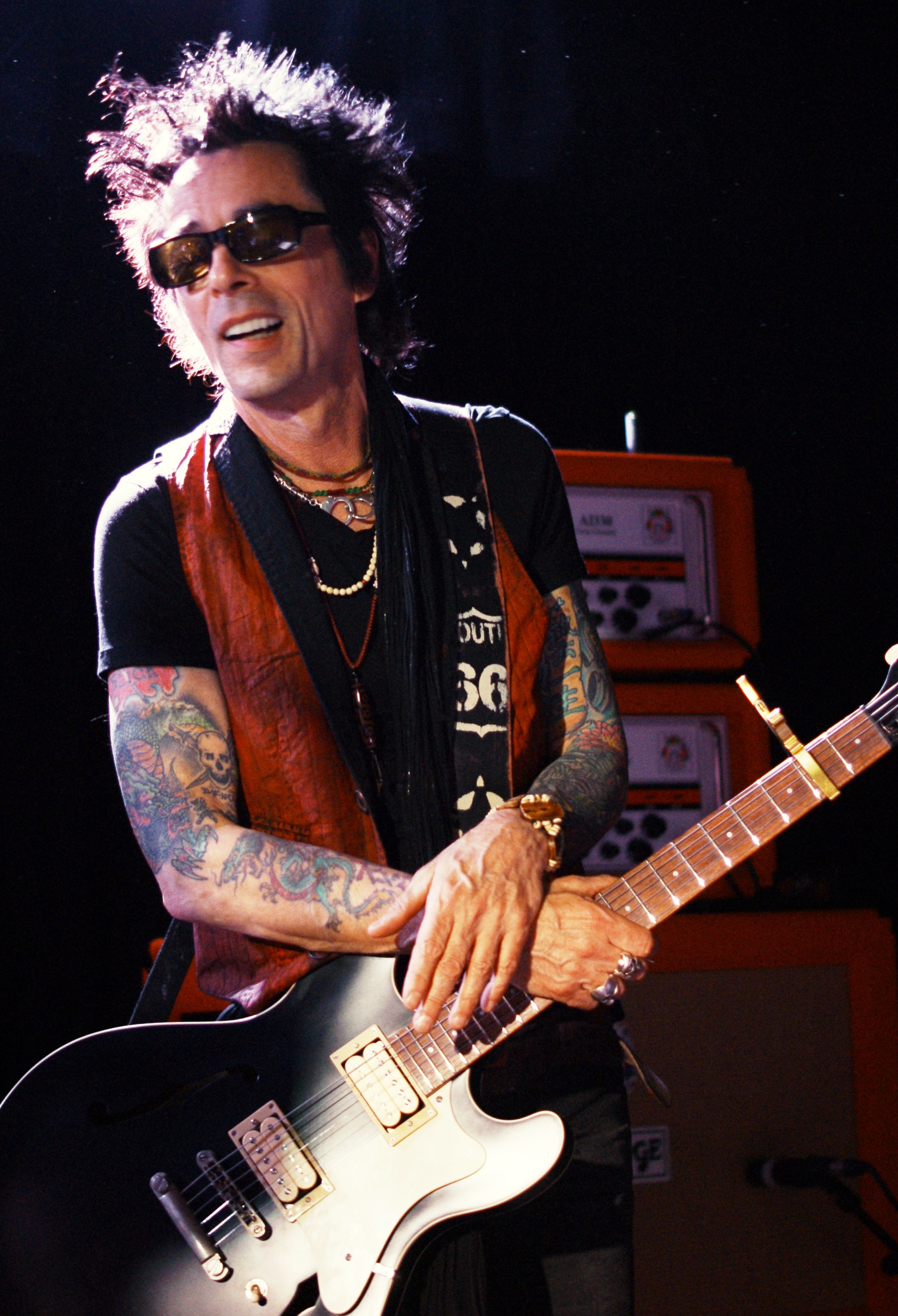
Earl Slick (pictured in 2011) played lead guitar on Station to Station, having previously played on Young Americans.

Several personnel from the Young Americans sessions returned for Station to Station. These included Maslin (who co-produced "Fame" and "Across the Universe" on the former record), guitarists Carlos Alomar and Earl Slick, drummer Dennis Davis and Bowie's old friend Geoff MacCormack (then known as Warren Peace). George Murray, a player from Weldon Irvine's group, was recruited as bassist. Bowie used the rhythm section of Alomar, Murray and Davis for the rest of the decade. Tony Visconti (who, after a three-year absence, returned to the Bowie fold to mix Diamond Dogs and co-produce David Live and Young Americans) was not involved because of conflicting schedules. In mid-October, pianist Roy Bittan of Bruce Springsteen's E Street Band joined the ensemble at Slick's suggestion. Bittan recalled: "David knew we were coming to town and he wanted a keyboard player. It must have only been about three days. It's one of my favourite projects I've ever worked on." Bowie praised Bittan's contributions following the departure of Mike Garson. (Note: Bowie attributed Garson's dismissal to his joining the Church of Scientology. Garson, who had been Bowie's pianist since Aladdin Sane (1973), was reportedly told by Bowie in 1974 that he wanted him to be his pianist "for the next 20 years". He did not rejoin Bowie's entourage until Black Tie White Noise (1993).)

Although NME editors Roy Carr and Charles Shaar Murray surmised it was cut "in 10 days of feverish activity", more recent scholarship contends that the album was recorded over a period of about two months, with the sessions beginning in late September or early October 1975 and ending in late November. Initial working titles for the album included The Return of the Thin White Duke and Golden Years, named after the first track recorded. According to O'Leary, "Golden Years", which Bowie began writing before he began filming The Man Who Fell to Earth, was completed in ten days and issued as a single while the album was still being finished. Recording for "TVC 15" began shortly after the completion of "Golden Years".

A cover of "Wild Is the Wind", written by Dimitri Tiomkin and Ned Washington and first performed by Johnny Mathis in the 1957 film of the same name, was recorded during the sessions. Bowie was inspired to record it after he met Nina Simone, who had recorded her own version of the song in 1966. He recalled in 1993: "Her performance of ["Wild Is the Wind"] really affected me. I thought it was just tremendous, so I recorded it as an homage to Nina." A guest during the sessions was Frank Sinatra, who praised Bowie's recording of "Wild Is the Wind". His feedback prompted Bowie to include it as the album's closing track. While he had begun writing "Word on a Wing" during filming, both "Stay" and the title track were written and recorded entirely in the studio. The three tracks were composed throughout October and November, rather than in one quick rush. Slick stated: "He had one or two songs written, but they were changed so drastically that you wouldn't know them from the first time anyway, so he basically wrote everything in the studio."

=== Recording process ===
I think he's far more advanced than the average producer. He knows a great deal about technical things. He doesn't know everything, he's not an engineer, but he knows more about arranging a song, he knows more about how to relate to people and get what he wants out of them... If you listen to the rhythms specifically on this album, there are very strange things going on rhythmically between all the instruments... If nothing else, David's a genius when it comes to working out rhythmic feels. He was the mainstay behind it all.

— Harry Maslin on Bowie's role as a producer, 1976

For previous albums, Bowie had maintained a relatively straightforward recording process. He arrived at the studio with tracks that were fully written and rehearsed, recorded at a brisk pace, and the sessions concluded quickly. With the massive commercial success of Young Americans, and a reissue of "Space Oddity" (1969) becoming his first UK number-one single, Bowie did not feel compelled to rush the process in L.A. He arrived at Cherokee with fragments of songs rather than finished compositions, changing them as recording progressed. He then gave the ideas to Alomar, who worked on the arrangements with Murray and Davis. After the backing tracks came saxophone, keyboard and lead guitar overdubs, followed by vocal tracks, ending with production effects. Bowie used this new process for the rest of the decade. Alomar recalled, "It was one of the most glorious albums that I've ever done ... We experimented so much on it". Maslin added, "I loved those sessions because we were totally open and experimental in our approach." Slick contributed numerous guitar effects throughout the sessions. According to Bowie, "I got some quite extraordinary things out of Slick. I think it captured his imagination to make noises on guitar, and textures, rather than playing the right notes." Both Slick and Maslin praised Bowie's "on-the-spot approach". Slick found the lack of rehearsals advantageous, resulting in a cleaner performance.

Because of his heavy cocaine use, Bowie recalled remembering "only flashes" of the album's production, later admitting that "I know it was in LA because I've read it was". According to Buckley, Bowie's only memory of the sessions was "standing with Earl Slick in the studio and asking him to play a Chuck Berry riff in the same key throughout the opening of 'Station to Station'." Bowie was not alone in his use of cocaine during the sessions; Alomar recalled that "if there's a line of coke which is going to keep you awake till 8 a.m. so that you can do your guitar part, you do the line of coke ... the coke use is driven by the inspiration". Like Bowie, Slick had only vague memories of the recording: "That album's a little fuzzy—for the obvious reasons! We were in the studio and it was nuts—a lot of hours, a lot of late nights." Pegg says there were several 24-hour non-stop sessions; one day, work began at 7 a.m. and ended at 9 a.m. the next day. According to Spitz, Bowie moved a bed into the studio at one point. On one day, recording moved to the nearby Record Plant because Cherokee was already booked and Bowie did not want to lose momentum. Maslin recalled: "[Bowie] liked to work four days or so, very strenuous hours, and then take a few days off to rest and get charged up for another sprint." Cherokee co-owner Bruce Robb told Spitz: "I'd come in the following day and they were all still working from the night before. I'd leave and they were still working."

=== Mixing ===
When mixing Station to Station, Maslin found using the 24-track mixing consoles a challenge, but they allowed flexibility. Richard Cromelin of Circus writes that having a large number of tracks allowed Maslin to "waste" a channel on one sound effect which could then be "tampered with", leaving other tracks for use by double-tracked instruments and vocals. Bowie later expressed regret that he "compromised in the mixing. I wanted to do a dead mix ... All the way through, no echo ... I gave in and added that extra commercial touch. I wish I hadn't." Speaking to Creem magazine in 1977, Bowie proclaimed that the album was "devoid of spirit ... Even the love songs are detached, but I think it's fascinating."

== Musical style ==
Station to Station is often cited as a transitional album in Bowie's career. Developing the funk, disco and soul sound of Young Americans, the album also reflects the influences of electronic music and the German music genre of krautrock, particularly by bands such as Neu! and Kraftwerk. Bowie had exhibited avant-garde elements on the 1973 tracks "Aladdin Sane (1913–1938–197?)" and "Time". According to Robert Christgau, Bowie's experimentation with African-American music styles had matured by the time he recorded Station to Station, as the record appropriated them "in a decidedly spacy and abrasive context"; he said it added soul to the "mechanical, fragmented, rather secondhand elegance" explored on Aladdin Sane (1973). Initial reviews of Station to Station considered it a "dance" album.

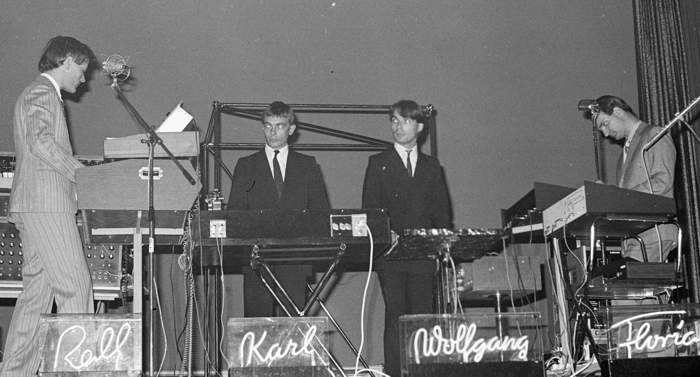
German electronic bands such as Kraftwerk (pictured in 1976) influenced the music on Station to Station.

As a whole, reviewers have classified Station to Station's music as "glacial, synthesized funk-rock", "avant-garde art-rock", space rock, "a hybrid of electronic R&B", "eerie avant-pop", "art-funk", and "ice-funk". AllMusic's Stephen Thomas Erlewine writes it includes "everything from epic ballads and disco to synthesized avant pop" while extending "the detached plastic soul of Young Americans to an elegant, robotic extreme". Chris Randle of The Village Voice labeled the album "robotic R&B". Maslin told Circus magazine: "There was no specific sound in mind. I don't think [Bowie] had any specific direction as far as whether it should be R&B, or more English-sounding, or more commercial or less commercial. I think he went out more to make a record this time than to worry about what it was going to turn out to be." Bowie remarked in 1999 that the music on the album has a "certain charismatic quality to it ... that really eats into you".

The ten-minute title track has been described as heralding "a new era of experimentalism" for Bowie. The song is split into two parts: a slow, hypnotic march, introduced by a noise resembling a train—created by Slick on guitar using flangers and delay effects—before it abruptly changes to what Alan Light of Rolling Stone calls a "celebratory groove", which lasts for the rest of the track. Pitchfork and Rolling Stone defined the track as a "momentous prog-disco suite" and a "Krautrock disco opus" respectively. With its krautrock influence, it is the album's clearest foretaste of Bowie's subsequent Berlin Trilogy.

The musical style of both "Golden Years" and "Stay" are built on the funk and soul of Young Americans but with a harsher, grinding edge. Bowie said the "Golden Years" was written for, and rejected by, American singer Elvis Presley, while Angie Bowie claimed it was penned for her. According to Pegg, the song lacks the "steelier musical landscape" of the rest of the album. Author James Perone argues "Stay" represents a merger of hard rock and blue-eyed funk. "TVC 15", the album's most upbeat track, has been compared to the music of the English rock band the Yardbirds. "Wild Is the Wind" contains funky elements in its electric guitar playing, while the rhythm section and acoustic guitar add a jazz flavour. AllMusic's Donald A. Guarisco likens the music of "Word on a Wing" to gospel and soul; Perone compares it to the sound of American musician Roy Orbison. Both tracks have been categorised as hymns and ballads.

== Lyrics and themes ==
While living in his cocaine-induced, paranoid state, Bowie did not sleep for days, often reading books one after the other. During a run-in with Jimmy Page in February 1975, Page discussed the works of the English occultist Aleister Crowley with him. Bowie, whose tracks "Oh! You Pretty Things" and "Quicksand" from 1971's Hunky Dory had exhibited occult influences, immersed himself in Crowley's works. He revisited concepts seen in Hunky Dory and The Man Who Sold the World's "The Supermen" (1970) such as German philosopher Friedrich Nietzsche's theory of Übermensch, or "Superman", and studied new concepts such as Nazi fascination with Holy Grail mythology and the Kabbalah. Bowie used all these ideas throughout Station to Station, with Pegg describing the album's theme as a clash of "occultism and Christianity".

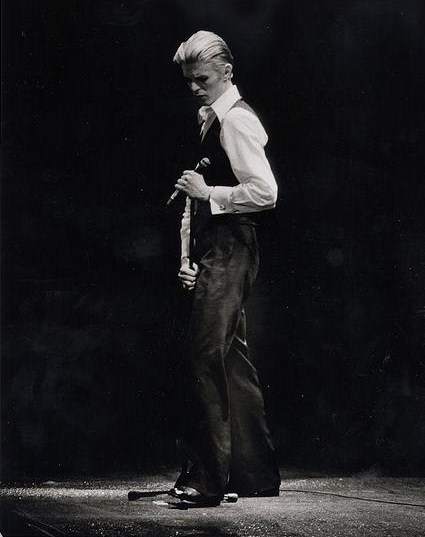
Bowie in character as the Thin White Duke, who became the mouthpiece for Station to Station.

The title track introduces Bowie's new persona—the Thin White Duke—who became the mouthpiece for Station to Station and often during the next six months, for Bowie himself. The character, inspired by Thomas Jerome Newton, dressed impeccably in a white shirt, black trousers and waistcoat. Carr and Murray described him as a hollow man who sang songs of romance with an agonised intensity, yet felt nothing, "ice masquerading as fire", exuberantly "throwing darts in lovers' eyes". Commentators have labelled the persona "a mad aristocrat", "an amoral zombie", and "an emotionless Aryan superman". For Bowie himself, the Duke was "a nasty character indeed".

Despite the noise of a train in the opening moments, Bowie said the title of "Station to Station" does not refer so much to railway stations as to the Stations of the Cross, the series of 14 images depicting Christ's path to his crucifixion, each symbolising a stopping-point for prayer. He added it was about the Kabbalistic Tree of Life, evident in the line "from Kether to Malkuth", which bookend the Tree of Life: "so for me the whole album was symbolic and representative of the trip through the Tree of Life". Pegg believes the song displays a combination of Christian and Jewish allusions. The song refers to William Shakespeare's play The Tempest. Fixation with the occult was evident in such phrases as "white stains", the name of a book of poetry by Crowley. Cocaine is also referenced directly in the line: "It's not the side effects of the cocaine / I'm thinking that it must be love."

Spitz interprets Station to Station as "an album of love songs", specifically "the kind you write when you have no love in your own life". Indeed, Perone considers "Golden Years" the type of love song that does not feature the word "love". The song's character assures his companion that he will always protect her no matter what and promises her a brighter future. Carr and Murray write it carries "an air of regret for missed opportunities and past pleasures". The lyrics of "Stay" have been interpreted as reflecting on "the uncertainty of sexual conquest", and as an example of "the Duke's spurious romanticism".

Religious themes, as well as belief in spirituality, are prevalent on "Station to Station", "Word on a Wing", "Golden Years" and "TVC 15"; for Carr and Murray religion, like love, was simply another way for the Duke to "test his numbness". Bowie has claimed that on "Word on a Wing", at least, "the passion is genuine". There is a comedic flavour in "TVC 15", which multiple commentators describe as a "surreal comedy". It concerns a character's girlfriend being eaten by a television. The song was inspired by a dream of Iggy Pop's featuring a similar premise, as well as a scene in The Man Who Fell to Earth where Newton fills a room with television screens, each tuned to a different channel. Pegg calls it the album's "odd man out".

== Artwork and packaging ==
The album cover is a black-and-white photograph taken by Steve Schapiro on the set of the film The Man Who Fell to Earth, in which Bowie, as Newton, steps into the space capsule that will return him to his home planet. Bowie had insisted on the cropped monochrome image, feeling that in the original coloured full-size image the sky looked artificial; an all-white border was placed around the image, which Pegg believes reflects the "stark monochrome aesthetic" of both the Thin White Duke character and the 1976 tour. He also contends that the monochrome cover matches the "austere tone" of the album. The full-size, colour version was used for some subsequent reissues of the album. The back cover's photograph was taken in Los Angeles in 1974, also by Schapiro, and showed Bowie sketching the Kabbalah Sephirot with chalk. It was Bowie's first LP not to include lyric sheets in the packaging, which was criticised in contemporary reviews by Street Life and NME.

== Promotion and release ==
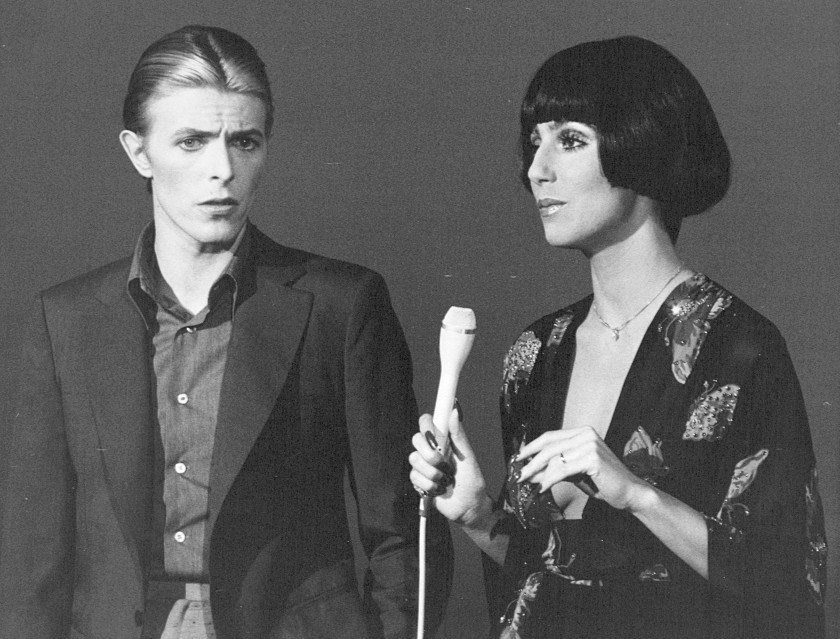
Bowie performing with Cher on the variety show The Cher Show, November 1975

RCA released "Golden Years" as the album's lead single on 21 November 1975, with the Young Americans track "Can You Hear Me?" as the B-side. On 4 November, Bowie appeared on the American television show Soul Train, miming to "Fame" and the then-unreleased "Golden Years". Bowie was the second white artist to appear on the programme, after Elton John six months earlier. During the performance and interview, he was visibly drunk and, according to Pegg, was at a "new low in coherency". Bowie later felt ashamed for his behaviour, recalling in 1999 that he had failed to learn the new single and was scolded afterwards by the show's DJ. The resulting film clip was used as an unofficial music video to promote the single worldwide. Commercially, "Golden Years" reached the top ten in the UK and the US but, like "Rebel Rebel" had been for Diamond Dogs, it was a somewhat unrepresentative teaser for its parent album.

Following Soul Train, Bowie appeared on The Cher Show on 23 November, performing "Fame" and a duet of "Can You Hear Me?" with Cher. He then appeared via satellite on ITV's Russell Harty Plus five days later. On 3 January 1976, Bowie and his band appeared on Dinah! and performed "Stay", marking the song's public debut. RCA released Station to Station on 23 January, with the catalogue number APLI 1327. It was a commercial success, peaking at number three on the US Billboard Top LPs & Tape chart, and remaining on the chart for 32 weeks. It became Bowie's highest-charting album in the US until The Next Day, which reached number two in 2013. Station to Station was certified gold by the Recording Industry Association of America on 26 February. In the UK, it charted for seventeen weeks, peaking at number five, the last time one of Bowie's studio albums charted lower in his home country than in America. Elsewhere, the album peaked in the top three in Canada, France and the Netherlands, and in the top ten in Australia, Japan, Norway and New Zealand.

The title track was released in France as a 7-inch promotional single in January 1976. It featured a shortened version of the track, lasting just over three-and-a-half minutes, with "TVC 15" as the B-side. "TVC 15" was released in edited form as the second single from the album on 30 April 1976, backed by the Diamond Dogs track "We Are the Dead". Its release coincided with the European leg of the Isolar tour. It peaked at number 33 in the UK. "Stay" was first issued, in its full-length form, as the B-side of "Suffragette City" in the summer of 1976 to promote the Changesonebowie compilation. An edited version was subsequently released in July as an A-side in the US and other territories, backed by "Word on a Wing". It failed to chart. The song, however, did not appear on the compilation. (Changesonebowie was itself packaged as a uniform edition to Station to Station, featuring a black-and-white cover and similar lettering). In November 1981, as Bowie's relationship with RCA was winding down, "Wild Is the Wind" was issued as a single to promote the Changestwobowie compilation. The full-length version of "Golden Years" backed the UK single. Accompanied by a video shot specifically for this release, it peaked at number 24 in the UK and charted for ten weeks.

== Critical reception ==
Station to Station received positive reviews from music critics on its release. Paul Trynka says overall, critics acknowledged that Bowie was exploring new territories. Ian MacDonald noted Bowie's musical growth in Britain's Street Life magazine, recognising it as one of his finest albums up to that point. He believed it was the first album he'd released where it felt he had total control. Writing for NME, Charles Murray praised the music throughout the record, but was critical of Bowie's vocal performance, particularly on "Word on a Wing" and "Wild Is the Wind". Another reviewer for NME found the album "a strange and confusing musical whirlpool where nothing is what it seems", ultimately calling it "one of the most significant albums released in the last five years". The magazine named it the second best album of the year, behind Bob Dylan's Desire. John Ingham of Sounds magazine gave immense praise to the album, naming "Golden Years", "TVC 15" and "Stay" some of Bowie's best songs up to that point and overall "a great record of our time". Musically, he viewed it as a cross between The Man Who Sold the World and Young Americans. Some reviewers found the lyrics' meaning difficult to comprehend, with Ingham citing "TVC 15" as an example. However, he felt it was part of the LP's charm.

In America, Billboard felt Bowie had "found his musical niche" with songs like "Fame" and "Golden Years" but that "the 10-minute title cut drags". Rolling Stone writer Teri Moris applauded the album's 'rockier' moments but discerned a move away from the genre, finding it "the thoughtfully professional effort of a style-conscious artist whose ability to write and perform demanding rock & roll exists comfortably alongside his fascination for diverse forms ... while there's little doubt about his skill, one wonders how long he'll continue wrestling with rock at all". Critic Dave Marsh was extremely negative, calling it "the most significant advance in LP filler since Lou Reed's Metal Machine Music [1975]". Considering "Word on a Wing" the "only complete success" on the LP, he panned the tracks as overlong, unexciting and uninteresting, further arguing that "it's rather appalling that the best thing [Bowie] can think of doing with his talent currently is fool around."

Rock critic Lester Bangs, who had generally assessed Bowie's previous work negatively, praised Station to Station in Creem magazine, noting the presence of "a wail and throb that won't let up" and "a beautiful, swelling, intensely romantic melancholy" and calling it Bowie's "(first) masterpiece". In Circus, Cromelin, noting that Bowie was "never one to maintain continuity in his work or in his life", declared that Station to Station "offers cryptic, expressionistic glimpses that let us feel the contours and palpitations of the masquer's soul but never fully reveal his face". Cromelin also found allusions to earlier Bowie efforts, such as the "density" of The Man Who Sold the World, the "pop feel" of Hunky Dory, the "dissonance and angst" of Aladdin Sane, the "compelling percussion" of Young Americans, and the "youthful mysticism" of "Wild Eyed Boy from Freecloud", concluding that "it shows Bowie pulling out on the most challenging leg of his winding journey". Ben Edmonds did not find the LP one of Bowie's best works in Phonograph Record instead believing that Station to Station was merely a "stopping place" where he could reflect and plan his next steps. However, he noted the album's overall cohesiveness and praised the backing band, which he considered Bowie's finest since the Spiders from Mars.

Station to Station was voted the 13th best album of 1976 in the Pazz & Jop, an annual poll of American critics nationwide, published by The Village Voice. Reviewing the record for the newspaper, Robert Christgau expressed some reservations about the length of the songs and the detached quality of Bowie's vocals, but deemed "TVC 15" his "favorite piece of rock and roll in a very long time" and wrote, "spaceyness has always been his shtick, and anybody who can merge Lou Reed, disco, and Dr. John ... deserves to keep doing it for five minutes and 29 seconds". He ranked it as the year's fourth best in his ballot for the poll.

== Subsequent events ==
With the Station to Station sessions completed in December 1975, Bowie started work on a soundtrack for The Man Who Fell to Earth with Paul Buckmaster, whom Bowie worked with for Space Oddity (1969), as his collaborator. Bowie expected to be wholly responsible for the film's music but found that "when I'd finished five or six pieces, I was then told that if I would care to submit my music along with some other people's ... and I just said 'Shit, you're not getting any of it'. I was so furious, I'd put so much work into it." Notwithstanding, Maslin argued Bowie was "burned out" and could not complete the work in any case. The singer eventually collapsed, admitting later, "There were pieces of me laying all over the floor". When Bowie presented his material for the film to Roeg, the director decided it was unsuitable. He preferred a more folksy sound, although John Phillips (the chosen composer for the soundtrack) described Bowie's contributions as "haunting and beautiful". In the event, only one instrumental composed for the soundtrack saw the light of day, evolving into "Subterraneans" on his next studio album, Low.

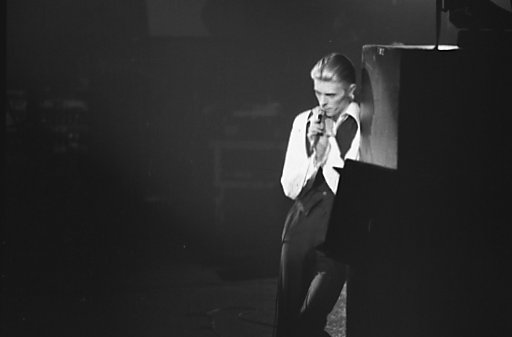
Bowie, in character as the Thin White Duke, on stage during the Isolar Tour in Toronto.

With the soundtrack album abandoned, Bowie decided he was ready to free himself of Los Angeles' drug culture and move back to Europe. In January 1976, he began rehearsals for the Isolar Tour to promote Station to Station, which began on 2 February 1976 and ended on 18 May. Iggy Pop, who, like Bowie, was ready to quit his drug addiction, accompanied him on the tour. (Note: After the tour, the two recorded Pop's debut solo album The Idiot in the summer of 1976 before Bowie began recording his next album, Low.) Due to disagreements with Bowie's management, Stacy Heydon replaced Slick on lead guitar. (Note: Slick later rejoined Bowie on the 1983 Serious Moonlight Tour.) Kraftwerk's "Radioactivity" was used as an overture to the shows, accompanying footage from Luis Buñuel's and Salvador Dalí's surrealist film Un Chien Andalou (1929). The staging featured Bowie, dressed in the Duke's habitual black waistcoat and trousers, a pack of Gitanes placed ostentatiously in his pocket, moving stiffly among "curtains of white light", an effect that spawned the nickname 'the White Light Tour'. In 1989, Bowie reflected, "I wanted to go back to a kind of Expressionist German-film look ... and the lighting of, say, Fritz Lang or Pabst. A black-and-white movies look, but with an intensity that was sort of aggressive. I think for me, personally, theatrically, that was the most successful tour I've ever done." The Isolar Tour was the source of one of the artist's best-known bootlegs, culled from an FM radio broadcast of his 23 March 1976 concert at Nassau Coliseum. A live album, Live Nassau Coliseum '76, was officially released years later.

Bowie drew criticism during the tour for his alleged pro-fascist views. In a 1974 interview, he had declared, "Adolf Hitler was one of the first rock stars ... quite as good as Jagger ... He staged a country", but managed to avoid condemnation. On the Isolar Tour, however, a series of incidents attracted publicity, starting in April 1976 with his detention by customs in Eastern Europe for possession of Nazi memorabilia. The same month in Stockholm, he was quoted as saying that "Britain could benefit from a fascist leader". Bowie blamed his addictions and the Thin White Duke persona for his lapses in judgment. The controversy culminated on 2 May 1976, shortly before the tour ended, in the so-called 'Victoria Station incident' in London, when Bowie arrived in an open-top Mercedes convertible and apparently gave a Nazi salute to the crowd that was captured on film and published in NME. Bowie claimed that the photographer simply caught him in mid-wave, a contention backed by a young Gary Numan who was among the crowd that day: "Think about it. If a photographer takes a whole motor-driven film of someone doing a wave, you will get a Nazi salute at the end of each arm-sweep. All you need is some dickhead at a music paper or whatever to make an issue out it ...".

== Influence and legacy ==
[Station to Station] effectively divides the '70s for David Bowie. It ties off the era of Ziggy Stardust and plastic soul, and introduces the first taste of the new music that was to follow with Low.

— Roy Carr and Charles Shaar Murray, 1981

Station to Station was a milestone in Bowie's transition to his late 1970s Berlin Trilogy. (Note: Low, "Heroes" (both 1977) and Lodger (1979).) Pegg calls it the "precise halfway point on the journey from Young Americans to Low". Bowie himself said, "As far as the music goes, Low and its siblings were a direct follow-on from the title track [of Station to Station]". For the Berlin Trilogy, Bowie collaborated with Tony Visconti and former Roxy Music keyboardist and conceptualist Brian Eno. Eno similarly felt that Low was "very much a continuation" of Station to Station, which he called "one of the great records of all time" in 1999. In an interview with Q magazine in 1997, Bowie considered Station to Station a "great, damn good" album, but "extremely dark". Because of his disconnected state during its recording, he heard it as "a piece of work by an entirely different person".

The album has been described as "enormously influential on post-punk". Carr and Murray wrote in 1981: "If Low was Gary Numan's Bowie album, then Station to Station was Magazine's." Ian Mathers of Stylus magazine opined in 2004 that "just as few had anticipated Bowie's approach, few copied it ... for the most part this is an orphaned, abandoned style". Ten years later, NPR's Jem Aswad described the album as "pioneering ice-funk" that "paved the way not only for thousands of artists who were influenced by it, but also for the brilliant wave of experimentation that followed over the next five years: Low, "Heroes" (both 1977), Lodger (1979) and Scary Monsters (and Super Creeps) (1980)".

Bowie's biographers have described Station to Station as one of his greatest records. In his book Strange Fascination, David Buckley calls it a "masterpiece of invention" that "some critics would argue, perhaps unfashionably, is his finest record". He finds Bowie's vocal performance on "Wild Is the Wind" one of the best of his career. Paul Trynka was struck by the album's innovation, noting "a bizarre blend of spritely and monumental themes", and argues it "marks the point at which David Bowie moved from pop musician to phenomenon". Marc Spitz acknowledges Station to Station as a "gigantic creative leap forward", similar to Hunky Dory five years earlier. He praises the record's timeless feel, the performances and the overall atmosphere, and considers it the first new wave record. James Perone cites it as one of the most "structurally coherent and broadly accessible" records of the era. Peter Doggett argues that the new recording process Bowie used on the record allowed him to elevate it into a single unifying vision, as he had encapsulated on Hunky Dory and Ziggy Stardust. Although Bowie used this process for later records such as Lodger and Scary Monsters, Doggett believes these records are more fragmented than cohesive in the manner of Station to Station.

=== Reappraisal ===
Retrospective professional ratings
Review scores
Source	Rating
AllMusic	4.5/5 stars
Blender	4/5 stars
Chicago Tribune	2.5/4 stars
Christgau's Record Guide	A
Encyclopedia of Popular Music	4/5 stars
The Independent	5/5 stars
New Musical Express	8/10
Pitchfork	9.5/10
Q	5/5 stars
The Rolling Stone Album Guide	5/5 stars
Spin	5/5 stars
Spin Alternative Record Guide	10/10

Retrospectively, Station to Station is viewed as one of Bowie's best and most significant works. Erlewine wrote: "It's not an easy album to warm to, but its epic structure and clinical sound were an impressive, individualistic achievement." Alan Light called it both "musically accessible and lyrically elliptical". In the Spin Alternative Record Guide (1995), Rob Sheffield considered Station to Station Bowie's greatest album: "[It's] the album where Major Tom learns to dance, as the slick, robotic onslaught of the Teutonic title track fades into the tricky beats of "Stay" and "Golden Years". In the Velvets-worthy "TVC 15", Major Tom appears as a woman who beams herself to a satellite, leaving poor David stranded on earth. Highly recommended to MUD devotees and computer sex aficionados." Sheffield later deemed it a "space rock masterpiece" in The Rolling Stone Album Guide (2004), writing Bowie had recorded "the most intense music of his life".

In 2010, Paul Morley of the Financial Times praised its cohesiveness calling it a "mesmerising album" that is not only one of Bowie's best, but "maybe" one of rock's greatest. He argued it works as a capsule showing the artist's mentally, and where rock music was, at the time he made it. In a 2013 retrospective for Rock's Backpages, Barney Hoskyns called Station to Station "one of the most impressive of his musical junctions: intense, passionate, focused, surging and urgently funky". In The Guardian, Alex Needham said the album "manages to incorporate almost everything fantastic about pop music" in just six tracks: "it's dramatic, stylish, emotional and danceable".

Like his biographers, critics have acknowledged the album's position in Bowie's overall discography as the transition between the styles of Young Americans and the Berlin Trilogy. Consequence of Sound's Frank Mojica agreed, saying it offers "an intriguing portrait" of an artist's transitional period, while also being an "excellent album in its own right". Michael Gallucci of Ultimate Classic Rock described it as "the moment where his most unabashed commercial move gave way to his most don't-give-a-damn experimental period", arguing the album marked Bowie's transition "from Rock Star to Artist". In a 2013 readers' poll for Rolling Stone, Station to Station was voted Bowie's third best album; the magazine called it a "deeply weird album that just gets better with age". Following Bowie's death in 2016, Ultimate Classic Rock's Bryan Wawzenek listed Station to Station as his fourth greatest album, stating that although he made better albums in the years to follow, "he made this fascinating album first".

=== Rankings ===
Station to Station has frequently appeared on several lists of the greatest albums of all time by multiple publications. In 1995, it was ranked number 21 on Mojo magazine's list of the 100 greatest albums ever made, the highest ranked Bowie album on the list. In 2003, Rolling Stone ranked it number 323 on their list of the 500 greatest albums of all time, 324 on the 2012 revised list, and 52 on the 2020 revised list. In 2026, the magazine named it the fourth best album of 1976 in a list compiling the year's 76 best albums. In 2004, The Observer ranked the album number 80 on its list of the 100 greatest British albums. Vibe magazine placed the album on its list of 100 Essential Albums of the 20th century. In 2013, NME ranked the album 53rd in their list of the 500 Greatest Albums of All Time. Uncut magazine ranked the album 30th on their list of the 200 greatest albums of all time in 2015. A year later, the UK-based Classic Rock magazine ranked the album number five in its list of the 100 Greatest Albums of the 1970s.

English writer Colin Larkin included Station to Station in the second and third edition of his book All Time Top 1000 Albums (1998) at number 305 and 214, respectively. The album was also included in the 2018 edition of Robert Dimery's book 1001 Albums You Must Hear Before You Die.

== Reissues ==
The album has been released several times on CD beginning in 1984 by RCA, with the original black-and-white cover art. The album was rereleased in 1991 by Rykodisc featuring two bonus tracks: live versions of "Word on a Wing" and "Stay"; this reissue charted at number 57 on the UK Albums Chart for one week. A 1999 rerelease from EMI featured 24-bit digitally remastered sound, but lacked bonus tracks. Both rereleases used the original, full-sized colour cover artwork. In 2007, the 1999 remaster of the album was reissued in Japan as part of the "David Bowie Paper Jacket Series", which packaged Bowie's studio albums from Space Oddity through Tin Machine in mini-LP sleeves; this release reverted to the 1976 cover art, which became standard for later reissues.

Station to Station was reissued in 2010 in special and deluxe editions. The special edition included an "original analogue master" of the album (a newly prepared digital master sourced from the original tapes) and the complete 1976 Nassau Coliseum concert on two CDs. The deluxe edition included the special edition's contents, on both vinyl and CD, alongside a disc of single edits and three further versions of the album: a Dolby 5.1 surround sound mix and a new stereo mix, both created by co-producer Harry Maslin (and issued on DVD-Audio), and the 1985 RCA CD master. Both editions were released in September 2010. In The Complete David Bowie, Pegg is critical of Maslin's remix. He writes that it "surrenders all the subtlety of the original [mix] in favour of unimaginatively pushing everything to the front", resulting in a "messy racket", particularly evident in the backing vocals for "TVC 15". Although he notes that there is a different lead vocal take on "Wild Is the Wind", he considers the new mix drastically inferior to the original.

In 2016, the album was remastered for the Who Can I Be Now? (1974–1976) box set, with standalone CD and vinyl releases the following year. The box set included both the original 1976 mix and the 2010 stereo remix of Station to Station (for the first time available in its entirety on CD and vinyl), individually packaged. The sleeve containing the 1976 mix used the original cover art, while the sleeve containing the 2010 mix used a colour-corrected version of the 1991 front cover art; the back cover of the 2010 mix's sleeve was a variant of the 1976 back cover, with burgundy text in place of bright red.

== Track listing ==
All songs written by David Bowie except "Wild Is the Wind", with lyrics by Ned Washington and music by Dimitri Tiomkin.

Side one
No.	Title	Length
1.	"Station to Station"	10:08
2.	"Golden Years"	4:03
3.	"Word on a Wing"	6:00

Side two
No.	Title	Length
4.	"TVC 15"	5:29
5.	"Stay"	6:08
6.	"Wild Is the Wind"	5:58

== Personnel ==
Albums credits per the liner notes and biographers Nicholas Pegg, Chris O'Leary, & Benoît Clerc:

- David Bowie – vocals; acoustic guitar, effects (1), melodica (1, 2), synthesisers, handclaps (2), Chamberlin (3), alto & tenor saxophone (4), Minimoog, Mellotron (5)
- Carlos Alomar – rhythm guitar (1–5), lead guitar (2, 4, 5), acoustic guitar (6)
- Earl Slick – lead guitar; rhythm guitar (1, 2, 4)
- George Murray – bass guitar
- Dennis Davis – drums; percussion (1–3, 5)
- Roy Bittan – piano (1, 3, 4), organ (1)
- Warren Peace – backing vocals (1–4), percussion (2, 3, 5)
- Harry Maslin – effects, vibraphone (1), synthesisers (2), baritone sax (4)

Production

- David Bowie – producer
- Harry Maslin – producer, recording, mix and mastering engineer
- Ted Spencer – assistant mix engineer
- Steve Shapiro – photography

== Charts ==
=== Weekly charts ===
1976 weekly chart performance for Station to Station
Chart (1976)	Peak Position
Australian Albums (Kent Music Report)	8
Canadian Albums (RPM)	2
Dutch Albums (MegaCharts)	3
Finnish Albums (Suomen virallinen lista)	24
French Albums (SNEP)	3
Italian Albums (Musica e dischi)	15
Japanese Albums (Oricon)	6
New Zealand Albums (RIANZ)	9
Norwegian Albums (VG-lista)	8
Swedish Albums (Sverigetopplistan)	11
UK Albums (OCC)	5
US Billboard Top LPs & Tape	3

1991 weekly chart performance for Station to Station
Chart (1991)	Peak Position
UK Albums (OCC)	57

2010–17 weekly chart performance for Station to Station
Chart (2010–17)	Peak Position
Austrian Albums (Ö3 Austria)	47
German Albums (Offizielle Top 100)	91
Hungarian Albums (MAHASZ)	38
Irish Albums (IRMA)	49
Italian Albums (FIMI)	64
Swiss Albums (Schweizer Hitparade)	65

2021–26 weekly chart performance for Station to Station
Chart (2021–26)	Peak position
Scottish Albums (OCC)	8
Croatian International Albums (HDU)	1

=== Year-end charts ===
1976 year-end chart performance for Station to Station
Chart (1976)	Position
Australian Albums (Kent Music Report)	58
Canadian Albums (RPM)	86
Dutch Albums (MegaChart])	30
French Albums (SNEP)	53
US Billboard Top LPs & Tape	51

== Certifications and sales ==
Certifications for Station to Station
Region	Certification	Certified units/sales
Canada (Music Canada)	Gold	50,000^{^}
United Kingdom (BPI)	Gold	100,000^{*}
United States (RIAA)	Gold	500,000^{^}
Summaries
Worldwide	—	3,400,000
^{*} Sales figures based on certification alone.^{^} Shipments figures based on certification alone.
