= Isolar – 1976 Tour =

1976 concert tour by David Bowie

- Tour by David Bowie
- Poster with the West German tour dates
- Location: North America; Europe
- Associated album: Station to Station
- Start date: 2 February 1976
- End date: 18 May 1976
- Legs: 2
- No. of shows: 65 (66 scheduled)

David Bowie concert chronology
- Diamond Dogs Tour (1974); Isolar – 1976 Tour (1976); Isolar II – The 1978 World Tour (1978)

The Isolar – 1976 Tour was a concert tour by the English singer-songwriter David Bowie, in support of the album Station to Station. It opened on 2 February 1976 at the Pacific Coliseum, Vancouver, and continued through North America and Europe, concluding at the Pavillon de Paris in Paris, France, on 18 May 1976. The tour is commonly referred to as Thin White Duke Tour, The Station to Station Tour, and The White Light Tour.

== History ==
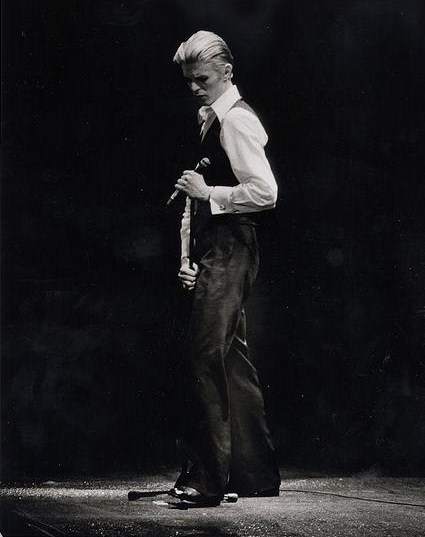
Bowie performs at Maple Leaf Gardens, Toronto, 26 February 1976.

The performances began without introduction with a showing of the 1928 surrealist film by Luis Buñuel and Salvador Dalí, Un Chien Andalou, which includes a famous section of a razor blade cutting into a woman's eyeball. Bowie appeared on stage immediately as the film finished, while the audience was still disoriented. The visual element of the performances incorporated banks of fluorescent white light set against black backdrops creating a stark spectacle on a stage largely devoid of props or other visual distractions.

The Public Auditorium, Cleveland, Ohio performance on 28 February 1976 was recorded by a concert-goer and released as the bootleg entitled NeoExpressionism on the TSP (The Swingin' Pig) label. It would be digitally re-mastered in 2007 and the entire set released on 2 CDs. The only song not done at this performance is "Sister Midnight."

The Nassau Veterans Memorial Coliseum, Uniondale, New York, performance on 23 March 1976 was recorded by RCA Records with extracts broadcast by The King Biscuit Radio Network. Two songs from the performance were later included on the 1991 Rykodisc re-issue of the Station to Station album. The entire Nassau performance is available on the 2010 deluxe edition of Station to Station as well as the 2016 box set Who Can I Be Now? (1974–1976). It was released separately on LP, CD and digitally in February 2017 as Live Nassau Coliseum '76.

Tour keyboardist Tony Kaye has soundboard recordings of the 26 March 1976 Madison Square Garden and 17-18 May Pavillon de Paris shows, and has expressed hope that they might eventually be released.

Bowie took friend and fellow musician Iggy Pop along as his companion on the tour. Following a March 21, 1976, show, Bowie and Pop were arrested together for marijuana possession in Rochester, New York, although charges were later dropped.

== Title ==
The tour has been described under numerous different names. Although officially referred to as the Isolar tour, it has also been given the names the Thin White Duke tour, the Station to Station tour, and the White Light Tour. According to biographer Nicholas Pegg, the word "Isolar" is an anagram of "sailor", one of Bowie's favourite words. Isolar also derives from the company Bowie launched to handle music publishing after his acrimonious split with MainMan Publishing. Bowie himself later clarified: "Isola is Italian for island. Isolation plus Solar equals Isolar. If I remember correctly, I was stoned."

== Set list ==
This set list is representative of the performance on 7 May 1976 in London, UK, at Empire Pool. It does not represent all concerts for the duration of the tour.

1. "Station to Station"
2. "Suffragette City"
3. "Fame"
4. "Word on a Wing"
5. "Stay"
6. "I'm Waiting for the Man"
7. "Queen Bitch"
8. "Life on Mars?
9. "Five Years"
10. "Panic in Detroit"
11. "Changes"
12. "TVC 15"
13. "Diamond Dogs"

Encore

14. "Rebel Rebel"
15. "The Jean Genie"

== Tour dates ==
Date	City	Country	Venue	Attendance	Revenue
North America
2 February 1976	Vancouver	Canada	Pacific Coliseum		
3 February 1976	Seattle	United States	Seattle Center Coliseum		
4 February 1976	Portland	United States	Portland Memorial Coliseum		
6 February 1976	Daly City	United States	Cow Palace		
8 February 1976	Inglewood	United States	The Forum		
9 February 1976	Inglewood	United States	The Forum		
11 February 1976	Inglewood	United States	The Forum		
13 February 1976	San Diego	United States	San Diego Sports Arena		
15 February 1976	Phoenix	United States	Arizona Veterans Memorial Coliseum		
16 February 1976	Albuquerque	United States	Albuquerque Civic Auditorium		
17 February 1976	Denver	United States	McNichols Sports Arena		
20 February 1976	Milwaukee	United States	MECCA Arena		
21 February 1976	Kalamazoo	United States	Wings Stadium		
22 February 1976	Evansville	United States	Roberts Municipal Stadium		
23 February 1976	Cincinnati	United States	Riverfront Coliseum		
25 February 1976	Montreal	Canada	Montreal Forum		
26 February 1976	Toronto	Canada	Maple Leaf Gardens		
27 February 1976	Cleveland	United States	Public Auditorium		
28 February 1976	Cleveland	United States	Public Auditorium		
29 February 1976	Detroit	United States	Olympia Stadium		
1 March 1976	Detroit	United States	Olympia Stadium		
3 March 1976	Chicago	United States	International Amphitheatre		
5 March 1976	St. Louis	United States	Kiel Auditorium		
6 March 1976	Memphis	United States	Mid-South Coliseum	11,673	$85,015
7 March 1976	Nashville	United States	Nashville Municipal Auditorium	7,700	$51,000
8 March 1976	Atlanta	United States	Omni Coliseum		
9 March 1976	Jacksonville	United States	Jacksonville Coliseum		
11 March 1976	Pittsburgh	United States	Civic Arena		
12 March 1976	Norfolk	United States	Norfolk Scope		
13 March 1976	Landover	United States	Capital Centre		
14 March 1976	Landover	United States	Capital Centre		
15 March 1976	Philadelphia	United States	The Spectrum	36,000	$260,000
16 March 1976	Philadelphia	United States	The Spectrum	36,000	$260,000
17 March 1976	Boston	United States	Boston Garden		
19 March 1976	Buffalo	United States	Buffalo Memorial Auditorium	12,000	$87,235
20 March 1976	Rochester	United States	Rochester Community War Memorial	8,358	$58,720
21 March 1976	Springfield	United States	Springfield Civic Center	6,752	$46,572
22 March 1976	New Haven	United States	New Haven Coliseum		
23 March 1976	Uniondale	United States	Nassau Veterans Memorial Coliseum		
26 March 1976	New York City	United States	Madison Square Garden		
Europe
7 April 1976	Munich	West Germany	Olympiahalle		
8 April 1976	Düsseldorf	West Germany	Philipshalle		
10 April 1976	West Berlin	West Germany	Deutschlandhalle		
11 April 1976	Hamburg	West Germany	Congress Center Hamburg		
12 April 1976	Hamburg	West Germany	Congress Center Hamburg		
13 April 1976	Frankfurt	West Germany	Festhalle Frankfurt		
14 April 1976	Ludwigshafen	West Germany	Friedrich-Ebert-Halle		
17 April 1976	Zürich	Switzerland	Hallenstadion		
24 April 1976	Helsinki	Finland	UKK Hall		
26 April 1976	Stockholm	Sweden	Kungliga Tennishallen		
27 April 1976	Stockholm	Sweden	Kungliga Tennishallen		
28 April 1976	Gothenburg	Sweden	Scandinavium		
29 April 1976	Copenhagen	Denmark	Falkonersalen		
30 April 1976	Copenhagen	Denmark	Falkonersalen		
3 May 1976	London	England	Empire Pool		
4 May 1976	London	England	Empire Pool		
5 May 1976	London	England	Empire Pool		
6 May 1976	London	England	Empire Pool		
7 May 1976	London	England	Empire Pool		
8 May 1976	London	England	Empire Pool		
11 May 1976	Brussels	Belgium	Forest National		
13 May 1976	Rotterdam	Netherlands	Rotterdam Ahoy		
14 May 1976	Rotterdam	Netherlands	Rotterdam Ahoy		
17 May 1976	Paris	France	Pavillon de Paris		
18 May 1976	Paris	France	Pavillon de Paris		
Total

=== Cancellations and rescheduled shows ===
14 April 1976	Ludwigshafen, West Germany	Friedrich-Ebert-Halle	Cancelled.
17 April 1976	Bern, Switzerland	Festhalle Bea Bern Expo	Rescheduled to Hallenstadion in Zurich.
27 April 1976	Oslo, Norway	Ekeberghallen	Cancelled.
19 May 1976	Paris, France	Pavillon de Paris	Cancelled.

== Songs ==
From Hunky Dory

- "Changes"
- "Life on Mars?"
- "Queen Bitch"

From The Rise and Fall of Ziggy Stardust and the Spiders from Mars

- "Five Years"
- "Suffragette City"

From Aladdin Sane

- "Panic in Detroit"
- "The Jean Genie"

From Diamond Dogs

- "Diamond Dogs"
- "Rebel Rebel"

From Young Americans

- "Fame" (Bowie, John Lennon, Carlos Alomar)

From Station to Station

- "Station to Station"
- "Golden Years"
- "Word on a Wing"
- "TVC 15"
- "Stay"

Other songs

- "I'm Waiting for the Man" (originally from The Velvet Underground & Nico (1967) by The Velvet Underground and Nico, written by Lou Reed; outtake from various Bowie sessions 1966-72)
- "Sister Midnight" (from The Idiot by Iggy Pop; written by Pop, Bowie and Alomar)

== Personnel ==
Band ("Raw Moon")

- David Bowie – Vocals, guitar, saxophone
- Carlos Alomar – Rhythm guitar, music director, backing vocals
- Stacey Heydon – Lead guitar, backing vocals
- George Murray – Bass guitar, backing vocals
- Dennis Davis – Drums, percussion
- Tony Kaye – Keyboards

Crew

- Vern Moose Constan, Rob Joyce – Band technicians/personnel
- Lonnie McKenzie, Leroy Kerr, Lester Burton, Buddy Prewitt, Larry Sizemore – Lighting technicians/personnel
- Buford Jones, Scott Wadsworth – Sound technicians/personnel
