= Station to Station (song) =

1976 song by David Bowie

- Label of the French promotional single

Song by David Bowie

from the album Station to Station
- Released: 23 January 1976
- Recorded: September–November 1975
- Studio: Cherokee, Los Angeles
- Genre: Art rock; progressive rock; disco; krautrock
- Length: 10:14 (album version); 3:40 (French single)
- Label: RCA
- Songwriter: David Bowie
- Producers: David Bowie; Harry Maslin

"Station to Station" is a song by the English musician David Bowie. It was released in January 1976 as the title track and opener of his tenth studio album Station to Station and in edited form as a promotional 7-inch single in France the same month. Co-produced by Bowie and Harry Maslin, it was written and recorded in Los Angeles between September and November 1975. At over 10 minutes in length, it is Bowie's longest studio recording. Opening with a train-like noise, the song's first half is a slow march, while the second, in a different key and tempo than the first, is influenced by progressive rock and disco. It has been characterised as art rock and is influenced by the German electronic bands Kraftwerk and Tangerine Dream.

Lyrically, the song introduces Bowie's sinister persona the Thin White Duke, who became the mouthpiece for Station to Station and often the embodiment of Bowie himself. During the recording, Bowie was heavily dependent on drugs such as cocaine, which is referenced directly throughout. "Station to Station" also makes references to Kabbalah, occultism, gnosticism, paranoia and other fixations that affected Bowie's mind at the time. The opening sound effect is a red herring meant to represent the Stations of the Cross, along with a juncture connecting two different stages of his career; it combined the funk and soul influences of his previous album Young Americans with the experimental sound he would explore on his subsequent Berlin Trilogy.

"Station to Station" has received acclaim from music critics and biographers. Retrospectively, it has been named one of Bowie's greatest songs and, like its parent album, an indicator of where his career was heading at the time. He performed the track throughout the 1976 Isolar Tour in support of Station to Station, often in character as the Thin White Duke, and on various subsequent tours. It was remastered, along with its parent album, as part of the box set Who Can I Be Now? (1974–1976) in 2016.

== Composition ==
I got some quite extraordinary things out of Earl Slick. I think ["Station to Station"] captured his imagination to make noises on guitar, and textures, rather than playing the right notes.

— David Bowie discussing Earl Slick's contributions to "Station to Station"

"Station to Station" was recorded at Cherokee Studios in Los Angeles between September and November 1975. According to Emily Barker of NME, Bowie "starved his body of all nutrients (besides milk, red peppers, and cocaine)" during the sessions. Bowie later stated that he could not remember recording the album at all: "I have only flashes of making it." Author David Buckley states that Bowie's only memory of the sessions was "standing with [lead guitarist] Earl Slick in the studio and asking him to play a Chuck Berry riff in the same key throughout the opening of 'Station to Station'."

At over 10 minutes in length, "Station to Station" is Bowie's longest studio recording. Structurally, the song builds from a droning, guitar-driven introductory portion that mimics a train building up speed. Following the train noise, the band begins to enter, with percussion and keyboards playing chords in and out of key, after which the groove begins. The opening section consists of a 6/4 A minor measure, followed by 4/4 one over F and G, before returning to 6/4. Author Peter Doggett describes the section as a "slow, hypnotic instrumental march". The march lasts for more than three minutes before Bowie begins his vocals. After several verses, at the five-minute mark, a thud of drums signals a change of tempo and key and the band erupts into what Alan Light of Rolling Stone calls a "celebratory groove", which lasts for the rest of the track. Doggett likens this section to the work of the progressive rock bands Genesis and Jethro Tull. Like the album, the entire song encompasses art rock.

The train sound effect was created by Slick using flanging and delay effects. The noise moves from right to left across the stereo channels before fading into guitar feedback from Slick, which Doggett likens to it "disappearing into a tunnel". According to Nicholas Pegg, the effect "acknowledges" the influence of the 1974 album Autobahn by the German electronic band Kraftwerk, which begins with the sound of a car starting up and driving across the stereo field. Pegg believes another influence is from Edgar Froese of the German electronic band Tangerine Dream, whom Bowie befriended during his time in West Berlin (1977–1979); Froese's 1975 album Epsilon in Malaysian Pale also begins with a train sound effect. However, he notes that the train is a red herring in that it expresses what Bowie later called "the album's 'wayward spiritual search'". More specifically, it reinstates the "travelling metaphor" of earlier compositions: "the stations recall the 'new surroundings' of "Rock 'n' Roll with Me" [from Diamond Dogs], and the "mountains on mountains" reprise the questing motifs of "Wild Eyed Boy from Freecloud" [from David Bowie (1969)] and The Man Who Sold the World." Bowie would later state, "the 'Station to Station' track itself is very much concerned with the Stations of the Cross", the series of 14 images depicting Christ's path to his crucifixion, each symbolising a stopping-point for prayer. Stuart Berman of Pitchfork supports this, saying: "the title track's momentous prog-disco suite [...] charts a course from spiritual void toward ecstatic religious reawakening." It has been also described as "Kraut-disco" by Rolling Stone.

Another possible influence on the track is guitarist Jimmy Page of the English rock band Led Zeppelin. Page was a session musician on Bowie's earliest recordings and had been an occasional acquaintance since. During the same time Bowie became dependent on cocaine, Page had become dependent on heroin, which Pegg considered "even more fearful" than Bowie's addiction. Led Zeppelin's Physical Graffiti was released in February 1975, months ahead of the Station to Station sessions. Pegg writes that "Station to Station" echoes "a distinct flavour of the groove, tempo and sense of building tension created by the famous rising riff of Physical Graffiti's standout track 'Kashmir'".

Bowie also credited German krautrock duo Neu! with some influence on the track, especially in "the setting of the aggressive guitar-drone against the almost-but-not-quite robotic/machine drumming of [Klaus] Dinger".

== Lyrics ==
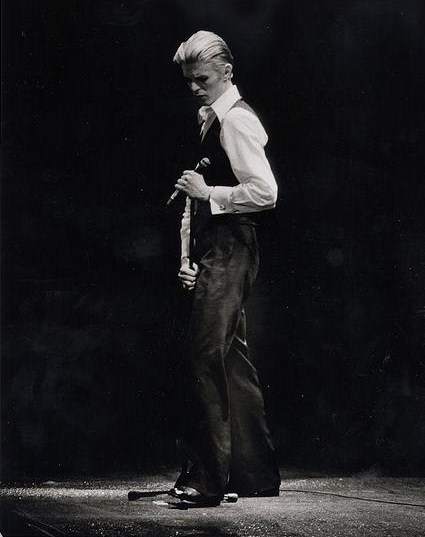
Bowie in character as the Thin White Duke performing on the 1976 Isolar Tour.

"Station to Station" introduces Bowie's persona the Thin White Duke, a sinister figure who became the mouthpiece for Station to Station and often for Bowie himself throughout 1976. This persona was noticeably darker than Bowie's previous characters, being described as "a mad aristocrat", an "amoral zombie", and "an emotionless Aryan superman". For Bowie himself, the Duke was "a nasty character indeed". The lyrics themselves contain very cryptic messages and direct references, including to Kabbalah and gnosticism. In 1997, Bowie stated that "All the references within ["Station to Station"] have to do with the Kabbalah." Doggett believes the main themes of the track are magic; the arts of legendary musicians, both real and fictitious; the Kabbalah's account of progress along the tree of life from Kether to Malkuth; love and cocaine. Doggett further argues: "just as [the Hunky Dory track] "Quicksand" offered a catalogue of avenues open to the inquisitive imagination of David Bowie circa 1971, so "Station to Station" present a more confused medley of the themes that were haunting his nightmares in the final weeks of 1975."

The Duke introduces himself by singing "the return of the Thin White Duke/throwing darts in lovers' eyes." In Thelema, the new religious movement developed by English occultist Aleister Crowley, darts or arrows are interpreted to be a symbol of direction revealing the dynamic of one's True Will. Bowie's fixation on Crowley is evident in such phrases as "white stains", the name of a book of poetry by Crowley, who he previously referred to on "Quicksand". Doggett also argues that aside from the Thin White Duke, another duke was at the heart of the action: Prospero, from William Shakespeare's play The Tempest. He writes that Prospero, like the Thin White Duke, is a "master of magic" who can control elements and cast spells over "lovers' eyes", as Prospero does with his daughter Miranda and her lover Ferdinand.

Once the song's second section begins, the lyrics become brighter. Punctuated by the refrain "It's too late", Bowie enters a landscape of "mountains and sunbirds". The Duke sings of his drug use ("It's not the side effects of the cocaine/I'm thinking that it must be love") in a joyous tone. Light writes that other themes present on the track are "paranoia and odd fixations" that were present in Bowie's mind at the time. At different points Bowie declares "the European canon is here", which Doggett believes is a "pretentious way" of summarising Bowie's interest in Kraftwerk and Brechtian theatre; he also notes that 'canon' could be interpreted "at a stretch" as 'cannon'.

== Release and critical reception ==
"Station to Station" was released as the opening title track to Bowie's tenth studio album of the same name on 23 January 1976. The song was also released as a promotional single, with the catalogue number 42549 A, in January 1976 in France by RCA Records, with a shortened duration of 3:40 and the album track "TVC 15" as the B-side. The single version begins as the song's second section enters, with the drum fill just prior to the "once there were mountains..." lyric. The single edit appears on the 2010 Deluxe Edition of Station to Station and on Re:Call 2, as part of the 2016 box set Who Can I Be Now? (1974–1976). The full track was remastered, along with its parent album, and released on the same box set.

The song has been acclaimed by music critics, who have praised the performance of the band and Bowie himself. Nicholas Pegg described it as "Scintillatingly performed and gorgeously produced and "one of the high watermarks in his studio work." He further praised Bowie's vocal performance and Slick's guitar work. Dave Thompson of AllMusic called Slick's playing "fabulous" and the track as a whole possibly the most "evocative" song Bowie ever wrote. Doggett writes that what saves the track from "utter obscurity" and his audience from "alienation" as a result is the music itself. Alex Needham of The Guardian, in a review declaring Station to Station his favorite album, calls the track "monumental", adding that "Bowie blasts away his immediate Philly soul past and speeds into a more experimental future over 10 totally exhilarating minutes". Needham also found it impressive that the song did not "overshadow" the rest of the album, which he believes shows "how much Bowie was on fire".

In a review of Bowie's live album Glastonbury 2000 in 2018, Sean T. Collins of Pitchfork calls its version of the track a "teutonic-occult behemoth" and a highlight of the album. He felt the main section's "off-kilter groove" and the "barreling braukeller climax" were made for performing live. He continued, "hearing Bowie croon Kabbalistic jargon like 'one magical movement from Kether to Malkuth' to [a] massive crowd serves as a helpful reminder that he remained, even then, one of the weirdest people ever to achieve festival-headlining success". In 2018, the writers of NME listed "Station to Station" as Bowie's 24th greatest song. In a list of Bowie's 50 greatest songs, Alexis Petridis of The Guardian ranked the song third, calling the shift into its second section "possibly the single most thrilling moment in his entire catalogue." In 2021, Rolling Stone ranked it number 400 in their updated list of the 500 Greatest Songs of All Time.

== Legacy ==
Buckley describes "Station to Station" as heralding "a new era of experimentalism" for Bowie. Along with the rest of the album, the song presented the new direction Bowie was taking in his career, from the funk and soul of Young Americans to the experimental sound of his Berlin Trilogy. In 2001, Bowie said, "As far as the music goes, Low and its siblings were a direct follow-on from the title track [of Station to Station]. It's often struck me that there will usually be one track on any given album of mine, which will be a fair indicator of the intent of the following album." Needham from The Guardian similarly writes that with the lyrics "the European canon is here", Bowie fully announces what was to come. Doggett writes: "Here was Bowie's first nod of recognition to the so-called motorik sound of Krautrock, as the ominous, Wagnerian strains of the early segments of the song were succeeded by the propulsive dance rhythms of the finale. Only a churl would have worried that the theme of this cathartic moment was that it was too – suggesting that the spiritual journey might be only just beginning."

== Live versions ==
"Station to Station" was the opening number throughout the 1976 Isolar Tour. A performance from this tour was included on the live album Live Nassau Coliseum '76, which was released as part of the 2010 Deluxe Edition of Station to Station, in the 2016 box set Who Can I Be Now? (1974–1976), and as a standalone album in 2017. The song was subsequently performed on the Stage (1978), Serious Moonlight (1983), Sound+Vision (1990), Summer 2000, and A Reality (2003–2004) tours. Performances from the Stage Tour have been released on Stage (1978) and Welcome to the Blackout (2018). The Stage version was also featured in the Uli Edel film Christiane F. (1981), where Bowie, lip-synching to his 1978 recording, made an appearance as himself performing the song at a concert. An edit of this version was released on the film's soundtrack. A performance from the Serious Moonlight Tour was included on the live album Serious Moonlight (Live '83), which was part of the 2018 box set Loving the Alien (1983–1988) and released as a standalone album in 2019. Bowie's performance of the song at the Glastonbury Festival in June 2000 was released in 2018 on Glastonbury 2000.

== Track listing ==
All songs written by David Bowie.

7" French promotional single

1. "Station to Station" – 3:40
2. "TVC 15" – 4:40

== Personnel ==
According to Chris O'Leary and Benoît Clerc:

- David Bowie – lead and backing vocals, acoustic guitar, sound effects, melodica
- Earl Slick – electric guitar
- Carlos Alomar – electric guitar
- George Murray – bass guitar
- Roy Bittan – piano, organ
- Dennis Davis – drums, percussion
- Warren Peace – backing vocals
- Harry Maslin – sound effects

Technical

- David Bowie – producer
- Harry Maslin – producer, engineer
