= Right (song) =

Song by David Bowie

from the album Young Americans
- A-side: "Fame"
- Released: 7 March 1975
- Recorded: August – November 1974
- Studio: Sigma Sound, Philadelphia, Pennsylvania
- Genre: Blue-eyed soul, funk
- Length: 4:13
- Label: RCA
- Songwriter: David Bowie
- Producer: Tony Visconti

"Right" is a song by the English musician David Bowie from his album Young Americans, released on 7 March 1975. Recorded on 14–18 August and 20–24 November 1974 at Sigma Sound Studios in Philadelphia, "Right" is the last of four tracks on side one of Young Americans, and the B-side of the single "Fame", released in August 1975.

== Music and lyrics ==
The repetition of the main lyrics—"Taking it all the right way / Never no turning back"—the prominence of the percussion and bass, and the emphasis on the backing singers made "Right" one of the album's "authentically soulful" songs, according to professor of music Ian Chapman. Chapman describes it as having "no hidden Bowie-esque irony, barb, or angst", although Alex Petridis calls it a "twitchy, agitated note-to-self".

The backing vocalists included Luther Vandross and an old friend and co collaborator on some of Bowie's albums, Geoff MacCormack; it was the only track on Young Americans to feature MacCormack. The call and response between Bowie and the backing singers "lends an air of immaculate sophistication to the lyric's paean to positive thinking", according to Nicholas Pegg. In 1975 Bowie called the song a mantra: "People forget what the sound of Man's instinct is—it's a drone, a mantra. And people say, 'Why are so many things popular that just drone on and on?' But that's the point really. It reaches a particular vibration, not necessarily a musical level."

Toward the end of Alan Yentob's film about Bowie, Cracked Actor (1975), Bowie, Luther Vandross, Robin Clark, and Ava Cherry are seen rehearsing "Right" for the 1974 "Soul Tour", although in the end it was never performed live.

== Personnel ==
According to biographer Chris O'Leary:

- David Bowie – lead vocal
- Carlos Alomar – rhythm guitar
- Mike Garson – clavinet
- David Sanborn – alto saxophone
- Willie Weeks – bass guitar
- Andy Newmark – drums
- Larry Washington – conga
- Luther Vandross, Ava Cherry, Robin Clark, Geoff MacCormack – backing vocals

Technical

- Tony Visconti – producer
- Carl Paruolo – engineer

== Cover ==
In 2021, Thai-funk trio Khruangbin recorded a cover of "Right" for the David Bowie tribute compilation Modern Love, released by Barely Breaking Even (BBE) Music. Modern Love featured reinterpretations of Bowie deep cuts by 17 artists.

== See also ==
- List of songs recorded by David Bowie
