= Word on a Wing =

1976 song by David Bowie

Song by David Bowie

from the album Station to Station
- Released: 23 January 1976
- Recorded: September–November 1975
- Studio: Cherokee, Los Angeles
- Genre: Blue-eyed soul, art rock
- Length: 6:03
- Label: RCA
- Songwriter: David Bowie
- Producers: David Bowie, Harry Maslin

"Word on a Wing" is a song written and recorded by the English singer-songwriter David Bowie in 1975 for the Station to Station album, where it appears as the closing track of the LP's first side.

Bowie admits that the song was written out of a coke-addled spiritual despair that he experienced while filming The Man Who Fell to Earth. In 1980 Bowie spoke of the song to NME, claiming "There were days of such psychological terror when making the Roeg film that I nearly started to approach my reborn, born again thing. It was the first time I'd really seriously thought about Christ and God in any depth, and 'Word on a Wing' was a protection. It did come as a complete revolt against elements that I found in the film. The passion in the song was genuine... something I needed to produce from within myself to safeguard myself against some of the situations I felt were happening on the film set."

During the time of recording this song Bowie began to wear a silver crucifix given to him by his father, stating in NME in 1980 "I wear it, I'm not sure why I wear it now even. But at the time I really needed this". A Kirlian photograph of this crucifix featured on material for the Station to Station Tour, in art for his 1997 album Earthling, and cover art for "Little Wonder".

== Live versions ==
- A live version recorded at Nassau Coliseum, Long Island on 23 March 1976 was first released as a bonus track on the 1991 Rykodisc CD release of Station to Station. The same performance was included on the album Live Nassau Coliseum '76, which was released as part of the 2010 reissues of the Station to Station album, in the 2016 collection Who Can I Be Now? (1974–1976), and as a stand–alone album in 2017.
- After regular appearances on the Isolar – 1976 Tour, "Word on a Wing" remained under wraps for over twenty years. Bowie revived the song in 1999, initially during his episode of the VH1 Storytellers television music series, when Bowie reaffirmed that the song was a product of "the darkest days of my life... I'm sure it was a call for help," noting that he spent much of 1975-76 pondering such questions as "Do the dead interest themselves in the affairs of the living?" and "Can I change the channel on my T.V. without using the clicker?"

== Other releases ==
- An edit of the song was released as the B-side of the single "Stay" in July 1976. The single version is included on Re:Call 2, part of the Who Can I Be Now? (1974–1976) compilation released in 2016.

== Personnel ==
According to Chris O'Leary:

- David Bowie – lead vocals, chamberlin
- Earl Slick – lead guitar
- Geoff MacCormack – percussion, backing vocals
- Roy Bittan – piano
- George Murray – bass guitar
- Carlos Alomar – rhythm guitar
- Dennis Davis – drums, shaker

Technical

- David Bowie – producer
- Harry Maslin – producer
