= Live Nassau Coliseum '76 =

2017 live album by David Bowie

Live album by David Bowie
- Released: 10 February 2017
- Recorded: 23 March 1976
- Venues: Nassau Coliseum, Uniondale, New York, USA
- Studio: Record Plant Mobile
- Length: 82:58
- Label: Parlophone
- Producer: Harry Maslin

David Bowie chronology
No Plan (2017)	Live Nassau Coliseum '76 (2017)	Cracked Actor (Live Los Angeles '74) (2017)

Live Nassau Coliseum '76 is a live album by David Bowie recorded on 23 March 1976 during Bowie's Isolar Tour in support of the album Station to Station. Recorded live at the Nassau Coliseum in Uniondale, New York, the album captures the penultimate date of the North American leg of the tour.

An edited version of the concert was broadcast on radio's King Biscuit Flower Hour and was heavily bootlegged years before the concert recording's first official release in September 2010, as part of special and deluxe editions of Station to Station. The album was released separately on 10 February 2017. The concert recording's complete 15 tracks are also included in the Who Can I Be Now? (1974–1976) box set.

The official album is a largely complete version of the concert, although "Panic in Detroit" is a shortened version with most of Dennis Davis' drum solo edited out.

== Critical reception ==
Writer Nicholas Pegg described the album as "an excellent memento of one of Bowie’s greatest tours, with highlights including a majestic 'Word On A Wing', an über-cool 'Waiting For The Man', and riotous, thrilling renditions of 'Stay' and 'The Jean Genie'" with "Bowie and his terrific 1976 band on blistering form."

== Track listing ==
All tracks are written by David Bowie, except where noted.

Disc one
No.	Title	Writer(s)	Length
1.	"Station to Station"		11:53
2.	"Suffragette City"		3:31
3.	"Fame"	Bowie; Carlos Alomar; John Lennon	4:02
4.	"Word on a Wing"		6:06
5.	"Stay"		7:25
6.	"Waiting for the Man"	Lou Reed	6:20
7.	"Queen Bitch"		3:12

Disc two
No.	Title	Length
8.	"Life On Mars?"	2:13
9.	"Five Years"	5:03
10.	"Panic in Detroit" (with most of drum solo edited out)	6:03
11.	"Changes" (with band intro)	4:11
12.	"TVC 15"	4:58
13.	"Diamond Dogs"	6:38
14.	"Rebel Rebel"	4:07
15.	"The Jean Genie"	7:28

== Personnel ==
- David Bowie – vocals
- Carlos Alomar – guitar
- Stacey Heydon – guitar
- George Murray – bass
- Tony Kaye – keyboards
- Dennis Davis – drums

Technical

- Dave Hewitt – recording engineer, 1976
- Harry Maslin – producer, mixing engineer
- Mixed at Sweetersongs East Studios, Santa Monica, California, USA in February 2009.
- Brian Gardner – mastering
- Andrew Kent – photography, 1976
- Scott Minshall – artwork

== Chart performance ==
Chart (2017)	Peak position
Belgian Albums (Ultratop Flanders)	83
Belgian Albums (Ultratop Wallonia)	147
