= The Thin White Duke =

David Bowie persona from 1975 to 1976

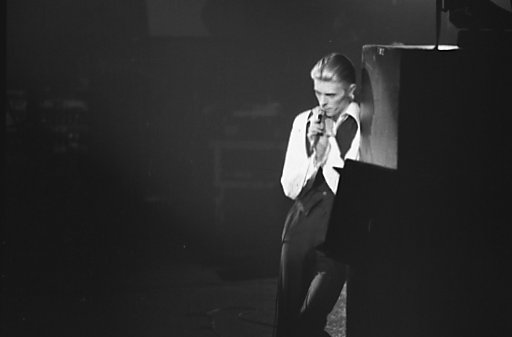
- David Bowie as the Thin White Duke in Toronto, February 1976
- First appearance: 1975
- Last appearance: 1976
- Created by: David Bowie
- Portrayed by: David Bowie

In-universe information
- Occupation: aristocrat, cabaret performer

The Thin White Duke was the persona and character adopted by the English musician David Bowie for public appearances in the mid-1970s. Though the Duke is primarily identified with Bowie's 1976 album Station to Station and is mentioned by name in the title track, he had first begun to adopt aspects of the persona during the tour supporting his Young Americans album in late 1974. The look and character of the Thin White Duke were also influenced by that of Thomas Jerome Newton, the humanoid alien played by Bowie in the 1976 film The Man Who Fell to Earth (which was filmed in mid-1975).

The Thin White Duke became a controversial figure due to ostensibly pro-fascist statements made by Bowie in press interviews during this period. Soon after making the comments, Bowie said that they were "theatrical" remarks made in character and did not reflect his actual views. In later years, he blamed his erratic behaviour during the mid-1970s on an "astronomical" use of hard drugs (particularly cocaine) while living in Los Angeles. He left California for Europe in late 1976 to improve his mental and physical well-being and settled in West Berlin in early 1977, at which point he retired the Thin White Duke persona.

== Development ==
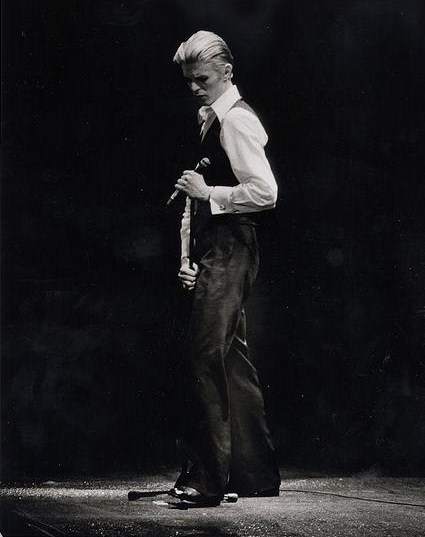
At Maple Leaf Gardens, Toronto, 26 February 1976

David Bowie, who had experience performing in experimental theatre before becoming famous as a musician, began adopting different performing personae in the early 1970s, most notably the glam alien Ziggy Stardust. He famously retired Ziggy in 1973 at the end of the Ziggy Stardust Tour, and adopted the dystopian Halloween Jack persona for his Diamond Dogs album and most of the following tour.

An early version of the Thin White Duke character began to appear in late 1974 during the second leg of the tour. During this "plastic soul" lead-up to his Young Americans album, Bowie's hair was still orange, but it was cut shorter, and his stage costumes moderated from colourful glam outfits to more conventional dress clothes. The Thin White Duke was mentioned by name in the title track of Bowie's next album, Station to Station, and he appeared in that persona during the following Isolar Tour.

Bowie was significantly influenced by writer William S. Burroughs, whom he met in 1973, enthusiastically incorporating his cut-up technique as a method to harness unconscious creative processes. Stark suggests that Burroughs' reference to semen as 'the Thin White Rope' in his 1959 novel Naked Lunch may have influenced the name of the Thin White Duke.

== Characteristics ==
At first glance, the Thin White Duke appeared more conventional than Bowie's previously flamboyant glam incarnations. Sporting well-groomed blonde hair and wearing a simple, cabaret-style wardrobe consisting of a white shirt, black trousers, and a waistcoat, the Duke was a hollow man who sang songs of romance with an agonised intensity while feeling nothing, "dry ice masquerading as fire". The persona has been described as "a mad aristocrat", "an amoral zombie", and "an emotionless Aryan superman". Bowie himself described the character as "A very Aryan, fascist type; a would-be romantic with absolutely no emotion at all but who spouted a lot of neo-romance."

== Controversy ==
In 1975 and 1976, Bowie made statements in interviews about Adolf Hitler and Nazi Germany that some interpreted as being sympathetic to fascism or even pro-fascist. The controversy deepened in May 1976 when, while acknowledging a group of fans outside of London Victoria station, he was photographed making what some alleged to be a Nazi salute. Bowie denied this, saying that he was simply waving to fans and the photographer happened to take the photo while his arm was outstretched.

In an interview with Cameron Crowe published in Playboy in September 1976, Bowie said: "I believe very strongly in fascism. The only way we can speed up the sort of liberalism that's hanging foul in the air at the moment is to speed up the progress of a right-wing, totally dictatorial tyranny and get it over as fast as possible. [...] Television is the most successful fascist, needless to say. Rock stars are fascists, too. Adolf Hitler was one of the first rock stars." These comments provoked substantial outrage and, alongside anti-immigration remarks made by Eric Clapton around the same time, inspired the creation of the Rock Against Racism movement in the United Kingdom.

As early as 1976, Bowie began disavowing his allegedly fascist comments and said that he was misunderstood. In an interview that year in the Daily Express, he explained that while performing in his various characters, "I'm Pierrot. I'm Everyman. What I'm doing is theatre, and only theatre ... What you see on stage isn't sinister. It's pure clown. I'm using myself as a canvas and trying to paint the truth of our time on it. The white face, the baggy pants – they're Pierrot, the eternal clown putting over the great sadness." In 1977, after retiring the Duke, Bowie stated that "I have made my two or three glib, theatrical observations on English society and the only thing I can now counter with is to state that I am not a fascist".

In later years, Bowie called the mid-1970s "the darkest days of my life" due to his "astronomical" usage of cocaine and amphetamines. For much of 1975, he was obsessed with Kabbalah and the work of Aleister Crowley, remained awake for days at a time, and lived on a diet of bell peppers, milk, and hard drugs. He blamed his erratic behaviour and fascinations with Nazism and Western esotericism during his Thin White Duke period on drug-induced paranoia and depression, and claimed that his mental state was such that he had no memory of the recording sessions for Station to Station in the autumn of 1975. "It was a dangerous period for me," he explained. "I was at the end of my tether physically and emotionally and had serious doubts about my sanity." Eventually, he began to see the Thin White Duke as "a nasty character indeed", and later, "an ogre".

== Aftermath ==
In an attempt to salvage his mental and physical health, Bowie left Los Angeles for Europe in late 1976, staying in Geneva for a time before joining his friend Iggy Pop in West Berlin in early 1977. Though he did not publicly retire the Thin White Duke as he had Ziggy Stardust, Bowie did not appear in the persona after leaving California.

Bowie lived in West Berlin for almost two years, during which time he moved on both musically and personally with his "Berlin Trilogy" albums (Low, "Heroes", and Lodger) in collaboration with Brian Eno and Tony Visconti. He also produced Iggy Pop's solo albums The Idiot and Lust for Life.

== See also ==
- Ola Hudson
