= Can You Hear Me? (David Bowie song) =

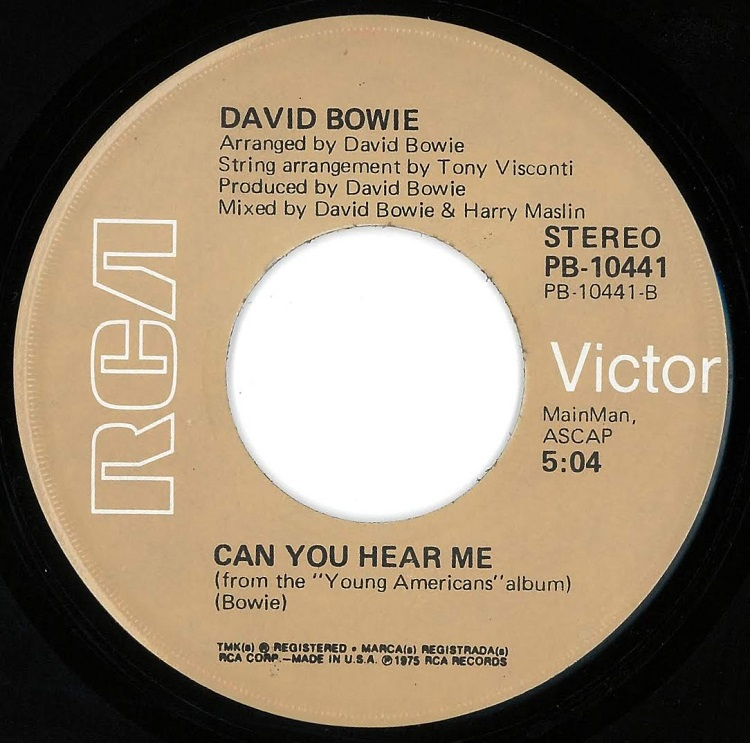

Song by David Bowie

from the album Young Americans
- A-side: "Golden Years"
- Released: November 1975
- Recorded: January – August 1974
- Studio: Olympic, London; Sigma Sound, Philadelphia, Pennsylvania
- Genre: Blue-eyed soul
- Length: 5:04
- Label: RCA
- Songwriter: David Bowie
- Producers: Bowie, Tony Visconti, Harry Maslin

"Can You Hear Me?" is a ballad by the English musician David Bowie from his 1975 album Young Americans. Bowie called it a "real love song", written with someone in mind, but he did not identify them. The song was released as a single in November 1975 on the B side of "Golden Years".

Chris O'Leary writes that "Can You Hear Me?", with its guilt and "studied unease", is "sumptuous, its intro alone masterful": "Once we were lovers / Can they understand? / Closer than others, I was your / I was your man." The alto sax, played by David Sanborn and introduced in the third verse, "becomes a competing vocal line". The arrangement and "small cathedral of voices" obscure the "pathetic man at the heart of the song".

The song was written by Bowie, produced by Bowie, Tony Visconti, and Harry Maslin, and engineered by Carl Paruolo. The backing vocalists included the 24-year-old Luther Vandross at the very beginning of his career.

== Recordings ==
Then known as "Take It In Right", the song was first recorded on 1 January 1974 at Olympic Studios in Barnes, London. As "Can You Hear Me?", it was included in Bowie's soul album The Gouster, recorded in 1974 but released posthumously on the box set Who Can I Be Now? (1974–1976) (2016).

Bowie decided in 1974 to have the Scottish singer Lulu record the song, which they did on 25 March, again at Olympic, and on 17 April at RCA's studio in New York. It was at the New York session that Bowie first met the guitarist Carlos Alomar, who became a major collaborator. Bowie believed that Lulu had the potential to be a great soul singer. "Lulu's got this terrific voice, and it's been misdirected all this time, all these years," he told an interviewer in 1974. "People laugh now, but they won't in two years time, you see! I produced a single with her – 'Can You Hear Me' – and that's more the way she's going. She's got a real soul voice, she can get the feel of Aretha, but it's been so misdirected." He said he wanted take her to Memphis and record an album with her and a band such as Willie Mitchell's. According to Nicholas Pegg, the recording of Lulu singing "Can You Hear Me?" is "one of the lost grails of Bowie fans".

On 13–18 August 1974, Bowie recorded "Can You Hear Me?" at Sigma Sound Studio in Philadelphia for Young Americans. In August 1975, he told Anthony O'Grady, in an interview for New Musical Express: "'Can You Hear Me' was written for somebody but I'm not telling you who it is. That is a real love song. I kid you not."

A live performance recorded on 20 October 1974, during the third leg of Bowie's Diamond Dogs Tour, was released in 2020 on I'm Only Dancing (The Soul Tour 74). Bowie also sang the song live on 23 November 1975 with Cher, on The Cher Show on CBS.

== Personnel ==
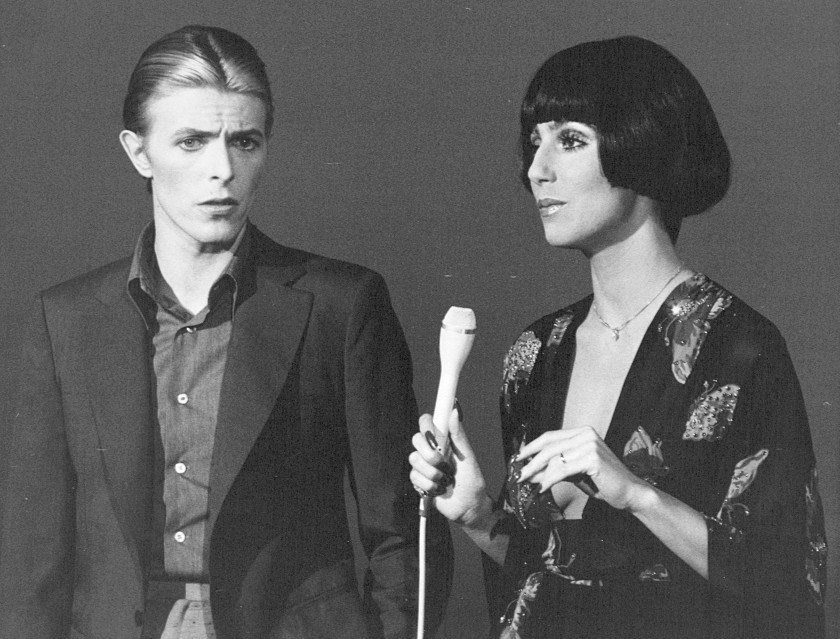
Bowie and Cher sang "Can You Hear Me?" live on 23 November 1975.

According to biographer Chris O'Leary:

- David Bowie – lead vocal
- Carlos Alomar – rhythm guitar
- Mike Garson – piano
- David Sanborn – alto saxophone
- Willie Weeks – bass guitar
- Andy Newmark – drums
- Larry Washington and possibly Pablo Rosario – conga
- Luther Vandross, Ava Cherry, Robin Clark, possibly Diane Sumler and Anthony Hinton – backing vocals
- Unknown musicians – strings
- Tony Visconti – string arrangement

Technical

- David Bowie – producer
- Tony Visconti – producer
- Harry Maslin – producer
- Carl Paruolo – engineer
