= Fame (David Bowie song) =

1975 single by David Bowie

- US reissue single

Single by David Bowie

from the album Young Americans
- B-side: "Right"
- Released: 2 June 1975 (US); 25 July 1975 (UK)
- Recorded: January 1975
- Studio: Electric Lady (New York City)
- Genre: Funk; funk rock; soul
- Length: 4:21 (album version); 3:30 (single version)
- Label: RCA
- Songwriters: David Bowie; Carlos Alomar; John Lennon
- Producers: Harry Maslin; David Bowie

David Bowie singles chronology
"Young Americans" (1975)	"Fame" (1975)	"Golden Years" (1975)

"Fame" is a song by the English singer-songwriter David Bowie. It was released on his ninth studio album Young Americans (1975) and was later issued as the album's second single by RCA Records in June 1975. Written by Bowie, Carlos Alomar and John Lennon, it was recorded at Electric Lady Studios in New York City in January 1975. It is a funk, funk rock and soul song that represents Bowie's dissatisfaction with the troubles of fame and stardom.

The song was a major commercial success in North America, becoming Bowie's first number 1 single on both the US Billboard Hot 100 and the Canadian Singles Chart. The song was one of the most successful singles of the year, ranking at number 8 on the Billboard Year-End Hot 100. However, it was less successful in Europe, reaching number 17 in the UK Singles Chart.

In 1990, Bowie remixed the song under the title "Fame '90" to coincide with his Sound+Vision Tour. "Fame" has since appeared on many compilation albums, and was remastered in 2016 as part of the Who Can I Be Now? (1974–1976) box set.

The song is one of four Bowie songs to be included in The Rock and Roll Hall of Fame's 500 Songs that Shaped Rock and Roll.

== Background ==
With the release of his 1972 album The Rise and Fall of Ziggy Stardust and the Spiders from Mars, Bowie achieved stardom. On that album, Bowie presented his aspirations to become famous in "Star", which also encapsulated the fantasies of "every adolescent dreamer miming into a hairbrush in a suburban bedroom", on top of Bowie's own frustration with not having fulfilled his potential. By the beginning of 1975, "fame" meant a couple of different things to Bowie. It meant not only his stardom, but also impending lawsuits that were the result of the ending of Bowie's relationship with his manager Tony Defries. It also meant an expensive musical theatre project concocted by Defries, titled Fame, that was financed through MainMan, a company that was built around Bowie's fame; the show was an examination of Marilyn Monroe that closed after one night on Broadway and after already flopping off-Broadway. The failure of Fame almost ruined MainMan and was traumatic on Bowie and Defries' relationship.

Bowie would later describe "Fame" as "nasty, angry", and fully admitted that it was written "with a degree of malice" aimed at MainMan. This is supported by biographer Peter Doggett, who writes: "every time in "Fame" that Bowie snapped back with a cynical retort about its pitfalls, he had [Defries] and [Defries's] epic folly in mind," and noted the lyric "bully for you, chilly for me" as the striking example. In 1990, Bowie recalled the song as his "least favourite track on the album" and reflected: "I'd had very upsetting management problems and a lot of that was built into the song. I've left all that behind me, now... I think fame itself is not a rewarding thing. The most you can say is that it gets you a seat in restaurants."

== Composition and recording ==
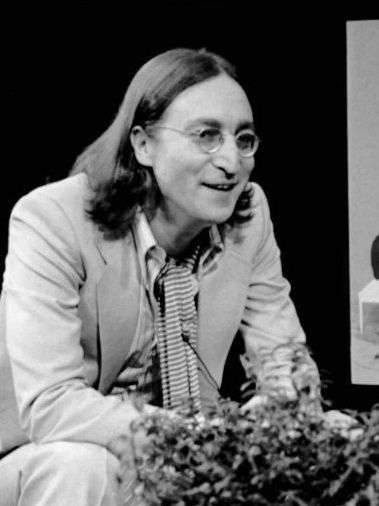
Bowie wrote "Fame" with former Beatle John Lennon, who also contributed backing vocals and guitar.

With the Young Americans sessions mostly concluded by late 1974, the material was delayed while Bowie extricated himself from Defries. Sources differ on how "Fame" came to be in the studio, but both Doggett and Nicholas Pegg write that it was the product of "happy" accidents. By late 1974, Bowie was staying in New York City, where he met John Lennon during his "lost weekend" period of estrangement. Shortly after Lennon reunited with his wife Yoko Ono, the pair jammed together, leading to a one-day session at Electric Lady Studios in January 1975. There, Carlos Alomar had developed a guitar riff for Bowie's cover of "Footstompin'" by the Flares, which Bowie thought was "a waste" to give to a cover. (Note: Alomar's riff was also used for an unreleased cover of Bruce Springsteen's "It's Hard to Be a Saint in the City". Another recording with a different instrumental track would be included on Sound + Vision in 1989.) Lennon, who was in the studio with them, came up with the hook when he started to sing "aim" over the riff, which Bowie turned into "Fame" and thereafter, according to Marc Spitz, wrote the rest of the lyrics to the song with Lennon. However, according to Doggett, Lennon made the "briefest lyrical contributions" that was "enough" to give him co-writing credit. Bowie later said that Lennon was the "energy" and the "inspiration" for "Fame", and that's why he received a co-writing credit. Lennon stated in a 1980 interview: "We took some Stevie Wonder middle eight and did it backwards, you know, and we made a record out of it!"

After the group solidified the riff, they emerged with something that was in the hand of "black American music" at the start of 1975: a "cousin" of "Hollywood Swinging" by Kool & the Gang, "The Payback" by James Brown, and "Do It ('Til You're Satisfied)" by B. T. Express. (Later in 1975, Brown released the song "Hot (I Need to Be Loved, Loved, Loved)", whose main riff was borrowed directly from "Fame"). Doggett writes that other potential influences were the 1972 song "Jungle Walk" by the Rascals and the 1974 songs "Pick Up the Pieces" by the Average White Band and "Brighter Day" by Keith Christmas, a friend of Bowie's. Overall, Doggett believes "Fame" resembled "Thank You (Falettinme Be Mice Elf Agin)" by Sly and the Family Stone which, like "Fame", is in the funk style with "viciously pointed" lyrics.

"Fame" is a funk, funk rock and soul song, representing Bowie's (and Lennon's) dissatisfaction with the troubles of fame and stardom, including "money-grabbing managers, mindless adulation, unwanted entourages and the hollow vacuity of the limousine lifestyle". Lennon's voice is heard interjecting the falsetto "Fame" throughout the song. Along with "Fame", Bowie worked with Lennon again when he decided to record a cover of Lennon's Beatles song "Across the Universe"; Lennon played rhythm guitar on the cover. According to Spitz, "Fame" and "Across the Universe" were both last-minute additions to Young Americans. Although Young Americans was mostly co-produced by Tony Visconti, he was not present at the sessions for "Fame"; instead, both songs were co-produced by engineer Harry Maslin. In the song, Bowie sings "What you need, you have to borrow" with, according to Spitz, the same "venom" that Jimi Hendrix sang, "Businessmen they drink my wine," on his cover of Bob Dylan's "All Along the Watchtower".

== Release and reception ==
"Fame" was released on 7 March 1975 as the final track on Bowie's ninth studio album Young Americans. It was subsequently released by RCA Records (as PB 10320) as the second single from the album in the US in June 1975 and the following month in the UK, with fellow album track "Right" as the B-side.

"Fame" became Bowie's first song to top the Billboard Hot 100, displacing "Rhinestone Cowboy" by Glen Campbell during the week of 20 September 1975. The following week, "Fame" dropped to number two behind John Denver's "I'm Sorry" for a week, before returning to the top spot for one final week, ultimately being replaced at number one by Neil Sedaka's "Bad Blood". Bowie would later claim that he had "absolutely no idea" that the song would do so well as a single, saying "I wouldn't know how to pick a single if it hit me in the face." Despite "Fame" being Bowie's then-biggest success on the American charts, the song only reached number 17 in the UK Singles Chart.

Cash Box said that "with a scintillating rhythm track and chicken-guitar courtesy of Mr. Lennon, David's versatile voice blends with John's to produce an ethereal dancer with some R&B psychedelia thrown in." Dave Thompson of AllMusic calls the track "a hard-funking dance storm whose lyrics – a hostile riposte on the personal cost of success – utterly belie the upbeat tempo and feel of the song." Following Bowie's death in 2016, Rolling Stone listed it as one of Bowie's 30 essential songs. In 2018, the writers of NME, in their list of Bowie's 41 greatest songs, ranked "Fame" at number 21. In 2016, Ultimate Classic Rock placed the single at number 25 in a list ranking every Bowie single from worst to best.

"Fame" was used as the soundtrack of an animated music video of the same title, directed by Richard Jefferies and Mark Kirkland while students at California Institute of the Arts. The film, released in 1975, went on to win the Student Academy Award for animation and aired on NBC's The Midnight Special.

A 40th anniversary version of "Fame" was released in 2015 and peaked at number 141 in France.

== Live versions ==
A live performance recorded on 23 March 1976 was included on Live Nassau Coliseum '76, which was released as part of the 2010 reissues of the Station to Station album, on the 2016 collection Who Can I Be Now? (1974–1976), and as a stand-alone album in 2017. Performances from the 1978 Isolar II tour have been released on Stage (1978) and Welcome to the Blackout (2018). A live performance from the Serious Moonlight Tour, filmed on 12 September 1983, was included on the concert DVD Serious Moonlight (1984) and on the live album Serious Moonlight (Live '83), which was part of the 2018 box set Loving the Alien (1983–1988) and was released separately the following year. Live versions recorded during Bowie's 1987 Glass Spider Tour (in Sydney, Australia and Montreal, Canada) were released as part of the Glass Spider concert DVD/CD package. A July 1997 performance at the Phoenix Festival was released in 2021 on Look at the Moon! (Live Phoenix Festival 97). Bowie's 25 June 2000 performance of the song at the Glastonbury Festival was released in 2018 on Glastonbury 2000. An updated version recorded live by Bowie on 27 June 2000 was released on BBC Radio Theatre, London, 27 June 2000, a bonus disc accompanying the first release of Bowie at the Beeb in 2000. A November 2003 live performance from the A Reality Tour is featured on the A Reality Tour DVD, released in 2004, as well as the A Reality Tour album, released in 2010.

== Other releases ==
"Fame" was released as the B-side of the US release of "Beauty and the Beast" in January 1978. It appears on several compilations, including: Changesonebowie (1976); Bowie: The Singles 1969–1993 (1993); The Best of David Bowie 1974/1979 (1998); Best of Bowie (2002); The Platinum Collection (2006); Nothing Has Changed (2014); and Legacy (The Very Best of David Bowie) (2016). The 7" single version appeared on The Best of Bowie (1980) as well as on Have a Nice Decade: The 70s Pop Culture Box (1998). Re:Call 2, part of the Who Can I Be Now? (1974–1976) compilation released in 2016, included an attempted reconstruction of the single edit, which has been criticised as inaccurate.

== Charts ==
=== Weekly charts ===
Weekly chart performance for "Fame"
Chart (1975–2016)	Peak position
Belgium (Ultratop 50 Flanders)	17
Belgium (Ultratop 50 Wallonia)	20
Canada (CHUM)	1
Canada Top Singles (RPM)	3
France (SNEP)	181
Hungary (Single Top 40)	12
Netherlands (Dutch Top 40)	4
Netherlands (Single Top 100)	6
Norway (VG-lista)	9
UK Singles (Official Charts)	17
US Billboard Hot 100	1
US Hot Rock & Alternative Songs (Billboard)	14
US R&B (Billboard)	21

=== Year-end charts ===
Year-end chart performance for "Fame"
Chart (1975)	Peak position
Canada	37
Netherlands	71
US Billboard Hot 100	8

== Certifications ==
Certifications for "Fame"
Region	Certification	Certified units/sales
Canada (Music Canada)	Gold	82,124
New Zealand (RMNZ)	Gold	15,000^{‡}
United States (RIAA)	Gold	1,000,000^{^}
^{^} Shipments figures based on certification alone.^{‡} Sales+streaming figures based on certification alone.

== Personnel ==
According to biographer Chris O'Leary:

- David Bowie – lead vocals, rhythm guitar, piano, percussion
- John Lennon – backing vocals, acoustic guitar
- Carlos Alomar – lead and rhythm guitars
- Earl Slick – rhythm guitar
- Emir Ksasan – bass
- Dennis Davis – drums, vibraslap

== "Fame '90" ==
"Fame '90"

Single by David Bowie

from the album Changesbowie
- Released: 26 March 1990
- Length: 3:36 (Gass Mix)
- Label: EMI; Rykodisc
- Songwriters: David Bowie; Carlos Alomar; John Lennon
- Producer: Arthur Baker

David Bowie singles chronology
"Never Let Me Down" (1987)	"Fame '90" (1990)	"Real Cool World" (1992)

Music video
- "Fame '90" on YouTube

A remixed version of "Fame" was released by EMI in 1990 to coincide with the Sound+Vision Tour, the release of the Changesbowie compilation, and the Pretty Woman soundtrack. Bowie wanted to remix a successful American single for the tour and album release; of the two options ("Let's Dance" and "Fame"), "Let's Dance" was deemed to be too recent. Bowie liked the choice: "It covers a lot of ground, Fame; it stands up really well in time. It still sounds potent. It's quite a nasty, angry little song. I quite like that." For the Sound+Vision tour, Bowie would incorporate elements of "Fame '90" into the live production.

Regarding the remix, Spitz states: "The best thing you can say about "Fame '90" is that it's much better than the Police's "Don't Stand So Close to Me '86" but far inferior to George Michael's "Freedom! '90". Ultimate Classic Rock called it a "now happily forgotten" remix and placed it at number 104 (out of 119) in a list ranking every Bowie single from worst to best.

=== Track listing ===
Song written by David Bowie, Carlos Alomar, and John Lennon.

US CD single (Rykodisc RCD5 1018)

1. "Fame '90" (with Queen Latifah) – 4:10
2. "Fame '90" (House Mix) – 5:58
3. "Fame '90" (Gass Mix) – 3:38
4. "Fame '90" (Hip Hop Mix) – 5:58
5. "Fame '90" (Absolutely Nothing Premeditated/Epic Mix) – 14:25

West Germany maxi CD single (EMI CDP 560-20-3805-2)

1. "Fame '90" (House Mix) – 5:58
2. "Fame '90" (Hip Hop Mix) – 5:58
3. "Fame '90" (Gass Mix) – 3:38
4. "Fame '90" (Queen Latifah's Rap Version) – 3:10

"Exclusive Changes pack" 7" vinyl single (FAMES 90)

1. "Fame '90" (Gass Mix) – 3:38
2. "Fame '90" (Queen Latifah's Rap Version) – 3:10

Limited edition 7" vinyl picture disc (FAME PD 90)

1. "Fame '90" (Gass Mix) – 3:38
2. "Fame '90" (Bonus Beat Mix) – 4:45
- The single was released in a variety of formats: as a 7" single, a cassette single, a 12" single, CD singles and two limited edition releases: a picture disc (featuring the unique "Bonus Beat mix") and a 7" envelope pack that included 3 prints reflecting different phases in Bowie's career and a unique mix of Queen Latifah's mix

=== Video ===
Film director Gus Van Sant directed the promotional video for this version, which featured clips from many of Bowie's previous videos. In the music video, Bowie also performs a dance with Louise Lecavalier, one of the main dancers of the Québécois contemporary dance troupe La La La Human Steps (whom Bowie would collaborate with on the Sound + Vision tour). The US version of the video replaces some of Bowie's music videos for scenes from the movie Pretty Woman.

=== Charts ===
Weekly chart performance for "Fame '90"
Chart (1990)	Peak position
Australia (ARIA)	85
Belgium (Ultratop)	22
Europe (Eurochart Hot 100)	69
Ireland (IRMA)	11
Italy Airplay (Music & Media)	3
Netherlands (Dutch Top 40)	17
Netherlands (Single Top 100)	16
New Zealand (RIANZ)	32
Switzerland (Schweizer Hitparade)	29
UK Singles (Official Charts Company)	28
US Dance Club Songs (Billboard)	6
US Hot Rap Songs (Billboard)	12
West Germany (GfK)	36
