= White Stains =

Collection of poetry written by English occultist Aleister Crowley, published in 1898

- Author: Aleister Crowley
- Cover artist: Aleister Crowley
- Language: English
- Genre: Erotic poetry
- Publisher: Leonard Smithers
- Publication date: 1898
- Publication place: Netherlands
- Media type: Print (Paperback)
- Pages: 118 pp

White Stains is a poetic work, its title based on semen, written by English author and occultist Aleister Crowley under the pseudonym "George Archibald Bishop". It was published in 1898 by Leonard Smithers in Amsterdam, Netherlands.

White Stains contains various poems in both English and French which can also be regarded as individual works. The majority of these poems are overtly sexual in content. Crowley claimed that he had written White Stains for the purpose of rewriting Richard von Krafft-Ebing's Psychopathia Sexualis in a lyrical form. As with other works of Crowley, obscenity is celebrated.

David Bowie references "white stains" in his song Station to Station.

== Selected poems ==
- "Dedicace" – Crowley tells of a lover whose sex is not clearly recognisable. The poem has a sado-masochistic tendency.
- "Sonnet to the Virgin Mary" – This poem is a praise to the Virgin Mary.
- "A Fragment" – This is a fragment of a theatrical work in a lyrical form. It deals with the meeting of two lovers, a man and a woman.
- "The Rainbow" – This poem is a praise to the glory of God.
- "With A Copy Of "Poems and Ballads" – In this poem which is written in French Crowley pays homage to a friend who is not clearly identifiable.
- "Ad Lydiam, Ut Secum A Marito Fugeret" – This is a poem about love which contains many descriptions of nature.
- "Contra Conjugium T.B.B" – This poem is introduced by a short preface in Latin. It is a religious praise sung by a priest in church.
- "The Ballad Of Choosing" – This is a poem about being predestined for fame. Every stanza ends with the sentence "Thou has a guerdon, is it not for hire?".
- "A Jealous Lover" – Crowley tells of a person, his love for a woman and his (or probably her) jealousy concerning his beloved.
- "Ballade De La Jolie Marion" – Only the title of this poem is French. The poem itself is written in English. It deals with the inevitability of the end of love due to being separated from the beloved person. Every stanza ends with the refrain "We must part, and love must die."
- "At Stockholm" – This poems deals with the unnecessarity of spoken language when kisses can speak for themselves.
- "Mathilde" – This is a poem about the sex appeal that Crowley sees in the title-giving woman.
- "Yet Time To Turn" – In this poem a man remembers himself of a woman he once loved.
- "All Night" – This is a poem about sex in the night.
- "Ode To Venus Callipyge" – This poem is a praise to Venus.
- "Volupté" – This poem is written in French. It is a poem about sexual desire.
