= Harry Maslin =

American record producer

Harry Maslin is an American record producer, recording/mixing engineer, and studio owner/designer.

In the mid-1970s, he engineered No. 1 hits for Barry Manilow ("Mandy"), and Dionne Warwick & The Spinners ("Then Came You"). As a producer, his chart hits include David Bowie's "Fame" (US No. 1) in 1975 and "Golden Years" (US No. 10) in 1976, as well as seven singles in the Top 5 for Air Supply from 1980 to 1982, including "The One That You Love" (US No. 1).

== Career ==
=== Philadelphia and New York ===
Harry Maslin was born in Philadelphia, and began his career in the 1960s by mixing live sound at the Electric Factory. There he mixed for various artists, including Cream, The Jimi Hendrix Experience, Moby Grape, Ten Years After, BB King, Moody Blues, Buddy Guy, Grateful Dead, Hot Tuna, Procol Harum, The Chambers Brothers, Frank Zappa, and Janis Joplin. He began his recording career at Regent Sound Studios in Philadelphia, and later joined Regent's New York facility. There he expanded his knowledge, learning studio and console design, disc cutting, studio recording, mixing, and management.

After two years at Regent, he moved to the Hit Factory Recording Studios as a chief recording engineer, where he engineered recordings by James Taylor, Bonnie Raitt, Carly Simon, Barry Manilow, and Dionne Warwick & The Spinners, among others. He contributed to projects such as Barry Manilow II (US No. 9), and its US No. 1 single "Mandy"; Warwick & The Spinners' 1974 single "Then Came You" (US No. 1) (produced by Thom Bell), plus Carly Simon's Hotcakes album (US No. 3), and her single "Mockingbird" (US No. 5).

=== Bowie, Rollers, and Air Supply ===
Moving to the Record Plant, Maslin would record for David Bowie, before producing a collaboration album between Bowie and John Lennon. In January 1975, at Electric Lady studios, Maslin oversaw the recording of "Fame" with Lennon on guest vocals, as well as a cover of Lennon's own song "Across the Universe". These sessions completed the hit album Young Americans. This album reached UK No. 2, US No. 9, and the single "Fame" was US No. 1.

Maslin also produced Bowie's next album, Station to Station, in Los Angeles in 1975. The album, released in 1976, charted at US No. 3 and UK No. 5, and included the singles “Golden Years” and “TVC15”.

Rejoining the Hit Factory, Maslin produced two albums for the Bay City Rollers (including the 1977 hit single "You Made Me Believe in Magic" ), "Don't Cry Out Loud" a signature hit for Melissa Manchester in 1978, and an album for Eric Carmen in 1980. Maslin then took over production of the first Air Supply album for Arista Records, which achieved multi-platinum sales. He was called back to produce the following two multi-platinum albums for Air Supply, that were highlighted by five Top Five singles in a row "Even The Nights Are Better", "Every Woman In The World", "Here I Am", "Sweet Dreams", and "The One That You Love".

=== Los Angeles ===
In 1983, Maslin opened his own studio, Image Recording Studios in Hollywood. Maslin reduced his workload as a producer and engineer and focused on studio management and consulting. Over the years, Image Recording Studios hosted mixer Chris Lord-Alge, Night Ranger, Madonna, Faith Hill, Henry Mancini, Quincy Jones, Guns N' Roses, Leonard Cohen, Tina Turner (including her hit single, "I Don't Wanna Fight"), Carlene Carter, Fleetwood Mac, Ray Charles, Melissa Etheridge, No Doubt, Janet Jackson, Lisa Loeb, Goo Goo Dolls, Michelle Branch, The Black Crowes, Cher, Sheryl Crow, Joe Cocker, Eric Clapton, Jewel, Butthole Surfers, Green Day (including their Grammy Record of the Year "Boulevard of Broken Dreams"), among others. Additionally, Image Recording mixed the music for many hit Hollywood movies including Lethal Weapon and The Hunt for Red October.

Among other engineering projects at Image Recording, Maslin worked on tracks for Jennifer Warren and Leonard Cohen, as well as Michael Jackson’s album HIStory.

Maslin has also served as a consultant for studio builders, equipment manufacturers, engineers, producers, A&R personnel, and music supervisors.

In 2005, Image Recording closed. Maslin has since built a digital ProTools studio for use by both himself and his producer/songwriter wife, Michele Vice-Maslin, and her company Sweetersongs.

In 2008, Maslin was again working with David Bowie mixing and re-mixing.

== Personal life ==
Maslin is married to Emmy award-winning songwriter and producer Michèle Vice-Maslin.

== Selective discography ==
=== Singles ===
- 1975: "Fame (David Bowie song)" - David Bowie (US No. 1)
- 1977: "It's a Game" - Bay City Rollers (UK No. 16)
- 1977: "You Made Me Believe in Magic" - Bay City Rollers (US No. 10, UK No. 34)
- 1977: "The Way I Feel Tonight" - Bay City Rollers (US No. 24)
- 1978: "Don't Cry Out Loud" - Melissa Manchester (US No. 10)
- 1980: "It Hurts Too Much" - Eric Carmen (US No. 75)
- 1980: "Lost in Love" - Air Supply (US No. 3)
- 1980: "Every Woman in the World" - Air Supply (US No. 5)
- 1981: "The One That You Love" - Air Supply (US No. 1)
- 1981: "Here I Am" - Air Supply (US No. 5)
- 1982: "Sweet Dreams" - Air Supply (US No. 5)
- 1982: "Even the Nights Are Better" - Air Supply (US No. 5)

=== Albums ===
- 1975: Young Americans - David Bowie (US No. 9, UK No. 2)
- 1976: Station to Station - David Bowie (US No. 3, UK No. 5)
- 1976: Earl Slick Band - Earl Slick Band
- 1976: Hoppkorv - Hot Tuna
- 1977: It's a Game - Bay City Rollers (US No. 23, UK No. 16)
- 1978: Strangers in the Wind - Bay City Rollers (US No. 129)
- 1978: Don't Cry Out Loud - Melissa Manchester (US No. 33)
- 1980: Lost in Love - Air Supply (US No. 22)
- 1981: The One That You Love - Air Supply (US No. 10)
- 1982: Now and Forever - Air Supply (US No. 25)
- 1982: Camilo (1983) - Camilo Sesto
- 2017: Live Nassau Coliseum '76 - David Bowie
