= Carlos Alomar =

Puerto Rican guitarist (born 1951)

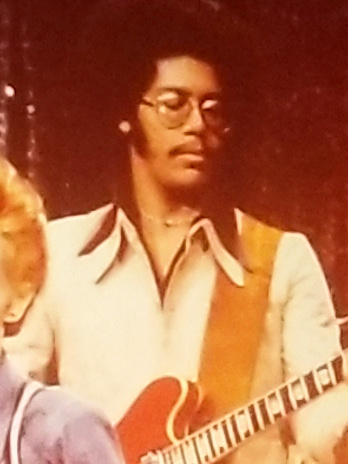
- Alomar performing with Bowie on The Dick Cavett Show in 1974

Background information
- Born: Carlos Alomar; 7 May 1951 (age 75); Ponce, Puerto Rico
- Origin: New York City, New York, U.S.
- Genres: Rock; new wave; ambient; electronica; neo soul
- Occupation: Musician
- Instruments: Guitar; vocals
- Years active: 1967–present
- Labels: RCA; EMI; Columbia; Polydor
- Spouse: Robin Clark (m. 1970)

Carlos Alomar (born 7 May 1951) is a Puerto Rican guitarist. He is best known for his work with David Bowie from the mid-1970s to the early 2000s, having played on more Bowie albums than any other musician.

== Early life ==
The son of a Pentecostal minister, Alomar was raised in New York. From the age of ten he taught himself to play the guitar, and started playing professionally at age sixteen. In the 1960s he performed during "Amateur Hour" at the Apollo Theater, eventually joining the house band, backing Chuck Berry and many leading soul artists. Around 1968–69 he toured for eight months in James Brown's live band, eventually quitting after being docked wages for missing a musical cue.

In 1969 Alomar formed a group called Listen My Brother with vocalists Luther Vandross, Fonzi Thornton, and Robin Clark who all went on to prominence. In 1969, the band played several times on Sesame Street, including on the show's pilot. That same summer, Listen My Brother also performed on the final day of the 1969 Harlem Cultural Festival. Alomar and bandmate Clark later wed and had a daughter named Lea.

Alomar subsequently played as a session musician for RCA Recording Studios, and others including Ben E. King ("Supernatural Thing", 1975) and Joe Simon ("Drowning in the Sea of Love"). He also met drummer Dennis Davis while they were both playing with jazz artist Roy Ayers. Alomar then toured with the band The Main Ingredient.

== Collaboration with David Bowie ==
Alomar met David Bowie in early 1974, during sessions for Lulu's recording of the Bowie-penned song "Can You Hear Me?". Bowie was keen for Alomar to join his band for the Diamond Dogs tour, but negotiations with Bowie's management stalled and Alomar stayed with The Main Ingredient. During a six-week break from his tour in mid-1974, Bowie recorded a series of songs for a new album in Sigma Sound Studios with Alomar, who brought in Vandross, Clark, Davis, and bassist Emir Kassan to contribute to the recordings as well. Most of the material for the Young Americans album was recorded during these sessions, and Alomar joined Bowie for the second leg of the Diamond Dogs tour (dubbed "The Philly Dogs Tour") in September–December 1974. In January 1975, Bowie and John Lennon recorded "Across the Universe" at Electric Lady Studios and from this session resulted the impromptu song "Fame", which evolved from the guitar riff Alomar had originated for the song "Foot Stompin'" during the Philly Dogs shows. With writing credit divided between Bowie, Alomar and Lennon (and funky guitar riffs later copied for James Brown's 1975 recording "Hot (I Need to be Loved)"), "Fame" gave Bowie his first US#1 single, and its parent album Young Americans (1975) marked Carlos Alomar's first appearance on a David Bowie album. This began a long period of collaboration in which Alomar led the rhythm section of Alomar/Dennis Davis/George Murray that would underpin Bowie's recordings for the next half-decade, behind a variety of lead guitarists, including Earl Slick, Stacey Heydon, Ricky Gardiner, Robert Fripp, and Adrian Belew.

Alomar played on Bowie's next album, Station to Station (1976), designing the riffs that opened the songs "Golden Years" and "Stay", and touring with Bowie for the Station To Station tour of 1976. This was Alomar's first Bowie tour as musical director; around this time, Alomar, Bowie, and Iggy Pop wrote the song "Sister Midnight"; originally performed by Bowie during the 1976 tour, it was later recorded by Bowie and Iggy as the opening track on Iggy's album The Idiot (1977) before being re-written by Bowie as "Red Money" for his album Lodger (1979). Alomar played on Bowie's groundbreaking "Berlin Trilogy" of albums—Low (1977), "Heroes" (1977) and Lodger; he also co-wrote the "Heroes" track "The Secret Life of Arabia" and the Lodger track "DJ" with Bowie and Brian Eno. In the Lodger single "Boys Keep Swinging", Alomar swapped instruments with Dennis Davis and played drums. Alomar played guitar on Iggy Pop's two Bowie-produced albums of 1977, The Idiot and Lust For Life, and in 1978, he joined Bowie for the world tour which resulted in the live album Stage. On this tour, Alomar was again the musical director, swapping his guitar for a baton to conduct the band during the drum-free instrumental pieces from Low and "Heroes".

Scary Monsters (1980) marked the last time Alomar would play alongside George Murray and Dennis Davis on a Bowie album; a planned Scary Monsters tour was aborted and Alomar instead joined Iggy Pop's band for a series of shows in October–December 1981 (the show from San Francisco on 25 November has been released on VHS and DVD). Alomar did not play on Bowie's album Let's Dance (1983) – the role of rhythm guitarist was undertaken by that album's co-producer, Nile Rodgers – but he re-joined Bowie as rhythm guitarist and musical director for the mammoth Serious Moonlight world tour in 1983. In 1984, Alomar played on Bowie's album Tonight; he also co-wrote the album's closing track, "Dancing With the Big Boys", with Bowie and Iggy Pop. In 1987, Alomar played on Bowie's album Never Let Me Down; the album's title track – released as a single and credited to Bowie/Alomar – was originally an Alomar composition entitled "I'm Tired," before it was re-written by Bowie. Alomar was the musical director/rhythm guitarist for Bowie's infamous and highly theatrical Glass Spider Tour in 1987 (beginning every show with a frenzied guitar solo), but Bowie ended his long-running creative association with Alomar after the critical panning of Never Let Me Down and the Glass Spider tour. The two men would not record together again until January–February 1995, during sessions in New York for Bowie's album Outside (1995). In the meantime, Alomar recorded and released his first solo album, Dream Generator, in 1988 on the Private Music label.

Alomar toured with Bowie's band for the first leg of the Outside Tour (September 1995 – February 1996). The tour was not a pleasant experience for Alomar, who found Bowie inaccessible and didn't get along with musical director Peter Schwartz, and he did not re-join Bowie when the tour resumed in June 1996. However, Alomar later played guitar on the Bowie tracks "Everyone Says 'Hi'" (from the album Heathen in 2002) and "Fly" (a bonus track on the limited-edition version of the album Reality in 2003).

== Other work ==
Alomar has performed with a number of other famous bands and musicians including Duran Duran's Arcadia, Paul McCartney, Simple Minds, Graham Parker, Mick Jagger, Iggy Pop, The Pretenders for their album Get Close in 1986, and Argentine rock band Soda Stereo. In all, Alomar has played on a total of 32 Gold and Platinum albums. He is currently the director of Boombacker Records. He was the bandleader on the short-lived TV chat show, The Caroline Rhea Show (2002–2003) and is also the president of the New York chapter of The Recording Academy, the organization responsible for the Grammy Awards. In 2005, Alomar joined the teaching staff of Stevens Institute of Technology (Hoboken, New Jersey) as an adjunct professor of Music & Technology, producing several tracks for the inaugural release of the school's Castle Point Records label's Delusions of Grandeur (2006). In 2010 Carlos Alomar was made their first "Distinguished Artist in Residence" and in 2011 he was awarded an honorary Bachelor of Arts.

Alomar collaborated with Scissor Sisters for their second album Ta-Dah, and one track from these recording sessions, "Transistor", which ultimately featured on the second disc of the deluxe edition of the album, featured his wife Robin and daughter Lea on backing vocals. In October 2008, he performed with Richard Barone at Carnegie Hall, as a special guest in Barone's theatrical concert, "FRONTMAN: A Musical Reading". In 2010 Alomar performed as guitarist on Alicia Keys album The Element of Freedom.

Alomar resides in North Bergen, New Jersey.

In 2025 Alomar put together a new touring band to honour David Bowie and Dennis Davis. The D.A.M. trilogy B2B (Back to Berlin) played "only the fast tracks" from Bowie's "Berlin Trilogy" (Low, Heroes and Lodger) as well as encores from Station To Station and Scary Monsters, starting a European tour in Berlin's Metropol on Friday 7th November 2025. This band consisted of Alomar, George Murray, Kevin Armstrong, Tal Bergman, Michael Cunio, Lea Lórien and Alex Tosca.

== Selected discography ==
Solo album

- Dream Generator (1987)

With ANGIESCREAMS

- The Revelation of Arthur Lynn (as producer) (2010)

With Arcadia

- So Red the Rose (Parlophone, 1985)

With Kenny Barron

- Lucifer (1975)

With Bee Gees

- Still Waters (Polydor, 1997)

With David Bowie

- Young Americans (RCA Victor, 1975)
- Station to Station (RCA Victor, 1976)
- Low (RCA Victor, 1977)
- "Heroes" (RCA Victor, 1977)
- Lodger (RCA Victor, 1979)
- Scary Monsters (RCA Records, 1980)
- Tonight (EMI, 1984)
- Never Let Me Down (EMI, 1987)
- Outside (Arista, 1995)
- Heathen (ISO, 2002)
- Reality (ISO, 2003)

With Casiopea

- Sun Sun (1986)

With Brandon Flowers

- The Desired Effect (Island Records, 2015)

With Julia Fordham

- Julia Fordham (Circa, 1988)

With FUN

- PAX (as guitar) (1996)
- CHAOS (as guitar) (1997)

With Debbie Gibson

- Anything Is Possible (Atlantic, 1990)
- Deborah (Portazul, 1997)

With Alicia Keys

- The Element of Freedom (Sony, 2009)

With Ben E. King

- Supernatural (Atlantic, 1975)

With Cyndi Lauper

- Hat Full of Stars (Epic Records, 1993)

With Paul McCartney

- Press to Play (Parlophone, 1986)

With Jimmy Owens

- Headin' Home (A&M, 1978)

With Iggy Pop

- The Idiot (RCA Victor, 1977)
- Lust for Life (RCA Victor, 1977)

With Mark Ronson

- Uptown Special (Columbia Records, 2015)

With Jennifer Rush

- Wings of Desire (Columbia, 1989)

With Carly Simon

- Letters Never Sent (Arista, 1994)

With Scissor Sisters

- Ta-Dah (Universal, 2006)

With Belouis Some

- Some People (Parlophone, 1985)
- Belouis Some (Capitol, 1987)

With Soda Stereo

- Doble Vida (as producer, guest guitar and rapper) (1988)

With Wilkins (singer)

- L.A. N.Y. (WEA International, 1989)

== Equipment ==
- Alembic Guitar (Maverick)
- Mu-tron Bi-Phase
- Roland Space echo
