= Glass Spider Tour =

1987 concert tour by David Bowie

The Glass Spider Tour
- Tour by David Bowie
- Promotional poster for the tour
- Location: Europe; North America; Oceania
- Associated album: Never Let Me Down
- Start date: 30 May 1987
- End date: 28 November 1987
- Legs: 3
- No. of shows: 27 in Europe; 44 in North America; 15 in Oceania; 86 in total
- Box office: US$86 million

David Bowie concert chronology
- Serious Moonlight Tour (1983); The Glass Spider Tour (1987); Sound+Vision Tour (1990)
Tin Machine tour chronology
The Glass Spider Tour (1987)	Tin Machine Tour (1989)

The Glass Spider Tour was a 1987 worldwide concert tour by the English musician David Bowie, launched in support of his album Never Let Me Down and named for that album's track "Glass Spider". It began in May 1987 and was preceded by a two-week press tour that saw Bowie visit nine countries throughout Europe and North America to drum up public interest in the tour. The Glass Spider Tour was the first Bowie tour to visit Austria, Italy, Spain, Ireland and Wales. Through a sponsorship from Pepsi, the tour was intended to visit Russia and South America as well, but these plans were later cancelled. The tour was, at that point, the longest and most expensive tour Bowie had embarked upon in his career. At the time, the tour's elaborate set was called "the largest touring set ever".

Bowie conceived the tour as a theatrical show, and included spoken-word introductions to some songs, vignettes, and employed visuals including projected videos, theatrical lighting and stage props. On stage, Bowie was joined by guitarist Peter Frampton and a troupe of five dancers choreographed by long-time Bowie collaborator Toni Basil. With the theme "Rock stars vs Reality", the show was divided into two acts and an encore. The set list was modified over the course of the tour as Bowie dropped some of his newer material in favour of older songs from his repertoire.

The tour was generally poorly received at the time for being perceived as overblown and pretentious. Despite the criticism, Bowie in 1991 remarked that this tour laid the groundwork for later successful theatrical tours by other artists, and the set's design and the show's integration of music and theatrics has inspired later acts by a variety of artists. Starting in the late 2000s, the tour began to collect accolades for its successes, and in 2010 the tour was named one of the top concert tour designs of all time.

The tour was financially successful and well-attended, being seen by perhaps as many as six million fans worldwide, but the negative critical reception of the album and tour led Bowie to not only abandon plans for other elaborate stage shows, but to reconsider his motivations for making music.

Performances from this tour were released on the VHS video Glass Spider (1988, re-released on DVD in 2007).

== Background ==
In the four years prior to the release of Never Let Me Down, Bowie had worked on a series of miscellaneous projects that included collaborations with the Pat Metheny Group for "This Is Not America" and Mick Jagger for "Dancing in the Street". He also continued acting and composing for film soundtracks such as Absolute Beginners (1985) and Labyrinth (1986).

In 1985, after his successful performance at Live Aid and a live performance with Tina Turner for one of her shows on her 1985 Private Dancer Tour, Bowie collaborated with his friend Iggy Pop for his solo album Blah-Blah-Blah, producing and co-writing multiple tracks. He then worked with Turkish musician Erdal Kızılçay for the title song of the 1986 film When the Wind Blows. In late 1986, Bowie began recording sessions for his album Never Let Me Down, which was released in April 1987. He had not toured for his 1984 album Tonight, making the Glass Spider Tour his first tour in four years.

== Development ==
Preparations for the tour began as early as 1986, when Bowie warned his band to "be ready for next year." Bowie was initially mum on his plans for his tour, saying only "I'm going to do a stage thing this year, which I'm incredibly excited about, 'cause I'm gonna take a chance again." When asked if he would elaborate on his plans, he replied "No! [Laughs.] Too many other acts are goin' out. I'll just be doing what I always did, which is keeping things interesting."

"I've eaten, slept, and thought about nothing but this show for six months."

— David Bowie, June 1987 in London

Bowie was joined by long-time friend Peter Frampton on the tour. Frampton said "I don't have a book to sell; I don't have an album to sell; I'm just here as a guitarist. The pressure is off. I'm enjoying myself." Frampton and Bowie had known each other since their teen years when they both attended Bromley Technical School, where Frampton's father, Owen Frampton, was Bowie's art teacher.

Bowie had a clear goal for this tour: to return to the theatrics that he had performed during his short-lived 1974 Diamond Dogs Tour. He wanted this tour to be "ultra-theatrical, a combination of music, theater, and rock", and he felt that his previous tour, while successful, had veered away from the theatrics that he preferred:

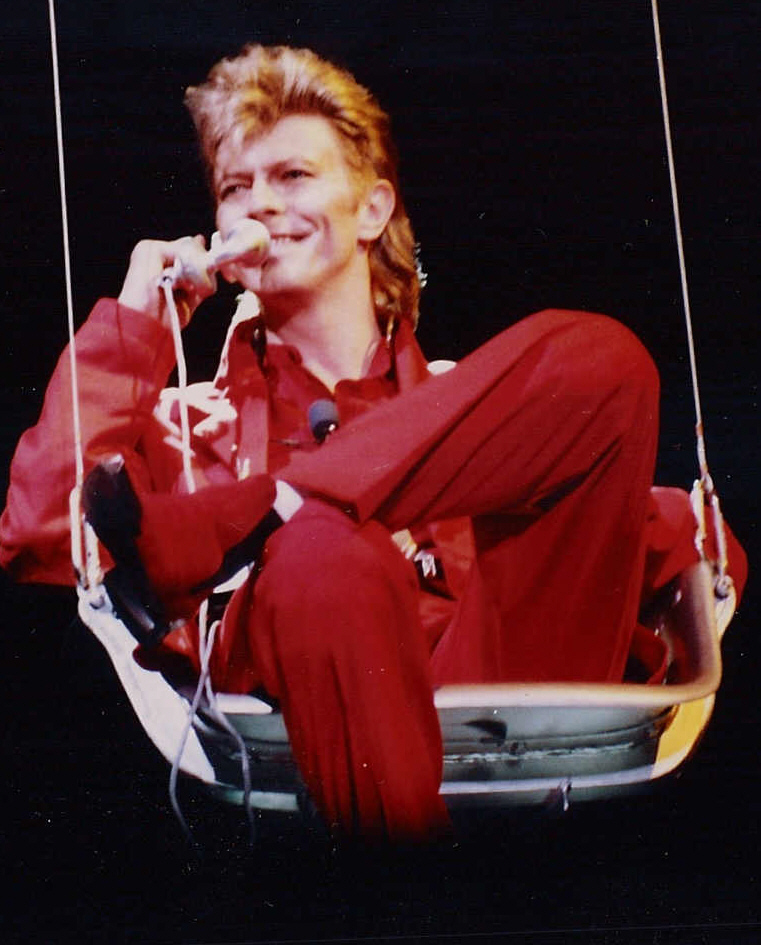
Bowie being lowered from the spider set's ceiling, to the opening song "Glass Spider" at Rock am Ring – 7 June 1987

[In 1983 for the Serious Moonlight Tour] the promoters were coming around and saying, "Listen David, we moved you from this 10,000 seater up to this 30,000-seater" ... and it grew and grew and there were 60,000-seaters coming up. ... Let's trim back on the theatrics and really go for giving them songs that they've heard on the radio for the last 15 years or so – songs they probably didn't realize when added up are a great body of work coming from this guy. ... Whereas with [The Glass Spider] tour coming up, I feel I've established that. What I now want to do is have the songs work for the performance. ... Certainly there will be obscure songs on it, at least for the general public. There will be songs from albums that weren't huge albums, but now those particular songs actually fit a section of the show. So when you put three songs together, you can create a vignette that works. It has a beginning and a conclusion and deals with one subject.

Bowie indicated that he was "testing the waters" with this tour, and was potentially considering other large, elaborate stage shows if the tour was successful:

The songs have to work within the show—not the show working for the songs, if you see what I mean. That's why it's so different. And that's why it's so exciting, because that's the way I really like working. I mean, I like devising a show. I've got a show book that is almost like the bible you have when you're working on a play. It's written and structured with various thematic devices. Unfortunately, it's in revue form, because none of the songs were written for the show. That's the ultimate, of course. If this works the way I hope it does, then the next step for me will be to write a piece specifically for arenas and stadiums, which is almost like taking a musical on the road that has one narrative form all the way through, with a cast of characters, and is written for epic theater.

Bowie decided that the theme for the show would be "the reality and unreality of rock," or, as one critic called it, "rock stars vs. reality". Bowie said, "It's not just about a rock singer, it's about rock music, so it has a lot to do with the audience and how they perceive rock, and rock figures, and all the cliches, archetypes and stereotypes, and also family relationship."

During the show itself, Bowie incorporated a wide variety of props: "I'm really attempting to do a lot of stuff! It incorporates movement, dialogue, fragments of film, projected images, it's what used to be called multi-media in the '60s." Bowie described how he assembled the show, saying, "The idea was to concoct surrealist or minimalist stage pieces to accompany rock-and-roll songs. I wanted to bridge together some kind of symbolist theater and modern dance. Not jazz dance, certainly not MTV dance, but something more influenced by people like Pina Bausch and a Montreal group called La La La Human Steps. There are some symbolist pieces, some minimalist pieces, and some vulgar pieces, too – some straightforward Vaudeville bits."

When Bowie was asked what he thought his audience expected of him on this tour, he said:

I guess that they come along to see whether I'll fall down or something. I really don't know. I know that they get what they consider is a really good performance. I think that over the years I've proved that I do my best to provide them with some new vision of musical information on the stage. So I think there's probably that element in it, but I couldn't go any further than that. I really don't know what they want from me. I've never really been able to write for them. I've only written and performed that which interests me. So essentially they have an agreement with me and that's great. I mean, I've lost audiences many times over the years, and they've come back again for one reason or another. I've sort of got that mutual agreement with them. If it's not going very well then they stay away. Which is fair enough, you know.

Bowie reportedly coordinated aspects of the tour via email, a rarity in the late 1980s. Management, scheduling and planning for the tour was handled by Bowie's management company, Isolar.

== Promotion ==
In announcing the tour, Bowie embarked on a series of promotional press shows covering nine countries in two weeks, including Canada, the US and seven countries in Europe. The press tour shows were typically delivered in smaller venues seating around 300 people, and local fans were often allowed into the events. He used the opportunity to educate the press on his album and the tour, and the multiple dates allowed him to correct misinformation. At the London Glass Spider Press Conference, he clarified that "I didn't say 'lights, costumes and sex,' what I said was 'lights, costumes and theatrical sets'" in response to a question about what the audience could expect when seeing his new live show. Press tour shows included live performances of some of the songs from the album Never Let Me Down.

Articles promoting Bowie's album and tour appeared in non-music periodicals in mid- to late-1987 such as In Fashion, Mademoiselle and Teen magazines.

Bowie agreed to what at the time was considered a controversial commercial sponsorship agreement with PepsiCo, which was later seen as helping to pave the way for other big money tours by other artists. For his part, Bowie recorded a TV commercial with Tina Turner to the tune "Modern Love" in May 1987 while he was preparing for the tour. Of the sponsorship agreement, Bowie said, "We did a commercial sponsorship thing only for North America with the Pepsi-Cola company. As far as I'm concerned, what it's allowed me to do, having them underwrite the tour, is to be able to produce a far more extravagant show than if I were just doing it myself. It means that instead of just having 1 or 2 sets I can have 3 or 4 sets made, and they can travel independently and they can be far more complicated."

Bowie had originally planned to take the Glass Spider Tour to Russia, albeit with the band only and no dancers or elaborate props, but with the money and extra stage provided by the sponsorship, Bowie felt he could take the full tour to Russia and South America. However, these plans failed to come to fruition, and the tour never reached those regions.

== Song selection ==
Bowie elected to play less well-known songs on the tour and avoided some of his bigger hits. He was eager to not repeat the formula that made the Serious Moonlight Tour a success, saying, "It seemed so easy. It was cheers from the word go. You know how to get a reaction – play 'Changes,' 'Golden Years' and they'd be up on their feet. You get the reaction, take the money and run away. It seemed too easy. I didn't want to do that again." In a different contemporary interview he said, "I'm not doing 'Star' again. That was quite hard. I don't think I'm doing much Ziggy material on this tour! [laughs] Probably use a lot of that mid-70s material, but not the more ponderous things like 'Warszawa.' I tried that, and that was a bit yawn-making. There was one I was humming to myself the other day: [sings] 'Baby, baby, I'll never let you down' – oh lord, what's that one? Jesus, I can't remember it. ... 'Sons of the Silent Age!' [snaps fingers] Ah! That's right! Thank god I could remember it! So that for me now is a new song. I've never done that one onstage." "Sons of the Silent Age" was performed every night of the tour.

All but two songs ("Too Dizzy" and "Shining Star (Makin' My Love)") from his album Never Let Me Down were played live during the tour, although "Shining Star" was among the songs rehearsed. Other songs rehearsed but not performed were "Because You're Young" and "Scream Like a Baby", both from Scary Monsters (And Super Creeps) (1980). Several songs that Bowie had anticipated playing on the tour were abandoned before rehearsals even started, including "Space Oddity" (from David Bowie (1969)), "Joe the Lion" (from "Heroes" (1977)), "Ricochet" (from Let's Dance (1983)), and "Don't Look Down" (from Tonight (1984)).

Songs performed during the tour were "chosen because they fit the performance" and fit Bowie's goal to make a show that was much more theatrical and had strong dramatic content. When he was asked how he was going to make his rock show "dramatic", he replied, "You'll be surprised what you can do with a 6-piece rock band and a stage and a couple of lights."

== Set design ==
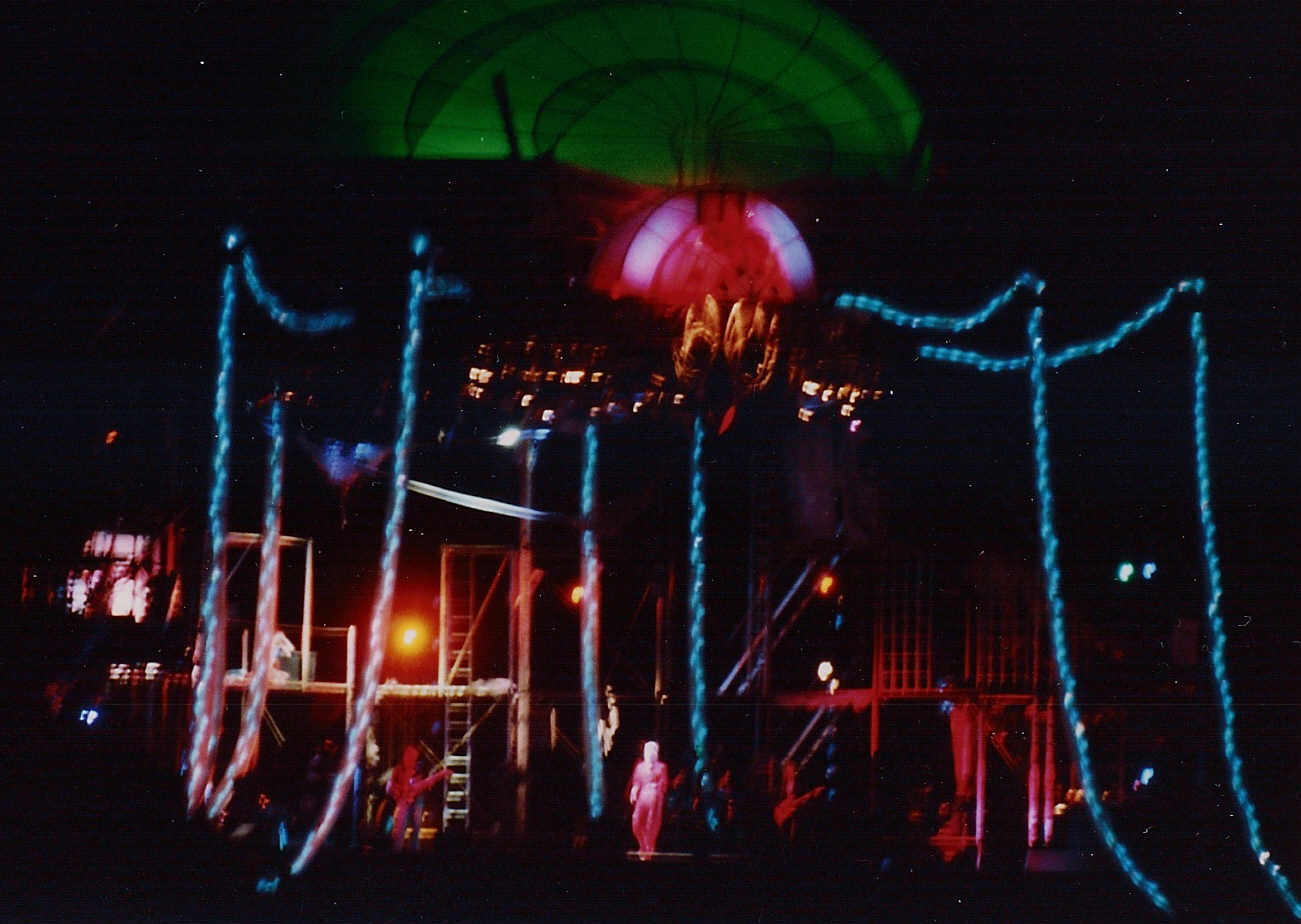
Bowie on stage at Rock am Ring – 7 June 1987

The tour's set, described at the time as "the largest touring set ever," was designed to look like a giant spider. It was 60 feet (18.3m) high, 64 feet (19.5m) wide and included giant vacuum tube legs that were lit from the inside with 20,000' (6,096m) of colour-changing lights. A single set took 43 trucks to move and was estimated to weigh 360 tons. 16' x 20' (4.9m x 6m) video screens displayed video and images from the show to those in the audience who were further away from the stage. The system required to run the show included two separate sound systems, 260 speaker cabinets, 1,000 lights with an output total of 600,000 watts, and three computers. Mark Ravitz, the set designer, had previously designed Bowie's 1974 Diamond Dogs Tour set.

This was Bowie's first tour where wireless microphone technology was available, allowing Bowie considerable freedom to move around the stage during a concert. This allowed him to interact with the dancers and musicians much more freely, and as such the set included 3-story high mobile scaffolding, onto which Bowie and his dancers would occasionally climb during the show.

Each set cost US$10 million, about $28.3 million in today's dollars. Bowie himself invested over $10 million of his own money to help fund the tour, and he paid $1 million a week to maintain a staff of 150 people to maintain and build the three sets as the tour moved around the world. In Philadelphia, where the tour opened in the US, the set was described as taking "300 people 4 days" to build.

About halfway through the first leg of the tour in Europe, Bowie discovered that the full Spider set was so large that it would not fit in most indoor venues. He said, "It would cost me between $500,000 and $600,000 to alter the sets enough to bring the show indoors. ... I may decide to have a smaller 'indoor' set made somewhere during the tour." He did in fact commission a third slightly smaller set, called the "Junior Bug" set, to be used at indoor venues where the full spider would not fit, such as New York's Madison Square Garden.

Bowie thought of the whole set as a metaphor of life, describing the stage as having "a feeling of a ship, which is the voyage, with the rigging and the climbing and the ropes. And the bottom circular area is like the Circus of Lights, so it really is from birth, and the voyaging through life."

== Rehearsals ==
Bowie assembled his band in early 1987 and were joined on stage by five dancers who were choreographed by Bowie's long-time friend Toni Basil. The band and the dancers spent time in 12-hour-a-day rehearsals in New York before moving on to Europe. Bowie shot the video for his single "Time Will Crawl" during these rehearsals; it previewed some of the elaborate dance routines that were used during performances of "Loving the Alien" (1985), "Fashion" (1980) and "Sons of the Silent Age" (1977). Bowie described his rehearsal routine:

I prepare the day's work when I get up in the morning, and then I go in around 10 o'clock (a.m.) for rehearsals. Then it's constant rehearsals, both the visual side and the musical side, through about 8 o'clock (p.m.). At around 8 p.m. I look at the video tapes of what we've been doing during the day, and make adjustments if necessary. So there really isn't time to do anything else at all except Sundays, and then I sleep for most of the day. It's very intensive rehearsals, and physically it's quite demanding.

"[The Glass Spider Tour is] the most physical tour that I've done ever. ... It's relentless, it never stops. I'm bruised as hell. I feel like a worn out rag doll."

— David Bowie, 1987

Rehearsals with the full Spider set were staged in Rotterdam's Ahoy arena starting on 18 May before moving to De Kuip stadium for the dress rehearsals (27 and 28 May). Due to relatively easy access to the venues during rehearsals, fans knew what the set list for the show would be before the tour even opened.

Bowie stated that he was looking for dancers who did not look like typical MTV dancers and who knew both American street-dancing and European performance art. Originally Bowie had hoped to have Édouard Lock of La La La Human Steps be involved in the show, but the group was booked with other commitments. Three years later, Bowie lamented that the tour may have been received more positively if La La La Human Steps had been involved: "It would have been a different ballgame." La La La Human Steps would provide the choreography for Bowie's next tour, the Sound+Vision Tour of 1990.

== Concert synopsis ==
The show was divided into two parts and included a planned encore.

The Glass Spider set from above – 6 June 1987 in Berlin

Bowie entered the show to the song "Glass Spider", for which he was lowered from the set's ceiling while seated in a silver chair and singing into a telephone. The show's first vignette began with "Bang Bang", during which Bowie pulled an audience member out of the crowd, only to be rejected by the fan, who by the end of the song was revealed to be one of the troupe's dancers. Later in the show, for the song "Fashion", the dance troupe threatened Bowie with a street fight, which, by the end of the song, he accidentally wins. For the live rendition of "Never Let Me Down", the performance of which Bowie called "abrasive", he was influenced by the minimalist choreography of Pina Bausch. He said:

I wanted one straight movement that starts upstage and comes all the way downstage and doesn't vary. I'm on my knees, with my arms in a kind of straitjacket, and a crawl for three-and-a-half minutes. A girl is with me, as if she's accompanying her pet in a park, but she has a cylinder on her back, and every now and then she's giving me oxygen. It felt like a very protective, a very sad little image, and it felt right for the song.

For Part 2, Bowie appeared on the stage's scaffolding to "'87 & Cry", flew through the air in a Flying by Foy abseiling harness, and was subsequently tied up by riot police. On at least one occasion, the flying segment of the song was dropped due to a malfunction with the set or bad weather. The movie footage shown behind Bowie during "'Heroes'" was shot by Bowie himself during his time in Russia in 1974, of which he said:

There's a poignant image of a Mongolian with a hanky in his hand waving goodbye to his family getting on a train to Moscow and I loop that up so there's a never ending sequence of this old fellow dabbing his tears and waving bye-bye. That plays behind the action in black and white and it's alarmingly sad. It's like saying goodbye to heroism; it's like saying goodbye to a world of a 19th century ideal. It's irretrievable and now maybe we’re just looking for seeds of intelligence and not heroes. There's something about it that I really like. It's a piece of theatricality that I really adore. I’m really proud of it.

The encore typically opened with the song "Time", for which Bowie emerged from the top of the spider's head with angel wings behind him, 60 feet above the crowd. The song was occasionally cut from outdoor shows when bad weather made the perch atop the spider too precarious to perform.

== Costume design ==
For the first act, Bowie was dressed in a single-breasted three-quarters length red suit with a red shirt and pants designed by Diana Moseley. The outfit included red Chelsea boots with silver details at the heel and toe. One of the outfits that Bowie wore for Part 2, signed by Bowie, was put up for auction on 21 May 2016 and was sold for $37,500. Bowie's outfit for the encore was a gold lamé leather suit complete with gold winged cowboy boots. One of these suits, also autographed by Bowie, sold at a Sotheby's auction in 1990 for $7,000 (worth about $17,300 today) several times its expected selling price. That same outfit was again put up for auction in December 2016 with an expected selling price of $20,000–$30,000, and was sold for $32,500.

== Setlists ==
On tour, the band typically performed a roughly two and a half-hour set that varied only a little from night to night.

Early European set list

Part 1

1. "Up the Hill Backwards"
2. "Glass Spider"
3. "Up the Hill Backwards (reprise)"
4. "Day-In Day-Out"
5. "Bang Bang"
6. "Absolute Beginners"
7. "Loving the Alien"
8. "China Girl"
9. "Fashion"
10. "Scary Monsters (and Super Creeps)"
11. "All the Madmen"
12. "Never Let Me Down"
13. "Big Brother" / "Chant of the Ever Circling Skeletal Family"

Late European / American / Australasian set list

Part 1

1. "Up the Hill Backwards"
2. "Glass Spider"
3. "Up the Hill Backwards (reprise)"
4. "Day-In Day-Out"
5. "Bang Bang"
6. "Absolute Beginners"
7. "Loving the Alien"
8. "China Girl"
9. "Rebel Rebel"
10. "Fashion"
11. "Scary Monsters (and Super Creeps)"
12. "All the Madmen"
13. "Never Let Me Down"
14. "Big Brother" / "Chant of the Ever Circling Skeletal Family"

Part 2

14. "'87 & Cry"
15. "'Heroes'"
16. "Time Will Crawl"
17. Band introductions
18. "Beat of Your Drum"
19. "Sons of the Silent Age"
20. "New York's in Love"
21. "Dancing with the Big Boys"
22. "Zeroes"
23. "Let's Dance"
24. "Fame"

Part 2

15. "'87 & Cry"
16. "'Heroes'"
17. "Time Will Crawl"
18. Band introductions
19. "Young Americans"
20. "Beat of Your Drum"
21. "Sons of the Silent Age"
22. "The Jean Genie"
23. "White Light/White Heat"
24. "Let's Dance"
25. "Fame"

Encore

25. "Time"
26. "Blue Jean"
27. "Modern Love"

Encore

26. "Time"
27. "Blue Jean"
28. "I Wanna Be Your Dog"
29. "Modern Love"

=== Notes and changes (Note: Sources for this section:) ===
- An extended drum solo separated Part 1 and Part 2 and allowed Bowie time for a costume change.
- Bowie would lengthen or shorten his performance of "Fame" depending on the crowd's reaction by including parts of "Lavender's Blue", "London Bridge", "War" and "Who Will Buy?" into the song.
- "White Light/White Heat" and "Fame" were performed during the encore at some venues.
- "I Wanna Be Your Dog" was only occasionally performed at shows during the North American and Oceania tours.
- "Time" would only be performed if it was safe for Bowie to stand on top of the spider's head for the start of the encore. If it was raining the song would be completely dropped as it was unsafe.
- "New York's in Love" was dropped after 10 June (Milan, Italy).
- "The Jean Genie" was added on 8 July (Barcelona, Spain).
- "White Light/White Heat" and "Young Americans" were added and "Zeroes" was dropped on 11 July (Slane, Ireland).
- "Rebel Rebel" was added and "Dancing with the Big Boys" was dropped on 30 July (Philadelphia, USA).

== Opening acts ==
The opening act for the tour varied from country to country; in North America some dates of the tour were supported by Duran Duran or Siouxsie and the Banshees. The opening acts in Europe varied, and included such acts as Iggy Pop, Big Country, The Cult, Erasure, The Stranglers and Nina Hagen. The tour also played festival dates, on one occasion with Eurythmics headlining one night and Bowie headlining the next.

== Tour incidents ==
The tour took a physical toll on Bowie. Not only did he grow noticeably thinner over the course of the tour, he found that he was exhausted before the tour even started:

I think [tours like this] are extravagantly dangerous to do because they're so fucking tiring. Just the pressures of organising the event, and it's no longer a show, it's an event. Even before you go out on tour, you're knackered. There's God knows how many people running around, and everybody's doing something and people are forgetting to delegate jobs to the right people, and it's a mass of confusion and somehow it's all supposed to come together.

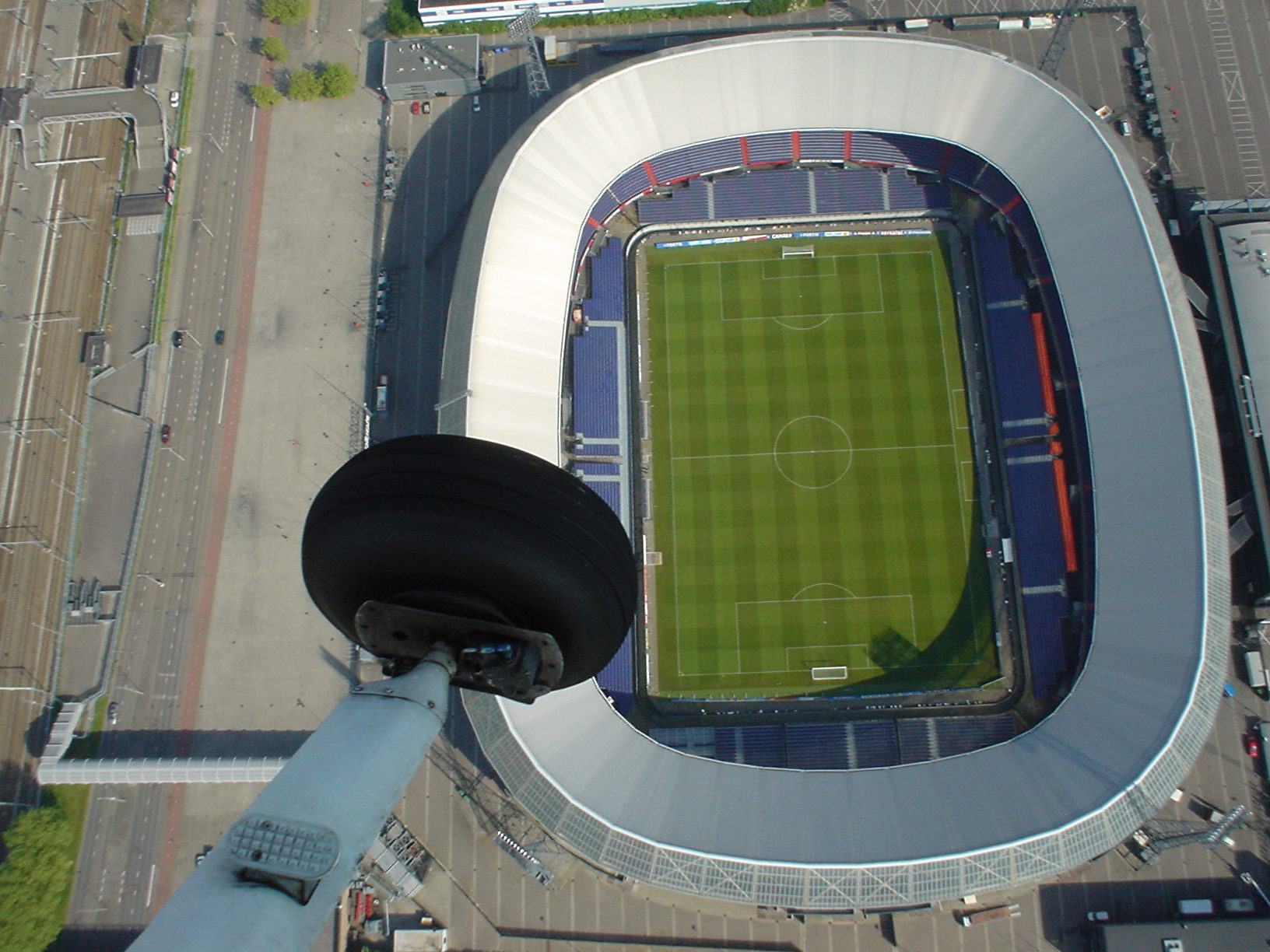
A modern aerial view of De Kuip, where Bowie opened the tour

The tour played at large-capacity venues, and in Europe the tour alternated between indoor and outdoor, open-field venues.

Michael Clark, a lighting engineer for the tour, died at the Stadio Comunale in Florence, Italy, on 9 June after falling from the scaffolding before the show commenced. The following day on 10 June, another worker fell without lethal injury while helping build the set in Milan. Mobs of fans, some who had camped out overnight to get into the venue, rioted and had to be controlled by police. Both shows in Rome (on 15 and 16 June) saw similar rioting as fans who could not get tickets to the shows clashed with police. On the second night, Bowie had to sing through tear gas as 50 people were arrested and 15 policemen were injured in the rioting. As the band's plane was leaving Rome after their show on 16 June, a bomb scare forced the plane to return to the airport, only to discover that the local chief of police had used it as a ruse to get Bowie's autograph. Said Bowie of the incident, "I was not so much annoyed as stunned – that could only happen in Italy!" On 18 June, one day before the first of two Wembley shows, Bowie appeared on Top of the Pops to record a performance of "Time Will Crawl", his then-current single. The 27 June concert, originally scheduled to be performed at Ullevi, Gothenburg, Sweden had to be moved to nearby Eriksberg in Hisingen because a previous concert by Bruce Springsteen held at Ullevi Stadium incurred £2.7m (or about £8m today) in damages. A fan trying to enter the Slane Castle backstage area by swimming the River Boyne drowned just before the show on 11 July. Bad weather over the course of the European leg often impacted the show, leading to the flying segment for "'87 and Cry" or the "Time" finale or both being skipped entirely at least a half dozen times, and often made the songs and inter-song dialogue hard to hear.

At one point during the European tour, guitarist Carlos Alomar ripped a ligament in his leg, an injury that caused him to change his on-stage character. Said Alomar, "[I] had to change my character into the mad, limping Mad Max reject with spiky hair. I went to a chiropractor and asked him for a lot of metal stuff – leg braces, back braces and everything. Now I'll be adding more metal as the show progresses."

Bowie was occasionally visited or had his shows attended by European royalty, including Princess Diana at the second show in Wembley Stadium; Sarah, Duchess of York at Sunderland; and Danish Prince Joachim and Crown Prince Frederik at Stadt Park.

The Glass Spider Tour was the first Bowie tour to reach Italy, Spain, and Ireland. Some of the outdoor performances in Britain had to start early due to curfew laws, a problem typically avoided in other European shows, which reduced the impact of the lighting of the stage and set dressing, and bothered Bowie considerably. In a contemporary interview, he said that for "daylight shows" in Belgium and England, which had to start and end earlier, he modified the set list to put in more "familiar" songs, since the lighting wasn't effective during the day. Said Bowie, "Because the show is so geared towards the theatricality, that the emphasis is on 'vision' on some areas, where it's just hopeless to try and make that vision work during daylight. There's so much of it that's focused by the lighting, and if you haven't got any lighting, you're not putting out what your show is really about."

During the North American leg of the tour, a 30-year-old Dallas woman named Wanda Nichols claimed that Bowie sexually assaulted her at the Mansion Hotel after a show at Reunion Arena in Dallas. Bowie denied the charges, calling them "ridiculous". He said Nichols was with him in his hotel room, but that anything that occurred between them was with her consent. A spokeswoman for assistant district attorney Hugh Lucas said on 18 November 1987 that the Dallas County grand jury no-billed Bowie after hearing two hours of testimony on 11 November. "The Grand jury did not find enough evidence to warrant an indictment," the spokeswoman said.

The final show in Melbourne was played in a rain and windstorm so heavy that the show was performed without dancers and several of the elaborate set pieces were not performed at all.

== Ticket sales and attendance ==
"I try and do something I want to go and see really, that's the essence of whatever I do. This particular tour, for instance, I’ve really tried to put together all the elements, everything that I’ve been fascinated [with] in theater and rock, ever since the beginning of my career. It looks like the kind of show I really want to go and see myself. It's fast, colorful, vulgar, loud, subtle, quiet, dreamlike."

— David Bowie, early 1987

Demand for tickets to the tour was high: the 3 September show at Sullivan Stadium in Massachusetts set a record for quickest sellout at that venue, a record matched by U2 and unsurpassed until The Who sold 100,000 tickets to two shows there in less than eight hours in 1989. Star magazine reported that, for one venue, (Note: The source does not identify the exact venue for which the record-making sales occurred.) Bowie sold $3 million in tickets to three shows in 90 minutes. The concert drew the largest crowd ever to see a concert in Ottawa, Ontario, Canada at the time. Advance sales for the Australian leg of the tour was $8.6 million, surpassing even Michael Jackson's advance sales for the Australian leg of his "Bad" concert tour (estimated at $4.5 million). In the UK, ticket sales were made available via a relatively new ticket and credit card hotline, with one promoter estimating that 70% of tickets were sold that way. Ticket sales for the shows in Amsterdam were marred by "riots" in which some people were pushed through the windows of ticket offices in the crush to buy tickets.

Contemporary journalists estimated that by the conclusion of the tour between two and six million people had attended, and David Currie, the author of a book about the European leg of the tour, suggested that over three million fans saw the tour worldwide.

Four of the tour's shows were among the top 20 highest-grossing concert shows of 1987 in the US, and at the end of 1987 it was estimated that the entire tour grossed more than $50 million. In 1991, it was estimated that each show of the tour grossed $1 million, for roughly $86 million over the course of the tour, or approximately $244 million today, adjusted for inflation.

== Contemporary critical reviews ==
The European leg of the tour seemed to garner mostly unfavorable reviews from the media, although there were positive reviews as well. Chris Roberts, a writer for Melody Maker, later said that there was "overwhelming peer pressure" among his fellow musical critics to review the tour unfavourably. Bowie was frustrated how the reviews in Europe changed from initially positive to negative, blaming the early start of the tour in some outdoor venues for the poor reception. He said, "the biggest mistake that was made on that tour, was opening in the daylight. The whole reason for the entire damn show was lost." He noted that reviews from indoor shows, where the set and lighting were more effective, were quite positive.

"I think it's [The Glass Spider Tour] something that's very unique, and I think you either love it, or it's not your cup of tea."

— Peter Frampton, August 1987

The US media seemed kinder, with papers in Orlando, Florida and Boston, Massachusetts writing positive reviews. The Philadelphia Inquirer and Chicago Tribune were both mixed in their reviews. The review of Bowie's first show in New York was mostly negative, calling the show "spectacular", but adding that "overkill reigns" and lamenting "a dizzying overload of visual activity." A review in the Christian Science Monitor was mostly positive, highlighting the dazzling visuals and complaining that the dancing was only occasionally inspired. A local paper in Portland, Oregon had a positive review that said that the dancers, music, set and band combined into an "overall effect [that] could rightly be called spectacular. It is performance art and rock opera; it is a stunning assemblage worthy of any stage or arena in the world."

Despite criticism in the press, Bowie at the time said that performing on this tour was the most fun he had ever had on the road because it was the "most inventive" tour he had ever been involved with.

== Live recordings ==
Despite stating during the press tour that there would be no live album from the tour, the performances at Sydney Entertainment Centre – Sydney on 7 and 9 November 1987 were filmed and released on video as Glass Spider in 1988. An edit of this show was subsequently aired in the US in an ABC TV concert special, ABC's first concert special since airing Elvis Presley's Aloha from Hawaii in 1973. A 2007 DVD re-release of the show included an audio recording of the performance at Olympic Stadium, Montreal on 30 August 1987, which was re-mastered and released on Loving the Alien (1983–1988) (2018). The 6 June 1987 Platz der Republik (Reichstag – City of Berlin Festival) performance was broadcast live on FM radio.

One critic found that the 1988 and 2007 DVD reissue video releases rendered the intended meaning of the show largely nonsensical, as several songs and vignettes that made the show's message explicit were excised from the release. However Bowie biographer Nicholas Pegg said that the concert film was "hugely enjoyable" despite the show's flaws, and that the video "leads the field for those wishing to see David Bowie delivering a rock-theatre spectacular."

== Subsequent events ==
Bowie found himself under great stress during the tour, and after the tour ended in New Zealand, he reportedly had one of the Spider sets burned, saying "It was so great ... We just put the thing in a field and set light to it. That was such a relief!" In 2016, road manager Peter Grumley claimed to have purchased and stored at least one of the (unburned) sets in his West Auckland warehouse.

The entire tour was so physically demanding and such a large production that Bowie said at the time that "I don't think I'll ever take a tour quite this elaborate out on the road again. It's a real headache to put it together", and in a different contemporary interview, said "I would doubt that I would do something this complex this quickly again."

After the tour, Bowie expected to follow up with a movie appearance or two, (Note: Bowie was rumoured to have been in line for a role in the remake of Dirty Rotten Scoundrels with Mick Jagger but his next movie role was in The Last Temptation of Christ (1988).) and expected to go into the studio to record more music the following year.

Bowie became engaged to Melissa Hurley, one of the dancers from the tour, but the two split up without being wed after four years.

== Tour legacy ==
"[The Glass Spider Tour] was the first time I'd had the opportunity to spend that kind of money and do shows like that! The first time since Diamond Dogs, anyway ... I thought, Right! Let's really spend some money! I had all these thwarted dreams of what I'd tried to do with rock 'n roll in the early '70s, and I was trying to do all that a bit late."

— David Bowie, 1991

Critics have often compared later David Bowie tours to this one, commonly echoing this later review: "[Bowie] mounted a stadium-sized production combining the excitement of rock with the perils of Broadway. ... An incredible spectacle, but the effect was overwhelming. Each additional theatrical device served to distract, ultimately flattening the impact of the music."

In 1989 while working with Tin Machine, Bowie said "I overstretched. ... There was too much responsibility on the last [Glass Spider] tour. I was under stress every single day. It was a decision a second. It was so big and so unwieldy and everybody had a problem all the time, every day, and I was under so much pressure. It was unbelievable. ... I put too many fine details into something that was going to be seen (indicates tiny figure with his finger and thumb) this big."

In 1990, while giving interviews for his Sound+Vision Tour, Bowie said that he was pleased that the tour was regarded as "innovative", noting reviews that pointed out how the tour had "areas of it that surely would change the way rock was done."

In 1991, while preparing for his second tour with Tin Machine, Bowie reflected on the Glass Spider Tour's theatrics and presentation, suggesting that many tours and acts that followed benefited from this tour:

The Stones' show, Prince's show, Madonna's show... all of them have benefited from [this] tour. ... I like lots of it [the Glass Spider Tour], but ... the whole thing should have been a lot smaller. Three-quarters of it was really innovative, and I've seen a lot of it in other people's shows. ... One day, if you get the chance, get a copy of that show on video and take another look at it, because in the light of what's been done since, there's some interesting shit going on.

In the late 2000s, the tour began to be re-examined by critics, and the tone of the coverage began to change. In 2009, an article in the BBC News singled out the Glass Spider Tour's innovative set and marriage of music and theatre as an inspiration to later acts, including Britney Spears, Madonna, U2 and others. Stage designer Willie Williams said the Glass Spider Tour was a template for those acts: "There will be one set of costumes and they will do a few songs, then there will be another big scene change and move on to the next thing. Bowie crossing rock 'n' roll with Broadway [in the Glass Spider Tour] was where that began." In 2010, the Glass Spider Tour won an award for being one of the best concert designs of all time, alongside other such notable tours as U2's 360° Tour (2009–2011) and Pink Floyd's Division Bell Tour (1994).

"When we [toured for] Young Americans, they booed the hell out of that. Why? They [the fans] wanted Diamond Dogs [Bowie's previous album]. When we did "Serious Moonlight", they booed the hell out of that because they wanted the 70s stuff. When we did "Glass Spider", they wanted "Serious Moonlight". The audience was never going to catch up to the man."

— Carlos Alomar (2016), on the fans' and critics' mixed reaction to the Glass Spider Tour

In 2013, new critical reviews began to take note of some of the tour's strengths and innovations and proposed that the tour was better than its reputation suggested. Although critics still found some elements of the tour questionable, such as the set itself and the prevalence of Bowie's newer material, the tour was praised for Bowie's strong voice, musical arrangements and choice of relatively unheard "jewels" in the set list. Peter Frampton credited his participation in this tour for helping to revive his own career.

In 2017, a review in The Atlantic, while admitting that it had some flaws, called the show "spectacular, beautiful, charmingly pretentious, and weirdly magical."

The show on 6 June 1987 was played close to the Berlin Wall. The show was heard by thousands of East German citizens across the wall and was followed by violent rioting in East Berlin. According to German journalist Tobias Ruther, these protests in East Berlin were the first in the sequence of riots that led to the fall of the wall in November 1989. Although other factors were probably more influential in the fall of the wall, upon Bowie's death in 2016, the German Foreign Office tweeted "Good-bye, David Bowie. You are now among #Heroes. Thank you for helping to bring down the #wall."

Ultimately, given the negative reaction to the Never Let Me Down album and this tour, Bowie found himself creatively exhausted and in low critical standing. Bowie decided to return to making music for himself, and, having been put in touch with Reeves Gabrels through his publicist for the Glass Spider Tour, Bowie formed his band Tin Machine in 1989 and retired his back catalogue of songs from live performance with his Sound+Vision Tour in 1990.

== Tour details ==
=== Tour band ===
- David Bowie – vocals, guitar
- Peter Frampton – guitar, vocals
- Carlos Alomar – guitar, backing vocals, music director
- Carmine Rojas – bass guitar
- Alan Childs – drums
- Erdal Kızılçay – keyboards, trumpet, congas, violin, backing vocals
- Richard Cottle – keyboards, saxophone, tambourine, backing vocals

=== Guest performers ===
- Charlie Sexton – guitar, backing vocals (during the encore at some shows of the North America and Oceania tour)
- Earl Slick – guitar (during the encore at the Anaheim Stadium show)

=== Tour dancers ===
- Melissa Hurley
- Constance Marie
- Spazz Attack (Craig Allen Rothwell)
- Viktor Manoel
- Skeeter Rabbit (Stephen Nichols)
- Toni Basil (choreography)

=== Tour direction ===
- David Bowie – Direction, choreography, staging
- Toni Basil – Direction, choreography, staging

=== Tour design ===
- Allen Branton – Lighting design
- Mark Ravitz – Set design
- Christine Strand – Video director

=== Production ===
- Michael Ahern – Production Manager
- Tony Blanc – FOH Sound Engineer
- Chris Wade-Evans – Monitor Sound Engineer

=== Band equipment ===
Peter Frampton played two natural-finish maple body Pensa-Suhr Strat types, hand-made by New York-based John Suhr. For the song "Zeroes", he used a Coral electric sitar, given to him in the late '70s and previously owned by Jimi Hendrix. Carlos Alomar played on six Kramer American series guitars and one custom Alembic. (Note: In 2021, Alomar said that he only ever played his Alembic guitar on Bowie's albums and tours, and never for any other artist.) Multi-instrumentalist Erdal Kizilcay played Yamaha DX7, Emax, Korg SG-1 and Yamaha CS70 keyboards. He also played a Tokai Stratocaster, a Yamaha GS1000 bass and a Pedulla fretless bass. Additional instruments played included a set of Latin Percussion timbales and white congas, a cowbell, 6- and 8-inch Zildjian cymbals, Promark drum sticks, a Simmons SDS9, a cornet and a 17th-century Italian viola. Richard Cottle played on two Prophet 5s, an Oberheim, a Yamaha DX7, DX7-IID and KX5 keyboards as well as a Selmer alto saxophone. Carmine Rojas used two Spector basses, and Alan Childs played on Tama Artstar II drums and used various combinations of Zildjian A, K, and Platinum series cymbals.

=== Tour dates ===
Date (1987)	City	Country	Venue	Attendance
Promotional press shows
North America
17 March	Toronto	Canada	Diamond Club	
18 March	New York City	United States	Cat Club	
Europe
20 March	London	England	Player's Theatre	
21 March	Paris	France	La Locomotive	
24 March	Madrid	Spain	Halquera Plateaux	
25 March	Rome	Italy	Piper	
26 March	Munich	West Germany	Parkcafe Lowenbrau	
28 March	Stockholm	Sweden	Ritz	
30 March	Amsterdam	Netherlands	Paradiso	
Oceania
27 October	Sydney	Australia	Tivoli Club	
Glass Spider Tour
Europe
30 May	Rotterdam	Netherlands	Stadion Feijenoord	60,000
31 May	Rotterdam	Netherlands	Stadion Feijenoord	60,000
2 June	Werchter	Belgium	Werchter festival ground	
6 June	West Berlin	West Germany	Platz der Republik	80,000
7 June	Nürburgring	West Germany	Rock am Ring	
9 June	Florence	Italy	Stadio Comunale	50,000 – 65,000
10 June	Milan	Italy	Stadio San Siro	60,000
13 June	Hamburg	West Germany	Festwiese Am Stadtpark	
15 June	Rome	Italy	Stadio Flaminio	40, 000
16 June	Rome	Italy	Stadio Flaminio	40, 000
19 June	London	England	Wembley Stadium	70,000
20 June	London	England	Wembley Stadium	70,000
21 June	Cardiff	Wales	National Stadium	50,000
23 June	Sunderland	England	Roker Park	36,000
27 June	Gothenburg	Sweden	Eriksbergsvarvet	45,000
28 June	Lyon	France	Stade de Gerland	30,000
1 July	Vienna	Austria	Praterstadion	
3 July	Paris	France	Parc départemental de La Courneuve	
4 July	Toulouse	France	Stadium Municipal	
6 July	Madrid	Spain	Vicente Calderón Stadium	
7 July	Barcelona	Spain	Mini Estadi	17,000
8 July	Barcelona	Spain	Mini Estadi	17,000
11 July	Slane	Ireland, Republic of	Slane Concert	50,000
14 July	Manchester	England	Maine Road	
15 July	Manchester	England	Maine Road	
17 July	Nice	France	Stade De L'Ouest	
18 July	Turin	Italy	Stadio Comunale di Torino	
North America
30 July	Philadelphia	United States	Veterans Stadium	50,000
31 July	Philadelphia	United States	Veterans Stadium	
2 August	East Rutherford	United States	Giants Stadium	
3 August	East Rutherford	United States	Giants Stadium	
7 August	San Jose	United States	Spartan Stadium	29,000
8 August	Anaheim	United States	Anaheim Stadium	50,000
9 August	Anaheim	United States	Anaheim Stadium	
12 August	Denver	United States	Mile High Stadium	
14 August	Portland	United States	Civic Stadium	
15 August	Vancouver	Canada	BC Place Stadium	35,000
17 August	Edmonton	Canada	Commonwealth Stadium	60,000
19 August	Winnipeg	Canada	Winnipeg Stadium	25,000
21 August	Rosemont	United States	Rosemont Horizon	
22 August	Rosemont	United States	Rosemont Horizon	
24 August	Toronto	Canada	Canadian National Exhibition Stadium	
25 August	Toronto	Canada	Canadian National Exhibition Stadium	
28 August	Ottawa	Canada	Lansdowne Park	29,000
30 August	Montreal	Canada	Olympic Stadium	45,000
1 September	New York City	United States	Madison Square Garden	
2 September	New York City	United States	Madison Square Garden	
3 September	Foxborough	United States	Sullivan Stadium	61,000
6 September	Chapel Hill	United States	Dean Smith Center	
7 September	Chapel Hill	United States	Dean Smith Center	
10 September	Milwaukee	United States	Marcus Amphitheater	
11 September	Milwaukee	United States	Marcus Amphitheater	
12 September	Pontiac	United States	Pontiac Silverdome	
14 September	Lexington	United States	Rupp Arena	
18 September	Miami	United States	Miami Orange Bowl	
19 September	Tampa	United States	Tampa Stadium	
21 September	Atlanta	United States	Omni Coliseum	
22 September	Atlanta	United States	Omni Coliseum	
25 September	Hartford	United States	Hartford Civic Center	
28 September	Landover	United States	Capital Centre	
29 September	Landover	United States	Capital Centre	
1 October	Saint Paul	United States	St. Paul Civic Center	
2 October	Saint Paul	United States	St. Paul Civic Center	
4 October	Kansas City	United States	Kemper Arena	
6 October	New Orleans	United States	Louisiana Superdome	
7 October	Houston	United States	The Summit	
8 October	Houston	United States	The Summit	
10 October	Dallas	United States	Reunion Arena	
11 October	Dallas	United States	Reunion Arena	
13 October	Los Angeles	United States	Dodger Stadium	
14 October	Los Angeles	United States	Dodger Stadium	
Oceania
29 October	Brisbane	Australia	Boondall Entertainment Centre	
30 October	Brisbane	Australia	Boondall Entertainment Centre	
3 November	Sydney	Australia	Sydney Entertainment Centre	
4 November	Sydney	Australia	Sydney Entertainment Centre	
6 November	Sydney	Australia	Sydney Entertainment Centre	
7 November	Sydney	Australia	Sydney Entertainment Centre	
9 November	Sydney	Australia	Sydney Entertainment Centre	
10 November	Sydney	Australia	Sydney Entertainment Centre	
13 November	Sydney	Australia	Sydney Entertainment Centre	
14 November	Sydney	Australia	Sydney Entertainment Centre	
18 November	Melbourne	Australia	Kooyong Stadium	
20 November	Melbourne	Australia	Kooyong Stadium	
21 November	Melbourne	Australia	Kooyong Stadium	
23 November	Melbourne	Australia	Kooyong Stadium	
28 November	Auckland	New Zealand	Western Springs Stadium	

=== The songs ===
From The Man Who Sold the World

- "All the Madmen"

From Aladdin Sane

- "The Jean Genie"
- "Time"

From Ziggy Stardust: The Motion Picture

- "White Light/White Heat" (originally from White Light/White Heat (1968) by The Velvet Underground; written by Lou Reed)

From Diamond Dogs

- "Big Brother"
- "Chant of the Ever Circling Skeletal Family"
- "Rebel Rebel"

From Young Americans

- "Fame" (Bowie, John Lennon, Carlos Alomar)
- "Young Americans"

From "Heroes"

- "'Heroes'" (Bowie, Brian Eno)
- "Sons of the Silent Age"

From Scary Monsters (And Super Creeps)

- "Fashion"
- "Scary Monsters (And Super Creeps)"
- "Up the Hill Backwards"

From Let's Dance

- "China Girl" (originally from The Idiot by Iggy Pop, written by Pop and Bowie)
- "Let's Dance"
- "Modern Love"

From Tonight

- "Blue Jean"
- "Dancing With the Big Boys" (Bowie, Pop, Carlos Alomar)
- "Loving the Alien"

From Never Let Me Down

- "'87 and Cry"
- "Bang Bang" (Pop, Ivan Kral)
- "Beat of Your Drum"
- "Day-In Day-Out"
- "Glass Spider"
- "Never Let Me Down" (Bowie, Alomar)
- "New York's in Love"
- "Time Will Crawl"
- "Zeroes"

Other songs:

- "Absolute Beginners" (from Absolute Beginners)
- "I Wanna Be Your Dog" (from The Stooges (1969) by The Stooges, written by Pop, Dave Alexander, Ron Asheton and Scott Asheton)
- "Lavender's Blue" (traditional)
- "London Bridge Is Falling Down" (traditional)
- "War" (from War & Peace (1970) by Edwin Starr; written by Norman Whitfield and Barrett Strong)
- "Who Will Buy?" (from the musical Oliver!)

Rehearsed, but not performed:

- "Because You're Young" (from Scary Monsters (and Super Creeps))
- "Scream Like a Baby" (from Scary Monsters (and Super Creeps))
- "Shining Star (Makin' My Love)" (from Never Let Me Down)

== See also ==
- Highest-grossing concert tours of the 1980s
