= Inspirations (film) =

- Directed by: Michael Apted
- Produced by: Jody Allen; Michael Apted; Eileen Gregory; Paul Allen
- Starring: Tadao Ando; David Bowie; Dale Chihuly; Louise LeCavalier; Roy Lichtenstein; Édouard Lock; Nora Naranjo-Morse
- Cinematography: Maryse Alberti; Amnon Zlayet
- Edited by: Susanne Rostock
- Music by: Patrick Seymour
- Production companies: Argo Films; Clear Blue Sky Productions
- Release date: 1997
- Running time: 100 min.
- Countries: United States; Israel
- Language: English

Inspirations is a 1997 documentary directed by Michael Apted.

== Synopsis ==
The film explores creativity in the arts through interviews with several prominent figures known for a variety of artistic media:

- Musician David Bowie.
- Pop artist Roy Lichtenstein.
- Glass sculptor Dale Chihuly.
- Dance choreographer Édouard Lock.
- Dancer Louise LeCavalier.
- Potter/poet Nora Naranjo-Morse.
- Architect Tadao Ando.
