= Viktor Manoel =

American actor

- Manoel in 2002
- Born: 1957 (age 68–69); Mexico
- Occupations: Dancer, choreographer, writer, actor

Viktor Manoel (born 1957) is a Mexican–American dancer, choreographer, writer, and actor.

Manoel was born and raised in Mexico. He worked with such choreographers as Édouard Lock of Canadian dance group La La La Human Steps and Toni Basil. Basil hired him for David Bowie's world stadium Glass Spider Tour after she spotted him performing in a LA nightclub in 1987.

Manoel has performed in numerous shows including Open Doors and Whistle Revisited (based on Stephen Sondheim's Anyone Can Whistle), as well as with Grace Jones, and Canadian singer Norman Iceberg.

Viktor Manoel has also appeared in film such as Staying Alive (1983) directed by Sylvester Stallone, Breakin' 2: Electric Boogaloo (1984), Glass Spider (1988) directed by David Mallet, and Female Perversions (1997) directed by Susan Streitfeld.

As a cyclist, Manoel has raised significant funds for many organizations taking part in different AIDS rides and marathons of various distances across North America each year.
