= Louise Lecavalier =

Canadian dancer

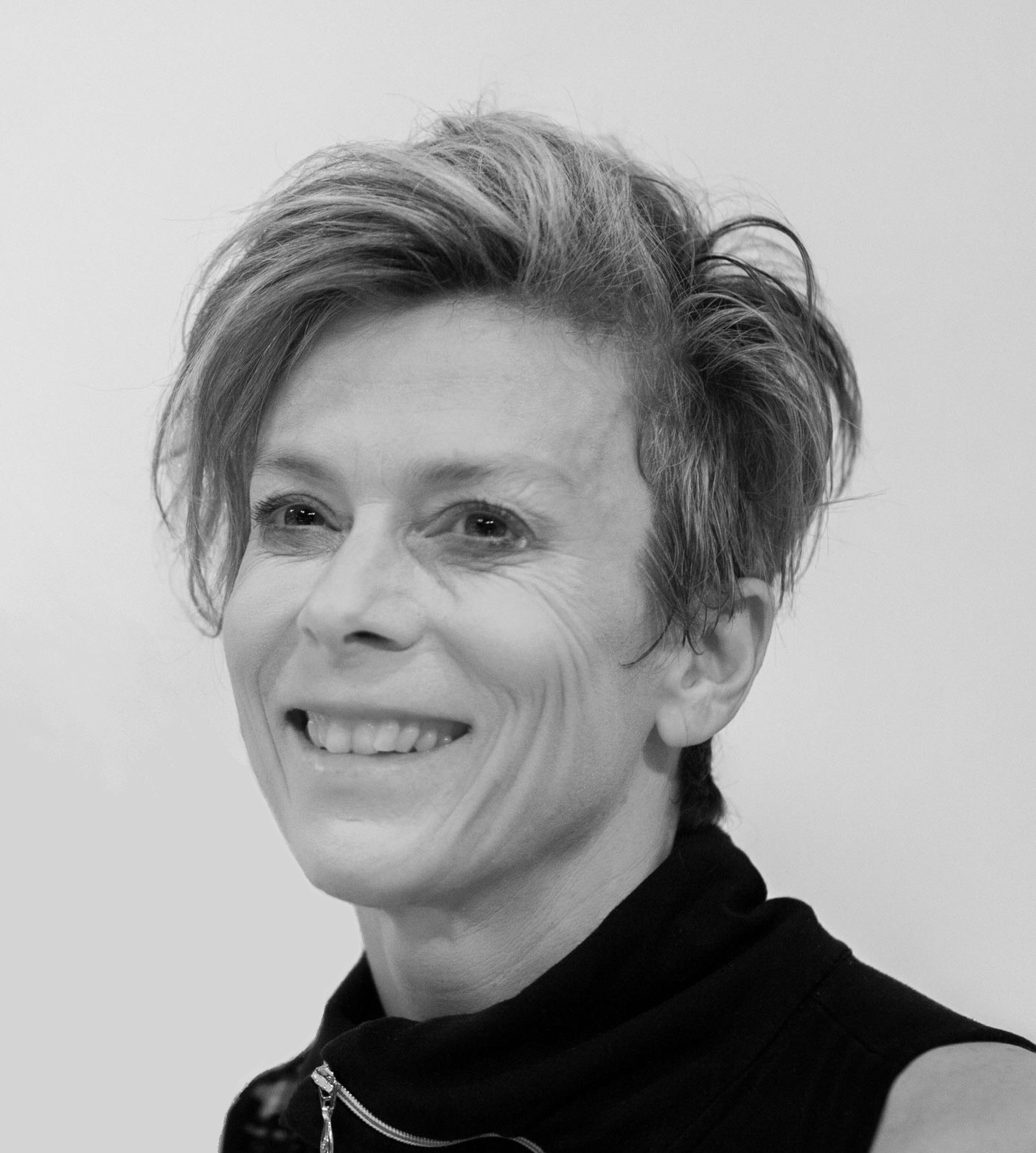
- Lecavalier (2012)
- Born: October 3, 1958 (age 67); Montreal, Quebec, Canada
- Occupations: Dancer; choreographer
- Years active: 1977–present
- Career
- Former groups: Le Groupe Nouvelle Aire; Pointépiénu; La La La Human Steps
- Dances: Contemporary dance
- Website: louiselecavalier.com

Louise Lecavalier OC (born October 3, 1958) is a Canadian dancer known as one of the icons of Canadian contemporary dance.

== Biography ==
Lecavalier was born and raised in Montreal, Quebec. She began her professional dance career at the age of eighteen when she joined Le Groupe Nouvelle Aire. It was there that she met Édouard Lock.

Lecavalier became Lock's main character and inspiration in his company La La La Human Steps. With her mane of platinum dreadlocks, her physical power and her mastery of the full-body barrel jump – a gravity-defying, fully horizontal, mid-air barrel roll – her image was a signature for the company. She was the embodiment of Lock's frenetic and technically challenging androgynous aesthetic in works such as Human Sex (1985) and Infante, c'est destroy (1991).

She joined La La La Human Steps in 1981 for its production of Oranges and went on to perform in each of the company's productions up until Salt in 1998.

In 1985, Lecavalier became the first Canadian to win a Bessie Award in New York for her performance in Businessman in the Process of Becoming an Angel (1983). The Times critic found Lock's "extravagant" play poor but stated that there were

... two women who seemed quite skilled at performing various odd dance steps; the fair-haired one [Louise Lecavalier] had a pleasing bravado whenever the production gave her half a chance."

She danced in Human Sex (1985), New Demons (1987), Infante, c'est destroy (1991) and finally, 2 (1995) and Salt (1998).

Lecavalier also participated in each of La La La's major collaborations, including David Bowie's Sound+Vision Tour in 1990 and Fame '90 music video, The Yellow Shark concerts, performed by Frank Zappa and Germany's Ensemble Modern in Frankfurt, Berlin, and Vienna in 1992, and the film Inspirations from director Michael Apted in 1996.

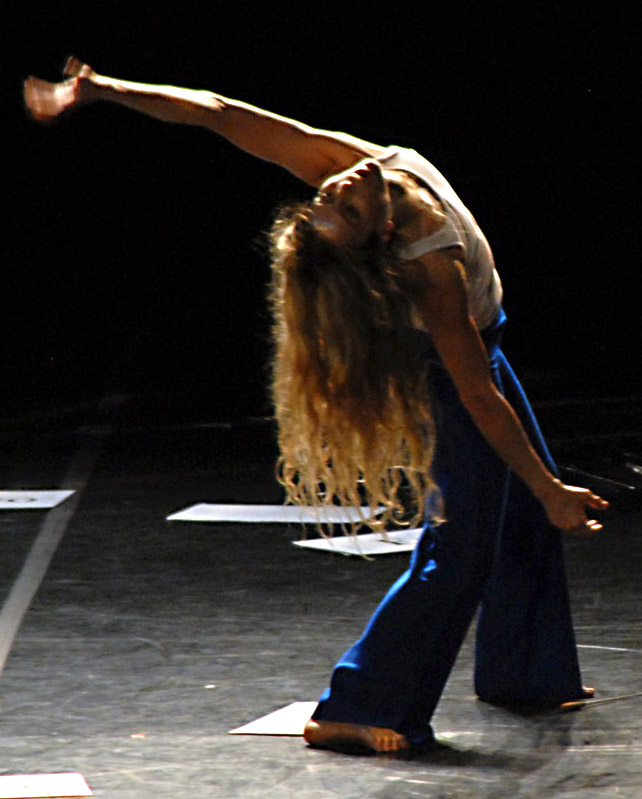
Lecavalier performing in 2007

In May 1999, Lecavalier received the Jean A. Chalmers National Award, Canada's most distinguished dance prize.

In 2003, she appeared with Tedd Robinson in Lula and the Sailor as part of a concert of duets choreographed by Robinson. In the winter of 2005, she co-produced Cobalt Rouge with the National Arts Centre in Ottawa, the Biennale di Venezia and Théâtre de la Ville in Paris. The work features Lecavalier with dancers Marc Boivin, Masaharu Imazu, and Tedd Robinson, and musician/composer Yannick Rieu.

Lecavalier has been a guest teacher at New York University on several occasions and continues to perform as an independent artist.

In 2008, she was made an Officer of the Order of Canada.

On April 7, 2010, she was awarded the Order of Canada. On December 7, 2012, her piece "So Blue" premiered in Düsseldorf. It was her first dance choreography. In May 2014, Lecavalier received the Governor General's Performing Arts Award for Lifetime Artistic Achievement in dance. The award is Canada's highest honour in the performing arts.

== Notable performances ==
- Oranges (1981)
- Businessman in the Process of Becoming an Angel (1983)
- Human Sex (1985)
- New Demons (1987)
- Infante, C'est destroy (1991)
- 2 (1995)
- Salt (1998)
- Lula and the Sailor
- Cobalt Rouge (2005)
- Children (2010) L.L. / Fou Glorieux
- So Blue (2012) L.L. / Fou Glorieux
- Danses vagabondes (2025) L.L. / Fou Glorieux

== Movies and videos ==
- 1982 The Mondo Beyondo Show (TV)
- 1989 Carole Laure's "Danse avant de tomber" as Dancer
- 1990 David Bowie's "Fame '90" music video as Dancer
- 1992 The Yellow Shark by Frank Zappa (TV)
- 1994 Velasquez's Little Museum as Dancer
- 1995 Pour tout dire as Module 3
- 1995 Pour tout dire as Module 4
- 1995 Strange Days as Cindy 'Vita' Minh
- 1997 Inspirations as Herself

== See also ==
- La La La Human Steps
