= Sound+Vision Tour =

1990 concert tour by David Bowie

- Tour by David Bowie
- Promotional poster for the tour
- Location: Europe; North America; Asia; South America
- Associated album: Sound+Vision
- Start date: 4 March 1990
- End date: 29 September 1990
- Legs: 7
- No. of shows: 7 in North America; 23 in Europe; 7 in North America; 2 in Asia; 40 in North America; 24 in Europe; 6 in South America; 108 in total

David Bowie concert chronology
- The Glass Spider Tour (1987); Sound+Vision Tour (1990); The Outside Tour (1995–96)

The Sound+Vision Tour was a 1990 concert tour by the English musician David Bowie that was billed as a greatest hits tour in which Bowie would retire his back catalogue of hit songs from live performance. The tour opened at the Colisée de Québec in Quebec City, Canada on 4 March 1990 before reaching its conclusion at the River Plate Stadium in Buenos Aires, Argentina on 29 September 1990, spanning five continents in seven months. The concert tour surpassed Bowie's previous Serious Moonlight (1983) and Glass Spider (1987) tours' statistics by visiting 27 countries with 108 performances.

== Tour history ==
Bowie's previous Glass Spider Tour and two most recent albums (Tonight (1984) and Never Let Me Down (1987)) had all been critically dismissed, and Bowie was looking for a way to rejuvenate himself artistically. To this end, Bowie wanted to avoid having to play his old hits live forever, and used the release of the Sound + Vision box set as the impetus for a tour, despite having no new material recorded. Bowie took a break from his band Tin Machine for "Sound+Vision", telling the band he was contractually obligated to do the tour. He invited fellow Tin Machine guitarist Reeves Gabrels to tour with him, but Gabrels declined, and instead suggested Adrian Belew, with whom both Gabrels and Bowie had worked previously. Gabrels called Belew and said “'I have this friend who is going on tour, and he needs a guitar player. He asked me and I can’t do it, but I thought you might want to do it,' and I put David on the phone."

It was stated that Bowie would never perform these greatest hits on tour again. Bowie said "knowing I won't ever have those songs to rely on again spurs me to keep doing new things, which is good for an artist," and later, "I have no intentions of parroting my own songs, which is what it ends up being after you've been doing it for 20 years. You can't do it with any more enthusiasm. I don't care who you are, you get to the point where you don't like singing the song anymore."

Bowie looked forward to retiring his old hits, saying "It's time to put about 30 or 40 songs to bed and it's my intention that this will be the last time I'll ever do those songs completely, because if I want to make a break from what I've done up until now, I've got to make it concise and not have it as a habit to drop back into. It's so easy to kind of keep going on and saying, well, you can rely on those songs, you can rely on that to have a career or something, and I'm not sure I want that."

He would state in another contemporary interview that "I want to finish off that old phase and start again. By the time I'm in my later forties, I will have built up a whole new repertoire."

It has been noted that Bowie is "famous" for claiming retirement in the past, so many critics and observers did not fully believe Bowie when he said he would not play these songs again.

Bowie spent the early few months of 1990 preparing for the tour in a rehearsal hall on Manhattan's west side.

== Song selection ==
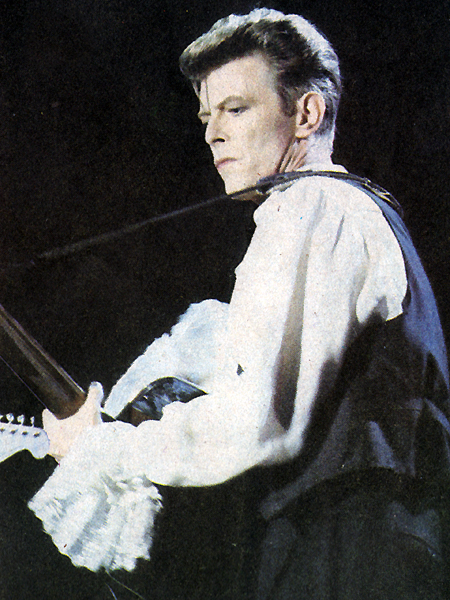
David Bowie performing in Chile, 27 September 1990

It was announced that the set-list for any given performance of the tour would be partially determined by the most popular titles logged in a telephone poll by calling the premium-rate telephone number 1-900-2-BOWIE-90. Money earned from phone calls to the number were donated to two charities, Save the Children and a Brixton charity. Mail-in ballots were made available to vote by in territories where telephone technology was not available.

Bowie did in fact build the tour's setlist from calls to the phone number from all over the world, saying "What I ended up doing was taking about seven or eight [songs] from [the calls in] England, another seven or eight from the rest of Europe and the rest I made up from America so it's a good sampling of what everybody wanted in all the continents." The first shows of the tour held in March 1990 in Canada were performed before any telephone polls were completed, leading Bowie to guess at the list of songs the audience wanted to hear.

In the US, the songs "Fame", "Let's Dance" and "Changes" topped the list of songs requested by fans, while in Europe the songs "'Heroes'" and "Blue Jean" were the leaders.

NME, in response to the telephone poll, ran a spoof campaign, Just Say Gnome, in an effort to have "The Laughing Gnome" included in the set-lists. Bowie had considered playing "The Laughing Gnome" in the style of The Velvet Underground until he found out the voting had been perpetrated by the music magazine.

== Set design ==
Édouard Lock (of La La La Human Steps) co-conceived and was artistic director for this tour. Bowie had originally wanted La La La Human Steps to be involved in his previous Glass Spider Tour, but was unable to secure them due to scheduling conflicts. Given the unfavorable attention that his previous solo tour drew, Bowie was keen to make sure the Sound+Vision Tour did things differently. He said, "It will be staged; there is no way I could ever consider really putting something on the stage that doesn't owe something to theatah (pronouncing 'theatre' in a thick British accent), but it won't be overtly theatre in as much as it won't be propped the same way. Going back to the way we worked towards the Station to Station show, which was basically a question of using a kind of Brechtian lighting pad and working areas and atmospheres of light, is very much the kind of feel it will have." Bowie recruited Willie Williams to design the lighting for the tour, having worked with him on the preceding year's "Tin Machine Tour".

He added that this tour is "nowhere near as ambitious as Glass Spider in size, but qualitatively, in essence, I think it's as theatrical."

In addition to the stark lighting and the backing 4-piece rock band, Bowie employed a new tool for this tour: a giant sixty-by-forty foot transparent gauze scrim. The scrim would occasionally be lowered in front of or behind Bowie, onto which images of Bowie and videos were projected. Bowie described it as being "like a giant Javanese shadow puppet show at times." Two large, round screens at each side of the stage also displayed the videos projected on the scrim.

The set was constructed by 80 workers who traveled with the tour, with the help of local workers who were hired in each city. A single set took 8 trucks to move (with an additional 4 buses for the workers), and required 9 hours to set up and 4 hours to load out each night.

Video recordings of La La La Human Steps' Louise Lecavalier performing dances in time to the music and images of Bowie singing, playing instruments, miming or otherwise performing to certain songs were projected on the scrim & screens during the show. For some dates, such as the performance in Montreal on 6 March 1990, some of the dancers from La La La Human Steps danced live on stage to some of the songs. Bowie was enthusiastic about the inclusion of the dancers on the tour: "You've never seen anything like them before. They're probably the leading avant-garde dance troupe in North America. Louise Lecavalier, their star, is like nothing else you've ever seen on stage. She's absolutely phenomenal. ... The dance troupe is unbelievable. It's where punk and ballet clash with each other."

== Fame '90 ==
With no new material recorded, to coincide with the tour, Bowie released an updated remix of his 1975 single "Fame", titled "Fame '90". He had wanted to remix one of his successful US singles, and "Let's Dance" was considered, but was rejected as Bowie thought it too recent. For the music video, he danced with Louise Lecavalier, one of the main dancers of La La La Human Steps. A remix of the song was included on the soundtrack for the movie Pretty Woman (1990), and the US version of the video replaces some of Bowie's music videos for scenes from the movie.

== Live recordings ==
Bowie wanted to record the concert, something he hadn't always done before, saying "We're intending to film it for posterity; I should hope so. I've always regretted not having filmed things like the 'Diamond Dogs' show. We never filmed the 'Station to Station' show. Or the 'soul' show with Dave Sanborn and those guys. I have absolutely no footage of those things. It's terrible. ... It's infuriating."

Despite this, no official recording of the show has been made available to the public in either audio or video form. A number of performances were filmed and recorded for television and radio broadcasts:

Recording date	Location	Broadcast by
16 May 1990	Tokyo Dome	
5 August 1990	Milton Keynes Bowl	BBC Radio 1
14 September 1990	Estádio José Alvalade	RTP1
20 September 1990	Sambodromo de Rio – Rio de Janeiro	Rede Globo
23 September 1990	Estadio de Palmeiras – São Paulo	Radio Transamérica
27 September 1990	Rock in Chile Festival – Estadio Nacional de Chile	

== Contemporary reception and reviews ==
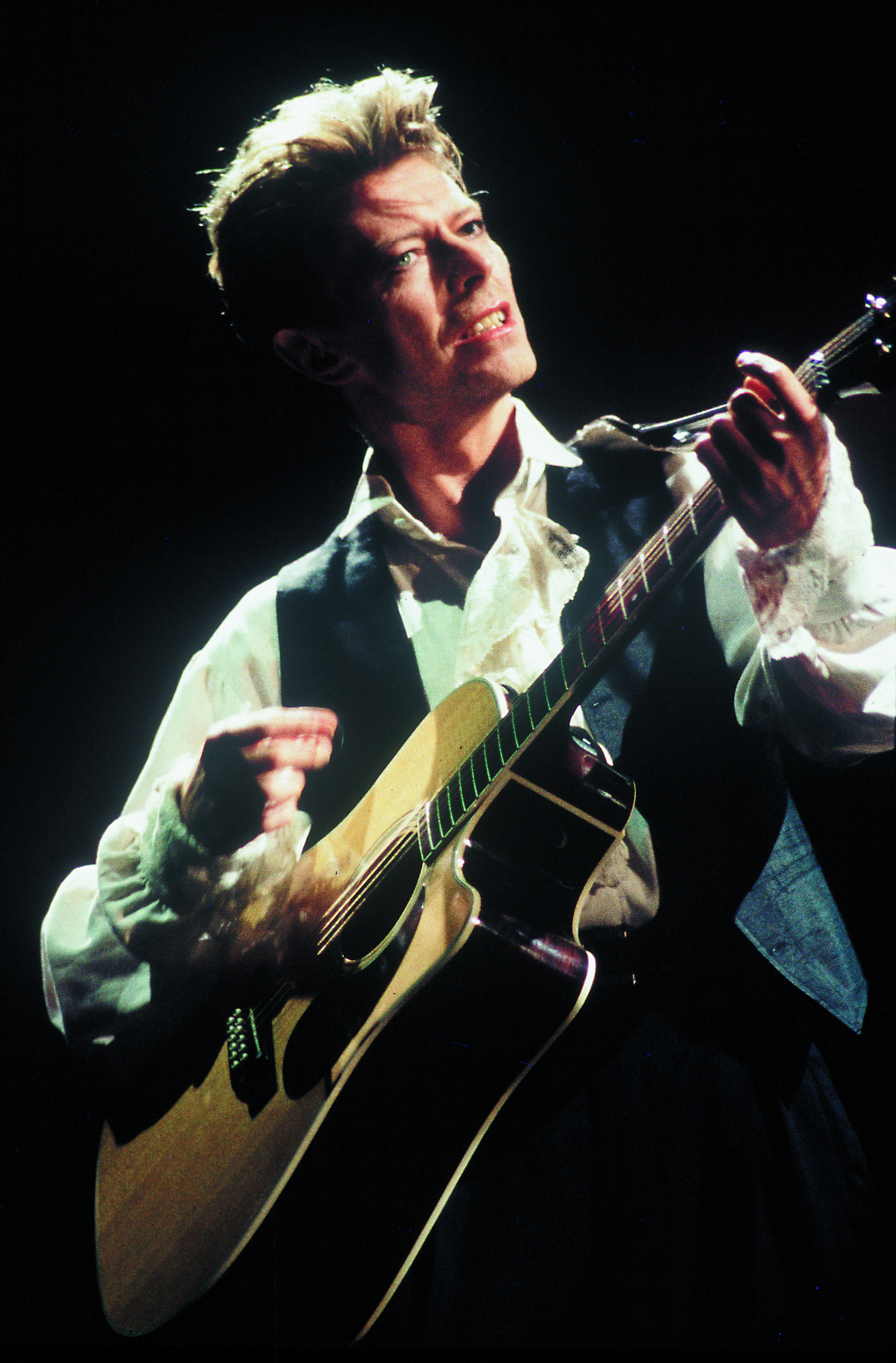
Bowie performing in Zagreb, Croatia, Yugoslavia

Rolling Stone described the 1990 summer concert season "a concert season to remember", and included the Sound+Vision Tour as one of its highlights. They said "Louise Lecavalier of Montreal's La La La Human Steps dance troupe provides avant-garde acrobatics, and several [musical] numbers are graced by stunning short films, including a clip for "Ashes to Ashes" that has to be seen to be believed. Otherwise, there are no pyrotechnics, no laser beams and, best of all, no glass spiders," the last a reference to Bowie's previous world tour. A review of an early show by Rolling Stone was positive, saying "Bowie proved able to reclaim virtually his entire diverse oeuvre – even those songs that now seem furthest from him – through sheer vocal power and charisma" and complaining only that "the band wasn't always equal to the challenge, demonstrating too much respect for the songs' recorded arrangements." A review of the show's stop in Vancouver, BC said "Bowie hasn't sounded this good in years", praising the tour's focus on not only the songs, but on Bowie himself, and a review of the show in Seattle called the visuals "a knockout" and praised Bowie as an innovator, only complaining that the music itself seemed "mechanical."

While some shows on the North American tour did not sell out, such as in Seattle and some dates in Florida, overall the tour was well-attended. It sold out, often over multiple nights, in cities such as San Francisco, Sacramento, Philadelphia and Detroit.

The UK show at Milton Keynes Bowl was reviewed negatively by Melody Maker magazine, who called parts of the performance "flat" and dismissed the song "Pretty Pink Rose" as "a tall heap of shite."

== Tour incidents ==
Mid-tour, Bowie, Erdal Kızılçay and guitarist Adrian Belew joined blues artist Buddy Guy in Chicago for a performance at Guy's Legends Night Club, which coincided with the NAMM Expo, where Guy was celebrated.

A month later in Philadelphia, Bowie stopped his performance in the middle of the song "Young Americans" to speak out against music censorship, specifically due to the controversy over 2 Live Crew's album As Nasty As They Wanna Be, saying "I've been listening to the album by 2 Live Crew. It's not the best album that's ever been made, but when I heard they banned it, I went out and bought it. Freedom of thought, freedom of speech – it's one of the most important things we have."

The concert in Zagreb, Yugoslavia, held on 5 September 1990, was the city's last great concert before the country descended into war and broke up.

During the show in Modena a few days later, Bowie stopped his performance while in the middle of "Station to Station" and said onstage "Ok, I'm gonna have to pick some easier songs, or I'm never gonna get through half of these... Let's try Fame." then Bowie proceeded to take his guitar and throw it at the other side of the stage. It is said that Bowie had a cold and he became frustrated that it was affecting his vocals.

== Tour statistics ==
The tour opened at the Colisée de Québec – Quebec City on 4 March 1990 before reaching its conclusion in Buenos Aires, Argentina on 29 September 1990, spanning five continents in seven months. The concert tour surpassed the previous Serious Moonlight and Glass Spider Tour's statistics by visiting 27 countries with 108 performances. For the ten performances in the United Kingdom alone it was estimated the audience figure was 250,000 in total. The tour was estimated to have grossed $20M (or roughly $49M today, adjusted for inflation).

== Tour legacy ==
Bowie felt that a burden had been lifted by retiring the old hits he felt he was forced to perform, and said "[Retiring my old hits on tour] was a very selfish thing to do, but it gave me an immense sense of freedom, to feel that I couldn't rely on any of those things. It's like I'm approaching it all from the ground up now, starting with 'Okay, we know what songs we needn't do anymore. What, of my past, did I really like?' You pick things that were really good songs, and you try to recontextualize them, by giving them current, contemporary rhythms. And we've been knocking around ideas like 'Shopping for Girls' from Tin Machine, 'Repetition' and 'Quicksand' from Hunky Dory. Certain songs that I probably haven't ever performed onstage. They're working shoulder to shoulder with the new material, and I'm starting to see continuity in the way that I work."

Generally, most songs that Bowie performed on the tour were played live in years to come, with only a small number of songs from the Sound+Vision Tour set list truly being retired forever; the most notable songs never to be played live again were "Young Americans", "TVC 15" and "Rock 'n' Roll Suicide". Bowie only played "Space Oddity" on tour a single time afterwards, in 2002, although Bowie did perform the song on two other occasions; in 1997 at his 50th birthday show and in 2001 at a Tibet House benefit. For the rest of the decade, Bowie would in fact tend to play his lesser-known songs, only occasionally punctuated by his well-known older "hits", and bias towards playing material written after 1990; it wasn't until 2000, around the time of his appearance at the Glastonbury Festival (released in 2018 as Glastonbury 2000), that he regularly started performing his older songs on tour again.

After the end of the Sound+Vision tour, Bowie returned to his band Tin Machine for their second album.

== Tour band ==
Bowie specifically chose a smaller band for the tour, saying in a contemporary interview that "It's a much smaller sound. It's not quite as orchestrated as any of the other tours. The plus of that is that there is a certain kind of drive and tightness that you get with that embryonic line-up, where everybody is totally reliant on the other two or three guys, so everybody gives a lot more." There was some tension in the band during the tour, remembered musician Kızılçay, who recalled that Bowie "wasn't very happy," and that "[Bowie] was very stressed, especially in South America. He didn’t even come to the sound checks. Keyboardist Rick Fox wasn't invested in the tour; he would occasionally eat dinner on stage, and on at least one occasion turned off his own keyboards and played his own songs while sampled parts of Bowie's songs were playing.

- David Bowie – vocals, guitar, saxophone
- Adrian Belew – guitar, backing vocals, music director
- Erdal Kızılçay – bass guitar, backing vocals
- Rick Fox – keyboards, backing vocals
- Michael Hodges – drums

== Setlist ==
This performance is from the Milton Keynes Bowl, Milton Keynes, England show at 5 August 1990.

1. "Space Oddity"
2. "Rebel Rebel"
3. "Ashes to Ashes"
4. "Fashion"
5. "Life on Mars?"
6. "Pretty Pink Rose"
7. "Sound and Vision"
8. "Blue Jean"
9. "Let's Dance"
10. "Stay"
11. "Ziggy Stardust"
12. "China Girl"
13. "Station to Station"
14. "Young Americans"
15. "Suffragette City"
16. "Fame"
17. "'Heroes'"
  Encore
18. "Changes"
19. "The Jean Genie"
20. "White Light/White Heat"
21. "Modern Love"

== Tour dates ==
Date	City	Country	Venue
North America
4 March 1990	Quebec City	Canada	Colisée de Québec
6 March 1990	Montreal	Canada	Montreal Forum
7 March 1990	Toronto	Canada	Skydome
10 March 1990	Winnipeg	Canada	Winnipeg Arena
12 March 1990	Edmonton	Canada	Northlands Coliseum
13 March 1990	Calgary	Canada	Olympic Saddledome
15 March 1990	Vancouver	Canada	BC Place
Europe
19 March 1990	Birmingham	England	National Exhibition Centre
20 March 1990	Birmingham	England	National Exhibition Centre
23 March 1990	Edinburgh	Scotland	Royal Highland Exhibition Centre
24 March 1990	Edinburgh	Scotland	Royal Highland Exhibition Centre
26 March 1990	London	England	Docklands Arena
27 March 1990	London	England	Docklands Arena
28 March 1990	London	England	Docklands Arena
30 March 1990	Rotterdam	Netherlands	Rotterdam Ahoy
1 April 1990	Dortmund	West Germany	(Rescheduled) Westfalenhalle
2 April 1990	Paris	France	Palais Omnisports de Paris Bercy
3 April 1990	Paris	France	Palais Omnisports de Paris Bercy
5 April 1990	Frankfurt	West Germany	Festhalle Frankfurt
7 April 1990	Hamburg	West Germany	Alsterdorfer Sporthalle
8 April 1990	West Berlin	West Germany	Deutschlandhalle
10 April 1990	Munich	West Germany	Olympiahalle
11 April 1990	Stuttgart	West Germany	Hanns-Martin-Schleyer-Halle
13 April 1990	Milan	Italy	PalaTrussardi
14 April 1990	Milan	Italy	PalaTrussardi
17 April 1990	Rome	Italy	Palaeur
~~18 April 1990~~	Rome	Italy	(Cancelled) Palaeur
20 April 1990	Brussels	Belgium	Forest National
21 April 1990	Brussels	Belgium	Forest National
22 April 1990	Dortmund	West Germany	Westfalenhalle
North America
27 April 1990	Miami	United States	Miami Arena
29 April 1990	Pensacola	United States	Pensacola Civic Center
1 May 1990	Orlando	United States	Orlando Arena
4 May 1990	St. Petersburg	United States	Florida Suncoast Dome
5 May 1990	Jacksonville	United States	Jacksonville Memorial Coliseum
7 May 1990	Atlanta	United States	Omni Coliseum
9 May 1990	Chapel Hill	United States	Dean Smith Center
Asia
15 May 1990	Tokyo	Japan	Tokyo Dome
16 May 1990	Tokyo	Japan	Tokyo Dome
North America
20 May 1990	Vancouver	Canada	BC Place Stadium
21 May 1990	Tacoma	United States	Tacoma Dome
23 May 1990	Los Angeles	United States	Los Angeles Memorial Sports Arena
24 May 1990	Sacramento	United States	Cal Expo
26 May 1990	Los Angeles	United States	Dodger Stadium
28 May 1990	Mountain View	United States	Shoreline Amphitheatre
29 May 1990	Mountain View	United States	Shoreline Amphitheatre
1 June 1990	Denver	United States	McNichols Sports Arena
2 June 1990	Denver	United States	McNichols Sports Arena
4 June 1990	Dallas	United States	Starplex Amphitheater
6 June 1990	Austin, Texas	United States	Frank Erwin Center
7 June 1990	Houston	United States	Woodlands Pavilion
9 June 1990	Kansas City	United States	Sandstone Amphitheater
10 June 1990	St. Louis	United States	St. Louis Arena
12 June 1990	Noblesville	United States	Deer Creek Music Center
13 June 1990	Milwaukee	United States	Marcus Amphitheater
15 June 1990	Chicago	United States	World Music Theatre
16 June 1990	Chicago	United States	World Music Theatre
19 June 1990	Cleveland	United States	Richfield Coliseum
20 June 1990	Cleveland	United States	Richfield Coliseum
22 June 1990	Auburn Hills	United States	The Palace of Auburn Hills
24 June 1990	Auburn Hills	United States	The Palace of Auburn Hills
25 June 1990	Auburn Hills	United States	The Palace of Auburn Hills
27 June 1990	Burgettstown	United States	Coca-Cola Star Lake Amphitheater
30 June 1990	St. John's	Canada	Memorial Stadium
2 July 1990	Moncton	Canada	Moncton Coliseum
4 July 1990	Toronto	Canada	Canadian National Exhibition Stadium
6 July 1990	Ottawa	Canada	Ottawa Civic Centre
7 July 1990	Saratoga Springs	United States	Saratoga Performing Arts Center
9 July 1990	Philadelphia	United States	The Spectrum
10 July 1990	Philadelphia	United States	The Spectrum
12 July 1990	Philadelphia	United States	The Spectrum
13 July 1990	Philadelphia	United States	The Spectrum
16 July 1990	Uniondale	United States	Nassau Veterans Memorial Coliseum
18 July 1990	Columbia	United States	Merriweather Post Pavilion
19 July 1990	Columbia	United States	Merriweather Post Pavilion
21 July 1990	Foxborough	United States	Sullivan Stadium
23 July 1990	Hartford	United States	Hartford Civic Center
25 July 1990	Niagara Falls	United States	Niagara Falls Convention and Civic Center
29 July 1990	East Rutherford	United States	Giants Stadium
Europe
4 August 1990	Milton Keynes	England	Milton Keynes Bowl
5 August 1990	Milton Keynes	England	Milton Keynes Bowl
7 August 1990	Manchester	England	Maine Road
9 August 1990	Dublin	Ireland	Point Depot
10 August 1990	Dublin	Ireland	Point Depot
13 August 1990	Fréjus	France	Arènes de Fréjus
16 August 1990	Ghent	Belgium	Flanders Expo
18 August 1990	Nijmegen	Netherlands	Stadion de Goffert
19 August 1990	Maastricht	Netherlands	Maastricht Exhibition & Congress Centre
22 August 1990	Oslo	Norway	Jordal Stadion
24 August 1990	Stockholm	Sweden	Olympiastadion
25 August 1990	Copenhagen	Denmark	Idraetsparken
26 August 1990	Copenhagen	Denmark	Idraetsparken
29 August 1990	Linz	Austria	Linzer Stadion
31 August 1990	East Berlin	East Germany	Weißensee Sportplatz
1 September 1990	Schüttorf	West Germany	Festival Site
2 September 1990	Ulm	West Germany	Open Air Festival
4 September 1990	Budapest	Hungary	MTK Stadium
5 September 1990	Zagreb	Yugoslavia	Stadion Maksimir
8 September 1990	Modena	Italy	Festa de l'Unità
11 September 1990	Gijón	Spain	Hipódromo de las Mestas
12 September 1990	Madrid	Spain	Rockodromo Arena
14 September 1990	Lisbon	Portugal	Alvalade Stadium
16 September 1990	Barcelona	Spain	Estadio Olímpico de Montjuic
South America
20 September 1990	Rio de Janeiro	Brazil	Apoteose Square Hall
22 September 1990	São Paulo	Brazil	Estádio Palestra Itália
23 September 1990	São Paulo	Brazil	Estádio Palestra Itália
25 September 1990	São Paulo	Brazil	Olímpia Theatre
27 September 1990	Santiago	Chile	Rock in Chile Festival - Estadio Nacional de Chile
29 September 1990	Buenos Aires	Argentina	River Plate Stadium

== Songs ==
From David Bowie

- "Space Oddity"

From Hunky Dory

- "Changes"
- "Life on Mars?"
- "Queen Bitch"

From The Rise and Fall of Ziggy Stardust and the Spiders from Mars

- "Starman"
- "Ziggy Stardust"
- "Suffragette City"
- "Rock 'n' Roll Suicide"

From Aladdin Sane

- "Panic in Detroit"
- "The Jean Genie"

From Live Santa Monica '72

- "I'm Waiting for the Man" (from The Velvet Underground & Nico (1967) by The Velvet Underground and Nico; written by Lou Reed; outtake from 1966 to 1972 sessions)

From Ziggy Stardust: The Motion Picture

- "White Light/White Heat" (originally from White Light/White Heat (1968) by The Velvet Underground; written by Lou Reed)

From Diamond Dogs

- "Rebel Rebel"

From Young Americans

- "Young Americans"
- "Fame" (Bowie, John Lennon, Carlos Alomar)

From Station to Station

- "Station to Station"
- "Golden Years"
- "TVC 15"
- "Stay"

From Low

- "Sound and Vision"
- "Be My Wife"

From "Heroes"

- "'Heroes'" (Bowie, Brian Eno)

From Scary Monsters (and Super Creeps)

- "Ashes to Ashes"
- "Fashion"

From Let's Dance

- "Modern Love"
- "China Girl" (originally from The Idiot (1977) by Iggy Pop; written by Pop and Bowie)
- "Let's Dance"

From Tonight

- "Blue Jean"

Other songs:

- "A Hard Rain's A-Gonna Fall" (from The Freewheelin' Bob Dylan (1963) by Bob Dylan; written by Dylan)
- "Alabama Song" (originally from Bertolt Brecht's opera Rise and Fall of the City of Mahagonny; written by Brecht and Kurt Weill; released a non-album single (1980))
- "Amsterdam" (originally from Olympia 1964 by Jacques Brel, written by Brel & Mort Shuman; B-side of the "Sorrow" single (1973))
- "Baby, Please Don't Go" (originally a single (1935) by Big Joe Williams)
- "Baby What You Want Me to Do" (originally a single (1959) by Jimmy Reed; famously covered by Elvis Presley (1968))
- "Fame '90 (House mix)" (new version of said song from Young Americans (originally from 1975); released as a single in 1990)
- "Heartbreak Hotel" (originally a single (1956) by Elvis Presley, written by Presley, Mae Boren Axton and Thomas Durden)
- "'Helden'" (German language version of the song from "Heroes"; appears on some versions of the "'Heroes'" single)
- "John, I'm Only Dancing" (released as a non-album single in 1972 with a sax version released the following year; written by Bowie)
- "Pretty Pink Rose" (from Young Lions (1990) by Adrian Belew; written by Bowie)
- "You and I and George" (traditional)
- "Gloria" (originally by Them, it was first released as a B-side to the "Baby, Please Don't Go" single (1964) and later found on The Angry Young Them (1965); written by Van Morrison)
