= Carrie Ann Inaba =

American television dancer, choreographer, actress, and singer (born 1968)

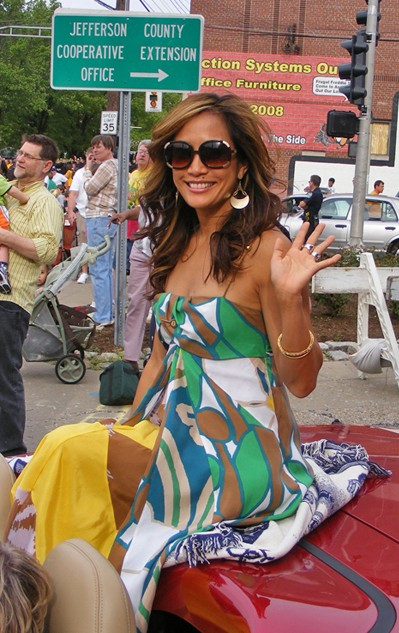
- Carrie Ann Inaba at the 2008 Kentucky Derby Festival
- Born: January 5, 1968 (age 58); Honolulu, Hawaii, U.S.
- Education: Punahou School; University of California, Los Angeles
- Occupations: Television judge, talk/game show host, dancer, choreographer, actress, singer
- Years active: 1986–present
- Height: 5 ft 6 in (168 cm)
- Partner(s): Artem Chigvintsev (2006–2008); Jesse Sloan (2009–2012); Robb Derringer (2016–2017)

Carrie Ann Inaba (born January 5, 1968) is an American television personality, dancer, choreographer, actress, and singer. She is best known for her work on ABC's Dancing with the Stars for which she has served as a judge since 2005. She co-hosted and moderated the CBS Daytime talk show The Talk from 2019 to 2021. She started her career as a singer in Japan, but became best known for her dancing, introducing herself to American audiences as one of the original Fly Girls on the Fox sketch comedy series In Living Color from 1990 to 1992.

== Early life ==
Inaba was born and raised in Honolulu, Hawaii, graduating from Punahou School in 1986. She is of Irish, Japanese, and Chinese descent. Her first dance instruction was at three years old in a "creative movement" class, where children danced on their own with scarves. As a child, she would dance in her backyard that overlooked the Pacific Ocean.

She attended Sophia University and University of California, Irvine before graduating from the University of California, Los Angeles with a B.A. degree in world arts and cultures.

== Career ==
=== Singing ===
In 1986, an 18-year-old Inaba won a talent show in Hawaii. She was then groomed to be a pop star in Japan and given songs to read phonetically in Japanese from a lyric sheet. Even though her first single made the Top 50, she "realized it has nothing to do with how artistic you are. Your face becomes a logo they sell." Inaba lived in Tokyo from 1986 to 1988 and was a popular singer. She released three singles, "Party Girl" (backed with "China Blue"), "Be Your Girl" (backed with "6½ Capezio"), and "Yume no Senaka" (backed with "Searching") and hosted weekly radio and television series.

=== Dancing ===
Five multicultural girls were going for their dreams and not afraid. I felt so at home.

— Inaba, to People magazine, on her experience as a Fly Girl on In Living Color

After returning to America, Inaba appeared as one of the "Fly Girls"—a group of dancers on the television series In Living Color—from 1990 to 1992. She also performed with Canadian singer Norman Iceberg and dancers Viktor Manoel (David Bowie's "Glass Spider" tour) and Luca Tommassini at Prince's notorious Glam Slam. Inaba appeared as a featured solo dancer during Madonna's 1993 Girlie Show World Tour, on the condition she shave her hair. After hesitating, she decided it was worth it. Her favorite dance is rumba since, according to American Fitness, she feels it is "very strong and demanding".

=== Film and television appearances ===
Inaba appeared as one of the background dancers in the film adaptation of Monster Mash in 1995. She appeared in the film Austin Powers in Goldmember (2002) as Fook Yu, alongside Diane Mizota, who played her twin sister Fook Mi. The two women are not related, but when Mizota had been cast for her role, she was asked if she knew any actresses who resembled her and suggested Inaba. Inaba, who had appeared briefly in Austin Powers: The Spy Who Shagged Me, was given the role and the two women were made up to appear as identical twins. Inaba and Mizota reprised their roles with Mike Myers in a commercial for Motorola in 2005. In later years, Inaba would later regret playing Fook Yu because of the negative stereotypes portrayed.

Inaba has acted (usually as a dancer) in the movies Monster Mash: The Movie, Lord of Illusions, Showgirls, Boys and Girls, Flintstones II, Freak and American Virgin and the television series Jack & Jill and Nikki.

Inaba has appeared on The View, the ABC talent competition Dance War: Bruno vs. Carrie Ann, and the Fox special Breaking the Magician's Code: Magic's Biggest Secrets Finally Revealed. She, along with Bruno Tonioli, has appeared in every season on Dancing with the Stars.

Inaba guest starred as Tina, Hannah's choreographer, in the Hannah Montana episode, "Papa's Got a Brand New Friend".

TV Guide Network announced that it had signed Inaba to anchor its live red carpet coverage, beginning with the 2009 Primetime Emmy Awards.

In October 2010, Inaba was named host of the revival of the game show 1 vs. 100 on GSN. After the first season, Inaba announced she would not return to host the show.

Inaba had been a recurring guest co-host for the CBS Daytime talk show, The Talk, for the last two seasons. She officially replaced original host Julie Chen as the fifth co-host and moderator permanently, officially debuting on January 2, 2019. On April 26, 2021, Inaba announced she would take a leave of absence from the show. On August 20, 2021, it was confirmed that Inaba would not be returning to the show for the upcoming season.

=== Choreography ===
Inaba's choreography has appeared in several television series, including American Idol, American Juniors, All American Girl, He's a Lady, In Search of the Partridge Family (in which she also appeared on air), Married by America, The Sexiest Bachelor in America Pageant, The Swan, and Who Wants to Marry a Multi-Millionaire?. She also choreographed the Miss America Pageant for five years. She appeared in the first season of So You Think You Can Dance during the audition stages where she provided choreography for the "choreography round".

Inaba served as an honorary judge at the 2009 USA Dance National Dance Sport Championships.

=== Film production ===
Inaba is the founder and President of EnterMediArts, Inc., a video production company. She directs, writes, and edits films. Her work includes E! Behind The Scenes Miss America Special, 7th Festival of the Pacific Arts, A Portrait of IVI and Beyond the Dancing Image, along with the short feature film Black Water.

=== Theater ===
She was a producer for the Broadway show Burn the Floor at New York's Longacre Theatre.

In 2008, Inaba was awarded the Visionary Award by East West Players, the oldest Asian Pacific American theatre company in the United States, for helping to raise "the visibility of the Asian American community through theater, film and television".

== Personal life ==
In 2006, she dated Russian dancer Artem Chigvintsev. They met on the set of So You Think You Can Dance.

On the March 31, 2011, episode of Live with Regis and Kelly, Regis Philbin was "answering" a letter asking for advice on how to propose. The lights dimmed just before Inaba's boyfriend, Jesse Sloan, appeared on stage. With violinists playing in the background, Sloan, bent on one knee, asked for Inaba's hand, to which she responded "Yes! I will marry you!" Inaba and Jesse met on online dating site eHarmony in 2009. In an interview with Us Weekly in 2011, Inaba stated that she and Sloan would marry in the summer of that year. In September 2012, a representative for Dancing with the Stars announced that Inaba and Sloan had amicably ended their engagement.

In December 2016, Inaba announced that she and actor Robb Derringer had become engaged after a few months of dating. Derringer proposed on a romantic, secluded beach on the California coastline, which was the site of their first date. In September 2017, they called off the engagement.

Inaba has expressed a great love and respect for animals, supporting organizations such as the Humane Society of the United States and PETA, and launching the Carrie Ann Animal Foundation in 2012. In 2012, Inaba started a new YouTube series about shelter cats, motivated by her love of the creatures. She has had as many as seven rescue animals as pets at the same time.

=== Health ===
In a 2011 interview with Prevention, Inaba stated she has a vision of 20/750; which is corrected with eyeglasses and contact lenses. She won't have LASIK eye surgery, however, as her vision impairment gives her, in her words, a "soft-focus morning" until she's ready to "deal with the world". She also said that she has spinal stenosis, which she thinks began with a neck injury during gymnastics when she was eight years old.

She also has Sjögren syndrome, a chronic autoimmune inflammatory disease that destroys moisture-producing glands. As the Sjögren Syndrome Foundation's National Awareness Ambassador and Spokesperson, she has expressed her commitment to increasing awareness of SS and promoting funding for research, treatment, and a cure.

On September 17, 2019, Inaba stated that she had been recently diagnosed with Lupus.

She also has chronic fatigue syndrome, chronic pain, and fibromyalgia. In 2019 while on The Talk, Inaba also opened up about struggling with Tourette Syndrome as a child.

On December 10, 2020, it was reported that she tested positive for COVID-19, but later recovered.

In March 2023, Inaba posted on Instagram that she was diagnosed with acute gangrenous appendicitis and was required to undergo an emergency appendectomy.

=== Philanthropy ===
Inaba has worked with the Entertainment Industry Foundation's iParticipate campaign, an American volunteer advocacy group, and Drea's Dream, a dance therapy initiative for children who have cancer. She's also a founding member of Nigel Lythgoe's dance education organization, the Dizzy Feet Foundation. After her mother's battle with cancer in 2008, both women began to participate in the EIF Revlon Run/Walk for Women.

== Reception ==
Prevention magazine called her judging style "warm, cheerful, and empathetic".

== Filmography ==
=== Film ===
Year	Film	Role	Notes
1993	Rhythm & Jam	Dancer	TV movie
1995	Lord of Illusions	Dancer	
1995	Showgirls	Goddess Dancer	
1995	Monster Mash: The Movie	Singer/Dancer #2	Direct to-VHS
1999	Austin Powers: The Spy Who Shagged Me	Felicity's Dancer #1	
1999	American Virgin	Hiromi	Direct to-DVD
2000	Boys and Girls	Dancer	
2002	Austin Powers in Goldmember	Fook Yu	

=== Television ===
Year	Film	Role	Notes
1990–1992	In Living Color	Fly Girl	68 episodes
1999	Jack & Jill	Dancer	Episode: Fear and Loathing in Gotham
2000–2001	Nikki	Dancer	4 episodes
2005–present	Dancing with the Stars	Judge	
2009	Hannah Montana	Tina	Episode: Papa's Got a Brand New Friend
2010–2011	1 vs. 100	Host	
2017–2021	The Talk	Herself (co-host)	co-host; 47 episodes (guest co-host)

== Footnotes ==
=== Notes ===
a: The American Foundation for the Blind defines legal blindness as vision worse than 20/200 with the best possible correction (even with corrective lenses).

=== References ===
Media offices
Preceded by Bob Saget	Host of 1 vs. 100; 2010–2011	Succeeded by Incumbent
Preceded by Julie Chen Moonves	The Talk co-host 2019–2021	Succeeded by Natalie Morales
