= Person(a) =

Studio album by Norman Iceberg
- Released: 25 June 1987
- Recorded: Marko Studios, Montreal
- Genre: New wave, electronic, synthpop, dance-pop
- Length: 32:24
- Label: TGO/BMG
- Producer: Martin H. Klein

Person(a) is a full-length studio album by Norman Iceberg. Recorded and mixed at Marko Studios in Montreal, it was released in 1987. The musical style of the album is a blend of experimental electronic music and commercial synthpop, and featured keyboardists such as Lenny Pinkas (Men Without Hats), Mario Spezza (Rational Youth) and Mic Lussier. The lyrics contain references to androgyny.

Two singles were released from the album. Initially released on LP and cassette, Person(a) was never re-released on CD, making it now a rare collector's item.

== Track listing ==
1. "Gotta Move" (N. Iceberg, M.H. Klein) – 5:48
2. "Crawl" (N. Iceberg) – 4:41
3. "Be My Human Tonight" (N. Iceberg, M.H. Klein, D. Edmead) – 5:28
4. "(Dont Be So) Cold" (N. Iceberg, M. Spezza) – 5:03
5. "All My Life" (N. Iceberg, L. Tremblay) – 5:30
6. "His Own Story" (N. Iceberg, A. Fecteau) – 5:00
7. "I Am : I Can" (N. Iceberg) – 0:54

== Personnel ==
- Norman Iceberg – Lead and Back Vocals, Synthesizers
- Martin H. Klein – Synthesizers, Drum Programming and Piano
- Dave Edmead – Synthesizers, Drum Programming and Sequencer Programming
- Roberto Coriandoli – Synthesizers
- Lenny Pinkas – Emulator Programming
- Alain Simard – Emulator Programming
- Denis Samson - Sequencer Programming on “Be My Human Tonight”
- Mario Spezza assisted by Michel Lussier – Moog Programming
- François Lalonde – Drum Programming and Percussion
- John Rudel – Percussion on "His Own Story"
- Joe Jammer – Electric Guitar on “Be My Human Tonight”

== Singles ==
1. "Be My Human Tonight"
2. "Gotta Move"
