= Paul Apted =

English sound editor (1967–2014)

- Born: 9 February 1967; Manchester, England
- Died: 4 July 2014 (aged 47); Los Angeles, California, U.S.
- Occupation: Sound editor
- Years active: 1994–2014
- Spouse: Gemma Richardson
- Children: 2
- Father: Michael Apted

Paul Apted (9 February 1967 – 4 July 2014) was an English sound editor who worked on films such as Alice in Wonderland (2010), A Good Day to Die Hard (2013), The Wolverine (2013), The Book Thief (2013) and The Fault in Our Stars (2014).

== Biography ==
Paul Apted was born on 9 February 1967 in Manchester, the son of director Michael Apted and his first wife Jo. He collaborated with his father on the films Nell (1994), Extreme Measures (1996) and The Chronicles of Narnia: The Voyage of the Dawn Treader (2010).

Apted died in Los Angeles on 4 July 2014 from colon cancer, aged 47. He was married to Gemma Richardson; they had two children.
