= Michael Apted =

English filmmaker (1941–2021)

Michael Apted CMG
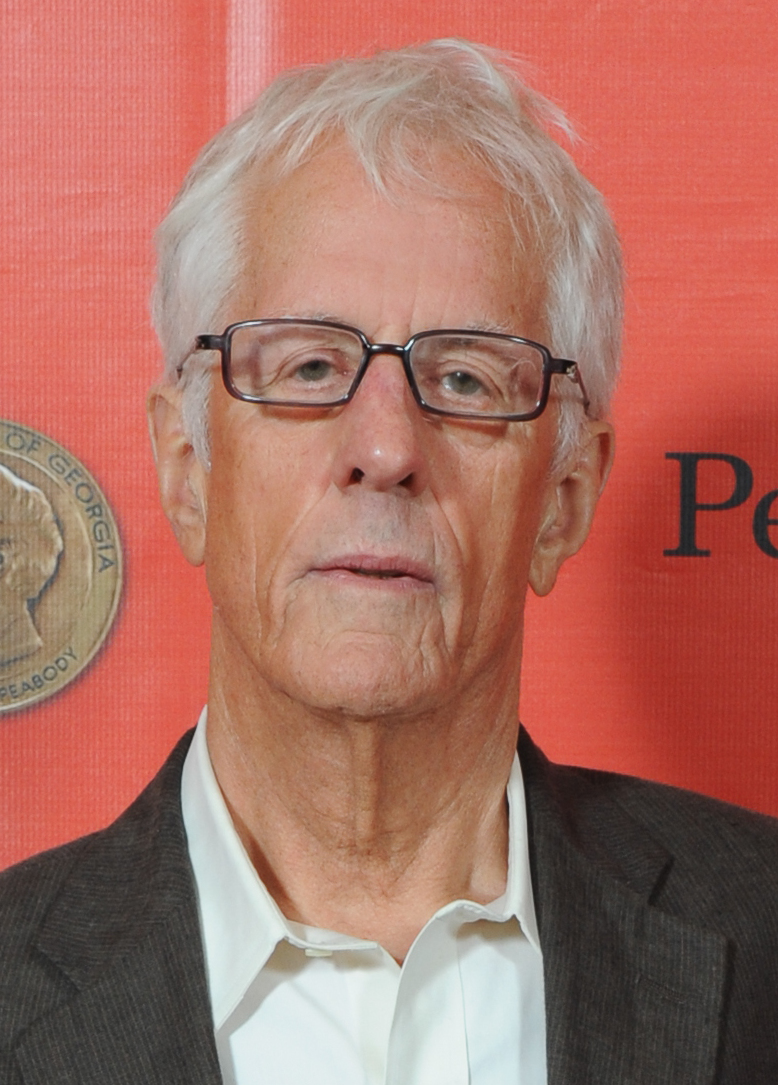
- Apted in 2013
- Born: Michael David Apted; 10 February 1941; Aylesbury, Buckinghamshire, England
- Died: 7 January 2021 (aged 79); Los Angeles, California, U.S.
- Education: City of London School; Downing College, Cambridge
- Occupations: Television and film director, producer
- Years active: 1963–2019
- Spouses: Jo Proctor (m. 1963, divorced) Dana Stevens (m. 1998; div. 2009) Paige Simpson (m. 2014)
- Children: 4, including Paul

Michael David Apted (10 February 1941 – 7 January 2021) was an English television and film director and producer.

Apted began working in television and directed the Up documentary series from 1970 to 2019. He later directed Coal Miner's Daughter (1980), which was nominated for seven Academy Awards including Best Picture. His subsequent work included Gorillas in the Mist (1988), Nell (1994), the James Bond film The World Is Not Enough (1999), and Enigma (2001). His film Amazing Grace (2006) premiered at the closing of the Toronto International Film Festival that year.

On 29 June 2003, Apted was elected president of the Directors Guild of America, a position he served until 2009. He was appointed Companion of the Order of St Michael and St George (CMG) in the 2008 Birthday Honours.

== Early years and education ==
Apted was born on 10 February 1941 at Royal Buckinghamshire Hospital in Aylesbury, the son of Frances Amelia (née Thomas) and Ronald William Apted. He was educated at City of London School and Downing College, Cambridge, where he studied law and history.

== Career ==
=== Television ===
Apted began his career in television as a trainee for six months at Granada Television in Manchester, where he worked as a researcher. One of his first projects at Granada would become his best known: the Up series, which began in 1964 as a profile of 14 seven-year-old children for the current affairs series World in Action. As a researcher and assistant to Canadian director Paul Almond, Apted was involved in selecting the children, who came from a variety of backgrounds and classes. Though originally conceived as a one-off documentary, the series has become an institution.

When it was suggested that they revisit the subjects at ages 14 and 21, Apted accepted the offer to direct and directed every subsequent episode in the series until 63 Up. It explores Apted's thesis that the British class system remains largely in place. It studies the participants based on the Jesuit motto "Give me a child until he is seven and I will show you the man", looking at how they develop during their lives, compared to when they were seven. The series looks at the lives of these people over the years. It won a Peabody Award in 2012 "for its creator’s patience and its subjects' humanity." Apted's last instalment, 63 Up, was produced in 2019. A final series, 70 Up, directed by Asif Kapadia, was broadcast in September 2026.

During his seven-year period of working at Granada, Apted also directed a number of episodes of Coronation Street, then written by Jack Rosenthal, among others. Apted and Rosenthal later collaborated on a number of popular television and film projects, including the pilot episodes for The Dustbinmen and The Lovers. They worked together again in 1982 for the TV movie P'tang, Yang, Kipperbang, the first film commissioned by Britain's Channel 4. In 1976 Apted directed a play in the Granada TV series Laurence Olivier Presents. The episode was The Collection by Harold Pinter. The play starred Laurence Olivier, Malcolm McDowell, Alan Bates and Helen Mirren.

Apted used his idea from the Up series a second time in Married in America and Married in America 2. The idea was to interview nine married couples every two years over a 10-year period to tell a more complete story of their marriages. In 2005, he directed the first three episodes of the TV series Rome.

For his work in television, Apted won several British Academy Awards, including two Flaherty Documentary Awards for his work on 28 Up and 35 Up and a BAFTA for Best Dramatic Director for the single play Kisses at Fifty in 1974.

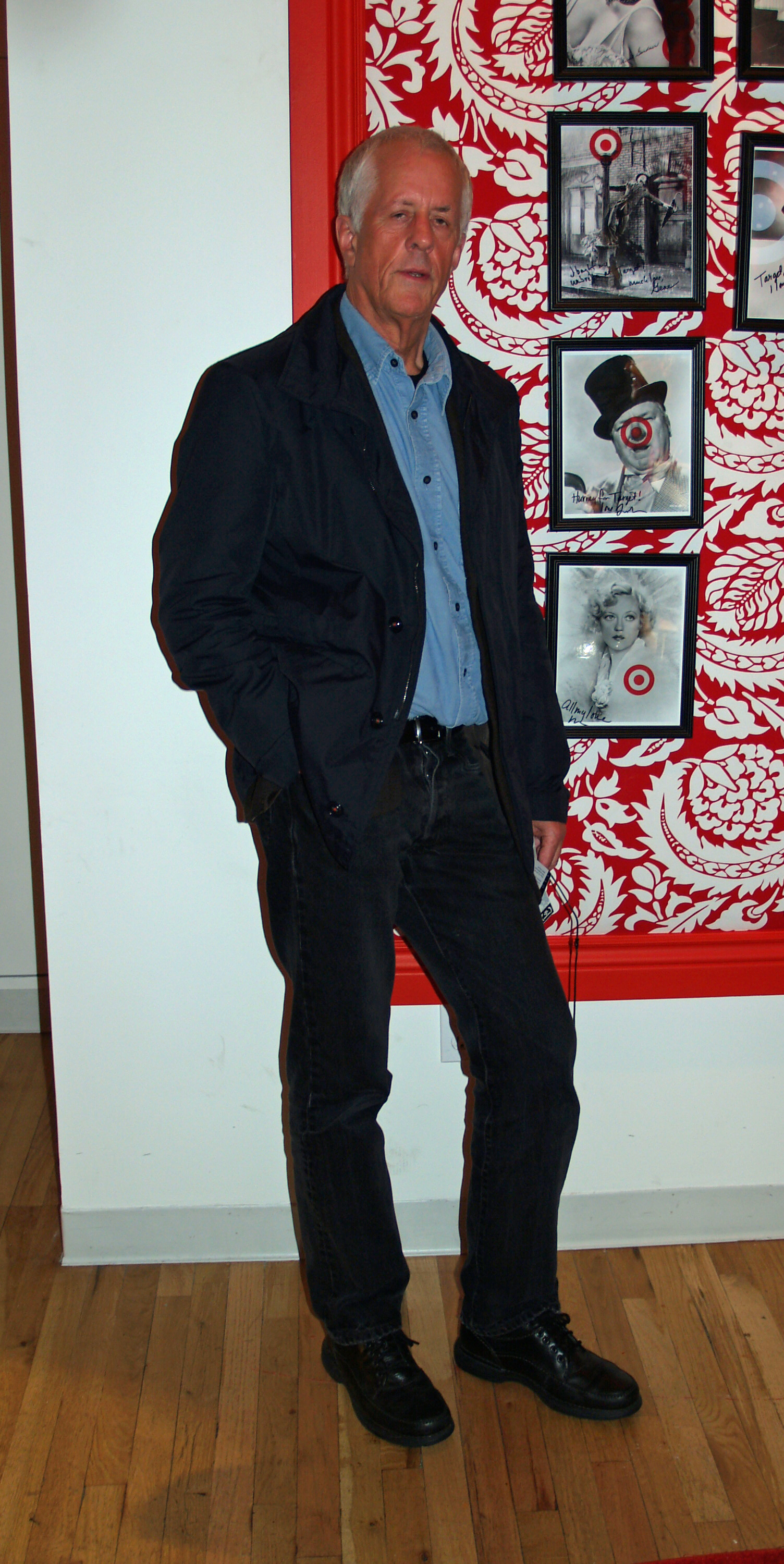
Apted in 2007

=== Film ===
Apted made his first feature film in 1972, The Triple Echo, starring Oliver Reed and Glenda Jackson, and he directed two films for David Puttnam. The Triple Echo was entered into the 8th Moscow International Film Festival. He alternated this work with working on the TV series Play for Today. He directed six plays including Stronger than the Sun, written by Stephen Poliakoff and starring Francesca Annis as a young woman who places her life in danger to expose a crime, a theme Apted returned to several times.

In 1979 he directed the Hollywood-financed Agatha, featuring Vanessa Redgrave. He went to the United States in 1980, where he directed Coal Miner's Daughter, which received seven Academy Award nominations, winning best actress for Sissy Spacek. Both Spacek and Loretta Lynn, the subject of the film, have said that they believe Apted's outsider point of view was crucial to the movie's success in securing the participation of Appalachian residents and to the avoidance of stereotypes that previously had marred portrayals of mountain culture. In 2019, Coal Miner's Daughter was selected by the Library of Congress for preservation in the National Film Registry for being "culturally, historically, or aesthetically significant".

Apted also made several films with a strong social message or that deal with an ethical dilemma. In 1983 he directed Gorky Park, a political thriller based on the novel by Martin Cruz Smith, that deals with police corruption in the former Soviet Union. Class Action deals with a corporate whistleblower, and Extreme Measures is about medical ethics. Class Action was entered into the 17th Moscow International Film Festival.

In 1994, he directed Nell, which received three Golden Globe Award nominations and one Academy Award nomination.

In 1999, Apted directed the James Bond film The World Is Not Enough.

=== Documentary ===
In addition to the Up series, Apted made other documentaries, including Bring On the Night, a feature-length concert film about the making of Sting's first solo album. He directed the documentary The Long Way Home, which was released in 1989. It chronicled the UK, US and USSR adventures of Boris Grebenshchikov, the first Soviet underground musician allowed to record in the West.

Before the making of Thunderheart, Apted made the documentary Incident at Oglala about Leonard Peltier. Incident at Oglala then informed Thunderheart in the casting of actors for the fiction film.

In 1997, he explored the creative process in Inspirations through candid discussion with seven artists from diverse media, including David Bowie, Louise Lecavalier and Roy Lichtenstein among others.

In a departure from his earlier work, from 1992 to 1994, Apted ventured into China's rapidly changing popular culture. In a project backed by Trudie Styler, Apted directed Moving the Mountain, a feature documentary which probed the origins of the 1989 protests in Tiananmen Square and the consequences of the movement in the lives of several of the movement's student leaders.

In 2006, Apted co-directed The Official Film of the 2006 FIFA World Cup, narrated by Pierce Brosnan.

Apted was the collaborator and subject of the documentary Michael Apted – Visions on Film, by artist and filmmaker Melinda Camber Porter.

=== Theatre ===
In 1977, Apted directed the premiere of Strawberry Fields at the National Theatre in London.

=== Other activities ===
He served as president of the Directors Guild of America from 2003 to 2009 and served as the secretary-treasurer from 2011 to his death.

== Personal life and death ==
Apted's first marriage was to Jo Proctor in 1966, with whom he had two sons, including sound editor Paul Apted. After that marriage ended in divorce, he married screenwriter Dana Stevens in 1998; they divorced in 2009. They had a son. In 2007 Apted became a father for the fourth time, to a girl, who lives with her mother, Tania Mellis. Apted married Paige Simpson, his third wife, in January 2014.

Apted's health started to decline shortly after the completion of 63 Up, and he died at his home in Los Angeles on 7 January 2021, at the age of 79. In 70 Up, series producer Claire Lewis revealed that Apted had been suffering from early-onset dementia at the time of making 63 Up, which was aggravated by a subsequent fall.

== Filmography ==
=== Film ===
- The Triple Echo (1972)
- Stardust (1974)
- Trick or Treat (1975) (unfinished)
- The Squeeze (1977)
- Agatha (1979)
- Coal Miner's Daughter (1980)
- Continental Divide (1981)
- Gorky Park (1983)
- Firstborn (1984)
- Critical Condition (1987)
- Gorillas in the Mist (1988)
- Class Action (1991)
- Thunderheart (1992)
- Blink (1993)
- Nell (1994)
- Extreme Measures (1996)
- The World Is Not Enough (1999)
- Enigma (2001)
- Enough (2002)
- Amazing Grace (2006)
- The Chronicles of Narnia: The Voyage of the Dawn Treader (2010)
- Chasing Mavericks (2012)
- Unlocked (2017)

Documentary film

Year	Title	Director	Producer	Writer
1970	7 Plus Seven	Yes	Yes	No
1977	21 Up	Yes	Yes	No
1984	28 Up	Yes	Yes	No
1985	Bring On the Night	Yes	No	Yes
1991	35 Up	Yes	Yes	No
1992	Incident at Oglala	Yes	No	No
1994	Moving the Mountain	Yes	No	Yes
1997	Inspirations	Yes	Yes	No
1998	42 Up	Yes	Yes	No
1999	Me & Isaac Newton	Yes	No	No
2005	49 Up	Yes	Yes	No
2007	The Power of the Game	Yes	No	No
2012	56 Up	Yes	Yes	No
2014	Bending the Light	Yes	Executive	No
2019	63 Up	Yes	Yes	No

=== Television ===
Year	Title	Director	Producer	Notes	Ref.
1966–1967	Coronation Street	Yes	No	21 episodes	
1967	Escape	Yes	No	Episode "A Bad Risk"	
1967	Haunted	Yes	No		
1967–1968	City '68	Yes	No	5 episodes	
1968–1972	Playhouse	Yes	No	11 episodes	
1969	Big Breadwinner Hog	Yes	No	2 episodes	
1969	Parkin's Patch	Yes	No	8 episodes	
1970	The Sinners	Yes	No	Episode "Mother Matilda's Book"	
1970	The Lovers	Yes	No	6 episodes	
1971–1972	ITV Saturday Night Theatre	Yes	No	Episodes "Another Sunday and Sweet F.A." and "Big Soft Nellie"	
1971–1972	Follyfoot	Yes	No	2 episodes	
1972	Thirty-Minute Theatre	Yes	No	Episode "Said the Preacher"	
1972–1976	Play for Today	Yes	No	6 episodes	
1973	Black and Blue	Yes	No	Segment High Kampf	
1975	Shades of Greene	Yes	No	Episode "The Destructors"	
1976	Great Performances	Yes	No	Episode "The Collection"	
1976	Plays for Britain	Yes	No	Episode "Paradise Run"	
1982–1985	First Love	Yes	No		
1991	My Life and Times	Yes	No	2 episodes	
1992–1993	Crossroads	Yes	Executive		
1995	New York News	Yes	No	Episode "Pilot"	
2005	Blind Justice	Yes	No	Episode "Leap of Faith"	
2005	Rome	Yes	Consulting	3 episodes (Including "The Stolen Eagle")	
2006	What About Brian	Yes	No	Episode "What About the Fish...?"	
2013–2016	Ray Donovan	Yes	No	2 episodes	
2013–2016	Masters of Sex	Yes	Yes	9 episodes	
2014	Reckless	Yes	No	Episode "Bloodstone"	
2017	Bloodline	Yes	No	"Part 30"	

TV movies

- Joy (1972)
- Haunted: Poor Girl (1974)
- P'tang, Yang, Kipperbang (1982)
- Always Outnumbered (1998)
- Nathan Dixon (1999)
- Hallelujah (2011)

Documentary film

- The Long Way Home (1989)
- Married in America (2003)
- Married in America 2 (2006)

Up series
Year	Title	Director	Producer
1970	7 Plus Seven	Yes	Yes
1977	21 Up	Yes	Yes
1984	28 Up	Yes	Yes
1991	35 Up	Yes	Yes
1991	Age 7 in America	No	Executive
1998	14 Up in America	No	Executive
1998	42 Up	Yes	Yes
2005	49 Up	Yes	Yes
2006	21 Up America	No	Executive
2012	56 Up	Yes	Yes
2019	63 Up	Yes	Yes

== Awards and nominations ==
Year	Title	Academy Awards		BAFTA Awards		Golden Globe Awards	
Year	Title	Nominations	Wins	Nominations	Wins	Nominations	Wins
1974	Stardust			1			
1979	Agatha	1		1		2	
1980	Coal Miner's Daughter	7	1	2		2	2
1983	Gorky Park			1		1	
1988	Gorillas in the Mist	5		1		3	2
1994	Nell	1				3	
Total		14	1	6	0	11	4

== See also ==
- List of British film directors
