= Norman Bedard =

- Norman Bedard during his Norman Iceberg days - Circa 1988

Background information
- Also known as: Norman Iceberg; Norman Joseph
- Born: July 30, 1962 (age 64); Trois-Rivières, Quebec, Canada
- Genres: New wave, pop rock, synthpop, dance
- Occupation: Singer-songwriter
- Instruments: Vocals, guitar, keyboards
- Years active: 1983–present
- Labels: TGO, RCA, BMG, Unidisc, Norfolk
- Website: NormanBedard.com

Norman Joseph Bédard (born July 30, 1962), also known by the former stage names Norman Iceberg and Norman Joseph, is a Canadian singer-songwriter.

== Early years: Performing as Norman Iceberg ==
A graphic artist turned performance artist, Norman Bedard emerged from the Montreal underground music scene in the early '80s under the name Norman Iceberg. One of a handful of gender-bending new wave artists to come out following the success of artists like Duran Duran, Boy George and Gary Numan, Bedard was recruited by music producer Tony Green, responsible for France Joli’s 1979 disco hit "Come To Me".

Norman Bedard's experimental, minimal electro sound was therefore remodeled to cater to the dance club scene as evident on his debut, Be My Human Tonight (RCA). Person(a), released in 1987, was a conceptual collection of synthpop songs reflecting a young man's own vision of life, and featuring keyboardists such as Lenny Pinkas (Men Without Hats), Mario Spezza (Rational Youth) and Mic Lussier. The cover photograph of him posing nude - pre-dating Prince’s Lovesexy by several months - stirred up controversy. A few selections taken from Person(a) were used for TVA’s Le Match de la Vie hosted by Quebec author and former politician Claude Charron.

On stage, careful attention was paid to set design and visual effects; Bedard would then sometimes only be backed by a pre-recorded soundtrack and live vocalists such as Claudine Mercier and Louise Litsz, giving them entire freedom to use props and screens, a style made popular by American performance artist Laurie Anderson. 1988 saw the release of Gotta Move.

With its frenetic, energetic beat, 1989’s "Kiss the Beauty" was a favourite for months in night clubs. The title track's music video was directed by filmmaker Érik Canuel. A couple of years later, "We Act" got him a "Best Video" nomination at the Musique Plus (his native Quebec equivalent to MTV) Video Awards.

== Transition: From Norman Iceberg to Norman Bedard ==
Norman Bedard performing with Robert Consoli (right) in 1992.

In the early '90s, American music industry executives strongly advised him to change his name in order to avoid any confusion with new rap artists Ice-T, Ice Cube and Vanilla Ice. However, with a strong gay following, Bedard decided to keep using his stage name, performing notably at the 1992 Los Angeles Gay Pride, the notorious Whisky a Go Go, as well as Prince’s Glam Slam, backed by dancers Viktor Manoel (from David Bowie’s 'Glass Spider' tour), Luca Tommassini and Carrie Ann Inaba (from Madonna’s 'Girlie Show' tour). He also performed acoustic sets with American actor Robert Consoli on guitar.

Ending a series of concerts with a five-piece rock band at The Roxy Theatre in Los Angeles, Bedard’s actual last appearance under the name Norman Iceberg was on the syndicated TV show Sheena Metal's Freakin' Rock Review in 1993. He also recorded as Norman Joseph in 1994 before deciding to go back to using Norman Bedard, his last birth name.

Committed to his craft, Norman Bedard continued writing songs, working with collaborators such as Kevin Komoda (Rational Youth, Sarah McLachlan), and self-produced several pre-prod albums not available commercially, which revealed a more subdued side. Bedard’s newer material, recorded in various studios, offered the sound of a simple and mature man embracing life. With his goal of easing our souls, he termed his new music "zen pop".

In November 2007, Norman announced via his website that a brand new album scheduled for release in 2008 was in the works. The album was confirmed to be titled Vital on March 9, 2009, with a release date set for Spring 2009. Vital, and a remastered version of We Act were both released simultaneously on July 15, 2009. "Wonderful" was the first single from Vital, released on March 2, 2010. Also released on the same date was Norman Iceberg's "Crawl" (Alternate Version), originally recorded in the 1990s at Men Without Hats’ home studio.

On June 1, 2010, Bedard released the second single from his Vital album, "A Day With My Self", described by Richard Morris of Pink Paper as a "folky ditty". It was followed with the release of Norman Iceberg's 1+1=2, also recorded in the 1990s at Men Without Hats’ home studio and newly remastered in 2010. The following single, "Thank You", was released on October 4, 2010. Following this, Bedard gave us "Sleepytime". Adrian Cooke, in a review for Maverick, called "Sleepytime" "a pop-flavoured song", saying "this is a gentle lullaby with sensitive vocal assisted by ethereal harmonies. Quality stuff". Norman's next single "Space" was released on February 8, 2011. Writer Jack Foley of IndieLondon called "Space" a "chilled pop record" and "the sort of offering that has an instant catchy appeal to it".
