= Édouard Lock =

Canadian choreographer

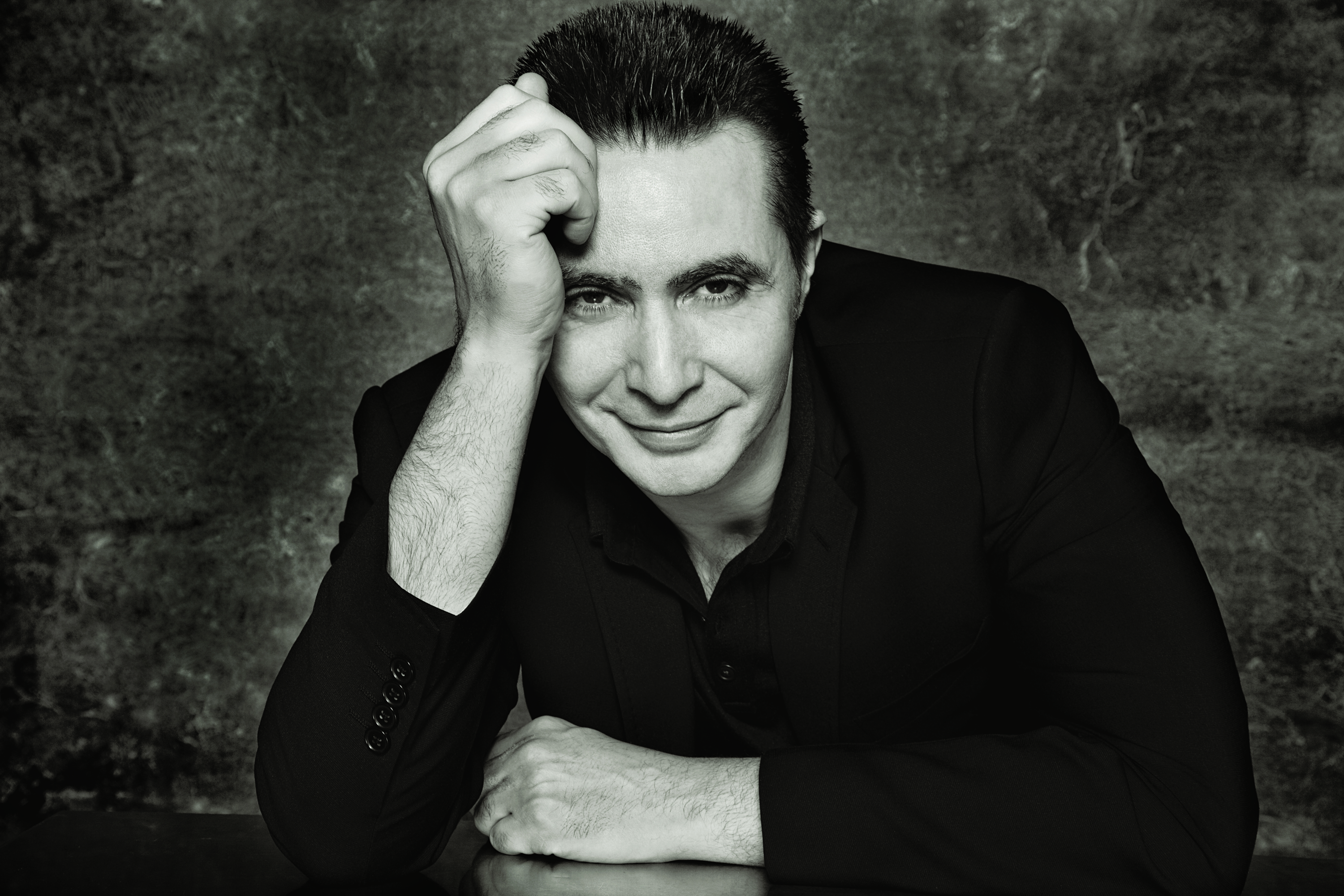
Edouard Lock

Édouard Lock (born March 3, 1954, in Morocco) is a Canadian dance choreographer and the founder of the Canadian dance group, La La La Human Steps.

== Career ==
La La La Human Steps Founder, Artistic Director and Choreographer Édouard Lock began his choreographic career at the age of 20 and founded La La La Human Steps in 1980. Over the years Mr. Lock has been invited to create works for some of the world's leading dance companies, including the Paris Opera Ballet, the Het Nationale Ballet of Holland, The Nederlands Dans Theater, the Cullberg Ballet and the Royal Ballet of Flanders.

At the invitation of Robert Carson and the Paris Opera, Mr. Lock choreographed "Les Boréades" composed by Rameau and performed by his company LHS at Le Palais Garnier.

== Collaborations ==
Édouard Lock has also worked with several figures in the world of music. He created a choreographed event with David Bowie and Louise Lecavalier as part of the 40th anniversary celebrations of the Institute of Contemporary Arts, filmed by video artist Nam June Paik, then continued his collaboration with Bowie in 1990 as creator and art director of his Sound+Vision Tour. In 1992. he worked with Frank Zappa on the performance of Yellow Shark, alongside the Ensemble Modern, the Frankfurt Alte Oper, the Berlin Philharmonic and the Vienna Konzerthaus. He also commissioned works from and collaborated with Iggy Pop, Einstürzende Neubauten (Blixa Bargeld, Marc Chung, F. M. Einheit), Shellac of North America (Steve Albini), Skinny Puppy, My Bloody Valentine (Kevin Shields) David Van Tiegham, Janitors Animated (Yves Chamberland), West India Company (Stephen Luscombe, Pandit Dinesh). He has also worked with American composer and Pulitzer Award winner David Lang for Salt (1997) and Amelia (2002) and with British composer Gavin Bryars, for 2, Amjad, and New Work.

== Other Activities ==
Various films have been made on Mr. Lock's work including Le Petit Musée de Vélasquez directed by Bernar Hébert, and the documentary Inspirations by British director Michael Apted, which also included Roy Lichtenstein, Tadao Ando and David Bowie amongst others.

== Recognition ==
His works have garnered many awards, including the Chalmers choreographic prize, the New York Dance and Performance Award, the Prix Denise-Pelletier, the National Arts Centre Award, the Benois de la Danse choreographic award given in Moscow, the Governor General's Performing Arts Award, the Premio Positano Leonide Massine Award, The Molson Prize given by the Canada Council for the Arts and an honorary doctorate granted by the Université du Québec.

The film adaptation of Amelia, directed by Edouard Lock, had its American premiere at the 2004 Tribeca Film Festival and its European premiere at the Karlovy Vary International Film Festival. The film won its category at the Chicago International Film Festival, the Prague International Film Festival and the Rose d'Or Festival in Switzerland as well as winning two I.C.E. and two Gemini Awards for best direction and best editing.

Mr. Lock was named a Chevalier de l'Ordre national du Québec and Officer of the Order of Canada

- 1982 : National Jean A. Chalmers Choreography Award (Oranges 1982)
- 1986 : Bessie Award (New-York)
- 2001 : Knight of the National Order of Quebec
- 2001 : Governor General's National Arts Centre Award
- 2001 : National Arts Centre Award
- 2001 : Jean A. Chalmers National Dance Award (Exaucé / Salt)
- 2002 : Prix Denise-Pelletier
- 2003 : Prix Benois de la Danse
- 2004 : Gemini Awards
- 2006 : Fellow of the Royal Society of Canada
- 2010 : Governor General's Performing Arts Award
- 2010 : Molson Prize
- 2010 : Officer of the Order of Canada
- 2010 : Doctor honoris causa, Université du Québec à Montréal
- 2011 : Prix Premio Positano Leonide Massine per la Danza
- 2012 : Prix du CALQ pour la meilleure tournée internationale
- 2015 : Le Grand Prix de la Danse (The Seasons 2015)

== Works ==
- 1976 : Temps volé
- 1977 : La Maison de ma mère
- 1977 : Remous
- 1978 : Le Nageur
- 1980 : Lily Marlène dans la jungle, Western
- 1981 : Oranges ou la Recherche du paradis perdu
- 1983 : Businessman in the Process of Becoming an Angel
- 1985 : Human Sex
- 1987 : New Demons - La belle et la bête
- 1988 : Bread Dances for Het Nationale Ballet
- 1990 : Infante, c'est destroy
- 1995 : 2
- 1996 : Étude for Les Grands Ballets Canadiens
- 1999 : Exaucé/Salt
- 2002 : Amelia, AndréAuria for Opéra national de Paris
- 2003 : Les Boréades for Opéra national de Paris
- 2007 : Amjad
- 2011 : Untitled/New Work/A Piece by Édouard Lock
- 2013 : The Seasons for São Paulo Companhia de Dança
- 2013 : 11th Floor for The Cullberg Ballet
- 2014 : Reprise AndréAuria for Opéra national de Paris
- 2014 : Creation for LA LA LA Human Steps contemporary arts - exhibition at the Boijmans Museum Rotterdam
- 2014 : Directed a film of The Boijmans Museum event
