= Serious Moonlight =

Serious Moonlight may refer to:

- The lyric "under the moonlight, the serious moonlight", from David Bowie's song "Let's Dance"
- Serious Moonlight (1983 film), a video album by David Bowie
- Serious Moonlight (2009 film), a comedy film starring Meg Ryan and Timothy Hutton, Kristen Bell and Justin Long
- Serious Moonlight Tour, a 1983 concert tour by David Bowie
