= Let's Dance (David Bowie song) =

1983 single by David Bowie

Single by David Bowie

from the album Let's Dance
- B-side: "Cat People (Putting Out Fire)"
- Released: 14 March 1983
- Recorded: December 1982
- Studio: Power Station (New York City)
- Genre: Funk; funk rock; new wave; post-disco; dance-pop; dance-rock
- Length: 7:38 (album version); 4:07 (single version)
- Label: EMI America
- Songwriter: David Bowie
- Producers: David Bowie; Nile Rodgers

David Bowie singles chronology
"Peace on Earth/Little Drummer Boy" (1982)	"Let's Dance" (1983)	"China Girl" (1983)

Music video
- "Let's Dance" on YouTube

"Let's Dance" is a song by the English singer-songwriter David Bowie, originally included as the title track of his 1983 album of the same name. Co-produced by Nile Rodgers of Chic, it was recorded in late 1982 at the Power Station in New York City. With the assistance of engineer Bob Clearmountain, Rodgers transformed the song from its folk rock origins to a dance number through studio effects and new musicians Bowie had yet to work with. Bowie hired then-unknown Texas guitarist Stevie Ray Vaughan, who added a blues edge.

Embracing rock, funk, dance, new wave and post-disco, the full-length seven-minute track features numerous solos, including trumpet, saxophone, guitar and percussion. Several music elements, from the bassline and the breakdown, were based on Rodgers' work with Chic, while the rising vocal intros were taken from the Beatles' version of "Twist and Shout". The lyrics describe a couple dancing under the moonlight and possess a sense of peril and ominousness.

Released as the album's lead single in full-length and edited formats, "Let's Dance" became the biggest-selling single of Bowie's career, topping the charts in numerous countries, including the UK and the US. The song's music video, filmed in Australia, provided commentary on the treatment of Aboriginal Australians, using the red shoes from a line to symbolise their abuse. Bowie performed the song throughout the 1980s and early 2000s during his concert tours.

Viewed as one of Bowie's most popular songs, the song has received praise for its catchiness, accessibility, commerciality and production, and has appeared on lists of his best songs. "Let's Dance" has been covered, sampled, remixed and performed by other artists, and has made appearances in films, video games and television commercials.

== Background and development ==
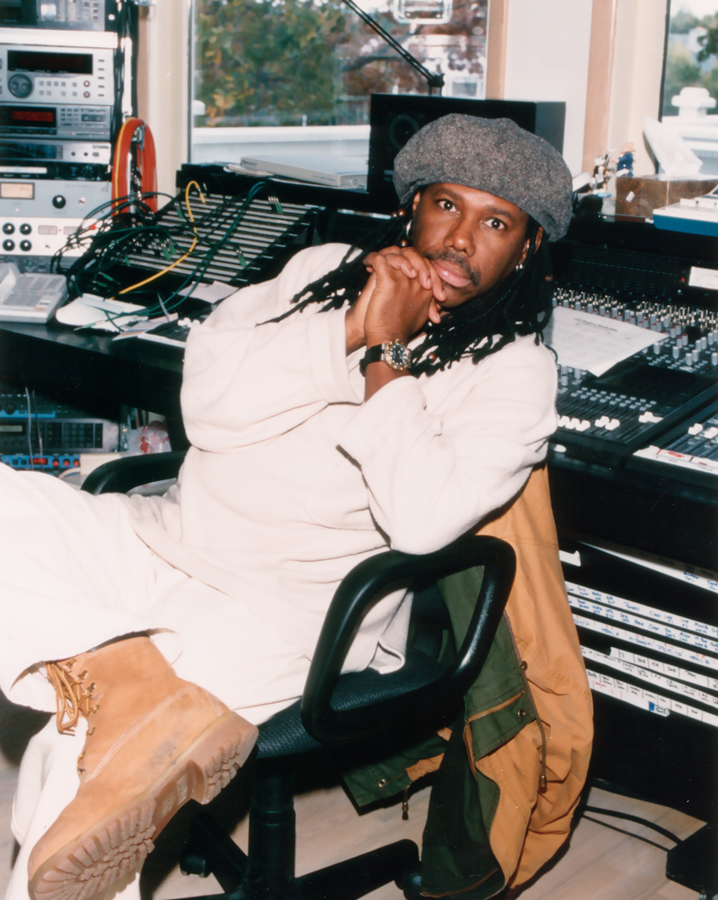
Nile Rodgers (pictured in 1999) was instrumental in the arrangement and production of "Let's Dance".

In 1982, David Bowie left his longtime label RCA Records, having grown increasingly unsatisfied with them, and signed a new contract with EMI for a reported $17 million. With a new label and an idea for a commercial sound, he wanted to start fresh with a new producer. Around autumn, Bowie met Nile Rodgers of the American band Chic in the after-hours New York nightclub Continental, where the two developed a rapport over industry acquaintances and shared musical interests; he eventually asked him to produce his next record. Rodgers initially thought Bowie desired to continue making art rock records—a follow-up to 1980's Scary Monsters—until the artist informed him, "I want you to make hits."

In late 1982, the duo regrouped at Bowie's home in Montreux, Switzerland. Bowie, using a 12-string acoustic guitar that had only six strings, played for him a folk-like number he believed could be a hit with the right arrangement, tentatively calling it "Let's Dance". Dismissing the number as sounding "like Donovan meets Anthony Newley", Rodgers recalled: "I was like, 'that's not happening, man'. It totally threw me. It was not a song you could dance to." Nevertheless, Rodgers adjusted the arrangement, moving it higher in the scale, switching the key up to B♭, inverting the chords and adding upstrokes. (Note: The original's verse and refrains were in B♭ minor, with minor entails to G♭ major, and a bridge in A♭ minor.)

=== Demo ===
Bowie and Rodgers recorded a demo of "Let's Dance" at Montreux's Mountain Studios (Note: Chris O'Leary gives a date of 19 and 20 December 1982, although this conflicts with David Buckley's statement that the album was recorded in the first three weeks of December.) with a group of musicians, among them the Turkish musician Erdal Kızılçay on bass. (Note: Kızılçay became one of Bowie's frequent collaborators during the period.) Kızılçay's work at first followed the stylings of the jazz bassist Jaco Pastorius, but he and Rodgers ultimately worked out a simpler bassline for the song. The biographer Chris O'Leary describes the demo's sound as "basically Bowie singing over a Chic demo". In 2018, Rodgers stated: "This [demo] recording was the first indication of what we could do together as I took his 'folk song' and arranged it into something that the entire world would soon be dancing to and seemingly has not stopped dancing to for the last 35 years! It became the blueprint not only for 'Let's Dance' the song but for the entire album as well." The same year, an edited version of the demo, mixed by Rodgers, was released digitally on 8 January, and the full-length 7:34 demo was released as a 12" vinyl single on 21 April for Record Store Day.

== Recording ==
"Let's Dance" was the first song recorded for the album. The sessions, co-produced by Bowie and Rodgers, took place at the Power Station in New York City during the first three weeks of December 1982. Engineered by Bob Clearmountain, the song was completed in one or two takes and set the tone for the rest of the project. The rest of the album was recorded quickly, completed in just 17 days.

Along with a new producer, Bowie hired an entirely new set of musicians for the sessions, as he "wanted to try people that I'd never worked with before, so that I couldn't predict how they were going to play". Rodgers replaced Bowie's regular Carlos Alomar on rhythm guitar and recruited his Chic collaborators: Robert Sabino (keyboards), Sammy Figueroa (percussion) and Frank and George Simms (backing vocals). Also hired were Omar Hakim (drums), Carmine Rojas (bass), Mac Gollehon (trumpet), David Spinner (vocals) and Stan Harrison, Robert Aaron and Steve Elson (saxophones). Bowie did not play any instruments, stating at the time: "I don't play a damned thing. This was a singer's album!" He recorded his vocals in two days.

Rodgers had the guitar parts treated with delays by Clearmountain and separated into groups of notes, punctuated by the bassline. Blending Rojas' Fender bass with Sabino's bass synthesiser as a way to "expand the dynamic range", Rodgers later said: "David threw in little elements like that and gave it that edge and excitement that I probably wouldn't have thought of." Hakim's snare drum was treated with gated reverb, a sound developed by engineers like Clearmountain and Hugh Padgham at the Power Station and London's Townhouse Studios, respectively, wherein a microphone would be hooked up on the snare head to record the initial impact and rig ambient microphones equipped with noise gates above the kit for extra reverb. Rodgers also added processed rhythm guitar tracks on top of the saxophone and trumpet lines: "It sounds almost unnaturally tight. The attacks come from out of nowhere. There's no pre-attack breathing. The horns just come in, 'pop pop', and then decay out fast." Rojas later stressed the importance of Clearmountain's role in the production: "Bob, as an engineer, really captured what we were doing live in the room. He gets very little credit historically, but take it from me, he was vital to that record."

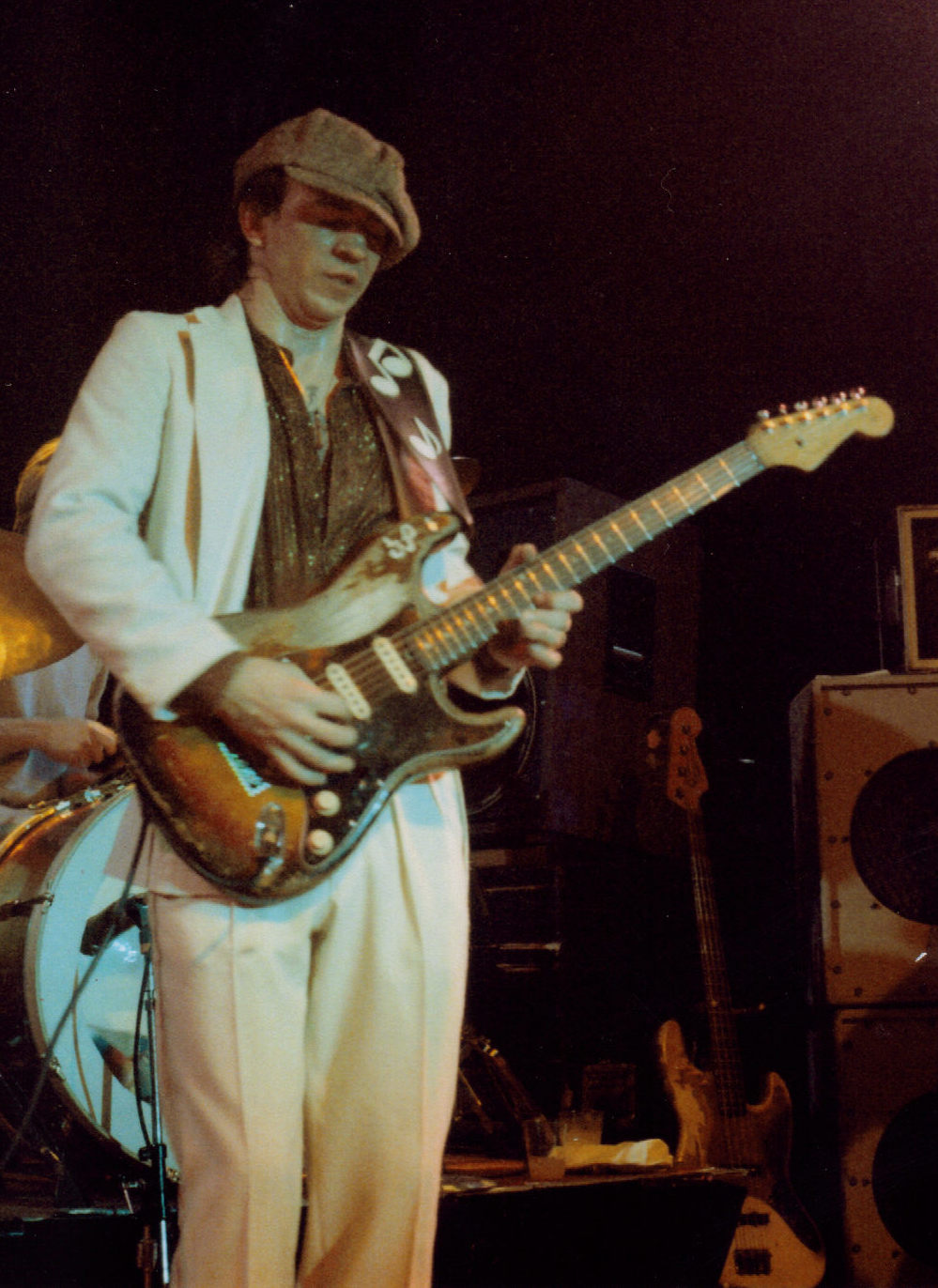
Blues guitarist Stevie Ray Vaughan (pictured in 1983) contributed guitar to the track.

Contributing additional guitar overdubs towards the end of the sessions was Stevie Ray Vaughan, a then-unknown 28-year-old Texas blues guitarist, whom Bowie hired after seeing him play at the 1982 Montreux Jazz Festival. Bowie praised his guitar playing, saying: "He's got a whole other thing going on." He used a Fender Stratocaster plugged into an old Fender amplifier; the author Paul Trynka commented that "all tone [came] from the player". "Let's Dance" was the first song Bowie and Rodgers played for Vaughan. The latter recalled: "[Vaughan] could sense this group of anonymous musicians were about to make history."

== Composition ==
Over seven minutes in length, O'Leary states that "Let's Dance" consists of a series of "set pieces", featuring individual solos by trumpet, guitar, percussion and saxophone. The track's verses and refrains are merged, with the bridge acting "as another refrain". The title comes from Chris Montez's 1962 song of the same name that Bowie had played with his first band the Kon-rads.

=== Music ===
Speaking in 2014, Rodgers explained: "[Bowie] wanted me to make a record that sounded like the future, but still sounded like the essence of rock 'n' roll and R&B, but would be timeless." Bowie, who labelled the song "a postmodern homage to the Isley Brothers' 'Twist and Shout'", cited Rodgers as the reason for its "incredible commercial appeal". Mirroring the popular dance music of the day, the author James E. Perone says the song was aimed at the audience that ignored Bowie's prior musical and lyrical experiments. O'Leary describes the song as "a sampler of American music" and "a catalog in jump-cuts", displaying the likes of electric blues, funk, Hollywood jazz, R&B, rock 'n' roll [and] Latin". Other commentators have categorised the song as funk, new wave, dance-rock, post-disco, dance-pop and funk rock.

The song begins with a rising vocal intro, which Bowie had Rodgers add as a way to hook audiences in immediately. Taken from the Beatles' version of "Twist and Shout" (1963), drums, bass, trumpet, saxophone and vocals converge and explode into a cadence. Similarly styled crescendos occur towards the end of the refrains, where Bowie moves up the scale – "if you should fall... into my arms" – before peaking on "trem-ble-like-a-flowwwww-er!" According to O'Leary, the bridge is a "melodic steal" from the Beatles' "She Loves You" (1963). The song's breakdown mimics Chic, where the instruments strip one by one to bass and drums before building back up again. Rodgers later explained to the biographer David Buckley: "On a song like Chic's 'Good Times' [1979], the most important part was the breakdown. Whenever the band would go to the breakdown the audience would scream." O'Leary compares the dueling saxophone break to the World Saxophone Quartet rather than a contemporary R&B horn section.

Instrumentally, the final bassline, which the biographer Nicholas Pegg considers "pure Chic", features two interspersing hooks of "a four-note stepwise descent and a five-note pattern that falls a step or holds the same note". The drum track utilises an elaborate kick drum pattern that repeats every eight bars, (Note: Duran Duran used the same drum pattern for their 1983 single "Union of the Snake".) while the brass riffs–heard directly after "dance the blues"–were lifted from Henry Mancini's Peter Gunn soundtrack (1959). Rodgers said "that [riff] seemed to me so anti-groove, but sticking it on something that was so hard groove [...] it was magic!" O'Leary compares Figueroa's woodblocks to sounding like "mechanical rattlesnakes" and notes the isolated vocal tracks sound like they were "recorded in a canyon". Vaughan, using Albert King as inspiration, adds a blues-inflected edge to the overall dance groove. Discussing the track at the time, Bowie said: "It's got a hard cut, very high on treble – it sears through."

=== Lyrics ===
It's ostensibly a dance song, but there's a particular type of desperation and poignancy about it.

— David Bowie, 1983

Pegg writes that the song "maintains a gravity absent from the rest of the album by virtue of its surprising bleakness". Containing an enigmatic sense of peril, the narrator invites his partner to dance, portrayed as a type of ceremonial engagement. Rather than dancing under a "lovers' moon", the two dance "under the moonlight"—a "serious moonlight". Although Bowie told an interviewer at the time the phrase was meaningless, Rodgers felt the "serious moonlight" was indebted to him, telling Buckley that he "used to say 'serious' all the time". Pegg finds a possible inspiration to be Aleister Crowley's 1923 composition "Lyric of Love to Leah", which features lines related to dancing in the moonlight with a lover. Perone interprets the use of "serious" as representing a "critical juncture" of the relationship. Additionally, the future is portrayed as empty and the only remedy is to dance "for fear tonight is all". O'Leary deems the lyrics "fragile, regretful and ominous".

The narrator also instructs his lover to "put on your red shoes and dance", which O'Leary likens to the medieval St. Vitus' dance and the 1948 film The Red Shoes. The artist Tanja Stark also argued the phrase recalls Hans Christian Andersen's tale "The Red Shoes", in which a little girl is vainly tempted to wear red shoes only to find they could not be removed, separating her from God's grace: "Let's dance / for fear your grace should fall."

== Release ==
EMI America issued "Let's Dance" as the lead single from the album on 14 March 1983, (Note: Previously, it was thought to be 17, 18, and 21 March) backed by a remake of "Cat People (Putting Out Fire)". (Note: Bowie originally recorded "Cat People" with Giorgio Moroder as the title track for the 1982 film of the same name. Unhappy with the original, the song was remade during the sessions for Let's Dance.) Appearing on 7" and 12" vinyl—catalogue numbers EA 152 and 12EA 152, respectively—the former featured a shortened edit running 4:07, while the latter had the full-length 7:38 album cut; it also received a cassette release two weeks later. O'Leary calls the single edit "pure economy"; Vaughan's first appearance is relegated to a single note. The Brazilian single featured a different edit, which Pegg states was the album version with an early fade. Both sides of the single offered a glimpse into Bowie's change of direction following Scary Monsters. On the album, released on 14 April, "Let's Dance" appeared as the third track on side one of the original LP, sequenced between "China Girl" and "Without You".

"Let's Dance" was the biggest single of Bowie's career and a massive international hit. It entered the UK Singles Chart at number five, securing the top spot from Duran Duran's "Is There Something I Should Know?" two weeks later and remained there for three weeks, enjoying a 14-week chart stay; the song would become his final UK number-one. It was the 4th best-selling single of 1983 in the UK and is one of the 300 best-selling UK singles of all time, with 1,064,227 units sold by 2017. It also attained the number one position on the Billboard (US) Hot 100 and Hot Dance/Disco charts, and number one in Canada, Ireland, Sweden, Switzerland, the Netherlands, New Zealand and Norway, and number two in Australia, Austria and Germany. Becoming the biggest selling single of Bowie's career up to that point, aside from the often-reissued "Space Oddity" (1969), "Let's Dance" relaunched Bowie as a worldwide superstar of the 1980s after years of dwindling commercial fortunes in the late-1970s, and changed the course of his career. Rodgers later commented: "The song was going to be a major hit. And we knew it."

=== Reception ===
"Let's Dance" received positive reviews upon its release. Writing for NME, Charles Shaar Murray appreciated Elson's bass and Vaughan's guitar work, praising Bowie's vocal performance for reaching "new heights". He concluded: "'Let's Dance' is easily this year's biggest single; every time it comes up it creates an instant impression of sheer scale. The sounds are huge, the emotions it contains gigantic. You should catch this beat, but be careful what you catch it with." In the US, Rolling Stone's Ken Tucker hailed the song as "a jittery, bopping single as vital as anything on the radio". The same magazine's Dave Marsh said the song was "as great as the Kool & the Gang riffs it cops". Debra Rae Cohen of The New York Times also commended the song's use of different R&B rhythms to create "a larger-than-life dance music that's almost timeless in its appeal, reminiscent of an encyclopedia of sources, yet never – for more than an instant, anyway – completely familiar". A Billboard writer said, "[Nile] Rodgers' predictable arrangement sets up the rules [of the dance-funk genre], while Bowie's melodic structure and delivery methodically break them." NME placed "Let's Dance" at number 21 in its list of the best tracks of 1983.

== Music video ==
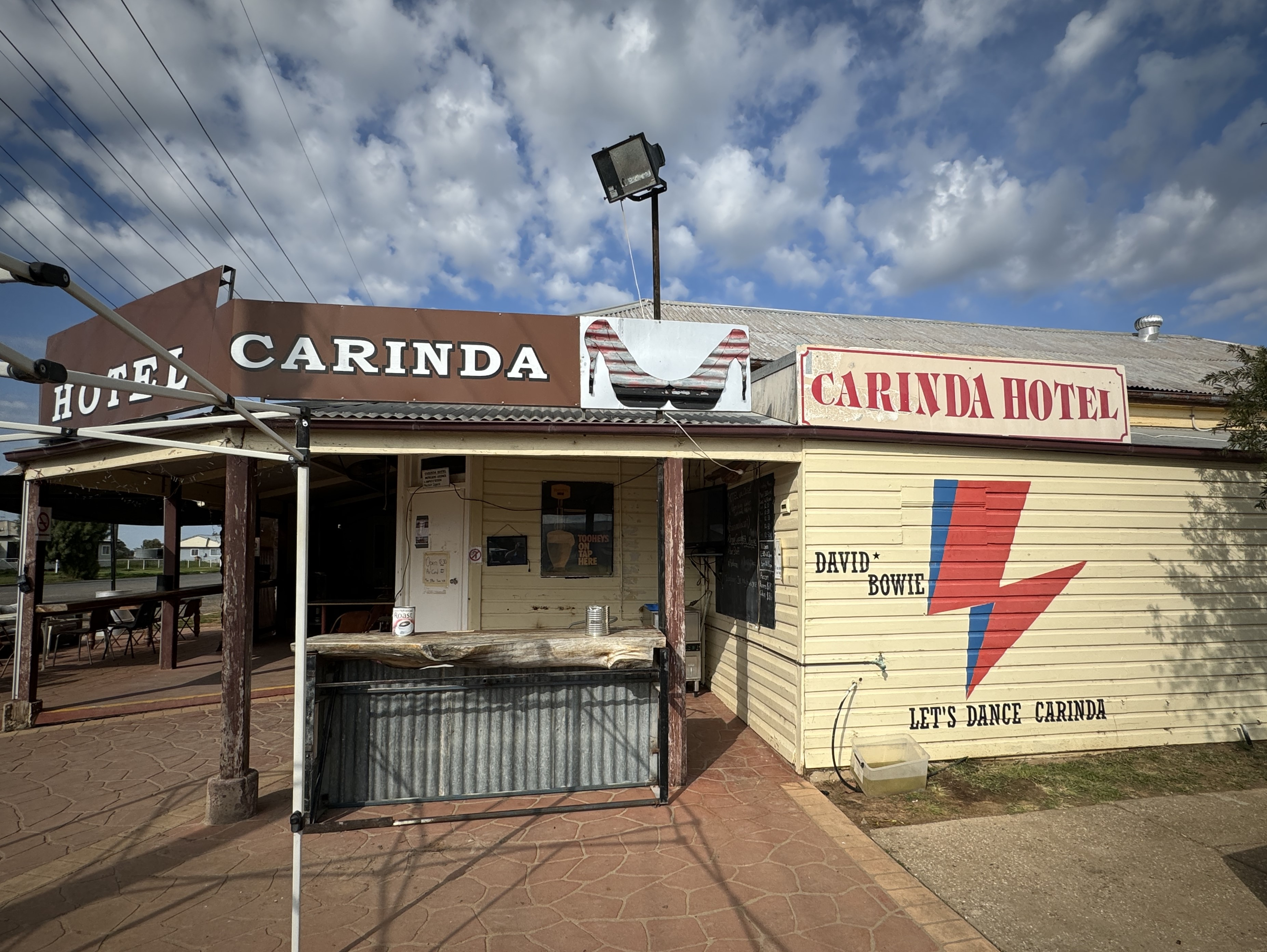
The Carinda Hotel, the pub where scenes with the dancing couple were filmed.

The music video for "Let's Dance" was shot in February 1983 in Australia, together with "China Girl", after Bowie officially signed with EMI. Co-directed by Bowie and his frequent video collaborator David Mallet, the video starred Terry Roberts and Joelene King, two students from Sydney's Aboriginal Islander Dance Theatre. Shooting locations included Sydney, the Warrumbungle National Park, a sheep-farming outpost in Carinda and a Carindan pub bar. (Note: According to the Australian website Broadsheet, parts were also filmed at The Strand Arcade, Broadway street in front of the University of Notre Dame Australia and a promontory on the Sydney Heads overlooking Sydney Harbour towards the Sydney central business district.) Bowie made appearances in the bar and in the middle of a field playing guitar. Buckley argues he appears "incredibly detached", as if delivering the lyrics with a "clenched jaw" and "acting out the song rather than singing it". He also notes that Bowie positions himself as "paternal narrator" rather than the protagonist for the first time.

In the video, which has little to do with the song itself, the Aboriginal couple visit an art gallery, eat a meal, work in a factory, clean for a white family and walk with friends barefoot in the outback. During the bar scenes, Roberts and King dance in the centre surrounded by an array of bar guests while Bowie and an extra one mime to the song wielding a guitar and upright bass, respectively. The bar guests were actual Carinda residents and were unaware of who Bowie was or that a music video was being filmed; their reactions towards the dancing couple were genuine. Video producer Ross Cameron later stated: "You couldn't pay actors to act the way they looked with these Aboriginals dancing in their bar." Additionally, manager Peter Lawless recalled: "It was so alien for both sides, Bowie and the locals. They didn't believe who he was. It was so off the wall. It was kind of weird."

It's a lot more straightforward than anything I've done in a long time. It's not so concerned with juxtaposing surreal images together. It's a very direct statement about integration of one culture with another.

— David Bowie, 1983

The video provides commentary on the treatment of Aboriginal Australians, particularly scenes depicting the boy being forced to drag machinery down a busy road and the girl being forced to clean the tarmac with water and a brush. At the time, Bowie said: "As much as I love this country, it's probably one of the most racially intolerant in the world, ... There's a lot of injustice, so let's, you know, say something about it." Mallet later said Bowie's "bottom line" was setting the video in Australia and making it politicised. An uneasy subject in the country at the time, the director explained that "a lot of people were horrified about what we were doing". In his book Strange Fascination, Buckley describes the video as "an attempt to articulate the clash of interests between white consumer capitalism and the Aboriginal traditions it displaced". Bowie added similar commentary to the videos of "China Girl" and "Loving the Alien" (1984).

The music video's only lyrical reference to the song is the use of red shoes, which appear in several scenes and represent several themes. Bowie explained:

The red shoes are a found symbol and it seemed a propos for this particular video. They are the simplicity of the capitalist society – the pair of luxury goods – red leather shoes. Also, they're the striving for success – black music is all about 'put on your red shoes, baby'. Those two qualities were right for the song and video.

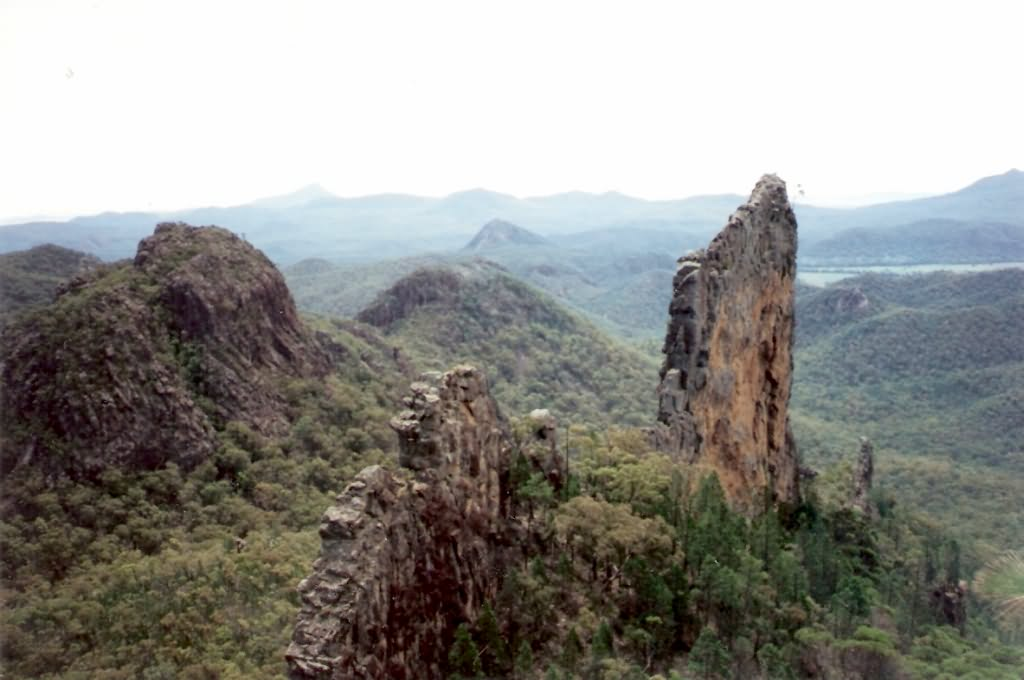
Part of the music video was shot at the Breadknife in Warrumbungle National Park.

The shoes are first found in a shop window by the Aboriginal couple, which Buckley says symbolises "conspicuous consumption". (Note: This sequence was later copied shot-for-shot by a 1990s advertising campaign for a, in Pegg's words, "reassuringly expensive" lager.) Additionally, the author says that a female factory boss wearing the outfit suggests "capitalistic domination" and the abuse of Aboriginals and general labour. Lastly, the Aboriginal girl finds the red shoes in the Australian outback, putting them on and seeing a vision of nuclear devastation. Buckley analyses the scene as symbolising the "twisted and corrupt result of unrestrained capitalism", effectively turning the shoes from a symbol of power and wealth to one of ill-fortune and corruption. The Aboriginals stomp the shoes into the dirt before leaving them to rot in the outback.

Bowie also appears at one point as a corporate manager, which Pegg believes suggests "an implicit anxiety about his own role as a global rock star, the ultimate cultural colonist". Additionally, there is a parody of American Express's then-current "That'll do nicely" commercial. Receiving heavy rotation on MTV, the video has received praise. Buckley writes: "'Let's Dance' champions the Aboriginal cause and is a visual precursor to the white Australian critique of the same subject by Midnight Oil." Pegg says the video remains "oblique" decades later, relying on various "powerful" metaphors to "dig deep into the Australian psyche". Frank Zappa's song "Be In My Video" from the 1984 album Them Or Us mocks music videos generally, particularly the "Let's Dance" video, as pompous and riddled with clichés.

A short documentary about the video's making, directed by Rubika Shah and Ed Gibbs and titled Let's Dance: Bowie Down Under, premiered at the Berlin International Film Festival in February 2015. In an interview, Shah argued that "['Let's Dance'] made Aboriginal people feel proud of their culture. They're not a spear-wielding tribal people out in the middle of nowhere. They live like everybody else does. But it was the first time that Aboriginals had been seen on global television like that." Following Bowie's death in 2016, the town of Carinda has held an annual festival celebrating Bowie's music and his association with the town, called "Let's Dance Carinda".

== Live performances ==
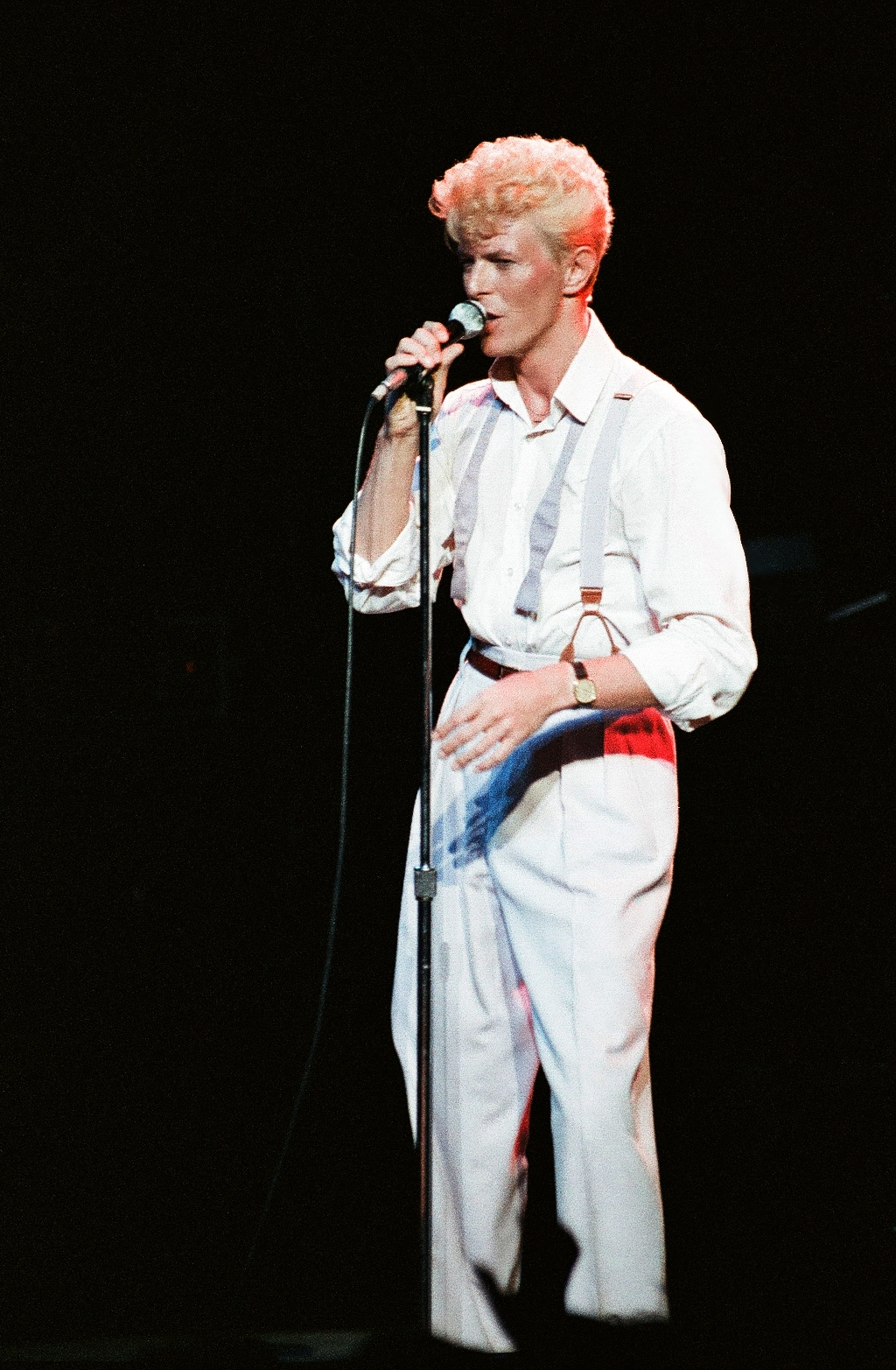
Bowie on the Serious Moonlight Tour. "Let's Dance" was a mainstay on the tour.

"Let's Dance" was a regular on the 1983 Serious Moonlight Tour, the name of which derived from the song's lyric. One performance, filmed on 12 September 1983 and featured in the Serious Moonlight concert film the following year, later appeared as the B-side of two releases: a 2015 limited edition Australian single commemorating the Melbourne residency of the David Bowie Is exhibition and the 2018 Record Store Day single release of the song's original demo. The song made return appearances on the 1987 Glass Spider and 1990 Sound+Vision tours; a performance on the former saw release on 1988's Glass Spider. Bowie also performed the song as a duet with the singer Tina Turner several times during the 1980s, the first being on 23 and 24 March 1983 at the National Exhibition Centre in Birmingham; the former performance was later released on CD and video in 2016 and charted at number 31 in France. Another 1985 live duet appeared on Turner's Live in Europe album in 1988.

Bowie dropped "Let's Dance" from his setlists in the 1990s, supposedly viewing it as a threat to his creativity; he even dismissed the song as the epitome of what he would not be performing on the 1995 Outside Tour. Nevertheless, "Let's Dance" made a one-off appearance at the Bridge School Benefit concert on 19 October 1996 in a stripped-down manner with Bowie and his then-bassist Gail Ann Dorsey on vocals. He announced during the show: "This started off as a joke for you all tonight, but we kind of got to like it. In fact, we prefer this version to the original!" It won a standing ovation.

The song again made return appearances during Bowie's summer shows in 2000, performed in a "dreamy acoustic style" that Pegg compares to "Wild Is the Wind" (1976) before returning to the original tempo on the first "tremble like a flower". The 25 June 2000 performance at the Glastonbury Festival was released in 2018 on Glastonbury 2000, while another recorded two days later was released on BBC Radio Theatre, London, 27 June 2000, a bonus disc accompanying the first release of Bowie at the Beeb in 2000. "Let's Dance" made further appearances on the 2002 Heathen and 2003–2004 A Reality tours.

== Legacy ==
The single edit of "Let's Dance" has appeared on numerous compilation albums, including Changesbowie (1990), The Singles Collection (1993), Best of Bowie (2002), The Platinum Collection (2006), Nothing Has Changed (2014) and Legacy (The Very Best of David Bowie) (2016). Both single and album cuts were remastered and released on the box set Loving the Alien (1983–1988) in 2018.

=== Retrospective appraisal ===
The song continues to be viewed positively, receiving praise for its catchiness, accessibility, commerciality and production. Writing for the BBC, David Quantick praised the "perfect" combination of Bowie and Rodgers. Discussing its accessibility, Stephen Thomas Erlewine of AllMusic said that, together with fellow singles "Modern Love" and "China Girl", the song boasts "just enough of an alien edge to make [it] distinctive". Buckley commented that "Bowie was never able to match its instant accessibility again". A writer of Classic Pop magazine said that despite being "a curious jumble of ideas", the song itself remains timeless and "quite the most 'danceable' track Bowie ever produced". Some also gave recognition to Vaughan's guitar contribution. Chris Ingalls of PopMatters wrote that the song is "all dancefloor swagger, with modern production touches meshing nicely with the song's bluesy edge".

Some have even called "Let's Dance" Bowie's most popular song. In AllMusic, Dave Thompson wrote that "[the song] is one of Bowie's most overtly commercial compositions" and "blessed by one of his most simplistic lyrics". The Guardian's Alexis Petridis said it "signaled his temporary abandonment of the avant-garde" but still remains "a superb song, nervier and stranger than its global smash status might suggest". In Bowie: A Biography, Marc Spitz considers "Let's Dance" "easily the most unconventional number-one hit single of the modern era" and further praises Bowie's vocal performance as his "most romantic and insistent" since "'Heroes'" (1977). In The Complete David Bowie, Pegg hails the song as one of Bowie's finest recordings of the 1980s and "undoubtedly" one of the best pop singles of all time.

Following Bowie's death in January 2016, the writers of Rolling Stone named "Let's Dance" one of the 30 most essential songs of Bowie's catalogue. The song has placed in other lists ranking Bowie's best songs by Smooth Radio (3), NME (6), The Guardian (18), Consequence of Sound (43) and Mojo (60). In 2018, the readers of NME voted the song Bowie's 20th best track. In a list ranking every Bowie single from worst to best, Ultimate Classic Rock placed it at number seven.

The song has been selected several times by the BBC Radio 4 Desert Island Discs programme, including by Lulu in 1987, Pete Waterman in 1995, John Bishop in 2012 and Noel Gallagher in 2015.

=== Cover versions and tributes ===
Rodgers has regularly played "Let's Dance" live, often joined by guests, including: Prince at the 2014 Essence Festival; Jimmy Fallon during a 2017 episode of Saturday Night Live; and Josh Homme, Chris Chaney and original drummer Omar Hakim at the Taylor Hawkins tribute concert on 3 September 2022. Billy Corgan of the Smashing Pumpkins also interpolated lines from "Let's Dance" into live performances of Joy Division's "Transmission" (1979).

The original song was sampled in Puff Daddy & the Family's 1997 hit "Been Around the World" and Craig David's 2007 single "Hot Stuff". Bowie also expressed enthusiasm for a 2009 mashup of "Let's Dance" and Lady Gaga's "Just Dance" by Jessica Lee Morgan. In 2003, the original track was radically reworked by EMI with Bowie's approval, as part of a remix project for release in Southeast Asian territories. Titled "Let's Dance (Club Bolly Mix)" and packaged with a "club mix" of "China Girl", the remix added sitars, tabla drums and Hindi backing vocals and was accompanied by a new music video produced by MTV Asia, which recast the original as a Bollywood-style romance. Bowie commented at the time: "Asian culture has had a fairly high profile within my work from the early 1970s. It was not a difficult decision to give a green light to these remixes. I think they're pretty cool." While different versions of the remixes appeared on promo CDs in Singapore and Hong Kong in August 2003, the actual remixes were released later the same year on the remix album Club Bowie and the limited-edition US reissue of Best of Bowie. Pegg says that while these remixes are not for everyone, they are "certainly among the most elaborate and interesting Bowie remixes ever released".

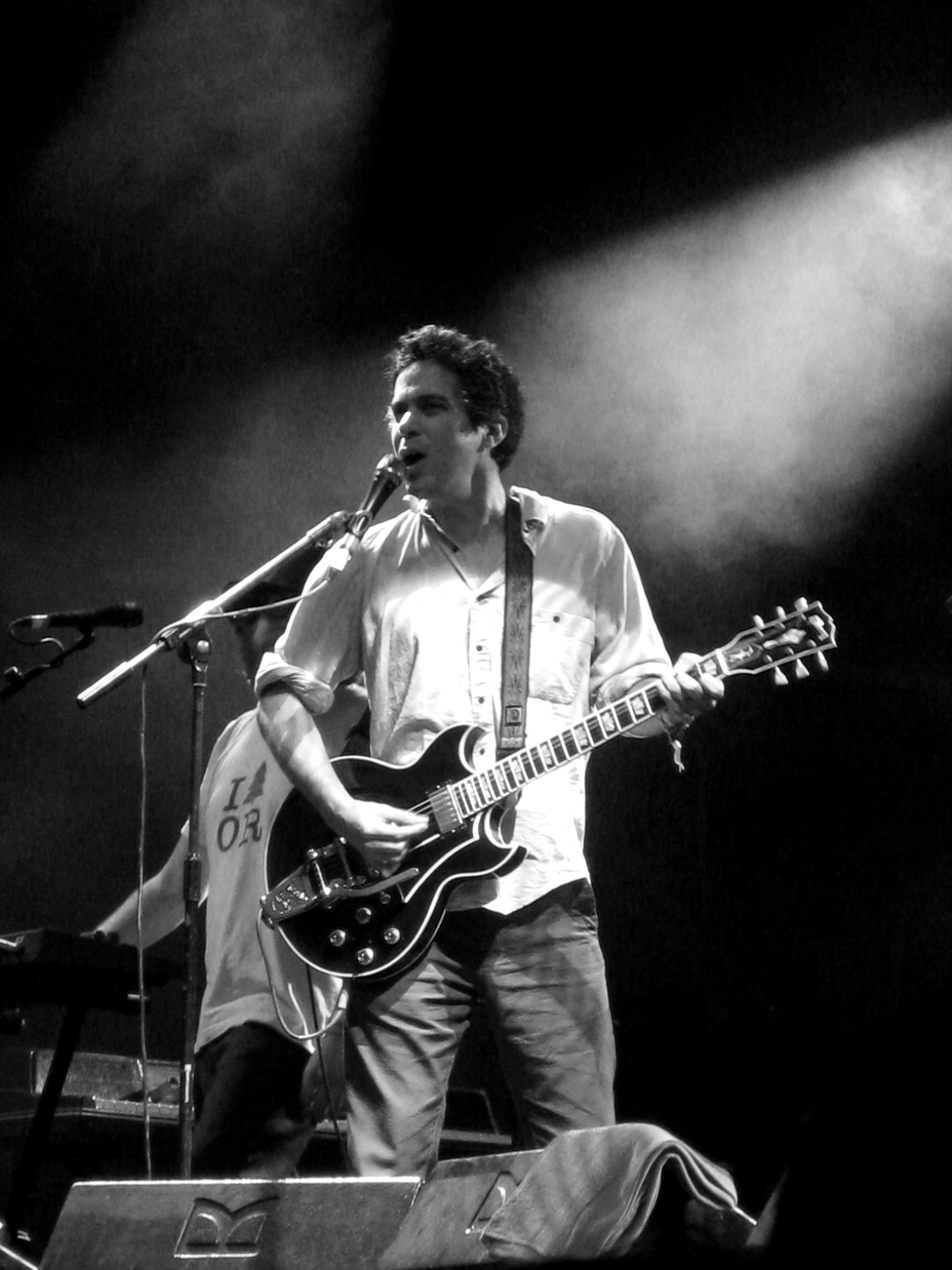
Musicians who have covered "Let's Dance" include M. Ward (pictured in 2009).

Artists who have covered "Let's Dance" for specific projects include the Futureheads for a CD called The Eighties, packaged with copies of Q magazine in 2006, and M. Ward for the Starbucks compilation Sounds Eclectic: The Covers Project in 2007. Discussing his cover with Spitz in 2009, M. Ward stated: "I always wanted to do a stripped down version of a dance song. The beautiful thing about 'Let's Dance', I found, are the lyrics. The production is great but it tends to hide the fact that the lyrics are so good." Spitz described his take on the song as a reimagined Nina Simone torch song. Also in 2007, Dutch outfit hi_tack enjoyed club chart success with several remixes of Bowie's original and a salsa-style cover by Stellarsound featuring Paula Flynn was released as a single after being featured in an Irish commercial for Ballygowan mineral water. In 2014, will.i.am and his protégés played the song during the semi-final of the BBC's The Voice; Pegg says the artist "brutally assaulted" it.

=== Appearances in media ===
"Let's Dance" has appeared on the soundtracks of the films Private Parts (1997), Zoolander (2001), We Own the Night (2007) and The Boat That Rocked (2009). In Zoolander, a short snippet of the song plays during Bowie's cameo, accompanied by a freeze-frame. Pegg describes his cameo as "willingly sending up the media's image of him as the ultimate arbiter of cool". The song also appears in the video games Elite Beat Agents (2006) and Sackboy: A Big Adventure (2020). Additionally, "Let's Dance" was serviced as the backing track for a 2008 Marks & Spencer womenswear commercial.

== Personnel ==
According to Chris O'Leary and Benoît Clerc:

- David Bowie – lead vocals
- Stevie Ray Vaughan – lead guitar
- Nile Rodgers – rhythm guitar
- Carmine Rojas – bass guitar
- Omar Hakim – drums
- Robert Sabino – Hammond organ, keyboards
- Mac Gollehon – trumpet
- Robert Aaron – tenor saxophone
- Stan Harrison – tenor saxophone
- Steve Elson – baritone saxophone
- Sammy Figueroa – woodblocks, congas, tambourine
- Frank Simms – backing vocals
- George Simms – backing vocals
- David Spinner – backing vocals

Technical

- David Bowie – producer
- Nile Rodgers – producer
- Bob Clearmountain – engineer
- Dave Greenberg – assistant sound engineer

== Charts ==
=== Weekly charts ===
1983 weekly chart performance for "Let's Dance"
Chart (1983)	Peak position
Australia (Kent Music Report)	2
Austria (Ö3 Austria Top 40)	2
Belgium (Ultratop 50 Flanders)	1
Canada (CHUM)	1
Canada Top Singles (RPM)	1
Denmark (Årets Singlehitliste)	1
Europe (Eurochart Hot 100)	1
Finland (Suomen virallinen lista)	1
France (IFOP)	2
Iceland (Íslenski Listinn)	1
Ireland (IRMA)	1
Israel (Israeli Singles Chart)	1
Italy (Musica e dischi)	2
Luxembourg (Radio Luxembourg)	1
Netherlands (Dutch Top 40)	1
Netherlands (Single Top 100)	1
New Zealand (Recorded Music NZ)	1
Norway (VG-lista)	1
Poland (ZPAV)	5
Portugal (Música & Som)	1
Spain (AFYVE)	4
Spain (Los 40 Principales)	1
South Africa (Springbok Radio)	2
Sweden (Sverigetopplistan)	1
Switzerland (Schweizer Hitparade)	1
UK Singles (Official Charts)	1
US Billboard Hot 100	1
US Hot Dance/Disco (Billboard)	1
US Hot R&B/Hip-Hop Songs (Billboard)	14
US Mainstream Rock Airplay (Billboard)	8
US Cash Box Top 100	1
West Germany (GfK)	2

2016 weekly chart performance for "Let's Dance"
Chart (2016)	Peak position
Austria (Ö3 Austria Top 40)	54
Canada (Canadian Digital Songs)	44
France (SNEP)	21
Germany (GfK)	73
Ireland (IRMA)	37
Italy (FIMI)	50
Japan Hot 100 (Billboard)	53
Netherlands (Single Top 100)	67
New Zealand (Recorded Music NZ)	40
Portugal (AFP)	37
Spain (Promusicae)	77
Sweden (Sverigetopplistan)	64
Switzerland (Schweizer Hitparade)	25
UK Singles (Official Charts)	23
US Digital Song Sales (Billboard)	35
US Hot Rock & Alternative Songs (Billboard)	7

=== Year-end charts ===
Year-end charts for "Let's Dance"
Chart (1983)	Position
Australia (Kent Music Report)	24
Austria (Ö3 Austria Top 40)	16
Belgium (Ultratop 50 Flanders)	2
Canada Top Singles (RPM)	3
France (IFOP)	9
Netherlands (Dutch Top 40)	10
Netherlands (Single Top 100)	14
New Zealand (Recorded Music NZ)	2
Switzerland (Schweizer Hitparade)	10
UK Singles (OCC)	4
US Billboard Hot 100	18
US Cash Box Top 100	4
West Germany (Official German Charts)	19

Chart (2016)	Position
US Hot Rock Songs (Billboard)	99

Chart (2019)	Position
Portugal (AFP)	1641

=== All-time charts ===
All-time charts for "Let's Dance"
Chart (1958–2018)	Position
US Billboard Hot 100	583

== Certifications and sales ==
Sales and certifications for "Let's Dance"
Region	Certification	Certified units/sales
Canada (Music Canada)	Platinum	100,000^{^}
Denmark (IFPI Danmark)	Gold	45,000^{‡}
France (SNEP)	Gold	800,000
France (SNEP) 2018 remaster release	Gold	100,000^{‡}
Germany Maxi single	—	70,000
Italy (FIMI) sales since 2009	Gold	25,000^{‡}
Japan	—	100,000
New Zealand (RMNZ)	2× Platinum	60,000^{‡}
Spain (Promusicae)	Gold	30,000^{‡}
Sweden (GLF)	2× Gold	
United Kingdom (BPI) 1983 physical release	Gold	500,000^{^}
United Kingdom (BPI) 2004 digital release	2× Platinum	1,200,000^{‡}
United States (RIAA)	Gold	1,000,000^{^}
^{^} Shipments figures based on certification alone.^{‡} Sales+streaming figures based on certification alone.
