= Let's Dance (David Bowie album) =

1983 studio album by David Bowie

Studio album by David Bowie
- Released: 14 April 1983
- Recorded: December 1982
- Studios: Power Station, New York City
- Genres: Post-disco; dance-rock; new wave; dance-pop
- Length: 39:42
- Label: EMI America
- Producers: David Bowie; Nile Rodgers

David Bowie chronology
| Rare (1982) | Let's Dance (1983) | Golden Years (1983) |

Singles from Let's Dance
- 1. "Let's Dance" Released: 14 March 1983; 2. "China Girl" Released: 31 May 1983; 3. "Modern Love" Released: 12 September 1983; 4. "Without You" Released: November 1983 (US)

Let's Dance is the fifteenth studio album by the English singer-songwriter David Bowie, released on 14 April 1983 through EMI America Records. Co-produced by Bowie and Nile Rodgers, the album was recorded in December 1982 at the Power Station in New York City. The sessions featured players from Rodgers' band Chic and the then-unknown Texas blues guitarist Stevie Ray Vaughan on lead guitar. For the first time on an album, Bowie only sang and played no instruments.

Musically, Let's Dance has been described as a post-disco record, with elements of dance-rock, dance-pop and new wave. The album contains two cover songs: Iggy Pop's "China Girl", which Bowie and Pop had recorded together for Pop's The Idiot (1977), and Metro's "Criminal World". It also includes a reworking of "Cat People (Putting Out Fire)", originally recorded by Bowie and Giorgio Moroder in 1982 for the film of the same name.

Let's Dance was released to massive commercial success, reaching number one in numerous countries, and turned Bowie into a major superstar; it remains Bowie's best-selling album. The record's four singles, including the title track, were all commercially successful. The album received mixed reviews from critics whose opinions on the artistic content varied. "Let's Dance" and "China Girl" were supported by music videos that received heavy airplay on MTV. The album was supported by the successful Serious Moonlight Tour throughout 1983.

Despite the album's success, Let's Dance began a period of low creativity for Bowie. Critics accused him of pandering to his newly acquired audience, reflected in poor reviews for his follow-up albums, Tonight (1984) and Never Let Me Down (1987). He later reflected poorly on the period, referring to it as his "Phil Collins years". The album was remastered in 2018 and included in the box set Loving the Alien (1983–1988).

== Background ==
David Bowie released his 14th studio album Scary Monsters (and Super Creeps) in 1980. With the record, Bowie achieved what biographer David Buckley calls "the perfect balance" of creativity and mainstream success. Following the sessions, Bowie portrayed the lead role of Joseph "John" Merrick in the Broadway play The Elephant Man between late July 1980 and early January 1981. During this time, he also filmed an appearance in the Uli Edel film Christiane F. (1981).

The murder of John Lennon in December 1980 affected Bowie deeply; (Note: Bowie and Lennon became friends in the mid-1970s and collaborated with each other for "Fame" and a cover of Lennon's Beatles song "Across the Universe", both released on Bowie's 1975 album Young Americans. In a 1999 interview with In the Studio, Bowie claimed that "I was second on [assassin Mark David Chapman's] list".) he cancelled an upcoming Scary Monsters tour and withdrew to his home in Switzerland, becoming a recluse but continuing to work. In July 1981, he collaborated with Giorgio Moroder for "Cat People (Putting Out Fire)", the title song of the Paul Schrader film Cat People (1982), and in the same session, recorded "Under Pressure" with the rock band Queen. Shortly after, he played the title role in a BBC adaptation of Bertolt Brecht's play Baal, directed by Alan Clarke. Recorded in August 1981 and transmitted in March 1982, Bowie also recorded an accompanying soundtrack EP, released through RCA in February to coincide with the transmission. During the year, Bowie filmed appearances in The Hunger and Merry Christmas, Mr. Lawrence, both released in 1983. During filming for Merry Christmas, Mr. Lawrence, he grew fond of artists from the 1950s and 1960s, including James Brown, Buddy Guy, Elmore James and Albert King. Their musical ideals greatly influenced the new album.

Scary Monsters was Bowie's final studio album for RCA Records, his label since Hunky Dory (1971). Having grown increasingly dissatisfied with the label, who he felt was "milking" his back catalogue, he was also eager for the September 1982 expiration of his 1975 severance settlement with his old manager Tony Defries. Although RCA was willing to re-sign, alongside Columbia and Geffen Records, Bowie signed a new contract with EMI America Records for an estimated $17 million.

== Development ==
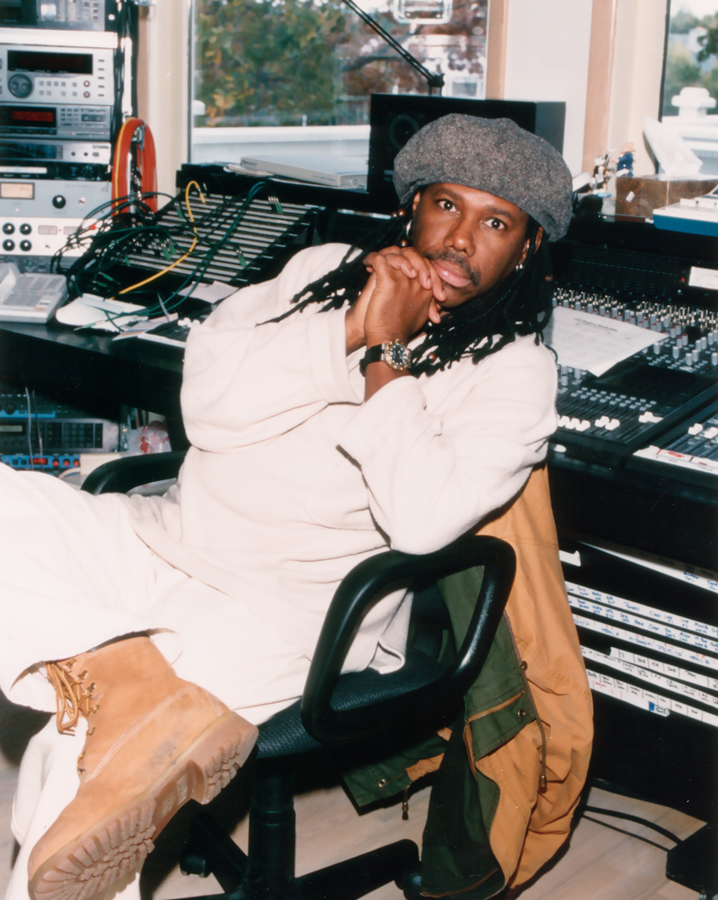
Wanting a commercial hit, Bowie hired Nile Rodgers (pictured in 1999) to co-produce the album.

With a new label and an idea for a commercial sound, Bowie wanted to begin fresh with a new producer. He chose Nile Rodgers of the R&B band Chic, one of the most commercially successful bands of the late 1970s, with hits such as "Le Freak" (1978) and "Good Times" (1979). According to biographer Nicholas Pegg, contemporary listeners considered Rodgers' writing and production work, including Sister Sledge's "We Are Family" (1979) and Diana Ross's "Upside Down" (1980), to be "dance classics". Bowie and Rodgers met each other at the Continental in New York City in autumn 1982, where they found they had similar influences in old blues and R&B music. Speaking to Musician in 1983, Rodgers said: "David could have had any producer – white or black – he wanted. He could have gone with Quincy Jones and a more sure-fire chance at a hit. But he called me up, and for that I feel honoured."

Tony Visconti, the producer of Bowie's last four studio albums, was originally scheduled to produce the new album and set time aside to record. However, Bowie failed to tell Visconti that he chose Rodgers for the project; Visconti eventually learned through Bowie's assistant, Coco Schwab, closer to December 1982. Visconti was deeply hurt, and the move damaged the two men's relationship, and Visconti did not work with Bowie on a studio album again until 2002's Heathen, nearly 20 years later. In a 2023 interview with SuperDeluxeEdition, Visconti stated that in hindsight, he believed Bowie was right to seek out a new producer given his desire for commercial success, drawing comparisons with his own work with other artists in between Bowie projects.

Bowie and Rodgers regrouped at Rodgers' home in Montreux, Switzerland, to begin demo work. The producer, who was expecting to make Scary Monsters 2, was surprised to learn Bowie had a different idea, saying "'Nile, I really want you to make hits.' And I was sort of taken aback, because I'd always assumed that David Bowie did art first, and then if it happened to become a hit, so be it!" The producer was initially disappointed he could not use the record to earn respect from white audiences, but knew he would do what he did best to guarantee a hit. Bowie played his new songs on a twelve-string acoustic guitar, starting with "Let's Dance" in a soft vocal arrangement. Rodgers knew it was not a dance song, but took old '50s and '60s records to arrange the track into the finished product. Over three days, the two demoed the new tracks, with assistance from the Turkish multi-instrumentalist Erdal Kızılçay, who later became a frequent collaborator of Bowie's.

== Recording ==
This is the fastest I've ever worked in my life. Bowie said he likes to work [fast] and I plan to do the same for the rest of my career. It's just the most energetic way to make records. The musicians were really pumped up because of the fast pace, and as a result we got some great performances.

— Nile Rodgers, 1983

Let's Dance was recorded at the Power Station in New York City (where Bowie had also recorded Scary Monsters) during the first three weeks of December 1982, (Note: In his book Ashes to Ashes, biographer Chris O'Leary writes that the title track's demo was recorded on 19 December 1982 and the album itself was recorded from 3–20 January 1983.) and was completed in 17 days. The engineer for the sessions was Bob Clearmountain. Rodgers felt that the record's sound was aided by the ambience of the studio: "The Power Station is famous for its great drum sound. And we had great players too." Along with a new producer, an entirely new set of musicians were hired for the record, with Bowie stating: "I wanted to have a little relief from the guys that I usually work with. I wanted to try people that I'd never worked with before, so that I couldn't predict how they were going to play." (Note: Pegg notes that it was the first time since Space Oddity (1969) that Bowie had not kept at least one musician from the previous album.) Long-time collaborator Carlos Alomar, who had worked with Bowie since the mid-1970s and continued to work with Bowie into the mid-1990s, was originally scheduled to contribute, but claimed he was offered an "embarrassing" fee and declined. In 1984, Alomar clarified he did not play on Let's Dance because he was only given two weeks' notice and was already booked with other work.

With Alomar gone, Rodgers took his place on rhythm guitar. The producer also recruited his regular Chic collaborators: keyboardist Robert Sabino, percussionist Sammy Figueroa and backing vocalists Frank and George Simms. The remaining musicians included drummer Omar Hakim (whom Bowie called "a fascinating drummer with impeccable timing"); bassist Carmine Rojas; trumpeter Mac Gollehon; and saxophonists Stan Harrison, Robert Aaron and Steve Elson. Near the end of the sessions, Rodgers hired Chic drummer Tony Thompson and bassist Bernard Edwards for additional work; he was reluctant to hire them earlier due to their past drug use. Due to their arrival time, Thompson and Edwards' contributions were limited, appearing on only three tracks and one track, respectively. Edwards recorded his part for "Without You" in 13 minutes, with Rodgers later writing in his memoir, "I was never more proud of him in my life and it happened on the last day of basic recording." For the first time ever, Bowie himself played no instruments on the album, stating at the time: "I don't play a damned thing. This was a singer's album." He recorded all of his vocals in two days.

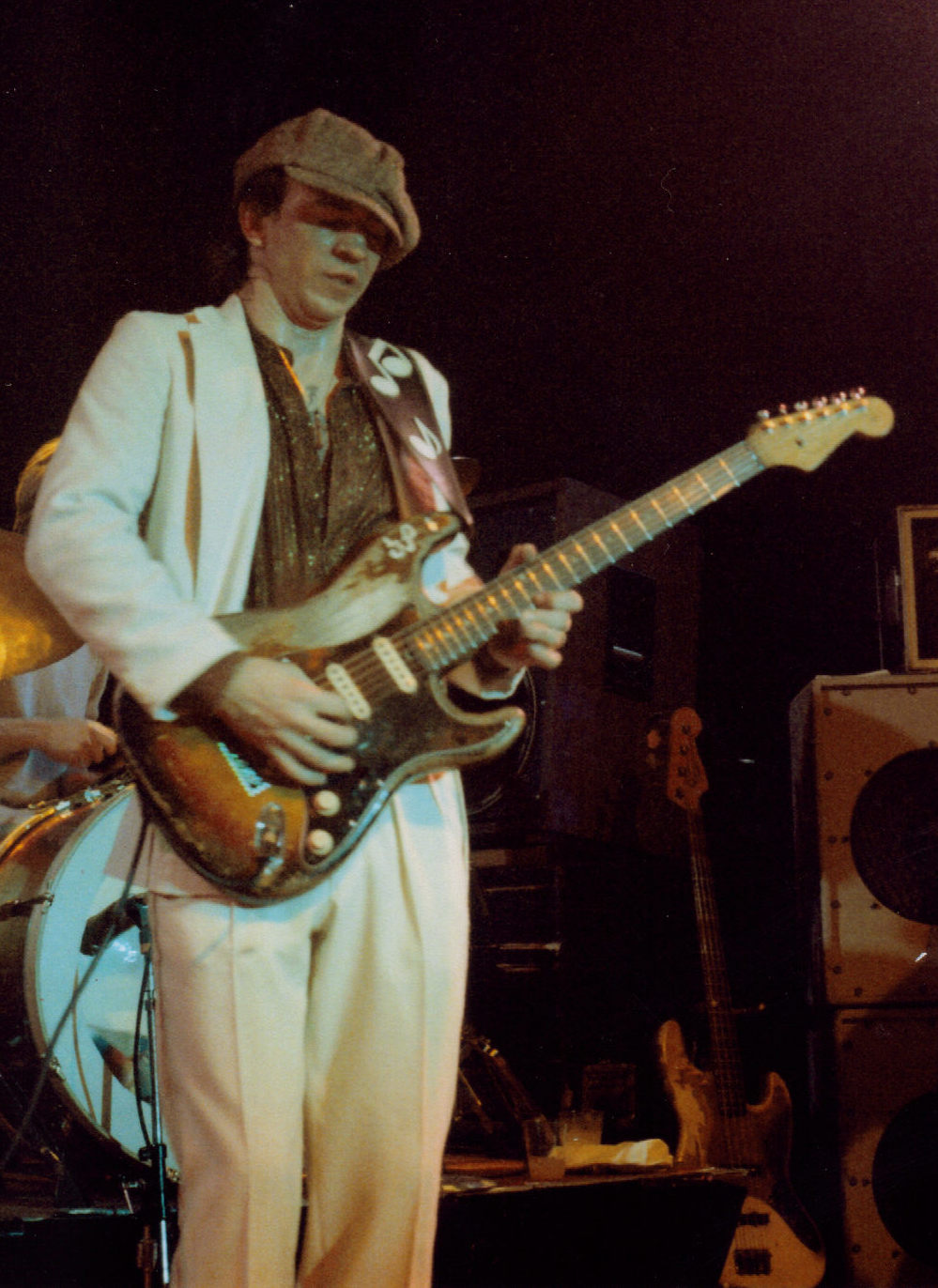
Blues guitarist Stevie Ray Vaughan (pictured in 1983) plays lead guitar on the record.

At the 1982 Montreux Jazz Festival in Switzerland, Bowie saw Stevie Ray Vaughan play guitar. At the time, Vaughan was an unknown 27-year-old blues guitarist from Texas; his debut album with his band Double Trouble was still unreleased. "He really bowled me over with his playing," Bowie recalled of the performance in a 1983 interview. "I thought he was one of the most exciting new blues guitarists I’d seen in years." In the months that followed, Bowie sought him out to enlist him as the album's lead guitarist. Rodgers was initially unimpressed with Vaughan, believing he sounded like American blues guitarist Albert King. Bowie however felt Vaughan was different, saying "he's got a whole other thing going on." Vaughan recorded his guitar overdubs towards the end of the sessions. According to author Paul Trynka, he used an old Fender Stratocaster plugged into an old Fender amplifier, "all the tone coming from the player". In a contemporary interview, Vaughan described the recording sessions: "Bowie is real easy to work with. He knows what he's doing in the studio and he doesn't mess around ... He'd give his opinion on the stuff he liked and the stuff that needed work. Almost everything was cut in one or two takes. I think there was only one thing that needed three takes." According to Vaughan's biographers Joe Patoski and Bill Crawford, Vaughan played on six of the album's eight songs. In the biography Strange Fascination, Buckley found Vaughan to be a "bizarre" choice for lead guitarist, as at the time, he was "about as far away from Robert Fripp and Adrian Belew as you could get". Bowie and Rodgers praised Vaughan's work on the album, with Rodgers becoming one of Vaughan's closest friends after the sessions.

After the sessions concluded, Bowie went on holiday in Mexico, (Note: He filmed a cameo appearance for the Mel Damski film Yellowbeard (1983) here.) before returning to New York to finish post-production work and close his deal with EMI America at the end of January 1983. Upon closure, Bowie delivered Let's Dance to the label and departed for Australia to film music videos for the first two singles.

== Songs ==
Commentators characterise the songs on Let's Dance as post-disco, dance, dance-rock, new wave and dance-pop. Consequence of Sound calls the record "the sound in favour of pure disco, dance, and funk with Bowie coming down to earth" and that Bowie built upon the post-punk and new wave sound of its predecessor. The author James E. Perone notes the blues-edge added by Vaughan, praising his contributions on "Modern Love", "China Girl" and "Without You". In an interview with Details magazine in 1991, Bowie described the album as "a rediscovery of white-English-ex-art-school-student-meets-black-American-funk, a refocusing of Young Americans (1975)". The artist Tanja Stark sees the commercial tempo of the album masking the lyrical continuity of Bowie's ongoing narratives of spiritual struggle and death anxieties.

=== Side one ===
The opening track, "Modern Love", is an uptempo pop song that features a call-and-response structure inspired by Little Richard. AllMusic's Dave Thompson calls it "[a] high-energy, effervescent rocker" that "epitomises all that was good about Bowie's 1983 reinvention as a willing superstar". Pegg praises the music but calls the lyrics "superficial" compared to Bowie's previous work, as does Perone, who comments "some of the lyrics are clearer than others". O'Leary compares the lyrics to a flowchart, moving from "modern love" to "church on time" to "God and man".

"China Girl" was written by Bowie and Iggy Pop in 1976, first appearing on Pop's 1977 debut solo album The Idiot, which Bowie himself co-wrote and produced. Buckley calls Bowie's version an "ultra-cool reading" of Pop's original. For his version, Bowie added backing vocals while Rodgers composed the guitar riff. O'Leary writes that Bowie's vocal is more "playful" than Pop's, with the music itself exhibiting "Asian" qualities. BBC Online reviewer David Quantick acknowledged the effect of Rodgers' production on the song, arguing that "nobody but Rodgers could have taken a song like 'China Girl', with its paranoid references to 'visions of swastikas', and turned it into a sweet, romantic hit single". Pegg calls Bowie's rendition "a tremendously effective slice of hardcore pop", commenting that the lyrics reflect the album's overarching themes of "cultural identity" and "desperate love".

Pegg considers the title track to be one of Bowie's finest 1980s recordings and one of the "all-time great pop songs". It was described by Ed Power in the Irish Examiner as "a decent chunk of funk-rock"; Perone finds that it represents the contemporary dance craze of the 1980s. It opens with a group of singers getting louder and louder before it explodes into a massive climax. O'Leary and Pegg compare the intro to the Beatles' version of "Twist and Shout" (1963). The seven-minute album version features different instrumental solos than the shorter single version. The lyrics instruct the listener to "put on your red shoes" and dance under the "serious moonlight".

"Without You" harkens back to Bowie's 1960s recordings, reflecting 1960s-style pop. Pegg considers it a "throwaway love song" and the album's low point, disregarding both the music and lyrics. O'Leary similarly criticises Bowie's vocal performance, done in a "fragile falsetto". On the other hand, Ken Tucker of Rolling Stone wrote that "Without You" featured some of the most daring songwriting of Bowie's career and complimented his vocal performance.

=== Side two ===
Biographers found "Ricochet" the only track reminiscent of the experimental nature of Bowie's late-1970s recordings. Perone finds it out of place with the rest of the album and suggests the artist was entering an artistic low point. Pegg writes that it has an R&B and swing-style repetitive backing vocal. Describing the track in 1987, Bowie stated: "I thought it was a great song, and the beat wasn't quite right. It didn't roll the way it should have, the syncopation was wrong. It had an ungainly gait; it should have flowed. ... Nile did his own thing to it, but it wasn't quite what I'd had in mind when I wrote the thing."

"Criminal World" was originally written and recorded by Metro in 1977, but their version was banned by the BBC for its bisexual undertones. O'Leary states that Bowie included it on Let's Dance as a way to "sneak a transgressive song onto a platinum record". Pegg writes that Bowie updated its sound to match Let's Dance, featuring a new wave and pop reggae groove, and calls Vaughan's guitar solo his finest on the record. Both Buckley and O'Leary praise Bowie's rendition as a strong cover.

"Cat People (Putting Out Fire)" was recorded in 1981 by Bowie and Giorgio Moroder as the theme song for the 1982 film Cat People. Bowie was unhappy with the original version and asked Rodgers to remake it for Let's Dance. O'Leary describes the remake as "more aggressive". He praises Vaughan's guitar solo as superior to the original, but criticises Bowie's vocals as inferior. Pegg also considers the Let's Dance version to be inferior and laments that the remake became the better known version.

The album ends with "Shake It", which Pegg calls "a likable enough piece of fluff". O'Leary describes the track as a summary of Bowie's "bad habits" of the 1980s: "an indifference to quality". Biographer Marc Spitz writes that its sound is a precursor to U2's 1993 song "Lemon".

== Release ==
=== Music videos ===
After delivering the album to the label, Bowie travelled to Australia in February 1983 to film the music videos for the first two singles, "Let's Dance" and "China Girl". He directed the video for "Let's Dance" with David Mallet, the director of Bowie's Lodger and "Ashes to Ashes" videos. The video has nothing to do with the song itself, except for a brief glimpse of red shoes. It follows a young Australian Aboriginal couple doing various activities that seduce them to the commercialism of white urban Australia. Bowie appears and sings the lyrics into the camera. The video is an allegory meant to represent the treatment of Aboriginals by white Australian capitalists. The video for "China Girl", again directed by Mallet, is similar in its theme of clashing perspectives, juxtaposing Sydney executives against the city's Chinese population. It features New Zealand actress Geeling Ng who recreates the famous beach scene from From Here to Eternity (1953) with Bowie. Buckley says that the provocative allegories and scenes of the videos guaranteed heavy rotation on MTV.

=== Singles ===
"Let's Dance" was released through EMI America in edited form as the lead single on 14 March 1983, with the remake of "Cat People" as the B-side. Three days later, Bowie held a press conference in London where he announced the new album, also titled Let's Dance, the new label and the upcoming tour. He donned a new look, featuring bleached blonde hair and a white suit. A few days later, the "Let's Dance" video premiered on the UK rock show The Tube, along with interviews by Jools Holland. By the following week, "Let's Dance" entered the UK Singles Chart at number five, before peaking at number one for three weeks, and remaining on the chart for 14 weeks. It further peaked at number one on the US Billboard Hot 100 in April, becoming Bowie's biggest charting single to date. According to Buckley, the single was played "endlessly" on UK radio stations.

EMI America issued Let's Dance on 14 April 1983, with the catalogue number AML 3029. Its cover artwork, depicting Bowie shadow-boxing against a city skyline, was taken by photographer Greg Gorman. "China Girl" was released, again in edited form, as the album's second single on 31 May, with "Shake It" as the B-side. Although it failed to replicate the success of the title track, it still peaked at number two on the UK Singles Chart in June, held off the top spot by the Police's "Every Breath You Take". In the US, it peaked at number ten on the Billboard Hot 100.

"Modern Love" was released, again in edited form, as the album's third single on 12 September 1983. The B-side was a live version, recorded in Montreal on 13 July. Like "China Girl", "Modern Love" peaked at number two in the UK, held off the top spot by Culture Club's "Karma Chameleon". In the US, it charted at number 14. It was supported by a music video, directed by Jim Yukich, depicting a performance of the song in Philadelphia on 20 July. "Without You" appeared as the fourth and final single in November, backed by "Criminal World", released only in Holland, Japan, Spain and the US, where it reached number 73.

== Commercial performance ==
Upon release, Let's Dance entered the UK Albums Chart at number one and stayed there for three weeks. Although Aladdin Sane, Pin Ups (both 1973) and Diamond Dogs (1974) were at the top position longer, Let's Dance remained on the chart for over a year. The album peaked at number four on the US Billboard Top LPs & Tape chart on 24 June 1983, and remained on the chart for 69 weeks. EMI declared Let's Dance to be their fastest-selling record since the Beatles' Sgt. Pepper's Lonely Hearts Club Band (1967). Bowie's old label RCA issued a collection of Bowie's back catalogue as a way to cash in on its success. All of Bowie's albums he released between 1969 and 1974: Space Oddity, The Man Who Sold the World, Hunky Dory, The Rise and Fall of Ziggy Stardust and the Spiders from Mars, Aladdin Sane, Pin Ups and Diamond Dogs, as well as Low and "Heroes" (both 1977), began to chart again. By July, Bowie had ten albums in the UK top 100. This feat made Bowie the artist with the second highest number of individual album-weeks of all time – with 198, behind the rock band Dire Straits, who achieved 217 individual album-weeks in 1986.

Let's Dance has sold 10.7 million copies worldwide, making it Bowie's best-selling album.

== Critical reception ==
Professional ratings
Initial reviews
Review scores
| Source | Rating |
|---|---|
| Rolling Stone | 4/5 stars |
| Smash Hits | 6½/10 |
| The Village Voice | B |

Despite the album's major commercial success, it received mixed reviews from music critics, with opinions varying on the artistic content. In Musician magazine, David Fricke called it "Bowie at his best". In a piece on Bowie for Time in July 1983, Jay Cocks described the album as "unabashedly commercial, melodically alliterative and lyrically smart at the same time". Robert Christgau felt that it had a "perfunctory professional surface", and that other than the "interesting" "Modern Love", Let's Dance was "pleasantly pointless". Steve Bush of Smash Hits found it overall dull, and Debra Rae Cohen of The New York Times deemed it Bowie's "most artless" record yet, but one whose familiar dance music is "almost timeless in its appeal". Tucker felt Let's Dance sounded great, with an intelligent simplicity and a "surface beauty", but that as a whole it was "thin and niggling", other than "Modern Love", "Without You" and "Shake It", which offered "some of the most daring songwriting of Bowie's career".

Writing for Record magazine, Carol Cooper called the album "the Young Americans of the '80s" and enjoyed Rodgers' involvement, writing that his presence allows Bowie to shine through. However, she felt all the tracks were "rather modest". More positively, NME's Charles Shaar Murray gave unanimous praise to the album, calling it "some of the strongest, simplest and least complicated music that Bowie has ever made." Further describing it as "warm, strong, inspiring and useful", he approved of Vaughan's contributions, saying he gives the songs a more "traditional" feel. John Walker of Trouser Press hailed it as a record that "simply bleaches the competition", one that represents "the closest Bowie has come to capturing pure energy". Offering further praise, Billboard deemed it "Bowie's most accessible music in years", Cash Box hailed it as his "most danceable album to date", and Commonweal called it "some of the most exciting R&B-based dance music in years."

NME placed Let's Dance at number 13 in its end-of-the-year list. In The Village Voice's annual Pazz & Jop critics' poll for the year's best albums, Let's Dance finished at number 19.

== Tour ==
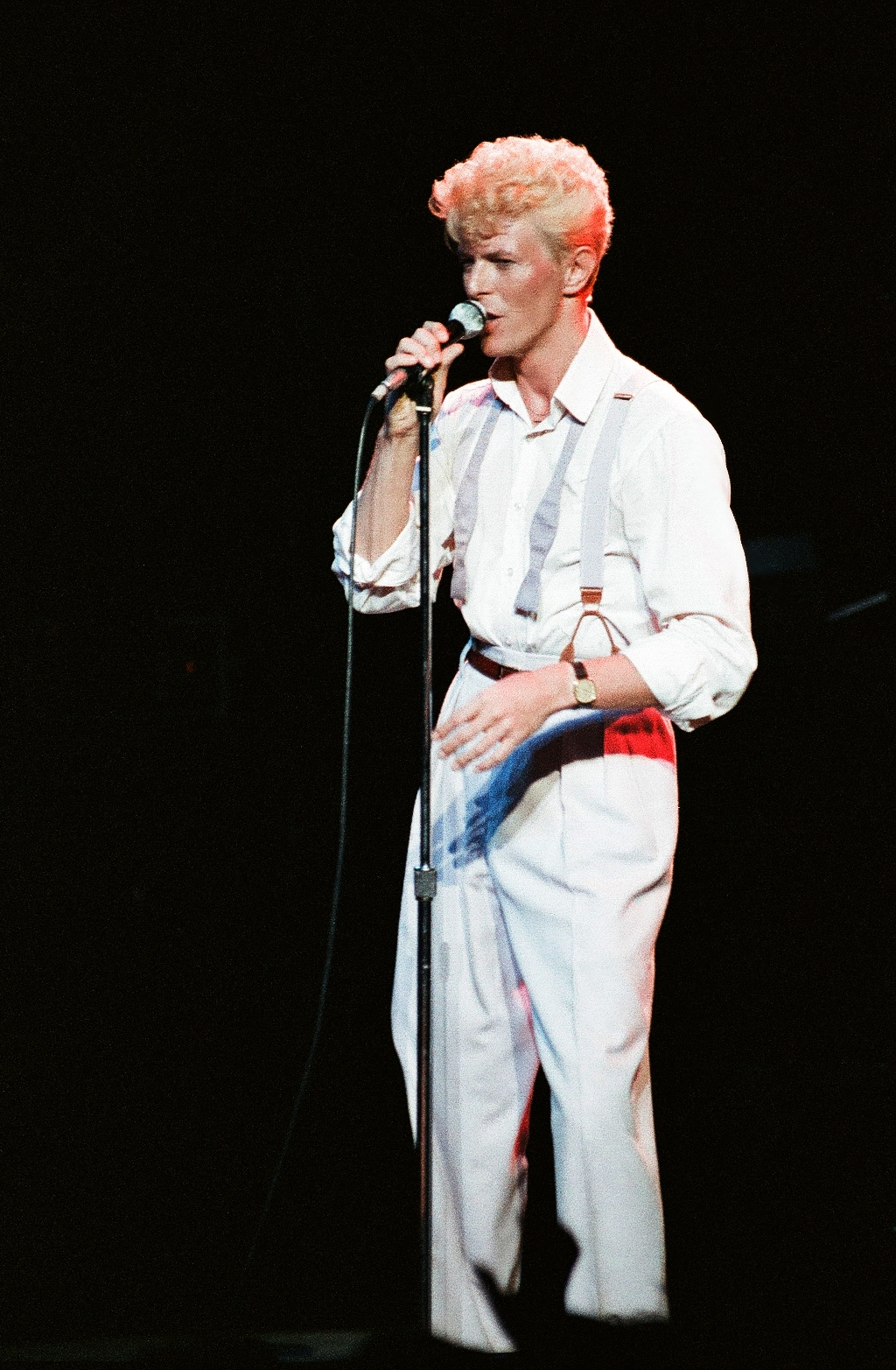
Bowie performing on the Serious Moonlight Tour in 1983

To support Let's Dance, Bowie embarked on his first concert tour in five years, the Serious Moonlight Tour, which ran from 18 May to 8 December 1983. Taking its title from a lyric in the title track, rehearsals began in the spring of 1983, with Alomar back as bandleader. The majority of the Let's Dance musicians returned, with the exception of Vaughan, who was present for rehearsals but let go by Bowie just days before the European leg was scheduled to begin. His dismissal was attributed to his alcohol and drug use, his request that his band Double Trouble be the supporting act, which Bowie denied, and his alleged displeasure to Bowie miming his guitar solo in the "Let's Dance" video. Vaughan's replacement was Diamond Dogs Tour (1974) and Station to Station (1976) guitarist Earl Slick.

The tour's set pieces were created by the Diamond Dogs Tour artist Mark Ravitz. The set, Bowie's most elaborate yet, featured structures such as large columns, overhanging lintels and a giant right hand pointed upwards. Compared to prior tours, Serious Moonlight emphasised lights rather than props. Alomar later told Buckley that it was his favourite Bowie tour, mainly because "it was the first tour where we did all the hits". Discussing the setlist, Pegg states it was "unashamedly a greatest hits package aimed at acquainting the new mass audience with Bowie's back catalogue". Buckley describes the setlist as "relatively mainstream pop-rock", with none of the "quirks" of the late '70s tours. Many of the arrangements were redone with horns to make every song sound fresh.

Serious Moonlight was a massive success: it became the biggest tour of 1983, appeased Bowie's newfound audience and, along with Let's Dance, turned Bowie into a massive superstar. The tour was mostly well-received, although British reviewers tended to be more aggressive than American ones. An accompanying film documenting two shows performed on 11 and 12 September 1983 in Vancouver was released in 1984 as Serious Moonlight. Although immensely successful, Bowie later called the tour a mixed blessing: "I was something I never wanted to be. I was a well-accepted artist. I had started appealing to people who bought Phil Collins albums. [...] I suddenly didn't know my audience and worse, I didn't care about them." Following the tour's conclusion, Bowie found himself in a creative stalemate. Pressure from the label to release a follow-up led him into the studio in the spring of 1984 unprepared. The resulting album, Tonight, is considered one of his creative low-points.

== Subsequent events ==
Let's Dance was nominated for the Grammy Award for Album of the Year at the 26th Annual Grammy Awards in 1984 but lost to Michael Jackson's Thriller (1982). Although Bowie had charged Rodgers with making hits for him, Bowie later said in 1997: "At the time, Let's Dance was not mainstream. It was virtually a new kind of hybrid, using blues-rock guitar against a dance format. There wasn't anything else that really quite sounded like that at the time. So, it only seems commercial in hindsight because it sold so many [copies]. It was great in its way, but it put me in a real corner in that it fucked with my integrity." Two years earlier, he stated he intended for it to be a one-off project only: "I had every intention of continuing to do some unusual material after that. But the success of that record really forced me, in a way, to continue the beast. It was my own doing, of course, but I felt, after a few years, that I had gotten stuck." Visconti stated in 1985 that "it was an album he had to make".

The album's success caused Bowie to hit a creative low point in his career lasting the next few years. By 1987, Bowie began to distance himself from the record, telling one interviewer that it was "more Nile's album than mine", to which Rodgers disagreed in 1998. After his follow-up albums Tonight and Never Let Me Down (1987) were critically dismissed,—Bowie later dismissed this period as his "Phil Collins years"—he formed the rock band Tin Machine in an effort to regain his artistic vision.

== Legacy ==
Professional ratings
Retrospective reviews
Review scores
| Source | Rating |
|---|---|
| AllMusic | 3/5 stars |
| Blender | 4/5 stars |
| Chicago Tribune | 3/4 stars |
| The Encyclopedia of Popular Music | 3/5 stars |
| Pitchfork | 8.4/10 |
| Q | 3/5 stars |
| The Rolling Stone Album Guide | 3.5/5 stars |
| Spin Alternative Record Guide | 6/10 |

In a retrospective review for AllMusic, Stephen Thomas Erlewine felt that the album's three hit singles were catchy yet distinctive pop songs, while the rest of the album was "unremarkable plastic soul" indicative of Bowie "entering a songwriting slump". Power wrote that Bowie "pleaded shamelessly for the love of the mass market" with the album. He continued "... the title track was a decent chunk of funk-rock and Bowie did not embarrass himself on the single 'China Girl'. Otherwise, the record had a great deal in common with Wham! and Phil Collins." Quantick praised the combination of Bowie and Rodgers as "perfect" on the title track, the "sweet, romantic" rendition of "China Girl" and highlighted "Criminal World". He stated "Let's Dance may have had a ground-breaking sound and a popularity that Bowie clearly ached for, but it's often a mundane album, as songs like 'Ricochet' and 'Shake It' mark time". He said the album was "literally the template for 80s Bowie – blond, suited and smiling". Writing in 1995 for the Spin Alternative Record Guide, Rob Sheffield sees the album as exemplifying the influence of the New Romantic movement on Bowie. While lauding "Modern Love", he describes the album's other songs as "dodgier" but "good fun".

In 2014, Andy Greene of Rolling Stone described Let's Dance as "the conclusion of arguably the greatest 14-year run in rock history". Writing for The Guardian the same year, Jeremy Allen stated that the album had "spent time in the wilderness, rejected by many because of its 80s production values", but he added that "a reappraisal was all but inevitable and has coincided with a renaissance in Rodgers' career and an outpouring of love for the unprecedentedly successful producer/guitarist." The chief rock and pop critic of The Guardian, Alexis Petridis, said in his retrospective review of Bowie's career in 2016 that Let's Dance "had its moments", unlike Tonight.

Reflecting on Let's Dance, Pegg agrees with Bowie in that the record was the artist's "least challenging" album up to that point. He felt that unlike Bowie's Glass Spider Tour and Tin Machine periods, where Bowie was willing to take risks and face criticism head-on, Let's Dance plays it safe in every aspect, creating tunes that originally contained "rough edges" that were then "sanded down" and given a "high-gloss finish". Pegg also notes that the appearance of three covers on the record was evident to Bowie hitting a creative slump. Spitz on the other hand, considers Let's Dance to be "as revolutionary" as Ziggy Stardust, Station to Station or Low. He finds it unfair to call it Bowie's "sellout record", saying it is "every bit as high concept as his canonised seventies efforts". Although he finds the record's first four tracks among the strongest of Bowie's entire career, Perone describes Let's Dance as a "double-edged sword", in that it was commercially successful but artistically, it found Bowie exploring more conventional lyrical themes and accessible music that hindered his next recordings.

On the album's influence, Billboard's Joe Lynch argued that Let's Dance provided "the template" for alternative dance music "for the next 30 years". In 1989, the album was ranked number 83 on Rolling Stone's list of the "100 Best Albums of the Eighties". In 2013, NME ranked Let's Dance at number 296 in its list of the 500 Greatest Albums of All Time. It was voted number 796 in the second edition of Colin Larkin's All Time Top 1000 Albums. In 2018, Pitchfork ranked the album at number 127 in their list of "The 200 Best Albums of the 1980s"; Jeremy D. Larson wrote that Let's Dance "sounds anything but dated" and felt it "became a Trojan horse for the world to discover all the many Bowies hiding underneath the blond bouffant and designer suits."

== Reissues ==
In 1995, Virgin Records rereleased the album on CD with "Under Pressure" as a bonus track. EMI did the second rerelease in 1999 (featuring 24-bit digitally remastered sound and no bonus tracks), followed by another in 2003 as a hybrid stereo SACD/PCM CD.

In 2018, Let's Dance was remastered for the Loving the Alien (1983–1988) box set released by Parlophone. It was released in CD, vinyl and digital formats, as part of this compilation and then separately the following year.

== Track listing ==
All tracks are written by David Bowie, except where noted

Side one
| No. | Title | Lyrics | Music | Length |
|---|---|---|---|---|
| 1. | "Modern Love" | | | 4:46 |
| 2. | "China Girl" | Iggy Pop | Bowie, Pop | 5:32 |
| 3. | "Let's Dance" | | | 7:38 |
| 4. | "Without You" | | | 3:08 |

Side two
| No. | Title | Lyrics | Music | Length |
|---|---|---|---|---|
| 1. | "Ricochet" | | | 5:14 |
| 2. | "Criminal World" | Peter Godwin, Duncan Browne, Sean Lyons, adapt. Bowie | Godwin, Browne, Lyons | 4:25 |
| 3. | "Cat People (Putting Out Fire)" | | Giorgio Moroder | 5:09 |
| 4. | "Shake It" | | | 3:49 |
| Total length: | | | | 39:42 |

== Personnel ==
Credits are adapted from the album's liner notes.

- David Bowie – lead vocals; producer; engineer; assistant mixing; horn arrangements
- Nile Rodgers – guitar; producer; engineer; assistant mixing; horn arrangements

Musicians

- Stevie Ray Vaughan – lead guitar
- Carmine Rojas – bass guitar
- Bernard Edwards – bass guitar on "Without You"
- Omar Hakim, Tony Thompson – drums
- Sammy Figueroa – percussion
- Robert Sabino – keyboards, piano
- Stan Harrison – tenor saxophone; flute
- Robert Aaron – tenor saxophone
- Steve Elson – baritone saxophone; flute
- Mac Gollehon – trumpet
- Frank Simms, George Simms, David Spinner – backing vocals

Production

- Bob Clearmountain (Fast Forward Productions) – engineer; mixing
- Dave Greenberg – assistant engineer
- Bob Ludwig (Masterdisk) – mastering

Visuals

- Greg Gorman – photography
- Mick Haggerty – package design
- Derek Boshier – cover painting

== Charts ==
=== Weekly charts ===
1983–1984 weekly chart performance for Let's Dance
| Chart (1983–1984) | Peak position |
|---|---|
| Australian Albums (Kent Music Report) | 1 |
| Austrian Albums (Ö3 Austria) | 2 |
| Canada Top Albums/CDs (RPM) | 1 |
| Danish Albums (IFPI) | 1 |
| Dutch Albums (Album Top 100) | 1 |
| Finnish Albums (Suomen virallinen lista) | 1 |
| French Albums (SNEP) | 1 |
| German Albums (Offizielle Top 100) | 2 |
| Iceland Albums (Íslenski Listinn) | 1 |
| Italian Albums (Musica e dischi) | 5 |
| Israeli Albums (Kol Yisrael) | 3 |
| Japanese Albums (Oricon) | 6 |
| New Zealand Albums (RMNZ) | 1 |
| Norwegian Albums (VG-lista) | 1 |
| Spanish Albums (AFYVE) | 3 |
| Swedish Albums (Sverigetopplistan) | 1 |
| Swiss Albums (Schweizer Hitparade) | 17 |
| UK Albums (Official Charts) | 1 |
| US Billboard Top LPs & Tape | 4 |
| US Rock Albums (Billboard) | 3 |
| US Top R&B/Hip-Hop Albums (Billboard) | 21 |

2016 weekly chart performance for Let's Dance
| Chart (2016) | Peak position |
|---|---|
| Australian Albums (ARIA) | 37 |
| Canadian Albums (Billboard) | 57 |
| French Albums (SNEP) | 60 |
| Irish Albums (IRMA) | 94 |
| Italian Albums (FIMI) | 78 |

2019 weekly chart performance for Let's Dance
| Chart (2019) | Peak position |
|---|---|
| Hungarian Albums (MAHASZ) | 15 |

2020 weekly chart performance for Let's Dance
| Chart (2020) | Peak position |
|---|---|
| Scottish Albums (Official Charts) | 9 |

2026 weekly chart performance for Let's Dance
| Chart (2026) | Peak position |
|---|---|
| Greek Albums (IFPI) | 74 |

=== Year-end charts ===
1983 year-end chart performance for Let's Dance
| Chart (1983) | Position |
|---|---|
| Australian Albums (Kent Music Report) | 4 |
| Austrian Albums (Ö3 Austria) | 9 |
| Canada Top Albums/CDs (RPM) | 2 |
| Dutch Albums (Album Top 100) | 3 |
| French Albums (SNEP) | 8 |
| German Albums (Offizelle Top 100) | 5 |
| Japanese Albums (Oricon) | 22 |
| New Zealand Albums (RMNZ) | 1 |
| UK Albums (Gallup) | 4 |
| US Billboard Pop Albums | 28 |

1984 year-end chart performance for Let's Dance
| Chart (1984) | Position |
|---|---|
| Australian Albums (Kent Music Report) | 72 |
| Canada Top Albums/CDs (RPM) | 69 |
| US Billboard Pop Albums | 64 |

== Sales and certifications ==
Sales and certifications for Let's Dance
| Region | Certification | Certified units/sales |
|---|---|---|
| Australia (ARIA) | Platinum | 50,000^{^} |
| Austria (IFPI Austria) | Gold | 25,000^{*} |
| Canada (Music Canada) | 5× Platinum | 500,000^{^} |
| Denmark (IFPI Danmark) | Gold | 50,000^{^} |
| Finland (Musiikkituottajat) | Gold | 45,201 |
| France (SNEP) | Platinum | 400,000^{*} |
| Germany | — | 350,000 |
| Japan (Oricon Charts) | — | 302,500 |
| Netherlands (NVPI) | Platinum | 100,000^{^} |
| New Zealand (RMNZ) | Platinum | 15,000^{^} |
| Spain (Promusicae) | Gold | 50,000^{^} |
| Sweden | — | 75,000 |
| United Kingdom (BPI) | Platinum | 300,000^{^} |
| United Kingdom (BPI) 1999 release | Silver | 147,655 |
| United States (RIAA) | Platinum | 2,000,000 |
| Yugoslavia | — | 49,209 |
Summaries
| Worldwide | — | 10,700,000 |
^{*} Sales figures based on certification alone.^{^} Shipments figures based on certification alone.
