= Modern Love (David Bowie song) =

1983 song by David Bowie

Single by David Bowie

from the album Let's Dance
- B-side: "Modern Love (Live)"
- Released: 12 September 1983
- Recorded: December 1982
- Studio: Power Station, New York City
- Genre: Rock; dance-rock; new wave; soul; pop
- Length: 4:46 (album version); 3:56 (single version)
- Label: EMI America
- Songwriter: David Bowie
- Producers: David Bowie; Nile Rodgers

David Bowie singles chronology
"China Girl" (1983)	"Modern Love" (1983)	"Without You" (1983)

Music video
- "Modern Love" on YouTube

"Modern Love" is a song written by the English singer-songwriter David Bowie. It was released as the opening track on his 1983 album Let's Dance and issued as the third single from the album later in the year. Co-produced by Bowie and Nile Rodgers, it is a rock song that contains elements of new wave music. It was recorded at the Power Station in Manhattan and was one of the first tracks recorded for the album. It was performed by Bowie on the Serious Moonlight Tour, where it often closed the shows. A music video for the song, directed by Jim Yukich and featuring a performance of the song during the tour, was released in 1983 and played frequently on MTV.

Since its release, "Modern Love" has received critical acclaim from music critics, who praised Bowie's songwriting, its production, and its power as an opening track. It is generally considered one of the best songs on Let's Dance, along with "China Girl" and the title track, and has since been called one of Bowie's greatest songs. The single release was a commercial success, peaking at number two on the UK Singles Chart and number 14 on the US Billboard Hot 100. "Modern Love" has appeared on various compilation albums and was remastered for the 2018 box set Loving the Alien (1983–1988).

== Background and composition ==
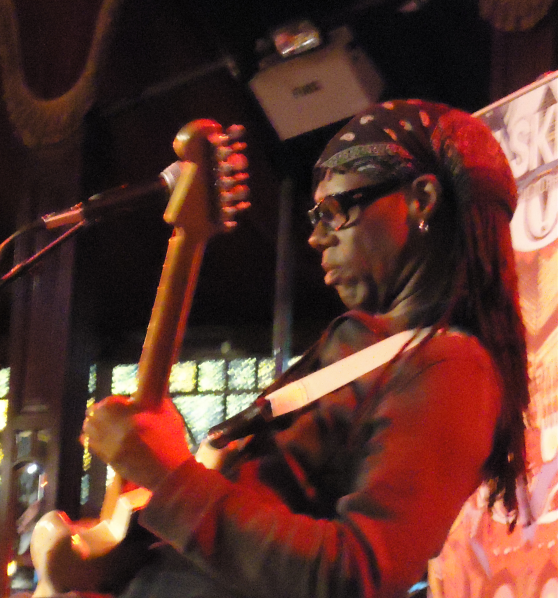
Nile Rodgers co-produced the song.

After "Let's Dance", "Modern Love" was the second song Bowie recorded in December 1982 at the Power Station in Manhattan, New York City. It was co-produced by Nile Rodgers of the American disco band Chic, who had originally hoped to make a "very noncommercial, avant-garde album" with Bowie. Following the recording of the title track and "Modern Love", however, Bowie asked Rodgers to "make [a] great commercial record...". They finished recording the album in 19 days. Rodgers described the track as "an old barrelhouse rocker with a real pounding Little Richard-type piano, while on top it has a very sophisticated jazz horn sound"; he would later call the track one of his favourites. Bowie said Little Richard, his "earliest rock hero", was an inspiration for songs like "Modern Love", specifically the call-and-response sections. Like the rest of Let's Dance, the song features guitar by then-rising blues guitarist Stevie Ray Vaughan. The song also features a boogie-woogie piano by Robert Sabino that is almost buried in the mix according to author Nicholas Pegg.

"Modern Love" is a rock song that has elements of new wave and soul music and features a "chukka-chukka" rhythm that's "at once funky and strange", followed by a "soothing" electronic riff. According to biographer Marc Spitz, the song is "the sound of someone who's been away, reflecting some [in the lyrics] 'It's not really work / It's just the power to charm'." Spitz continues, "the new times terrify him some but he's going to use the fear and stay positive". Pegg writes that lyrically, "[the song] establishes the album's recurring theme of conflict between 'God and Man' in a secular world". The song's spoken intro parallels the closing mantra of "Ashes to Ashes", specifically the lyrics "get things done".

== Release ==
"Modern Love" was released on 14 April 1983 as the opening track of Let's Dance. It was later released on 12 September 1983 by EMI America on seven-inch vinyl (as EA 158, featuring the shortened single version), and on twelve-inch vinyl (as 12EA 158, featuring the full length song) as the third single of the album, with a live version, recorded in Montreal in July 1983, as its B-side. The single reached number two on the UK Singles Chart and number 14 on the US Billboard Hot 100. By the time "Modern Love" was issued as a single, Bowie's Serious Moonlight Tour was underway.

The song was a staple of the tour, where it closed the show on most nights, allowing Bowie to "wave bye-bye" to the crowd per the lyrics. It was featured during Bowie's set at Live Aid in 1985 and in his subsequent Glass Spider and Sound+Vision tours of 1987 and 1990, respectively. He performed it occasionally during his 2003–04 A Reality Tour. To promote the Glass Spider Tour, Bowie re-recorded the song with Tina Turner for a commercial as part of his commitment to Pepsi for their sponsorship; the commercial aired briefly in 1987.

=== Music video ===
The song's music video used footage of Bowie and his band performing the song during a concert on the Serious Moonlight Tour. It was directed by Jim Yukich who, according to Kyle Ryan of The A.V. Club, "captured what looks like Bowie and his band re-emerging for an encore during a four-night stand at Philadelphia's Spectrum theater. The look of Bowie and band presages the swing revival that would follow a decade later." Ryan writes: "As a video, 'Modern Love' is as straightforward as it gets, especially compared to the others Bowie did that year, 'China Girl' and 'Let's Dance'."

== Reception ==
Since its release, "Modern Love" has received acclaim from music critics, who praised Bowie's songwriting, its production and its power as an opening track. In a positive review of Let's Dance at the time of its release, Ken Tucker of Rolling Stone wrote that the album as a whole was "thin and niggling", but enjoyed "Modern Love", "Without You" and "Shake It", calling them "three pristine lovelies". He continued:

This trio of songs offers some of the most daring songwriting of Bowie's career. The lyrics are so simple they risk simple-mindedness, yet I'd give a hundred 'Space Oddity's for the elegant cliché twisting at the climax of 'Modern Love': 'Modern love gets me to the church on time/Church-on-time terrifies me.' As a rock statement about growing up and facing commitments, that couplet beats the hell out of Jackson Browne.

Tony Visconti, Bowie's longtime producer, considers the song one of the album's best. In a review of Let's Dance, which Robert Christgau found "perfunctory" and mused "whether Bowie-the-thespian really cares much about pop music these days", he felt that "Modern Love" was the album's "only interesting new song".

In his retrospective review of the Let's Dance album, Stephen Thomas Erlewine of AllMusic praised the song as an opening track, writing, “[the album] comes tearing out of the gate, propulsed [sic] by the skittering 'Modern Love'." He calls it, along with "China Girl" and the title track, a "catchy, accessible song that has just enough of an alien edge to make [it] distinctive". Rolling Stone's Andy Greene agreed, describing the three tracks as a "triple shot". AllMusic writer Dave Thompson described the song as a "high-energy, effervescent rocker", writing, "it epitomizes all that was good about Bowie's 1983 reinvention as a willing superstar." While he believed that the song's production had started to sound dated in subsequent decades, it is "nevertheless a furiously punchy number, redolent of an old-time rocker". Ryan wrote “'Modern Love' is basically one long hook, which perhaps obscures the anxiety about faith — in both the almighty and relationships — at the song's core. Few pop songs can pull off sing-alongs to the lyrics 'God and man, no religion'." Ryan concluded his review saying, "[the song] sounds both modern and timeless." Pegg deemed it energetic, "brilliantly performed" and "undeniably catchy" but criticised it for being "depressingly superficial" compared with Bowie's previous work.

== Legacy ==
"Modern Love" has appeared on numerous compilation albums, the first being Changesbowie in 1990. The song was remastered, along with the entire Let's Dance album, for the 2018 box set Loving the Alien (1983–1988); the shorter single version and live versions recorded in 1983 and 1987 are also included. Biffy Clyro covered "Modern Love" in February 2018 for The Howard Stern Tribute to David Bowie, which was hosted by Tony Visconti.

Following Bowie's death in 2016, "Modern Love" was named as one of Bowie's greatest songs by numerous publications. Rolling Stone listed it as one of Bowie's 30 essential songs, writing "[the song] reveals Bowie at his catchiest and most nihilistic." Ultimate Classic Rock, in their list of Bowie's 10 greatest songs, listed it at number eight, labeling it the best "pop song" of Bowie's career, praising its spoken intro and its "infectious chorus". The publication also named it the artist's 13th best single. In 2018, the writers of NME listed "Modern Love" as Bowie's eighth greatest song. They noted the "tragic irony" to the track in that it is not about how Bowie managed to "make a perfect song about his cynicism at the world" but rather that his "prescient observations" of the 1980s music industry exposed the "hollowness" of his 1980s works.

== Personnel ==
According to biographer Chris O'Leary:

- David Bowie – vocals
- Stevie Ray Vaughan – guitar
- Nile Rodgers – rhythm guitar
- Carmine Rojas – bass guitar
- Omar Hakim – drums
- Robert Sabino – keyboards; piano
- Mac Gollehon – trumpet
- Robert Aaron – tenor saxophone
- Stan Harrison – tenor saxophone
- Steve Elson – baritone saxophone
- Sam Figueroa – percussion
- David Spinner – backing vocals
- George Simms – backing vocals
- Frank Simms – backing vocals

Production

- David Bowie – producer
- Nile Rodgers – producer

== Charts ==
=== Weekly charts ===
Chart (1983–2016)	Peak position
Australia (Kent Music Report)	6
Belgium (Ultratop 50 Flanders)	3
Belgium (VRT Top 30 Flanders)	3
Canada (RPM 50 Singles)	2
France (SNEP)	26
Ireland (IRMA)	3
Israel (Media Forest)	1
Luxembourg (Radio Luxembourg)	1
Netherlands (Dutch Top 40)	9
Netherlands (Single Top 100)	10
New Zealand (Recorded Music NZ)	6
Switzerland (Schweizer Hitparade)	17
UK Singles (Official Charts)	2
US Billboard Hot 100	14
US Billboard Hot Mainstream Rock Tracks	6
US Cash Box Top 100	15
West Germany (GfK)	27

=== Year-end charts ===
Chart (1983)	Position
Australia (Kent Music Report)	44
Canada (RPM)	24
New Zealand (RMNZ)	48
UK Singles (OCC)	45
US Cash Box Top 100	97

== Certifications ==
Region	Certification	Certified units/sales
Canada (Music Canada)	Gold	50,000^{^}
France (SNEP) 2018 remaster	Gold	100,000^{‡}
New Zealand (RMNZ)	Platinum	30,000^{‡}
United Kingdom (BPI)	Platinum	600,000^{‡}
^{^} Shipments figures based on certification alone.^{‡} Sales+streaming figures based on certification alone.
