= Serious Moonlight (1983 film) =

Video by David Bowie
- Released: 1984
- Recorded: 12 September 1983
- Genre: Rock

David Bowie chronology
Love You till Tuesday (1984)	Serious Moonlight (1984)	Ziggy Stardust and the Spiders from Mars: The Motion Picture (1984)

Serious Moonlight is a concert video by the English singer-songwriter David Bowie. Filmed in Vancouver on 12 September 1983, on the singer's "Serious Moonlight Tour", the video was released on VHS and laserdisc in 1984 and on DVD in 2006. The concert includes most of the songs from the concert although "Star", "Stay", "The Jean Genie", "Red Sails" and "Modern Love" were left off the 1984 release due to time constraints; the songs were not reinstated for the 2006 DVD release.

A live version (audio only) of "Modern Love", recorded on 13 July 1983 at a show in Montreal and originally released as the B-side to the studio version of the same song, can be found elsewhere on the 2006 DVD release as background music for the photo gallery.

The audio and exact setlist from the concert film was reused for the Serious Moonlight (Live '83) live album, included with the Loving the Alien (1983–1988) box set in 2018 and released separately the following year; the live album additionally includes the aforementioned live recording of "Modern Love" as the final track.

== Track listing ==
All songs were written by David Bowie, except where noted.

=== Film Tracklisting ===
No.	Title	Original album	Length
1.	"Introduction"
2.	"Look Back in Anger" (Bowie, Brian Eno)	Lodger
3.	""Heroes"" (Bowie, Eno)	"Heroes"
4.	"What in the World"	Low
5.	"Golden Years"	Station to Station
6.	"Fashion"	Scary Monsters (And Super Creeps)
7.	"Let's Dance"	Let's Dance
8.	"Breaking Glass" (Bowie, Dennis Davis, George Murray)	Low
9.	"Life on Mars?"	Hunky Dory
10.	"Sorrow" (Feldman, Goldstein, Gottehrer)	Pin Ups
11.	"Cat People (Putting Out Fire)" (Bowie, Giorgio Moroder)	Let's Dance
12.	"China Girl" (Bowie, Iggy Pop)	Let's Dance
13.	"Scary Monsters (and Super Creeps)"	Scary Monsters (and Super Creeps)
14.	"Rebel Rebel"	Diamond Dogs
15.	"White Light/White Heat" (Lou Reed)	White Light/White Heat
16.	"Station to Station"	Station to Station
17.	"Cracked Actor"	Aladdin Sane
18.	"Ashes to Ashes"	Scary Monsters (and Super Creeps)
19.	"Space Oddity/Band introduction"	David Bowie
20.	"Young Americans"	Young Americans
21.	"Fame/End Credits" (Bowie, John Lennon, Carlos Alomar)	Young Americans

=== Album Tracklisting ===
Disc one
No.	Title	Length
1.	"Look Back in Anger"	3:07
2.	""Heroes""	4:53
3.	"What In The World"	3:44
4.	"Golden Years"	3:31
5.	"Fashion"	2:43
6.	"Let's Dance"	4:34
7.	"Breaking Glass"	3:00
8.	"Life on Mars?"	4:07
9.	"Sorrow"	2:49
10.	"Cat People (Putting Out Fire)"	4:20
11.	"China Girl"	5:27
12.	"Scary Monsters (And Super Creeps)"	3:42
13.	"Rebel Rebel"	2:24
Total length:		48:26

Disc two
No.	Title	Length
1.	"White Light/White Heat"	5:36
2.	"Station To Station"	8:58
3.	"Cracked Actor"	3:58
4.	"Ashes to Ashes"	3:51
5.	"Space Oddity/Band Introduction"	6:32
6.	"Young Americans"	5:25
7.	"Fame"	5:36
8.	"Modern Love"	3:54
Total length:		43:53 (92:19)

== Charts ==
=== Album charts ===
Chart (2019)	Peak position
Hungarian Albums (MAHASZ)	36

=== Video charts ===
Chart (1984)	Peak position
US Top Music Video (Billboard)	10
US Top VHS Sales (Billboard)	13

== Ricochet (2006 DVD extra) ==
The 2006 DVD release of Serious Moonlight also contains, as an extra, the 1984 documentary/ concert film Ricochet, chronicling Bowie's experiences in Hong Kong, Singapore, and Bangkok on the Asian leg of the Serious Moonlight tour. Ricochet was previously released to home video in the mid-1980s in a shorter version, separately from the Serious Moonlight video.
