= Serious Moonlight Tour =

1983 concert tour by David Bowie

- Tour by David Bowie
- The Serious Moonlight Tour promotional poster
- Location: Europe; North America; Asia; Oceania
- Associated album: Let's Dance
- Start date: 18 May 1983
- End date: 8 December 1983
- Legs: 8
- No. of shows: 96

David Bowie concert chronology
- Isolar II – The 1978 World Tour (1978); Serious Moonlight Tour (1983); The Glass Spider Tour (1987)

The Serious Moonlight Tour was a worldwide concert tour by the English musician David Bowie, launched in May 1983 in support of his album Let's Dance (1983). The tour opened at the Vorst Forest Nationaal, Brussels, on 18 May 1983 and ended in the Hong Kong Coliseum on 8 December 1983; 15 countries visited, 96 performances, and over 2.6 million tickets sold. It was the biggest tour of the year 1983. The tour garnered mostly favourable reviews from the press. It was, at the time, his longest, largest and most successful concert tour to date, although it has since been surpassed in length, attendance and gross revenue by subsequent Bowie tours.

== Background and development ==
In 1980, David Bowie had released his album Scary Monsters (and Super Creeps), at the time expecting to support the album with a tour. However, the murder of John Lennon in December 1980 deeply affected Bowie (Note: Bowie and Lennon became friends in the mid-1970s and collaborated with each other for "Fame" and a cover of Lennon's Beatles song "Across the Universe", both released on Bowie's 1975 album Young Americans) and as a result, he cancelled his tour plans and withdrew to his home in Switzerland where he became a recluse and continued working. Consequently, the Serious Moonlight Tour was Bowie's first tour in 5 years.

This tour, designed to support Bowie's latest album Let's Dance, was initially designed to be a smaller tour, playing to the likes of sub-10,000-seat indoor venues around the world, similar to previous Bowie tours. However, the success of Let's Dance caused unexpectedly high demand for tickets: there were 250,000 requests for 44,000 tickets at one show, for example, and as a result the tour was changed to instead play in a variety of larger outdoor and festival-style venues. While reviewing the album the week following its release, the Billboard Magazine stated that "Bowie's first tour in five years would only enhance sales fire".

The largest crowd for a single show during the tour was 80,000 in Auckland, New Zealand, while the largest crowd for a festival date was 300,000 at the US 83 Festival in California. The tour sold out at every venue it played.

Bowie used boxing (of which he was a fan) to get in shape for the tour. His son Duncan Jones pointed out years later that "Each round [of boxing] is approximately the same length as a song, so if you can get your cardio up enough to do a full 12 or so rounds, you’re ready to go!"

== Set design ==
Initially, Bowie worked with Derek Boshier to design the stage for the tour, as Boshier had designed the artwork for the Let's Dance album itself. The design proposed by Boshier was an "extravagant design reminiscent of the Diamond Dogs set with multiple platforms and levels, rotating prisms revealing different backdrop designs on each facet, and a gigantic cartoon figure of Bowie with a guitar", but this was rejected as too expensive, so instead Bowie worked with Mark Ravitz to come up with what was the final design, which included four giant columns (affectionately referred to as "condoms") as well as a large moon and a giant hand. Ravitz had designed the set for Bowie's 1974 Diamond Dogs Tour, and would work on Bowie's next touring set as well, the 1987 Glass Spider Tour.

The Serious Moonlight stage was deliberately given a vertical feeling (especially due to the columns) and an overall design that Bowie called a combination of classicism and modernism. The weight of one set (of which there were two) was 32 tons. Lighting the set were 40 Vari-Lites, some of which were set horizontally across the stage, which allowed them to "create set-piece landscapes" for certain songs.

== Tour rehearsals and musicians ==
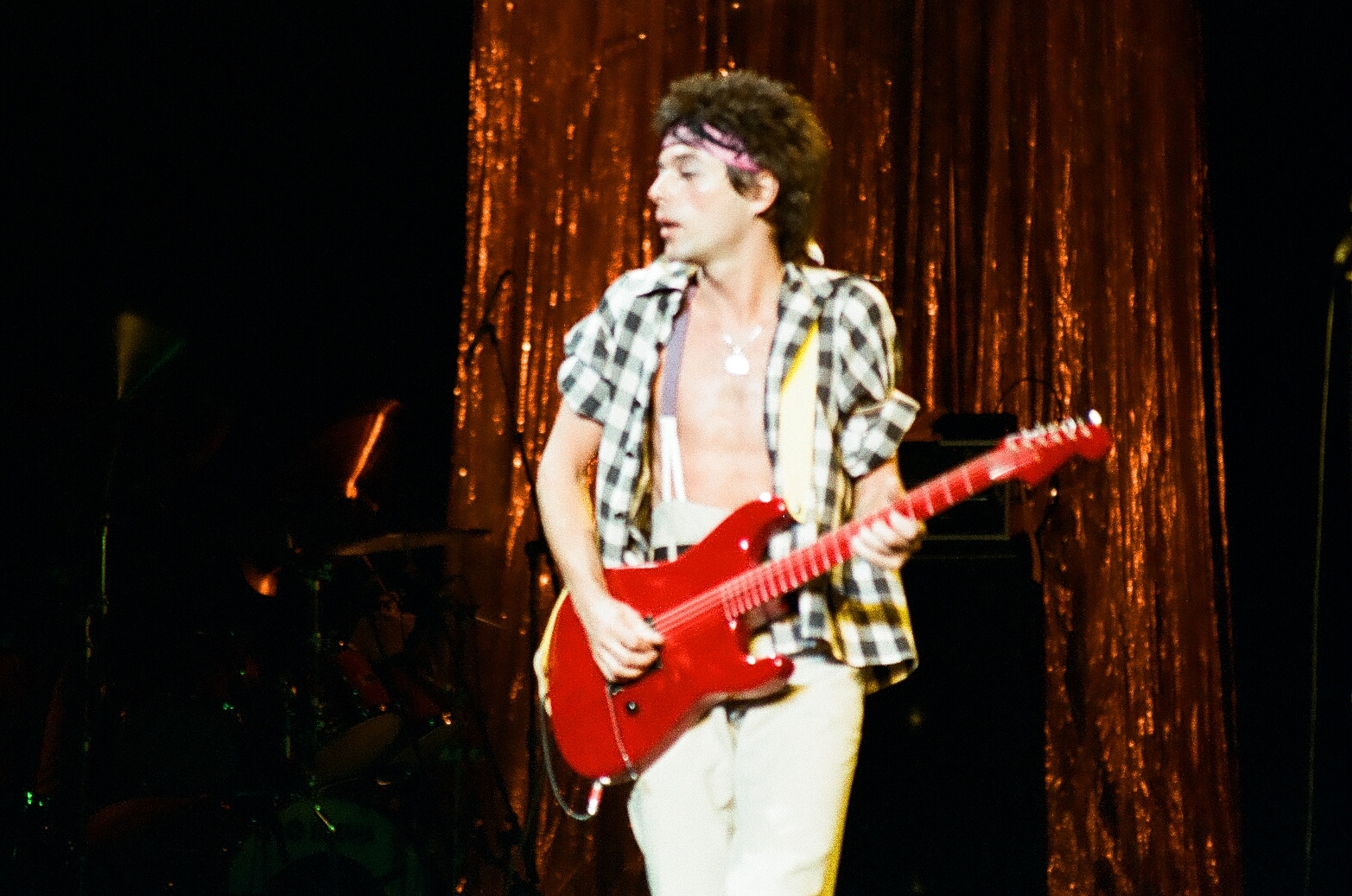
Earl Slick performing in November 1983 during the Serious Moonlight Tour

Bowie used the musicians he'd newly collaborated with on Let's Dance, along with some longer standing collaborators, including Carlos Alomar who was the designated tour band leader. Stevie Ray Vaughan, who had contributed guitar solos to six of the songs on Let's Dance and who was up and coming, was to join the tour, also to please the American audience. Early rehearsals were held in Manhattan without Vaughan and Bowie, and were overseen by Alomar. Rehearsals moved to Las Calinas, Texas in April, where Bowie and Vaughan joined the band, but Vaughan showed up with a cocaine habit, a hard-partying wife and an entourage looking for easy access to drugs. Given that Bowie himself had moved to Berlin in the late 1970s to try and kick his own cocaine habit, Bowie and Vaughan's management failed to come to an agreement on how to temper the situation, and in the end Vaughan pulled out of the tour. Bassist Carmine Rojas called Vaughan's release "one of the most heartbreaking moments he had ever witnessed on the road, Stevie left standing on the sidewalk with his bags surrounding him." Bowie, who was in Europe promoting the album and tour when the disagreement arose, did not have a say in Vaughan's departure. This happened less than one week before the tour's opening night, and as a result, Vaughan's replacement Earl Slick spent the next few days in his hotel room, learning all of the 31 songs on the setlist.

Each band member wore a costume which was designed "down to the smallest detail", as if a character in a play. Two sets of each person's costumes were made and worn on alternate nights, and everyone got to keep one set at the conclusion of the tour as a souvenir. The bands' costumes were a nod, a "slight parody", on all the New Romantic bands that were growing in popularity at the time.

== Song selection ==
Faced with high demand for tickets for the tour, Bowie decided to play his more recognizable songs from his repertoire, saying a few years later that his goal was to give the fans the songs that they'd heard on the radio over the past 15 years, calling the setlist a collection of songs that the fans "probably didn't realize when added up are a great body of work". Bowie and Carlos Alomar selected an initial list of songs for the tour, 35 of which they rehearsed for the tour. One song that was on the rehearsal's song list that never actually got to the rehearsal stage was "Across the Universe", which Bowie had covered in 1975 on his Young Americans album. The setlist for the tour was the basis for the track list for the 1989 box set Sound + Vision. Some of Bowie's less well-known songs, such as "Joe the Lion" and "Wild Is the Wind" were performed only on early dates of the tour.

== Tour performances ==
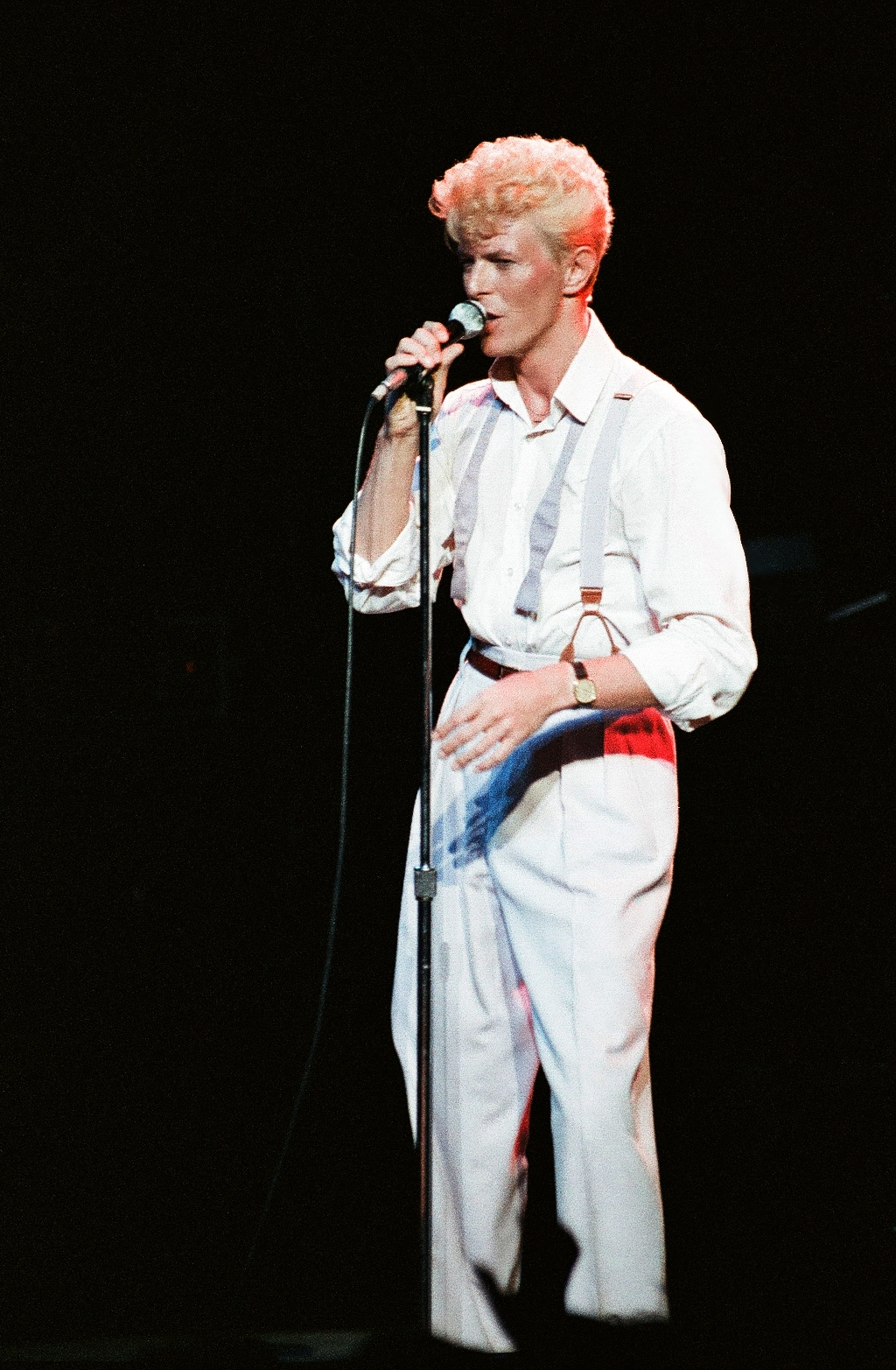
David Bowie on stage during the 1983 tour

Various artists opened for Bowie across different legs, including UB40, Icehouse, The Tubes, The Beat and Peter Gabriel. To counteract counterfeiting, tickets and backstage passes were printed with small flaws that casual observers would not notice, but tour staff and security were trained to spot.

On 30 June 1983, the performance at the Hammersmith Odeon in London was a charity show for the Brixton Neighbourhood Community Association in the presence of Princess Michael of Kent. The show raised nearly £100,000 for charity (about £320,000 in today's currency), and was performed without the standard set. The 13 July 1983 Montreal Forum performance was recorded and broadcast on American FM radio and other radio stations worldwide, and it was from this concert that the live version of "Modern Love" was recorded. The concert on 12 September in Vancouver was recorded for the concert video Serious Moonlight, that was released in 1984 and on DVD in 2006. There were discussions to release a live CD from these performances as well, but that idea was later discarded.

At the Canadian National Exhibition Stadium performance on 4 September 1983 in Toronto, Bowie introduced special guest Mick Ronson, who borrowed Slick's guitar and performed "The Jean Genie" with Bowie and band. Ronson had only been asked to play the day before when he had been backstage at the previous night's show, and he later recalled:

I was playing Slick's guitar ... I had heard Slick play solos all night so I decided not to play solos and I just went out and thrashed the guitar. I really thrashed the guitar, I was waving the guitar above my head and all sorts of things. It was funny afterwards because David said, 'You should have seen [Earl Slick's] face...' meaning he looked petrified. I had his prize guitar and I was swinging it around my head and Slick's going 'Waaaa... watch my guitar', you know. I was banging into it and it was going round my head. Poor Slick. I mean, I didn't know it was his special guitar, I just thought it was a guitar, a lump of wood with six strings.

The last show of the tour, on 8 December 1983, was the third anniversary of John Lennon's death, whom Bowie and Slick had previously worked with in the studio. Slick suggested to Bowie a few days prior to the show that they play "Across the Universe" as a tribute; but Bowie said, "Well if we're going to do it, we might as well do 'Imagine'." They rehearsed the song a couple of times on 5 December (in Bangkok) and then performed the song on the final night of the tour as a tribute to their friend.

== Legacy ==
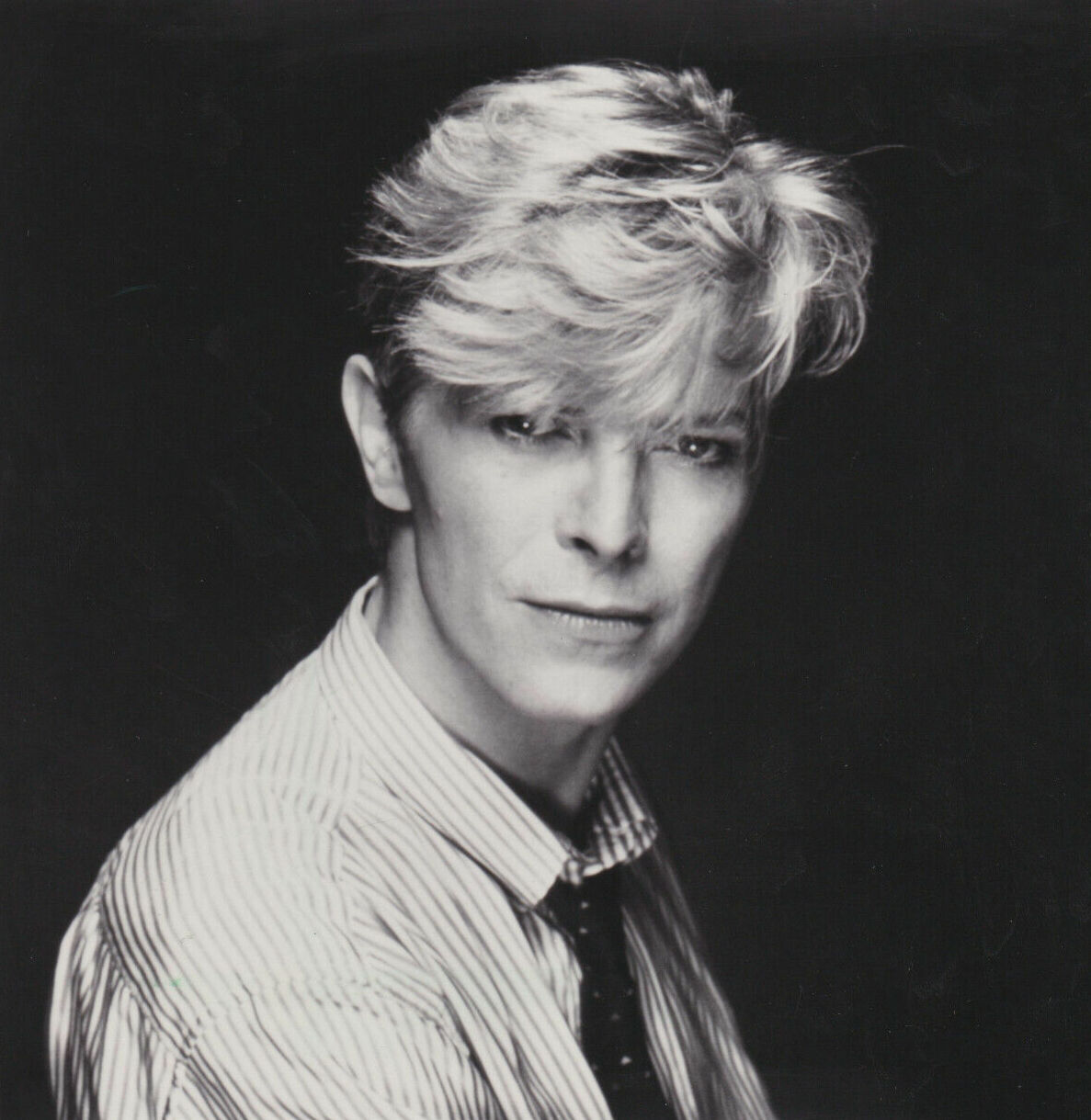
David Bowie in a 1983 promotional picture

The tour was a commercial high point for Bowie, who found his new popularity perplexing. He later remarked that, with the success of Let's Dance and the Serious Moonlight Tour, he lost track of who his fans were or what they wanted. One critic would later call this tour his "most accessible" because "it had few props and one costume change, from peach suit to blue."

"The 'Blond Ambition' tour, as we ended up calling it, in 1984 [sic] was pretty good," Bowie conceded in 2003. "We'd booked it before everything went huge and it really was quite innovative. It was the first big theatrical-show-type tour there had been. Madonna and Prince came to see it and it had an influence."

The 26 November show in Auckland became – at the time – the most attended concert in the Southern Hemisphere with over 80,000 people in attendance.

Bowie specifically tried to avoid repeating the Serious Moonlight Tour's successful formula for his 1987 Glass Spider Tour.

== Set list ==
This is the set list from the performance in Vancouver, Canada, on 12 September 1983. It's not intended to represent all shows throughout the tour.

1. "Look Back in Anger"
2. "'Heroes'"
3. "Golden Years"
4. "Fashion"
5. "Let's Dance"
6. "Breaking Glass"
7. "Life on Mars?"
8. "Sorrow"
9. "Cat People (Putting Out Fire)"
10. "China Girl"
11. "Scary Monsters (And Super Creeps)"
12. "Rebel Rebel"
13. "White Light/White Heat"
14. "Station to Station"
15. "Cracked Actor"
16. "Ashes to Ashes"
17. "Space Oddity"
18. "Young Americans"
19. "Fame"

Encore

20. "Star"
21. "Stay"
22. "The Jean Genie"
23. "Modern Love"

== Personnel ==
Personnel adapted from The Complete David Bowie.

- David Bowie – lead vocals, guitar, saxophone
- Earl Slick – guitar
- Carlos Alomar – guitar, backing vocals, music director
- Carmine Rojas – bass guitar
- Tony Thompson – drums, percussion
- Dave Lebolt – keyboards, synthesizers
- Steve Elson – saxophones
- Stan Harrison – saxophones, woodwinds
- Lenny Pickett – saxophones, woodwinds
- George Simms – backing vocals
- Frank Simms – backing vocals

== Tour dates ==
Date	City	Country	Venue	Attendance (approx)
Europe
18 May 1983	Brussels	Belgium	Vorst Forest Nationaal	
19 May 1983	Brussels	Belgium	Vorst Forest Nationaal	
20 May 1983	Frankfurt	West Germany	Festhalle	
21 May 1983	Munich	West Germany	Olympiahalle	
22 May 1983	Munich	West Germany	Olympiahalle	
24 May 1983	Lyon	France	Palais des Sports de Gerland	23,615
25 May 1983	Lyon	France	Palais des Sports de Gerland	23,615
26 May 1983	Fréjus	France	Les Arènes	28,937
27 May 1983	Fréjus	France	Les Arènes	28,937
29 May 1983	Nantes	France	(Cancelled) Le Beaujoire	
North America
30 May 1983	San Bernardino	United States	US Festival; Glen Helen Regional Park	300,000
Europe
2 June 1983	London	England	Wembley Arena	23,162-27,000
3 June 1983	London	England	Wembley Arena	23,162-27,000
4 June 1983	London	England	Wembley Arena	23,162-27,000
5 June 1983	Birmingham	England	National Exhibition Centre	22,000
6 June 1983	Birmingham	England	National Exhibition Centre	22,000
8 June 1983	Paris	France	Hippodrome D'Auteuil	120,000
9 June 1983	Paris	France	Hippodrome D'Auteuil	120,000
11 June 1983	Gothenburg	Sweden	Ullevi Stadium	101,000
12 June 1983	Gothenburg	Sweden	Ullevi Stadium	101,000
15 June 1983	Bochum	West Germany	Ruhrstadion	33,843
17 June 1983	Bad Segeberg	West Germany	Freilichtbühne	24,150
18 June 1983	Bad Segeberg	West Germany	Freilichtbühne	24,150
20 June 1983	West Berlin	West Germany	Waldbühne	22,245
24 June 1983	Offenbach am Main	West Germany	Bieberer Berg Stadion	24,720
25 June 1983	Rotterdam	Netherlands	Stadion Feijenoord	101,311
26 June 1983	Rotterdam	Netherlands	Stadion Feijenoord	101,311
28 June 1983	Edinburgh	Scotland	Murrayfield Stadium	47,444
30 June 1983	London	England	Hammersmith Odeon	2,120
1 July 1983	Milton Keynes	England	Milton Keynes Bowl	174,984 (over all 3 nights)
2 July 1983	Milton Keynes	England	Milton Keynes Bowl	174,984 (over all 3 nights)
3 July 1983	Milton Keynes	England	Milton Keynes Bowl	174,984 (over all 3 nights)
North America
11 July 1983	Quebec City	Canada	Colisée de Québec	14,400
12 July 1983	Montreal	Canada	Montreal Forum	32,547
13 July 1983	Montreal	Canada	Montreal Forum	32,547
15 July 1983	Hartford	United States	Hartford Civic Center	
16 July 1983	Hartford	United States	Hartford Civic Center	
18 July 1983	Philadelphia	United States	The Spectrum	64,235
19 July 1983	Philadelphia	United States	The Spectrum	64,235
20 July 1983	Philadelphia	United States	The Spectrum	64,235
21 July 1983	Philadelphia	United States	The Spectrum	64,235
23 July 1983	Syracuse	United States	(Re-scheduled) – Carrier Dome	
25 July 1983	New York City	United States	Madison Square Garden	57,820
26 July 1983	New York City	United States	Madison Square Garden	57,820
27 July 1983	New York City	United States	Madison Square Garden	57,820
29 July 1983	Richfield	United States	Richfield Coliseum	
30 July 1983	Detroit	United States	Joe Louis Arena	37,268
31 July 1983	Detroit	United States	Joe Louis Arena	37,268
1 August 1983	Rosemont	United States	Rosemont Horizon	
2 August 1983	Rosemont	United States	Rosemont Horizon	
3 August 1983	Rosemont	United States	Rosemont Horizon	
7 August 1983	Edmonton	Canada	Commonwealth Stadium	60,000
9 August 1983	Vancouver	Canada	Pacific Coliseum	
11 August 1983	Tacoma	United States	Tacoma Dome	20,000
14 August 1983	Inglewood	United States	The Forum	
15 August 1983	Inglewood	United States	The Forum	
17 August 1983	Phoenix	United States	Arizona Veterans Memorial Coliseum	
19 August 1983	Dallas	United States	Reunion Arena	
20 August 1983	Austin	United States	Frank Erwin Center	
21 August 1983	Houston	United States	The Summit	
24 August 1983	Norfolk	United States	Scope Cultural and Convention Center	21,370
25 August 1983	Norfolk	United States	Scope Cultural and Convention Center	
27 August 1983	Landover	United States	Capital Centre	29,371
28 August 1983	Landover	United States	Capital Centre	
29 August 1983	Hershey	United States	Hersheypark Stadium	25,230
31 August 1983	Foxborough	United States	Sullivan Stadium	60,000
3 September 1983	Toronto	Canada	Canadian National Exhibition Stadium	101,239
4 September 1983	Toronto	Canada	Canadian National Exhibition Stadium	101,239
5 September 1983	Buffalo	United States	Buffalo Memorial Auditorium	
6 September 1983	Syracuse	United States	Carrier Dome	
9 September 1983	Anaheim	United States	Anaheim Stadium	67,401
11 September 1983	Vancouver	Canada	Pacific National Exhibition Coliseum	
12 September 1983	Vancouver	Canada	Pacific National Exhibition Coliseum	
14 September 1983	Winnipeg	Canada	Winnipeg Stadium	34,816
17 September 1983	Oakland	United States	Oakland Alameda Coliseum	57,920
Asia
20 October 1983	Tokyo	Japan	Nippon Budokan	42,984
21 October 1983	Tokyo	Japan	Nippon Budokan	42,984
22 October 1983	Tokyo	Japan	Nippon Budokan	42,984
24 October 1983	Tokyo	Japan	Nippon Budokan	42,984
25 October 1983	Yokohama	Japan	Yokohama Stadium	25,989
26 October 1983	Osaka	Japan	Osaka Prefectural Gymnasium	25,989
27 October 1983	Osaka	Japan	Osaka Prefectural Gymnasium	25,989
29 October 1983	Nagoya	Japan	Nagoya International Exhibition Hall	10,064
30 October 1983	Suita	Japan	Festival Plaza	
31 October 1983	Kyoto	Japan	Kyoto Prefectural Gymnasium	
Oceania
4 November 1983	Perth	Australia	Perth Entertainment Centre	23,063
5 November 1983	Perth	Australia	Perth Entertainment Centre	23,063
6 November 1983	Perth	Australia	Perth Entertainment Centre	23,063
9 November 1983	Adelaide	Australia	Adelaide Oval	18,409
12 November 1983	Melbourne	Australia	VFL Park	37,914
16 November 1983	Brisbane	Australia	Lang Park	26,757
19 November 1983	Sydney	Australia	RAS Showgrounds	
20 November 1983	Sydney	Australia	RAS Showgrounds	25,000
24 November 1983	Wellington	New Zealand	Athletic Park	50,000
26 November 1983	Auckland	New Zealand	Western Springs Stadium	80,000–90,000
Asia
3 December 1983	Singapore	Singapore	Former National Stadium	
5 December 1983	Bangkok	Thailand	Thai Army Sports Stadium	9000-14,981
7 December 1983	Hong Kong	Hong Kong	Hong Kong Coliseum	
8 December 1983	Hong Kong	Hong Kong	Hong Kong Coliseum	

== Song list ==
From David Bowie

- "Space Oddity"

From Hunky Dory

- "Life on Mars?"

From The Rise and Fall of Ziggy Stardust and the Spiders From Mars

- "Soul Love"
- "Star"
- "Hang On to Yourself"

From Aladdin Sane

- "Cracked Actor"
- "The Jean Genie"

From Pin Ups

- "I Can't Explain" (originally a non-album single (1965) by The Who; written by Pete Townshend)
- "Sorrow" (originally by The McCoys in 1965 and made famous by The Merseys the following year; written by Bob Feldman, Jerry Goldstein and Richard Gottehrer)

From Diamond Dogs

- "Rebel Rebel"

From Young Americans

- "Young Americans"
- "Fame" (Bowie, John Lennon, Carlos Alomar)

From Station to Station

- "Station to Station"
- "Golden Years"
- "TVC 15"
- "Stay"
- "Wild Is the Wind" (originally a single by Johnny Mathis, written by Dimitri Tiomkin and Ned Washington)

From Low

- "Breaking Glass" (Bowie, Dennis Davis, George Murray)
- "What in the World"

From "Heroes"

- "Joe the Lion"
- "'Heroes'" (Bowie, Brian Eno)

From Lodger

- "Red Sails" (Bowie, Eno)
- "Look Back in Anger" (Bowie, Eno)

From Scary Monsters (and Super Creeps)

- "Scary Monsters (and Super Creeps)"
- "Ashes to Ashes"
- "Fashion"

From Let's Dance

- "Modern Love"
- "China Girl" (originally from The Idiot (1977) by Iggy Pop; written by Pop and Bowie)
- "Let's Dance"
- "Cat People (Putting Out Fire)" (originally from the Cat People soundtrack (1982); written by Bowie and Giorgio Moroder)

Other songs:

- "Imagine" (originally from Imagine (1971) by John Lennon; written by Lennon)
- "White Light/White Heat" (from White Light/White Heat (1968) by The Velvet Underground; written by Lou Reed)

== Sources ==
- Buckley, David (2005) [1999]. Strange Fascination: The Definitive Biography of David Bowie (Revised ed.). Virgin Books. ISBN 9780753510025.
- Pegg, Nicholas (2016). The Complete David Bowie (Revised and updated ed.). London: Titan Books. ISBN 978-1-78565-365-0.
