= Without You (David Bowie song) =

Song by David Bowie

Single by David Bowie

from the album Let's Dance
- B-side: "Criminal World"
- Released: November 1983
- Recorded: December 1982
- Studio: Power Station, New York City
- Genre: Rock; post-disco
- Length: 3:08
- Label: EMI America – B 8190
- Songwriter: David Bowie
- Producers: David Bowie; Nile Rodgers

David Bowie singles chronology
"Modern Love" (1983)	"Without You" (1983)	"White Light/White Heat" (1983)

"Without You" is a song written and recorded by David Bowie in 1983 for his fifteenth studio album Let's Dance. It was released as a single by EMI America in the Netherlands, the US, Japan and Spain in November 1983.

The front cover features artwork by Keith Haring, while the back cover photograph is by longtime Bowie collaborator Denis O'Regan.

== Reception ==
The song was described as "a wonderful Chic-recalling arrangement that features a curiously restrained Bowie gliding effortlessly over the tightly constructed, bouncy framework" with sparse lyrics.

Sarah Blasko named it among her 2 favourite Bowie songs.

== Track listing ==
=== 7": EMI America / B 8190 (US) ===
1. "Without You" (David Bowie) – 3:08
2. "Criminal World" (Duncan Browne, Peter Godwin, Sean Lyons) – 4:25

== Personnel ==
- David Bowie – vocals
- Stevie Ray Vaughan – guitar
- Nile Rodgers – guitar
- Bernard Edwards – bass guitar
- Tony Thompson – drums
- Stan Harrison – saxophone
- Steve Elson – saxophone
- Frank Simms – backing vocals
- George Simms – backing vocals

Production

- David Bowie – producer
- Nile Rodgers – producer

== Chart performance ==
Chart (1984)	Peak position
US Billboard Hot 100	73

== See also ==
- List of post-disco artists and songs
