= Mac Gollehon =

American trumpet player

- Also known as: Chops
- Genres: Rock; pop; jazz; blues
- Occupation: Musician
- Instrument: Trumpet

Mac Gollehon is an American trumpet player who has played on over two hundred gold and platinum records and remixes. He is especially noted for his performances on David Bowie's Let's Dance, Duran Duran's records, Notorious and "Skin Trade", Billy Ocean's "Get Outta My Dreams", and Grace Jones' Inside Story. Down Beat called Gollehon's latest record, "A Molotov cocktail of electronic clave Bitches Brew funk and flat out brass playing is intelligent disco."

== Career ==
Mac Gollehon started out by playing with country bands at the age of 10 in his home of North Carolina. By age 13 he played the circus with bandleader Merle Evans. In high school, he played with a variety of bands, as well as the Roanoke Symphony Orchestra. At age 18 he went to Berklee College of Music and played the club circuit at night. During the summers he played with jazz legends like Buddy Morrow as well as Buddy Rich.

In 1979, Gollehon moved to New York City and was introduced to Miles Davis through a mutual friend, Davis gave Gollehon the nickname 'Chops'. It was around this time that he started to impress New York producers like Nile Rodgers, Arif Mardin, and Mike Chapman. He was noted for his ability to come up with arrangements on the fly, as was the standard in New York City at that time. Through gradually building his name on this scene he found himself working with the likes of Mick Jagger and Bruce Springsteen. Mac Gollehon also found himself as a longtime member of his musical hero Lester Bowie's group Brass Fantasy. this same period Gollehon found himself touring with many of the artists who he met in the studio. This led to extended stints with groups such as Duran Duran, Hall & Oates and Chaka Khan. He found himself on literally thousands of recordings and on dozens of Top 40 singles.

Throughout his career, Gollehon has frequently focused on Latin music. This culminated in stints with Latin legends like Héctor Lavoe, Mighty Sparrow, Arrow, Larry Harlow, Frankie Ruiz. Richie Ray and Hilton Ruiz. This has culminated with his most recent release, Mac Gollehon & The Hispanic Mechanics, All About Jazz said the record, "focuses on the grooves and rhythms that are at the forefront of both Latin musics like salsa and EDM." With other critics assenting - some going so far as to label him a pioneer of Latin EDM.

== Solo discography ==
- Smokin' Section (1996)
- Live at the Blue Note (1999)
- Smokin' Live (1999)
- In the Spirit of Fats Navarro (2000)
- Mac Straight Ahead (2010)
- Odyssey of Nostalgia (2011)
- La Fama (2012)
- Mac Gollehon & the Hispanic Mechanics (2016)
- The End Is the Beginning (2022)
- MAC Gollehon & The Hispanic Mechanics “Bite of the Street” (2023)
- MAC Gollehon & The Hispanic Mechanics “Pistoleros” (2025)

== Notable credits ==
Credits according to AllMusic

| Year | Album | Artist | Credit |
|---|---|---|---|
| 1982 | The Hunter | Blondie | Horn arrangements, trumpet |
| 1983 | Let's Dance | David Bowie | Trumpet |
| 1985 | When the Boys Meet the Girls | Sister Sledge | Trumpet, soloist |
| 1985 | Live at the Apollo | Hall & Oates | Trumpet, horn section |
| 1985 | Do You | Sheena Easton | Trumpet |
| 1986 | L Is for Lover | Al Jarreau | Musician, reeds |
| 1986 | Notorious | Duran Duran | Musician |
| 1988 | Big Thing | Duran Duran | Trumpet |
| 1989 | Sound + Vision | David Bowie | Trumpet |
| 1990 | Changesbowie | David Bowie | Trumpet |
| 1992 | Chic-ism | Chic | Trumpet, piccolo trumpet, flugelhorn |
| 1999 | Live at the Budokan | Chic | Trumpet |
| 2000 | Original Gold | Duran Duran | Trumpet |
| 2001 | Seven and the Ragged Tiger | Duran Duran | Musician |
| 2002 | In Japan | Chic | Trumpet |
| 2004 | Live at the Budokan | Chic | Member of attributed artist, trumpet |
| 2009 | Live at the Budokan | Chic | Trumpet |
| 2011 | Dance, Dance, Dance: The Best of Chic | Chic | Trumpet |
