= Loving the Alien (1983–1988) =

2018 box set by David Bowie

Box set by David Bowie
- Released: 12 October 2018
- Recorded: December 1982 – 30 August 1987
- Genres: Art rock; new wave; pop
- Label: Parlophone
- Producer: Various

David Bowie chronology
Never Let Me Down 2018 (2018)	Loving the Alien (1983–1988) (2018)	Glastonbury 2000 (2018)

David Bowie box set chronology
A New Career in a New Town (1977–1982) (2017)	Loving the Alien (1983–1988) (2018)	Spying Through a Keyhole (2019)

Professional ratings
Aggregate scores
Source	Rating
Metacritic	78/100
Review scores
Source	Rating
AllMusic	4/5 stars
The Austin Chronicle	3.5/5 stars
Pitchfork	7.1/10
PopMatters	8/10
Record Collector	4/5 stars
Under The Radar	7.5/10

Loving the Alien (1983–1988) is a box set by English singer-songwriter David Bowie, released on 12 October 2018. A follow-up to the compilations Five Years (1969–1973), Who Can I Be Now? (1974–1976), and A New Career in a New Town (1977–1982), the set covers the period of Bowie's career from 1983 to 1988, and includes eleven compact discs or fifteen LPs.

== Overview ==
Exclusive to the box set are Never Let Me Down 2018, a re-engineered version of his 1987 album, and Dance, an alternate 2018 version of a previously planned but scrapped 12" collection. Initially exclusive to this box set, but released separately later, are live albums from his Serious Moonlight and Glass Spider tours from 1983 and 1987, respectively. The Serious Moonlight live album was the first official audio release from the tour, using the same setlist and audio as the Serious Moonlight concert film (save for the addition of a live performance of "Modern Love", recorded in Montreal and originally released as the B-side to the song's studio recording), while the Glass Spider live album had been previously included with the 2007 DVD release of the Glass Spider concert film. The Serious Moonlight live album was originally proposed by Bowie as a stopgap release following Let's Dance, owed to writer's block following the 1983 tour and his lack of familiarity with his newfound audience.

The box set includes remastered editions of Let's Dance (1983), Tonight (1984) and Never Let Me Down (1987). It also includes Re:Call 4, a compilation of non-album singles, single versions, and B-sides from his albums and soundtrack releases for Labyrinth, Absolute Beginners and When the Wind Blows, all from 1986.

The set comes with a hardcover book with rarely seen and previously unpublished photos by photographers including Denis O'Regan, Greg Gorman, Herb Ritts and many others as well as historical press reviews and technical notes about the albums from producers/engineers Nile Rodgers, Hugh Padgham, Mario McNulty and Justin Shirley-Smith.

The remix compilation Dance was originally scheduled to be released by EMI in November 1985. The concept of the album, however, was vastly different from the version that appears in this box set. Seven tracks from the era were to have new additional production and mixing by Paul Sabu and Rusty Garner. This idea was later scrapped, but the album cover had already been shot and some physical copies of the sleeve they had made began circulating outside of the label before they were destroyed in bulk. The version of Dance that appears in Loving the Alien (1983–1988) is simply a collection of the original 12" remixes from the era and uses the same album art that was shot for the original concept in 1985.

One notable omission is "Too Dizzy", included on the initial release of Never Let Me Down but removed from later pressings.

A follow-up set, Brilliant Adventure (1992–2001), was announced in September 2021 and released on 26 November 2021; the announcement came following Warner Music Group's acquisition of the material Bowie released under Columbia Records between 2002 and 2017. the last box set, I Can't Give Everything Away (2002–2016), would be released on 12 September 2025.

== Track listing ==
=== Let's Dance (2018 remaster) ===
All tracks are written by David Bowie, except where noted.

Side one
No.	Title	Writer(s)	Length
1.	"Modern Love"		4:48
2.	"China Girl"	Bowie, Iggy Pop	5:33
3.	"Let's Dance"		7:47
4.	"Without You"		3:09
Total length:			21:17

Side two
No.	Title	Writer(s)	Length
5.	"Ricochet"		5:13
6.	"Criminal World"	Peter Godwin, Duncan Browne, Sean Lyons	4:15
7.	"Cat People (Putting Out Fire)"	Bowie, Giorgio Moroder	5:09
8.	"Shake It"		3:52
Total length:			18:39 (39:56)

=== Serious Moonlight (Live '83) ===
Side one
No.	Title	Writer(s)	Length
1.	"Look Back in Anger"	Bowie, Brian Eno	3:07
2.	""Heroes""	Bowie, Eno	5:09
3.	"What in the World"		3:44
4.	"Golden Years"		3:31
5.	"Fashion"		2:43
6.	"Let's Dance"		4:34
Total length:			22:48

Side two
No.	Title	Writer(s)	Length
7.	"Breaking Glass"	Bowie, George Murray, Dennis Davis	3:00
8.	"Life on Mars?"		4:07
9.	"Sorrow"	Bob Feldman, Jerry Goldstein, Richard Gottehrer	2:49
10.	"Cat People (Putting Out Fire)"	Bowie, Moroder	4:20
11.	"China Girl"	Bowie, Pop	5:27
12.	"Scary Monsters (And Super Creeps)"		3:42
13.	"Rebel Rebel"		2:24
Total length:			25:49

Side three
No.	Title	Writer(s)	Length
14.	"White Light/White Heat"	Lou Reed	5:36
15.	"Station to Station"		8:58
16.	"Cracked Actor"		3:58
17.	"Ashes to Ashes"		3:51
Total length:			22:23

Side four
No.	Title	Writer(s)	Length
18.	"Space Oddity" (with band introduction)		6:32
19.	"Young Americans"		5:25
20.	"Fame"	Bowie, Carlos Alomar, John Lennon	5:36
21.	"Modern Love"		3:54
Total length:			21:27 (92:27)

=== Tonight (2018 remaster) ===
Side one
No.	Title	Writer(s)	Length
1.	"Loving the Alien"		7:12
2.	"Don't Look Down"	Pop, James Williamson	4:11
3.	"God Only Knows"	Brian Wilson, Tony Asher	3:09
4.	"Tonight"	Bowie, Pop	3:45
Total length:			18:17

Side two
No.	Title	Writer(s)	Length
5.	"Neighborhood Threat"	Bowie, Pop, Ricky Gardiner	3:12
6.	"Blue Jean"		3:11
7.	"Tumble and Twirl"	Bowie, Pop	4:58
8.	"I Keep Forgettin'"	Jerry Leiber, Mike Stoller, Gil Garfield	2:35
9.	"Dancing with the Big Boys"	Bowie, Pop, Alomar	3:34
Total length:			17:30 (35:47)

=== Never Let Me Down (2018 remaster) ===
Side one
No.	Title	Writer(s)	Length
1.	"Day-In Day-Out"		5:39
2.	"Time Will Crawl"		4:20
3.	"Beat of Your Drum"		5:06
4.	"Never Let Me Down"	Bowie, Alomar	4:05
5.	"Zeroes"		5:47
Total length:			24:57

Side two
No.	Title	Writer(s)	Length
6.	"Glass Spider"		5:34
7.	"Shining Star (Makin' My Love)"		5:06
8.	"New York's in Love"		4:34
9.	"'87 and Cry"		4:21
10.	"Bang Bang"	Pop, Ivan Kral	4:30
Total length:			24:14 (49:11)

=== Never Let Me Down 2018 ===
Side one
No.	Title	Length
1.	"Day-In Day-Out"	5:26
2.	"Time Will Crawl"	4:26
3.	"Beat of Your Drum"	5:27
Total length:		15:19

Side two
No.	Title	Writer(s)	Length
4.	"Never Let Me Down"	Bowie, Alomar	4:26
5.	"Zeroes"		5:06
6.	"Glass Spider"		6:53
Total length:			16:25

Side three
No.	Title	Writer(s)	Length
7.	"Shining Star (Makin' My Love)" (featuring Laurie Anderson)		5:32
8.	"New York's in Love"		4:33
9.	"'87 and Cry"		4:25
10.	"Bang Bang"	Pop, Kral	4:42
Total length:			19:12 (50:56)

=== Glass Spider (Live Montreal '87) ===
Side one
No.	Title	Writer(s)	Length
1.	"Up the Hill Backwards"		3:51
2.	"Glass Spider"		5:55
3.	"Day-In Day-Out"		4:34
4.	"Bang Bang"	Pop, Kral	4:02
Total length:			18:22

Side two
No.	Title	Writer(s)	Length
5.	"Absolute Beginners"		7:08
6.	"Loving the Alien"		7:14
7.	"China Girl"	Bowie, Pop	4:55
8.	"Rebel Rebel"		3:30
Total length:			22:47

Side three
No.	Title	Writer(s)	Length
9.	"Fashion"		5:04
10.	"Scary Monsters (And Super Creeps)"		4:52
11.	"All the Madmen"		6:39
12.	"Never Let Me Down"	Bowie, Alomar	3:56
Total length:			20:36

Side four
No.	Title	Writer(s)	Length
13.	"Big Brother"		4:47
14.	"'87 and Cry"		4:07
15.	""Heroes""	Bowie, Eno	5:10
16.	"Sons of the Silent Age"		3:10
17.	"Time Will Crawl" (with band introduction)		5:23
Total length:			22:37

Side five
No.	Title	Length
18.	"Young Americans"	5:06
19.	"Beat of Your Drum"	4:37
20.	"The Jean Genie"	5:23
21.	"Let's Dance"	5:01
Total length:		20:07

Side six
No.	Title	Writer(s)	Length
22.	"Fame"	Bowie, Alomar, Lennon	7:05
23.	"Time"		5:11
24.	"Blue Jean"		3:26
25.	"Modern Love"		4:53
Total length:			20:35 (125:04)

=== Dance ===
Side one
No.	Title	Writer(s)	Length
1.	"Shake It" (Re-mix aka Long Version)		5:21
2.	"Blue Jean" (Extended Dance Mix)		5:20
3.	"Dancing with the Big Boys" (Extended Dance Mix)	Bowie, Pop, Alomar	7:31
Total length:			18:12

Side two
No.	Title	Writer(s)	Length
4.	"Tonight" (Vocal Dance Mix)	Bowie, Pop	4:31
5.	"Don't Look Down" (Extended Dance Mix)	Pop, Williamson	4:55
6.	"Loving the Alien" (Extended Dub Mix)		7:15
Total length:			17:17

Side three
No.	Title	Writer(s)	Length
7.	"Tumble and Twirl" (Extended Dance Mix)	Bowie, Pop	5:05
8.	"Underground" (Extended Dance Mix)		7:54
9.	"Day-In Day-Out" (Groucho Mix)		6:28
Total length:			19:27

Side four
No.	Title	Writer(s)	Length
10.	"Time Will Crawl" (Dance Crew Mix)		5:34
11.	"Shining Star (Makin’ My Love)" (12” mix)		6:27
12.	"Never Let Me Down" (Dub/Acapella)	Bowie, Alomar	6:02
Total length:			18:03 (72:59)

=== Re:Call 4 (remastered tracks) ===
Side one
No.	Title	Writer(s)	Length
1.	"Let's Dance" (single version)		4:09
2.	"China Girl" (single version)	Bowie, Pop	4:17
3.	"Modern Love" (single version)		3:59
4.	"This Is Not America" (The theme from The Falcon and the Snowman) (David Bowie/Pat Metheny Group)	Bowie, Pat Metheny, Lyle Mays	3:51
5.	"Loving the Alien" (re-mixed version)		4:43
Total length:			20:59

Side two
No.	Title	Writer(s)	Length
6.	"Don't Look Down" (re-mixed version)	Pop, Williamson	4:06
7.	"Dancing in the Street" (Clearmountain mix) (David Bowie and Mick Jagger)	Marvin Gaye, William "Mickey" Stevenson, Ivy Jo Hunter	3:11
8.	"Absolute Beginners" (from Absolute Beginners)		8:04
9.	"That's Motivation" (from Absolute Beginners)		4:19
10.	"Volare" (from Absolute Beginners)	Domenico Modugno, Franco Migliacci	3:15
Total length:			22:55

Side three
No.	Title	Writer(s)	Length
11.	"Labyrinth Opening Titles/Underground" (from Labyrinth)	Trevor Jones, Bowie	3:21
12.	"Magic Dance" (from Labyrinth)		4:12
13.	"As the World Falls Down" (from Labyrinth)		4:50
14.	"Within You" (from Labyrinth)		3:29
15.	"Underground" (from Labyrinth)		5:57
Total length:			21:49

Side four
No.	Title	Writer(s)	Length
16.	"When the Wind Blows" (single version) (from When the Wind Blows)	Bowie, Erdal Kızılçay	3:35
17.	"Day-In Day-Out" (single version)		4:14
18.	"Julie"		3:34
19.	"Beat of Your Drum" (vinyl album edit)		4:32
20.	"Glass Spider" (vinyl album edit)		4:56
Total length:			20:51

Side five
No.	Title	Writer(s)	Length
21.	"Shining Star (Makin' My Love)" (vinyl album edit)		4:05
22.	"New York's in Love" (vinyl album edit)		3:55
23.	"'87 and Cry" (vinyl album edit)		3:53
24.	"Bang Bang" (vinyl album edit)	Pop, Kral	4:03
25.	"Time Will Crawl" (single version)		4:03
Total length:			19:59

Side six
No.	Title	Writer(s)	Length
26.	"Girls" (extended edit)	Bowie, Kızılçay	5:34
27.	"Never Let Me Down" (7” remix edit)	Bowie, Alomar	3:59
28.	"Bang Bang" (live – promotional mix)	Pop, Kral	4:07
29.	"Tonight" (live) (Tina Turner with David Bowie)	Bowie, Pop	4:19
30.	"Let's Dance" (live) (Tina Turner with David Bowie)		3:25
Total length:			21:24 (127:57)

== Charts ==
Chart (2018)	Peak position
Austrian Albums (Ö3 Austria)	48
Belgian Albums (Ultratop Flanders)	21
Belgian Albums (Ultratop Wallonia)	34
Dutch Albums (Album Top 100)	67
French Albums (SNEP)	169
German Albums (Offizielle Top 100)	18
Irish Albums (IRMA)	52
Italian Albums (FIMI)	62
Scottish Albums (Official Charts)	16
Spanish Albums (Promusicae)	81
Swiss Albums (Schweizer Hitparade)	56
UK Albums (Official Charts)	19
