= Time Will Crawl =

Song by David Bowie

Single by David Bowie

from the album Never Let Me Down
- B-side: "Girls"
- Released: 15 June 1987
- Recorded: Autumn 1986
- Studio: Mountain (Montreux, Switzerland)
- Length: 4:18 (album version); 4:54 (2008 remix)
- Label: EMI
- Songwriter: David Bowie
- Producers: David Bowie; David Richards

David Bowie singles chronology
"Day-In Day-Out" (1987)	"Time Will Crawl" (1987)	"Never Let Me Down" (1987)

Music video
- "Time Will Crawl (Single Version)" on YouTube

"Time Will Crawl" is a song recorded by the English singer David Bowie, serving as the second single for his seventeenth album, Never Let Me Down (1987). It was written by Bowie and produced by him and David Richards. Released in 1987 by EMI, the recording addresses the destruction of the planet by pollution and industry; the Chernobyl disaster was a direct influence on the lyrics. The accompanying video served as a teaser to Bowie's Glass Spider Tour (1987). Music critics reviewed "Time Will Crawl" positively, commending its lyrics and production, and describing it one of Bowie's best efforts of the mid– to late–1980s. Additionally, Bowie later called the song one of his favourites from his entire career. Commercially, the single peaked at number 33 on the UK Singles Chart and at number seven on Billboard's Mainstream Rock Tracks chart.

== Background and release ==
"Time Will Crawl" was written and recorded by Bowie in mid– to late–1986 at Mountain Studios in Montreux, Switzerland. He produced the recording alongside David Richards. Initially the track was titled "How We War", but Bowie changed the name prior to the album's release. Lyrically, the song addresses the pollution and destruction of the planet by industry. Bowie has cited hearing of the Chernobyl disaster in April 1986 as the genesis of the lyrics, and was in Switzerland at the time of the accident. He said, "I was taking a break from recording [...] it was a beautiful day and we were outside on a small piece of lawn facing the Alps and the lake. Our engineer, who had been listening to the radio, shot out of the studio and shouted: 'There's a whole lot of shit going down in Russia.' The Swiss news had picked up a Norwegian radio station that was screaming – to anyone who would listen – that huge billowing clouds were moving over from the Motherland and they weren't rain clouds." In another contemporary interview, Bowie said that the song "deals with the idea that someone in one's own community could be the one responsible for blowing up the world." At the time, he also stated that it was his favourite song from the album.

"Time Will Crawl" was released in June 1987 by EMI. As a B-side, the single featured Bowie's version "Girls" which he had written with Erdal Kizilcay earlier in 1986 and offered to Tina Turner for release on her album Break Every Rule (1986) first.

In 2008, a newly remixed version of the song (the "MM Remix" produced by studio engineer Mario J. McNulty) was included on Bowie's iSelect compilation album, his list of all-time favourites. McNulty removed the original drum track, added new drum overdubs by drummer Sterling Campbell and included further new instrumentation, including a string quartet. At that time, Bowie indicated a desire to improve the rest of the songs from Never Let Me Down, a project that came to fruition after Bowie's death with the release of Never Let Me Down 2018 in the Loving The Alien (1983-1988) (2018) box set. According to McNulty, Bowie had specific ideas of what he wanted to do to the song for the remix, calling his willingness to make such drastic changes to the song "fearless." McNulty said when they met to discuss the remix, Bowie was "sitting on his living room floor with a laptop, taking notes, just hanging out, [and said] 'I wanna do this to this, get rid of this, I wanna put drums on this, I wanna put string on this, all right … when can we do it?'"

"Time Will Crawl" was added to the Les Amants du Pont-Neuf soundtrack (1991), Bowie – The Video Collection (1993), Best of Bowie (2002), The Platinum Collection (2006), and The Best of David Bowie 1980–1987 (2007), while the 2008 remixed version appeared on iSelect (2008) and Nothing Has Changed (2014). An updated version of the 2008 "MM Remix", as well as remixes of the original single and its b-side "Girls" appear in the box set Loving the Alien (1983-1988).

== Promotion ==
Bowie, middle, with the dance troupe in a video still from the official video. In the video, the troupe is seen practicing a variety of dance moves for the upcoming Glass Spider Tour

An accompanying music video was directed by Tim Pope, directing his first and only Bowie video, though Pope later directed Bowie's 50th birthday celebration video in 1997. The clip was directed during rehearsals for Bowie's Glass Spider Tour, and previewed some of the elaborate dance routines that would be used during performances of "Loving the Alien" (1985), "Fashion" (1980) and "Sons of the Silent Age" (1977). The dancers from the tour (Melissa Hurley, Constance Marie, Craig Allen Rothwell, Viktor Manoel, and Stephen Nichols) all featured in the video alongside tour guitarists Peter Frampton and Carlos Alomar. Toni Basil, Bowie's long-time friend, was responsible for the choreography. The video was later released on Bowie – The Video Collection (1993), Best of Bowie (2002) and The Best of David Bowie 1980–1987 (2007); the limited edition 12" single featured a still from the video on its cover.

"Time Will Crawl" was performed live in 1987 on all dates of his Glass Spider Tour, later released on the deluxe edition of Glass Spider (2007). That same year, Bowie also made an appearance during BBC's "Top of the Pops", but his performance was ultimately not aired on television due to the song leaving the top 40 of the UK Singles Chart at that time. However, his performance was later uploaded onto YouTube.

== Critical reception ==
Generally, music critics considered this song to be one of the best of Bowie's mid– to late–1980s efforts. Bowie biographer Nicholas Pegg praised both the track's production and lyrical content, saying, "the lyric, too, is among the album's best, a pleasing return to a non-linear approach that paints a desolate landscape of poisoned rivers, nuclear devastation and genetic mutation reminiscent of Diamond Dogs." AllMusic critic Dave Thompson praised the song for its "ecologically inclined lyric, a tremendously buoyant vocal, and a fabulous Sid McGinnis guitar solo [that] make Bowie sound like he's really enjoying himself", which he considered a "rarity" for Bowie in the late 1980s.

Entertainment Weekly included the video for "Time Will Crawl" in their list of top 20 Bowie videos after he died in 2016, and praised Bowie's performance, saying "...just pay attention to the way Bowie moves in this clip. There's no wasted motion, and every hair flip and tumble recovery has real meaning. Even when not dressed as Ziggy Stardust or Aladdin Sane, you still couldn't take your eyes off of him." In a 2016 list ranking every Bowie single from worst to best, Ultimate Classic Rock placed "Time Will Crawl" at number 74, calling it one of the better tracks on Never Let Me Down, but "there's not a whole lot there to salvage the project".

== Track listing ==
"Time Will Crawl" was written solely by Bowie. The B-side, "Girls", has lyrics and production done by the singer and Erdal Kızılçay. A limited 7" single was issued in some territories whose sleeve folded out to a double-sided poster. The "Extended dance mix" was remixed by co-producer Richards, and the "Dance Crew Mix" by Chris Lord-Alge. For the Japanese version of "Girls" (sung by Bowie in Japanese), Kiri Teshigahara was the language coach and Hiro Hozumi translated the lyrics. All tracks were made available for digital download in 2007.

- UK 7" single
1. "Time Will Crawl" – 4:03 (Single Version)
2. "Girls" – 4:13 (Single Edit)
- UK 12" single
1. "Time Will Crawl" (Extended dance mix) – 6:11
2. "Time Will Crawl" (LP version) – 4:18
3. "Girls" (Extended edit) – 5:35
- UK 12" single #2
1. "Time Will Crawl" (Dance crew mix) – 5:43
2. "Time Will Crawl" (Dub) – 5:23
3. "Girls" (Japanese version) – 4:06

== Credits and personnel ==
Credits adapted from the liner notes of Never Let Me Down.

Technical and composing credits

- David Bowie – composer, producer, vocals
- David Richards – producer
- Carlos Alomar – guitar
- Sid McGinnis – guitar
- Erdal Kizilcay – bass, drums, keyboards

MM Remix

- Sterling Campbell – drums
- Martha Mooke, Krista Bennion Feeney, Robert Chausow and Matthew Goeke – string quartet
- Gregor Kitzis – string arrangements
- Mario J. McNulty – engineering

== Chart performance ==
Chart	Peak position
Ireland (IRMA)	18
Netherlands (Single Top 100)	71
UK Singles (Official Charts)	33
US Mainstream Rock (Billboard)	7
West Germany (GfK)	57
