= The Best of David Bowie 1980/1987 =

Greatest hits album by David Bowie
- Released: 19 March 2007
- Recorded: 1979–1987
- Genre: Rock
- Length: 77:14 (CD only)
- Label: EMI/Virgin
- Producer: Producer varies from track to track

David Bowie chronology
The Platinum Collection (2005)	The Best of David Bowie 1980/1987 (2007)	David Bowie (2007)

David Bowie compilation chronology
The Collection (2005)	The Best of David Bowie 1980/1987 (2007)	iSelect (2008)

Professional ratings
Review scores
Source	Rating
AllMusic	4/5 stars
Music Box	3/5 stars
Pitchfork	(6.0/10)
Prefix Magazine	4/10 stars

The Best of David Bowie 1980/1987 is a compilation album by the English singer-songwriter David Bowie. The CD was originally released by EMI as part of The Platinum Collection in 2005/2006. The 2007 release is part of EMI's two-disc Sight & Sound series, each of which features a CD and DVD of material from the same artist. The DVD portion of the collection features two videos previously unreleased on DVD - "When the Wind Blows" and "The Drowned Girl".

== Track listing ==
All songs written by David Bowie, except where noted.

=== CD ===
No.	Title	Writer(s)	Place of Origin	Length
1.	"Let's Dance" (Single version)		Let's Dance, 1983	4:07
2.	"Ashes to Ashes" (Single version)		Scary Monsters (And Super Creeps), 1980	3:36
3.	"Under Pressure" (with Queen)	Bowie, Freddie Mercury, Brian May, John Deacon, Roger Taylor	Non-album single, 1981; found on Hot Space the following year	4:05
4.	"Fashion" (Single version)		Scary Monsters (And Super Creeps)	3:26
5.	"Modern Love" (Single version)		Let's Dance	3:58
6.	"China Girl" (Single version)	Bowie, Jim Osterburg (a.k.a. Iggy Pop)	Let's Dance	4:17
7.	"Scary Monsters (And Super Creeps)" (Single version)		Scary Monsters (And Super Creeps)	3:32
8.	"Up the Hill Backwards"		Scary Monsters (And Super Creeps)	3:15
9.	"Alabama Song"	Kurt Weill, Bertolt Brecht	Non-album single, 1980	3:52
10.	"The Drowned Girl (Vom ertrunkenen Mädchen)"	Brecht, Weill	Baal, 1982	2:26
11.	"Cat People (Putting Out Fire)" (Film version single edit)	Bowie, Giorgio Moroder	Cat People soundtrack, 1982; later re-recorded for and found on Let's Dance	4:12
12.	"This Is Not America" (with the Pat Metheny Group)	Bowie, Pat Metheny, Lyle Mays	The Falcon and the Snowman soundtrack, 1985	3:51
13.	"Loving the Alien"		Tonight, 1984	7:08
14.	"Absolute Beginners" (Single version)		Absolute Beginners soundtrack, 1986	5:37
15.	"When the Wind Blows"	Bowie, Erdal Kızılçay	When the Wind Blows soundtrack, 1986	3:34
16.	"Blue Jean"		Tonight	3:11
17.	"Day-In Day-Out" (Single version)		Never Let Me Down, 1987	4:11
18.	"Time Will Crawl"		Never Let Me Down	4:18
19.	"Underground" (Single version)		Labyrinth soundtrack/studio album, 1986	4:26

=== DVD ===
No.	Title	Length
1.	"Ashes to Ashes"
2.	"Fashion"
3.	"Under Pressure"
4.	"The Drowned Girl" (Previously unreleased)
5.	"Let's Dance"
6.	"China Girl" (Censored version)
7.	"Modern Love"
8.	"Cat People (Putting Out Fire)"
9.	"Blue Jean"
10.	"Loving the Alien" (Censored version)
11.	"Absolute Beginners"
12.	"Underground"
13.	"When the Wind Blows" (Previously unreleased)
14.	"Day-In Day-Out"
15.	"Time Will Crawl"

== Chart performance ==
Chart (2007–16)	Peak position
Australian Albums (ARIA)	30
Austrian Albums (Ö3 Austria)	44
Dutch Albums (Album Top 100)	98
French Albums (SNEP)	51
Irish Albums (IRMA)	47
Italian Albums (FIMI)	59
New Zealand Albums (RMNZ)	16
Scottish Albums (Official Charts)	31
UK Albums (Official Charts)	34
