= Loving the Alien (disambiguation) =

"Loving the Alien" is a 1985 single by David Bowie.

Loving the Alien may refer to:

- Loving the Alien (1983–1988), a box set by David Bowie
- "Loving the Alien", the name of an episode of the War of the Worlds TV series
- "Loving the Alien", a song on the Velvet Revolver album Contraband
- Loving the Alien (novel), a novel in the Past Doctor Adventures series of Doctor Who novels
