= The Platinum Collection (David Bowie album) =

Box set by David Bowie
- Released: 7 November 2005
- Recorded: 1969–1987
- Genre: Rock
- Length: 223:59
- Label: EMI/Virgin
- Producer: Producer varies from track to track

David Bowie chronology
The Collection (2005)	The Platinum Collection (2005)	The Best of 1980/1987 (2007)

David Bowie box set chronology
Sound + Vision (2005)	The Platinum Collection (2005)	David Bowie (2007)

Professional ratings
Review scores
Source	Rating
AllMusic	4.5/5 stars
The Encyclopedia of Popular Music	4/5 stars

The Platinum Collection is a box set by English singer-songwriter David Bowie, released in 2005 by EMI and Virgin Records. The period from 1969 to 1987 is summarised over three discs. The first disc is the same as the compilation The Best of David Bowie 1969/1974, which was released in 1997, and the second disc is the same as the 1998 compilation The Best of David Bowie 1974/1979. The third disc, original to this collection upon its release in 2005, was later re-released separately as an independent compilation The Best of David Bowie 1980/1987 by EMI on 19 March 2007. This 2007 release was part of EMI's two-disc Sight & Sound series of releases and features a DVD of 1980s videos on the second disc.

== Track listing ==
All songs written by David Bowie, except where noted.

=== Disc one (1969–1974) ===
No.	Title	Writer(s)	Place of Origin	Length
1.	"The Jean Genie"		Aladdin Sane, 1973	4:08
2.	"Space Oddity"		David Bowie, 1969	5:15
3.	"Starman"		The Rise and Fall of Ziggy Stardust and the Spiders from Mars, 1972	4:18
4.	"Ziggy Stardust"		The Rise and Fall of Ziggy Stardust and the Spiders from Mars	3:16
5.	"John, I'm Only Dancing" (Sax version)		Non-album single, released in 1973; the original version released the previous year	2:42
6.	"Rebel Rebel"		Diamond Dogs, 1974	4:30
7.	"Let's Spend the Night Together"	Mick Jagger, Keith Richards	Aladdin Sane; originally by The Rolling Stones released as a non-album double A-side single in the UK and Between the Buttons in the U.S. in 1967	3:07
8.	"Suffragette City"		The Rise and Fall of Ziggy Stardust and the Spiders from Mars	3:27
9.	"Oh! You Pretty Things"		Hunky Dory, 1971	3:14
10.	"Velvet Goldmine"		B-side of the 1975 single reissue of "Space Oddity"; recorded in 1971 for Ziggy Stardust	3:11
11.	"Drive-In Saturday"		Aladdin Sane	4:29
12.	"Diamond Dogs"		Diamond Dogs	6:05
13.	"Changes"		Hunky Dory	3:34
14.	"Sorrow"	Bob Feldman, Jerry Goldstein, Richard Gottehrer	Pin Ups, 1973; originally by The McCoys in 1965 and made famous by The Merseys the following year	2:55
15.	"The Prettiest Star" (Marc Bolan stereo version)		Recorded in 1970 as a follow-up to "Space Oddity"; re-recorded for Aladdin Sane in 1972	3:14
16.	"Life on Mars?"		Hunky Dory	3:52
17.	"Aladdin Sane (1913–1938–197?)"		Aladdin Sane	5:10
18.	"The Man Who Sold the World"		The Man Who Sold the World, 1970/1971	3:56
19.	"Rock 'n' Roll Suicide"		The Rise and Fall of Ziggy Stardust and the Spiders from Mars	3:00
20.	"All the Young Dudes" (Mono version)		Originally by Mott the Hoople from All the Young Dudes, 1972; was recorded in that same year for Aladdin Sane and was released in mono sound for this compilation	4:11

=== Disc two (1974–1979) ===
No.	Title	Writer(s)	Place of Origin	Length
1.	"Sound and Vision"		Low, 1977	3:05
2.	"Golden Years" (Single version)		Station to Station, 1976	3:29
3.	"Fame"	Bowie, Carlos Alomar, John Lennon	Young Americans, 1975	4:14
4.	"Young Americans" (U.S. single version)		Young Americans	3:15
5.	"John, I'm Only Dancing (Again)"		Non-album single, 1979; 1974 re-recorded version of "John, I'm Only Dancing" from 1972/1973	7:00
6.	"Can You Hear Me?"		Young Americans	5:07
7.	"Wild Is the Wind"	Dimitri Tiomkin, Ned Washington	Station to Station; originally by Johnny Mathis for the film of the same name, 1957	6:00
8.	"Knock on Wood" (Live)	Steve Cropper, Eddie Floyd	David Live, 1974; originally by Eddie Floyd from Knock on Wood, 1966	3:00
9.	"TVC 15" (Single version)		Station to Station	3:34
10.	"1984"		Diamond Dogs	3:29
11.	"It's Hard to Be a Saint in the City"	Bruce Springsteen	Sound + Vision box set, 1989; recorded in 1975 for Station to Station	3:49
12.	"Look Back in Anger"	Bowie, Brian Eno	Lodger, 1979	3:08
13.	"The Secret Life of Arabia"	Bowie, Eno, Alomar	"Heroes", 1977	3:48
14.	"DJ"	Bowie, Eno, Alomar	Lodger	4:02
15.	"Beauty and the Beast"		"Heroes"	3:36
16.	"Breaking Glass"	Bowie, Dennis Davis, George Murray	Low	1:53
17.	"Boys Keep Swinging"	Bowie, Eno	Lodger	3:20
18.	""Heroes"" (Single version)	Bowie, Eno	"Heroes"	3:33

=== Disc three (1980–1987) ===
No.	Title	Writer(s)	Place of Origin	Length
1.	"Let's Dance" (Single version)		Let's Dance, 1983	4:07
2.	"Ashes to Ashes" (Single version)		Scary Monsters (And Super Creeps), 1980	3:36
3.	"Under Pressure" (with Queen)	Bowie, Freddie Mercury, Brian May, John Deacon, Roger Taylor	Non-album single, 1981; later found on Hot Space the following year	4:05
4.	"Fashion" (Single version)		Scary Monsters (And Super Creeps)	3:26
5.	"Modern Love" (Single version)		Let's Dance	3:58
6.	"China Girl" (Single version)	Bowie, Jim Osterberg (a.k.a. Iggy Pop)	Let's Dance	4:17
7.	"Scary Monsters (And Super Creeps)" (Single version)		Scary Monsters (And Super Creeps)	3:32
8.	"Up the Hill Backwards"		Scary Monsters (And Super Creeps)	3:15
9.	"Alabama Song"	Kurt Weill, Bertolt Brecht	Non-album single, 1980	3:52
10.	"The Drowned Girl"	Brecht, Weill	Baal, 1982	2:26
11.	"Cat People (Putting Out Fire)" (Single version)	Bowie, Giorgio Moroder	Cat People soundtrack, 1982; later re-recorded for and found on Let's Dance	4:12
12.	"This Is Not America" (with the Pat Metheny Group)	Bowie, Pat Metheny, Lyle Mays	The Falcon and the Snowman soundtrack, 1985	3:51
13.	"Loving the Alien"		Tonight, 1984	7:08
14.	"Absolute Beginners" (Single version)		Absolute Beginners soundtrack, 1986	5:37
15.	"When the Wind Blows"	Bowie, Erdal Kızılçay	When the Wind Blows soundtrack, 1986	3:34
16.	"Blue Jean"		Tonight	3:11
17.	"Day-In Day-Out" (Single version)		Never Let Me Down, 1987	4:11
18.	"Time Will Crawl"		Never Let Me Down	4:18
19.	"Underground" (Single version)		Labyrinth soundtrack/studio album, 1986	4:26

== Chart performance ==
Chart (2005–16)	Peak position
Belgian Albums (Ultratop Flanders)	96
Belgian Albums (Ultratop Wallonia)	145
Dutch Albums (Album Top 100)	25
Irish Albums (IRMA)	53
Italian Albums (FIMI)	35
Scottish Albums (Official Charts)	52
Spanish Albums (Promusicae)	41
Swedish Albums (Sverigetopplistan)	26
UK Albums (OCC)	53
US Billboard 200	65

== Certifications ==
Region	Certification	Certified units/sales
Italy (FIMI) sales since 2009	Gold	25,000^{‡}
United Kingdom (BPI)	Gold	100,000^{^}
^{^} Shipments figures based on certification alone.^{‡} Sales+streaming figures based on certification alone.
