= Day-In Day-Out =

Song by David Bowie

- 12" single picture sleeve

Single by David Bowie

from the album Never Let Me Down
- B-side: "Julie"
- Released: 23 March 1987
- Recorded: September - December 1986
- Studio: Mountain (Montreux, Switzerland); Power Station (New York City)
- Genre: R&B
- Length: 5:35 (CD version); 4:38 (LP version); 4:14 (Single version)
- Label: EMI
- Songwriter: David Bowie
- Producers: David Bowie; David Richards

David Bowie singles chronology
"Magic Dance" (1987)	"Day-In Day-Out" (1987)	"Time Will Crawl" (1987)

Music video
- "Day-In Day-Out" on YouTube

"Day-In Day-Out" is a song recorded by the English singer David Bowie, serving as the opening track for his seventeenth studio album, Never Let Me Down (1987). It was issued as a single on 23 March 1987 ahead of the record's release. The recording was solely written by Bowie, while production was handled by him along with David Richards. An R&B track, "Day-In Day-Out" criticizes the treatment of the homeless in the United States at that time, and deals with the depths to which a young mother sinks to feed her child.

An accompanying music video for the single was shot in 1987, being banned by some stations as a result of its content, although it was still nominated for a 1987 MTV Video Music award in the category of "Best Male Video". Commercially, "Day-In Day-Out" was the most successful single from Never Let Me Down, peaking at number 17 in the United Kingdom as well as charting within the top 40 in several other countries.

A re-engineered version of the song that includes Bowie's original vocals, some original and new instrumentation, and new mastering was released in 2018 as part of the album Never Let Me Down 2018, part of the Loving the Alien (1983–1988) box set.

== Background and release ==
"Day-In Day-Out" was written by Bowie at his home in Montreux, Switzerland, along with most of the rest of Never Let Me Down in mid-1986. It was recorded in September and October of 1986 at Mountain Studios in the same city, with follow-up sessions at Power Station in New York City in November and December later that year. The singer penned the song out of concern for the treatment of the homeless in the United States, a foray into social commentary that he would further pursue with his grunge-precursor band Tin Machine two years later.

"Day-In Day-Out" is an R&B song, being reminiscent of some of the singer's R&B work in the 1970s. One author said that it is "an example of Bowie's strength in the R&B genre." The lyrics of the song were compared by one writer to those of Dolly Parton's "9 to 5" (1980), and deal with the depths a young mother has to sink to feed her child. Bowie claimed the song was selected as the lead-off single for Never Let Me Down "more as a statement of energy" about the album, as opposed to directly trying for a chart-topping single. It was released on 23 March 1987 by EMI on multiple 7" and 12" single formats, featuring B-side single "Julie". A video EP was also distributed that year. The single was later included in several compilations, including Bowie: The Singles 1969–1993 / The Singles Collection (1993), Bowie – The Video Collection (1993), Best of Bowie (2002), The Platinum Collection (2005) and The Best of David Bowie 1980–1987 (2007).

A Spanish-language version of "Day-In-Day-Out", known as "Al Alba" or "Dia Tras Dia", was recorded in 1987 in order to boost interest in Bowie's first-ever concerts in Spain as part of his Glass Spider Tour (1987). It earned a single airing on Spanish radio prior to the concerts and was never released as a stand-alone single, although it was made available for digital download in 2007.

"Day-In Day-Out" was performed live during the Glass Spider Tour (1987), and was included on the concert video release Glass Spider (1988).

Re-recorded and re-mastered versions of "Day-In Day-Out" appears in the box set Loving the Alien (1983–1988) (2018). For the re-recorded version of the song, album engineer Mario J. McNulty discovered from the original master tapes that Bowie had recorded the Borneo Horns (Stanley Harrison, Lenny Pickett, Steve Elson and Arif Mardin) playing live for the song, but had elected to replace them with synthesized horns. McNulty restored the live horns in the new version, saying that the track now had "one foot in the past and another in the present".

== Critical reception ==
A shot of Bowie from the music video for the song

Upon release, "Day-In Day-Out" received mixed reviews from music critics. Complaints about poor studio production were common, although publications did find the song to be "fun" and "danceable". Bowie biographer Nicholas Pegg called the track "frustrating", for on one hand being "a pretty fine song", but on the other, "[encapsulating] everything that's initially promising but ultimately infuriating" about the album. He concluded, "Somewhere in there is a concerted attempt to reclaim Bowie's former territory of guitar-based rock'n'roll, but 'Day-In Day-Out' suffers badly from over-elaboration: it's a slab of 1980s soft-rock which now [in 2016] sounds incredibly dated by comparison with much of Bowie's earlier work." Record Collector's Jamie Atkins writes: "What could have been three minutes of tough, funk-inflected new-wave rock ended up as a kitchen-sink's worth of squalling feedback and ghastly synths."

B-side single "Julie" was described in one biography as "Bowie ... casting himself as a criminal lover" in a song where "passion is at the heart of the song, [but] the recurring presence of a gun takes the buoyant shine off the scene." Bowie biographer David Buckley called "Julie" the "catchiest" song of all the tracks from the Never Let Me Down sessions, and lamented that the recording was relegated to mere B-side status. Pegg agreed, calling it "arguably one of the best tracks from the whole [Never Let Me Down recording] session", and thought it might have been a hit if Bowie had released it as a single on its own.

== Music video ==
=== Background and development ===
An accompanying music video for "Day-In Day-Out" was shot in Los Angeles in early 1987, with Bowie claiming it was "not going to sell the song at all", and was designed to explore the music video as a storytelling format over promoting the track itself. The singer also took a hand in designing and storyboarding the visual, saying, "I do the original drawings, the main shot for every situation, and then the storyboardist puts them into sequence, storyboarding backwards and forwards from that. Then I put in the major camera angles that I think would be interesting or different. And Julien [Temple] puts in his input. I started working this way on the 'Ashes to Ashes' video with David Mallet. It was my first real big attempt and it won awards at the time for being a new way of doing videos."

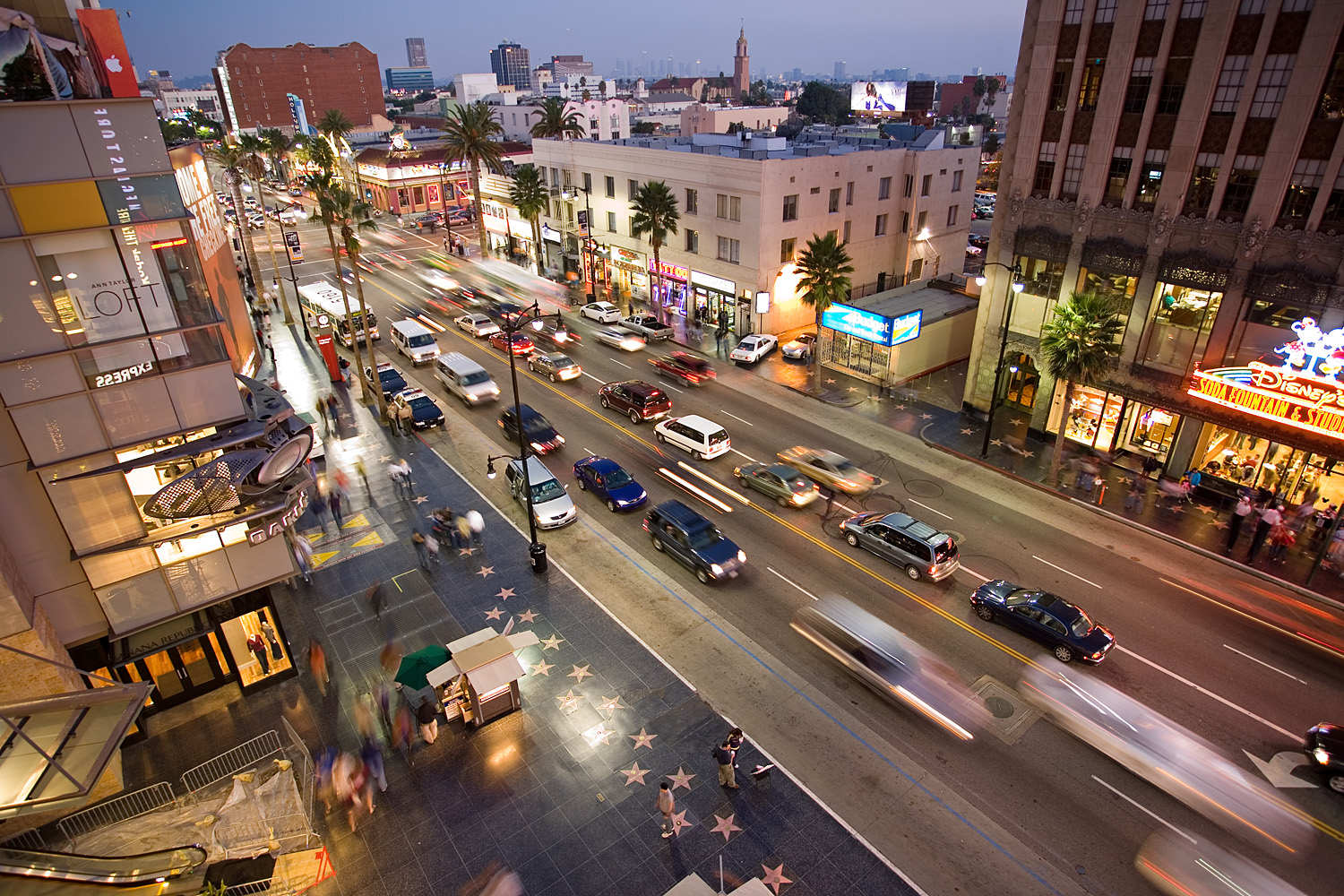
The music video for "Day-In Day-Out" was shot on the Hollywood Boulevard (pictured) at night.

Julien Temple and Bowie co-directed the video, which made the song's message explicit, showing a young couple's struggle against an uncaring society. Bowie worked with Los Angeles theater group "Skid Row" to represent the homeless in the video. Tony Selznik taught Bowie to roller skate for the video, recalling in 2013, "David came across as very humble and in between careers, almost. He was disillusioned with the music industry. I taught him to skate in a parking lot. We shot the video on Hollywood Boulevard at night, with me in a wig and leather jacket as his double for some scenes. The only bad fall involved the instructor: my wheels came off, I was bleeding everywhere, and David helped me clean up. He was so nice, normal."

=== Controversy and recognition ===
The music video was banned by some TV stations, even after edits removed the female protagonist's heavily implied rape, swapped in an alternate version of a scene where the couple's child spells out "Mom", "Food" and "Fuck" in building blocks (words which represented the child's cycle of dependency; the alternate version had the child spell out the meaningless words "Mom", "Look" and "Luck"), and removed a closing scene of a young man urinating on Ronald Reagan's star on the Hollywood Walk of Fame. The music video received an 18 certificate from the British Board of Film Classification (BBFC), both in cinemas and a home video release through Picture Music International.

Concerning the clip's ban, Bowie confessed, "I think it's ludicrous. [The censors] got caught up in the usual yellow press kind of excitement because of what it looked like instead of what it said." During the press tour for the Glass Spider Tour, he was asked about the controversy and responded, "We asked the [Los Angeles] police to work with us and they did very happily. We wanted to indicate how some of the houses for the homeless are removed, so we asked them to bring along the kind of contraption they use [...] it's kind of like a tank with a big battering ram on the end of it. And on the end of the battering ram they've made a little joke. As it goes through the windows it goes 'Have a nice day.' And I pointed out that it would be in the video and they said they were only too pleased to keep it on, so they kept it on. Is that controversial? I don't know." The video was nominated for a 1987 MTV Video Music award in the category "Best Male Video", but lost to Peter Gabriel's clip for "Sledgehammer" (1986).

== Track listing ==
All lyrics written by Bowie, while remixes produced by Shep Pettibone, except for the "Groucho" mix, which was remixed by Paul "Groucho" Smykle. A limited edition release (EAX 230) of the second 7" single issued in the United Kingdom contained a 7" red vinyl disc in a numbered box with a set of stickers and a photo booklet. The video EP is the sole source of the unedited version of the "Day-In Day-Out" and "Loving the Alien" videos. While the latter includes a shot of Bowie with a nosebleed, the edited versions of both visuals appear in later video releases.

- UK 7" single
1. "Day-In Day-Out" (Single edit) – 4:14
2. "Julie" – 3:40
- UK & worldwide 12" single 1
1. "Day-In Day-Out" (Extended Dance Mix) – 7:15
2. "Day-In Day-Out" (Extended Dub Mix) – 7:17
3. "Julie" – 3:40
- UK & worldwide 12" single 2
1. "Day-In Day-Out" (Remix [aka Groucho Mix]) – 6:30
2. "Day-In Day-Out" (Extended Dub Mix) – 7:17
3. "Julie" – 3:40
- US 12" single
1. "Day-In Day-Out" (Groucho Mix [aka Remix]) – 6:30
2. "Day-In Day-Out" (Extended Dance Mix) – 7:15
3. "Day-In Day-Out" (Single edit) – 4:14
4. "Julie" – 3:40
- US 12" promo single
1. "Day-In Day-Out" (7" Dance Edit) – 3:35
2. "Day-In Day-Out" (Extended Dance Mix) – 7:15
3. "Day-In Day-Out" (Edited Dance Mix) – 4:30
- Video EP
1. "Day-In Day-Out" (video) – 6:44
2. "Loving the Alien" (video) – 4:45
3. "Day-In Day-Out" (Extended Dance Version) (video) – 7:15
- UK digital download (2007)
1. "Al Alba" [aka Spanish Language version of Day-In Day-Out) – 5:37
2. "Julie" – 3:40
3. "Day-In Day-Out" (Extended Dance Mix) – 7:15
4. "Day-In Day-Out" (Extended Dub Mix) – 7:17
5. "Day-In Day-Out" (12" Groucho Mix) – 6:29

== Credits and personnel ==
Credits adapted from the liner notes of Never Let Me Down.

- David Bowie – vocals, composer, producer
- David Richards – producer
- Carlos Alomar – guitar
- Sid McGinnis – guitar
- Erdal Kizilcay – bass guitar, drums, keyboards
- Robin Clark – backing vocals
- Diva Gray – backing vocals
- Loni Groves – backing vocals

== Charts ==
=== Weekly charts ===
Chart (1987)	Peak position
Australia (Kent Music Report)	33
Austria (Ö3 Austria Top 40)	25
Belgium (Ultratop 50 Flanders)	10
Canada (RPM (magazine))	16
Finland (Suomen virallinen lista)	6
France (IFOP)	15
Ireland (IRMA)	12
Israel (Israeli Singles Chart)	8
Italy (Musica e dischi)	9
Italy Airplay (Music & Media)	5
Netherlands (Dutch Top 40)	14
Netherlands (Single Top 100)	15
New Zealand (Recorded Music NZ)	12
Sweden (Sverigetopplistan)	5
Spain (AFYVE)	14
Switzerland (Schweizer Hitparade)	28
UK Singles (Official Charts)	17
US Billboard Hot 100	21
US Dance Club Songs (Billboard)	10
US Mainstream Rock Airplay (Billboard)	3
West Germany (GfK)	25

=== Year-end charts ===
Chart (1987)	Position
Belgium (Ultratop Flanders)	94
Netherlands (Dutch Top 40)	92

== Bibliography ==
- Clerc, Benoît (2021). David Bowie All the Songs: The Story Behind Every Track. New York City: Black Dog & Leventhal. ISBN 978-0-7624-7471-4.
- Pegg, Nicholas (2016). The Complete David Bowie (Revised and Updated ed.). London: Titan Books. ISBN 978-1-78565-365-0.
