= ISelect =

iSelect

Compilation album by David Bowie
- Released: 29 June 2008
- Recorded: 1971–1987, 2008
- Genre: Rock
- Length: 57:41
- Label: EMI
- Producer: Various

David Bowie chronology
| Live Santa Monica '72 (2008) | iSelect (2008) | VH1 Storytellers (2009) |

David Bowie compilation chronology
| The Best of David Bowie 1980/1987 (2007) | iSelect (2008) | Nothing Has Changed (2014) |

Professional ratings
Review scores
| Source | Rating |
|---|---|
| AllMusic | 3/5 stars |
| PopMatters | 7/10 stars |

iSelect (or iSelectBowie) is a compilation album by English musician David Bowie that was first released 29 June 2008 in the United Kingdom and Ireland. The title was released in the United States by Astralwerks Records. The songs were chosen for the compilation by Bowie himself. The CD was available exclusively as a free gift with the 29 June edition of British newspaper The Mail on Sunday.

The selection includes several album tracks, with only three singles ("Life on Mars?", "Loving the Alien" and "Time Will Crawl"). In addition, the version of "Time Will Crawl" included on the album is a remix by engineer Mario J. McNulty, featuring several newly recorded parts in an effort to revisit some of the material Bowie had released as part of Never Let Me Down, an album with which he was disappointed.

It is the only release to contain the track "Some Are" which has been unavailable since the mid-1990s deletion of the 1991 edition of Bowie's 1977 album Low on which it was included as a bonus track. It also features the medley of "Sweet Thing" and "Candidate", and the reprise of "Sweet Thing" as a single track, rather than being split up by song as it has been released on previous CD versions of Diamond Dogs.

It also includes a teaser track combining the "Intro" track and "Hang On to Yourself" from Live Santa Monica '72, an official rerelease of the bootleg album Santa Monica '72.

== Commercial release ==
Virgin/EMI released the CD in the U.S. and Canada on 14 October 2008. It is identical to the one released by The Mail on Sunday except it comes in a standard jewel case and the booklet contains the song-by-song comments that were published in the newspaper. It has also been released as a digital download on iTunes.

A limited red vinyl version was released in March 2015 to celebrate the opening of David Bowie Is exhibition in Philharmonie de Paris, France.

== Reception ==
Writing for PopMatters, Mike Schiller called iSelect "actually something special, in that Bowie picked the tracklist himself. Even more than that, the tracklist actually looks like something he'd have picked himself, rather than having a manager or publicist pick it for him." He remarked that "these are by no means Bowie's most memorable melodies, and some of them can be particularly off-putting", but concluded that "more than anything, you're getting a look into Bowie's mind — the mere fact that Bowie holds these tracks in high regard may just be enough to cause you to hear them in a way you've never heard them before." Writing for AllMusic, Jason Lymangrover commented that Bowie fans "will probably appreciate the new revamped version of 'Time Will Crawl' from Never Let Me Down with live drums and strings, and the unreleased 'Some Are', an outtake from the Low sessions with Brian Eno. Newcomers who have already perused the greatest-hits collections may find this a worthy stepping stone before getting lost in his lengthy discography."

== Track listing ==
All tracks written by David Bowie, except where noted.

| No. | Title | Album | Length |
|---|---|---|---|
| 1. | "Life on Mars?" | Hunky Dory (1971) | 3:49 |
| 2. | "Sweet Thing/Candidate/Sweet Thing (Reprise)" | Diamond Dogs (1974) | 8:47 |
| 3. | "The Bewlay Brothers" | Hunky Dory | 5:23 |
| 4. | "Lady Grinning Soul" | Aladdin Sane (1973) | 3:51 |
| 5. | "Win" | Young Americans (1975) | 4:44 |
| 6. | "Some Are" (Bowie, Brian Eno) | Bonus track on the 1991 re-issue of Low (1977) | 3:13 |
| 7. | "Teenage Wildlife" | Scary Monsters (and Super Creeps) (1980) | 6:51 |
| 8. | "Repetition" | Lodger (1979) | 3:01 |
| 9. | "Fantastic Voyage" (Bowie, Brian Eno) | Lodger | 2:54 |
| 10. | "Loving the Alien" | Tonight (1984) | 7:08 |
| 11. | "Time Will Crawl" (MM remix; contains 30 seconds of silence at the end of the track) | Original version on Never Let Me Down (1987) | 4:54 |
| 12. | "Hang On to Yourself" (Live) | Live Santa Monica '72 (2008); originally from The Rise and Fall of Ziggy Stardust and the Spiders from Mars (1972) | 3:06 |
