= When the Wind Blows (song) =

1986 song by David Bowie

Single by David Bowie

from the album When the Wind Blows soundtrack
- B-side: "When the Wind Blows (Instrumental)"
- Released: 27 October 1986
- Recorded: 1986
- Genre: Hard rock
- Length: 3:32
- Label: Virgin Records
- Songwriters: David Bowie; Erdal Kızılçay
- Producers: David Bowie; David Richards

David Bowie singles chronology
"Underground" (1986)	"When the Wind Blows" (1986)	"Magic Dance" (1987)

"When the Wind Blows" is a 1986 song from the soundtrack of the film of the same name, performed by David Bowie and written by Bowie and Erdal Kızılçay. It was released as a single in October 1986 and released digitally in 2007.

== Background and recording ==
Originally, Bowie had intended to write the entire soundtrack for the movie, but after pressure to produce his own original album mounted (he would release Never Let Me Down in 1987), he instead pulled out of the project and only submitted the title track; Pink Floyd alum Roger Waters provided much of the original music for the soundtrack instead. "When the Wind Blows" marked the second contribution from Bowie to a film based on a Raymond Briggs book – he contributed a filmed introduction to The Snowman in 1982. Bowie's song was the result of a collaboration with multi-instrumentalist Erdal Kızılçay, who would work with Bowie for another 10 years on such projects as Never Let Me Down (1987), The Buddha of Suburbia (1993), and Outside (1995).

== Reception ==
The single peaked at UK No. 44, promoted by a video that featured a montage of clips from the film, with Bowie's animated face overlaid. Bowie biographer Nicholas Pegg said that it was a "mystery why this splendidly melodramatic number ... didn't achieve greater chart success."

== Other releases ==
The single release appeared on Never Let Me Down (1995 reissue), in some regions on Best of Bowie (2002), The Platinum Collection (2005), The Best of David Bowie 1980-1987 (2005/2007), which also includes the music video, and Re:Call 4 from the Loving the Alien (1983–1988) box set (2018).

== Track listing ==
Lyrics by David Bowie, music by Bowie and Erdal Kızılçay.

=== 7": Virgin / VS 906 (UK) / VSS 906 (UK) ===
1. "When the Wind Blows" – 3:32
2. "When the Wind Blows" (instrumental) – 3:52

=== 12": Virgin / VS 906-12 (UK) ===
1. "When the Wind Blows" (extended mix) – 5:46
2. "When the Wind Blows" (instrumental) – 3:52

=== Digital download – 2007 EMI UK (When the Wind Blows EP by David Bowie) ===
1. "When the Wind Blows" (2002 remaster) – 3:34
2. "When the Wind Blows" (extended mix) – 5:36
3. "When the Wind Blows" (instrumental) – 3:46

== Personnel ==
- David Bowie – vocals, production
- Erdal Kızılçay - other instruments
- David Richards – production

== Charts ==
Chart (1986)	Peak position
Finland (Suomen virallinen lista)	17
Ireland (IRMA)	19
Netherlands (Single Top 100)	50
UK Singles (OCC)	44

== Bibliography ==
- Pegg, Nicholas (2016). The Complete David Bowie (revised and updated ed.). London: Titan Books. ISBN 978-1-78565-365-0.
- O'Leary, Chris (2019). Ashes to Ashes: The Songs of David Bowie 1976–2016. London: Repeater. ISBN 978-1912248308.
