= Blue Jean =

Song by David Bowie

Single by David Bowie

from the album Tonight
- B-side: "Dancing with the Big Boys"
- Released: 10 September 1984
- Recorded: May 1984
- Studio: Le Studio, Morin-Heights, Quebec, Canada
- Genre: Pop; rock and roll
- Length: 3:08
- Label: EMI America – EA181
- Songwriter: David Bowie
- Producers: David Bowie; Derek Bramble; Hugh Padgham

David Bowie singles chronology
"White Light/White Heat" (1983)	"Blue Jean" (1984)	"Tonight" (1984)

Alternative cover

Music video
- "Blue Jean" on YouTube

"Blue Jean" is a song written and recorded by the English singer-songwriter David Bowie for his sixteenth studio album Tonight (1984). One of only two tracks on the album to be written entirely by Bowie, it was released as a single ahead of the album and charted in the United States, peaking at No. 8, becoming his 5th and last top 10 hit with no features. The song is loosely inspired by Eddie Cochran.

== Composition and reception ==
Interviewed in 1987 and asked to compare a track like "Time Will Crawl" to "Blue Jean," Bowie said "'Blue Jean' is a piece of sexist rock 'n roll. [laughs] It's about picking up birds. It's not very cerebral, that piece." BBC reviewer Chris Jones criticised the song in his appraisal of Best of Bowie in 2002, arguing "'Blue Jean' barely exists, so formulaic is it." More positively, rock commentator Chris O'Leary, while locating "Blue Jean" firmly "in the pastiche lane," has described the song as "clever" and "catchy" and one of Bowie's "best second-rate hits."

Cash Box said that it "features the dynamics of classic Bowie which range from the smooth and sultry verse to the exploding chorus."

== Promotion ==
Following the commercial success of Bowie's previous album, Let's Dance, its singles and the Serious Moonlight Tour, "Blue Jean" was launched with a 21-minute short film, Jazzin' for Blue Jean, directed by Julien Temple. The song performance segment from this was also used as a more conventional music video. The film won the 1985 Grammy Award for "Best Video, Short Form", later renamed "Best Music Video", which proved to be the only competitive Grammy Award Bowie won during his lifetime for over three decades, although Bowie posthumously won four Grammys for his album Blackstar (2016).

Two shorter promotional videos of "Blue Jean" also exist: a three-minute version edited from the full Jazzin' for Blue Jean video and an alternate version recorded for MTV in England that has no relation to the other videos. Both of these videos, plus the original Jazzin' for Blue Jean, are available on the DVD release of Best of Bowie (2002).

== Live performances ==
"Blue Jean" was part of Bowie's live repertoire for the rest of his career, being performed on his Glass Spider Tour (1987), released on the Glass Spider DVD and CD in 1988, the 1990 Sound+Vision Tour and his 2004 A Reality Tour.

== Other releases ==
"Blue Jean" has appeared on a variety of compilation albums, including Changesbowie (1990), The Singles Collection (1993), Best of Bowie (2002), The Platinum Collection (2005), The Best of David Bowie 1980/1987 (2007), Nothing Has Changed (2014) (3-CD and 2-CD editions), and Bowie Legacy (2016) (2-CD edition). A remastered version of the song was released on Loving the Alien (1983–1988) (2018).

== Track listing ==
=== 7": EMI America / EA 181 (UK) ===
1. "Blue Jean" – 3:08
2. "Dancing with the Big Boys" – 3:32
- Some versions of the 7" single were released on blue vinyl

=== 12": EMI America / 12EA 181 (UK) ===
1. "Blue Jean" (Extended Dance Mix) – 5:15
2. "Dancing with the Big Boys" (Extended Dance Mix) – 7:28
3. "Dancing with the Big Boys" (Extended Dub Mix) – 7:15
- "Blue Jean" (Extended Dance Mix) remixed by John "Jellybean" Benitez at Sigma Sound – NYC – Engineer: Jay Mark.
- "Dancing with the Big Boys" remixes produced by Arthur Baker.

== Personnel ==
- David Bowie – vocals
- Carlos Alomar – guitar
- Carmine Rojas – bass guitar; keyboards
- Omar Hakim – drums
- Lenny Pickett – tenor saxophone; bass clarinet
- Stanley Harrison – alto saxophone
- Steve Elson – baritone saxophone
- Guy St. Onge – marimba
- Curtis King – vocals
- George Simms – vocals
- Robin Clark – vocals
- Sammy Figueroa – percussion

Production

- David Bowie – producer
- Derek Bramble – producer
- Hugh Padgham – producer

== Charts ==
Chart (1984–1985)	Peak position
Australian Kent Report Singles Chart	12
Austria (Ö3 Austria Top 40)	16
Belgium (Ultratop 50 Flanders)	4
Canadian Singles Chart	6
Finland (Suomen virallinen lista)	11
France (SNEP)	22
Germany (GfK)	21
Guatemala (UPI)	8
Ireland (IRMA)	3
Israel (Israeli Singles Chart)	1
Netherlands (Dutch Top 40)	10
Netherlands (Single Top 100)	10
New Zealand (Recorded Music NZ)	7
Norway (VG-lista)	3
Spain (AFYVE)	3
Spain (Los 40 Principales)	1
Sweden (Sverigetopplistan)	5
Switzerland (Schweizer Hitparade)	14
UK Singles (Official Charts)	6
US Billboard Hot 100	8
US Dance Club Songs (Billboard)	2
US Mainstream Rock (Billboard)	2

== Certifications ==
Country/Region	Sales	Certification
Canada	>40,000	Gold
