= Bowie – The Video Collection =

Video by David Bowie
- Released: 1993
- Label: Rykovision

David Bowie chronology
Glass Spider (1988)	Bowie – The Video Collection (1993)	Black Tie White Noise (1993)

Bowie – The Video Collection is a video album by David Bowie, released in 1993. It included most official music videos made by Bowie between 1972 and 1990.

== Release and reception ==
This video collection was released as a tie-in to the audio release of Bowie's The Singles Collection, released at the same time and with similar packaging. The release was hailed by Q magazine at the time as "the greatest video collection ever seen" and contained most, but not all of, Bowie's official videos released between 1972 and 1990. It did not include any videos from Bowie's time with Tin Machine, nor did it include any of the videos from his album Black Tie White Noise video collection, which had been released only a few months prior, Real Cool World, which was the soundtrack to the film Cool World, was also not included. It also does not include Under Pressure in collaboration with Queen and This is Not America in collaboration with the Pat Metheny Group, which was the soundtrack for the film The Falcon and the Snowman. Notable video inclusions on this release were the videos for "As the World Falls Down" and "Never Let Me Down", which until this compilation, had not previously been officially released.

== Track listing ==
All tracks were written by David Bowie, except where noted, and include the year the video was originally made.

1. "Space Oddity" (David Bowie, December 1972)
2. "John I'm Only Dancing" (non-album single, September 1972)
3. "The Jean Genie" (Aladdin Sane, November 1972)
4. "Life on Mars?" (Hunky Dory, June 1973)
5. "Be My Wife" (Low, June 1977)
6. ""Heroes"" (Bowie, Brian Eno) ("Heroes", September 1977)
7. "Boys Keep Swinging" (Bowie, Eno) (Lodger, April 1979)
8. "Look Back in Anger" (Bowie, Eno) (Lodger, August 1979)
9. "D.J." (Bowie, Eno, Carlos Alomar) (Lodger, June 1979)
10. "Ashes to Ashes" (Scary Monsters (And Super Creeps), August 1980)
11. "Fashion" (Scary Monsters (And Super Creeps), October 1980)
12. "Wild Is the Wind" (Washington, Tiomkin) (Station to Station, November 1981)
13. "Let's Dance" (Let's Dance, March 1983)
14. "China Girl" (Bowie, Iggy Pop) (censored version) (Let's Dance, May 1983)
15. "Modern Love" (Let's Dance, September 1983)
16. "Blue Jean" (short version) (Tonight, September 1984)
17. "Loving the Alien" (censored version) (Tonight, May 1985)
18. "Dancing in the Street" (Hunter, Stevenson, Gaye) (non-album single, August 1985)
19. "Absolute Beginners" (Absolute Beginners, March 1986)
20. "Underground" (Labyrinth, June 1986)
21. "As the World Falls Down" (previously unreleased until this compilation) (Labyrinth, December 1986)
22. "Day-In Day-Out" (censored version) (Never Let Me Down, March 1987)
23. "Time Will Crawl" (Never Let Me Down, June 1987)
24. "Never Let Me Down" (Bowie, Alomar) (previously unreleased until this compilation) (Never Let Me Down, August 1987)
25. "Fame '90" (Bowie, John Lennon, Alomar) (Changesbowie, March 1990)
