= Loving the Alien =

Song by David Bowie

Single by David Bowie

from the album Tonight
- B-side: "Don't Look Down"
- Released: 20 May 1985
- Recorded: May–June 1984
- Studio: Le Studio (Morin-Heights, Canada)
- Length: 7:11 (album version); 4:43 (single remix)
- Label: EMI America – EA195
- Songwriter: David Bowie
- Producers: David Bowie; Derek Bramble; Hugh Padgham

David Bowie singles chronology
"This Is Not America" (1985)	"Loving the Alien" (1985)	"Dancing in the Street" (1985)

Music video
- "Loving the Alien" on YouTube

"Loving the Alien" is a song by the English singer David Bowie. It was the opening track to his sixteenth studio album Tonight (1984). One of two tracks on the album written solely by Bowie, an edited version of the song was released as a single in May 1985, nine months after the release of lead single "Blue Jean" and eight months after the album's release. "Loving the Alien" peaked at number 19 on the UK Singles Chart. "Loving the Alien" inspired the title of Christopher Sandford's 1997 biography of Bowie and the 2018 Bowie box set release, Loving the Alien (1983–1988).

== Background and recording ==
"Loving the Alien" was one of two tracks on the Tonight album written solely by Bowie. Reportedly influenced by Donovan Joyce's book The Jesus Scroll, lyrically the song features Bowie critiquing religious violence throughout history. As a demo, the song was titled "1". The singer said the track "...came about because of my feeling that so much history is wrong – as is being rediscovered all the time – and that we base so much on the wrong knowledge that we've gleaned." He recorded a demo in Montreux, Switzerland, before recording the song for the album. Bowie later said that the production on the song undid the power of the lyric, saying he preferred the demo version, and in a separate interview lamented "You should hear 'Loving the Alien' on demo. It's wonderful on demo. I promise you! (laughs). But on the album, it's ... not as wonderful."

The song was recorded during the sessions for Tonight at Le Studio in Morin-Heights, Canada, between May and June 1984. The song was co-produced by Bowie, Derek Bramble and Hugh Padgham. Musicians who played on the song included Bowie's regular collaborator Carlos Alomar on guitar, Omar Hakim on drums, Carmine Rojas on bass, Sammy Figueroa on percussion, Mark Pender on trumpet and Guy St Onge on marimba. The string arrangement was composed by the producer Arif Mardin. Like the recording sessions for his previous album Let's Dance (1983), Bowie played no instruments, and he delegated almost all responsibility for the music to the musicians, only occasionally offering critical input.

== Music and lyrics ==
In his book The Word and Music of David Bowie, the author James E. Perone described the music as fitting within the "plastic soul" stylings of his 1975 album Young Americans, albeit one that resembles R&B rather than soul. He described some of the lyrics as ageing well into the 20th century, particularly the references to "Palestine a modern problem" and "Terror in a best laid plan". Bowie's biographer Nicholas Pegg describes the marimba line as representative of the Tonight album embracing world music. Bowie himself said that the "ah-ah-ah" backing vocals were taken from Philip Glass's opera Einstein on the Beach (1976). Pegg said they were reminiscent of Laurie Anderson's song "O Superman" (1981).

== Release ==
"Loving the Alien" was first released on the Tonight album as the opening track on 24 September 1984, with a length of 7:11. A remixed version by Steve Thompson and Michael Barbiero, with a length of 4:43, was released as a single in May 1985, nine months after the release of lead single "Blue Jean" and eight months after the release of the album. The single's B-side, "Don't Look Down", a cover of Iggy Pop's song and included on Tonight, are remixed on both the 7" and 12" single release. Bowie reportedly decided to release the song as a single after reading a review of the Tonight album that suggested the song could be a hit. It performed moderately on the UK Singles Chart, reaching number 19.

Several seconds of video showing Bowie with a nosebleed were removed from all official releases of the video after 1987

An accompanying music video was co-directed by Bowie and David Mallet. The video features Bowie performing the song on an M. C. Escher-like set with two exotic-dressed backing musicians. The original video included a short shot of Bowie with a nosebleed; this original version was only released on the 1987 video single "Day-In Day-Out", and all subsequent releases of the video have the nosebleed scene edited out.

== Critical reception ==
Many critics have highlighted "Loving the Alien" and "Blue Jean" as the standouts of the Tonight album. (Note: Attributed to multiple references:) Yo Zushi of the New Statesman described the song as a "seven-minute masterpiece". Thomas Inskeep of Stylus Magazine called "Loving the Alien" one of the most downright pretty songs" in Bowie's catalogue, praising the production as "gorgeously evocative" and felt it complemented Bowie's lyrics and vocals. While critical of much of Bowie's 1980s output in his appraisal of Best of Bowie in 2002, BBC reviewer Chris Jones stated: "Loving the Alien does have a strange, distant beauty to it. Like watching a ballet through a telescope."

Bowie's biographers have given the song mixed reviews. David Buckley called it "the only track on the [Tonight] album with the gravitas of much of [Bowie's] earlier work". Perone believed that, despite a "promising chorus hook", the music of the verses was not memorable. He also felt that Arif Marden's string arrangement created a mellow atmosphere that made the edgier lyrics lose their impact in translation. Pegg agreed, saying that the song is a "terrific piece of songwriting" that gets "dragged from the heights by insipid, over-elaborate production". Christopher Sandford said the song contains one of Bowie's best lyrics, and Chris O'Leary described it as "a would-be masterpiece that aimed for the heights of 'Station to Station' and missed".

== Live performances ==
Bowie performed "Loving the Alien" every night of his 1987 Glass Spider Tour, released on home video as Glass Spider in 1988. The song was not performed until the Tibet House Benefit Concert on 28 February 2003, this time as a stripped-down version with only Bowie on vocals and Gerry Leonard on guitar. Bowie and Leonard continued performing the song in this arrangement throughout the 2003–2004 A Reality Tour. A live performance from this tour, recorded in November 2003, was included on both a concert video (2004) and live album (2010). Leonard later kept performing the song live under the solo stage name Spooky Ghost.

== Other releases ==
The song "Loving the Alien" appears on several Bowie compilation albums, including Bowie: The Singles 1969–1993 (1993), some versions of Best of Bowie (2002), Sound + Vision (2003 and 2014 reissues), The Platinum Collection (2005), The Best of David Bowie 1980/1987 (2007), iSelect (2008), and Nothing Has Changed (3-CD version) (2014). The original album version, most of its remixes and B-sides all appear on the 2018 box set Loving the Alien (1983–1988), which took its name from the song.

The original uncensored video for "Loving the Alien" appears on the "Day-In Day-Out" video EP (1987), and the censored version appears on DVD releases of Bowie – The Video Collection (1993), Best of Bowie (2002) and The Best of David Bowie 1980/1987 (2007).

In 2002, Dutch-American producer the Scumfrog made a club mix of the song and released it as a single together with the original video of the song. The Scumfrog version of "Loving the Alien" reached number 41 in the UK that year. It also reached number 9 on the UK Dance Singles Chart.

Steve Strange covered this song with his band Visage for the posthumous album Demons to Diamonds in 2015. Strange had previously appeared in the music video for Bowie's song "Ashes to Ashes" (1980).

== Track listing ==
=== 7": EMI America / EA 195 / EAP 195 (UK) ===
1. "Loving the Alien" (Re-mixed version) (David Bowie) – 4:43
2. "Don't Look Down" (Re-mixed version) (Iggy Pop, James Williamson) – 4:04

=== 12": EMI America SEAV-7860 / 12EA 195 / 12EAP 195 (UK) ===
1. "Loving the Alien" (Extended Dance Mix) (Bowie) – 7:27
2. "Don't Look Down" (Extended Dance Mix) (Pop, Williamson) – 4:50
3. "Loving the Alien" (Extended Dub Mix) (Bowie) – 7:14
- Re-mixed by Steve Thompson and Michael Barbiero.

=== Download: EMI / iEA 195 (UK) ===
1. "Loving the Alien" (Re-mixed version) (Bowie) – 4:43
2. "Don't Look Down" (Re-mixed version) (Pop, Williamson) – 4:04
3. "Loving the Alien" (Extended Dance Mix) (Bowie) – 7:27
4. "Loving the Alien" (Extended Dub Mix) (Bowie) – 7:14
5. "Don't Look Down" (Extended Dance Mix) (Pop, Williamson) – 4:50
- Released in 2007

== Personnel ==
According to Chris O'Leary and Benoît Clerc:

- David Bowie – lead and backing vocals
- Carlos Alomar – guitar
- Derek Bramble – bass, guitar, synthesisers
- Omar Hakim – drums
- Carmine Rojas – bass
- Rob Yale – Fairlight CMI synthesiser
- Guy St Onge – marimba
- Sam Figueroa – percussion
- Robin Clark – backing vocals
- George Simms – backing vocals
- Curtis King – backing vocals
- Stanley Harrison – alto saxophone
- Lenny Pickett – tenor saxophone
- Steve Elson – baritone saxophone
- Mark Pender – trumpet
- Unknown musicians – strings (arranged by Arif Mardin)

Technical

- David Bowie – producer
- Derek Bramble – producer
- Hugh Padgham – producer, engineer

== Charts ==
Chart (1985)	Peak position
Australia (Kent Music Report)	65
Belgium (Ultratop 50 Flanders)	14
Ireland (IRMA)	5
Netherlands (Dutch Top 40)	25
Netherlands (Single Top 100)	25
New Zealand (Recorded Music NZ)	35
UK Singles (Official Charts)	19
West Germany (GfK)	27

== Cover versions ==
"Loving the Alien" has been covered by several other artists. These include:

- Iva Davies & Icehouse – The Berlin Tapes (1995), also included on Diamond Gods: Interpretations of Bowie (2001)
- Peter Frampton Band – Frampton Forgets the Words (2021)
