= Girls (Tina Turner song) =

- 7" and 12" single picture sleeve

Single by Tina Turner

from the album Break Every Rule
- B-side: "Take Me to the River"
- Released: February 2, 1987 (NL)
- Genre: Pop
- Length: 4:56
- Label: Capitol
- Songwriters: David Bowie; Erdal Kizilcay
- Producer: Terry Britten

Tina Turner singles chronology
| "Two People" (1986) | "Girls" (1987) | "What You Get Is What You See" (1986) |

"Girls" is a song written by David Bowie and Erdal Kızılçay and originally recorded by Tina Turner for her 1986 album Break Every Rule. It was released as a single in the Netherlands, where it reached No. 19 on the Singles Charts. Bowie recorded his own studio version of the track during his 1987 Never Let Me Down recording sessions, and released the track as the B-side to his 1987 single "Time Will Crawl".

== Writing ==
David Bowie and his 1980's–1990's collaborator Erdal Kizilcay wrote the song together at sessions in Montreux, Switzerland, where Bowie lived at the time. Described as "straightforward and meant for pop-radio airplay", Bowie offered it to Tina Turner for inclusion on her album Break Every Rule, which is how the song was released first. When Bowie was preparing his 1987 album Never Let Me Down, he briefly included "Girls" in the album's running order, before relegating it as a B-side to his 1987 single, "Time Will Crawl".

== Tina Turner version ==
Turner's version was produced by Terry Britten. It was released as a single in 1986. Tina Turner released a live version of the song on her album Tina Live in Europe (1988).

== David Bowie version ==
Bowie recorded his own version of the song in late 1986 during the Never Let Me Down sessions, including one track with vocals sung in English and another with vocals sung in Japanese. After deciding not to include the track on the album itself, versions appeared as B-sides for different formats of the "Time Will Crawl" single in June 1987; the "extended edit" of the English-language song also appeared as a bonus track on the 1995 Virgin Records reissue of Never Let Me Down, and later on the box set Loving the Alien (1983-1988).

=== Critical reception ===
The song was critiqued by Bowie biographer Nicholas Pegg, who, though he considered it better than some of the lesser tracks on the album, found that it "[degenerated] into a standard Never Let Me Down sax-and-guitar romp". Pegg noted influences on the lyrics and musical composition of "Girls" that include Bowie's earlier work "Andy Warhol", Ennio Morricone's "Chi Mai" and even the sci-fi movie Blade Runner (1982).

== Charts ==
| Chart | Peak position |
|---|---|
| Netherlands (Dutch Top 40) | 16 |
| Netherlands (Single Top 100) | 19 |
