= Never Let Me Down (David Bowie song) =

Song by David Bowie

Single by David Bowie

from the album Never Let Me Down
- B-side: "'87 and Cry"
- Released: 17 August 1987
- Recorded: December 1986
- Studio: Power Station (New York City)
- Length: 3:58
- Label: EMI
- Songwriters: David Bowie; Carlos Alomar
- Producers: Bowie; David Richards

David Bowie singles chronology
"Time Will Crawl" (1987)	"Never Let Me Down" (1987)	"Under the God" (1989)

Music video
- "Never Let Me Down" on YouTube

"Never Let Me Down" is a song recorded by the English singer David Bowie, serving as the title track for his seventeenth studio album Never Let Me Down (1987). It was released as the third and final single from the record in 1987 and served as his last original solo single until 1992's "Real Cool World"; a remix of "Fame" was released in 1990. "Never Let Me Down" was a writing collaboration between the artist himself and Carlos Alomar, while production was handled by Bowie along with David Richards. The lyrics are about Bowie's relationship with his longtime personal assistant, Coco Schwab.

An accompanying music video for the single was shot by French director Jean-Baptiste Mondino and received positive response from critics. Commercially, "Never Let Me Down" reached number 27 on the Billboard Hot 100 and number 34 on the UK singles chart. It was aided by a CD release, Bowie's first, and remained the singer's last single to chart within the top 40 in the United States until "Lazarus" (2015).

== Background and development ==
"Never Let Me Down" was the last track written and recorded for the album, but despite this, Bowie said that the song was "completely finished in twenty-four hours from the beginning of the writing to the end of the arranging". In December 1986, while Bob Clearmountain was mixing the rest of the album tracks at Power Station studios, Bowie found himself with free time and the idea for one more song. Bowie had the chorus in his head, and had started with his own chord structure for the song but wasn't happy with it, calling it "ponderous and funereal." Long time collaborator Carlos Alomar reworked the chords for "Never Let Me Down", using a chord structure from a song he had written on his own called "I'm Tired", and thus received part of the writing credit for the track. Bowie, David Richards and Alomar took an elevator down to Studio A at in the studio and recorded the song using leftover drum tracks from earlier sessions for other tracks for the album; the vocals were finished that evening and before midnight, the tracks was ready for mixing. Said Richards, "It was so exciting to have the two studios going at once, and to have that kind of creativity happening all around us. It's something I will never forget."

The name of the track was originally "Isolation" before Bowie changed it. The singer described the single as a "pivotal" track for himself, calling it the most personal song he had written for an album to that point in his career. The recording is about Bowie's long-time personal assistant, Coco Schwab. Bowie described their relationship, saying "It's platonic. But there is a romance in it, I guess, inasmuch as it's hard for two people to feel totally at ease in each other's company for that period of time and not expect too much from each other. Always being prepared to be there if the other one needs someone, you know? There's not many people you find in life that you can do that with, or feel that way with."

== Release and promotion ==
"Never Let Me Down" was released through EMI in 1987 and was the first Bowie single to be made available on CD, including a newly remixed version. Bowie performed the song on BBC's Top of the Pops on 16 September 1987 and it was aired on the first broadcast of the American version of the show. The track was additionally performed live during his 1987 Glass Spider Tour and included as part of the Glass Spider (1988) concert film. Bowie called his live performance of "Never Let Me Down" on the Glass Spider Tour "abrasive", and, influenced by the minimalist choreography of Pina Bausch, he elaborated that on the tour, "I'm on my knees, with my arms in a kind of straitjacket, [in] a crawl for three-and-a-half minutes. A girl is with me, [...] but she has a cylinder on her back, and every now and then she's giving me oxygen. It felt like a very protective, a very sad little image, and it felt right for the song.

The song was added to several compilation albums, including Bowie: The Singles 1969–1993 (1993) and Best of Bowie (2002). A digital download version of the tracks was made available online in 2007. A re-mastered / re-recorded version of the song, as well as several original remixes of the song, appear on the box set Loving the Alien (1983–1988) (2018).

== Music video ==
Two still images from the video for "Never Let Me Down"

French director Jean-Baptiste Mondino was selected by Bowie to direct an accompanying music video. Regarding this, Bowie said, "It's an experiment; I'm really putting myself in his [Jean-Baptiste's] hands. [...] I think if I did it [the video myself], it would be very abrasive, and I'm not quite sure if that's how I want the song to come off visually. In concert it will be abrasive; it won't have the same quality as the video. But I really think Mondino is a fantastic video maker. He just knows that this is his genre. He's like a craftsman and that's what he's trying to perfect, this craft of making his five minutes work." Actor Joe Dallesandro makes appearances throughout the clip, announcing the dance marathon. A shot from the music video was used to commercialize 7" releases of the single.

The video, described as a dream-like portrayal of a 1950s-style dance marathon, and heavily-influenced by the 1969 film They Shoot Horses, Don't They?, was viewed positively by one critic, who called it "creative and engaging." A review in the Los Angeles Times scores the video "excellent (85/100)" and the newspaper later rated the clip as one of the Top 10 of 1987. Bowie encyclopedist Nicholas Pegg called the video "years ahead of its time", saying that it "beautifully captures the song's dreamlike quality."

== Critical reception ==
Stephen Thomas Erlewine of AllMusic described the song as a "John Lennon homage" and one of Bowie's "most underrated songs". Pegg called the track "among the strongest" from the album due to its "refreshing spontaneity", compared to the overproduction of the rest of the album. Commercially, "Never Let Me Down" was Bowie's last single to chart inside the top 40 of Billboard's Hot 100 until his "Lazarus" (2015) did so in 2016. Additionally, the track peaked at number 34 on the UK Singles Chart.

== Track listing ==
"Never Let Me Down" was written by Bowie and Alomar, and "'87 and Cry" solely by Bowie. A limited edition picture disk (EAP 239) was issued in some territories. All songs were made available as digital downloads in 2007.

- UK 7" single
1. "Never Let Me Down (Single Version)" – 3:58
2. "'87 and Cry (Single Version)" – 3:53
- US 12" Single #1
1. "Never Let Me Down (Extended Dance Mix)" – 7:00
2. "'87 and Cry (Edit)" – 3:53
3. "Never Let Me Down (Dub)" – 3:55
4. "Never Let Me Down (A Cappella)" – 2:03
- US 12" single #2
1. "Never Let Me Down (Extended dance mix)" – 7:00
2. "Never Let Me Down (7" remix edit)" – 3:58
3. "Never Let Me Down (Dub)" – 3:55
4. "Never Let Me Down (A Capella)" – 2:03
5. "Never Let Me Down (Instrumental)" – 4:00
6. "'87 and Cry (Edit)" – 3:53
- Japan CD single
1. "Never Let Me Down (Extended dance mix)" – 7:01
2. "Never Let Me Down (7" remix)" – 3:58
3. "Never Let Me Down (Dub)" – 3:55
4. "Never Let Me Down (A Cappella)" – 2:03
5. "Never Let Me Down (Instrumental)" – 4:00
6. "'87 and Cry (Single version)" – 3:53

== Credits and personnel ==
Credits adapted from the liner notes of Never Let Me Down.

- Carlos Alomar – composer, guitar
- "Crusher" Bennett – percussion
- Spencer Bernard – synthesizers (Note: Additional musicians on the "single version", "Extended Dance Mix", "Dub" and "A Capella" versions.)
- David Bowie – composer, producer, vocals
- David Eiland – alto saxophone
- Steve Hodge – keyboards
- Erdal Kizilcay – bass, drums, keyboards
- David Richards – producer

== Charts ==
Chart (1987)	Peak position
Australia (Kent Music Report)	63
Canada (RPM (magazine))	37
Netherlands (Single Top 100)	70
France (IFOP)	28
Ireland (IRMA)	27
UK Singles (Official Charts)	34
US Billboard Hot 100	27
US Dance Club Songs (Billboard)	17
US Mainstream Rock (Billboard)	15

== Works cited ==
- Clerc, Benoît (2021). David Bowie All the Songs: The Story Behind Every Track. New York City: Black Dog & Leventhal. ISBN 978-0-7624-7471-4.
- Pegg, Nicholas (2016). The Complete David Bowie (Revised and Updated ed.). London: Titan Books. ISBN 978-1-78565-365-0.
