= The Singles Collection (David Bowie album) =

- UK release cover

Compilation album by David Bowie
- Released: 8 November 1993
- Recorded: 1969–1993
- Genre: Rock; glam rock; art rock
- Length: 154:14
- Label: EMI (UK); Rykodisc (US)

David Bowie chronology
The Buddha of Suburbia (1993)	The Singles Collection (1993)	Santa Monica '72 (1994)

David Bowie compilation chronology
Early On (1964–1966) (1991)	The Singles Collection (1993)	Rarestonebowie (1995)

Alternative covers
- Cover of The Singles 1969 to 1993 US release

Alternative cover
- Cover of the Dutch 1997 reissue

Professional ratings
Review scores
Source	Rating
AllMusic	5/5 stars
Calgary Herald	B+
The Encyclopedia of Popular Music	5/5 stars
Music Week	4/5 stars
New Musical Express	9/10
The Rolling Stone Album Guide	5/5 stars
Select	5/5
Spin Alternative Record Guide	9/10

The Singles Collection is a compilation album by the English musician David Bowie, released in 1993 in the UK and (with some changes) as The Singles 1969 to 1993 in the United States. A video companion, Bowie – The Video Collection, was released on VHS at the same time.

== Release ==
Released in late 1993, this "singles" collection included some tracks that were never officially released as singles (such as "Ziggy Stardust"). This release marked the first time some 7"/single edits were available on CD, and included some unusual or rare versions, such as the shortened mixes of "TVC 15", "Space Oddity" and "Loving the Alien". The US release included the full-length original version of Bowie's "Cat People (Putting Out Fire)" and the 4:01 remix of "Under Pressure" from Classic Queen, while the UK version instead includes a 3:58 edit originally found on Queen's Greatest Hits II.

The first 40,000 copies of the US CD release included a third disc containing a single track, "Peace on Earth/Little Drummer Boy", a duet by Bowie and Bing Crosby taken from Bing's 1977 Christmas television special.

In Australia, the two discs were released separately, as The Singles Collection 1 and The Singles Collection 2.

== Track listing ==
All songs written by David Bowie except where noted.

=== UK version ===
(*) = not on the U.S. version

Disc one
No.	Title	Writer(s)	Place of Origin	Length
1.	"Space Oddity"		David Bowie, 1969	5:15
2.	"Changes"		Hunky Dory, 1971	3:35
3.	"Starman"		The Rise and Fall of Ziggy Stardust and the Spiders from Mars, 1972	4:18
4.	"Ziggy Stardust"		The Rise and Fall of Ziggy Stardust and the Spiders from Mars	3:14
5.	"Suffragette City"		The Rise and Fall of Ziggy Stardust and the Spiders from Mars	3:26
6.	"John, I'm Only Dancing"		Non-album single, 1972	2:47
7.	"The Jean Genie"		Aladdin Sane, 1973	4:07
8.	"Drive-In Saturday"		Aladdin Sane	4:30
9.	"Life on Mars?"		Hunky Dory; released as a single in 1973	3:51
10.	"Sorrow"	Bob Feldman, Jerry Goldstein, Richard Gottehrer	Pin Ups, 1973; originally by The McCoys in 1965 and made famous by The Merseys the following year	2:54
11.	"Rebel Rebel"		Diamond Dogs	4:30
12.	"Rock 'n' Roll Suicide" (*)		The Rise and Fall of Ziggy Stardust and the Spiders from Mars; released as a single in 1974	2:58
13.	"Diamond Dogs"		Diamond Dogs	6:04
14.	"Knock on Wood" (*) (Live)	Eddie Floyd, Steve Cropper	David Live, 1974; originally by Eddie Floyd from Knock on Wood, 1966	3:03
15.	"Young Americans"		Young Americans, 1975	5:11
16.	"Fame"	Bowie, Carlos Alomar, John Lennon	Young Americans	4:14
17.	"Golden Years"		Station to Station, 1976; released as a single the previous year	4:00
18.	"TVC 15"		Station to Station	5:31
19.	"Sound and Vision"		Low, 1977	3:02

Disc two
No.	Title	Writer(s)	Place of Origin	Length
1.	""Heroes"" (Single edit)	Bowie, Brian Eno	"Heroes", 1977	3:37
2.	"Beauty and the Beast"		"Heroes"	3:33
3.	"Boys Keep Swinging"	Bowie, Eno	Lodger, 1979	3:17
4.	"DJ"	Bowie, Eno, Alomar	Lodger	4:00
5.	"Alabama Song" (*)	Bertolt Brecht, Kurt Weill	Non-album single, 1980	3:51
6.	"Ashes to Ashes"		Scary Monsters (And Super Creeps), 1980	4:24
7.	"Fashion"		Scary Monsters (And Super Creeps)	4:47
8.	"Scary Monsters (And Super Creeps)"		Scary Monsters (And Super Creeps)	5:11
9.	"Under Pressure" (Edited version; with Queen)	Bowie, Freddie Mercury, Brian May, John Deacon, Roger Taylor	Non-album single, 1981; later included on the Queen album Hot Space the following year	3:57
10.	"Wild Is the Wind" (*)	Dimitri Tiomkin, Ned Washington	Station to Station; originally by Johnny Mathis for the film of the same name, 1957; released as a single in 1981 in support of the Changestwobowie compilation album	6:01
11.	"Let's Dance" (Single edit)		Let's Dance, 1983	4:07
12.	"China Girl" (Single edit)	Bowie, Jim Osterburg (a.k.a. Iggy Pop)	Let's Dance; originally by Iggy Pop from The Idiot, 1977	4:16
13.	"Modern Love" (Single edit)		Let's Dance	3:56
14.	"Blue Jean"		Tonight, 1984	3:11
15.	"This Is Not America" (*) (with the Pat Metheny Group)	Bowie, Pat Metheny, Lyle Mays	The Falcon and the Snowman soundtrack, 1985	3:47
16.	"Dancing in the Street" (with Mick Jagger of The Rolling Stones)	Marvin Gaye, William "Mickey" Stevenson, Ivy Jo Hunter	Non-album single for Live Aid, 1985; originally by Martha and the Vandellas released as a single in 1964 and appeared on Dance Party the following year	3:10
17.	"Absolute Beginners" (Single edit)		Absolute Beginners soundtrack, 1986	5:37
18.	"Day-In Day-Out" (Single edit)		Never Let Me Down, 1987	4:11

=== U.S. version ===
(*) = Not on the UK version

Disc one
No.	Title	Writer(s)	Originally from	Length
1.	"Space Oddity" (Edited version exclusive to this release)		David Bowie (1969)	3:35
2.	"Changes"		Hunky Dory	3:36
3.	"Oh! You Pretty Things" (*)		Hunky Dory	3:15
4.	"Life on Mars?"		Hunky Dory	3:52
5.	"Ziggy Stardust"		The Rise and Fall of Ziggy Stardust and the Spiders from Mars	3:16
6.	"Starman"		The Rise and Fall of Ziggy Stardust...	4:16
7.	"John, I'm Only Dancing"		non-album single	2:49
8.	"Suffragette City"		The Rise and Fall of Ziggy Stardust...	3:29
9.	"The Jean Genie"		Aladdin Sane	4:09
10.	"Sorrow"	Feldman, Goldstein, Gottehrer	Pin Ups	2:56
11.	"Drive-In Saturday"		Aladdin Sane	4:30
12.	"Diamond Dogs"		Diamond Dogs	6:07
13.	"Rebel Rebel"		Diamond Dogs	4:31
14.	"Young Americans"		Young Americans	5:13
15.	"Fame"	Bowie, Alomar, John Lennon	Young Americans	4:18
16.	"Golden Years"		Station to Station	4:01
17.	"TVC 15" (Edited version exclusive to this release)		Station to Station	3:46
18.	"Be My Wife" (*)		Low	2:58
19.	"Sound and Vision"		Low	3:06
20.	"Beauty and the Beast"		"Heroes"	3:34

Disc two
No.	Title	Writer(s)	Place of Origin	Length
1.	""Heroes"" (Single edit)	Bowie, Eno	"Heroes"	3:39
2.	"Boys Keep Swinging"	Bowie, Eno	Lodger	3:20
3.	"DJ" (Single edit)	Bowie, Eno, Alomar	Lodger	3:24
4.	"Look Back in Anger" (*)	Bowie, Eno	Lodger	3:09
5.	"Ashes to Ashes" (Single edit)		Scary Monsters (And Super Creeps)	3:37
6.	"Fashion" (Single edit)		Scary Monsters (And Super Creeps)	3:26
7.	"Scary Monsters (And Super Creeps)"		Scary Monsters (And Super Creeps)	5:12
8.	"Under Pressure" (with Queen)	Bowie, Mercury, May, Deacon, Taylor	Hot Space (Queen album)	4:05
9.	"Cat People (Putting Out Fire)" (*) (soundtrack version, with Giorgio Moroder)	Bowie, Moroder	Cat People soundtrack, 1982; re-recorded for Let's Dance the following year	6:46
10.	"Let's Dance" (Edited version exclusive to this release)		Let's Dance	4:10
11.	"China Girl" (Edited version exclusive to this release)	Bowie, Osterburg (a.k.a. Pop)	Let's Dance	4:18
12.	"Modern Love" (Edited version exclusive to this release)		Let's Dance	3:59
13.	"Blue Jean"		Tonight	3:12
14.	"Loving the Alien" (*) (Single remix)		Tonight; remixed & released as a 1985 single	4:42
15.	"Dancing in the Street" (with Mick Jagger)	Gaye, Stevenson, Hunter	non-album single for Live Aid	3:17
16.	"Absolute Beginners" (Single edit)		Absolute Beginners soundtrack	5:39
17.	"Day-In Day-Out" (Single edit)		Never Let Me Down	4:17
18.	"Never Let Me Down" (*)	Bowie, Alomar	Never Let Me Down	4:07
19.	"Jump They Say" (*) (Radio edit)		Black Tie White Noise, 1993	3:55

== Charts ==
=== Weekly charts ===
Chart (1993–1997)	Peak position
Australian Albums (ARIA)	49
Austrian Albums (Ö3 Austria)	37
Belgian Albums (Ultratop Flanders)	13
Belgian Albums (Ultratop Wallonia)	22
Dutch Albums (Album Top 100)	5
Finnish Albums (Suomen virallinen lista)	35
French Albums (SNEP)	30
German Albums (Offizielle Top 100)	64
New Zealand Albums (RMNZ)	4
Swedish Albums (Sverigetopplistan)	38
UK Albums (OCC)	9

=== Year-end charts ===
1993 year-end chart performance for The Singles Collection
Chart (1993)	Position
UK Albums (OCC)	53

1997 year-end chart performance for The Singles Collection
Chart (1997)	Position
Dutch Albums (Album Top 100)	81

== Certifications ==
Region	Certification	Certified units/sales
Canada (Music Canada)	Gold	50,000^{^}
France (SNEP)	2× Gold	200,000^{*}
Netherlands (NVPI)	Platinum	100,000^{^}
New Zealand (RMNZ)	Platinum	15,000^{^}
United Kingdom (BPI)	Platinum	300,000^{*}
^{*} Sales figures based on certification alone.^{^} Shipments figures based on certification alone.
