= Young Americans (song) =

1975 single by David Bowie

- US single

Single by David Bowie

from the album Young Americans
- B-side: "Suffragette City" (UK); "Knock on Wood" (US)
- Released: 21 February 1975
- Recorded: August and November 1974
- Studio: Sigma Sound (Philadelphia, Pennsylvania)
- Genre: Philadelphia soul; R&B
- Length: 5:10 (album version); 3:11 (US single)
- Label: RCA
- Songwriter: David Bowie
- Producer: Tony Visconti

David Bowie singles chronology
"Rock 'n' Roll with Me" (1974)	"Young Americans" (1975)	"Fame" (1975)

"Young Americans" is a song by the English singer-songwriter David Bowie from his ninth studio album of the same name. It was mostly recorded in August 1974 at Sigma Sound Studios in Philadelphia and was debuted on the Soul tour the following month. The song featured contributions from then-unknown singer Luther Vandross, who conceived the backing vocal arrangement. An embrace of R&B and Philadelphia soul, the song presents an Englishman's impressionist portrait of America at the time, featuring various characters and allusions to American totems and events.

Released by RCA Records as the lead single on 21 February 1975, the song reached number 18 on the UK Singles Chart but was a breakthrough in the United States, at the time becoming Bowie's second highest-charting single on the Billboard Hot 100 at number 28. He promoted it with an appearance on The Dick Cavett Show in November 1974 and on The Cher Show the following year. Bowie performed the song on his concert tours throughout the 1980s, before retiring it after the Sound+Vision Tour in 1990. Ranked among Bowie's best songs by numerous publications, critics praise "Young Americans" as a successful transition to soul music following the artist's glam rock releases. It has since appeared on several compilation albums and was remastered in 2016 for the Who Can I Be Now? (1974–1976) box set.

== Overview ==
=== Music and lyrics ===
"Young Americans" was a major musical departure for David Bowie. Following years of glam rock and hard rock releases, the song represented a full embrace of the R&B and Philadelphia soul sound of the mid-1970s. Bowie himself referred to the sound as "plastic soul". Discussing the stylistic departure in his book Starman: The Definitive Biography, author Paul Trynka describes the song as a "statement of intent", wherein Bowie was "repositioning the brand".

"Young Americans" compositionally stands out from Bowie's prior recordings. With an improvisational song structure containing three verses and refrains, a saxophone solo, a bridge, a breakdown and two additional extended verses and refrains, author James E. Perone says the use of four-measure phrases flow together through the usage of dominant chords "in a completely natural way". The song is primarily in the key of C major; the verses end on G major, extending into the refrains with F major before reverting to C on the title phrases. The bridge deviates into A minor before the guitar closes it with A major, while the fourth verse is in D major.

[The song is] about a newly-wed couple who don't know if they really like each other. Well, they do, but they don't know if they do or don't. It's a bit of a predicament.

— David Bowie, NME, 1975

According to biographer Nicholas Pegg, "Young Americans" presents a rapid lyric "sketching an Englishman's impressionist portrait of 20th century America". Production team the Matrix noted "America" as "a bit like a teenager: brimming with energy and imagination, occasionally overstepping the mark, but always with a great sense of possibility". The title itself does not appear in the song, only "the young American", who runs through various myths to the point that by the end, he does not know which ones to believe or follow. Author Peter Doggett interprets the song, in one way, as "the portrait of a fantasy: the global dream of how it would feel to have life laid out before you in the land of plenty". The opening verse describes a frigid sexual encounter, which "took him minutes, took her nowhere". (Note: Pegg and Trynka believe this aligned to Bowie's "planned seduction" of America at the time.) Perone says the story informs listeners that issues related to sex and "emotional impotence" exist both outside and in mainstream society, while additional verses reveal the discriminations between race and social classes that exist in American society.

Unlike the fractured imagery of Bowie's previous album Diamond Dogs (1974), "Young Americans" is observational and lyrically influenced by the works of Bruce Springsteen; (Note: Bowie recorded a cover of Springsteen's "It's Hard to Be a Saint in the City" (1973) during the Young Americans sessions, during which Springsteen himself visited the studio.) biographer Chris O'Leary compares the song's clutter of characters to Springsteen's The Wild, the Innocent & the E Street Shuffle (1973). Throughout the song, allusions are made to the Watergate scandal – US President Richard Nixon having resigned only three days prior to its recording – the McCarthy witch hunts ("now you have been the un-American") and civil rights struggles ("sit on your hands on a bus of survivors"). Additional references are made to charms of American society, including "Afro-sheen" – a hair-care product regularly advertised on Soul Train – "Ford Mustang", "Barbie doll", "Cadi" and "Chrysler", and lyrics that provoke images of violence and anguish ("would you carry a razor in case, just in case of depression?" and "ain't there a woman I can sock on the jaw?") Pegg argues the lyrics "cut as deep as 'I'm Afraid of Americans' twenty years later".

The song also makes several British allusions. The opening line, "they pulled in just behind the fridge", was a reference to the comedic English duo Peter Cook and Dudley Moore's stage revue Behind the Fridge, (Note: Pegg says Behind the Fridge was an "ironic deflation" of the duo's 1960s show Beyond the Fringe.) which Bowie had attended in London in 1973. The revue painted American life as a British comedy rather than, in O'Leary's words, "a standard-issue American make-out session in a car parked off the highway". "Young Americans" also contains a vocal quotation of the Beatles' "A Day in the Life" (1967): "I heard the news today, oh boy", (Note: O'Leary notes that Lennon had "read" the news in the first song, establishing "fact is now rumour".) which anticipated Bowie's imminent collaboration with former band member John Lennon. (Note: On a cover of the Beatles' "Across the Universe" and "Fame", both released on Young Americans.) Drawing further Lennon comparisons, Perone relates the song's production on saxophone to Phil Spector's work on Lennon's initial post-Beatle recordings.

=== Recording ===
Recording for "Young Americans" began at Sigma Sound Studios in Philadelphia, Pennsylvania, during the first day of the Young Americans album sessions, on 11 or 13 August 1974. Additional recording took place later on in November. With Tony Visconti producing and Carl Paruolo engineering, the lineup consisted of Bowie, Carlos Alomar on guitar, Willie Weeks on bass, Mike Garson on piano, Andy Newmark on drums, David Sanborn on alto saxophone and Larry Washington on congas. Singer Ava Cherry, Alomar's wife Robin Clark and then-unknown singer Luther Vandross contributed backing vocals.

Unlike other songs recorded at Sigma Sound, the song's structure was mostly already written before the sessions began. The gospel and soul backing vocal arrangements in the refrains were constructed by Vandross with help from Clark, and eagerly added by Bowie. Bowie wrote the middle section after visiting various New York clubs in the spring of 1974 and learning DJs enjoyed singles with breakdowns, such as Eddie Kendricks' "Girl You Need a Change of Mind". For "Young Americans", this sequence initially boasted a phased guitar solo by Alomar.

In September 2009, take three of the song, dated 13 August 1974 on the Sigma Sound reel tape, was leaked online. In this version, all the lyrics are the same but the saxophone and backing vocals are absent, and Bowie's vocal delivery is more conventional than the funkier, syncopated feel of the final version.

== Release and promotion ==
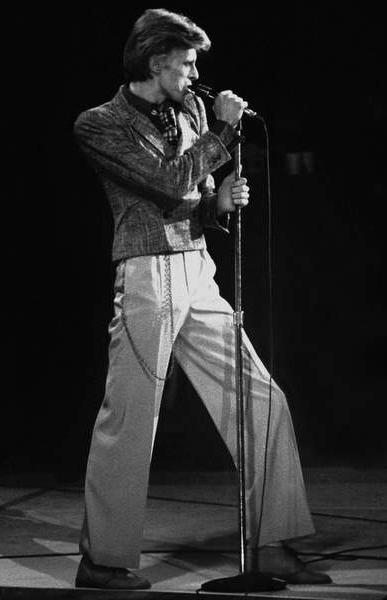
Bowie on the Soul tour in 1974, where he performed "Young Americans" regularly.

Bowie premiered "Young Americans" live on the opening show of his Soul tour in Los Angeles on 2 September 1974, introducing it as "The Young American", and it was a regular throughout the remaining tour; a live version recorded in October was released on I'm Only Dancing (The Soul Tour 74) in 2020. The song, the then-upcoming album's title track, was selected as the lead single and released by RCA Records on 21 February 1975. The UK single (RCA 2523) featured the full five-minute album cut, while the US single (RCA JB 10152) was edited to 3:11, excluding two verses and a refrain. The former's B-side was the Ziggy Stardust track "Suffragette City" (1972), while the latter's was Bowie's 1974 cover of Eddie Floyd's "Knock on Wood" (1966).

Reaching number 18 on the UK Singles Chart and number 28 on the US Billboard Hot 100, the single represented a downturn for Bowie on the United Kingdom charts but was a breakthrough in the United States, becoming his second highest-charting single since "Space Oddity" in 1973 and raised his profile significantly in the country. Bowie's 2 November 1974 performance of the song on The Dick Cavett Show was used as promotion, airing on the BBC's Top of the Pops on 21 February 1975 and was later included on the Best of Bowie and Dick Cavett Show DVD sets, and the 2007 CD/DVD reissue of Young Americans. On the album, released on 7 March, "Young Americans" appeared as the opening track. Later that year on 23 November, Bowie appeared on The Cher Show, where he and Cher sang a medley of American classics bookended by "Young Americans".

== Critical reception ==
"Young Americans" was met with positive reviews from music critics on release, with most praising the music. Reviewing the single, a writer for Cash Box said that Bowie "places his voice against a very R&B oriented track and with such a rock solid foundation for his wall of sound he feels secure hurling his socially conscious lyrics around like so much graffiti". Record Mirror's Sue Byrom referred to it as one of his "most commercial" sounding records to date, highlighting the "funky" saxophone and "lavish" backing vocals. Upon its release on the Young Americans album, Billboard named the song one of the best tracks. Critic Robert Christgau, who called the album an almost total failure in his Record Guide, gave sole praise to "Young Americans", in which "pain stimulates compassion". In a review for Rolling Stone, Jon Landau praised the song as "one of his handful of classics, a bizarre mixture of social comment, run-on lyric style, English pop and American soul". In Canada, Bill Man of The Gazette praised "Young Americans" as one of the best songs Bowie has ever written. In its year-end list, NME ranked "Young Americans" the seventh best single of 1975.

In a more unfavourable review, Melody Maker's Michael Watts referred to the song as "a reasonable, if unmemorable discotheque record". According to Doggett, some contemporary reviewers were perplexed by certain lyrics, such as the notion that "your momma" was suffering from "cramps" or "crabs". The author says that one unnamed "ungracious" British newspaper suggested the latter referred to David's wife Angie Bowie.

== Legacy ==
Bowie continued performing "Young Americans", often equipped with an acoustic guitar, on the 1983 Serious Moonlight, 1987 Glass Spider and 1990 Sound+Vision concert tours. A Serious Moonlight performance, filmed on 12 September 1983, was included on the accompanying concert DVD in 1984 and later on the live album Serious Moonlight (Live '83), released as part of the 2018 box set Loving the Alien (1983–1988) and separately the following year. A Glass Spider performance also appeared on its accompanying DVD in 1988. Beyond 1983, Bowie tended to update the lyrics to match the current times, such as changing "Nixon" to "Reagan" and "Bush". For Sound+Vision, the song often erupted into an extended blues jam featuring snippets of blues and jazz standards such as "Jailhouse Blues". Despite bassist Gail Ann Dorsey's consistent requests to play the song throughout the 1990s and early 2000s, Bowie retired "Young Americans" from live performances after Sound+Vision.

The full-length album version has appeared on several compilation albums, including Changesonebowie (1976), The Best of Bowie (1980), Fame and Fashion (1984), the Sound + Vision box set (1989), Changesbowie (1990), and The Singles Collection (1993). The US single edit has appeared on Rare (1982), The Best of David Bowie 1974/1979 (1998), the American/Canadian edition of Best of Bowie (2002), and the 2-CD and vinyl editions of Bowie Legacy (2016). In 2016, both versions were remastered and included as part of the Who Can I Be Now? (1974–1976) box set. In his review of the box set, Chris Gerard of PopMatters panned the US single as "one of the most abruptly jarring edits ever to make it onto a single". A 2007 remix by Visconti, edited to match the US single, appeared on the 3-CD edition of Nothing Has Changed (2014) and on a 40th-anniversary vinyl single release (2015).

=== Retrospective appraisal ===
Musically simple, lyrically fragmented, emotionally inspired, "Young Americans" presented a Bowie who had never been heard on record before, catching almost everyone who had followed him by surprise.

— Peter Doggett, The Man Who Sold the World, 2012

In subsequent decades, "Young Americans" has attracted acclaim. Deemed a masterpiece by AllMusic's Stephen Thomas Erlewine, Rolling Stone writer Rob Sheffield hailed the song as one of Bowie's finest, with "the rhythm inspiring his most passionate (and compassionate) love letter to his fans". Doggett praises Bowie's vocal performance and overall commitment to the song. Terry Staunton of NME called it his best single ever in 1991. Several critics commended Bowie for a successful transition to soul music and his full commandeering of the style. Perone opines that Bowie effectively established a "new hybrid [soul] style" rather than being a white singer merely attempting to sing soul music. The Guardian's Alexis Petridis commented, "A white British rock star adopting the breezy, sumptuous sound of Philly soul shouldn't have worked at all, but it did, to life-affirming effect." The "ain't there one damn song..." vocal break was later selected by Mojo magazine as the most impressive passage in Bowie's entire catalogue, and by a Rolling Stone writer as his "royal peak".

Following Bowie's death in 2016, Rolling Stone listed "Young Americans" as one of Bowie's 30 essential songs. The song has also appeared on lists compiling Bowie's best songs by The Telegraph, NME (4), The Guardian and Mojo (7), Consequence of Sound (13) and Uncut (17). NME readers also voted it number 14 in a 2018 list of Bowie's 20 best songs. In 2016 lists ranking every Bowie single, "Young Americans" placed at numbers three and five by Ultimate Classic Rock and Slant Magazine, respectively. The former argued the song "summ[ed] up the mid-'70s in five catchy minutes", while the latter called it one of the decade's "best examples" of blue-eyed soul.

The song has also appeared on other best-of lists. In 2003, Blender magazine placed "Young Americans" on its list "the 1001 greatest songs to download right now!" One year later, the song ranked at number 481 on Rolling Stone's list of the 500 Greatest Songs of All Time, and moving up to 204 in its 2021 revised list. In 2016, Pitchfork ranked it number 44 on its list of the 200 best songs of the 1970s.

=== Covers and appearances in media ===
Vandross frequently performed "Young Americans" on stage after 1975, while Guns N' Roses guitarist Slash has spoken about the song's influence on him as a musician. The Cure also covered it as part of 104.9: An XFM Compilation Album (1995), which Dean Carlson of AllMusic described as "paisley". In 1998, American duo the Braids covered "Young Americans" and reached number four in New Zealand with their version. The song has accompanied the end credits of the films Dogville (2003) and Manderlay (2005) of Lars von Trier's series USA: Land of Opportunities, and also appeared briefly in the Nicolas Cage film Lord of War (2005).

== Personnel ==
According to Chris O'Leary:

- David Bowie – lead vocal
- Carlos Alomar – rhythm guitar
- Willie Weeks – bass
- Mike Garson – piano
- Andy Newmark – drums
- David Sanborn – alto saxophone
- Larry Washington – congas
- Ava Cherry – backing vocals
- Robin Clark – backing vocals
- Luther Vandross – backing vocals

Technical

- Tony Visconti – producer
- Carl Paruolo – engineer

== Charts ==
Weekly chart performance for "Young Americans"
Chart (1975)	Peak position
Australian Singles (Kent Music Report)	27
Belgium (Ultratop 50 Wallonia)	36
Canada Top Singles (RPM)	33
Ireland (IRMA)	13
New Zealand (Listener Chart)	1
UK Singles (Official Charts)	18
US Billboard Hot 100	28
US Hot Rock & Alternative Songs (Billboard)	25
US Cash Box Top 100 Singles	20
Chart (2015)	Peak position
France (SNEP)	133

== Certifications ==
Certifications and sales for "Young Americans"
Region	Certification	Certified units/sales
New Zealand (RMNZ)	Platinum	30,000^{‡}
United Kingdom (BPI)	Silver	200,000^{‡}
^{‡} Sales+streaming figures based on certification alone.
