= Cat People (Putting Out Fire) =

1982 song by David Bowie

Single by David Bowie

from the album Cat People: Original Soundtrack
- B-side: "Paul's Theme (Jogging Chase)"
- Released: 12 March 1982
- Recorded: July 1981
- Studio: Music: Carla Ridge Camp (Beverly Hills); Vocals: Mountain (Montreux)
- Genre: New wave
- Length: 4:08 (edited version); 6:41 (full-length version)
- Label: MCA
- Composer: Giorgio Moroder
- Lyricist: David Bowie
- Producer: Giorgio Moroder

David Bowie singles chronology
"'Baal'" (1982)	"Cat People (Putting Out Fire)" (1982)	"Peace on Earth/Little Drummer Boy" (1982)

"Cat People (Putting Out Fire)" is a song recorded by the English singer-songwriter David Bowie as the title track of the 1982 erotic horror film Cat People. Bowie became involved with the track after director Paul Schrader reached out to him about collaborating. The song was recorded at Mountain Studios in Montreux, Switzerland, in July 1981. Bowie wrote the lyrics, which reflected the film, while the Italian producer Giorgio Moroder composed the music.

The song was released as a single by Moroder's label MCA Records in March 1982, appearing in different edits between the 7" and 12" releases, alongside edits for other countries. It also appeared on the accompanying soundtrack album. The single was a commercial success, charting in the UK and the US, and topping the charts in New Zealand, Sweden, Norway and Finland. It is considered one of Bowie's finest recordings of the 1980s. The song has since appeared on numerous compilation albums and was remastered in 2017 for inclusion on the A New Career in a New Town (1977–1982) box set.

Unhappy with the original recording, Bowie remade the track for his 15th studio album Let's Dance (1983), recording it at the Power Station in New York City in December 1982. Featuring production by Chic member Nile Rodgers and lead guitar by blues guitarist Stevie Ray Vaughan, the remake is more aggressive. Despite the remake being the more well-known version due to its parent album's success, some critics have expressed a preference for the original recording. The remake was remastered in 2018 as part of the Loving the Alien (1983–1988) box set.

== Recording and composition ==
Director Paul Schrader reached out to David Bowie in 1980 to collaborate for the theme song of his remake of the Jacques Tourneur horror film Cat People (1942). Biographer Chris O'Leary describes the original film as "a subtle exploration of sexual repression and xenophobia", while he calls the remake a "gory fashion spread". Italian producer Giorgio Moroder had already recorded most of the music at Carla Ridge Camp in Beverly Hills, Los Angeles, so Bowie was approached to write the lyrics to the main theme. Bowie met with Moroder in July 1981 at Mountain Studios in Montreux, Switzerland, to record "Cat People". During the same session, Bowie ran into the English rock band Queen, who were recording their 1982 album Hot Space. After recording backing vocals for their song "Cool Cat", the session resulted in the collaboration "Under Pressure".

Musically, "Cat People" has been described as new wave. In keeping with the dark tone of the film, the song has some goth rock influences, with Bowie singing in a deep baritone croon while being backed up by a female chorus. Bowie's octave leap on the word "gasoline" has been called "a magnificent moment" and "among the most thrilling moments he ever committed to tape". Moroder's music is built around several chord changes, including C minor. Bowie's lyrics reflect the film's pretensions, taking influence from his prior songs "Sound and Vision" (1977) and "It's No Game" (1980), such as the line "those who feel me near / pull the blinds and change their minds". Regarding the film, Bowie said: "It works on a dream state, it feels like the kind of thing you go through at night. That's the way I look at it lyrically".

== Release and aftermath ==
"Cat People (Putting Out Fire)" was released as a single on 12 March 1982. Because of Moroder's contract, the single was issued by MCA Records. The B-side was "Paul's Theme (Jogging Chase)", a Moroder composition from the Cat People soundtrack. The single appeared in numerous different edits. The full-length 6:45 version appeared on the soundtrack album and the 12" single, while a 4:08 edited version was made for the 7" release. In Australia, a 9:20 edit, featuring additional saxophone and synthesiser, was released on a 12" single. Other edits made included a 3:18 edit for American and German promos and a 3:08 edit for Dutch promos. A 4:55 mix appears in the Cat People film itself, with additional panther roars.

Upon release, the single was a commercial success. The 7" single reached number 26 on the UK Singles Chart, remaining on the chart for six weeks, and at number 13 in Canada. In the US, the 7" single charted on three different Billboard charts: it peaked at number 67 on the Pop Singles chart, remaining there for 10 weeks; at number 9 on the Mainstream Rock chart, remaining there for 20 weeks; and at number 14 on the Club Play Singles chart, remaining there for 16 weeks. In other countries, it peaked at number 1 in New Zealand, remaining there for three weeks, as well as in Sweden for four weeks. It was also number 1 in Norway for seven consecutive weeks, and then returned to the top for a further week. The single also peaked at number 1 in Finland.

An RCA executive believed that the collaboration would result in a more "user-friendly" album like Young Americans (1975). The executive told a colleague: "If it isn't too much trouble, it would be nice if DB went into the studio and recorded a real album". He did not, instead acting in the Alan Clarke play Baal and appeared in more films, including The Hunger and Merry Christmas, Mr. Lawrence, both released in 1983.

Alongside appearing on the accompanying soundtrack album in 1982, "Cat People (Putting Out Fire)" has been released on various compilation albums. The full-length version appeared on the US release Bowie: The Singles 1969–1993 in 1993, on the 2003 edition of Bowie's Sound + Vision collection, and on Re:Call 3, part of the A New Career in a New Town (1977–1982) boxed set, in 2017. The shorter 7" single edit has appeared on some versions of Best of Bowie (2002) and on The Platinum Collection (2005).

== Track listing ==
"Cat People (Putting Out Fire)" written by Bowie and Moroder. "Paul's Theme (Jogging Chase)" written by Moroder.

UK 7" single

1. "Cat People (Putting Out Fire)" – 4:08
2. "Paul's Theme (Jogging Chase)" – 3:51

UK 12" single

1. "Cat People (Putting Out Fire)" – 6:41
2. "Paul's Theme (Jogging Chase)" – 3:51

Australian 12" single

1. "Cat People (Putting Out Fire)" – 4:08
2. "Cat People (Putting Out Fire)" – 9:20
- label states running time of 6:41, but is actually 9:20

== Let's Dance version ==
"Cat People (Putting Out Fire)"

Song by David Bowie

from the album Let's Dance
- Released: 14 April 1983
- Recorded: December 1982
- Studio: Power Station (New York City)
- Genre: Dance-rock
- Length: 5:09
- Label: EMI America
- Composer: Giorgio Moroder
- Lyricist: David Bowie
- Producers: David Bowie; Nile Rodgers

Music video
- "Cat People" (from Serious Moonlight Tour) on YouTube

After leaving RCA Records and signing a new deal with EMI America Records in late 1982, Bowie wanted to reinvigorate his musical direction with a new producer. Desiring a commercial sound, he chose Nile Rodgers of the rock band Chic, one of the most commercially successful bands of the late 1970s. After demoing tracks in Montreux, Switzerland, recording for Let's Dance began at the Power Station in New York City during the first three weeks of December 1982.

Bowie had been unhappy with Moroder's backing track for "Cat People", telling Rodgers that he wanted to remake it. Rodgers stated in 1984: "The way 'Cat People' came out on the soundtrack really bothered him. He didn't like it at all. He played me his original demo and I said, 'Wow, that's the way 'Cat People' goes?'" For the re-recording, Rodgers made it cut time "but kept the same tempo so [Bowie] could sing the vocal the same way and the band could keep the pocket". Bowie claimed in 1983: "I took the instruments away. They don't weave quite such a magic spell over the construction of the lyrics...they get the chords right and that's about all I wanted to do".

The re-recording is described by Pegg and O'Leary as more "aggressive". The synthesisers of the original are replaced by keyboards, the verses are "halved" and the backing vocals are run through an Eventide Harmonizer with the pitch raised a minor third. Like the rest of the album, then-unknown blues guitarist Stevie Ray Vaughan plays lead guitar on the song.

The remake of "Cat People (Putting Out Fire)" was released on 14 April 1983 as the seventh and penultimate track on Bowie's 15th studio album Let's Dance, sequenced between the cover of "Criminal World" and "Shake It". The remake was also released as the B-side to the title track's single release on 14 March. It was subsequently performed throughout the Serious Moonlight Tour. At the 26th Annual Grammy Awards, "Cat People" was nominated for the Best Rock Vocal Performance, Male, losing the award to Michael Jackson's "Beat It".

The remake was remastered, along with the rest of its parent album, in 2018 as part of the box set Loving the Alien (1983–1988) and released separately the following year. A concert performance recorded on 12 September 1983 may be heard on the live album Serious Moonlight (Live '83), which was included in Loving the Alien (1983–1988) and released separately in 2019. The performance was filmed and appears on the concert video Serious Moonlight and the DVD version of Best of Bowie.

== Reception ==
The original version of "Cat People" has been praised as one of Bowie's best recordings of the 1980s. Positively received on release, Robert Hilburn of the Los Angeles Times hailed Bowie's vocal performance as one of his finest "in years". Reviewing the original's remaster as part of the A New Career in a New Town (1977–1982) box set, Chris Gerard of PopMatters calls the track "brooding" and one of Bowie's "most potent singles from the era". Mojo magazine listed it as Bowie's 54th best track in 2015. Author Benoît Clerc calls the song a "rich, powerful and compelling track that establish[ed] a new artistic direction for [Bowie]."

The remake, however, has been criticised by biographers and some other reviewers as inferior to the original recording. In a review for Let's Dance on release, Carol Cooper of Record magazine, was critical of the remake: "Chic dynamics over a definitive Bowie/Moroder soundtrack is gilding the lily". Debra Rae Cohen of The New York Times was also critical, remarking that Bowie's vocal performance sounds like Jim Morrison "as if to mock his own lyrics". O'Leary further calls Bowie's vocals inferior to the original, calling his performance "hoarse" and "rushed": "He even defuses the power of the 'gasoline!' break, as if grand dramatics were now beneath him." Vaughan's guest appearance has also received mixed reactions. O'Leary finds it an improvement over the original, while Pegg calls it "alarmingly middle-of-the-road". Cohen similarly wrote that his guitar licks "parody arena-rock clichés".

Pegg calls the remake "decidedly wet" and notes that due to the massive success of Let's Dance, the re-recording is the more well-known version. Trynka writes that the remake "desecrates the memory of a Bowie classic". AllMusic's Dave Thompson calls the original a "deeply atmospheric and utterly effective theme [song]" but pans the remake as "declawed and neutered", writing that "fans of the original should steer as far clear of the remake as they can". Mojo's Pat Gilbert similarly wrote that the "alluring, Expressionist feel" of the original was "defenestrated" by the "clumpy" remake the following year.

== Legacy ==
"Cat People (Putting Out Fire)" has been covered by numerous artists, including Klaus Waldeck in 2003 (released as a single for his album The Night Garden Reflowered), Glenn Danzig in 2007 (released on The Lost Tracks of Danzig), and Sharleen Spiteri in 2010 (released on her album The Movie Songbook). A version featuring Marilyn Manson was recorded by Shooter Jennings in 2016 for his tribute album Countach (For Giorgio). The cover was promoted with a 16-bit music video featuring Manson.

In film, the song has appeared in Firestorm (1998), Atomic Blonde (2017), and Inglourious Basterds (2009). In Inglourious Basterds, the song appears in a pivotal scene for one of the film's major characters. On choosing "Cat People" for the film, director Quentin Tarantino stated: "You're actually shocked at how well the lyrics to 'Cat People' work to her story." Trynka writes that after the Let's Dance remake, the original recording was "exhumed" through its use in Tarantino's film.

== Personnel ==
According to biographer Chris O'Leary:

Original version

- David Bowie – lead vocals
- Giorgio Moroder – guitar, bass, keyboards
- Michael Landau, Tim May – guitars
- Sylvester Levay – piano, guitar
- Brian Banks – keyboards
- Charles Judge – keyboards
- Leland Sklar – bass
- Keith Forsey – drums, percussion
- Craig Huxley – blaster beam
- Alex Brown, Paulette McWilliams, Stephanie Spruill – backing vocals

Technical

- Giorgio Moroder – producer
- Brian Reeves - engineer
- David Richards – engineer

Let's Dance version

- David Bowie – lead vocals
- Nile Rodgers – rhythm guitar
- Stevie Ray Vaughan – lead guitar
- Carmine Rojas – bass
- Tony Thompson – drums
- Rob Sabino – keyboards
- Sammy Figueroa – percussion
- George Simms, Frank Simms, David Spinner – backing vocals

Technical

- David Bowie – producer
- Nile Rodgers – producer
- Bob Clearmountain – engineer

== Charts ==
=== Weekly charts ===
1982 chart performance for "Cat People"
Chart (1982)	Peak position
Australia (Kent Music Report)	15
Canada (CHUM)	9
Canada (RPM)	13
Finland (Suomen virallinen lista)	1
Ireland (IRMA)	17
New Zealand (Recorded Music NZ)	1
Norway (VG-lista)	1
Sweden (Sverigetopplistan)	1
Switzerland (Hitparade)	8
UK Singles Chart	26
US Billboard Hot 100	67
US Billboard Club Play Singles	14
US Billboard Top Rock Tracks	9

=== Year-end charts ===
Year-end chart performance for "Cat People"
Chart (1982)	Position
Australia (Kent Music Report)	92
Canada Top Singles (RPM)	97
New Zealand (Recorded Music NZ)	4

== Certifications ==
Certifications and sales for "Cat People"
Region	Certification	Certified units/sales
New Zealand (RMNZ)	Gold	15,000^{‡}
^{‡} Sales+streaming figures based on certification alone.

== Sources ==
- Buckley, David (2005) [1999]. Strange Fascination – David Bowie: The Definitive Story. London: Virgin Books. ISBN 978-0-7535-1002-5.
- Clerc, Benoît (2021). David Bowie All the Songs: The Story Behind Every Track. New York City: Black Dog & Leventhal. ISBN 978-0-7624-7471-4.
- Doggett, Peter (2012). The Man Who Sold the World: David Bowie and the 1970s. New York City: HarperCollins Publishers. ISBN 978-0-06-202466-4.
- O'Leary, Chris (2019). Ashes to Ashes: The Songs of David Bowie 1976–2016. London: Repeater Books. ISBN 978-1-91224-836-0.
- Pegg, Nicholas (2016). The Complete David Bowie (Revised and Updated ed.). London: Titan Books. ISBN 978-1-78565-365-0.
- Sandford, Christopher (1997) [1996]. Bowie: Loving the Alien. London: Da Capo Press. ISBN 0-306-80854-4.
- Trynka, Paul (2011). David Bowie – Starman: The Definitive Biography. New York City: Little, Brown and Company. ISBN 978-0-316-03225-4.
