= Glass Spider =

- The original US VHS cover

Video by David Bowie
- Released: 1988
- Recorded: November 1987
- Venue: Sydney Entertainment Centre
- Genre: Rock
- Length: 110:00
- Director: David Mallet
- Producer: Anthony Eaton

David Bowie chronology
Ziggy Stardust and the Spiders from Mars: The Motion Picture (1984)	Glass Spider (1988)	Bowie – The Video Collection (1993)

David Bowie video chronology
A Reality Tour (2004)	Glass Spider (Re-release) (2007)	VH1 Storytellers (2009)

2007 Re-release
- Special edition cover

Glass Spider is a concert film by the English singer David Bowie. The release was sourced from eight shows during the first two weeks of November 1987 at the Sydney Entertainment Centre in Australia during the last month of the Glass Spider Tour. The 86-show tour, which also visited Europe, North America and New Zealand, was in support of Bowie's album Never Let Me Down (1987). Originally released in 1988 on VHS, the tour was choreographed by Toni Basil, directed by David Mallet, and produced by Anthony Eaton. The VHS was released by MPI Home Video in the US and by Video Collection International in the UK.

The film stars Bowie, his band including Peter Frampton, and a troupe of dancers performing on what was called at the time "the largest touring set ever". Although the tour received mixed critical reviews at the time, later critics noted that the show changed how other artists (such as Britney Spears, Madonna, and U2) performed on their own tours. In 2010, one critic called the Glass Spider Tour one of the "top concert tour design[s] of all time", and in 2016 another critic called the video one of the best for fans wanting to see Bowie delivering "a rock-theatre spectacular."

An edit of the film was shown on American Broadcasting Company-affiliated stations in June 1988 as a concert special. The full concert video was subsequently released in 1999 on DVD and re-released again in 2007 with a Special Edition, which peaked at number 9 on the UK Video Charts.

== Background and recording ==
The Glass Spider Tour was a worldwide concert tour launched in May 1987 in support of Bowie's album Never Let Me Down (1987). The tour was well attended and profitable, but was poorly received by contemporary critics. His first tour since his 1983 Serious Moonlight Tour, the Glass Spider Tour was seen as a chance for Bowie to return to theatrical stage performances, the way he had in his 1974 Diamond Dogs Tour. As a result, the tour incorporated dancers, music and multi-media elements such as stage projections and props. The set itself was designed to look like a giant spider and stood over 60 feet (18.3m) high, and was described at the time as "the largest touring set ever". The tour features dance choreography by Toni Basil, and Peter Frampton on guitar. Charlie Sexton makes a guest appearance on vocals and guitar in the video release.

Prior to the tour, Bowie stated that he did not intend to produce a live record of the show, but despite this, director David Mallet recorded 8 shows from a nearly 2-week run in Sydney, Australia in the tour's final month. The liner notes say that most of the Glass Spider video comes from the nights of 7 and 9 November 1987, with some footage from the other nights, although Bowie biographer Nicholas Pegg claimed that most of the footage comes from the performance on the evening of 6 November. The video was shot using 17 cameras, and audio was digitally recorded and mastered. While a typical show from the tour ran over 2 hours with around 26 songs, the video release clocks in at under 2 hours and includes only about 20 songs. A 2007 Special Edition re-release includes a CD of the entire show as performed in Montreal, Canada on 30 August 1987, but does not change the video release. The tour and concert film were named after the track "Glass Spider" from the album.

== Releases ==
The film was released on VHS in 1988 by MPI Home Video in the US and Video Collection International in the UK. In promotional fliers released by MPI, they stated that for the video release, they would be launching their "biggest [advertising] campaign ever, with extensive consumer, trade and distributor advertising, radio promos, and TV music channel concert clips." The VHS video release was given an MSRP of US$29.95, and vendors were able to pre-order the video starting 16 May 1988. In some regions, it was released on two video cassettes of 10 songs each until a 1990 compilation combined them into a single release. The running time of the combined VHS is approximately 110 minutes. In 1999 a "semi-official" DVD of the show was released in Far East regions only.

A 1-hour edit from the original release was aired on US prime-time television in early June 1988 on American Broadcasting Company-affiliated stations.

The video was reissued in 2007 on DVD. A regular edition includes the DVD of the same concert as released on VHS, while a special edition also includes a 2 CD live album from the same tour, recorded at Montreal Olympic Stadium on 30 August 1987. The 2007 re-release was originally planned to include a live recording of the song "Glass Spider" recorded in Vienna on 1 July 1987.

The DVD includes stereo, Dolby Digital 5.1 and DTS 5.1 sound and presents the video in its original 1.33:1 aspect ratio. An error in the sound mix on this DVD left much of Peter Frampton's guitar playing scarcely audible. Pegg claimed that as a result, although the picture quality is superior on the DVD release, the original VHS or 1999 DVD remain a superior choice for audio.

== Critical reception ==
Professional ratings
Review scores
Source	Rating
AllMovie	2/5 stars
AllMusic	4/5 stars
People	B+
PopMatters (2007 re-release)	7/10 stars
Record Collector	2 stars

The home video's original 1988 release received positive reviews from sources such as Variety magazine, the Houston Post and the Toronto Star. The Chicago Tribune said the video "offers all of the excitement, spectacle and music" of one of 1987's "most visually engrossing" shows. The AllMusic review called the release "brilliant" and credited the performance with "stunning" live performances that are frequently on par with their studio counterparts. Some reviews were more ambivalent, such as The Boston Globe's review stating simply that "there's a lot to digest." The Los Angeles Times had a mostly negative review of the 1-hour ABC special, calling the show "surprisingly lame" and the stage "silly."

One critic found that the video release rendered the show's intended meaning ("rock stars vs reality") "obscured" for two reasons: First, by the time the show was recorded, Bowie had already dropped some parts of the show that elaborated the point; and second, six songs (and at least one vignette) that were performed in the show were omitted from the video itself. Another critic found that the 1-hour ABC special, which showed only a small subset of the songs performed, and showed them out of order, also "obliterated" the show's meaning.

Pegg said that the concert film was "hugely enjoyable" despite the show's flaws, and unless the 1974 Diamond Dogs Tour or 1990 Sound+Vision Tour videos are released, this release "leads the field for those wishing to see David Bowie delivering a rock-theatre spectacular."

== Track listing ==
All songs were written by David Bowie except where noted. (Note: Sources for this section:) Although they are not mentioned on the sleeve, the original VHS edition contains the same "Intro/Up the Hill Backwards" and band introduction segments that feature on the DVD reissue.

VHS (1988 release/1999 DVD release)
No.	Title	Writer(s)	Length
1.	"Glass Spider"
2.	"Day-In Day-Out"
3.	"Bang Bang"	Iggy Pop, Ivan Kral
4.	"Absolute Beginners"
5.	"Loving the Alien"
6.	"China Girl"	Bowie, Pop
7.	"Rebel Rebel"
8.	"Fashion"
9.	"Never Let Me Down"	Bowie, Carlos Alomar
10.	""Heroes""	Bowie, Brian Eno
11.	"Sons of the Silent Age"
12.	"Young Americans/Band Introduction"
13.	"The Jean Genie"
14.	"Let's Dance"
15.	"Time"
16.	"Fame"	Bowie, John Lennon, Alomar
17.	"Blue Jean"
18.	"I Wanna Be Your Dog"	Dave Alexander, Ron Asheton, Scott Asheton, Pop
19.	"White Light/White Heat"	Lou Reed
20.	"Modern Love"

DVD (2007 release)
No.	Title	Length
1.	"Intro/Up the Hill Backwards"
2.	"Glass Spider"
3.	"Day-In Day-Out"
4.	"Bang Bang"
5.	"Absolute Beginners"
6.	"Loving the Alien"
7.	"China Girl"
8.	"Rebel Rebel"
9.	"Fashion"
10.	"Never Let Me Down"
11.	""Heroes""
12.	"Sons of the Silent Age"
13.	"Band Introduction"
14.	"Young Americans"
15.	"The Jean Genie"
16.	"Let's Dance"
17.	"Time"
18.	"Fame"
19.	"Blue Jean"
20.	"I Wanna Be Your Dog"
21.	"White Light/White Heat"
22.	"Modern Love"

=== Special edition CD 2007 ===
Disc 1
No.	Title	Length
1.	"Up the Hill Backwards"	3:51
2.	"Glass Spider"	5:55
3.	"Day-In Day-Out"	4:34
4.	"Bang Bang"	4:02
5.	"Absolute Beginners"	7:08
6.	"Loving the Alien"	7:14
7.	"China Girl"	4:55
8.	"Rebel Rebel"	3:30
9.	"Fashion"	5:04
10.	"Scary Monsters (And Super Creeps)"	4:52
11.	"All the Madmen"	6:39
12.	"Never Let Me Down"	3:56
Total length:		61:40

Disc 2
No.	Title	Length
1.	"Big Brother"	4:47
2.	"'87 And Cry"	4:07
3.	""Heroes""	5:10
4.	"Sons of the Silent Age"	3:10
5.	"Time Will Crawl/Band Introduction"	5:23
6.	"Young Americans"	5:06
7.	"Beat of Your Drum"	4:37
8.	"The Jean Genie"	5:23
9.	"Let's Dance"	5:01
10.	"Fame"	7:05
11.	"Time"	5:11
12.	"Blue Jean"	3:26
13.	"Modern Love"	4:53
Total length:		63:19 (124:59)

== Personnel ==
Adapted from the Glass Spider liner notes.

Musicians

- David Bowie – lead vocals, guitar
- Carlos Alomar – guitar, backing vocals
- Alan Childs – drums
- Richard Cottle – keyboards, saxophone, tambourine, backing vocals
- Peter Frampton – guitar, vocals
- Erdal Kızılçay – keyboards, trumpet, congas, violin, backing vocals
- Carmine Rojas – bass guitar
- Charlie Sexton – guitar, backing vocals

=== Dancers and performers ===
- Melissa Hurley
- Viktor Manoel
- Constance Marie
- Stephen Nichols
- Craig Allen Rothwell ("Spazz Attack")

=== Production ===
- David Mallet – film director
- Anthony Eaton – film producer
- Toni Basil – choreography
- David Richards – audio mixing
- Mark Ravitz – set design
- Allen Branton – lighting design

== Chart performance ==
The 2007 re-release reached number 9 on the UK Video Charts.

== Bibliography ==
- Pegg, Nicholas (2016). The Complete David Bowie New Edition: Expanded and Updated. London: Titan Books. ISBN 9781785655333.
