= Absolute Beginners (David Bowie song) =

1986 single by David Bowie

Single by David Bowie

from the album Absolute Beginners: The Original Motion Picture Soundtrack
- B-side: "Absolute Beginners" (dub mix)
- Released: 3 March 1986
- Recorded: June 1985; August 1985
- Studio: Westside (Shepherd's Bush, London)
- Length: 8:03 (full-length album version); 5:36 (single version)
- Label: Virgin
- Songwriter: David Bowie
- Producers: David Bowie; Alan Winstanley; Clive Langer

David Bowie singles chronology
"Dancing in the Street" (1985)	"Absolute Beginners" (1986)	"Underground" (1986)

Music video
- "Absolute Beginners" on YouTube

"Absolute Beginners" is a song written and performed by the English singer-songwriter David Bowie. Recorded in August of 1985, and released on 3 March 1986, it was the theme song to the 1986 film of the same name (itself an adaptation of the book Absolute Beginners). Although the film was not a commercial success, the song was a big hit, reaching No. 2 on the UK singles chart. It also reached the top 10 on the main singles charts in ten other countries. In the US, it peaked at No. 53 on the Billboard Hot 100.

Bowie performed "Absolute Beginners" live on his 1987 Glass Spider Tour, his 2000 "Mini" Tour, and his 2002 Heathen Tour. The song has been included on a number of Bowie's compilation and "Best-of" releases, and was included as a bonus track on the 1995 re-release of Tonight (1984).

== Background and recording ==
Bowie was a friend of the film's director, Julien Temple (who had worked with him in 1984 on the Jazzin' for Blue Jean short film). Bowie agreed to Temple's request to write music for the film if he could also play the part of Vendice Partners.

The song was recorded at Clive Langer and Alan Winstanley's Westside Studios in Shepherd's Bush, London, in the summer of 1985. One of the musicians, Kevin Armstrong, said that after only twenty minutes of trying various things, they had a structure and shape that seemed to please Bowie. He took a pen and paper and started jotting down lyrics.

The sessions were completed rapidly, but the song was delayed due to the problems with completing the film. Virgin wanted the release to tie in with the film's opening. The song featured Rick Wakeman on piano, who had previously performed on Bowie's "Space Oddity" single and Hunky Dory studio album. Shortly after the sessions concluded, Mick Jagger flew in to record the charity cover of "Dancing in the Street" with Bowie, which used many of the same musicians. Bowie recorded the lead vocal of "Absolute Beginners" at Westside Studios in August.

== Critical reception ==
AllMusic described "Absolute Beginners" as "the gem of his post-Let's Dance '80s output, a big, breathtaking ballad allowing him to indulge the [Frank] Sinatra croon that's driven many of his best performances". It was chosen by Jeremy Allen in The Guardian as one of Bowie's "ten of the best" songs. Biographer Paul Trynka described "Absolute Beginners" as "Bowie's last great composition of the 1980s", while rock critic Chris O'Leary described it as "gorgeous and valedictory," with "one of the great Bowie melodies" in its refrain. Don Weller's saxophone solo has been described by musicOMH as "perhaps the best" saxophone solo in a Bowie song. They characterised it as "the sound of one man trying to violently expel his innards through the bell of his instrument" and "one of the most heartbreaking things put to record".

"Absolute Beginners" was the second song played on Absolute Radio after officially rebranding from Virgin Radio on 29 September 2008, after the Beatles' "A Day in the Life", and on 19 January 2023, it became the last song to be played on the station's AM frequencies, as part of a tribute to the 1215 kHz frequency, with Christian O'Connell's DJ intro to the song from 2008 also included.

== Music video ==
Julien Temple shot the music video, which echoed the 1950s style of the film. The video was a homage to an old British advert for Strand cigarettes. The ill-fated advertising tagline "You're never alone with a Strand" is quoted by Partners in the film. The video also uses footage from the film.

In 2016, Entertainment Weekly chose it as one of Bowie's 20 best music videos. They stated the video "does a far better job of expressing the noirish romanticism" of MacInnes' novel than the film did and also praised the "great dance-fighting scene at the end".

== Live versions ==
Bowie performed the song live during his 1987 Glass Spider Tour (released on Glass Spider (1988/2007)), a 25 June 2000 performance of the song at the Glastonbury Festival was released in 2018 on Glastonbury 2000, and another live version recorded at BBC Radio Theatre, London, two days later was released on the bonus disc accompanying the first release of Bowie at the Beeb in 2000. The song was performed live on several occasions on the 2002 Heathen Tour as a duet with bassist Gail Ann Dorsey.

== Other releases ==
In 1995, the full-length version appeared as a bonus track on the Virgin Records rerelease of Bowie's 16th studio album Tonight (1984). The 5:36 single version has appeared on the following compilations: Bowie: The Singles 1969–1993 (1993), The Singles Collection (1993),Best of Bowie (2002) (most editions), The Platinum Collection (2005), The Best of David Bowie 1980/1987 (2007), and Nothing Has Changed (2014) (3-CD and vinyl editions). A 4:46 edit, released to promote the single in 1986, was included on the 1-CD and 2-CD editions of Nothing Has Changed and the 2-CD version of Bowie Legacy (2016).

== Track listings ==
All tracks are written by David Bowie, except where noted.

3-inch CD: Virgin CDT 20 (UK)

1. "Absolute Beginners" – 8:03
2. "Absolute Beginners" (dub mix) – 5:40

CD: Virgin CDF 20 (UK)

1. "Absolute Beginners" – 8:03
2. "Absolute Beginners" (dub mix) – 5:40

7-inch: Virgin VS 838 (UK)

1. "Absolute Beginners" – 5:36
2. "Absolute Beginners" (dub mix) – 5:42

12-inch: Virgin VSG 838–12 (UK)

1. "Absolute Beginners" (full length version) – 8:00
2. "Absolute Beginners" (dub mix) – 5:42
- issued in a gatefold sleeve

12-inch: EMI America SPRO 9623 (US)

1. "Absolute Beginners" (edited version) – 4:46
2. "Absolute Beginners" (full length version) – 8:00
- includes exclusive "edited version"

Download: EMI iVS 838 (UK)

1. "Absolute Beginners" – 5:36
2. "Absolute Beginners" (full length version) – 8:00
3. "Absolute Beginners" (dub mix) – 5:42

Download: Amazon.com (US)

1. "Absolute Beginners" – 5:37
2. "Absolute Beginners" (full length version) – 8:03
3. "Absolute Beginners" (dub mix) – 5:39
4. "That's Motivation" – 4:14
5. "Volare (Nel Blu Dipinto Di Blu)" (Comp.: Domenico Modugno) – 3:13
- Original release date (of E.P. download with added tracks 4 and 5): 28 May 2007

== Personnel ==
Producers

- Alan Winstanley
- Clive Langer

=== Engineer ===
- Mark Saunders

Musicians

- David Bowie – vocals
- Rick Wakeman – piano
- Kevin Armstrong – guitar
- Matthew Seligman – bass
- Neil Conti – drums
- Luís Jardim – percussion
- Mac Gollehon – trumpet
- John Thirkell – trumpet
- Don Weller, Gary Barnacle, Paul "Shilts" Weimar, Willie Garnett, Andy MacKintosh, Gordon Murphy – saxophones
- Steve Nieve – keyboards
- Janet Armstrong – backing vocals

Gil Evans sings the refrain of the song in the film.

== Charts ==
=== Weekly charts ===
1986 weekly chart performance for "Absolute Beginners"
Chart (1986)	Peak position
Australia (Kent Music Report)	5
Austria (Ö3 Austria Top 40)	2
Belgium (Ultratop 50 Flanders)	3
Canada Top Singles (RPM)	45
Europe (European Hot 100 Singles)	1
Finland (Suomen virallinen lista)	1
France (SNEP)	21
Greece (IFPI)	2
Ireland (IRMA)	1
Italy (Musica e dischi)	2
Netherlands (Dutch Top 40)	4
Netherlands (Single Top 100)	8
New Zealand (Recorded Music NZ)	4
Norway (VG-lista)	4
South Africa (Springbok Radio)	6
Spain (AFYVE)	15
Sweden (Sverigetopplistan)	5
Switzerland (Schweizer Hitparade)	3
UK Singles (Official Charts)	2
US Billboard Hot 100	53
US Mainstream Rock Airplay (Billboard)	9
US Cash Box Top 100 Singles	61
West Germany (GfK)	7

2016 weekly chart performance for "Absolute Beginners"
Chart (2016)	Peak position
Portugal (AFP)	81

=== Year-end charts ===
Year-end chart performance for "Absolute Beginners"
Chart (1986)	Position
Australia (Kent Music Report)	40
Austria (Ö3 Austria Top 40)	22
Belgium (Ultratop 50 Flanders)	27
Europe (European Hot 100 Singles)	25
Netherlands (Dutch Top 40)	41
Netherlands (Single Top 100)	53
New Zealand (RIANZ)	37
Switzerland (Schweizer Hitparade)	30
UK Singles (Gallup)	52
West Germany (Media Control)	73

== Certifications ==
Certifications for "Absolute Beginners"
Region	Certification	Certified units/sales
United Kingdom (BPI)	Silver	250,000^{^}
^{^} Shipments figures based on certification alone.
