= Sons of the Silent Age =

Song by David Bowie

from the album "Heroes"
- Released: 14 October 1977
- Recorded: Hansa Studio by the Wall, West Berlin; July–August 1977
- Genre: Art rock
- Length: 3:15
- Label: RCA
- Songwriter(s): David Bowie
- Producer(s): David Bowie, Tony Visconti

"Sons of the Silent Age" is a song written by David Bowie in 1977 for the album "Heroes". According to Brian Eno, it was the only song on the album composed prior to the recording sessions, all others being improvised in the Hansa by the Wall studio. Bowie himself indicated that Sons of the Silent Age could at one stage have been the title for the album, rather than "Heroes".

== Analysis, recording, and release ==
Biographer David Buckley remarked on the song's "doomy sax-driven verses set incongruously aside cheesy choruses". The lyrics have been interpreted as a third-person revisitation of the themes of psychotic withdrawal explored on Bowie's previous album Low ("Pacing their rooms just like a cell's dimensions"), as well as referencing the characters from his 1970 song "The Supermen" ("They never die they just go to sleep one day") on the album The Man Who Sold the World. Author Nicholas Pegg speculated that the lines "platforms, blank looks, no books" and "rise for a year or two then make war" alluded to the Nazi regime.

Bowie performed the song live during his 1987 Glass Spider Tour and it appears as a live track on the Glass Spider live album and video. On this version of the song, the chorus is sung by the band's lead guitarist Peter Frampton. The studio version appeared in the Sound + Vision box set in 1989 (and re-released in 2003). A re-mastered version was released in the box set A New Career in a New Town (1977–1982) (2017).

== Cover versions ==
- Philip Glass – "Heroes" Symphony (1996)
- Danny Michel – Loving the Alien: Danny Michel Sings the Songs of David Bowie (2004)
- Shearwater – as part of a live performance of the entire Berlin Trilogy for WNYC (2018)
