= Erdal Kızılçay =

Turkish multi-instrument musician

- Born: 1950 (age 75–76); Turkey
- Occupation: Multi-instrumentalist
- Website: erdalkizilcay.com

Erdal Kızılçay (born c. 1950) is a Turkish-born multi-instrumentalist. He has worked with, among others, David Bowie. He plays bass guitar, oud, drums, keyboards, trumpet and violin. He lives in Aegerten, Switzerland.

== Work with David Bowie ==
Kızılçay started working with David Bowie in the early 1980s, notably playing bass on a demo of Bowie's 1983 single "Let's Dance", although he did not appear on the final recording. Kızılçay is a multi-instrumentalist; for example, he played every instrument except guitar on the song "Shades" on Iggy Pop's album Blah Blah Blah (1986), which was co-produced and co-written by Bowie. Bowie biographer Chris O'Leary called Kızılçay a "godsend" for Bowie, as he allowed Bowie to "cut full studio demos without the bother of shipping in [lots of musicians]." Kızılçay and Bowie co-wrote the song "When the Wind Blows" for the 1986 film of the same name. The two then co-wrote two songs for Bowie's 1987 album Never Let Me Down: "Girls"; and "Too Dizzy". For the album, Kızılçay played multiple instruments on virtually every song, including bass, drums, keyboards, organ, synthesizer, and violins. Kızılçay joined Bowie on the Glass Spider Tour in 1987 in support of Never Let Me Down, a live recording of which was released in 1988 as Glass Spider. On the Glass Spider Tour, Kızılçay played keyboards, violin, conga and trumpet, and sang backing vocals. In 1988, Kızılçay, Reeves Gabrels, Bowie and Kevin Armstrong collaborated on a project for London's Institute of Contemporary Arts (ICA) in which they four of them re-arranged Bowie's 1979 song "Look Back in Anger". Gabrels and Armstrong would join Bowie in 1989 in the band Tin Machine, a project that Kızılçay was not a part of. In 1990, Kızılçay joined Bowie during his Sound+Vision Tour.

The two recorded together again on Bowie's album The Buddha of Suburbia (1993). They spent the middle of 1993 at Mountain Studios in Switzerland, taking about three weeks to write, record and mix the album, for which many of the songs Kızılçay was the sole instrumentalist. Kızılçay also received a producer's credit on several songs from the album.

In 1994, Kızılçay joined other musicians including Brian Eno, Reeves Gabrels, Carlos Alomar, Mike Garson and Sterling Campbell in the creation of Bowie's album Outside (1995). During the sessions, Bowie and Eno used experimental techniques previously utilised during the Berlin Trilogy, such as the latter's Oblique Strategies cards – "part-fortune cookie, part-Monopoly 'Chance' cards" intended to spark creative ideas. Each one contained a written character, such as "You are the disgruntled member of a South African rock band. Play the notes that were suppressed." Kızılçay was reportedly opposed to the use of these cards at first, finding them confusing and useless. He later complained about Eno's methods to the biographer Marc Spitz, stating "he cannot even play four bars ...[nor] play two harmonies together. [...] I don't know how he became so famous."

After 1995, the relationship between the two fell apart, with Kızılçay later saying that Bowie "changed his way of being with me at the end of the recording of Outside. I don't even know why, for what reason." Bowie removed "Too Dizzy" from later re-issues of Never Let Me Down. Kızılçay said he was upset, and said that "from now on I don't think I would wish to work again with David Bowie." After Bowie died in 2016, his 1987 album Never Let Me Down was re-engineered and partly re-recorded and released as Never Let Me Down 2018 (2018). Kızılçay was unhappy with the new song arrangements and threatened a lawsuit as a result.

== Discography ==
=== Albums with David Bowie ===
- Never Let Me Down (1987)
- Glass Spider (1988) (video)
- The Buddha of Suburbia (1993)
- 1. Outside (1995)

=== With Iggy Pop ===
- Blah-Blah-Blah (1986)

=== With Jane Siberry ===
- When I Was a Boy (1993)

=== With Jacques Dutronc ===
- Jacques Dutronc au casino (1992)
- Brèves Rencontres (1995)

=== With Andreas Vollenweider ===
- Caverna Magica (1983)
- Vox (2004)

=== With Septime Sévère ===
- Un escalier-Sandra-Charleroi-Un air bête (2014)

=== Solo ===
- Fahrünnisa (1996)

=== Music direction ===
- Hercules
- Magic Sword

=== With The Royal Philharmonic Orchestra ===
- Sezen Aksu (2015)
