= Up the Hill Backwards =

- US 12" single

Single by David Bowie

from the album Scary Monsters (and Super Creeps)
- B-side: "Crystal Japan"
- Released: March 1981
- Recorded: February–April 1980
- Studio: Power Station, New York City; Good Earth, London
- Genre: R&B
- Length: 3:13
- Label: RCA
- Songwriter: David Bowie
- Producers: David Bowie; Tony Visconti

David Bowie singles chronology
"Scary Monsters (And Super Creeps)" (1981)	"Up the Hill Backwards" (1981)	"Under Pressure" (1981)

"Up the Hill Backwards" is a song by the English musician David Bowie, released on his 1980 album Scary Monsters (and Super Creeps). It was later issued by RCA Records as the fourth and final single from the album in March 1981. Originally written under the title "Cameras in Brooklyn", the song was recorded between February and April 1980 at the Power Station in New York City and Good Earth Studios in London. The recording features backing vocalists, guitar contributions from Robert Fripp and acoustic guitar played by co-producer Tony Visconti. Lyrically, the song concerns the struggles of facing a crisis, partially influenced by Bowie's divorce from his wife Angie. Musically, the song contains numerous time signature changes and a Bo Diddley-inspired beat.

The song has received positive reviews from music critics and biographers, with most praising its unusual composition. Because of this, however, the song stalled as a single, peaking at No. 32 on the UK Singles Chart and No. 49 in Canada. Bowie never performed "Up the Hill Backwards" live in its entirety during his concert tours, although the first verse was performed during the openings of the 1987 Glass Spider Tour. The song has appeared on compilation albums, while a demo has appeared on bootlegs. Mojo magazine later listed it as Bowie's 24th greatest song in 2015.

== Recording ==
David Bowie originally wrote "Up the Hill Backwards" under the title "Cameras in Brooklyn". It was recorded during the sessions for Scary Monsters (and Super Creeps) (1980) at New York City's Power Station in February 1980. The backing tracks for the song were completed here. The lineup consisted of Bowie, drummer Dennis Davis, rhythm guitarist Carlos Alomar and bassist George Murray, with lead guitar played by King Crimson guitarist Robert Fripp and Roy Bittan, a member of Bruce Springsteen's E Street Band, on piano. Co-producer Tony Visconti contributed acoustic guitar and backing vocals while Lynn Maitland and Chris Porter sang backing vocals. Chuck Hammer, who recorded guitar synthesiser parts for "Ashes to Ashes" and "Teenage Wildlife", recorded a part for "Up the Hill Backwards", although this was replaced by Fripp. Decades later, Hammer stated, "[It's] too bad, [as they were] perhaps the most exploratory of all the tracks recorded."

Instead of improvising lyrics and music as he had with prior releases, Bowie informed Visconti he wanted to take time composing and developing the lyrics and melodies. As such, Bowie's vocals were not recorded until April 1980 at London's Good Earth Studios, Visconti's own studio at the time. Visconti later recalled: "We asked a casual friend, Lynn Maitland, to join David and I singing a group vocal for this song. [...] [It was] another big departure for David, since he doesn't sing solo on this." Indeed, Bowie sings in unison with Visconti, Porter and Maitland, which biographer Chris O'Leary feels "gives strength and reassurance".

== Composition ==
The lyrics of "Up the Hill Backwards" deal with the struggle of facing a crisis. Bowie misquotes Thomas Anthony Harris's 1967 self-help book I'm OK – You're OK, a guide on how to save marriage relationships; NME editors Roy Carr and Charles Shaar Murray see this as a reference to Bowie's divorce from his wife Angie, which initiated shortly before the sessions for Scary Monsters began and was finalised later in 1980. In the 2016 edition of his book The Complete David Bowie, biographer Nicholas Pegg found that the opening lines were taken verbatim from artist and filmmaker Hans Richter's 1964 book Dada: Art and Anti-Art: "...and finally the vacuum created by a sudden arrival of freedom and the endless possibilities it seemed to offer if one could grasp them firmly enough."

Musically, biographer Paul Trynka describes the song as "gospelly", while author James Perone considers it a unique form of R&B. The song features unusual time signatures throughout: the opening section is seven bars of 7/8 time and one bar of 3/8 time, while the guitar breaks pan out in 7/4 time, which Visconti had trouble recording. AllMusic's Ned Raggett considered the changing time signatures representative of the "fragmentary compositions" of Bowie's Berlin Trilogy (1977–1979) — "smoothly assembled to result in a striking new song". Similarly, author Peter Doggett noted the song's fragmentary nature, stating: "[T]he time signatures didn't marry up, there were no neat links between the separate sections of the song, and the lyrics were vaguely apocalyptic fragments."

Commentators have found the beat inspired by guitarist Bo Diddley; Bowie himself called the opening and ending sections "a high-energy Fripp quasi-Bo Diddley thing". Murray, meanwhile, compared the beat to Bowie's Aladdin Sane track "Panic in Detroit" (1973). Doggett finds the verses reminiscent of 1950s rock and roll, noting the same chord sequence as Eddie Cochran's "Summertime Blues". In the rhythm section, Murray's baseline follow the vocal harmonies and counter Fripp's soloing in the outro, while Davis's drum playing, in O'Leary's words, "drives the verses like a drill sergeant". Raggett wrote: "The inventive, decidedly non-obvious guitar soloing, the heavy, almost electronic sounding drumming and subtle use of polyrhythms and more all blend wonderfully together."

== Release and reception ==
"Up the Hill Backwards" was released on 12 September 1980 as the second track of Bowie's 14th studio album Scary Monsters (and Super Creeps), sequenced between "It's No Game (No. 1)" and the title track. RCA belatedly released it as the fourth and final single from the album in March 1981, with the catalogue number RCA BOW 9 and "the instrumental "Crystal Japan" as the B-side. Due to its uncommercial nature, the single stalled at No. 32 on the UK Singles Chart. It also briefly charted at No. 49 in Canada. The song has received positive reviews from music critics and biographers, with most praising its unusual composition. Both Pegg and Trynka consider it "superb", while Raggett calls it one of the highlights of Scary Monsters. Marc Spitz considers the song, along with the title track and "Fashion", among Bowie's best works of the 1970s. Perone praises Bowie's ability to "create musical and lyrical conflicts" in his songs that "force listeners to grapple with their own experiences and emotions", writing that he captures that perfectly on "Up the Hill Backwards". Mojo magazine later listed it as Bowie's 24th greatest song in 2015. In a 2016 list ranking every Bowie single from worst to best, Ultimate Classic Rock placed "Up the Hill Backwards" at number 55, describing it as "a good but difficult song" that was bound for chart failure due to its musical complexity.

== Live performances and subsequent releases ==
Bowie never performed "Up the Hill Backwards" live in its entirety during his concert tours. However, the first verse of the song was performed during the opening moments of the 1987 Glass Spider Tour. The shows began with Alomar playing a guitar solo and repeatedly told to "shut up" (in reference to "It's No Game (No. 1)"). Afterwards, the dance troupe emerged miming to pre-recorded dialogue, followed by the first verse of "Up the Hill Backwards" before segueing into "Glass Spider". Performances from the tour were released on the 1988 Glass Spider concert film and the live album Glass Spider: Live Montreal '87 (2018).

"Up the Hill Backwards" was included on the 1989 Sound + Vision box set and later on the 2007 compilation album The Best of David Bowie 1980/1987. An early demo of the track, with a duration of 3:21, has appeared on bootleg albums. According to Pegg, the demo features a funkier bass line, a "close-to-the-mike lead vocal" and different lyrics, such as "Skylabs are falling" instead of "witnesses falling", a reference to a then-recent media frenzy regarding the July 1979 dissolution of NASA's Skylab upon re-entry into Earth's atmosphere.

== Track listing ==
All tracks written by David Bowie.

1. "Up the Hill Backwards" – 3:14
2. "Crystal Japan" – 3:10

== Personnel ==
According to biographer Chris O'Leary:

- David Bowie – vocals, keyboards, producer
- Robert Fripp – lead guitar
- Carlos Alomar – rhythm guitar
- George Murray – bass guitar
- Dennis Davis – drums
- Roy Bittan – piano
- Tony Visconti – acoustic guitar, backing vocals, producer
- Lynn Maitland – backing vocals
- Chris Porter – backing vocals

== Charts ==
Chart (1981)	Peak position
Canada RPM Top Singles	49
UK Singles Chart	32
