= Fame and Fashion =

Compilation album by David Bowie
- Released: April 1984
- Recorded: 1969–1980
- Genre: Rock
- Length: 54:15
- Label: RCA Victor
- Producer: Producer varies from track to track

David Bowie chronology
Ziggy Stardust: The Motion Picture (1983)	Fame and Fashion (1984)	Love You till Tuesday (1984)

David Bowie compilation chronology
Golden Years (1982)	Fame and Fashion (1984)	Changesbowie (1990)

Professional ratings
Review scores
Source	Rating
AllMusic	2/5 stars
The Encyclopedia of Popular Music	3/5 stars
Spin Alternative Record Guide	5/10

Fame and Fashion is a compilation album by English musician David Bowie, issued in 1984 by RCA Records featuring songs recorded from 1969's David Bowie through 1980's Scary Monsters (And Super Creeps). It was released on LP, cassette, and CD formats. The subtitle "David Bowie's All-Time Greatest Hits" appears along with the title on LP and cassette labels, as well as on the CD face and inserts.

After Bowie left RCA Records in 1983, RCA, wishing to continue to capitalize on Bowie's immense popularity at the time, continued to release compilation albums without his permission or input. All the songs except "'Heroes'" and "TVC 15" were previously issued on the Changesonebowie and Changestwobowie compilation albums, and three, "Golden Years", "Fashion", and "Ashes to Ashes" appeared on the Golden Years compilation less than a year earlier. In addition, on both the LP's second side and the corresponding tracks on the CD, the original stereo channels are swapped.

Soon after the release of this album and the reissue of his entire RCA catalog on compact disc, Bowie reclaimed the rights to his recordings and his entire catalog on RCA Records went out of print. Bowie later struck a deal with Rykodisc to reissue his recordings, beginning in 1989. Bowie's RCA album catalog on CD was in print only briefly and the original RCA discs are highly collectible today. As Golden Years and Fame and Fashion were issued without Bowie's authorization, neither album has been reissued in any form subsequent to their original RCA releases.

== Track listing ==
All tracks written by David Bowie except where noted.

Side one
No.	Title	Writer(s)	Length
1.	"Space Oddity"		5:15
2.	"Changes"		2:32
3.	"Starman"		4:10
4.	"1984"		3:24
5.	"Young Americans"		5:10
6.	"Fame"	Bowie, Carlos Alomar, John Lennon	4:00

Side two
No.	Title	Length
7.	"Golden Years"	4:03
8.	"TVC 15"	5:29
9.	"Heroes"	6:07
10.	"D.J."	3:59
11.	"Fashion"	4:45
12.	"Ashes to Ashes"	4:21

== Chart performance ==
=== Weekly charts ===
Chart (1984)	Position
Australian Kent Music Report Albums Chart	19
Italian Albums (Musica e dischi)	4
UK Albums Chart	40
US Billboard 200	147

=== Year-end charts ===
Chart (1984)	Position
Australian Albums Chart	92
