= Scary Monsters (and Super Creeps) (song) =

1980 song by David Bowie

Single by David Bowie

from the album Scary Monsters (and Super Creeps)
- B-side: "Because You're Young"
- Released: 2 January 1981
- Recorded: February–April 1980
- Studio: Power Station, New York City; Good Earth, London
- Genre: Post-punk
- Length: 5:10 (album version); 3:27 (single version)
- Label: RCA
- Songwriter: David Bowie
- Producers: David Bowie; Tony Visconti

David Bowie singles chronology
"Fashion" (1980)	"Scary Monsters (and Super Creeps)" (1981)	"Up the Hill Backwards" (1981)

"Scary Monsters (and Super Creeps)" is a song by the English singer-songwriter David Bowie, released as the title track of his 1980 album Scary Monsters (and Super Creeps). It was also issued as the third single from that album in January 1981. Coming as it did in the wake of two earlier singles from Scary Monsters, "Ashes to Ashes" in August 1980 and "Fashion" in October the same year, NME critics Roy Carr and Charles Shaar Murray labelled its release another instance "in the fine old tradition of milking albums for as much as they could possibly be worth". The song was subsequently performed on a number of Bowie tours.

Musically the track was notable for its lead guitar work by Robert Fripp and distinctive synthesized percussion. The lyrics, sung by Bowie in his Cockney accent, charted a woman's withdrawal from the world and descent into madness ("When I looked in her eyes they were blue but nobody home ... Now she's stupid in the street and she can't socialise"). Thematically the song has been compared to Joy Division's "She's Lost Control" (1979), and to the "claustrophobic romance" of Iggy Pop's 1977 collaborations with Bowie, The Idiot and Lust for Life.

The edited single reached No. 20 on the UK singles chart. As well as 7" vinyl, it was issued on cassette. RCA did not issue the single in the United States.

== Track listing ==
All tracks written by David Bowie.

1. "Scary Monsters (and Super Creeps)" – 3:27
2. "Because You're Young" – 4:51

The French release of the single had "Up the Hill Backwards" as the B-side.

== Personnel ==
According to Chris O'Leary:

- David Bowie – lead and backing vocals
- Robert Fripp – lead guitar
- Carlos Alomar – rhythm guitar
- George Murray – bass guitar
- Dennis Davis – drums
- Tony Visconti – acoustic guitar, EDP Wasp, backing vocals

Production

- Tony Visconti
- David Bowie

== Charts ==
Chart (1981)	Peak position
Ireland (IRMA)	17
UK Singles (Official Charts)	20

== Live versions ==
A concert performance recorded on 12 September 1983 was included on the live album Serious Moonlight (Live '83), which was part of the 2018 box set Loving the Alien (1983–1988) and was released separately the following year. The filmed performance appears on the concert video Serious Moonlight (1984). The song was performed during the 1987 Glass Spider Tour, although a 1987 live performance of the song was not included until the 2007 special edition release of Glass Spider featured a performance recorded in Montreal, Canada. Bowie performed the song with Nine Inch Nails numerous times during the Outside Tour and one live version was released on the concert album No Trendy Réchauffé (Live Birmingham 95) (2020). Bowie performed the song on Saturday Night Live during a season 22 episode hosted by Neve Campbell on 8 February 1997, later released on the album Saturday Night Live - 25 Years Volume 1. A July 1997 performance at the Phoenix Festival was released in 2021 on Look at the Moon! (Live Phoenix Festival 97). Bowie and Reeves Gabrels performed an all-acoustic country and western version of the song for the radio station WRXT in Chicago Il on 16 October 1997.

== Other releases ==
- The song appeared on the following compilations:
  - Golden Years (1983) – album version
  - The Singles Collection (1993) – album version
  - Best of Bowie (2002) – single edit
  - The Platinum Collection – single edit
  - The Best of David Bowie 1980/1987 (2007) – single edit
  - Nothing Has Changed (2014) (3-CD version) – single edit
- The single edit of the song was also included on Re:Call 3, part of the A New Career in a New Town (1977–1982) compilation (2017).
