= Jam Underground =

- Also known as: JAMU
- Genres: Rock

Jam Underground also known as JAMU, is an American rock band noted for its musical improvisation, extended jams, and merging of discrete music genres. Their music blends elements of a wide variety of genres, including rock, jazz, funk, hip hop, world, electronic, ambient, and classical. Each of their concerts is original in terms of improvised textures, modes, lyrics and multiple guest artists.

Jam Underground is based around the core band member Chuck Hammer, guitar; and a wide rotating group of artists and improvisers.
