= It's No Game =

Song by David Bowie

from the album Scary Monsters (and Super Creeps)
- Released: 12 September 1980
- Recorded: February 1980 (No. 1, No. 2); April 1980 (No. 1)
- Studio: Power Station, New York City (No. 1, No. 2); Good Earth, London (No. 1)
- Genre: Hard rock; new wave; post-punk
- Length: 4:15 (No. 1); 4:22 (No. 2)
- Label: RCA
- Songwriter: David Bowie
- Producers: David Bowie; Tony Visconti

"It's No Game" is a song written by the English singer David Bowie for his 1980 album Scary Monsters (and Super Creeps), featuring lead guitar played by Robert Fripp. The song is split into two parts, opening and closing the album. "(No. 1)" is musically sinister, featuring Bowie screaming lyrics and Japanese narration provided by actress Michi Hirota. "(No. 2)", a stark contrast to "(No. 1)", is much calmer, which Bowie's biographers symbolise as Bowie facing the same situation in "(No. 1)", but after the album's duration.

Alongside the album, "(No. 1)" was released as the B-side of the US version of the single "Ashes to Ashes" in August 1980. Bowie never performed "It's No Game" live during his concert tours, although the ending of "(No. 1)" was adapted for the 1987 Glass Spider Tour. The full song was later performed in the 2015 musical Lazarus.

== Recording ==
Recording sessions for Scary Monsters (and Super Creeps) began at the Power Station in New York City in February 1980. The backing tracks for "It's No Game" were completed here, with "(No. 2)" completed in its entirety. King Crimson guitarist Robert Fripp contributed lead guitar to "(No. 1)". Recorded around the same time was the instrumental "Crystal Japan"; it was originally intended to be the album's closing track, but was dropped in favour of a reprise of "It's No Game". According to biographer Chris O'Leary, "(No. 2)" was the original version of the track; its development history was similar to that of the Beatles' 1968 song "Revolution", which was first recorded as a slower, acoustic track (the version present on the White Album), and then as a hard rocker.

Instead of improvising lyrics and music as he had with prior releases, Bowie informed Visconti he wanted to take time composing and developing the lyrics and melodies. As such, Bowie's vocals were not recorded until April 1980 at Good Earth Studios in London, co-producer Tony Visconti's own studio at the time. Also recorded here was the Japanese narration provided by actress Michi Hirota for "(No. 1)".

== Music and lyrics ==
Parts of "It's No Game" were adapted from an earlier, unreleased song titled "Tired of My Life", which Bowie demoed at Haddon Hall in mid-1970. Bowie claimed to have written "Tired of My Life" as early as 1963, a claim supported by Visconti who stated that Bowie wrote the song when he was 16. When composing "It's No Game", Bowie re-used the melody, structure, and several lyrics from "Tired of My Life", some of which shared similar themes to Bowie's 1970 album The Man Who Sold the World.

=== "No. 1" ===
The lyrics to "It's No Game (No. 1)" are spoken in Japanese by Michi Hirota, with Bowie screaming the English translation "as if he's literally tearing out his intestines", according to NME editors Roy Carr and Charles Shaar Murray. O'Leary cites this as reminiscent of John Lennon's performance on Plastic Ono Band (1970). Bowie said that he employed a strident female vocal "to break down a particular kind of sexist attitude" regarding Japanese girls and women in general; Hirota recites the lyrics as-is, complete with the strong male "I" pronoun, ore. The track ends with an intense guitar loop played by Fripp, followed by Bowie screaming "Shut up!". Author Peter Doggett calls the ending "stunning, scarifying, [and] relentless".

=== "No. 2" ===
In contrast to the musical and vocal intensity of "(No. 1)", "It's No Game (No. 2)" is much calmer; Carr and Murray interpreted this as meaning that by the album's close, Bowie is "facing the same situation which he confronted when the album began, but with the force of his rage somewhat spent. Things haven't improved, but he's taking it better." Doggett writes that whereas "(No. 1)" "climaxed with the signals of insanity", "(No. 2)" "just end[s], draining color from everything around it". Similar to how the album begins, it ends with the sound of a tape rewinding and playing out, although this time, it slows to a halt.

== Release and reception ==
Both parts of "It's No Game" were released on 12 September 1980 on Bowie's 14th studio album Scary Monsters (and Super Creeps), with "(No. 1)" opening the album and "(No. 2)" closing the album. "(No. 1)" was also released as the B-side of the US version of the single "Ashes to Ashes" in August 1980. In Japan it was released as a single in 1980 with "Fashion" as the B-side. A specially created pressing featuring both parts 1 and 2 for the first time on 7" vinyl was included with the book Speed of Life (Genesis Publications, 2012) released in a limited edition of 2,000 copies signed by Bowie and photographer Masayoshi Sukita. The picture vinyl features photography by Sukita.

Bowie never performed "It's No Game" live during his concert tours. However, the closing moments of "(No. 1)" – featuring Fripp's manic guitar interrupted by Bowie's cry of "Shut up!" – were recreated for the opening moments of his 1987 Glass Spider Tour. The full song was later performed in the 2015 musical Lazarus. O'Leary writes that for the musical, Bowie turned "It's No Game" into an "absurdist set piece": stuck in his apartment, the character of Thomas Jerome Newton, after witnessing a violent death montage, "hallucinates being hurled around the room by a female samurai".

Mojo magazine listed "It's No Game (No. 1)" as Bowie's 73rd best track in 2015. Three years later, NME staff-writer Emily Barker voted "(No. 1)" his 40th best song, praising Bowie's ability to "make immensely likable and at the same time dystopian music".

== Personnel ==
According to biographer Chris O'Leary:

- David Bowie – lead and backing vocal, piano, producer
- Robert Fripp – lead guitar "(No. 1)"
- Carlos Alomar – rhythm guitar
- George Murray – bass
- Dennis Davis – drums, ratchet "(No. 1)"
- Michi Hirota – lead vocal "(No. 1)"
- Tony Visconti – backing vocal, producer

== Cover versions ==
- Born to Worry – A version called "It's No Game Part 3" on the 1999 album Loving the Alien: Athens Georgia Salutes David Bowie.
- Nine Inch Nails – Guitar samples from the Bowie song, slowed and in reverse, on "Pinion" from the 1992 EP Broken; the sample is more clearly heard in the intro tape played prior to most Nine Inch Nails concerts.
