= Scream Like a Baby =

Song by David Bowie

from the album Scary Monsters (And Super Creeps)
- Released: September 12, 1980
- Recorded: February 1980; April 1980
- Studio: Power Station, New York City; Good Earth, London
- Genre: Post-punk
- Length: 3:35
- Label: RCA
- Songwriter: David Bowie
- Producers: David Bowie, Tony Visconti

"Scream Like a Baby" is a song written and performed by David Bowie. It appears on the 1980 album Scary Monsters (And Super Creeps).

== Music and lyrics ==
The song focuses on a protagonist called Sam who is evidently being held, along with the track's narrator, in a political prison. Though set in the future, the story is related in the past tense, in a fashion Bowie has described as "future nostalgia... A past look at something that hasn't happened yet". Musically the song is noted for its "ultra-modern new wave guitar/synth sound", as well as for Bowie's use of varispeed vocals to illustrate Sam's downward spiral in the prison hospital – according to NME critics Roy Carr and Charles Shaar Murray, the effect is "as if the narrator of 'All the Madmen' inhabited the world of '1984'".

"Scream Like a Baby" was one of several tracks on Scary Monsters that evolved from pieces Bowie had written years before. It was originally composed in 1973, with different lyrics, as "I Am a Laser" for The Astronettes (Ava Cherry, Geoffrey MacCormack and Jason Guess). Bowie worked on an album for the group but it was eventually dropped, finally surfacing in 1995 as the Ava Cherry album People from Bad Homes; "I Am a Laser" was one of the tracks.

== Release, promotion and live performances ==
"Scream Like a Baby" was released as the B-side to the single "Fashion" in October 1980. Bowie intended to play the song during his 1987 Glass Spider Tour, including in rehearsals leading up to the tour, but the song was dropped from the set list by the time the tour started.

== Personnel ==
According to Chris O'Leary:

- David Bowie – lead and backing vocals
- Carlos Alomar – guitar
- Andy Clark – synthesizer
- George Murray – bass
- Dennis Davis – drums

Production

- David Bowie – producer
- Tony Visconti – producer
