= Golden Years (album) =

Compilation album by David Bowie
- Released: August 1983
- Recorded: 1973–1980
- Genre: Rock
- Length: 36:55
- Label: RCA

David Bowie chronology
Let's Dance (1983)	Golden Years (1983)	Ziggy Stardust: The Motion Picture (1983)

David Bowie compilation chronology
Rare (1982)	Golden Years (1983)	Fame and Fashion (1984)

Professional ratings
Review scores
Source	Rating
AllMusic	2/5 stars
The Encyclopedia of Popular Music	3/5 stars
Spin Alternative Record Guide	4/10

Golden Years is a 1983 compilation album by David Bowie issued by RCA Records.

After 11 years with RCA Records, Bowie left the label and signed with EMI Records, releasing his highly successful album Let's Dance in 1983. Wishing to capitalize on Bowie's and the new album's popularity, RCA issued Golden Years, a compilation of previously released Bowie tracks. The cover art featured a recent photo of Bowie, giving a false first impression the album was an all-new release. All the tracks on this album were performed live by Bowie during his 1983 Serious Moonlight tour.

Of the album's nine tracks, four had appeared in previous David Bowie compilations albums released by RCA Records: "Golden Years" was included in Changesonebowie (1976) and "Fashion", "Ashes to Ashes", and "Wild Is the Wind" were included in Changestwobowie (1981). However, Golden Years used the original album versions of "Fashion" and "Ashes to Ashes" rather than the shorter single edits as included in Changestwobowie.

Eight months after the release of Golden Years, RCA issued another David Bowie compilation album, Fame and Fashion (David Bowie's All-Time Greatest Hits) (1984), which included three songs previously included in Golden Years ("Golden Years", "Ashes to Ashes", and "Fashion"). Bowie was displeased by the release of the Golden Years and Fame and Fashion compilations, both of which were issued without his consultation or input. After RCA reissued his earlier albums on compact disc in 1984-1985, Bowie reclaimed the rights to his catalogue and later struck a deal with Rykodisc to reissue his recordings, beginning in 1989. As a result, Bowie's original RCA CD catalogue was in print relatively briefly; today, the RCA CDs are considered highly collectible.

As Golden Years and Fame and Fashion were issued without Bowie's authorization, neither album has been reissued in any form subsequent to their RCA CD editions in 1985.

== Track listing ==
All tracks written by David Bowie except where noted.

=== Side one ===
1. "Fashion" – 4:51
2. "Red Sails" (Bowie, Brian Eno) – 3:47
3. "Look Back in Anger" (Bowie, Eno) – 3:07
4. "I Can't Explain" (Pete Townshend) – 2:14
5. "Ashes to Ashes" – 4:26

=== Side two ===
1. "Golden Years" – 3:59
2. "Joe the Lion" – 3:08
3. "Scary Monsters (And Super Creeps)" – 5:14
4. "Wild Is the Wind" (Dimitri Tiomkin, Ned Washington) – 6:00

== Chart performance ==
Chart (1983)	Peak position
German Albums (Offizielle Top 100)	50
New Zealand Albums (RMNZ)	17
Swedish Albums (Sverigetopplistan)	33
UK Albums (OCC)	33
US Billboard Top LPs & Tape	99
