= Crystal Japan =

Song by David Bowie

- U.S. 12" single

Single by David Bowie
- B-side: "Alabama Song"
- Released: Spring 1980
- Recorded: 1980
- Genre: Ambient
- Length: 3:08
- Label: RCA Victor
- Songwriter: David Bowie
- Producers: David Bowie; Tony Visconti

David Bowie singles chronology
"Alabama Song" (1980)	"Crystal Japan" (1980)	"Ashes to Ashes" (1980)

"Crystal Japan" is an instrumental piece written by David Bowie and released as a single in Japan in spring 1980. It was recorded during the Scary Monsters sessions that year. The instrumental was used in a Japanese commercial for the shochu Crystal Jun Rock, which also featured an appearance by Bowie, although he said at the time that the track was not specifically written for this purpose. Originally titled "Fuji Moto San", it was apparently intended to close the Scary Monsters album until replaced by "It's No Game (No. 2)".

== Track listing ==
1. "Crystal Japan" (David Bowie) – 3:08
2. "Alabama Song" (Bertolt Brecht, Kurt Weill) – 3:51

== Other releases ==
- The instrumental was released as the B-side to the single "Up the Hill Backwards" in March 1981. "Teenage Wildlife" was originally slated as the B-side for "Up the Hill Backwards" until Bowie found out fans were paying high prices for import copies of the "Crystal Japan" single and insisted RCA issue the track in the UK.
- In 1992, the piece was released as a bonus track on the Rykodisc reissue of the album Scary Monsters (And Super Creeps).
- "Crystal Japan" also appeared on the compilations Rare (1982) and All Saints (2001), and on Re:Call 3, part of the A New Career in a New Town (1977–1982) boxed set (2017).
- Trent Reznor of Nine Inch Nails took the melody of "Crystal Japan" and used it as the basis for the track "A Warm Place", released on their 1994 album The Downward Spiral. Bowie's official website later said the two songs were so similar that "A Warm Place" was "a thinly-veiled cover" of "Crystal Japan".
