= Rare (David Bowie album) =

Compilation album by David Bowie
- Released: December 1982
- Recorded: 1969–1980
- Genre: Rock
- Length: 42:02
- Label: RCA

David Bowie chronology
Baal (1982)	Rare (1982)	Let's Dance (1983)

David Bowie compilation chronology
Changestwobowie (1981)	Rare (1982)	Golden Years (1983)

Professional ratings
Review scores
Source	Rating
Allmusic	3/5 stars
The Encyclopedia of Popular Music	2/5 stars
Smash Hits	6½/10

Rare (often referred to as Bowie Rare) is a compilation album by the English musician David Bowie, released by RCA Records in December 1982. The artist's relations with the company were at a low – Bowie had recorded his last music for RCA Records with the Baal EP, and had been annoyed by the release of a five-year-old duet with Bing Crosby ("Peace on Earth/Little Drummer Boy") as a single without his consultation. Bowie informed RCA he was unhappy with the Rare compilation, and would sign with EMI Records for his next album. All tracks on Rare were being issued for the first time on LP and cassette.

The compilation contained rarities recorded between 1969 and 1980. RCA did not issue Rare in the United States; nor was the album reissued on CD along with most of Bowie's other RCA albums in 1984.

On the UK Albums Chart, where it remained for eleven weeks, the album peaked at number 34.

== Track listing ==
All songs are written by David Bowie except where noted.

=== Side one ===
1. "Ragazzo solo, ragazza sola" (Bowie, Mogol) – 5:02
  - An Italian-language song featuring all new lyrics set to the music of "Space Oddity", released as single in Italy in late-1969/early-1970
2. "'Round and 'Round" (Chuck Berry) – 2:41
  - A cover of the Chuck Berry song "Around and Around", recorded for the Ziggy Stardust sessions, and released as the B-side to the single "Drive-In Saturday"
3. "Amsterdam" (Jacques Brel, Mort Shuman) – 3:25
  - A cover of a Jacques Brel song, recorded for the Ziggy Stardust sessions, and released as the B-side to the single "Sorrow"
4. "Holy Holy" – 2:15
  - A newer version of Bowie's 1970 single, recorded for the Ziggy Stardust sessions, and released as the B-side to the single "Diamond Dogs"
5. "Panic in Detroit" – 5:49
  - Live recording from the same concerts as David Live, and released as the B-side to the single "Knock on Wood"
6. "Young Americans" – 3:11
  - US single edit

=== Side two ===
1. "Velvet Goldmine" – 3:08
  - Recorded for the Ziggy Stardust sessions, and released as the B-side to the 1975 reissue of "Space Oddity"
2. "Heroes"/„Helden“ (Bowie, Brian Eno, Antonia Maass) – 6:07
  - A version of "Heroes" with English and German lyrics, released as single in West Germany in 1977
3. "John, I'm Only Dancing (Again)" – 3:26
  - Single edit
4. "Moon of Alabama" (Bertolt Brecht, Kurt Weill) – 3:51
  - Recorded 1978, released as single A-side, 1980
5. "Crystal Japan" – 3:07
  - Recorded 1979 for the soundtrack of a Japanese commercial, released as a Japanese single A-side, 1980, then internationally as the B-side to "Up the Hill Backwards" single, 1981.

== Charts ==
Chart (1983)	Peak position
Dutch Albums (Album Top 100)	27
Finnish Albums (Suomen virallinen lista)	23
German Albums (Offizielle Top 100)	13
Italian Albums (Musica e dischi)	22
New Zealand Albums (RMNZ)	10
Norwegian Albums (VG-lista)	11
Swedish Albums (Sverigetopplistan)	5
UK Albums Chart	34
