= Natasha Korniloff =

Russian costume designer

Natasha Korniloff was a Russian costume designer active in London in the last third of the 20th century. She is best known for having created stage outfits for David Bowie, in particular the Pierrot costume he wore in 1980 in the videoclip for Ashes to Ashes and on the cover of his Scary Monster album.

== Life ==
Natasha Korniloff was a folk singer and costume designer when during the winter of 1967-1968 she met David Bowie in the entourage of Lindsay Kemp. She was in charge of the costume design for Kemp and Bowie's play, Pierrot in Turquoise or The Looking Glass Murders, and in particular designed for Bowie a “blue cloud” outfit. During the tour she was accompanying, she had an affair with the future star.

Natasha Korniloff died of cancer around 2010.

== Works ==
Her most famous designs have been worn by David Bowie:

- full body tights in a black spider web pattern, largely revealing the body, with two basket hands on the chest, for a 1973 Ziggy Stardust concert;
- a pencil skirt in the style of a "Communist China Air Hostess" worn in December 1979 for the Saturday Night Live show in New York;
- outfits from the 1978 Stage tour (Isolar II Tour): white baggy pants, worn with a T-shirt and sailor cap, a plastic tuxedo, a faux snakeskin jacket worn again during the Outside tour in 1995;
- the costume of Pierrot from the album Scary Monsters and the clip Ashes to Ashes, in foamy points and silver mesh.

She was also the author of the outfits for the 1980 Floor Show, recorded in October 1973 at the Marquee: those of the dancers, the black Queen dress worn by Amanda Lear in her interpretation of Sorrow in a duet with Bowie and those of Marianne Faithfull. She has created several stage costumes for Freddie Mercury.

She then continued her career as a costume designer1, working in particular regularly for the Ballet Rambert.

In 1998 she produced the costumes for Steve Harvey who played the role of Bowie in the stage performance A Rock 'N' Roll Suicide by Iain Forsyth and Jane Pollard.
