= Chuck Hammer =

American musician

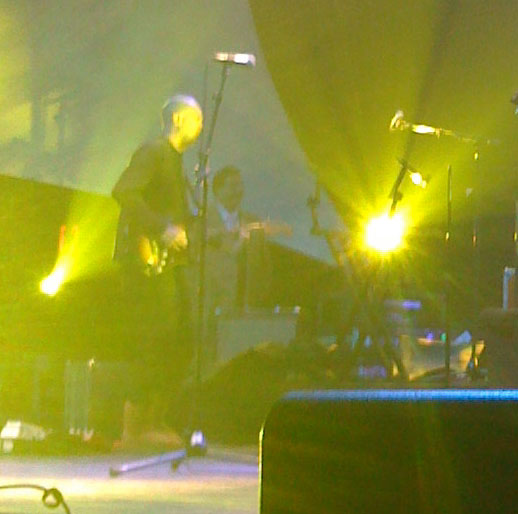
- Hammer at Terminal 5, New York City, 2015
- Occupation: Guitarist · Composer

Chuck Hammer is an American guitarist and soundtrack composer, known for textural guitar work with Lou Reed, David Bowie, and Guitarchitecture. As an artist, Hammer is best known for his Guitarchitecture recordings, though he is also widely regarded as a leading New York City based soundtrack composer, having scored approximately 300 documentary films. He is currently developing a series of improvisational textural guitar recordings.

He was born in New York City and attended University at Buffalo, studying classical guitar with Oswald Rantucci, jazz with Archie Shepp, and attended lectures presented by Karlheinz Stockhausen. As a guitarist Hammer was a central figure within the Lou Reed Band from November 1978 through mid 1981 including the June 1979 Lou Reed concerts at The Bottom Line in New York City with Don Cherry.

== Early work ==
Hammer worked and toured extensively as a textural guitarist with Lou Reed from November 1978 through mid 1981. During these concerts and recordings Hammer utilized new guitar technology, known as guitar-synth, to orchestrate songs from Berlin, Street Hassle, The Bells and The Velvet Underground. It was during this time that Hammer developed an approach to composing and recording known as Guitarchitecture. Hammer recorded with Reed on Growing Up in Public, January 1980.

In March 1980, Hammer recorded guitar-synth tracks with David Bowie on the album Scary Monsters (And Super Creeps), including multiple textures across "Ashes to Ashes" and "Teenage Wildlife", both of which marked the earliest use of guitar-synth in Bowie's catalogue. The actual instruments utilized on these tracks included a Roland GR-500 with Eventide Harmonizer and multiple analogue tape delays.

Textural tracks, such as those on Bowie's "Ashes to Ashes" and "Teenage Wildlife", exhibited a highly experimental multi-layered approach to recording and composing with the guitar. Hammer's recordings with David Bowie represent one of the most influential and genre defining approaches to textural guitar layering. They are regarded as having opened the door to the textural guitar movement that followed.

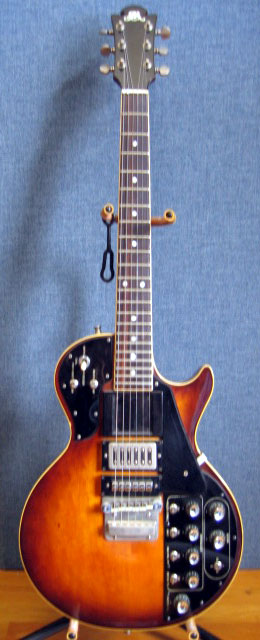
Roland GR 500 Guitar Synth Controller that Hammer used while recording with David Bowie and Lou Reed

== Guitarchitecture ==
Hammer's recorded work is broadly known as Guitarchitecture, a process and term which he developed in 1977. The underlying thought behind Guitarchitecture is to extend the sonic vocabulary of the guitar. Guitarchitecture involves widening the guitar's textural vocabulary by altering its temporal sustain characteristics and context. This approach often utilizes extended sustain, reshaped timbres, discreet vibrato techniques, textural event layering, and simply breaking down a chord to its basic elements and recording each element separately (as a modified guitar orchestra). The term Guitarchitecture applies to both Hammer's soundtracks in the digital film medium, and his recorded guitar work.

Hammer was accorded pioneer status by Rolling Stone, alongside an eclectic and select group, including Robert Fripp and Allan Holdsworth, having been attributed with leading a new era of development in the global guitar community, influencing instrument capabilities, form and functions in music.

He is currently developing a series of Guitarchitecture soundtracks.

In 2016 Hammer completed the recording and production of "Blind On Blind" with Billy Martin; Jamaaladeen Tacuma; and Jamie Saft. A 76-minute gapless album recorded over a three-year period that explores Hammer's concept of Recombinant Textural Layering.

== Guitarchitecture recordings ==
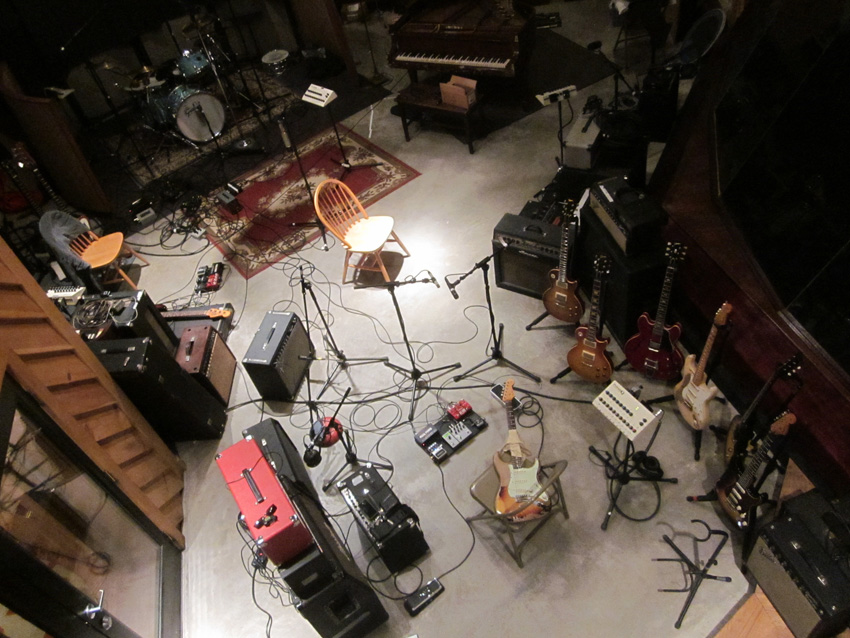
Chuck Hammer, recording rig, 2015, Woodstock, NY

- Glacial Guitars
- Cathedral Guitars (solo Acoustica 1)
- Avignon Crosses (solo Acoustica 2)
- Moonless Night
- Shelter Curve
- Arctic Circles
- Blind On Blind (Hammer–Martin–Tacuma–Saft)
- Path Heart Traverse
- Aetherial
- Djenne Djenno
- Antennae Katyusha
- Requiem For A Thousand Cellos At War

== Additional sessions and compilation discography ==
Appears on:

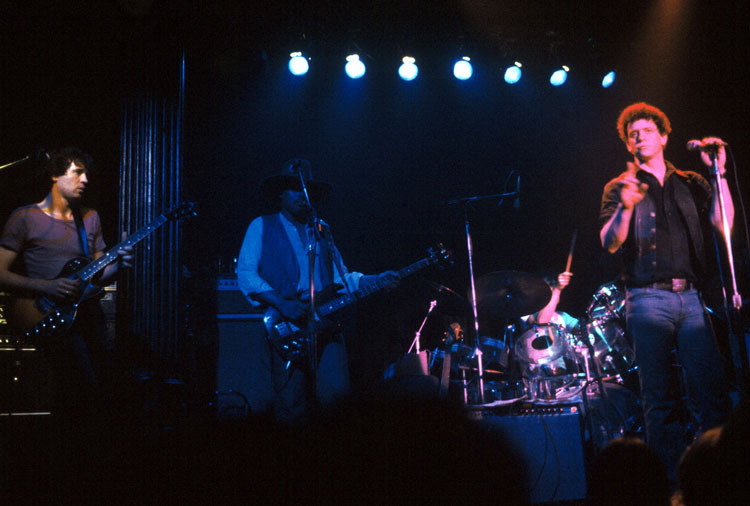
Chuck Hammer and Lou Reed performing June 1979, The Bottom Line, New York City

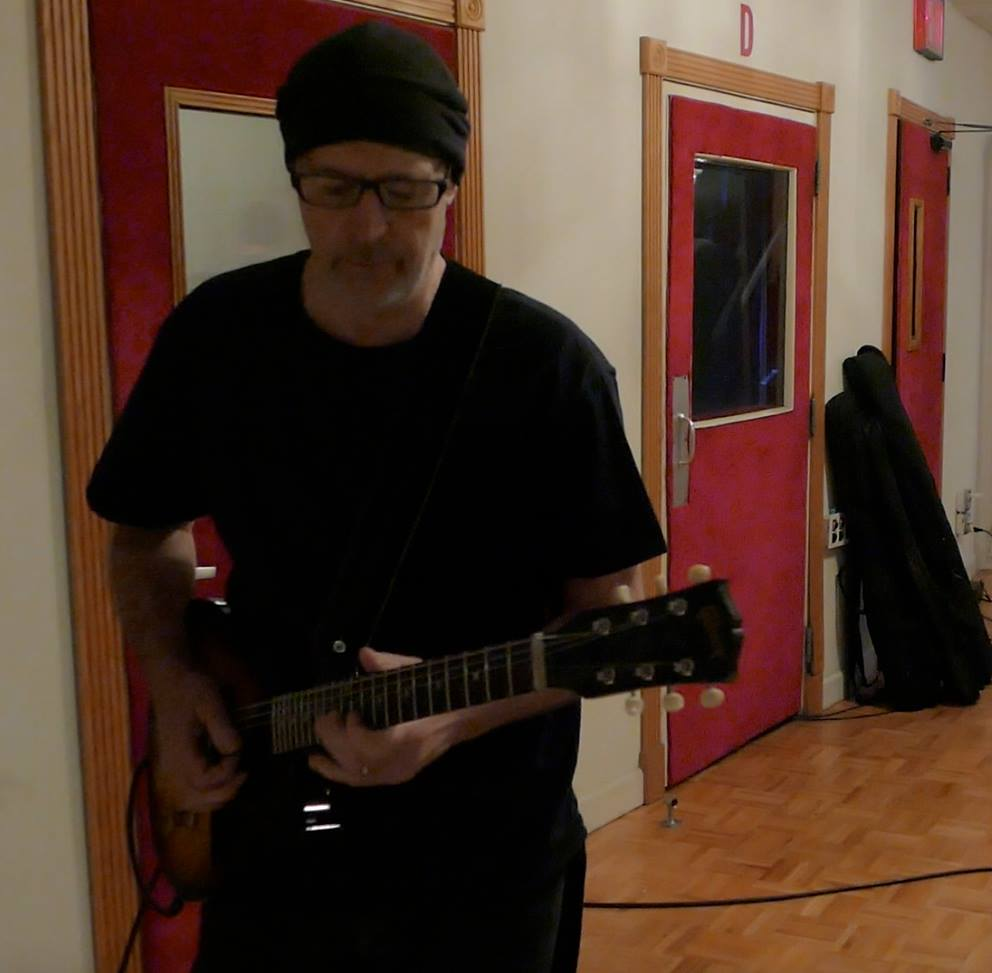
Chuck Hammer, recording, New York City, 2018

- Growing Up in Public, Lou Reed, (1980)
- Scary Monsters (and Super Creeps), David Bowie, (1980), UK No. 1, US No. 12)
- Changestwobowie, David Bowie, (1981)
- The Singles Collection (David Bowie album), David Bowie, (1993)
- Best of Bowie, David Bowie, (2002)
- Rock and Roll Diary: 1967–1980 Lou Reed, (1980)
- City Lights Lou Reed, (1985)
- Someday, Arlo Guthrie, (1986)
- Between Thought and Expression: The Lou Reed Anthology, [box set], Lou Reed, (1992)
- Perfect Day, Lou Reed, (1999)
- Escape Artist, Garland Jeffreys, (1980), Epic
- Showstopper, Jamaaladeen Tacuma, (1982), gramavision
- Golden Years (1983) – album version
- Fame and Fashion (1984) – album version
- ChangesBowie (1990) – album version
- The Best of David Bowie 1980/1987 (2007) – single edit
- The Collection, David Bowie (Teenage Wildlife), (2005)
- Sound + Vision (box set), David Bowie, (2003)
- The Platinum Collection (David Bowie album), David Bowie, (2005)
- Nothing Has Changed (2014) – single edit
- Bowie Legacy (2016) – single edit
- A New Career in a New Town (1977–1982), David Bowie, (2017)

== Film and broadcast soundtracks ==
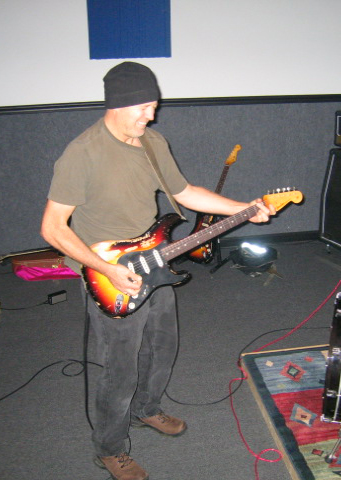
Chuck Hammer, New York City, 2015

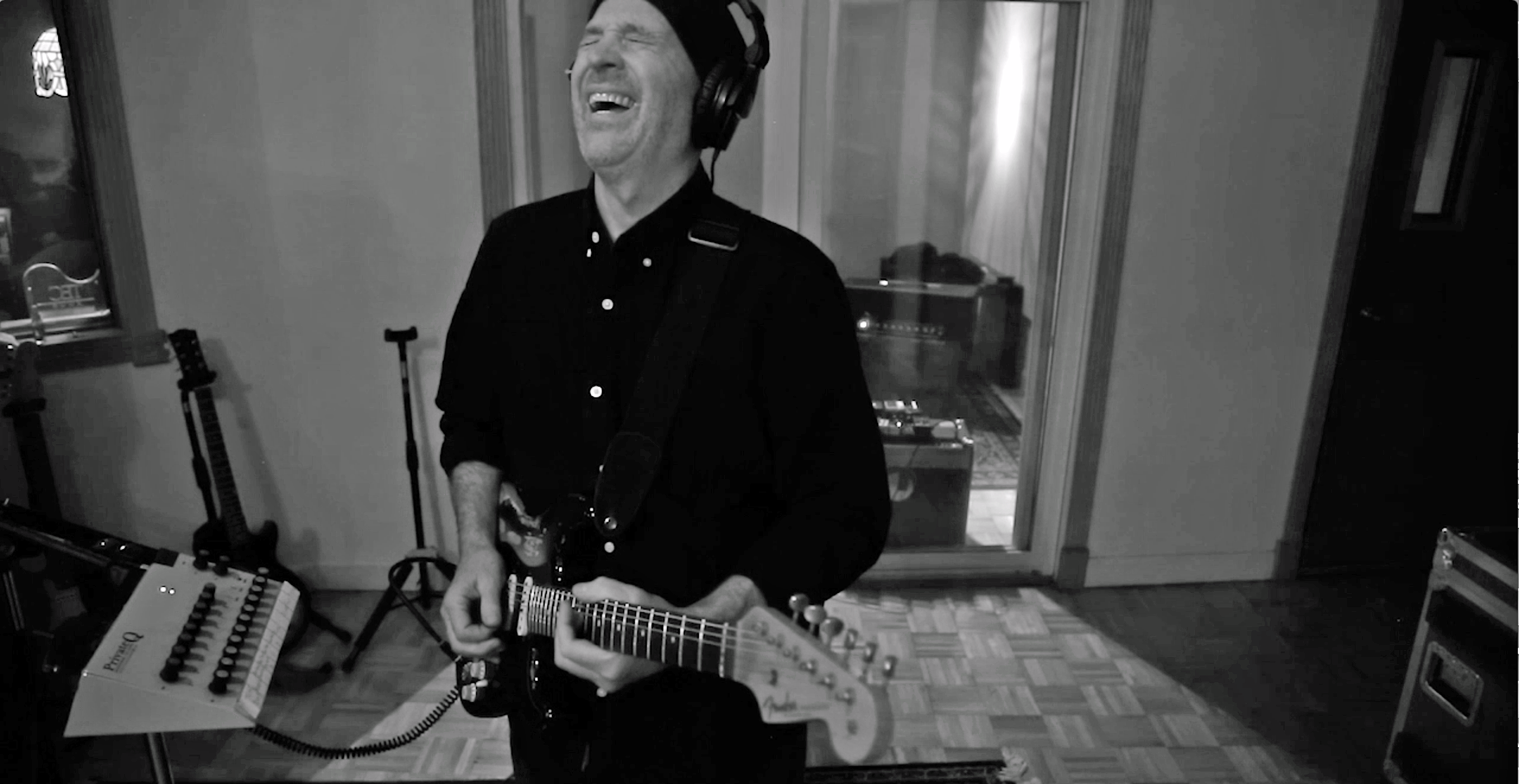
Chuck Hammer, recording, New York City, 2018

In 1983 Hammer began composing film soundtracks with a Synclavier, adding a Digital Guitar Interface in 1984. Later that same year he worked with Laurie Anderson, triggering synchronized samples, from her Mister Heartbreak multitrack recordings live, utilizing the Digital Guitar Interface. In 1985 he recorded "Glacial Guitars", a series of Guitarchitecture pieces that deploy cello timbres and string controlled sampling. in 1986 Hammer recorded "Cathedral Guitars", a series of solo acoustic pieces. In November 1986 he collaborated with David Gordon, composing "The Seasons", for the Next Wave Festival, which premiered at the Brooklyn Academy of Music (BAM). Hammer utilized a synthaxe as the primary instrument to reshape audio elements while recording this musique concrète piece.

In 1989 Hammer designed AVA studios in New York City, a multi media production facility, that focused on film and digital music scoring. Between 1994 and 2004 he composed soundtracks for an extended series of non fiction documentaries; collaborating extensively with The New York Times, National Geographic, Discovery Communications, and A&E Network. These soundtracks were widely broadcast internationally and in effect broadened the textural range and darkened the tone of soundtracks that followed in the genre, through merging textural guitar, advanced editing techniques and processed sonic artifacts. The following is a partial list of series and documentary soundtracks he has composed:

- Trauma: Life in the E.R.
- The First 48
- Paramedics
- Science Times
- World Birth Day
- Police Force
- Maternity Ward
- Breaking News
- Women and the Badge
- Just Off The Coast
- Crazy Eights
- The Wreck
