= Teenage Wildlife =

Song by David Bowie

from the album Scary Monsters (And Super Creeps)
- Released: September 12, 1980
- Recorded: February 1980; April 1980
- Studio: Power Station, New York City; Good Earth, London
- Genre: Art rock; new wave; post-punk
- Length: 6:56
- Label: RCA
- Songwriter: David Bowie
- Producers: David Bowie, Tony Visconti

"Teenage Wildlife" is a song written by David Bowie in 1980 for the album Scary Monsters (And Super Creeps). Running at almost seven minutes, the song was the longest track on Scary Monsters, and Bowie's longest composition since "Station to Station" (1976), although it was surpassed in length by later tracks such as 2003's "Bring Me the Disco King" and 2016's "Blackstar".

The song is structurally similar to "'Heroes'" but does not feature a refrain; its verses only end with the title being sung over Robert Fripp's guitar breaks. Its backing vocals are reminiscent of the Ronettes, while piano is provided by Roy Bittan. The song's lyrics have been widely interpreted. One interpretation is they are an attack on "Bowie imitators" who emerged in the late 1970s, such as Gary Numan, who personally believed himself a target. Roy Carr and Charles Shaar Murray state that the song is Bowie reflecting on his younger self, while Nicholas Pegg considers it a confrontation to critics who tried to prevent Bowie from evolving throughout the 1970s. Bowie himself wrote in 2008 that the lyrics are about "taking a short view of life, not looking too far ahead and not predicting the oncoming hard knocks".

== Music and lyrics ==
"Ironically, the lyric is something about taking a short view of life, not looking too far ahead and not predicting the oncoming hard knocks"

— David Bowie,

The song's original title was "It Happens Everyday". Producer Tony Visconti said "Instead of singing 'Not another teenage wildlife' [Bowie] would sing 'It happens everyda-a-ay.'"

Against a musical backdrop that owed much to his classic song "Heroes", including textural guitar work from both Robert Fripp and Chuck Hammer, and adds wandering phrases following his lyrical paragraphs, Bowie appeared to take aim squarely at his post-punk artistic godchildren, particularly Gary Numan:

A broken-nosed mogul are you

One of the new wave bores
Same old thing in brand new drag
Comes sweeping into view
As ugly as a teenage millionaire

Pretending it’s a whiz-kid world

In a 1980 interview, Bowie commented on Numan and his "whiz-kid world", saying "What Numan did he did excellently but in repetition, in the same information coming over again and again, once you've heard one piece.... It's that false idea of hi-tech society and all that which is... doesn't exist. I don't think we're anywhere near that sort of society. It's an enormous myth that's been perpetuated unfortunately, I guess, by readings of what I've done in that rock area at least, and in the consumer area television has an awful lot to answer for with its fabrication of the computer-world myth." Singer Boy George has said that his all-time favourite lyric was "As ugly as a teenage millionaire".

== Other releases ==
The song appeared on the compilation albums The Collection (2005) and iSelect (2008).

== Live versions ==
The song was performed regularly during Bowie's 1995-96 Outside Tour, and two separate live recordings were released on the live albums Ouvre le Chien (Live Dallas 95) (2020) and No Trendy Réchauffé (Live Birmingham 95) (2020).

== Personnel ==
- David Bowie: Lead vocals
- Tony Visconti: Backing vocals
- Robert Fripp: Guitar
- Carlos Alomar: Guitar
- Chuck Hammer: Guitar synthesizer
- Roy Bittan: Piano
- George Murray: Bass guitar
- Dennis Davis: Drums
