= Ashes to Ashes (David Bowie song) =

1980 song by David Bowie

- Original US single

Single by David Bowie

from the album Scary Monsters (and Super Creeps)
- B-side: "Move On"
- Released: 1 August 1980
- Recorded: February–April 1980
- Studio: Power Station (New York City); Good Earth (London)
- Genre: Art rock; art pop; new wave
- Length: 4:23 (album version); 3:35 (single version)
- Label: RCA
- Songwriter: David Bowie
- Producers: David Bowie; Tony Visconti

David Bowie singles chronology
| "Crystal Japan" (1980) | "Ashes to Ashes" (1980) | "Fashion" (1980) |

Music video
- "Ashes to Ashes" on YouTube

"Ashes to Ashes" is a song by the English musician David Bowie from his 14th studio album, Scary Monsters (and Super Creeps) (1980). Co-produced by Bowie and Tony Visconti, it was recorded from February to April 1980 in New York and London and features guitar synthesiser played by Chuck Hammer. "Ashes to Ashes" is an art rock, art pop and new wave song led by a flanged piano riff, and its lyrics act as a sequel to Bowie's 1969 hit "Space Oddity": the astronaut Major Tom has succumbed to drug addiction and floats isolated in space. Bowie partially based the lyrics on his own experiences with drug addiction throughout the 1970s.

Released as the album's lead single on 1 August 1980, "Ashes to Ashes" became Bowie's second No. 1 single on the UK singles chart and his fastest-selling single. The song's music video, co-directed by Bowie and David Mallet, was at the time the most expensive music video ever made. Featuring heavy use of solarised colour, the video presents Bowie as Pierrot, an astronaut and an asylum inmate, each representing variations on the song's theme, and includes appearances from four members of London's Blitz club, including the singer Steve Strange. Influential on the rising New Romantic movement, commentators have considered it one of Bowie's best videos and among the best music videos of all time.

Bowie performed the song only once during 1980 but frequently during his later concert tours. Initially viewed with mixed critical reactions, later reviewers and biographers have considered it one of Bowie's finest songs, particularly praising its unique musical structure. In subsequent decades, the song has appeared on various compilation albums and other artists have covered, sampled or used its musical elements for their own songs. A 2008 BBC television series was later named after it.

== Writing and recording ==
=== Backing tracks ===
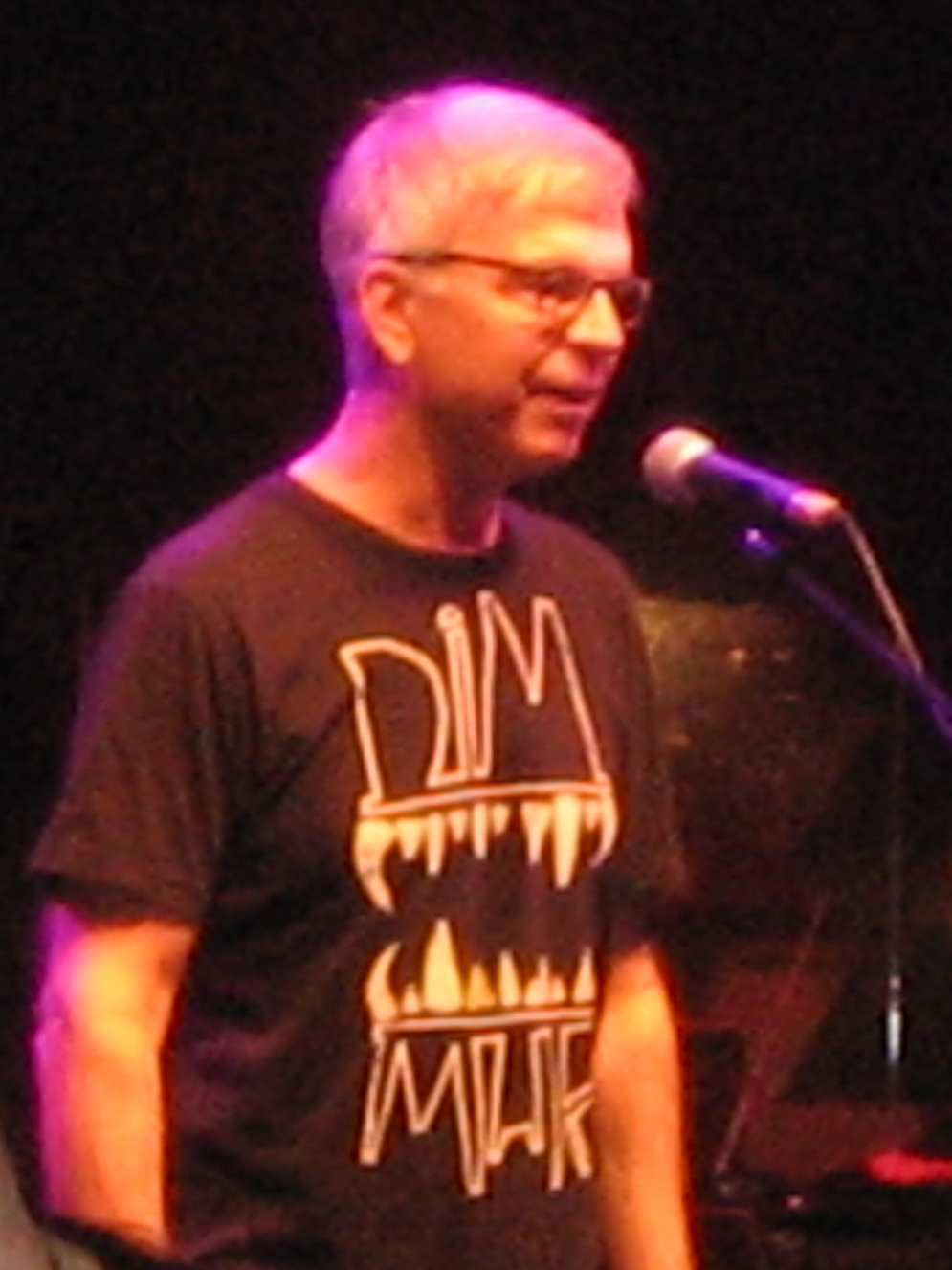
Co-producer Tony Visconti in 2007. He created the piano sound using a flanger.

The sessions for David Bowie's Scary Monsters (and Super Creeps) commenced at the Power Station in New York City in February 1980, with production handled by Bowie and his longtime collaborator Tony Visconti. The backing track for "Ashes to Ashes" was recorded under the working title "People Are Turning to Gold". The core backing band, as on Bowie's previous four albums, consisted of Carlos Alomar on guitar, George Murray on bass and Dennis Davis on drums. Roy Bittan, a member of Bruce Springsteen's E Street Band (who were recording The River in the adjacent studio), contributed piano while the session musician Chuck Hammer played guitar synthesiser. (Note: King Crimson's guitarist Robert Fripp, who contributed guitar to the rest of Scary Monsters, does not appear on "Ashes to Ashes".) Hammer, who dubbed his work "guitarchitecture", had formerly toured with Lou Reed and was hired by Bowie after he sent tapes of his work to him. Visconti stated that Hammer "would pick a note and out of his amplifier would come a symphonic string section".

For their parts, Alomar played "opaque reggae" and Murray played a funk bassline using a mixture of fingerstyle and slapping. Davis initially struggled with the ska-influenced drumbeat. Bowie played the beat he envisioned for the drummer on a chair and cardboard box, which Davis studied and learned, recording the final take the next day. The beat was reportedly inspired by Madness' "My Girl", which had been released a few months prior. Although desiring a Wurlitzer electronic piano to tape Bittan's piano part, Visconti ran a grand piano through an Eventide Instant Flanger to imitate the sound of one upon learning the real Wurlitzer would take too long to deliver. For his parts, Hammer layered four multi-track guitar textures, each given different treatments through the Eventide Harmonizer, which were recorded in the studio's back stairwell to add reverberation. According to the biographer Chris O'Leary, he played "various chord inversions for each chorus section", although Visconti said that "it's the warm string choir you hear on the part that goes, 'I've never done good things, I've never done bad things...'"

=== Vocals and overdubs ===
The backing tracks were recorded without lyrics or melodies pre-written. Unlike his recent Berlin Trilogy, wherein Bowie wrote lyrics almost immediately after the backing tracks were finished, he wanted to take time writing melodies and lyrics for the Scary Monsters songs. Feeling nostalgic, he had the idea of writing a sequel to his first hit "Space Oddity" (1969), a tale about a fictional astronaut named Major Tom, after re-recording the song in 1979 for The "Will Kenny Everett Make It to 1980?" Show. Bowie stated in 1980:

When I originally wrote about Major Tom, I was a very pragmatic and self-opinionated lad that thought he knew all about the great American dream and where it started and where it should stop. Here we had the great blast of American technological know-how shoving this guy up into space, but once he gets there he's not quite sure why he's there. And that's where I left him.

Reconvening in April 1980 at Visconti's own Good Earth Studios in London, Bowie and Visconti recorded the vocal tracks and additional overdubs for the now-titled "Ashes to Ashes". According to the author Peter Doggett, Bowie originally sang "ashes to ashes" as "ashes to ash" and "funk to funky" as "fun to funky" before settling on the final lines. For overdubs, Visconti added additional percussion and contributions from the session keyboardist Andy Clark, who had been introduced to Visconti by the Kenny Everett Show "Space Oddity" drummer Andy Duncan. According to the biographer Nicholas Pegg, Clark "provided the symphonic sounds" that end the song, while O'Leary says his parts are "a high pitch in the chorus". Upon finishing the track, Visconti recalled: "We love[d] it immensely and knew it was one of the major tracks."

== Composition ==
=== Music ===
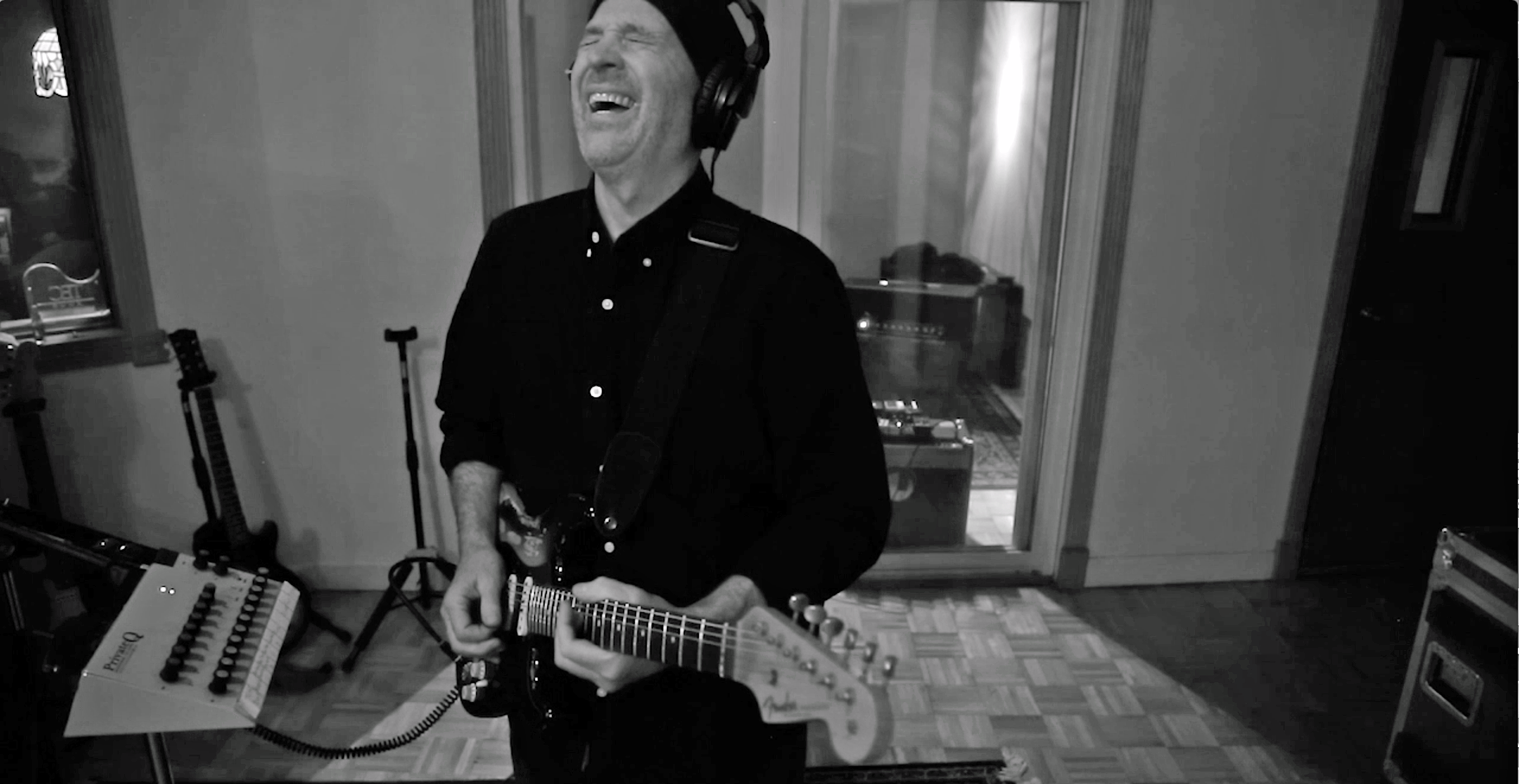
"Ashes to Ashes" features guitar synthesiser by Chuck Hammer (pictured in 2018).

Characterised by commentators as art rock, art pop and new wave; Pegg describes "Ashes to Ashes" a culmination of Bowie's late 1970s experimental period. With a funk rhythm, a guitar synth-led sound and complex vocal layering, the author James E. Perone considers it the most musically accessible song on Scary Monsters and on any Bowie album in several years. The author likens Murray's funky bass playing to the "plastic soul" of Bowie's Young Americans (1975) and Station to Station (1976).

The song's musical structure is unusual, which Perone argues made it stand out in pop music at the time. The main piano riff is a three-bar loop, rather than the more common four-bar loop:

The vocal melody also matches the piano riff through its use of contrasting beats, such as "funk" on the downbeat and "fun-ky" on the off-beat. Visconti called the beat "a mind-bender". Additionally, the vocal melody features contrasting phrasing, meaning the verses consist of unrelated sections, singing through bars ("Major To-om's"), key changes, large vocal register changes and contrasting singing styles. O'Leary comments: "It's as if the conductor of an orchestra is also the lead tenor."

"Ashes to Ashes" takes melodic inspiration from the song "Inchworm" by Danny Kaye, who was one of Bowie's earliest influences. Originating from the 1952 musical film Hans Christian Andersen, Bowie stated in 2003 that the song's chords were some of the first he learned on guitar, calling them "remarkable" and "melancholic": "'Ashes to Ashes' is influenced by that. It's childlike and melancholic in that children's story way." Like "Inchworm", "Ashes to Ashes" contains moves from F to E♭ to close out verses. The song itself is in the key of A♭ major, with the intro and outro featuring "intrusions" of B♭ minor. O'Leary refers to the two bridges as a "series of arcs", as Bowie starts low in his register, rising to high and descending back to low in the same breath. The second verse features dead-pan backing vocals "delay-echoing" the lead vocal.

=== Lyrics ===
It really is an ode to childhood, if you like, a popular nursery rhyme. It's about space men becoming junkies.

— David Bowie, NME, 1980

Melancholic and introspective, the song's lyrics act as a sequel to "Space Oddity", which ends with Major Tom alone floating out in space. Eleven years after liftoff, Ground Control receives a message from Major Tom, who has succumbed to drug addiction and increased paranoia following his abandonment to space: "Strung out in heaven's high / hitting an all-time low." Ground Control are not keen on the astronaut's reappearance – "Oh no, don't say it's true" – and pretend that he is fine, in Doggett's words, mimicking "government agencies everywhere". The astronaut reflects on his life and hopes for the future and wishes he could break free from his "caged psyche". (Note: The line about an axe breaking ice was a paraphrased manifesto from a letter by the writer Franz Kafka that read: "A book must be an ice-axe to break the frozen seas inside us.") His pleas are disregarded by the public, leading him to proclaim that he has "never done good things", has "never done bad things" and "never did anything out of the blue". The song ends with the nursery rhyme lines: "My mother said / to get things done / you'd better not mess with Major Tom."

Described by the artist as "a story of corruption", Bowie wanted to see where Major Tom ended up in the 1970s:

We come to him 10 years later and find the whole thing has soured, because there was no reason for putting him up there ... [So] the most disastrous thing I could think of is that he finds solace in some kind of heroin-type drug, actually cosmic space feeding him: an addiction. He wants to return to the womb from whence he came.

Regarding the song's drug references, Bowie joked about getting the word "junkie" past the BBC's censors in an interview with NME in September 1980. Comparing "Space Oddity" with "Ashes to Ashes", NPR's Jason Heller evaluated the latter's technological undertones compared to the "psychedelically spacious" former. The writer Tom Ewing wrote that it was as if "Major Tom thought he was starring in an Arthur C. Clarke story and found himself in a Philip K. Dick one by mistake, and the result is oddly magnificent".

=== Analysis ===
Reviewers have interpreted "Ashes to Ashes" as commentary on Bowie's own personal struggles with drug addiction throughout the 1970s. (Note: Attributed to multiple references:) Several said that the song represents Bowie's reflection and acknowledgement of the past, at the same time offering hopes for the future. Bowie himself said that the Scary Monsters album was an attempt to "accommodate" his "pasts", as "you have to understand why you went through them". The lyrics describe Major Tom as a junkie who has hit "an all-time low". The NME editors Roy Carr and Charles Shaar Murray interpreted the line as a play on the title of Bowie's 1977 album Low, which charted his withdrawal inwards following his drug excesses in the United States a short time before, another reversal of Major Tom's original withdrawal "outwards" or towards space.

The biographer David Buckley argues that Bowie offered a comment on his entire career "using a rather sarcastic piece of self-deprecation" with the line: "I've never done good things / I've never done bad things / I never did anything out of the blue." Bowie said that these three lines "represent a continuing, returning feeling of inadequacy over what I've done". On the artist's future, Buckley interprets the axe line ("Want an axe to break the ice / Wanna come down right now") as his desire to move into less experimental territory and more "normalised" ground. Years later, Bowie said, "I was wrapping up the seventies really for myself, and that seemed a good enough epitaph for it – that we've lost him, he's out there somewhere, we'll leave him be." Heller agreed, arguing that it provided closure for the artist's "most momentous decade".

== Release ==
"Ashes to Ashes" was released in edited form as the lead single from Scary Monsters on 1 August 1980, with the Lodger track "Move On" (1979) as the B-side. RCA Records emphasised the relationship of "Space Oddity" and "Ashes to Ashes" by releasing a nine-minute promo on 12″ vinyl in the US titled "The Continuing Story of Major Tom", which segued the former into the latter. The British single came in three different picture sleeves, each packaged with four different sheets of adhesive stamps, all featuring Bowie in his Pierrot costume from the music video; Pegg says this was RCA adopting "the craze for limited-edition collectables" that pervaded the 7″ single market at the time. On Scary Monsters, released on 12 September, "Ashes to Ashes" was sequenced in its full-length form as the fourth track on side one of the original LP, between the title track and "Fashion".

=== Commercial performance ===
After years of dwindling commercial fortunes, "Ashes to Ashes" was a return to commercial success for Bowie. Debuting at No. 4 on the UK Singles Chart, the single secured the top spot from ABBA's "The Winner Takes It All" a week later following the music video's broadcast on Top of the Pops. It became Bowie's fastest-selling single up to that point and his second number one single following the 1975 reissue of "Space Oddity".

Compared to the single's strong UK performance, the US release fared worse. With "It's No Game (No. 1)" as the B-side, the US single reached No. 79 on the Cash Box Top 100 chart and No. 101 on the Billboard Bubbling Under the Hot 100 chart. "Ashes to Ashes" was more successful elsewhere, charting at No. 3 in Australia and Norway, 4 on the Irish Singles Chart, 6 in Austria, New Zealand and Sweden, 9 in West Germany, 11 in the Netherlands' Dutch Top 40 and in Switzerland, 15 in Belgium Flanders and the Netherlands' Dutch Single Top 100, and 35 in Canada. The song also reached No. 14 in France in 2016.

=== Critical reception ===
"Ashes to Ashes" initially received mixed reviews from music critics. Amongst positive reviews, a writer for Billboard magazine said the song combines "rock and dance beats" with "tight rock rhythms lay[ing] the groundwork for the nuance-rich melody". In their reviews of the Scary Monsters album, Billboard and The Spokesman-Review's Tom Sowa highlighted "Ashes to Ashes" as one of its best tracks.

On the other hand, Deanne Pearson called the song a "strange choice for a single" in Smash Hits, one that was ultimately "not a hit" and should have been left as an album track. Rolling Stone's Debra Rae Cohen described the song as Bowie's "most explicit self-indictment", and one that mirrors "the malaise of the times". Although Cohen found the track's imagery "chilling", she ultimately felt it was hard to see it "as anything but perverse self-aggrandizement". Ronnie Gurr of Record Mirror was negative, finding the song "not in truth a great effort". Nevertheless, the magazine ranked it the second best single of 1980, behind "Going Underground" by the Jam, while NME ranked the song the fifth best single of the year.

=== Subsequent releases ===
"Ashes to Ashes", in both its single edit and full-length forms, has made appearances on compilation albums. The single edit is included on Changestwobowie (1981), Best of Bowie (2002), The Platinum Collection (2006), Nothing Has Changed (2014) and Legacy (The Very Best of David Bowie) (2016), while the album version is included on the Sound + Vision box set (1989), Changesbowie (1990) and The Singles Collection (1993). The single edit was also included on Re:Call 3, part of the A New Career in a New Town (1977–1982) compilation, in 2017. An unreleased extended version, allegedly 13-minutes long and featuring additional verses, a longer fade-out and a synthesiser solo, is rumoured to exist, although a 12-minute version that appeared on bootlegs was fake, simply repeating and splicing the verses. In 2020, Visconti said that no additional verses were recorded, nor is he aware of any other versions of the song existing.

== Music video ==
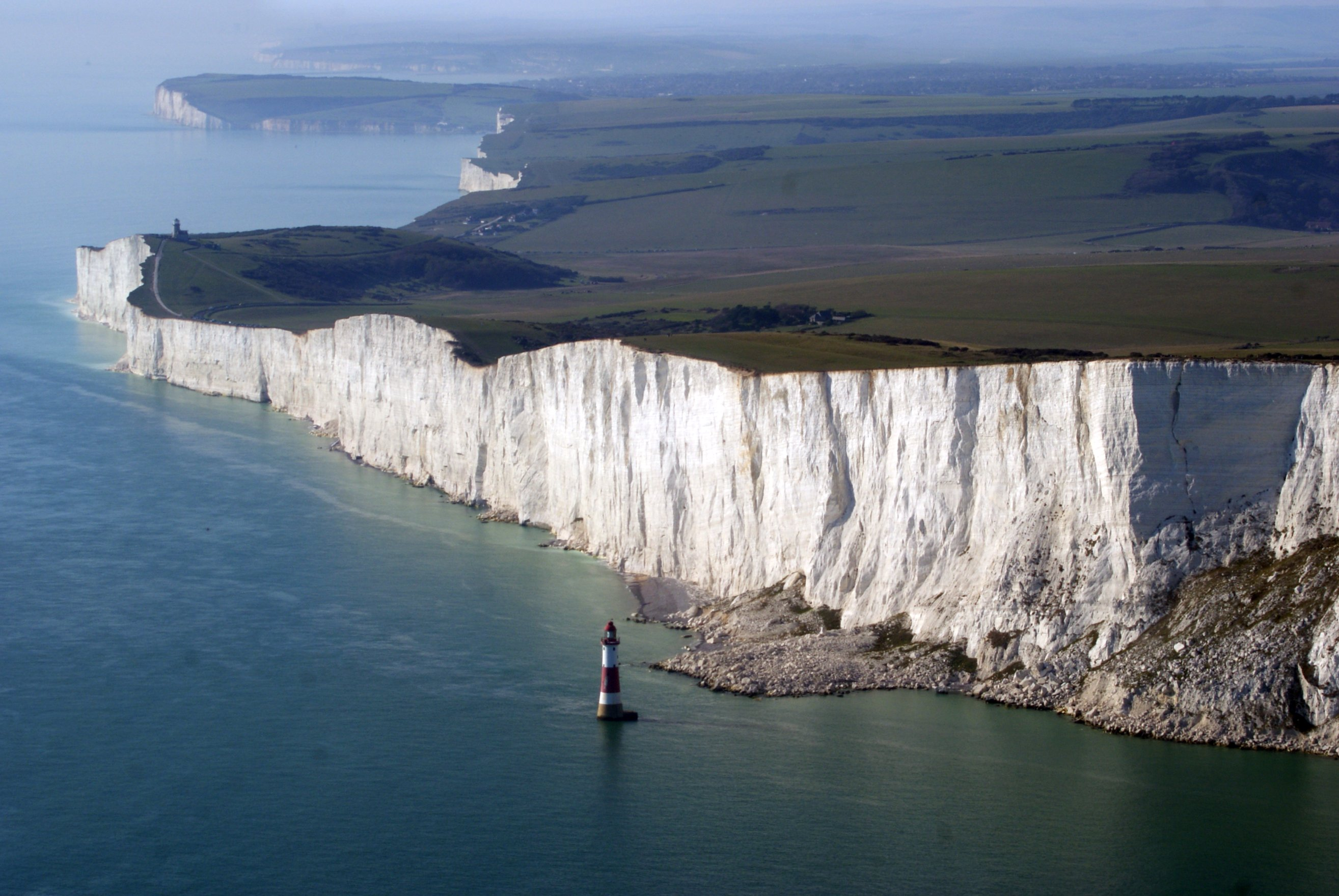
The music video was partly filmed at Beachy Head (pictured in 2011).

The music video for "Ashes to Ashes" was co-directed by Bowie and David Mallet, who had previously directed the videos for the Lodger singles. Filmed at a cost of £250,000, (Note: In The Complete David Bowie, Pegg lists the cost as £25,000.) it was the most expensive music video ever made at the time and has remained one of the most expensive of all time. Shot in May 1980 over a period of three days, (Note: Mallet recalled the "norm" for a video at the time was one day.) Bowie storyboarded the video himself, planning every shot and dictating the editing process. The writer Michael Shore described Mallet's direction as "deliberately overloaded": "demented, horror-movie camera angles, heavy solarisations, neurotic cuts from supersaturated colour to black-and-white."

Filming locations included Beachy Head and Hastings in East Sussex, England. Shooting at the beach was Mallet's idea; he later said: "[It is] one of the very rare places you can get right down to the water and there's a cliff towering over you." The crew found an abandoned bulldozer on the beach and were able to contact its owners and employ the vehicle for the shoot. The "padded cell" and "exploded kitchen" sets were developed from the Kenny Everett Show performance of "Space Oddity", also shot by Mallet, the year prior. Similar to Bowie's other music videos, "Ashes to Ashes" does not tell a story, instead featuring strange images that Buckley compares to a "dreamlike mental state". Discussing the connections between the different locations, Shore states: "[T]he stunningly elegant self-referential video-within-video motif, wherein each new sequence is introduced by Bowie holding a postcard-sized video screen displaying the first shot of the next scene."

In the video, Bowie portrays three different characters – a clown, an astronaut and an asylum inmate – all of whom represent variations of the song's "outsider theme". The black clerical robes of his followers, inspired by the 1965 film The Sound of Music, were designed by Judi Frankland. They were worn by members of London's Blitz, a "Bowie-worshipping nightclub" that housed several up-and-coming artists of the New Romantic era, including Steve Strange, a member of Visage, and future fashion designer Darla Jane Gilroy. (Note: The two others — Elise Brazier and Judith Frankland — were handpicked by Strange. Blitz regular Marilyn and Bowie fan George O'Dowd, later famous as Boy George, were passed over for appearances.) Strange later told the biographer Marc Spitz that his robe kept getting caught in the bulldozer: "That's why I kept doing that move where I pull my arm down. So I wouldn't be crushed." (Note: Bowie liked the move and incorporated it into the videos for his following singles "Fashion" (1980), "Loving the Alien" (1984) and "Dancing in the Street" (1985).) Strange's friend Richard Sharah did Bowie's make-up for both the video and the Scary Monsters photo shoot the previous month, while his Italian Pierrot costume was designed by Natasha Korniloff, whose affiliation with the singer dated back to his days as a mime with Lindsay Kemp in 1968. According to Buckley, the Pierrot figure was based on a commedia dell'arte Renaissance costume. The elderly woman who appears at the video's end, acting as Bowie's mother, was not his actual mother Peggy Jones. (Note: The elderly woman some interpreted as a response to the 1975 NME interview with Bowie's mother, Peggy Jones, which revealed embarrassing personal details between her and the artist; Bowie had repaired his relationship with his mother in the years following the article's publication and before recording "Ashes to Ashes".)

[It conveyed] some feeling of nostalgia for a future. I've always been hung up on that; it creeps into everything I do, however far away I try to get from it ... The idea of having seen the future, of somewhere we've already been, keeps coming back to me.

— David Bowie on the video as a whole

In his book Strange Fascination, Buckley states that the video conveys an "Edwardian queasiness", depicting "a world of nostalgia, childhood reminiscence and distant memories". Buckley and Pegg interpret that Bowie's three characters, archetypes that had permeated his songwriting for a decade, act as an "exorcism of his past". Bowie himself described the shot of him and his followers walking up the shoreline while the bulldozer trails behind them as symbolising "oncoming violence". He also said that the followers have religious undertones, "an ominous quality that's rooted quite deeply". Scenes of the singer in a space suit – which suggested a hospital life-support system – and others showing him locked in what appeared to be a padded room, referred to both Major Tom and to Bowie's new, rueful interpretation of him. The former scenes were "intentionally" derived from H. R. Giger's designs for the 1979 film Alien.

== Live performances ==
Bowie performed "Ashes to Ashes" only once in 1980, on 3 September for an appearance on NBC's The Tonight Show Starring Johnny Carson. In subsequent decades, Bowie performed the song on the 1983 Serious Moonlight, 1990 Sound+Vision, 1999 Hours, 2002 Heathen, and 2003–2004 A Reality tours. A Serious Moonlight performance, recorded on 12 September 1983, was included on the live album Serious Moonlight (Live '83), released as part of the Loving the Alien (1983–1988) box set in 2018 and separately the following year. The filmed performance also appears on the concert video Serious Moonlight (1984). Bowie's 25 June 2000 performance of the song at the Glastonbury Festival was released in 2018 on Glastonbury 2000, while a recording from a special performance at the BBC Radio Theatre in London on 27 June 2000 was released on the bonus disc of Bowie at the Beeb. A performance from the Montreux Jazz Festival on 18 July 2002 was released on the box set I Can't Give Everything Away (2002–2016) in 2025. Another live recording from the A Reality Tour, recorded in Dublin in November 2003, is included on the tour's accompanying DVD and live album. Although O'Leary believes no live performances ever came close to matching the studio recording's quality, Pegg believes "Ashes to Ashes" made "successful transitions" to the stage.

== Legacy ==
It's certainly one of the better songs that I've ever written.

— David Bowie, 1999

In later decades, reviewers and biographers consider "Ashes to Ashes" one of Bowie's best songs. Praise is given to its musicality and unique structure; the author Paul Trynka, in particular, attributes the song's success to its "melodic inventiveness". O'Leary says that the track's structure "seems built by a surrealist watchmaker" due to the details present in the mix, deeming it one of Bowie's finest studio recordings. Writing for Consequence of Sound, Nina Corcoran stated the song "makes the most of Bowie's musical creativity" and overall represents "an ode to the '70s". American Songwriter's Jim Beviglia called the song a "dark masterpiece". Rhino Entertainment argued the song predicted the subsequent decade with its "ominous clash of synthesized guitars, hard funk bassline and dissonant guitars".

Some critics analysed the song against Bowie's entire career. O'Leary says that while his career was far from over when the song was released, "Ashes to Ashes" is "his last song" or "the closing chapter that comes midway through the book". He concludes: "Bowie sings himself onstage with a children's rhyme: eternally falling, eternally young." The Guardian's Alexis Petridis said the song represents a moment in his catalogue where "the correct response is to stand back and boggle in awe", because "everything about it – [its] lingering oddness of its sound, its constantly shifting melody and emotional tenor, its alternately self-mythologising and self-doubting lyrics – is perfect". Chris Gerard of PopMatters even considered the track one of Bowie's signature songs.

Following Bowie's death in January 2016, Rolling Stone named "Ashes to Ashes" one of the 30 most essential songs of the artist's catalogue. The magazine wrote: "As offbeat as the song was, it's a testament to Bowie's art-pop genius that 'Ashes to Ashes' became a huge international hit." The song has appeared on lists of Bowie's greatest songs by The Telegraph, The Guardian (No. 2), behind "Sound and Vision" (1977), Digital Spy (No. 3), Uncut (No. 6), Smooth Radio (No. 7), NME (No. 9), Mojo (No. 10) and Consequence of Sound (No. 30). In 2016, Ultimate Classic Rock placed the single at number 10 in a list ranking every Bowie single from worst to best. Two years later, NME readers voted it Bowie's third best track, behind "All the Young Dudes" (1972) and "Life on Mars?" (1971).

=== Covers and influence ===
Artists who have covered "Ashes to Ashes" live or in-studio include Tears for Fears for the 1992 Ruby Trax charity album, Uwe Schmidt, Northern Kings, the Shins, the Mike Flowers Pops, John Wesley Harding, Magdalena Bay, and Warpaint. Songs that used musical elements or lyrics from "Ashes to Ashes" include Marilyn Manson's "Apple of Sodom" (1997), Landscape's "Einstein a Go-Go" (1981) and Keane's "Better Than This" (2008). Songs that directly sampled "Ashes to Ashes" include Samantha Mumba's UK top five hit "Body II Body" (2000) and James Murphy's remix of Bowie's 2013 single "Love Is Lost". The song was the namesake for the 2008 BBC sequel series to their time-travelling crime drama Life on Mars, which itself took its name from another Bowie song "Life on Mars?"; an apparition of the clown from the video regularly appeared to the main character Alex Drake (Keeley Hawes) during the show's first series.

The music video has also received praise and recognition as a major influence on the then-rising New Romantic movement. Initially voted by Record Mirror's readers as the best music video of 1980, together with "Fashion", Rolling Stone placed it at number 44 in their list of the 100 best music videos of all time in 2021. Discussing the video's influence upon its release, Andy Greene wrote: "MTV came onto the airwaves exactly one year later, and it would give rise to a whole new generation of Bowie imitators, but none of them could compete with the real deal." Dig! website also included the visual in their list of 20 essential clips of the 1980s. Luke Edwards argued that the video "truly captured the spirit of the MTV age" before the channel's golden era.

Commentators hail the video as not only one of Bowie's finest, but one of the medium's high points. Considered "the defining early music video" by Buckley, and "one of the most significant and influential of the age" by Dave Thompson, its techniques and effects influenced videos of artists including Adam Ant, Duran Duran and the Cure. Pegg argues the visual "define[d] rock video for the early 1980s", while Heller contended it proved music videos were "viable promotional investments". Videos that later mimicked or took appropriation from the "Ashes to Ashes" video included Peter Gabriel's "Shock the Monkey" (1982), Erasure's "Chorus" (1991) and Marilyn Manson's "The Dope Show" (1998).

== Personnel ==
According to Chris O'Leary and Benoît Clerc:

- David Bowie – lead and backing vocals, electric piano
- Chuck Hammer – Roland GR-500 guitar synthesiser
- Carlos Alomar – electric guitar
- Andy Clark – Minimoog and Yamaha CS-80 synthesisers
- Roy Bittan – flanged piano
- George Murray – bass guitar
- Dennis Davis – drums
- Tony Visconti – shaker, percussion

Technical

- David Bowie – producer
- Tony Visconti – producer, engineer
- Larry Alexander – engineer
- Jeff Hendrickson – engineer

== Charts ==
=== Weekly charts ===
1980–1981 chart performance for "Ashes to Ashes"
| Chart (1980–1981) | Peak position |
|---|---|
| Australia (Kent Music Report) | 3 |
| Austria (Ö3 Austria Top 40) | 6 |
| Belgium (Ultratop 50 Flanders) | 15 |
| Canada Top Singles (RPM) | 35 |
| Ireland (IRMA) | 4 |
| Netherlands (Dutch Top 40) | 11 |
| Netherlands (Single Top 100) | 15 |
| France (IFOP) | 1 |
| New Zealand (Recorded Music NZ) | 6 |
| Norway (VG-lista) | 3 |
| Portugal (AFP) | 2 |
| Spain (AFE) | 29 |
| Sweden (Sverigetopplistan) | 6 |
| Switzerland (Schweizer Hitparade) | 11 |
| UK Singles (OCC) | 1 |
| US Bubbling Under Hot 100 (Billboard) | 101 |
| US Disco Top 100 (Billboard) | 21 |
| US Cash Box Top 100 Singles | 79 |
| West Germany (GfK) | 9 |

2016 chart performance for "Ashes to Ashes"
| Chart (2016) | Peak position |
|---|---|
| France (SNEP) | 14 |

=== Year-end charts ===
Year-end chart performance for "Ashes to Ashes"
| Chart (1980) | Position |
|---|---|
| Australia (Kent Music Report) | 25 |
| UK Singles (OCC) | 14 |

== Certifications ==
Certifications for "Ashes to Ashes"
| Region | Certification | Certified units/sales |
|---|---|---|
| France | — | 200,000 |
| New Zealand (RMNZ) | Gold | 15,000^{‡} |
| United Kingdom (BPI) 1980 release | Silver | 250,000^{^} |
| United Kingdom (BPI) 2004 release | Gold | 400,000^{‡} |
^{^} Shipments figures based on certification alone.^{‡} Sales+streaming figures based on certification alone.
