= Fashion (David Bowie song) =

1980 song by David Bowie

Single by David Bowie

from the album Scary Monsters (and Super Creeps)
- B-side: "Scream Like a Baby"
- Released: 24 October 1980
- Recorded: February–April 1980
- Studio: Power Station (New York City); Good Earth (London)
- Genre: New wave; post-punk; dance; funk
- Length: 4:46 (album version); 3:23 (single version)
- Label: RCA
- Songwriter: David Bowie
- Producers: David Bowie; Tony Visconti

David Bowie singles chronology
"Ashes to Ashes" (1980)	"Fashion" (1980)	"Scary Monsters (And Super Creeps)" (1981)

Music video
- "Fashion" on YouTube

"Fashion" is a song by the English musician David Bowie from his fourteenth studio album Scary Monsters (and Super Creeps). Co-produced by Bowie and Tony Visconti and recorded from February to April 1980 at New York and London, it was the last song completed for the album. It originated as a reggae parody titled "Jamaica", and King Crimson guitarist Robert Fripp contributes lead guitar.

Lyrically, "Fashion" acts as both a celebration of fashion trends and Bowie's critique of the individuals who mandate strict observance to those trends, who are labelled fascists and the "goon squad". Its accompanying music video, directed by David Mallet, reflects the lyrical themes, depicting Bowie and his musicians as street thugs interspersed with shots of dancers rehearsing and a parade of New Romantic individuals. Like "Ashes to Ashes", it was critically praised.

Released by RCA Records in edited form as the second single from the album on 24 October 1980, "Fashion" charted at No. 5 on the UK singles chart and No. 70 on the US Billboard Hot 100. Bowie performed the song during his concert tours, which have appeared on live concert videos. In subsequent decades, the song has appeared on lists of Bowie's best songs, on compilation albums and been covered by several artists.

== Writing and recording ==
The sessions for David Bowie's Scary Monsters (and Super Creeps) commenced at the Power Station in New York City in February 1980, with production by Bowie and longtime collaborator Tony Visconti. "Fashion" began as a basic reggae parody under the working title "Jamaica". The band, like Bowie's four previous albums, consisted of Carlos Alomar on rhythm guitar, George Murray on bass and Dennis Davis on drums. Roy Bittan, a member of Bruce Springsteen's E Street Band who were recording The River (1980) in the adjacent studio, played piano. King Crimson guitarist Robert Fripp, who played guitar on "Heroes" (1977), played lead on "Fashion".

The backing tracks were recorded without lyrics or melodies pre-written. Unlike his recent Berlin Trilogy, wherein Bowie wrote lyrics almost immediately after the backing tracks were finished, he wanted to take time writing melodies and lyrics for the Scary Monsters songs; he and Visconti reconvened at the latter's own Good Earth Studios in London in April 1980 for vocals and overdubs. Bowie initially struggled to write words for "Fashion" and considered scrapping it entirely, before Visconti intervened: "I implored him to write a lyric because this was probably the most modern and commercial-sounding track on the album. He returned the next day announcing, 'I've got it!'"

"Fashion" was the last song completed during the Scary Monsters sessions, and mixing started the same evening. Session keyboardist Andy Clark contributed what biographer Nicholas Pegg calls the track's "distinctive 'whoop whoop' intro", which was a reference signal on Clark's synthesiser. Visconti later said: "It ended up as a kind of reggae upstroke for most of the song." Aspects of the track came from past, unreleased material. The recurring "beep beep" Bowie had first used in a 1970 composition called "Rupert the Riley", while the phrase "people from bad homes" came from the title of a track off a 1973 album he recorded with the Astronettes.

== Music and lyrics ==
[That song was] to do with that dedication to fashion. I was trying to move on a little from that Ray Davies concept of fashion; to suggest more of a gritted teeth determination and an unsureness about why one's doing it.

— David Bowie, NME, 1980

A new wave, post-punk, dance and funk track with reggae elements, "Fashion" contains structural similarities to Bowie's 1975 hit "Golden Years". (Note: Pegg remarks that "you can hum the one along to the other with no problem at all".) Fripp's guitar riff, which the guitarist himself described as "blues-rock played with a contemporary grammar", was compared by author Peter Doggett to John Lennon's "Cold Turkey" (1970). Doggett also identifies elements that suggest possible inspirations from other songs, including the "mechanical structure" of M's "Pop Muzik" (1979) and the "nonsense syllables" of Talking Heads' "Psycho Killer" (1977) in the final verse. Author James E. Perone further likened "Fashion"'s commercial, danceable sound to Talking Heads, referring to it as "the best David Bowie song that David Byrne never wrote".

With "Fashion", Bowie intended to update the Kinks' "Dedicated Follower of Fashion", as well as his own compositions "Join the Gang" and "Maid of Bond Street", to a 1980 setting. He explained:

When I first started going to discos in New York in the early 70s, there was a very high-powered enthusiasm and [the scene] had a natural course about it. [It] seems now to be replaced by an insidious grim determination to be fashionable, as though it's actually a vocation. There's some kind of strange aura about it.

In The Words and Music of David Bowie, Perone interprets the lyrics of "Fashion" as both a celebration of fashion trends and Bowie's critique of the individuals who "demand strict adherence" to those trends. Although Bowie himself insisted the song was not political, his labelling of the strict individuals as fascists and the "goon squad", and lyrics such as "turn to the left, turn to the right", made commentators interpret otherwise. Pegg says the "turn to the left, turn to the right" chorus and the "listen to me, don't listen to me" middle eight both "reflect Bowie's shifting fortunes as a celebrity figurehead and style guru over the preceding decade". Biographer David Buckley believes the song "poked fun at the banality of the dance-floor and the style fascists" of the New Romantic movement. A handwritten lyric sheet, later displayed at the David Bowie Is exhibition, revealed the song's original violent undertones with lyrics such as "Hell up ahead, burn a flag / Shake a fist, start a fight / If you're covered in blood / You're doing it right" and "We'll break every bone / We'll turn you upside down".

== Music video ==
David Mallet shot a music video for "Fashion" in a New York nightclub owned by his friend Robert Boykin called Hurrah. (Note: It was shot in New York due to Bowie's appearance in the play The Elephant Man. The Hurrah nightclub was also depicted in the film Christiane F., whose soundtrack featured several Bowie songs.) The video depicts Bowie and his backing musicians, played by Alomar, Hall & Oates guitarist G. E. Smith, bassist John Kumnick and the Rumour drummer Stephen Goulding, (Note: Smith and Goulding had recently appeared with Bowie on The Tonight Show Starring Johnny Carson.) as street-tough guys interposed with shots of dancers rehearsing and a parade of New Romantic individuals queuing outside a soup kitchen, one of whom was May Pang, the ex-girlfriend of Lennon and future wife of Visconti.

In his book The Complete David Bowie, Pegg says the video "crystallises the song's anxiety about misplaced idolatry and style-leadership". Amid a series of facial contortions and other gestures, Bowie made use of a move he had employed in the video for "Ashes to Ashes": slowly crouching and bringing his arm down to the ground in a slow vertical arc. By the video's end, all the dancers are copying the move, implying that the people have submitted to his actions. According to Pegg, Bowie's distaste for this occurrence is a prevalent theme through Scary Monsters. One sequence, where Bowie appears both on stage and as a fan, he utilised further for the "Blue Jean" promo film Jazzin' for Blue Jean in 1984. Buckley argues the scene encapsulates Bowie's feelings on the icon–fan relationship, and a visual personification of his live shows throughout the 1970s. Praised by critics, Record Mirror readers voted "Fashion" and "Ashes to Ashes" the best music videos of 1980.

== Release and reception ==
"Fashion" first appeared in its full, almost five-minute long form on Scary Monsters, released on 12 September 1980, as the final track on side one of the original LP, following "Ashes to Ashes". A month later on 24 October, RCA Records issued it in edited form as the second single from the album, with the catalogue number RCA BOW 7 and album track "Scream Like a Baby" as the B-side; this single edit cuts an entire guitar solo. The UK sleeve design was adapted for the cover art of the 1980 compilation The Best of Bowie. Debuting on the UK singles chart at No. 20, it peaked at No. 5. In America, it placed low on the Billboard Hot 100 at No. 70. London's Blitz Kids adopted "Fashion" as their anthem, unaware of the song's ironic dig towards them.

Record World said of it that "Bowie's vocal undercurrents are exotically hypnotic." NME ranked "Fashion" the eighth best song of 1980. Deemed by one of the finest songs on Scary Monsters by AllMusic's Dave Thompson, publications who have ranked "Fashion" one of Bowie's best songs include Mojo (No. 18), The Guardian (No. 21), Consequence of Sound (No. 23) and NME (No. 36). In 2016, Ultimate Classic Rock placed the single at number 20 in a list ranking every Bowie single from worst to best in 2016.

== Live performances ==
Bowie performed the song on most of his tours after 1980, including the Serious Moonlight Tour (1983), Glass Spider Tour (1987), Sound+Vision Tour (1990), Earthling Tour (1997), Heathen Tour (2002), and A Reality Tour (2003–2004). He also sang the song with Frank Black for his fiftieth birthday concert in 1997. According to Pegg, this version featured "an aggressively visceral bassline" and was accompanied by "a shocking set of skin-flick back-projections". As a live song, Thompson says that the song turned into one of Bowie's "most reliably malleable numbers."

The song appears on two of his live concert videos: Serious Moonlight (1983) and Glass Spider (1988), and on the live album Look at the Moon! (Live Phoenix Festival 97) (2021).

== Legacy ==
"Fashion" has made appearances on compilation albums. Its single edit was included on Changestwobowie (1981), Best of Bowie (2002), The Best of David Bowie 1980/1987 (2007) and the two-disc version of Bowie Legacy (2016); an entirely new single edit, which Pegg refers to as an "alarmingly slapdash effort", appeared on the extended two-disc and three-disc versions of Nothing Has Changed (2014). Its full-length album version was included on Changesbowie (1990) and The Singles Collection (1993). Both edits were also remastered and included in the A New Career in a New Town (1977–1982) compilation in 2017.

Several artists have covered "Fashion" since its release. In 1998, Glamma Kid released a rap version titled "Fashion '98" for his album Kidology, which was a minor UK hit. In 2003, the Dandy Warhols sampled on the song for their Welcome to the Monkey House track "I Am a Scientist"; Bowie received a co-writing credit. Three years later, a cover by MGA Entertainment's Bratz line of fashion dolls, titled "Ooooh Fashion" with a new verse melody and lyrics ("We are the Bratz and now we're coming to town"), was included on the album Forever Diamondz (2006). Additionally, the Spice Girls performed "Fashion" on their 2008 The Return of the Spice Girls comeback tour, and the cast of Glee covered it for Vogue magazine in 2011. Trent Reznor, Mariqueen Maandig and Atticus Ross also covered it for Mike Garson's 2021 Bowie tribute event A Bowie Celebration: Just For One Day.

Bowie's original recording appeared in the soundtracks for the films Clueless (1995) and Raising Helen (2004). "Fashion" was also used for a tribute to the British fashion industry during the closing ceremony of the 2012 London Olympics. Pegg remarks that the event "either ignored or was unaware of the song's scathing sense of irony".

== Personnel ==
According to Chris O'Leary:

- David Bowie – lead and backing vocals
- Robert Fripp – lead guitar
- Carlos Alomar – rhythm guitar
- George Murray – bass guitar
- Dennis Davis – drums
- Andy Clark – Minimoog, Yamaha CS-80 synthesiser

Technical

- David Bowie – producer
- Tony Visconti – producer, engineer
- Larry Alexander – engineer
- Jeff Hendrickson – engineer

== Charts ==
Chart performance for "Fashion"
Chart (1980–1981)	Peak position
Australia (Kent Music Report)	27
France (IFOP)	38
Irish Singles Chart	11
New Zealand (Recorded Music NZ)	22
Norway (VG-lista)	9
South African Chart	8
Sweden (Sverigetopplistan)	7
UK (Official Charts Company)	5
US Billboard Hot 100	70
US Dance Club Songs (Billboard)	21
West Germany (GfK)	34

== Certifications ==
Certifications for "Fashion"
Region	Certification	Certified units/sales
United Kingdom (BPI)	Silver	250,000^{^}
^{^} Shipments figures based on certification alone.
