= Charles Shaar Murray =

English music journalist and broadcaster (born 1951)

- Born: Charles Maximillian Murray; 27 June 1951 (age 75); Reading, Berkshire, England
- Education: Reading Grammar School
- Occupations: Journalist, writer, broadcaster
- Years active: 1970–present
- Employer: Guitarist

Charles Shaar Murray (born Charles Maximillian Murray; 27 June 1951) is an English music journalist and broadcaster. He has worked on the New Musical Express (NME) and many other magazines and newspapers, and has been interviewed for a number of television documentaries and reports on music.

== Early life ==
Murray grew up in Reading, Berkshire, England, where he attended Reading School and learned to play the harmonica and guitar.

== Career ==
Murray's first experience in journalism came in 1970, when he was one of a number of schoolchildren who responded to an invitation to edit the April issue of the satirical magazine Oz. He thus contributed to the notorious Schoolkids OZ issue and was involved in the consequent obscenity trial. He wrote for International Times, before moving, in 1972, to the New Musical Express (NME), for which he wrote until around 1986. He subsequently worked for a number of publications including Q magazine, Mojo, MacUser, The New Statesman, Prospect, The Guardian, The Observer, The Daily Telegraph, Vogue and The Independent. He also began writing a monthly column about his lifelong love affair with guitars in Guitarist magazine.

Murray sang and played guitar and harmonica as Blast Furnace in the band Blast Furnace and the Heatwaves and performed with London blues band Crosstown Lightnin'.

== Political views ==
Murray was a supporter of the Labour Party under Jeremy Corbyn's leadership and was a signatory to an open letter to The Guardian in April 2016 that denied antisemitism was "rife" in the party.

== Bibliography ==
In addition to his magazine work, Murray has written a number of books.

Non-fiction

- David Bowie: An Illustrated Record (1981), with Roy Carr, ISBN 0-906008-25-5
- Crosstown Traffic: Jimi Hendrix and Post-War Pop (1989), a musical biography of Jimi Hendrix, ISBN 0-571-20749-9; won the Ralph Gleason Music Book Award
- Shots From The Hip (1991), ISBN 0-14-012341-5, selected writings from his first two decades as a journalist
- Blues on CD: The Essential Guide (1993), ISBN 1-85626-084-4
- Boogie Man: Adventures of John Lee Hooker in the American 20th Century (1999), a biography of John Lee Hooker, ISBN 0-14-016890-7; shortlisted for the Gleason award.

Novels

- The Hellhound Sample (2011), ISBN 1-900486-78-4

== Broadcasting ==
Murray's broadcasting credits include:

- The Seven Ages of Rock (BBC2, 2007) as series consultant and interviewee
- The South Bank Show (ITV, 2006) Dusty Springfield – interviewee
- Inky Fingers: The NME Story (BBC2, 2005) – interviewee
- Dancing in the Street (BBC2) – series consultant
- Jazz From Hell: Frank Zappa (BBC Radio 3) writer and presenter
- Punk Jazz: Jaco Pastorius (BBC R3) writer and presenter
- The Life and Crimes of Lenny Bruce (BBC R3) writer and presenter
