= Beggars Opera (band) =

Scottish progressive rock band

- Genre: Progressive rock
- Years active: 1969–1976
- Labels: Vertigo; Verve (US)
- Past members: Ricky Gardiner; Alan Park; Raymond Wilson; Martin Griffiths; Marshall Erskine; Gordon Sellar; Pete Scott; Linnie Paterson; Virginia Scott; Mike Travis; Clem Cattini
- Website: beggarsopera.co.uk

Beggars Opera was a Scottish progressive rock band from Glasgow, Scotland, formed in 1969 by guitarist Ricky Gardiner, vocalist Martin Griffiths, and bassist Marshall Erskine.

== Career ==
After working together building parts of the M40 motorway near Beaconsfield, the three founder members moved back to Glasgow to look for an organist and drummer and recruited Alan Park and Raymond Wilson. After rehearsing they took up residency at Burns Howff club/pub in West Regent Street in the centre of Glasgow.

In 1970, after signing to Vertigo Records, the band recorded their first album, Act One, and a single, "Sarabande", which charted in several European countries. Tours of Europe followed and the band found success in Germany, appearing on German TV's Beat-Club, then at the first British Rock Meeting in Speyer in September 1971. The following year, for their second album, Waters of Change, the band were joined by Virginia Scott on Mellotron and bassist Gordon Sellar. The single "Time Machine" from that album was successful in Germany, where the band toured extensively.

Erskine left the band before they recorded their third album, Pathfinder (1972), which included a cover version of Richard Harris' hit "MacArthur Park". Several other personnel changes ensued, with Pete Scott replacing Griffiths in 1972, and Linnie Paterson replacing Pete Scott in 1973. By 1973's final album, Get Your Dog Off Me, Beggars Opera were reduced to a trio of Gardiner, Park and Sellar.

In 1974/76 a new version of Beggars Opera recorded two albums for Jupiter Records in Germany: Sagittary, featuring Gardiner (guitar), Pete Scott (vocals), Virginia Scott (Keyboards and Backing Vox) and Mike Travis (drums), and Beggars Can't Be Choosers with Clem Cattini replacing Travis on drums.

Gardiner went on to play for David Bowie on the Low album, and with Iggy Pop on the Lust for Life album as well as his Idiot tour of 1976. He co-wrote "The Passenger" with Iggy Pop.

In 2000 Ricky Gardiner upgraded Beggars Opera and produced/ released 10 new art rock albums with personnel Ricky Gardiner/ Guitars, Virginia Scott Vocals /Keyboards and Tom Gardiner/ Drums on RGS (Ricky Gardiner Songs) including covers of The Passenger(song). Close to my Heart and Lose a Life (a rock opera) were also released on Repertoire Records, Germany who also released Sagittary and Beggars Can't be Choosers. In 2023 RGS released Beggars Opera The Leap from the Beggars Opera archives

== Solo projects ==
In November 2025, Beggars Opera co-founder and vocalist Martin Griffiths released his first solo album, The Beggar. It features songs he originally wrote in the 1970s, now arranged and recorded with his son Philip Griffiths’ band Alias Eye and musician Maxi Sator, combining elements of rock, pop, ballads and Latin rhythms with a singer-songwriter approach. The album also includes a short version of Time Machine, originally co-written with Ricky Gardiner and Alan Park during Griffiths' time with Beggars Opera, and some selected 1970s acoustic bonus tracks.

== Discography ==
- 1970 Act One
- 1971 Waters of Change
- 1972 Pathfinder
- 1973 Get Your Dog Off Me!
- 1974 Sagittary
- 1975 Beggars Can't Be Choosers
- 1980 Lifeline
- 1996 The Final Curtain (compilation)
- 2007 Close to My Heart
- 2009 Touching the Edge
- 2010 All Tomorrows Thinking
- 2010 Suddenly Ahead Ahead
- 2011 Lose a Life
- 2011 Promise in Motion
- 2012 Mrs. Calagari's Lighter
