= The Passenger (Iggy Pop song) =

1977 song by Iggy Pop

- B-side label

Single by Iggy Pop

from the album Lust for Life
- A-side: "Success"
- Released: September 30, 1977
- Recorded: May–June 1977
- Studio: Hansa (West Berlin)
- Genre: Garage rock; proto-punk
- Length: 4:44
- Label: RCA
- Songwriters: Iggy Pop; Ricky Gardiner
- Producer: Bewlay Bros.

Music video
- "The Passenger" on YouTube

"The Passenger" is a song written by Iggy Pop and Ricky Gardiner, recorded and released by Pop on the Lust for Life album in 1977. It was also released as the B-side of the album's first single, "Success". It was released as a single in its own right in March 1998, reaching number 22 in the UK charts.

== Background and composition ==
"The Passenger" was co-written by Iggy Pop and guitarist Ricky Gardiner; Pop wrote the lyrics, while Gardiner composed the music. Gardiner thought of the riff in early 1977 as he was wandering throughout the countryside, "in the field beside an orchard, on one of those glorious spring days with the trees in full blossom." The song was recorded at Hansa Studio by the Wall in West Berlin between May and June 1977. The lineup consisted of Pop, Gardiner, David Bowie on piano, Carlos Alomar on guitar, and brothers Tony and Hunt Sales on bass and drums, respectively. Bowie, Pop, and producer-engineer Colin Thurston produced Lust for Life under the pseudonym "Bewlay Bros.", named after the final track on Bowie's 1971 album Hunky Dory.

Similar to other tracks on Lust for Life, the lyrics for "The Passenger" were mostly composed on the spot in the studio. They were inspired by a Jim Morrison poem, titled "The Lords", that saw "modern life as a journey by car", as well as by rides on the Berlin S-Bahn, according to Pop's former girlfriend Esther Friedmann. The lyrics have been interpreted as "Iggy's knowing commentary on Bowie's cultural vampirism". In an interview with The Guardian in 2016, Pop said "The Passenger" was partly inspired by touring with Bowie: "I'd been riding around North America and Europe in David's car ad infinitum. I didn't have a driver's licence or a vehicle". Biographer Paul Trynka states that the song was "a simple celebration of life", of the "long walks" Pop would take growing up and his own reputation at the time. Tom Maginnis of AllMusic described the music as a "laid-back ... springy groove". Reviewers characterize the track as garage rock and proto-punk.

== Release and reception ==
RCA Records issued Lust for Life on September 9, 1977, with "The Passenger" as the fourth track on side one of the original LP, between "Some Weird Sin" and "Tonight". The song was released as the B-side of "Success" in October 1977, but failed to chart. Pop's press officer Robin Eggar attempted to pursue RCA to issue "The Passenger" as an A-side, feeling it would be a hit, but he was ignored. Following its use in a car commercial two decades later, the song was released as an A-side by Virgin Records in March 1998 with "Lust for Life" and The Idiot track "Nightclubbing", with the catalog number 7243 8 94921 2 5. The single peaked at number 22 on the UK Singles Chart and remained on the chart for three weeks.

"The Passenger" has remained a mainstay of Pop's live performances. The song received an official music video in 2020, 43 years after its initial release.

"The Passenger" has appeared on several best-of lists. In a 2001 list compiling "the 100 Greatest Singles of the Post-Punk Era", the writers of Uncut magazine placed "The Passenger" at number 95. The staff of Billboard placed the song at number 78 in a list compiling "the 100 Greatest Car Songs of All Time" in 2016. The same year, Pitchfork ranked it the 95th best song of the 1970s. Benjamin Scheim wrote: "It's easy to listen to the intro and envision a million bands at home trying to figure out how to copy it." The song was also included in the 2008 book The Pitchfork 500.

== In media ==
- In 2009, New Zealand broadband internet provider Orcon held a promotion where eight fans re-recorded the song via the internet. The recording featured instruments foreign to the original, such as a flute.
- In 2010, the German mobile phone provider T-Mobile launched their "Welcome Home" flash-mob advert on British television. Amongst the songs performed using only voices was "The Passenger", sung by local Brighton resident George Ikediashi.
- A cover of the song by The Phoenix Foundation was used in Tourism New Zealand's "One journey leads to another" campaign in 2017.

== Personnel ==
According to Chris O'Leary and Thomas Jerome Seabrook:

- Iggy Pop – lead vocals
- David Bowie – piano, backing vocals
- Ricky Gardiner – lead guitar
- Carlos Alomar – rhythm guitar
- Tony Sales – bass, backing vocals
- Hunt Sales – drums, percussion, backing vocals

Production

- Iggy Pop – producer
- David Bowie – producer
- Colin Thurston – producer, engineer

== Certifications ==
Region	Certification	Certified units/sales
Germany (BVMI)	Gold	250,000^{‡}
Italy (FIMI)	Platinum	50,000^{‡}
New Zealand (RMNZ)	Platinum	30,000^{‡}
Spain (Promusicae)	Platinum	60,000^{‡}
United Kingdom (BPI)	Platinum	600,000^{‡}
^{‡} Sales+streaming figures based on certification alone.

== Siouxsie and the Banshees version ==
"The Passenger"

Single by Siouxsie and the Banshees

from the album Through the Looking Glass
- B-side: "She's Cuckoo"; "Something Blue"
- Released: March 16, 1987
- Recorded: 1986
- Genre: Alternative rock; pop
- Length: 5:09
- Label: Polydor
- Songwriters: Iggy Pop; Ricky Gardiner
- Producers: Siouxsie and the Banshees; Mike Hedges

Siouxsie and the Banshees singles chronology
"This Wheel's on Fire" (1987)	"The Passenger" (1987)	"Song from the Edge of the World" (1987)

Music video
- "The Passenger" on YouTube

English rock band Siouxsie and the Banshees covered "The Passenger" in 1987 for their all-cover-versions album Through the Looking Glass. The group revamped the song by adding brass arrangements. Released as the second single from the album, it peaked at number 41 in the UK.

Iggy Pop praised their version and stated: "That's good. She sings it well and she threw a little note in when she sings it, that I wish I had thought of, it's kind of improved it [...]. The horn thing is good."

The song was featured at the end of the biographical film I, Tonya (2017), and over the end credits of the fourth episode of the 2026 Netflix sci-fi drama series The Boroughs.

== "The Passenger (LaLaLa)" ==
"The Passenger (LaLaLa)"

Single by Lumix, D.T.E and Gabry Ponte featuring Mokaby
- Released: January 17, 2020
- Length: 2:39
- Label: Spinnin'
- Songwriters: Iggy Pop; Ricky Gardiner
- Producers: Mokaby; D.T.E; Gabry Ponte; Lum!x

Music video
- "The Passenger (LaLaLa)" on YouTube

Lumix, D.T.E and Gabry Ponte released a cover of the song titled "The Passenger (LaLaLa)" on January 17, 2020, featuring Mokaby. The song charted across Europe.

=== Weekly charts ===
Chart (2020)	Peak position
Austria (Ö3 Austria Top 40)	47
Belgium (Ultratip Bubbling Under Wallonia)	30
France (SNEP)	128
Germany (GfK)	58

=== Certifications ===
Region	Certification	Certified units/sales
Austria (IFPI Austria)	Platinum	30,000^{‡}
Germany (BVMI)	Gold	200,000^{‡}
Poland (ZPAV)	Platinum	20,000^{‡}
^{‡} Sales+streaming figures based on certification alone.

== 2024's re-recorded version by Iggy Pop and Siouxsie Sioux ==
Pop and Siouxsie Sioux collaborated for a new version of "The Passenger": the track appeared in a Magnum advert in April 2024. Pop said: "Siouxsie can sing like a bird. I've always thought she was a great lady. She's been a friend too, she took me to The Nutcracker once, at the Royal Court. Her version of the song was already special, but what happened here, singing together, is really unique. Like 'Volare', the orchestral treatment and marriage of voices flies free, in a spirit of joy. I'm very proud." Sioux added: "I love this song and I've always loved Iggy's voice. Yet even with perfect ingredients, to make something wonderful, you need a touch of magic. In this instance it's what steered the song on its new and unexpected journey. I adore how instinctive and spontaneous it all feels and to hear my voice with Iggy's is such a dream". Consequence of Sound described Pop and Sioux's duet as an "ethereal setting, with a slower tempo and a silky soundscape of harps and strings". Rolling Stone reviewed the 2024 version as a "moody, downtempo ballad that erupts with cinematic and orchestral splendor as Siouxsie and Iggy deliver fittingly dramatic vocal performances." Flood Magazine said it was a "slow-burning epic".
