= Pathfinder (album) =

Studio album by Beggars Opera
- Released: 1972
- Genre: Progressive rock
- Length: 37:53
- Label: Vertigo
- Producer: Beggars Opera

Beggars Opera chronology
Waters of Change (1971)	Pathfinder (1972)	Get Your Dog Off Me! (1973)

Pathfinder is the third album by the Scottish progressive band Beggars Opera, published in 1972.

== Overview ==
This album places less emphasis on the Mellotron, a small stylistic change from the previous albums. Reviews of the album were mixed.

== Track listing ==
No.	Title	Writer(s)	Length
1.	"Hobo"	Alan Park	4:40
2.	"MacArthur Park"	Jimmy Webb	8:20
3.	"The Witch"	Ricky Gardiner, Virginia Scott	5:26
4.	"Pathfinder"	Ricky Gardiner	3:44
5.	"From Shark to Haggis"	Ricky Gardiner, Virginia Scott	6:38
6.	"Stretcher"	Ricky Gardiner	4:50
7.	"Madame Doubtfire"	Alexander McFreddries, Martin Griffiths, Ricky Gardiner	4:15
Total length:			37:53

== Personnel ==
- Ricky Gardiner - lead guitar, vocals
- Martin Griffiths - lead vocals
- Alan Park - keyboards
- Gordon Sellar - bass, acoustic guitar, vocals
- Raymond Wilson - drums

Technical

- Barry Ainsworth, Roger Wake - engineer
- Peter Goodfellow - sleeve illustration
