= Tonight (David Bowie album) =

1984 studio album by David Bowie

Studio album by David Bowie
- Released: 24 September 1984
- Recorded: May–June 1984
- Studios: Le Studio (Morin-Heights, Canada)
- Genres: Pop; blue-eyed soul; dance; rock
- Length: 35:47
- Label: EMI America
- Producers: David Bowie; Derek Bramble; Hugh Padgham

David Bowie chronology
Love You till Tuesday (1984)	Tonight (1984)	Labyrinth (1986)

Singles from Tonight
- 1. "Blue Jean" Released: 10 September 1984; 2. "Tonight" Released: November 1984; 3. "Loving the Alien" Released: May 1985

Tonight is the sixteenth studio album by the English singer-songwriter David Bowie, released on 24 September 1984 through EMI America Records. The follow-up to his most commercially successful album Let's Dance, it was written and recorded in mid-1984 at Le Studio in Morin-Heights, Canada, following the conclusion of the Serious Moonlight Tour. Bowie, Derek Bramble and Hugh Padgham co-produced the album. Many of the same personnel from Let's Dance and the accompanying tour returned for Tonight, with a few additions. Much of Bowie's creative process was the same as he used on Let's Dance, similarly playing no instruments and offering little creative input to the musicians.

The music on Tonight has been characterised as pop, blue-eyed soul, dance and rock. Much of the album's sound is the same as its predecessor's, due to Bowie's effort to retain the new audience that he had recently attracted, although some tracks contain R&B and reggae influences. Devoid of new ideas from touring, Bowie wrote only two new songs himself. Three songs, including the title track, were covers of songs Bowie co-wrote with Iggy Pop, who was present during most of the sessions and co-wrote two tracks. The title track is a duet with singer Tina Turner. The artwork, featuring Bowie blue-painted against an oil painting backdrop, was designed by Mick Haggerty.

Supported by the singles "Blue Jean", "Tonight" and "Loving the Alien", Tonight was a commercial success, reaching number one on the UK Albums Chart. Critical reception was poor, with most finding a lack of creativity. Following the critical dismissal of his next studio album Never Let Me Down (1987), Bowie expressed dissatisfaction with this period, calling Tonight not one of his stronger efforts, a sentiment echoed by later commentators. He did not tour to support the album and only performed "Loving the Alien" and "Blue Jean" on subsequent tours. The album was remastered in 2018 as part of the box set Loving the Alien (1983–1988).

== Background and development ==
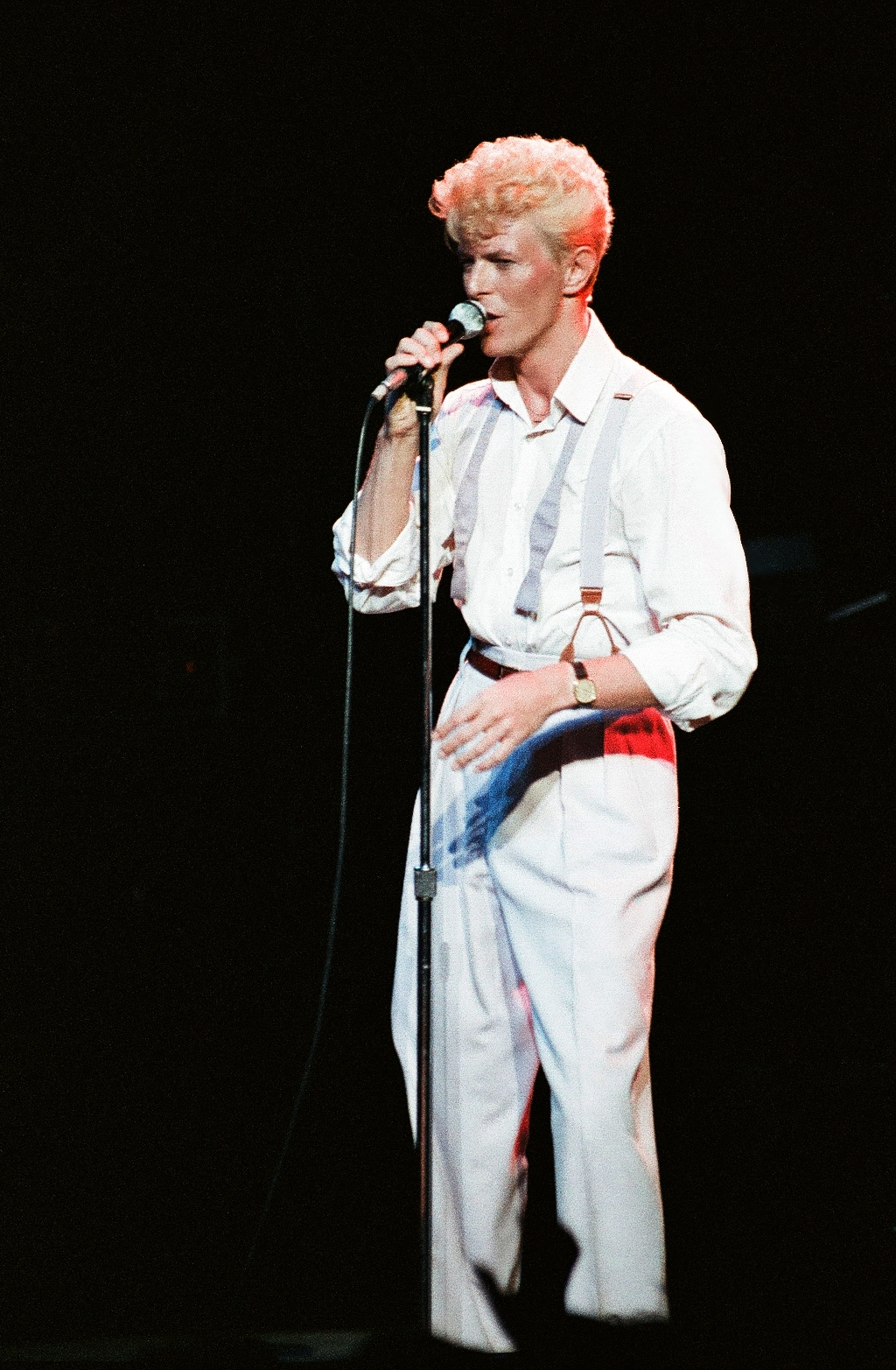
Bowie performing on the Serious Moonlight Tour in 1983

David Bowie released his 15th studio album Let's Dance in April 1983. A major commercial success, it propelled him to worldwide megastardom. He supported the album with the successful Serious Moonlight Tour from May to December 1983. Despite its success, Bowie found himself at a creative stalemate; he realised he no longer knew his audience and later admitted that touring left him devoid of new ideas. At the tour's conclusion, Bowie went on holiday in Bali and Java with his friend, singer Iggy Pop. Pop, having suffered from poor finances for several years, earned royalties from the success of Bowie's recording of "China Girl" and the two were eager to work together on Bowie's next project. Bowie felt he was ill-prepared to record a new album, instead proposing a live album called Serious Moonlight. (Note: Serious Moonlight later saw official release in 2018 as part of the box set Loving the Alien (1983–1988).) Pressure from the label to release a follow-up led Bowie into the studio unprepared.

Bowie said he wanted to "go further" on his next record, aiming to explore R&B, funk and reggae music. Bowie decided not to work with his Let's Dance co-producer Nile Rodgers again, which Rodgers attributed to Bowie wanting to prove he could make hits without a "celebrated hit-maker". Bowie instead chose Derek Bramble, a former bass guitarist for the band Heatwave and more recently a producer for David Grant of the band Linx. As he had done with Rodgers for Let's Dance, Bowie invited Bramble to Mountain Studios in Montreux, Switzerland, to record demos of his new material with a group of local Swiss musicians. According to biographer Chris O'Leary, musicians present at the Tonight sessions said the demos were "tremendous", describing them as "funky, raw, [and] full of promise".

Let's Dance engineer Bob Clearmountain was asked to return but was unavailable; he suggested Hugh Padgham, who had worked with XTC, Genesis, Peter Gabriel, and more recently with the Police as a producer. Padgham initially had mixed feelings about working solely as an engineer but accepted Bowie wanted to work this way. Padgham suggested Le Studio in Morin-Heights, Canada, where he had recently completed work with the Police.

== Writing and recording ==
It was rushed. The process wasn't rushed; we actually took our time recording the thing; Let's Dance was done in three weeks, Tonight took five weeks or something... There wasn't much of my writing on it 'cause I can't write on tour and I hadn't assembled anything to put out. But I thought it a kind of violent effort at a kind of Pin Ups.

— Bowie on the recording process for Tonight

Recording for the new album began at Le Studio in May 1984, less than five months after the Serious Moonlight Tour. Bowie arrived for the sessions with eight of the nine songs that appeared on the album. This surprised collaborator Carlos Alomar, who said "it was the first time in the eleven years that I've been with the damn man that he's brought in anything". Along with Alomar, most of the personnel from Let's Dance and the tour returned for the record, including drummer Omar Hakim, bassist Carmine Rojas, percussionist Sammy Figueroa and backing vocalist George Simms. Newcomers included trumpet player Mark Pender, backing vocalist Curtis King and Guy St Onge on marimba. Biographer Nicholas Pegg argues that St Onge's contributions provide the album with "its most distinctive instrumental identity". The saxophone section—Stanley Harrison, Lenny Pickett and Steve Elson—were dubbed "the Borneo Horns", in line with the tour's brochure. Like Let's Dance, Bowie played no instruments and he delegated almost all responsibility for the music to the musicians, only occasionally offering critical input.

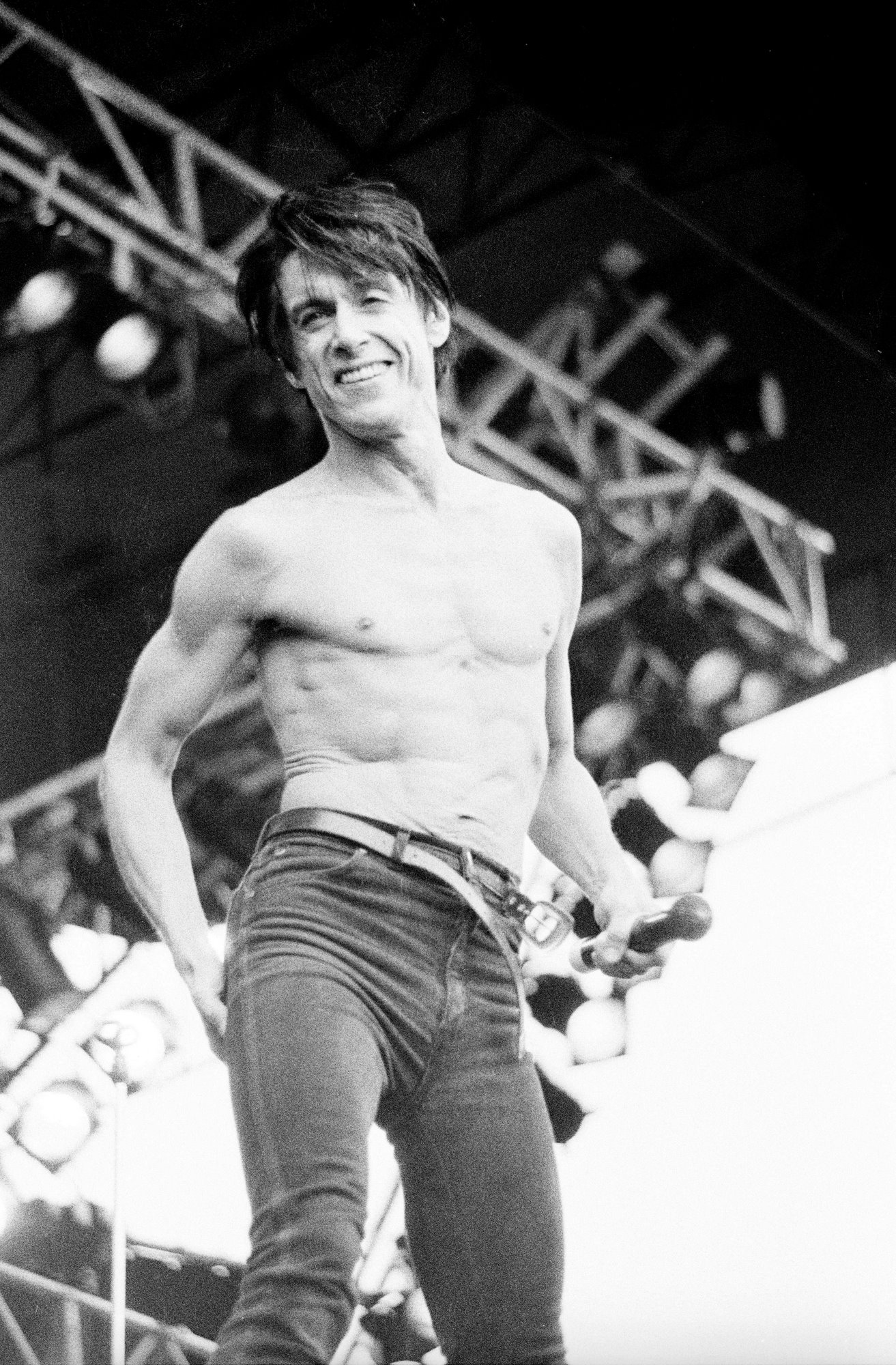
Iggy Pop (pictured in 1987) was present during the sessions and collaborated with Bowie on multiple tracks.

One of the album's major contributors was Iggy Pop, who later said: "There's a lot more work there than is reflected in just the simple co-writing credit for two songs and some of the old stuff." Bowie positively compared the collaboration to The Idiot and Lust for Life, Pop's 1977 albums that Bowie co-wrote and produced. The two's new collaborations resulted in "Tumble and Twirl" and "Dancing with the Big Boys", the latter of which was written and recorded in eight hours as they egged each other on. According to Padgham, the two wrote many songs that did not make the final record, describing these tracks as "more left-field" and "less poppy".

The album features a guest appearance from singer Tina Turner, who sings a duet with Bowie on the title track, "Tonight". During recording, Bowie and Turner sang face-to-face, although Bowie went back and re-recorded the first verse after deciding to sing his part in a higher octave. Turner had just released her massively successful comeback album Private Dancer earlier that year, which featured a cover of Bowie's 1974 song "1984". A year prior, Bowie had secured Turner's re-signing with Capitol Records, leading to her comeback. Twenty years later in 2004, Turner said that Bowie rescued her career when she was dealing with domestic violence.

The sessions were troublesome. Padgham later told biographer David Buckley that Bramble had a habit of asking for "unnecessary retakes", particularly during the vocal takes. Alomar later stated: "Bramble was a really nice guy, but he didn't know jack-shit about producing." However, Bramble himself recalled that even though he's listed as co-producer, it was "really a very communal situation where ideas came from everybody including the teaboy", and that Bowie's and Turner's vocals were nailed rather quickly (usually in one or two passes). Padgham later revealed in the BBC Radio 2 documentary Golden Years that there was a "falling out" with Bramble towards the end of the sessions, leading to his departure and Padgham taking over as producer. Padgham hated many of the songs, specifically the "too poppy" "Blue Jean" and "Tonight", preferring the "more left-field" compositions that were left off the final album. He later expressed regret that he lacked the confidence to finish the other songs, telling Buckley: "Who am I to say to Mr. David Bowie that his songs suck?"

== Songs ==
Commentators have characterised Tonight as pop, blue-eyed soul, dance and rock. Author James E. Perone recognises the presence of reggae, R&B and ska. Bowie purposefully made the album's sound similar to Let's Dance and the Serious Moonlight Tour because he felt the new fans expected to hear the same thing on the new album as the one before. Of the nine songs on the final album, Bowie was the sole writer for only two, "Loving the Alien" and "Blue Jean"; two were co-written by Bowie and Pop, "Tumble and Twirl" and "Dancing with the Big Boys"; and the remaining five are cover versions, three originally by Pop: "Don't Look Down" (from 1979's New Values), "Tonight" and "Neighborhood Threat" (both from 1977's Lust for Life). The other covers are the Beach Boys' 1966 song "God Only Knows", which was reportedly shortlisted for Bowie's 1973 covers album Pin Ups, and the Jerry Leiber and Mike Stoller-penned "I Keep Forgettin'", originally made famous by Chuck Jackson in 1962. Bowie explained: "I think that [Tonight] gave me a chance, like Pin Ups did a few years ago, to do some covers that I always wanted to do."

=== Side one ===
Bowie described "Loving the Alien" as a very personal bit of writing that he did not feel fitted in with the rest of the album because it is such a dark song amidst lighter fare. He said, "'Alien' came about because of my feeling that so much history is wrong – as is being rediscovered all the time – and that we base so much on the wrong knowledge that we've gleaned." Alomar thought the song concerned the Major Tom character from 1969's "Space Oddity", a claim Bowie rejected. The lyrics are religious and politically charged. While Pegg believes it to be a terrific song, he finds it weighed down by "over-elaborate production". Bowie later admitted that the demo was superior. The reworking of "Don't Look Down" is influenced by reggae music. Bowie had attempted it in different ways, including jazz rock, march and ska, eventually settling on reggae. O'Leary found Bowie's version stripped the power of Pop's original. Lyrically, Bowie ponders how short-lived stardom can be.

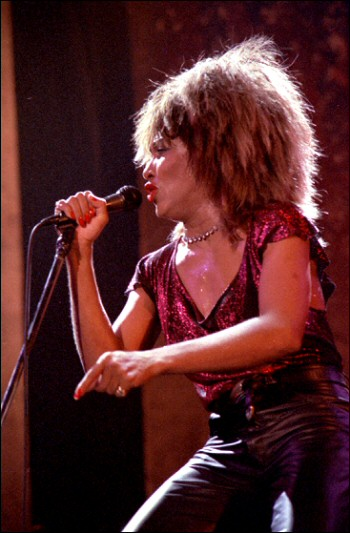
Tina Turner (pictured in 1985) performs guest vocals on the title track.

Bowie's rendition of "God Only Knows" incorporates strings and saxophone, and he sings his vocal in a croon. Although Bowie defended his recording in a contemporary 1984 interview with Charles Shaar Murray, his biographers deride it as "nadir" and one of the worst recordings of his entire career. For "Tonight", Bowie eliminated Pop's original spoken word introduction, believing it an "idiosyncratic thing of [Pop's] that it seemed not part of my vocabulary". His cover, a duet with Tina Turner, is reggae-influenced; her vocals are placed low in the mix. Despite mostly being held in low regard, Kurt Loder of Rolling Stone at the time praised Bowie's version, calling it "one of the most vibrantly beautiful tracks he's ever recorded".

=== Side two ===
"Neighborhood Threat" features a heavier guitar sound than Pop's original, although Pegg says that Bowie's version lacks the original's "doom-laden percussion and wall-of-sound atmospherics". Bowie himself later expressed regret covering the song, calling it "disastrous". "Blue Jean" is generally viewed as the best song on the album. It is an "uptempo throwback" to 1950s and 1960s artists, particularly Eddie Cochran. Later dubbed by Bowie as "sexist rock 'n' roll", Buckley calls it a "fine pop song", albeit "slightly run-of-the-mill by Bowie's standards".

"Tumble and Twirl" recounts Bowie and Pop's exploits while holidaying in Bali and Java at the conclusion of the Serious Moonlight Tour. Bowie felt that lyrically Pop's work stood out the most on the track. Pegg finds its music reminiscent of world music, which Bowie explored on 1979's Lodger. On the cover of "I Keep Forgettin'", Bowie said at the time that he "always wanted to do that song". It is held in low regard by biographers. "Dancing with the Big Boys" is, according to Bowie, about the "little guy" being crushed by "oppressive corporate structures". The lyrics were taken from a backlog of unused lyrics. Containing many studio effects, Pegg says it foreshadows what Bowie explored on 1987's Never Let Me Down. Bowie has said it is the "best example" of what he was trying to accomplish on Tonight:

There's a particular sound I'm after that I haven't really got yet... I think I got quite close to it on "Dancing with the Big Boys". ... I got very musical over the last couple of years – trying to write musically and develop things the way people used to write in the Fifties. I stayed away from experimentation. Now, I think I should be a bit more adventurous. And in "Big Boys", Iggy and I broke away from all that for one track, and it came nearer to the sound I was looking for than anything else.

== Release ==
=== Artwork ===
Mick Haggerty, the artwork designer for Let's Dance (and subsequently Never Let Me Down), did the same for Tonight. It features a blue-painted Bowie with his hair dyed dark brown, against a backdrop of oil-paint coating and flowers. Several commentators have compared it to the works of Gilbert & George. For the design, Bowie asked Haggerty to create "something heroic", pointing to Vladimir Tretchikoff's painting of a blue-skinned Chinese woman for reference. The artwork received mixed reviews. Cap Blackard of Consequence of Sound found the artwork one of Bowie's "most genuinely beautiful" covers. More negatively, Buckley argued that for the first time, one of Bowie's cover artworks was not innovative, rather "satirically run-of-the-mill". Critic Paul Du Noyer later said: "If you look at the album covers and the way he's dressed, it looks like a man who has let himself be designed by others rather than reinventing himself, which is what he has proverbially always done."

=== Singles ===
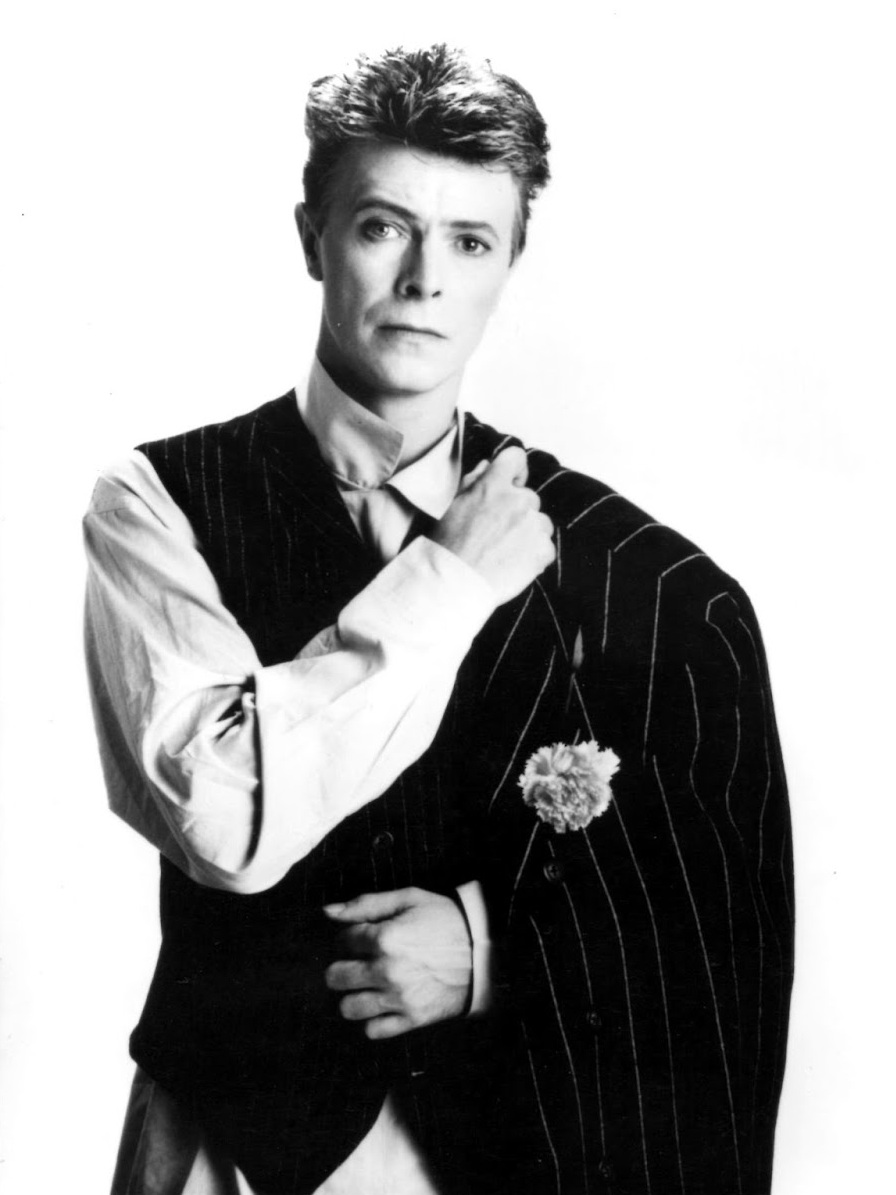
Bowie in a promotional image for the album

"Blue Jean" was released as the lead single on 10 September 1984, backed by "Dancing with the Big Boys". It was a commercial success, peaking at number six in the UK and number eight in the US, mostly promoted with an elaborate 21-minute short film directed by Julien Temple. Partly inspired by the video for Michael Jackson's "Thriller", Jazzin' for Blue Jean was shot in August 1984 and features Bowie in dual roles: as Vic, a man with his eye on a girl and as Screaming' Lord Byron, a flamboyant rock star whose forthcoming gig provides the man with a date. Bowie performs "Blue Jean" as Byron towards the end of the film; a shorter music video for "Blue Jean" was shot a few days later. Bowie and Temple worked together again on the 1986 film Absolute Beginners.

EMI America Records released Tonight on 24 September 1984, nine months after the end of the Serious Moonlight Tour. On 21 November, the album became Bowie's first to be released on the CD format, exclusively in Japan. Coming off the successes of the previous album and tour, and his appearance in the film Merry Christmas, Mr. Lawrence (1983), Tonight continued Bowie's run of commercial successes, peaking at number one on the UK Albums Chart and the Dutch Album Top 100. It also reached number three in Japan, Norway and Spain, four in Australia, Canada, New Zealand and Sweden, seven in Italy, eight in Austria, Switzerland and West Germany, and nine in Finland. It was not as successful in the US as Let's Dance, but peaked at number 11 on the Billboard Top 200 Albums chart.

The title track was released as the second single from the album in November 1984, backed by "Tumble and Twirl". With no supporting video, the single stalled on the charts, peaking at number 53 in both the UK and the US. A remix of "Loving the Alien" was released as the third and final single in May 1985, with a remix of "Don't Look Down" as the B-side. It stalled on the UK charts at number 19. It was promoted by a video co-directed by David Mallet, featuring Bowie performing on the song on an Escher-like set, at one point appearing in blue similar to the album's cover artwork.

After the release of Tonight, EMI commissioned a remix album called Dance that contained seven different 12" mixes from the Let's Dance and Tonight albums in the one release. Dance made it as far as having its cover art completed and a release date (November 1985) and a catalog number (EMI America ST-17175) assigned, before being cancelled. When the box set Loving the Alien (1983–1988) was released in 2018, it included a disc using the original Dance cover art, albeit with different content.

== Critical reception ==
Professional ratings
Initial reviews
Review scores
Source	Rating
Record Mirror	3/5 stars
Rolling Stone	3/5 stars
Smash Hits	5½/10
The Village Voice	C

Upon its release, Tonight was greeted with mostly negative reactions, although it did receive some positive attention. Murray complimented the record's "dizzying variety of mood and technique" in NME, while Billboard said that "the once and future [Bowie] takes yet another turn, saving more edgy, passionate dance-rock for the second side while throwing the spotlight on surprisingly restrained ballads and mid-tempo rockers". Cash Box was also positive, highlighting a number of strong songs and stating that Bowie "loses none of his unique songwriting and vocal adventurousness" with an album that lies in the "same commercial vein" as Let's Dance.

Other reviewers criticised it for lacking creativity. Ian Birch of Smash Hits felt Tonight lacked direction and referred to it as "an uneasy, bumper-to-bumper mixture of styles". In Rolling Stone, Loder said: "This album is a throwaway, and David Bowie knows it." Eleanor Levy of Record Mirror additionally called it disappointing by Bowie's standards: a non-cohesive collection of both good and bad songs. More positively, Jon Pareles of The New York Times enjoyed Bowie's renditions of the Iggy Pop tracks, particularly "Neighborhood Threat" and "Tonight".

== Legacy ==
[Tonight] didn't have any concept behind it, it was just a collection of songs. It sounded sort of jumbled, it didn't hold together well at all...though if you take a song out of context and play it, it sounds pretty good. But if you play it as an album it doesn't work, and that was unfortunate.

— David Bowie reflecting on Tonight in 1987

Almost immediately following its release, Bowie gave few press interviews for Tonight and appeared almost apologetic. In one interview he said, "I guess I wanted to put my musical being in a similar staid and healthy area, but I'm not sure that that was a very wise thing to do." He began a series of miscellaneous projects at the end of 1984 which ventured into 1985, starting with collaborating with the Pat Metheny Group on "This Is Not America", for the soundtrack album of the film The Falcon and the Snowman. He performed at Live Aid, collaborated with Mick Jagger on "Dancing in the Street" and composed songs for the 1986 films Absolute Beginners and Labyrinth, both of which Bowie starred in.

Bowie later distanced himself from his 1984–1987 period following the critical dismissal of Never Let Me Down, and acknowledged Tonight as not one of his stronger efforts. In 1989, he stated that both efforts had "great material that got simmered down to product level", believing the demos were superior compared to the studio recordings. Four years later, he said he was indifferent about what he was doing and he "let everyone tell [him] what to do".

=== Retrospective reviews ===
Professional ratings
Retrospective reviews
Review scores
Source	Rating
AllMusic	2/5 stars
The Encyclopedia of Popular Music	1/5 stars
MusicHound Rock	1/5 stars
Pitchfork	4.3/10
(The New) Rolling Stone Album Guide	1/5 stars
Spin Alternative Record Guide	4/10

Retrospectively, Tonight is generally considered one of Bowie's worst releases. (Note: Attributed to multiple references:) Several critics have described the album as a "mixed bag" with only a few standouts—namely "Loving the Alien" and "Blue Jean", and felt the material was inferior to Let's Dance. Others felt that the record lacked the creative risk that defined Bowie's earlier works. Perone argues that the album stands as an inconsistent collection of individual songs rather than a cohesive album. Amongst negative reviews, author Christopher Sandford called it Bowie's "first serious studio misfire since the days of 'The Laughing Gnome' [1967]"; Buckley and Rob Sheffield both referred to Tonight as a "[near]-artistic" and "career-freezing" disaster, respectively; and O'Leary dismissed it as "an immaculately rancid scrap-bag in which a hit single was stuffed into a pile of covers", standing "among the least-loved [number one] records of its era". In 2024, Rolling Stone ranked Tonight the fourth most disappointing album ever, calling it "turgid" and feeling "oddly rushed".

Nevertheless, many commentators have shown appreciation for Tonight, believing it to be overlooked. The album's defenders include Stylus Magazine's Thomas Inskeep, who argued in 2005 that it is "a much better album than you think it is". He wrote that in a "wildly inconsistent" decade of both good and bad but "never dull" material, Tonight's failures "aren't boring". Another defender was Yo Zushi of the New Statesman, who said in 2016 that "no album that begins with the seven-minute masterpiece 'Loving the Alien' and contains the rocking 'Blue Jean' should have received the drubbing it got". Ben Jardine of Under the Radar magazine contested that "Loving the Alien" foreshadowed the "vocal theatrics" and narrative science fiction elements of 2016's Blackstar, and it and other album tracks sound better decades after its original release. Jardine also said that Tonight, like Bowie's other 1980s records, were integral to his overall discography: "Everything in Bowie's illustrious career was built on what came before it." Pegg finds that despite its flaws, Tonight is a "more interesting and rewarding" record than its predecessor. He considers Bowie's reggae renditions of "Don't Look Down" and the title track "surprisingly successful", and the two Bowie-penned tracks as having strong songwriting, concluding that it was the first Bowie album that was "manifestly behind its time".

=== Reissues ===
In 1995, Virgin Records re-released the album on CD with three bonus tracks, all of them singles from soundtracks Bowie contributed to in the years immediately following the album's release. EMI re-released the album in 1999 (featuring 24-bit digitally remastered sound and no bonus tracks).

In 2018, Tonight was remastered for the Loving the Alien (1983–1988) box set released by Parlophone, with other discs in the set including remixes and B-sides from the album. The album was released in CD and vinyl formats, as part of this compilation and then separately the following year.

== Track listing ==
Side one
No.	Title	Writer(s)	Originally by	Length
1.	"Loving the Alien"	David Bowie		7:11
2.	"Don't Look Down"	Iggy Pop; James Williamson	Iggy Pop, from New Values, 1979	4:11
3.	"God Only Knows"	Brian Wilson; Tony Asher	The Beach Boys, from Pet Sounds, 1966	3:08
4.	"Tonight" (with Tina Turner)	Bowie; Pop	Iggy Pop, from Lust for Life, 1977	3:46

Side two
No.	Title	Writer(s)	Originally by	Length
1.	"Neighborhood Threat"	Bowie; Pop; Ricky Gardiner	Iggy Pop, from Lust for Life, 1977	3:12
2.	"Blue Jean"	Bowie		3:11
3.	"Tumble and Twirl"	Bowie; Pop		5:00
4.	"I Keep Forgettin'"	Jerry Leiber; Mike Stoller; Gil Garfield	Chuck Jackson, from Any Day Now, 1962	2:34
5.	"Dancing with the Big Boys" (with Iggy Pop)	Bowie; Pop; Carlos Alomar		3:34
Total length:				35:47

== Personnel ==
Adapted from the Tonight liner notes and the International Musician magazine.

- David Bowie – vocals
- Derek Bramble – guitar (solo on "I Keep Forgettin'"); guitar synthesiser; bass guitar ("Loving the Alien"); Yamaha DX7, Oberheim OB-8, Roland Jupiter-8 and PPG Wave 2.2 synthesizers; backing vocals
- Carlos Alomar – guitars
- Omar Hakim – drums
- Carmine Rojas – bass guitar
- Mark King – bass guitar ("Tumble and Twirl") (uncredited)
- Rob Yale – Fairlight CMI ("Loving the Alien", "Tonight", "God Only Knows") (uncredited)
- Guy St. Onge – marimba
- Sammy Figueroa – percussion
- Tina Turner – lead vocals ("Tonight")
- Iggy Pop – backing vocals ("Dancing with the Big Boys")
- Robin Clark – backing vocals
- George Simms – backing vocals
- Curtis King – backing vocals
- Arif Mardin – string arrangements; synthesisers
- Mark Pender – flugel horn; trumpet

The Borneo Horns

- Stanley Harrison – alto saxophone; tenor saxophone
- Lenny Pickett – tenor saxophone; clarinet
- Steve Elson – baritone saxophone

Production

- David Bowie – producer
- Derek Bramble – producer
- Hugh Padgham – producer, engineer and mixer

== Charts and certifications ==
=== Weekly charts ===
1984 weekly chart performance for Tonight
Chart (1984)	Peak Position
Australian Albums (Kent Music Report)	4
Austrian Albums (Ö3 Austria)	8
Canadian Albums (RPM)	4
Dutch Albums (Album Top 100)	1
Finnish Albums (Suomen virallinen lista)	9
Italian Albums (Musica e dischi)	7
Japanese Albums (Oricon)	3
New Zealand Albums (RMNZ)	4
Norwegian Albums (VG-lista)	3
Spanish Albums (PROMUSICAE)	3
Swedish Albums (Sverigetopplistan)	4
Swiss Albums (Schweizer Hitparade)	8
UK Albums (Official Charts)	1
US Billboard Top 200 Albums	11
West German Albums (GfK Entertainment)	8

2019 weekly chart performance for Tonight
Chart (2019)	Peak Position
Hungarian Albums (MAHASZ)	10

=== Year-end charts ===
1984 year-end chart performance for Tonight
Chart (1984)	Position
Australian Albums (Kent Music Report)	58
Canadian Albums (RPM Year-End)	29
UK Albums (OCC)	44

=== Certifications and sales ===
Certifications and sales for Tonight
Region	Certification	Certified units/sales
Canada (Music Canada)	2× Platinum	200,000^{^}
France (SNEP)	Gold	
Japan (Oricon Charts)	—	153,000
New Zealand (RMNZ)	Gold	7,500^{^}
Spain (Promusicae)	Gold	50,000^{^}
United Kingdom (BPI)	Gold	100,000^{^}
United States (RIAA)	Platinum	1,000,000^{^}
Summaries
Worldwide	—	3,600,000
^{^} Shipments figures based on certification alone.
