= Act One (album) =

Studio album by Beggars Opera
- Released: 1970
- Recorded: De Lane Lea Studios, Holborn, London
- Genre: Progressive rock
- Length: 41:57
- Label: Vertigo
- Producers: Bill Martin, Phil Coulter

Beggars Opera chronology
Act One (1970)	Waters of Change (1971)

Act One is the debut album of the Scottish progressive band Beggars Opera.

== Overview ==
Variously classified as symphonic rock, progressive rock or proto-progressive rock, Beggars Opera's debut album has been compared to (and sometimes described as "derivative of") works by The Nice and Deep Purple MK I. It was published by Vertigo (which had at the time introduced its legendary "swirl" label) in 1970 and features cover art by the renowned surrealist photographer and artist Marcus Keef (the same that created the covers for Black Sabbath's first three albums). In the same year the band also released a somewhat successful single, "Sarabande", which was not included in the album in its original LP edition, but appears in the CD reissue.

The album includes many elements of symphonic progressive rock, including a number of references to classical music (e.g.,Poet and Peasant and Light Cavalry by Franz von Suppé and Grieg's Peer Gynt), an Emerson-esque keyboard section featuring organ and Hammond, complex arrangements, and long suites (most notably "Raymond's Road").

== Track listing ==
No.	Title	Writer(s)	Length
1.	"Poet and Peasant"	Franz von Suppé; arranged by Beggars Opera	7:10
2.	"Passacaglia"	George Frideric Handel (passacaglia-Suite in g-minor, HWV432), Marshall Erskine, Virginia Scott; arranged by Alan Park	7:04
3.	"Memory"	Marshall Erskine, Virginia Scott; arranged by Alan Park	3:57
4.	"Raymond's Road"	Alan Park, Ricky Gardiner, Marshall Erskine, Martin Griffiths, Raymond Wilson; arranged by Alan Park	11:49
5.	"Light Cavalry"	Franz von Suppé; arranged by Beggars Opera	11:57

== Personnel ==
Beggars Opera

- Martin Griffiths - vocals
- Alan Park - organ
- Raymond Wilson - drums
- Ricky Gardiner - lead guitar
- Marshall Erskine - bass guitar
