= Waters of Change =

Studio album by Beggars Opera
- Released: 1971
- Recorded: Command Studios and De Lane Lea Studios, London
- Genre: Progressive rock
- Length: 42:03
- Label: Vertigo
- Producers: Bill Martin, Phil Coulter

Beggars Opera chronology
| Act One (1970) | Waters of Change (1971) | Pathfinder (1972) |

Waters of Change is the second album by the Scottish progressive band Beggars Opera, released in 1971.

== Overview ==
With respect to its predecessor Act One, Waters of Change features a rather different sound, which is less derivative of The Nice and Deep Purple MK I, and it is often described as the band's best work.

== Track listing ==
| No. | Title | Writer(s) | Length |
|---|---|---|---|
| 1. | "Time Machine" | Park, Griffiths, Gardiner | 8:00 |
| 2. | "Lament" | Park, Wilson | 1:51 |
| 3. | "I've No Idea" | Park, Griffiths | 7:42 |
| 4. | "Nimbus" | Sellar, Griffiths, Gardiner | 3:43 |
| 5. | "Festival" | Park, Griffiths, Erskine | 6:00 |
| 6. | "Silver Peacock" (Intro) | Griffiths, Scott | 0:22 |
| 7. | "Silver Peacock" | Park, Griffiths, Scott | 6:33 |
| 8. | "Impromptu" | Gardiner, Scott | 1:14 |
| 9. | "The Fox" | Gardiner, Griffiths, Scott | 6:52 |

== Personnel ==
Beggars Opera

- Ricky Gardiner - lead guitar, vocals, acoustic guitar
- Martin Griffiths - lead vocal, cow bell
- Alan Park - organ, piano
- Gordon Sellar - bass and acoustic guitar, vocals
- Virginia Scott - Mellotron, vocals
- Raymond Wilson - drums, percussion

with:

- Marshall Erskine - bass, flute on "Festival"
- Barry Ainsworth, Martin Birch - engineers
