= Through the Looking Glass (Siouxsie and the Banshees album) =

1987 studio album by Siouxsie and the Banshees

Studio album by Siouxsie and the Banshees
- Released: 2 March 1987
- Recorded: August–September 1986
- Studios: Abbey Road (studio 2), London
- Genres: Alternative rock; art rock
- Length: 43:54
- Labels: Polydor; Geffen (US)
- Producers: Siouxsie and the Banshees; Mike Hedges

Siouxsie and the Banshees chronology
Tinderbox (1986)	Through the Looking Glass (1987)	Peepshow (1988)

2024 re-release vinyl cover
- The vinyl reissue in 2024.

Singles from Through the Looking Glass
- 1. "This Wheel's on Fire" Released: 5 January 1987; 2. "The Passenger" Released: 16 March 1987

Through the Looking Glass is the eighth studio album by the English rock band Siouxsie and the Banshees. The album is a collection of cover versions. It was co-produced with Mike Hedges and released in March 1987 on Polydor. Through the Looking Glass included two singles: "This Wheel's on Fire" and "The Passenger". It was the second and final album recorded with guitarist John Valentine Carruthers. Some of their cover songs were praised by the original artists.

In October 2024 the album was reissued on crystal-clear vinyl with new artwork featuring a mirror-effect sleeve with a circular die-cut centre section both front and back. A limited edition with an extra fold-out poster was also released.

== History ==
The title of the record, Through the Looking Glass, referred to Lewis Carroll's book of the same name. The band had already been inspired by Carroll's work when naming their label, Wonderland, which was derived from Alice's Adventures in Wonderland. The record was also an ode to David Bowie's Pin Ups, a covers album recorded in the early 1970s. After spending more than a year working on 1986's Tinderbox, the Banshees wanted spontaneity, and quickly returned to the studio after the tour, to record their own covers album. It was a project they had been considering since recording a version of the Beatles's "Dear Prudence" in 1983.

For the Through the Looking Glass sessions, which took place in August and September 1986, they chose material mainly dating from the first half of the 1970s, from an era preceding the 1976 formation of their band. Most of the songs were from artists who had influenced them: Roxy Music, John Cale, Iggy Pop, the Doors and Kraftwerk. Producer Mike Hedges, who hadn't worked with them since 1984, was called back. The instrumentation was different; for this album, they hired other instrumentalists including a brass section and a harpist. Musician Martin McCarrick, who would become an official member of the Banshees after this album, created string arrangements for several tracks.

The band's version of Iggy Pop song "The Passenger" featured brass arrangements played by Pete Thoms and Luke Tunney, who had already worked with Siouxsie and Budgie on the Creatures' single "Right Now".

== Release ==
Through the Looking Glass was released on 2 March 1987 on Polydor. A few weeks after, Bowie contacted them to be the special guests at two shows on his Glass Spider Tour in Anaheim.

The album was reissued on CD with bonus tracks in October 2014. A 180g vinyl reissue of the album, remastered from the original ¼” tapes and cut half-speed at Abbey Road Studios by Miles Showell, was released in August 2018.

In October 2024 the album was reissued on crystal clear vinyl with new artwork featuring a mirror board sleeve, for National Album Day.

== Reception and legacy ==
Professional ratings
Review scores
Source	Rating
AllMusic	3/5 stars

Ralf Hütter of Kraftwerk lauded the version of "Hall of Mirrors" and stated: "In general, we consider cover versions as an appreciation of our work. The version of 'Hall of Mirrors' by Siouxsie and the Banshees is extraordinary". Iggy Pop said of their cover of "The Passenger": "That's good. She sings it well and she threw a little note in when she sings it, that I wish I had thought of. It kind of improves it ... The horn thing is good". Jeff Buckley biographer Stan Cuesta, who interviewed the singer, wrote that Buckley discovered "Strange Fruit" via the Banshees' version which made him want to cover it at his turn.

In their contemporary review, the Los Angeles Times stated: "These songs are superbly rearranged, retaining enough of what was special about the originals and adding just the right new twists." Critic Terry Atkinson wrote about their cover of "Strange Fruit": "Only someone as brash as Siouxsie Sioux would re-record Lewis Allan's "Strange Fruit," a song so strongly identified with Billie Holiday. And only someone as serious and sensitive could bring it off like this. A solemn string section behind the vocals and—best of all—a bridge of New Orleans funeral-march jazz enhance Siouxsie's evocative interpretation". Atkinson then concluded emphasising, "Such inventive touches permeate a great album". Sounds praised the rendition of "Trust in Me" as "quite astonishing. Whereas once it was about a python getting ready to crush a little boy to death, now it's a harp-laden lullaby of rampant, swirling eroticism".

In a retrospective review, AllMusic said: "The inspired range of covers reaches from glam-era landmarks (Roxy Music's 'Sea Breezes', John Cale's 'Gun') to Billie Holiday's sorrowful touchstone 'Strange Fruit' to, in one of the best such efforts ever (and a year before Hal Willner's Stay Awake project), a Disney classic—namely the slinky 'Trust in Me', originally from The Jungle Book and given a spare, mostly-Budgie backing that could almost be a sparkling Creatures outtake".

Mojo included their version of "Strange Fruit" on the 2007 CD Music Is Love: 15 Tracks That Changed the World Recovered By.... Writing in the 2004 edition of The Rolling Stone Album Guide, Mark Coleman and Mac Randall gave Through the Looking Glass a rating of 2.5 stars out of five, saying that it contains "overpolished covers of the group's obvious influences". In an article about "Records Turning 30 Years Old in 2017", Paste included it in their top fifteen saying that it was, "an eclectic and adventurous album of Siouxsie-fied takes on a diverse collection of songs", with "interesting and engaging choices". Journalist Will Hodge concluded: "this album is a prime example of the value of artistic merit not being accurately measured by mainstream successes".

== Track listing ==
Side one
No.	Title	Writer(s)	Original artist	Length
1.	"This Town Ain't Big Enough for Both of Us"	Ron Mael	Sparks	3:09
2.	"Hall of Mirrors"	Ralf Hütter, Florian Schneider, Emil Schult	Kraftwerk	5:03
3.	"Trust in Me"	Sherman Brothers	Kaa (voice by Sterling Holloway) in The Jungle Book	4:06
4.	"This Wheel's on Fire"	Bob Dylan, Rick Danko	Bob Dylan & The Band	5:17
5.	"Strange Fruit"	Lewis Allan	Billie Holiday	3:53

Side two
No.	Title	Writer(s)	Original artist	Length
6.	"You're Lost Little Girl"	John Densmore, Robbie Krieger, Ray Manzarek, Jim Morrison	The Doors	2:57
7.	"The Passenger"	Iggy Pop, Ricky Gardiner	Iggy Pop	5:10
8.	"Gun"	John Cale	John Cale	5:06
9.	"Sea Breezes"	Bryan Ferry	Roxy Music	4:15
10.	"Little Johnny Jewel"	Tom Verlaine	Television	4:56

2014 CD remastered reissue bonus tracks
No.	Title	Writer(s)	Original artist	Length
11.	"She Cracked"	Jonathan Richman	The Modern Lovers	3:07
12.	"Song from the Edge of the World" (Single Version)	Siouxsie and the Banshees		3:45
13.	"This Wheel's on Fire" (Incendiary Mix)			7:27
14.	"The Passenger" (Locomotion Mix)			8:05

== Personnel ==
Siouxsie and the Banshees

- Siouxsie Sioux – vocals
- Steven Severin – electric bass and keyboards
- Budgie – drums and percussion
- John Valentine Carruthers – guitars and keyboards

Additional personnel

- Martin McCarrick – cello, keyboards, string arrangements
- Jocelyn Pook – viola
- Gini Ball – violin
- Pete Thoms – trombone
- Luke Tunney – trumpet
- Martin Dobson – saxophone
- Julie Aliss – harp
- Mike Hedges – producer, engineer
- Ian Grimble – engineer
- Gareth Cousins – assistant engineer

== Charts ==
Chart performance for Through the Looking Glass
Chart (1987)	Peak position
Dutch Albums (Album Top 100)	62
European Albums (Music & Media)	28
German Albums (Offizielle Top 100)	59
New Zealand Albums (RMNZ)	46
Swedish Albums (Sverigetopplistan)	23
Swiss Albums (Schweizer Hitparade)	29
UK Albums (Official Charts)	15
US Billboard 200	188

== Certifications ==
Certifications for Through the Looking Glass
Region	Certification	Certified units/sales
United Kingdom (BPI)	Silver	60,000^{^}
^{^} Shipments figures based on certification alone.
