= Lust for Life (Iggy Pop song) =

- Cover of the 1977 Netherlands single

Single by Iggy Pop

from the album Lust for Life
- B-side: "Success"
- Released: October 1977
- Recorded: June 1977
- Studio: Hansa (West Berlin)
- Genre: Garage rock; jangle pop; rock and roll
- Length: 5:12
- Label: RCA
- Songwriters: Iggy Pop; David Bowie
- Producer: David Bowie

Music video
- "Lust for Life" on YouTube

"Lust for Life" is a 1977 song performed by American singer Iggy Pop and co-written by David Bowie, featured on the album of the same name. In 2004, Rolling Stone ranked it at No. 149 on their list of "The 500 Greatest Songs of All Time", re-ranking it at No. 325 in their 2021 updated list.

Upon release, this song was only a hit in the Netherlands and Belgium, but its usage in the opening scene of the 1996 film Trainspotting led to renewed international popularity.

== Composition and performance ==
Co-written by Iggy Pop and David Bowie (written on a ukulele), the song is known for its opening drumbeat (played by Hunt Sales). The rhythm was based on the Armed Forces Network call signal, which Pop and Bowie picked up on while waiting for a broadcast of Starsky & Hutch. The drumbeat has since been imitated in numerous songs, including "Are You Gonna Be My Girl" by Jet and "Selfish Jean" by Travis; however, Sales's use of the rhythm was not original, as it was itself derived from "You Can't Hurry Love", released in July 1966 by the Supremes, and "I'm Ready for Love", released in October 1966 by Martha and the Vandellas; both songs were penned by Motown's Holland–Dozier–Holland songwriting team.

In October 1977, the song was released as a single in the Netherlands and Belgium, reaching No. 3 on the Dutch Top 40. Its success was credited to a performance in the Dutch pop TV show TopPop, where Iggy Pop, shirtless, wrecked part of the stage set (which consisted of a couple of potted plants and some cardboard scenery). Although many viewers and newspapers complained about the apparent damage, the director of TopPop later admitted that they knew beforehand what Iggy was going to do and that the damage was minimal.

== Trainspotting ==
"Lust for Life" gained renewed popularity in the late 1990s after being featured in the 1996 British film Trainspotting. The song was heavily featured in the film's marketing campaign and subsequent soundtrack album, resulting in a new UK chart peak of No. 26 on the singles chart after being reissued as a single on November 11, 1996.

It also reached No. 39 on the US Radio & Records Alternative chart, No. 44 in Canada, and No. 2 in Iceland. The single's success inspired Pop's then-label Virgin Records to issue a greatest hits compilation titled Nude & Rude. Pop's biographer Joe Ambrose wrote that the song gained the same level of resurgence as the Doors' "The End" after that song's inclusion in Francis Ford Coppola's 1979 film Apocalypse Now. In 1999, Pop reflected on the song's renewed popularity:

When I made Lust for Life, I really thought America was gonna rock to this motherfucker. And it took 20 fuckin' years which is a really long time to wait. I guess what happened is that there was this system that wasn't gonna fuckin' give me a break, and I outlived the system. The movies and advertisers have subverted the stranglehold of radio in America, and there are now other ways for people to hear music. All of a sudden, – a few years ago when Trainspotting came out – I was walkin' down the street and I'd heard Raw Power comin' out of the bars.

A remix by the Prodigy was included in Trainspotting's 2017 sequel, T2 Trainspotting.

Singer Kay Hanley recorded a cover version of the song for the soundtrack of the 2005 movie Just Like Heaven.

== Lyrics ==
The song's lyrics contain a number of references to William S. Burroughs' experimental novel The Ticket That Exploded, most notably mentions of "Johnny Yen" (described by Burroughs as "The Boy-Girl Other Half strip tease God of sexual frustration") and "hypnotizing chickens".

In a 1995 interview, Doors keyboardist Ray Manzarek and manager Danny Sugerman stated that the opening lyrics were about their deceased heroin dealer, nicknamed "Gypsy Johnny", arriving at Wonderland Avenue, with his heroin and his "motorized dildos".

== Track listing ==
1977 Netherlands single

1. "Lust for Life" – 5:11
2. "Success" – 4:23

1996 UK single

1. "Lust for Life" – 5:11
2. "(Get Up I Feel Like A) Sex Machine" – 4:05
3. "Lust for Life (Live at the Feile Festival, 1993)" – 5:35
4. "I Wanna Be Your Dog (Live at the Rock for Choice Benefit concert)" – 4:55

== Personnel ==
According to biographer Chris O'Leary:

- Iggy Pop – lead vocals
- David Bowie – piano
- Ricky Gardiner – lead guitar
- Tony Sales – bass, backing vocals
- Carlos Alomar – rhythm guitar
- Hunt Sales – drums, tambourine, shaker, backing vocals

== Charts ==
=== Weekly charts ===
1977–1978 weekly chart performance for "Lust for Life"
Chart (1977–1978)	Peak position
Belgium (Ultratop 50 Flanders)	6
Belgium (Ultratop 50 Wallonia)	28
Netherlands (Dutch Top 40)	3
Netherlands (Single Top 100)	4

1996 weekly chart performance for "Lust for Life"
Chart (1996)	Peak position
Australia (ARIA)	194
Canada Top Singles (RPM)	44
Iceland (Íslenski Listinn Topp 40)	2
Europe (Eurochart Hot 100)	90
Scottish Singles Sales (Official Charts)	22
UK Singles (Official Charts)	26

=== Year-end charts ===
1977 year-end chart performance for "Lust for Life"
Chart (1977)	Position
Netherlands (Dutch Top 40)	44
Netherlands (Single Top 100)	50

1978 year-end chart performance for "Lust for Life"
Chart (1978)	Position
Belgium (Ultratop 50 Flanders)	80
Netherlands (Single Top 100)	63

1996 year-end chart performance for "Lust for Life"
Chart (1996)	Position
Iceland (Íslenski Listinn Topp 40)	54

== Certifications ==
Certifications for "Lust for Life"
Region	Certification	Certified units/sales
United Kingdom (BPI)	Gold	400,000^{‡}
^{‡} Sales+streaming figures based on certification alone.
