= Lust for Life (Iggy Pop album) =

1977 studio album by Iggy Pop

Studio album by Iggy Pop
- Released: September 9, 1977
- Recorded: May–June 1977
- Studio: Hansa (West Berlin)
- Genres: Punk rock; hard rock; proto-punk; garage rock
- Length: 41:53
- Label: RCA Victor
- Producers: David Bowie; Iggy Pop; Colin Thurston

Iggy Pop chronology
The Idiot (1977)	Lust for Life (1977)	Kill City (1977)

Singles from Lust for Life
- 1. "Success" / "The Passenger" Released: September 30, 1977; 2. "Lust for Life" / "Success" Released: October 1977

Lust for Life is the second solo studio album by the American musician Iggy Pop, released on September 9, 1977, through RCA Records. It was his second collaboration with David Bowie after The Idiot, released in March the same year. Shortly after Bowie released his own album Low in January, Pop went on a tour to support The Idiot with Bowie as his keyboardist. At the tour's conclusion, Pop and Bowie regrouped in Berlin to record Pop's next solo album.

Lust for Life was recorded at Hansa Studio by the Wall in West Berlin from May to June 1977, with production being handled by Bowie, Pop, and the engineer Colin Thurston. The touring band of Pop, Bowie, the guitarist Ricky Gardiner, and brothers Tony Fox and Hunt Sales on bass and drums, respectively, comprised the primary lineup for the album. After The Idiot was mostly composed by Bowie, Pop was adamant about having more control over Lust for Life, often composing his own arrangements, including for "Sixteen". This resulted in a hard rock and proto-punk sound more akin to his older style with the band the Stooges. Pop used Bowie's arrangements for some songs, including the well-known title track.

Upon release, Lust for Life received little promotion from RCA but nevertheless peaked at number 28 on the UK Albums Chart and remained Pop's highest-charting album there until 2016's Post Pop Depression. It also peaked at number 8 in the Netherlands and number 120 on the US Billboard Top LPs & Tape chart. Critically, Lust for Life was well-received, with many praising Pop's energetic performance throughout and his greater role compared to The Idiot; Lust for Life later became regarded as one of his best works and has appeared on several best album lists. It was Pop and Bowie's final collaboration until the mid-1980s.

== Background ==
After a period of drug addiction, Iggy Pop joined his friend David Bowie on his 1976 Isolar Tour and afterwards, moved to Europe with him in hopes of getting sober. After moving into the Château d'Hérouville in Hérouville, France, Bowie decided to produce Pop's first solo album. Recorded from June to August 1976, The Idiot was Pop's first release since the breakup of his former band the Stooges in 1974. The majority of the music was composed by Bowie, while Pop wrote most of the lyrics, often in response to the music being composed. Due to Bowie's major influence on its creation, The Idiot marked a departure from the proto-punk sound of the Stooges, in favor of a style more akin to art rock. After the album's completion, Bowie recorded his own album, Low, in a style reminiscent of The Idiot. Bowie's label RCA Records released Low in January 1977 and due to its unexpected commercial success, Bowie persuaded RCA to release The Idiot in March. The album became the biggest commercial success involving Pop up to that point, reaching the top 40 in the UK charts and the top 75 in the US charts.

Bowie declined to promote Low, opting instead to support Pop on a tour of his own. With himself on keyboards, Bowie assembled a band that included Ricky Gardiner on guitar, with brothers Tony Fox and Hunt Sales on bass and drums, respectively. Rehearsals began in mid-February 1977, and the tour began at the start of March. Songs played included popular Stooges numbers, a couple of tracks from The Idiot, and tracks that appeared on Lust for Life, including "Tonight", "Some Weird Sin", and "Turn Blue". Bowie was adamant about not taking the spotlight away from Pop, often staying behind his keyboard and not addressing the audience. The tour ended on April 16. The success of The Idiot and the tour earned Pop fame and success greater than he ever achieved with the Stooges. However, during interviews, he was often asked about Bowie more than his own work. This frustrated Pop, and he realized that for their next collaboration, he had to take more control.

== Recording ==
David and I had determined that we would record [Lust for Life] very quickly, which we wrote, recorded, and mixed in eight days, and because we had done it so quickly, we had a lot of money left over from the advance, which we split."

— Iggy Pop on the recording process for Lust for Life

At the end of the tour, Pop and Bowie returned to Berlin to start writing. To further achieve his own identity, Pop moved out of the apartment he was sharing with Bowie and his assistant Coco Schwab, relocating to his own place in the same building. The two continued writing for a few weeks before Gardiner joined them in May 1977, who recalled that "quite a few ideas were already present". The trio spent a small number of weeks writing, devising tracks such as "The Passenger" and "Lust for Life". At the end of May, they moved to the Hansa Studio by the Wall to begin recording. The rhythm section of Hunt and Tony Sales on drums and bass, respectively, returned from the tour, along with guitarist Carlos Alomar, who was brought in by Bowie as a musical director. Bowie reduced his role significantly from The Idiot, solely contributing keyboards like the tour. Gardiner recalled that because they were already a "tour-hardened band", there was a more "live" feel to the tracks than The Idiot. For the impromptu "Fall in Love with Me", the band swapped instruments: Hunt played bass, Tony Fox played guitar, and Gardiner played drums.

Bowie, Pop, and producer-engineer Colin Thurston produced Lust for Life under the pseudonym "Bewlay Bros.", named after the final track on Bowie's 1971 album Hunky Dory. Pop did not sleep much during its making, commenting "See, Bowie's a hell of a fast guy ... I realized I had to be quicker than him, otherwise whose album was it gonna be?" He worked frequently with the Sales brothers and Gardiner, even rejecting some musical arrangements Bowie provided him for a few tracks, including "Success". Pop prepared only fragments of lyrics before singing, and essentially improvised at the microphone. This spontaneous lyrical method inspired Bowie to improvise his own words on his next studio album "Heroes" (1977). According to Pop, the entire album was written, recorded, and mixed in eight days, starting in May and finishing in June.

== Music and themes ==
Lust for Life is generally considered to be more of a pop record than the Bowie-dominated The Idiot, being less experimental and having more of a rock and roll flavor. Overall, reviewers have characterized Lust for Life as punk rock, hard rock, proto-punk and garage rock. Some of its themes are similarly dark, as in "The Passenger", cited by NME editors Roy Carr and Charles Shaar Murray as one of Pop's "most haunting" tracks, and "Tonight" and "Turn Blue", both of which deal with heroin abuse. In contrast were more upbeat songs such as "Success" and "Lust for Life", the latter of which was described by Rolling Stone as Pop's "survivor message to the masses".

According to Pop, Bowie's celebrated riff on "Lust for Life" was inspired by the Morse code opening to the American Forces Network news in Berlin. At various points in the song, the melody is doubled by the entire band; in Alomar's words, "You can't play a counter-rhythm to that, you just had to follow." Joy Division drummer Stephen Morris declared, "On Lust for Life the drums sound not huge but massive! The loudest cymbals known to man, that riff! I wanted to sound like that, still do."

"The Passenger" was inspired by a Jim Morrison poem that saw "modern life as a journey by car", as well as rides on the Berlin S-Bahn, according to Pop's former girlfriend Esther Friedmann. The lyrics have also been interpreted as "Iggy's knowing commentary on Bowie's cultural vampirism". The music, a "laid-back ... springy groove", was composed by Gardiner. Characterized by AllMusic as "a glorious throwaway" and by Rolling Stone as "an infectious throwaway", "Success" is a light-hearted track of the call and response variety.

At just under seven minutes, "Turn Blue", the longest song on Lust for Life, was a sprawling confessional that dated back to an abortive recording session by Bowie and Pop in May 1975, when the latter was in the depths of his drug addiction. Originally titled "Moving On", it was composed by Bowie, Pop, Walter Lacey, and Warren Peace. It was the only set of lyrics that did not appear on the original vinyl record sleeve. The album's remaining tracks included "Sixteen", the only piece written entirely by Pop; "Some Weird Sin", a hard rock number featuring a "lost-boy lyric"; the "neo-punk" "Neighborhood Threat"; and "Fall in Love with Me", which grew from an impromptu jam by the band to which Pop composed lyrics apparently evoking Friedmann.

== Artwork and release ==
The cover photo was by Andy Kent, who also shot the cover for The Idiot. It was shot in Pop's dressing room while he prepared to talk to an interviewer during his UK tour. Kent stated: "It was a lucky great shot. This was [Pop]. The nice guy, a guy you'd like to hang out with." Nicholas Pegg writes that the cover provides a stark contrast to The Idiot, in that Pop's healthy appearance and smiling gaze represent Lust for Life's overall positive tone compared to its predecessor.

Lust for Life was released through RCA on September 9, 1977, (Note: Chris O'Leary and AllMusic give the release date as August 29, 1977, while Paul Trynka and Joe Ambrose give a date of September 7, 1977.) with the catalog number RCA PL-12488. It received little promotion from RCA, primarily due to the death of Elvis Presley two weeks earlier, whose catalog the label was adamant on reissuing. Although RCA had pressed decent quantities of the album, once the first pressings were sold out, there were none left. Tony Sales recalled: "Lust for Life just disappeared from the shelves, and that was it." Paul Trynka notes that whereas The Idiot had received a decent amount of press coverage, Lust for Life, which he calls "the most overtly commercial album of Iggy Pop's career"—and the record that marked his "return to health and happiness"—received little, contributing to its poor performance.

Despite little promotion and lack of vinyl pressings, Lust for Life managed to peak at number 28 on the UK Albums Chart and remained Pop's highest-charting release in the UK until 2016's Post Pop Depression. It also peaked at number 120 on the US Billboard Top LPs & Tape chart, and performed well in the Netherlands, peaking at number 8. "Success", backed with "The Passenger", was released on September 30, 1977, as a single from the album, but failed to chart.

=== Tour ===
With little promotion from the label, Pop continued touring. The Sales brothers were brought back for the tour, while the Canadian guitarist Stacy Heydon, who worked with Bowie on his 1976 Isolar Tour, replaced Gardiner on guitar. Bowie, promoting "Heroes", was replaced on keyboards by former Stooges member Scott Thurston. The band performed 40 gigs in almost nine weeks and received positive reviews. The critic Lester Bangs of NME, who gave negative assessments for both The Idiot and Lust for Life, praised Pop's on-stage energy. Thurston recalled Pop being more professional than his days touring with the Stooges; he attributed this to him turning 30 years old. Thurston and Pop became good friends during the tour, although Pop still suffered from bouts of alcohol and cocaine use, as well as financial troubles. Pop fired the Sales brothers at the end of the tour.

== Critical reception ==
Professional ratings
Review scores
Source	Rating
AllMusic	5/5 stars
Blender	4/5 stars
Chicago Tribune	3.5/4 stars
Christgau's Record Guide	A−
The Encyclopedia of Popular Music	5/5 stars
Pitchfork	9.0/10
Q	5/5 stars
The Rolling Stone Album Guide	4/5 stars
Sounds	5/5 stars
Spin Alternative Record Guide	6/10

On release, Lust for Life was met with positive reviews from music critics. In a contemporary review, Rolling Stone critic Billy Altman considered that "purely on its own terms, Lust for Life is a successful album", but complained that Pop's "new stance is so utterly unchallenging and cautious". By contrast, Robert Christgau of The Village Voice refuted the critical opinion that Pop's "creative power has dissipated", finding The Idiot and Lust for Life to be more consistent than Pop's albums with the Stooges. He later noted that of the two, he preferred Lust for Life "because it's faster and more assertive—which means, among other things, that the nihilistic satire is counteracted by the forward motion of the music itself".

Kris Needs of ZigZag felt Lust for Life is not as "consistent" as its predecessor. He nevertheless considered the album one of his favorite albums of 1977, finding it to be more of a "day" record with its predecessor being a "night" record. In Sounds, Pete Makowski praised the record, calling it "excellent". He complimented the band's performance and Pop's vocals, labeling them "a bit jagged but powerful". Writing for NME, Max Bell gave the record a positive review, calling it "quite good". He praised Pop's greater role compared to The Idiot, as well as his vocal performance. However, he was critical of some tracks, including "Some Weird Sin", "Tonight", and "Success", the last of which he considered "'Fame' revisited". Lust for Life was ranked the eighth best album of the year by NME in their end-of-year list.

Retrospectively, Lust for Life has continued to receive positive reviews. Writing for AllMusic, Mark Deming called Lust for Life Pop's best solo work, stating that with the record, he "managed to channel the aggressive power of his work with the Stooges with the intelligence and perception of The Idiot, and the result was the best of both worlds". Trynka calls Lust for Life Pop's "most effervescent, optimistic album", praising Pop's greater contribution to the record over its predecessor. Reviewing the album as part of the 2020 box set The Bowie Years, Sasha Geffen of Pitchfork praised Pop's performance, writing that he managed to put more of himself into the record than The Idiot.

== Aftermath and legacy ==
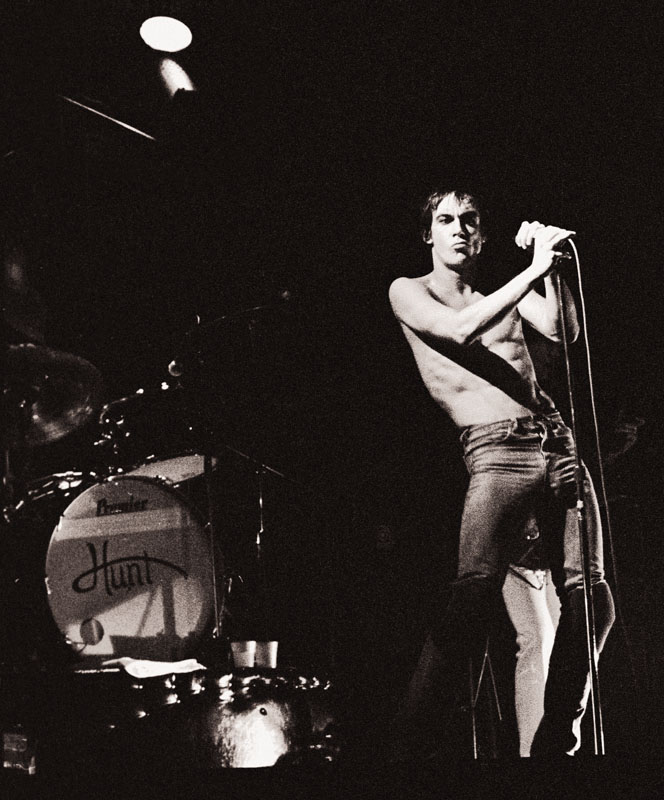
Pop on stage during the Lust for Life tour in late 1977.

At the end of the tour, Pop became fed up with RCA and decided he was going to quickly finish his contract with a live album. The album, assembled from soundboard tapes from the two prior tours and given quick touch-ups by Edu Meyer at Hansa, was released as TV Eye Live in May 1978. It earned him a decent payout from RCA. Prior to its release, recordings Pop had made with former Stooges member James Williamson in 1975 were released in November 1977 through Bomp! Records as Kill City, credited jointly to Pop and Williamson. After leaving RCA, Pop signed with Arista Records; his first album for them, New Values, was produced by Williamson and released in the fall of 1979.

Although Bowie had told interviewers that he planned to do a third collaboration with Pop in 1978, Lust for Life was the two's last official collaboration until the mid-1980s. Pop co-wrote tracks with Bowie for the latter's 1984 album Tonight, while Bowie co-wrote and co-produced Pop's 1986 album Blah-Blah-Blah. For Tonight, Bowie covered three of Pop's tracks, including two off Lust for Life: "Neighborhood Threat" and "Tonight", which he dueted with singer Tina Turner and removed the opening drug-related lines, and "Don't Look Down" from New Values. Siouxsie and the Banshees recorded a cover of "The Passenger" with brass instruments on their 1987 album Through the Looking Glass. Pop praised it, commenting: "She threw a little note in when she sings it that I wish I had thought of, it's kind of improved it [...] The horn thing is good." Bowie reconnected with the Sales brothers in 1989 when they formed their hard rock band Tin Machine.

The title track gained renewed popularity in the late 1990s after being featured in the 1996 British comedy film Trainspotting. The song was heavily featured in the film's marketing campaign and subsequent soundtrack album, resulting in a new UK chart peak of number 26 after being reissued as a single. The single's success inspired Pop's then-label Virgin Records to issue a greatest hits compilation titled Nude & Rude. Joe Ambrose writes that it gained the same level of resurgence as the Doors' "The End" (1967) after the latter's inclusion in Francis Ford Coppola's 1979 film Apocalypse Now. In 1999, Pop reflected on the song's renewed popularity:

When I made Lust for Life, I really thought America was gonna rock to this motherfucker. And it took 20 fuckin' years which is a really long time to wait. I guess what happened is that there was this system that wasn't gonna fuckin' give me a break, and I outlived the system. The movies and advertisers have subverted the stranglehold of radio in America, and there are now other ways for people to hear music. All of a sudden, – a few years ago when Trainspotting came out – I was walkin' down the street and I'd heard Raw Power comin' out of the bars.

Lust for Life has appeared on several best-of lists by multiple publications. Sounds and Mojo ranked the album 21st and 44th in their lists of the 100 greatest albums of all time in 1986 and 1995, respectively. Pitchfork ranked Lust for Life number 64 in its list of the 100 Best Albums of the 1970s in 2004. In 2013, NME ranked the album 217th in their list of the 500 Greatest Albums of All Time. It was also included in the 2018 edition of Robert Dimery's book 1001 Albums You Must Hear Before You Die.

=== 2020 deluxe edition ===
On April 10, 2020, Pop released an alternate mix of "China Girl" from The Idiot in promotion of then-upcoming album The Bowie Years, a seven-disc deluxe box set featuring expanded remastered versions of The Idiot and Lust for Life. The box set, released on May 29, includes remastered versions of both albums along with outtakes, alternate mixes, and a 40-page book. The two original albums were also re-released individually, each paired with an additional album of live material to create separate stand-alone two-disc deluxe editions.

== Track listing ==
All lyrics are written by Iggy Pop, except "Turn Blue" by Pop and Walter Lacey; composers are listed below.

Side one
No.	Title	Music	Length
1.	"Lust for Life"	David Bowie	5:13
2.	"Sixteen"	Pop	2:26
3.	"Some Weird Sin"	Bowie	3:42
4.	"The Passenger"	Ricky Gardiner	4:44
5.	"Tonight"	Bowie	3:39

Side two
No.	Title	Music	Length
1.	"Success"	Bowie, Gardiner	4:25
2.	"Turn Blue"	Bowie, Warren Peace	6:56
3.	"Neighborhood Threat"	Bowie, Gardiner	3:25
4.	"Fall in Love with Me"	Bowie, Hunt Sales, Tony Sales	6:30
Total length:			41:53

== Personnel ==
According to the liner notes and the author Thomas Jerome Seabrook:

- Iggy Pop – vocals
- David Bowie – keyboards, piano, organ, backing vocals
- Carlos Alomar – rhythm guitar, backing vocals, lead guitar ("Lust for Life", "Turn Blue")
- Ricky Gardiner – lead guitar, backing vocals, drums ("Fall in Love with Me")
- Warren Peace – keyboards and backing vocals ("Turn Blue")
- Tony Fox Sales – bass, backing vocals, guitar ("Fall in Love with Me")
- Hunt Sales – drums, backing vocals, bass ("Fall in Love with Me")

Technical

- Iggy Pop – producer (as Bewlay Bros.)
- David Bowie – producer (as Bewlay Bros.)
- Colin Thurston – producer (as Bewlay Bros.), engineer, mastering engineer (UK)
- Eduard Meyer – engineer
- Ian Cooper – mastering engineer (UK)
- Greg Calbi – mastering engineer (US)
- Richard Robinson – mastering engineer (US)
- Andrew Kent – cover photography

== Charts and certifications ==
Weekly chart performance for Lust for Life
Chart (1977)	Peak position
Dutch Albums (Album Top 100)	8
UK Albums (Official Charts)	28
US Billboard Top LPs & Tape	120

Chart (2026)	Peak position
Greek Albums (IFPI)	57

Sales and certifications for Lust for Life
Region	Certification	Certified units/sales
United Kingdom (BPI)	Gold	100,000^{*}
^{*} Sales figures based on certification alone.
