= Never Let Me Down =

1987 studio album by David Bowie

Studio album by David Bowie
- Released: 21 April 1987
- Recorded: September–November 1986
- Studios: Mountain (Montreux, Switzerland); Power Station (New York City)
- Genres: Pop rock; art rock; hard rock
- Length: 53:07 (CD); 48:06 (LP)
- Label: EMI America
- Producers: David Bowie; David Richards

David Bowie chronology
Labyrinth (1986)	Never Let Me Down (1987)	Tin Machine (1989)

Singles from Never Let Me Down
- 1. "Day-In Day-Out" Released: 23 March 1987; 2. "Time Will Crawl" Released: 15 June 1987; 3. "Never Let Me Down" Released: 17 August 1987

Never Let Me Down is the seventeenth studio album by the English musician David Bowie, released on 21 April 1987 through EMI America Records. Co-produced by Bowie and David Richards and featuring the guitarist Peter Frampton, the album was recorded in Switzerland and New York City from September to November 1986. Bowie's goal for the project was to record it differently following his disappointment with 1984's Tonight. Musically, Never Let Me Down has been characterised as pop rock, art rock and hard rock; Bowie himself considered the record a return to rock and roll music. The cover artwork features Bowie surrounded by numerous elements from the songs.

Never Let Me Down was commercially successful, reaching the UK top 10; its three singles all reached the UK top 40. Despite this, the album was poorly received by fans and was met with negative reviews from critics, with most criticising the "overblown" production. Bowie supported it on the Glass Spider Tour, a world tour that was at that point the biggest, most theatrical and elaborate tour of his career. The tour, like the album, was commercially successful but critically panned. The critical failure of the album and tour were factors that led Bowie to look for a new way to motivate himself creatively, leading him to create the rock band Tin Machine in 1989; he did not release another solo album until Black Tie White Noise in 1993.

In later decades, Never Let Me Down is generally regarded as one of Bowie's weakest releases. The track "Too Dizzy" has been deleted from subsequent reissues due to Bowie's dislike of it. Throughout his lifetime, Bowie was critical of Never Let Me Down, distancing himself from the arrangement and production of the finished album. He expressed a desire to remake it numerous times, eventually remixing "Time Will Crawl" for the career retrospective iSelect in 2008.

== Background and development ==
David Bowie's rise in fame and success from Let's Dance and the Serious Moonlight Tour in 1983 made him feel disconnected from his newfound fanbase. After the poor reception of 1984's Tonight, he worked on a series of miscellaneous projects that included collaborations with the Pat Metheny Group for "This Is Not America" (from the soundtrack to the film The Falcon and the Snowman) and Mick Jagger for "Dancing in the Street". He also continued acting and composing for film soundtracks such as Absolute Beginners (1985) and Labyrinth (1986).

Wanting another record, EMI compiled a compilation of 12″ mixes from Let's Dance and Tonight following Bowie's successful performance at Live Aid in 1985. Titled Dance, it reached the artwork stage before being shelved. (Note: A version of Dance with a modified tracklist, including remixes from Labyrinth and Never Let Me Down, later saw official release in 2018 as part of the box set Loving the Alien (1983–1988).) In mid-1986, Bowie produced and co-wrote multiple tracks with his old friend Iggy Pop for his solo album Blah-Blah-Blah, recorded five songs for the soundtrack for Labyrinth, and recorded the title song of the 1986 film When the Wind Blows with the Turkish musician Erdal Kızılçay, before commencing work on his next studio record.

== Writing and recording ==
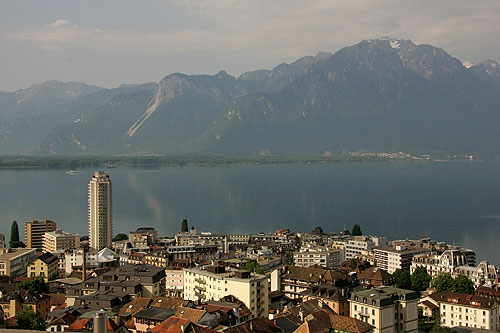
A view of Montreux, Switzerland, where Bowie recorded the album

Bowie spent mid-1986 in his home in Switzerland writing songs with Iggy Pop. He bought a Fostex 16-track and AHB mixing console to record elaborate home demos, which he recorded with Kızılçay before regrouping with a full band. Having worked together sporadically since 1982, Bowie greatly appreciated Kızılçay's musicianship, proclaiming, "He can switch from violin to trumpet to French horn, vibes, percussion, whatever ... His knowledge of rock music begins and ends with the Beatles! His background is really jazz." During the sessions, Kızılçay played keyboards and synthesisers and, according to the biographer Chris O'Leary, "provided any sound" Bowie requested. Unlike the sessions for Tonight, Bowie encouraged collaboration for the new album's sessions, mainly wanting "better" versions of his home demos.

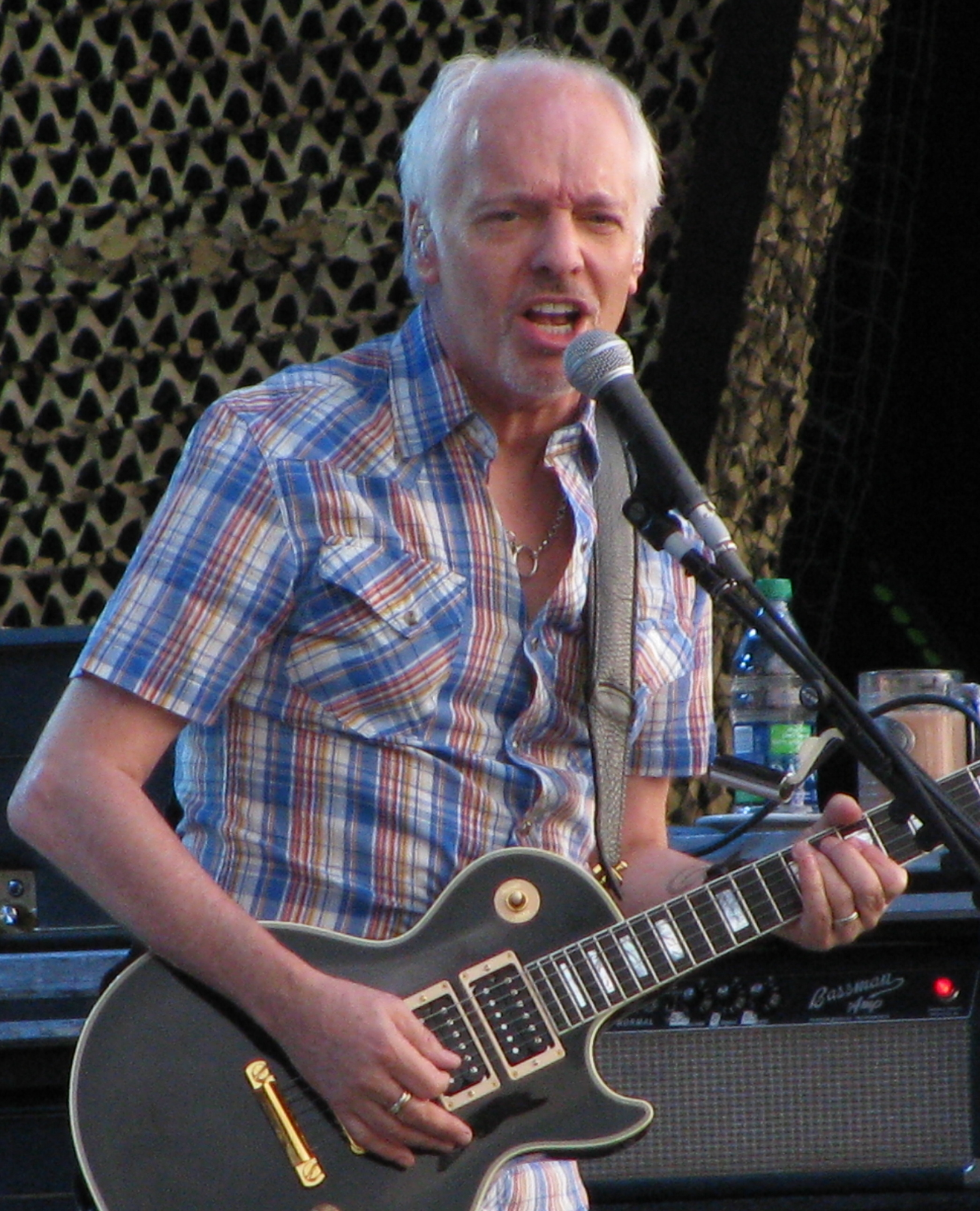
Peter Frampton (pictured in 2011) contributed guitar to the album and joined Bowie on the supporting tour.

Never Let Me Down was recorded between September and November 1986, beginning at Mountain Studios in Montreux, Switzerland, and completing at the Power Station in New York City. It was co-produced by Bowie and David Richards; both had co-produced Blah-Blah-Blah and the latter previously engineered "Heroes" (1977). Let's Dance engineer Bob Clearmountain returned for Never Let Me Down. According to Bowie, he was responsible for the album's "great, forceful sound". Returning from the Tonight sessions was regular collaborator Carlos Alomar on guitar, Carmine Rojas on bass and a group of saxophonists known as the Borneo Horns. With Kızılçay, they were joined on lead guitar by Bowie's former classmate Peter Frampton, whom Bowie hired after listening to his latest record Premonition (1986). He stated at the time, "I always thought it'd be good to work with him 'cause I was so impressed with him as a guitarist at school." Frampton played on all but three tracks; lead guitar duties for "Day-In Day-Out", "Time Will Crawl" and a cover of Iggy Pop's "Bang Bang" were done by Sid McGinnis, a some-time member of David Letterman's band. For the first time since 1980's Scary Monsters (and Super Creeps), Bowie played instruments in addition to singing, contributing keyboards, synthesiser and rhythm guitar on some tracks, and played lead guitar on "New York's in Love" and "'87 and Cry". The band worked from 10 a.m. to 8 p.m.. Kızılçay recalled Bowie being "very disciplined" during the sessions and "always" trying new things.

Bowie, Richards and Kızılçay recorded backing tracks at Mountain for the first two weeks, after which Alomar and Frampton were flown in for guitar overdubs. Sessions then moved to the Power Station, where horns and backing vocalists were added, with additional percussion from Errol "Crusher" Bennett. According to Richards, these were elements that Bowie said "you can only get in New York". Regarding Bennett's contributions, Richards recalled: "[He] set all his 'bangers' and 'scrapers' on a table, which I miked at each end. So whenever he moved around, the sounds would pan with him, creating some strange spatial effects." The majority of Bowie's vocals were taken from guide vocals recorded at Mountain, although some were later redone at the Power Station. Richards explained that most of [the guide] vocals were so good and had such great spontaneity that they ended up on the record." "Never Let Me Down" was a last-minute addition to the album, written and recorded in one day during the last week of mixing at the Power Station. Actor Mickey Rourke also performed the mid-song rap for "Shining Star (Makin' My Love)". The two had met in London where the actor was based while filming A Prayer for the Dying (1987) and requested to contribute. Two tracks were recorded that ended up as B-sides, "Julie" and "Girls", the latter of which was briefly considered for inclusion on Never Let Me Down in late 1986.

== Songs ==
I wanted the energy, high power and state-of-the-art sound of the '80s, but I also wanted to reflect everything I've lived through and been a fan of and been involved in.

— David Bowie on the album's sound, 1987

The music on Never Let Me Down has been characterised as pop rock, art rock and hard rock. At the time, Bowie said the musical styles reflected the different styles he wrote with over the preceding years, and further stated the sound and style was reminiscent of Scary Monsters and less like its immediate predecessors, calling it "an eclectic hybrid of long-standing influences and personal nostalgia." At the time, a writer for the Canadian Press considered the record "a basic serving of high-energy, guitar rock", representing a departure from his "adventurous" late 1970s works and the "R&B-flavoured" Let's Dance. The biographer Paul Trynka says the record contains mostly "conventional music, lyrics and sounds".

=== Side one ===
The opening track, "Day-In Day-Out", offers the artist's commentary on the treatment of the homeless in Los Angeles. The author James E. Perone states that the song is a good example of Bowie's experimentation with the R&B genre. "Time Will Crawl" was inspired by the Chernobyl disaster and the idea that someone from one's own neighborhood could be responsible for the end of the world. Compared to Prince's "1999", Bowie said his vocals on the song were indebted to Neil Young, and noted that the variety of voices he used on the album were a nod to the musicians who had influenced him in the past. Bowie called "Beat of Your Drum" a Lolita song, a "reflection on young girls... 'Christ, she's only 14 years old, but jail's worth it!'" The biographer Nicholas Pegg, who called the song one of the album's better tracks, noted that it could be called a "direct ancestor", both lyrically and musically, to Tin Machine's "You Belong in Rock n' Roll" (1991). Perone finds it resembles the contemporary techno craze, while further exhibiting punk rock influences.

The title track is about Bowie's long-time personal assistant, Coco Schwab. The song's direct reference to her acts as a counterpoint to the rest of the songs, which the artist felt were mostly allegorical. Bowie attributed his vocal performance to John Lennon. One reviewer later called it one of Bowie's "most underrated songs". "Zeroes", which Rolling Stone's Steve Pond called the most heartening and successful track on the album, is a nostalgia trip. Bowie explained: "I wanted to put in every 60s cliche I could think of! 'Stopping and preaching and letting love in,' all those things. I hope there's a humorous undertone to it. But the subtext is definitely that the trappings of rock are not what they're made out to be." Musically, the track features a sitar reminiscent of George Harrison's work with the Beatles and references Bowie's earlier songs "Diamond Dogs" (1974) and "'Heroes'" (1977) in its music and title, respectively.

=== Side two ===
"Glass Spider" marks a return to the electronica of Bowie's late 1970s Berlin Trilogy, as well as influences of psychedelic folk and heavy metal. It presents a mythological story based on a documentary Bowie had seen about black widow spiders, describing how they lay the skeletons of their prey out on their webs. Echoing the Diamond Dogs track "Future Legend" (1974), he thought that the Glass Spider's web would make a good enclosure for a concert tour, thus giving the supporting tour its name and stage dressing.

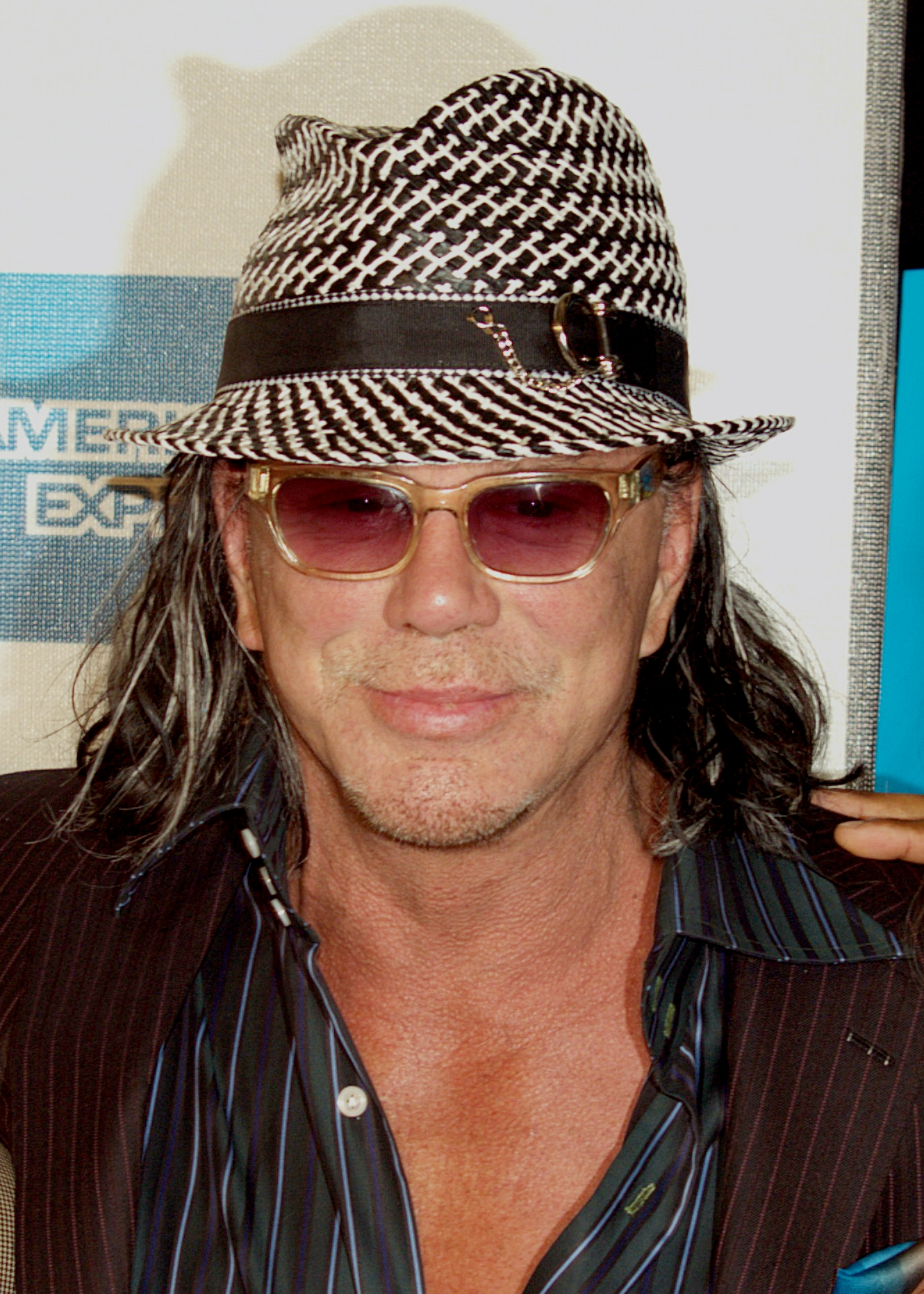
The actor Mickey Rourke (pictured in 2009) performed the mid-song rap on "Shining Star (Makin' My Love)".

Bowie described "Shining Star (Makin' My Love)" as one that "reflects back-to-street situations, and how people are trying to get together in the face of so many disasters and catastrophes, socially around them, never knowing if they're going to survive it themselves. The one thing they have got to cling on to is each other; although it might resolve into something terrible, it's the only thing that they've got. It's just a little love song coming out of that environment." He rejected the notion that his "high, little" voice (which he attributed to Smokey Robinson) in the song was a new character, instead saying it was just what the song needed, as he had tried the song in his regular voice and did not like the outcome: "That never bothered me, changing voices to suit a song. You can fool about with it." "New York's in Love" is a dance track that Bowie described as a sarcastic song about the vanity of big cities. Pegg later called it "a strong contender for the ... wooden spoon" of the album.

"'87 & Cry" was written as a statement about "Thatcherite" England, referring to the distinction between the authoritarian government and the citizens. Bowie acknowledged that the lyrics verged on the surreal, describing people "eating the energies of others to get to what they wanted." "Too Dizzy" was the first song Bowie and Kızılçay wrote together for the album and was written in homage to the 1950s. The former said, "a real Fifties subject matter was either love or jealousy, so I thought I'd stick with jealousy because it's a lot more interesting". Bowie covered Iggy Pop's "Bang Bang", which originally flopped as a single, for Never Let Me Down as he felt it could be a hit. For his version, Bowie imitated Pop in his vocal performance, while lyrically, it contains themes present in other album tracks. Perone compares Bowie's version to the work of Talking Heads' David Byrne.

== Release ==
It's a pompous little title, isn't it? Seen out of context it's quite abrasive, but in the context of the song and songs on the album, I think it's rather tongue-in-cheek to use it as the title. Also, there's a vaudevillian thing about the cover. The two combined are kind of comical.

— David Bowie on the album's title and cover

EMI America Records released "Day-In Day-Out" as the lead single to the album on 23 March 1987, with "Julie" as the B-side. The single performed decently in both the UK and the US, peaking at Nos. 17 and 21, respectively. The song's music video, directed by Julien Temple, contained controversial content and was banned by some networks. A version of the song sung in Spanish, recorded to promote Bowie's first-ever concerts in Spain during the Glass Spider Tour, was released for the first time in 2007 when the "Day-In Day-Out" EP was released digitally.

Never Let Me Down followed a month later on 21 April 1987. It was the first Bowie record to feature simultaneous releases on vinyl and CD. Both of these formats had different lengths in the runtime, with four tracks on the CD release up to a minute longer. In Australia, the album appeared on blue vinyl and in Japan, a Japanese vocal version of the outtake "Girls" was included. The cover artwork was designed by Mike Haggerty, who designed the artworks for Let's Dance and Tonight, and taken by photographer Greg Gorman. It was described by Bowie as being in a "vaudevillian" style. It depicts the long-haired Bowie jumping through a circus ring surrounded by elements from the album's songs, including a drum, a skyscraper, a "candyfloss" cloud, and an angel from the "Day-In Day-Out" music video.

Initial sales of the album were strong, peaking at No. 6 on the UK Albums Chart, but dropped off disappointingly. Bowie was not concerned with the album's relative poor performance in the charts, saying "I've made about 20 albums during my career, and so far this is my third biggest seller. So I can't be that disappointed, yet, it is a letdown that it hasn't been as buoyant as it should be. ... But I don’t really feel that negative about it. As far as I'm concerned, it's one of the better albums I've made. As I've said, Never Let Down has been a pretty big seller for me. So I'm quite happy." "Time Will Crawl" was released as the second single from the album on 15 June 1987, backed by "Girls". It stalled on the UK Singles Chart, peaking at No. 33. Bowie pre-recorded a performance of the song for the BBC television programme Top of the Pops, although it was not aired at the time, as the single subsequently fell down the charts. Its accompanying music video was directed by Tim Pope and previewed some of the choreography of the then-underway tour.

The title track was released as the album's third single on 17 August 1987, with "'87 and Cry" as the B-side. It peaked at No. 34 in the UK and No. 27 in the US. Its accompanying music video was directed by Jean-Baptiste Mondino and was described by Bowie as "experimental". "Shining Star" was one of Bowie's early choices to be a single, but the idea was rejected by EMI. A 12″ remix of the song was made available on iTunes when the "Never Let Me Down" EP was released digitally in 2007. EMI briefly considered "Too Dizzy" for release as a fourth single, instead appearing as a promo release in the US.

== Critical reception ==
Professional ratings
Initial reviews
Review scores
Source	Rating
Record Mirror	2.5/5 stars
Smash Hits	4/10
The Village Voice	C+

Contemporary reviews of the album were mostly unfavorable. In Trouser Press, Ira Robbins wrote, "although this casual loud-rock outing... seems on first blush to be slapdash and slight, the first side is actually quite good, offering provocative pop-culture lyrics delivered with first-take enthusiasm and carefree backing." The Canadian Press's Tim O'Connor praised Never Let Me Down as an improvement over the "unfocused disaster" Tonight, finding the musical styles "suit[s] him well" and concluded: "It's not so dazzling or powerful an album that it will set any styles, but it's good to hear Bowie kicking out the jams again." In Billboard, Steve Gett hailed the record as "unquestionably" Bowie's finest work up to that point, highlighting "Day-In Day-Out", "Time Will Crawl", the title track and "Shining Star", another reviewer called it "a welcome return to form for the ever-ambitious Bowie", and the magazine's year-retrospective issue called it "arguably the year's most underrated release" and considered the album a "Critic's Choice" for the year.

Negative reviews found the production "overblown" and complained about an overuse of synthesisers and weak songwriting. Chris William of the Los Angeles Times primarily criticised the lack of innovation, finding elements from Bowie's entire career. He further stated that none of the tracks are among Bowie's best—calling "Day-In Day-Out" "the most useless single of Bowie's career"—and ultimately expected more from the artist. In Smash Hits, Tom Hibbert deemed the album dull and full of "contrived studio jams", giving sole praise to "Bang Bang". Glenn O'Brien of Spin called the album "an inspired and brilliantly crafted work. It's charged with a positive spirit that makes art soul food; imbued with the contagious energy that gives ideas a leg to dance on". Rolling Stone's Steve Pond called the work an "odd, freewheeling pastiche of elements from all the previous Bowies", "unfocused", and possibly "the noisiest, sloppiest Bowie album ever. ... Being noisy and sloppy isn't necessarily a bad thing, but sad to say, Never Let Me Down is also something of a mess." In his review for The New York Times, Jon Pareles also recognised elements of Bowie's previous works in Never Let Me Down and felt it was Bowie's "most serious statement" since Scary Monsters. In Creem, Roy Tarkin felt that the album represented a creative low point for Bowie due to poor execution. Tarkin ended his review stating "I guess you could say Never Let Me Down did just that; let me down." USA Today considered Never Let Me Down to be the second worst pop album of 1987, writing that Bowie "loses himself in a self-conscious Tom Jones disguise."

== Tour ==
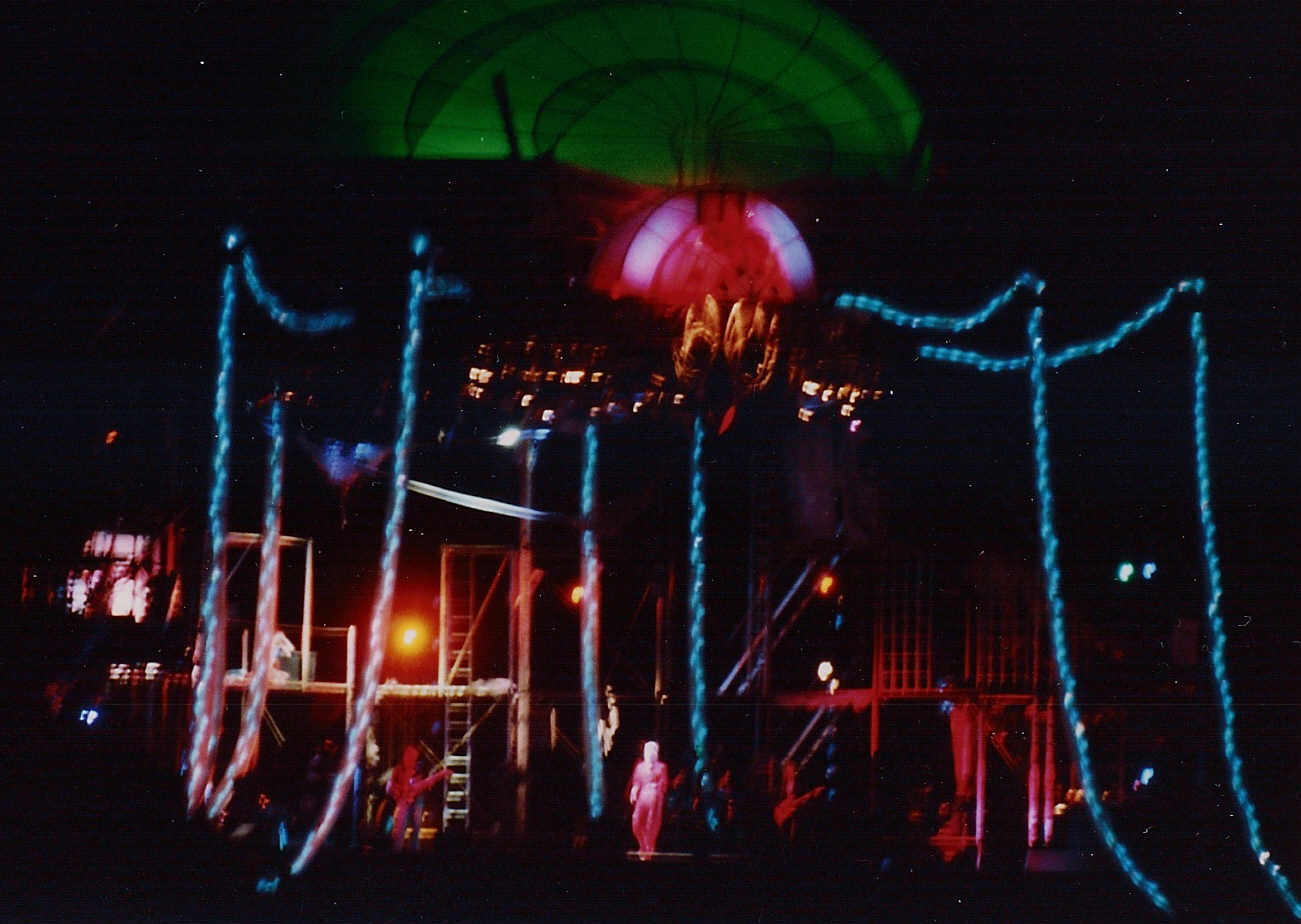
Bowie (bottom center) on stage in Nürburg in support of Never Let Me Down

To support the album, Bowie embarked on the Glass Spider Tour, which began on 30 May 1987 and ended on 28 November the same year. Earlier in the year Bowie said: "I'm going to do a stage thing this year, which I'm incredibly excited about, 'cause I'm gonna take a chance again", but when pressed for details, he refused to give up any, saying "I'll just be doing what I always did, which is keeping things interesting."

Bowie performed several of the album's songs during a press tour that preceded his highly theatrical Glass Spider Tour, which played to a combined audience of as many as six million fans. Bowie wanted to produce a live show that picked up where his aborted 1974 Diamond Dogs Tour left off. Although considered financially successful and well attended, the tour itself was critically dismissed. Bowie designed his next few tours specifically to avoid the problems that the Glass Spider Tour was criticised for by avoiding overly theatrical stage presentations and focusing on his music. However, no song from Never Let Me Down was performed on any of Bowie's tours after 1987.

== Subsequent events ==
At the conclusion of the Glass Spider Tour, Bowie began to reevaluate where he was at in his career. The tour took a toll on him and he found it hard to maintain the stadium rockstar lifestyle. Due to the negative critical reception of the album and tour, he decided to rejuvenate himself creatively and artistically, forming the rock band Tin Machine with guitarist Reeves Gabrels, whom he met through the tour, creating a partnership that lasted the rest of the 1990s. Bowie also effectively cut ties with Alomar, a collaborator since 1975's Young Americans, although the guitarist later played on the 1995 Outside Tour and on a few tracks for Outside (1995), Heathen (2002) and Reality (2003).

Now I listen to Never Let Me Down and I wish I had [been less indifferent to its production], because there were some good songs on it, but I let go and it became very soft musically; which wasn't the way I would have done it if I had been more involved.

— David Bowie, 1993

Although he was initially proud of the finished product, Bowie's views on Never Let Me Down soured as the years passed. By 1993, he remarked that he played the role of a session musician in the studio and allowed others to take control of the production and arrangements rather than being more involved himself, resulting in a final product he felt was "a bitter disappointment". When his personal website BowieNet launched in 1998, Never Let Me Down was the artist's only studio album excluded from his official career biography on the site. Three years prior, he acknowledged Never Let Me Down as his "nadir":

It was such an awful album. I've gotten to a place now where I'm not very judgmental about myself. I put out what I do, whether it's in visual arts or in music because I know that everything I do is really heartfelt. Even if it's a failure artistically, it doesn't bother me in the same way that Never Let Me Down bothers me. I really shouldn't have even bothered going into the studio to record it. [laughs] In fact, when I play it, I wonder if I did sometimes.

== Legacy ==
Professional ratings
Retrospective reviews
Review scores
Source	Rating
AllMusic	2/5 stars
Encyclopedia of Popular Music	1/5 stars
MusicHound Rock	woof!
Pitchfork	5.8/10
The Rolling Stone Album Guide	1/5 stars
Uncut	6/10

In later decades, Never Let Me Down has continued to receive negative reviews and is generally considered one of Bowie's weakest releases. Several made unfavourable comparisons to Tonight. Critic Charles Shaar Murray told journalist Dylan Jones in the 2010s that he thought Never Let Me Down was "just awful" compared to Tonight, a record "of classy filler with no center". In The Rolling Stone Album Guide, Rob Sheffield wrote: "Tonight was an expensive quickie padded with lame covers, while Never Let Me Down made things even worse with originals." AllMusic senior editor Stephen Thomas Erlewine called Never Let Me Down "far more interesting" yet "not as consistent" as Tonight. Reviewing the album's 2018 remaster, O'Leary summarised: "For all of its flaws, Never Let Me Down has a unity – the album has a somewhat charming period-piece feel to it now. It's one of the most time-stamped '1987' records ever made." Looking back in 2019, Ultimate Classic Rock's Patrick Moran considered Never Let Me Down to be "far from being the nadir" of the albums released between Let's Dance and Outside, although it still remains one of his worst. Calling it "an undigested mix of ideas, time signatures and grooves that never quite comes together", Moran concluded: "Never Let Me Down can boast a handful of tracks that are a credible mix of the commercial and the experimental, a characteristic which has always been the mainstay of Bowie's best work."

Many commentators agree that the album's poor production choices marred what they considered good songwriting. In 2018, Chris Ingalls of PopMatters named "Time Will Crawl" and "Zeroes" among those affected by the "headache-inducing [and] overstuffed with garish" production. The author Marc Spitz noted "Day-In Day-Out", "'87 and Cry", "New York's in Love" and "Time Will Crawl" as tracks that are hampered by poor production. Perone contends that the production on "Zeroes" and "Beat of Your Drum" make the tracks sound too much like other contemporary pop of the era "to stand out as distinctive". Dave Thompson highlights "Zeroes", the title track, "Glass Spider", and particularly "Time Will Crawl" as standout tracks, finding Bowie's initial dismissive attitude towards the project "galling" when considering the "strength" of these tracks. The journalist Sean Doyle, editor of the website The Worst Albums Ever, similarly stated that Never Let Me Down is "produced to death": "The extravagant production clashes sharply with the album's often socially minded lyrics, so much so that they become entirely flippant and insincere." The author Benoît Clerc said that the album's excessive use of the Linn 9000 drum machine creates a dated sound with "a cold and impersonal monotony".

Bowie's biographers have given Never Let Me Down mixed assessments, but most consider it better than Tonight. Buckley calls Never Let Me Down more focused and coherent than its predecessor, but finds that it suffers from overproduction. O'Leary similarly calls it Bowie's "ugliest-sounding record" since Diamond Dogs, noting that Bowie produced both records with the intention of "proving himself", which backfired. Trynka states that the record is "bereft of inspiration", but agrees that it is "neither as good nor as bad as Tonight". In a similar statement, Spitz describes Never Let Me Down as "not a terrible album", but "another slothful one" following Tonight and Labyrinth. Perone, likewise, considers it better and more artistically daring than Tonight and writes that it achieves "a better balance between working on pop songs and challenging songs". Nevertheless, he acknowledges its dated production as its biggest flaw. Like Perone, Pegg states that Never Let Me Down is not Bowie's "finest hour, but by no means his worst". He argues that it comes off as more of a David Bowie album than either of its two predecessors. Christopher Sandford describes it as "a shoddily constructed work" that lacked innovation, while Thompson attributes the album's failure to it being "brutally out of sync" with the contemporary music of the time.

In a 2016 retrospective ranking all of Bowie's 26 studio albums from worst to best, Bryan Wawzenek of Ultimate Classic Rock placed Never Let Me Down last, stating "There is no greater let-down in Bowie's catalog than the nadir of what he later called his 'Phil Collins years'," noting "bad idea after bad idea". The writers of Consequence of Sound ranked the album number 21 (out of 28, including the two Tin Machine records) in their 2018 list, arguing that both it and Tonight are due for reevaluations, as "Bowie's weaker efforts are still better than most". In 2023, Rolling Stone ranked Never Let Me Down at number 17 on their list of the "50 Genuinely Horrible Albums by Brilliant Artists", describing the album as a "showcase of horrid Eighties production choices".

== Reissues ==
"Too Dizzy" was deleted from subsequent reissues of Never Let Me Down at Bowie's request, reportedly because it was his least favourite track on the album. Regarding its deletion, Pegg writes: "Its removal from Never Let Me Down has rendered it a latter-day collector's item, but few will feel impelled to hunt it down." Virgin Records (CDVUS 98) re-released the album in the UK on CD with three bonus tracks.

EMI released the second reissue in 1999 featuring 24-bit digitally remastered sound but no bonus tracks, and also without "Too Dizzy". A 2007 Japanese re-release of the album, based on the EMI 1999 re-issue, included "Too Dizzy" on the track listing although the song itself doesn't appear on the CD.

In 2009, the album was reissued in SHM-CD format, carrying the same track listing as the 2007 one. In 2018, the album was remastered by Parlophone and released on CD, LP, and digitally as part of the Loving the Alien (1983–1988) box set; a standalone release of the album on all three aforementioned formats was issued in February of the following year.

== Track listing ==
This was the first Bowie album to have different length songs on the vinyl release than on the cassette and CD, with almost all the songs appearing on the latter having a longer running time than on the former.

=== LP edition ===
All tracks are written by David Bowie, except where noted.

Side one
No.	Title	Writer(s)	Length
1.	"Day-In Day-Out"		4:38
2.	"Time Will Crawl"		4:18
3.	"Beat of Your Drum"		4:32
4.	"Never Let Me Down"	Bowie, Carlos Alomar	4:03
5.	"Zeroes"		5:46

Side two
No.	Title	Writer(s)	Length
1.	"Glass Spider"		4:56
2.	"Shining Star (Makin' My Love)"		4:05
3.	"New York's in Love"		3:55
4.	"'87 and Cry"		3:53
5.	"Too Dizzy"	Bowie, Erdal Kızılçay	3:58
6.	"Bang Bang"	Iggy Pop, Ivan Kral	4:02
Total length:			48:06

=== CD edition ===
All tracks are written by David Bowie, except where noted.

No.	Title	Writer(s)	Length
1.	"Day-In Day-Out"		5:35
2.	"Time Will Crawl"		4:18
3.	"Beat of Your Drum"		5:03
4.	"Never Let Me Down"	Bowie, Alomar	4:03
5.	"Zeroes"		5:46
6.	"Glass Spider"		5:30
7.	"Shining Star (Makin' My Love)"		5:04
8.	"New York's in Love"		4:32
9.	"'87 and Cry"		4:18
10.	"Too Dizzy"	Bowie, Kızılçay	3:58
11.	"Bang Bang"	Pop, Kral	4:28
Total length:			53:07

== Personnel ==
Adapted from the Never Let Me Down liner notes.

- David Bowie – lead and background vocals; guitar; keyboards; Mellotron; Moog synthesiser; harmonica; tambourine
- Carlos Alomar – guitar; guitar synthesiser; tambourine; backing vocals
- Erdal Kızılçay – keyboards; drum programming; bass guitar; trumpet; violins; backing vocals
- Peter Frampton – lead guitar, sitar
- Philippe Saisse – piano
- Carmine Rojas – bass guitar
- Stan Harrison – alto saxophone
- Steve Elson – baritone saxophone
- Lenny Pickett – tenor saxophone
- Earl Gardner – flugelhorn
- Laurie Frink – trumpet
- Errol "Crusher" Bennett – percussion
- Sid McGinnis – lead guitar ("Day-In Day-Out", "Time Will Crawl" and "Bang Bang")
- Mickey Rourke – mid-song rap ("Shining Star (Makin' My Love)")
- Robin Clark – backing vocals
- Lani Groves – backing vocals
- Diva Gray – backing vocals
- Gordon Grody – backing vocals

Production

- David Bowie – producer
- David Richards – producer; assistant mixing engineer
- Malcolm Pollack – engineer
- Bob Clearmountain – mixing
- Bob Ludwig – mastering
- Mick Haggerty – artwork; design
- Greg Gorman – photography
- Andre Gauchat – assistant engineer
- Jon Goldberger – assistant engineer
- Christopher A. Scott – assistant engineer
- Justin Shirley Smith – assistant engineer

== Charts ==
=== Weekly charts ===
Weekly chart performance for Never Let Me Down
Chart (1987)	Peak Position
Australian Albums (Kent Music Report)	19
Austrian Albums (Ö3 Austria)	3
Canadian Albums (RPM)	6
Dutch Albums (MegaCharts)	9
Finnish Albums (Suomen virallinen lista)	4
French Albums (SNEP)	6
Italian Albums (Musica e dischi)	4
Japanese Albums (Oricon)	6
New Zealand Albums (RIANZ)	14
Norwegian Albums (VG-lista)	3
Spanish Albums (PROMUSICAE)	13
Swedish Albums (Sverigetopplistan)	2
Swiss Albums (Hitparade)	18
UK Albums (Official Charts)	6
US Billboard Top Pop Albums	34
West German Albums (GfK Entertainment)	11

=== Year-end charts ===
Year-end chart performance for Never Let Me Down
Chart (1987)	Position
Austrian Albums (Ö3 Austria)	23
Canadian Albums (RPM)	34
Dutch Albums (MegaCharts)	46
European (European Top 100 Albums)	25
French Albums (SNEP)	41
UK Albums Chart	99
US Billboard Top Pop Albums	96

== Sales and certifications ==
Sales and certifications for Never Let Me Down
Region	Certification	Certified units/sales
Australia	—	40,000
Canada (Music Canada)	Platinum	100,000^{^}
France (SNEP)	Gold	100,000^{*}
Italy	—	100,000
United Kingdom (BPI)	Gold	100,000^{^}
United States (RIAA)	Gold	500,000^{^}
Summaries
Worldwide	—	2,600,000
^{*} Sales figures based on certification alone.^{^} Shipments figures based on certification alone.

== Never Let Me Down 2018 ==
Never Let Me Down 2018

Studio album (re-recording) by David Bowie
- Released: 12 October 2018
- Recorded: 1986 (original recordings); January–March 2018 (new instrumentation)
- Studio: Electric Lady (New York City)
- Genres: Pop rock; art rock
- Length: 50:56
- Label: Parlophone
- Producers: David Bowie; David Richards; Mario J. McNulty

David Bowie chronology
Welcome to the Blackout (Live London '78) (2018)	Never Let Me Down 2018 (2018)	Loving the Alien (1983–1988) (2018)

Singles from Never Let Me Down 2018
- 1. "Zeroes (2018 version)" Released: 19 July 2018

Bowie reportedly considered the idea of re-recording tracks from Never Let Me Down almost immediately after meeting Gabrels in the late 1980s, but the guitarist talked him out of it. Bowie contemplated it later in the 1990s and again in 2008, when he had engineer Mario J. McNulty remix "Time Will Crawl" for the self-selected collection of favourites, iSelect. The same mix was later included on the career-spanning compilation Nothing Has Changed (2014). At the time Bowie had said, "Oh, to redo the rest of that album".

In 2018, two years after Bowie's death, the Parlophone label brought the artist's idea to fruition with McNulty as producer, as part of a box set release of Bowie's 1980s albums. Early that year, musicians including Gabrels, David Torn, Sterling Campbell, Tim Lefebvre, Nico Muhly and Laurie Anderson started recording in New York's Electric Lady Studios from January to March. Of these musicians, Torn, Campbell, Lefebvre and Gabrels were all selected by Bowie before he died to take a part in the project. In July 2018, it was announced that a new version of the album, titled Never Let Me Down 2018, would be released in October of that year as part of the 2018 box set Loving the Alien (1983–1988). The album includes "newly 'remixed' artwork", unseen images from the original album's photo-shoot.

McNulty used the experience of the "Time Will Crawl" remix to influence his approach for producing this version of the album. He received the master tapes from the label and "kept all of Bowie's vocals", some of the original acoustic guitars, and "anything distinctive" about the song, such as Alomar's rhythm guitar on "Never Let Me Down" and Frampton's sitar on "Zeroes". He sent rough mixes, called "stems", to each musician as a baseline along with ideas of what they should record. Each musician recorded their parts separately, and were not typically in the studio together, although Torn and Gabrels did record together for one day at one point. He replaced all the drum machines with live drumming from Sterling Campbell.

Original musicians Alomar and Kızılçay were not part of the reproduction. Alomar approved of the result, while Kızılçay was reportedly unhappy to learn of the project. McNulty stated, "It was difficult. Most of the lyrics are quite dark, but everything else about it is almost uplifting. ... I just thought, 'It makes sense to do something bright. '"For "Day-In Day-Out", McNulty discovered that live horns had been recorded but purportedly replaced with synthesised horns for the final mix, so used the original live recording in his 2018 version.

For "New York's in Love", Gabrels wanted the new recording to reflect the change in New York, saying "[the city] isn't really about the blues anymore. It's more multicultural...I wanted to reflect that change with what I did [play]...I told Mario, 'Put up that song and let me see what happens.'...I soloed through the whole song and tried different things, and I reacted to what was going on. When the song ended, Mario looked at me and said, 'Well, that one's done then.' [laughs]". "Too Dizzy" was not re-recorded and does not appear on the final album.

McNulty replaced a lot of synthesiser parts throughout the album with strings, saying, "I was pretty confident I could do a lot of that work with strings." Laurie Anderson replaced Rourke for the remix of "Shining Star", selected because she had been friends with Bowie. Regarding the song, McNulty stated his opinion that "the [original] programming is a mess and the rap comes out of nowhere", continuing that he was "just trying to find the right elements to fit the song".

The release of the box set was preceded by the digital release of the single "Zeroes (2018) (Radio Edit)" in July 2018, and a physical 7" single in September 2018, backed with a radio edit of the 2018 version of "Beat of Your Drum".

=== Critical reception ===
Never Let Me Down 2018 generally received a mixed response from critics. When reviewing Loving the Alien, O'Leary gave 2018 a 6.7 out of 10, finding it to be "an interesting curio" and that "the remake doesn't improve on Never Let Me Down as much as it honors the original's all-over-the-place frustration." Due to Bowie's "over-the-top" vocal performances, he found that the new arrangements and original vocals did not always match, highlighting "Beat of Your Drum" and "Zeroes". Conversely, he gave praise to the new versions of "Day-In Day-Out" and "Glass Spider". Writing for Record Collector, Daryl Easlea praised the reworked album. He found the new production of "Time Will Crawl" and "Beat of Your Drum" improvements that rediscover them as "well-written pop songs", while praising "Zeroes" as "one of Bowie's greatest ever straight-down-the-line songs". He concluded that the 2018 version "is shorn of bombast and there are some truly lovely moments to be found", but expressed disappointment with the replacement of Rourke on "Shining Star".

Ingalls stated: "Never Let Me Down 2018 goes a long way in salvaging those 1987 songs, with a 21st-century sensibility stripping away the overblown aesthetic of those original recordings." Similarly, Michael Rippman considered Never Let Me Down 2018 to be the "crown jewel" of the box set in Consequence of Sound. Langdon Hickman of Treble wrote that with the 2018 version, the album "no longer feels like a glaring misstep in his canon", but rather brings Bowie's original vision to life, sounding closer to his Tin Machine work. Rather than being at the bottom, the new version "manage[s] to cinch itself up against [the] middle tier" of his catalogue. Erlewine, on the other hand, was more negative, writing that "the new Never Let Me Down is neither fish nor fowl: it's not radical enough to be a reimagined record – its core remains the same – and without its ornamental period feel, it seems trapped out of time." Clerc was also negative, arguing that while McNulty's work was admirable, the new album lack's the original spirit and emotion.

=== Track listing ===
Never Let Me Down 2018 track listing
No.	Title	Writer(s)	Length
1.	"Day-In Day-Out"		5:26
2.	"Time Will Crawl"		4:26
3.	"Beat of Your Drum"		5:27
4.	"Never Let Me Down"	Bowie, Alomar	4:26
5.	"Zeroes"		5:06
6.	"Glass Spider"		6:53
7.	"Shining Star (Makin' My Love)" (featuring Laurie Anderson)		5:32
8.	"New York's in Love"		4:33
9.	"'87 and Cry"		4:25
10.	"Bang Bang"	Pop, Kral	4:42
Total length:			50:56

=== Personnel ===
Adapted from the Loving the Alien (1983–1988) liner notes:

Production

- David Bowie – producer; composer
- David Richards – producer
- Mario J. McNulty – mixing; recording; producer
- Recorded at Electric Lady Studios and Incognito Studios, New York City
- Mixed at Incognito Studios, New York City
- Ernesto Valenzuela and Gosha Usov − assistant engineers
- Gustavo Remor − drum technician
- Greg Gorman – photography

Additional musicians

- Reeves Gabrels – guitar
- David Torn – guitar
- Tim Lefebvre – bass guitar
- Sterling Campbell – drums
- Steven Wolf – drums, bass
- Laurie Anderson – spoken word ("Shining Star (Makin' My Love)")
- Mario J. McNulty – percussion
- Nico Muhly – string arrangements ("Beat of Your Drum", "Never Let Me Down" and "Bang Bang")
- Rob Moose – violin ("Beat of Your Drum", "Never Let Me Down" and "Bang Bang")
- Laura Lutzke – violin ("Beat of Your Drum", "Never Let Me Down" and "Bang Bang")
- Nadia Sirota – violin ("Beat of Your Drum", "Never Let Me Down" and "Bang Bang")
- Gabriel Cabezas – violin ("Beat of Your Drum", "Never Let Me Down" and "Bang Bang")
- Gregor Kitzis – string arrangements ("Time Will Crawl")
- Krista Bennion Feeney – violin ("Time Will Crawl")
- Robert Chausow – violin ("Time Will Crawl")
- Martha Mooke – violin ("Time Will Crawl")
- Matthew Goeke – cello ("Time Will Crawl")
