= Tonight (Iggy Pop song) =

1977 song by David Bowie and Iggy Pop

Song by Iggy Pop

from the album Lust for Life
- Released: September 1977
- Genre: Rock
- Length: 3:39
- Label: RCA
- Songwriters: Iggy Pop; David Bowie
- Producer: David Bowie

"Tonight" is a song written by David Bowie and Iggy Pop for the latter's second solo studio album, Lust for Life (1977). The song was later made into the title-track for Bowie's own album Tonight (1984).

== David Bowie version ==
"Tonight"

Single by David Bowie

from the album Tonight
- B-side: "Tumble and Twirl"
- Released: 26 November 1984
- Recorded: May 1984
- Studio: Le Studio, Morin-Heights, Quebec, Canada
- Genre: Pop; blue-eyed soul; reggae
- Length: 3:43
- Label: EMI
- Songwriters: David Bowie; Iggy Pop
- Producers: David Bowie; Derek Bramble; Hugh Padgham

David Bowie singles chronology
"Blue Jean" (1984)	"Tonight" (1984)	"This Is Not America" (1985)

David Bowie covered the song with guest singer Tina Turner in 1984 for his sixteenth studio album of the same name. One of three Iggy Pop covers on the album, it was recorded as a duet with Turner, but the single release was only credited to Bowie. The original spoken-word introduction to the 1977 version, establishing that the lyric is addressed to a lover dying of a heroin overdose, was excised from Bowie's version because Bowie regarded it as an "idiosyncrasy" of Iggy Pop that did not match his own personal vocabulary. Bowie also stated that he didn't want to "inflict" that part of the song on Tina Turner, either. The reggae-style song, which features a repeated sample from Aretha Franklin's version of "Spanish Harlem", reached No. 53 on both the UK Singles Chart and the Billboard Hot 100.

=== Track listing ===
- 7" single
1. "Tonight" – 3:43
2. "Tumble and Twirl" – 4:56
- 12" single
1. "Tonight" (Vocal Dance Mix) – 4:29
2. "Tumble and Twirl" (Extended Dance Mix) – 5:03
3. "Tonight" (Dub Mix) – 4:18

=== Personnel ===
- David Bowie – vocals
- Tina Turner – vocals
- Carlos Alomar – guitar
- Carmine Rojas – bass guitar
- Omar Hakim – drums
- Guy St Onge – marimba

Production

- David Bowie – producer
- Derek Bramble – producer
- Hugh Padgham – producer

=== Chart performance ===
Chart (1984–1985)	Peak position
Australia (Kent Music Report)	70
Austria (Ö3 Austria Top 40)	22
Canada Top Singles (RPM)	21
Ireland (IRMA)	24
Netherlands (Single Top 100)	45
Switzerland (Schweizer Hitparade)	23
UK Singles (Official Charts)	53
US Billboard Hot 100	53
US Dance Club Songs (Billboard)	28
US Mainstream Rock (Billboard)	32

== Tina Turner and David Bowie live version ==
"Tonight (Live)"

Single by Tina Turner duet with David Bowie

from the album Tina Live in Europe
- B-side: "River Deep – Mountain High" (Live)
- Released: 28 November 1988 (EU)
- Recorded: 23 March 1985
- Venue: National Exhibition Centre, Birmingham
- Label: Capitol
- Songwriters: David Bowie; Iggy Pop
- Producer: Terry Britten

Tina Turner singles chronology
"Addicted to Love (Live)" (1988)	"Tonight (Live)" (1988)	"634-5789 (Live)" (1988)

Music video
- "Tonight" (Live) on YouTube

David Bowie would perform the song live with Tina Turner at the latter's 23 March 1985 concert at the National Exhibition Centre in Birmingham. This version was included on Turner's live album Tina Live in Europe three years later, and also released as a single in late 1988, then becoming a number-one hit in the Netherlands.

=== Charts and certifications ===
==== Weekly charts ====
Year	Chart	Peak position
1985	Spain (Los 40 Principales)	6

Chart (1988–1989)	Peak position
Belgium (Ultratop 50 Flanders)	3
Europe (European Hot 100 Singles)	70
Germany (Official German Charts)	39
Netherlands (Dutch Top 40)	1
Netherlands (Single Top 100)	1
Switzerland (Schweizer Hitparade)	17

==== Year-end charts ====
Chart (1989)	Position
Belgium (Ultratop 50 Flanders)	18
Netherlands (Dutch Top 40)	5
Netherlands (Single Top 100)	11

==== Certifications and sales ====
Region	Certification	Certified units/sales
Netherlands (NVPI)	Gold	75,000^{^}
^{^} Shipments figures based on certification alone.
