= Ricky Gardiner =

Scottish guitarist and composer (1948–2022)

- Born: 31 August 1948; Edinburgh, Scotland
- Died: 13 May 2022 (aged 73)
- Genres: Punk rock, rock and roll, progressive rock
- Occupations: Guitarist, composer
- Instruments: Guitar
- Formerly of: Iggy Pop, David Bowie, Beggars Opera

Ricky Gardiner (31 August 1948 – 13 May 2022) was a Scottish guitarist and composer.

== Biography ==
Gardiner joined his first band, the Vostoks, at school in 1962. He then joined both The Kingbees and The System, with whom he formed Beggars Opera in 1969.

He played in his own outfit with this band, Beggars Opera, and also with friends David Bowie and Iggy Pop. For Bowie he played lead guitar on the 1977 album Low. For Pop he worked on his album Lust for Life the same year: the issue included "The Passenger", regarded as one of Pop's best songs, for which Gardiner composed the music. Bowie biographer David Buckley described it as being "possessed with one of the greatest riffs of all time".

On 19 October 1977, Gardiner was selected by Tony Visconti to play guitar for the pre-recorded backing of Bowie's performance on "Heroes" on the BBC's Top of the Pops. The recording was made at Good Earth Studios in Soho, London, with Bowie, Visconti, and pianist Sean Mayes. Gardiner emulated Robert Fripp's feedback-driven guitar line. "I was asked to reproduce Robert Fripp's line. As we went through the song, my amplifier started dying. As the song finished, so did the amp."

From the 1970s, Gardiner played and composed in a variety of music styles, including ambient, classical, and rock.

In 2017, photographs Gardiner took at the Château d'Hérouville, during the making Low in 1977, were included in a hardcover book that accompanied the vinyl and CD box set of A New Career in a New Town (1977–1982), alongside photographs by Anton Corbijn, Helmut Newton, Andrew Kent, Steve Shapiro, Duffy, and others.

Gardiner said that he suffered from electromagnetic hypersensitivity, which he believed he contracted through exposure to high levels of computer radiation and magnetic fields.

Gardiner died on 13 May 2022, aged 73, after a long battle with Parkinson's disease.
