= Jareth =

Fictional character

- David Bowie as Jareth in Labyrinth.
- First appearance: Labyrinth (1986)
- Created by: Jim Henson; Dennis Lee
- Designed by: Brian Froud
- Portrayed by: David Bowie

In-universe information
- Gender: Male
- Title(s): King of the Goblins; Ruler of the Labyrinth
- Occupation: Monarch, magician
- Nationality: Goblin Kingdom (the Underground)

Jareth is a fictional character and the main antagonist of the 1986 musical fantasy film Labyrinth. Portrayed by David Bowie, Jareth is the powerful and enigmatic king of the goblins to whom protagonist Sarah Williams wishes away her baby brother Toby. Jareth gives Sarah thirteen hours to retrieve the baby from his castle at the centre of an enormous labyrinth, during which time he sets obstacles in her path and tries to entice her away from her quest.

The character was created by director Jim Henson and writer Dennis Lee, and designed by Brian Froud. Several contemporary musicians were initially considered for the role besides Bowie, including Sting, Michael Jackson and Prince. Henson first approached Bowie in 1983 to offer him the part, and the character was developed with Bowie in mind—who was also hired to write the songs for Labyrinth, performing three in the film as Jareth.

Conceptualised as the inner fantasy of Sarah, Jareth's character design was influenced by Heathcliff from Wuthering Heights and Rochester from Jane Eyre, as well as the Scarlet Pimpernel, medieval knights, Grimm's Fairy Tales, ballet dancers, contemporary rock stars, and "leather boys" such as Johnny Strabler from The Wild One.

Reception to the character has been generally positive, with critics praising Jareth's magnetism and costuming. Bowie's performance as Jareth, while alternately lauded and derided by contemporary critics, has since become one of his most celebrated film appearances.

== Development ==
=== Conception and writing ===
Labyrinth started as a collaboration between director Jim Henson and conceptual designer Brian Froud following their previous collaboration, The Dark Crystal. In making Labyrinth, Henson wanted to create a film that combined elements of fairy tales and classical stories in a script that would appeal to a modern audience. According to Froud, he and Henson decided to have human characters as the lead roles in order to make Labyrinth "more accessible and immediate" than The Dark Crystal, which had featured only puppets. Henson explained that they structured Labyrinth "in a way that the human is really carrying the whole picture" and acts as a "bridge" between the fantastical puppets and the audience. In the film's initial discussions between Henson, Froud, artist Wendy Froud and writer Dennis Lee, the character of Jareth was first conceived as a shapeshifting "prince of darkness" who kidnaps a king's baby, spiriting it away to the Castle of Darkness at the centre of a great labyrinth inhabited by goblins. Wishing to avoid similarities to Ridley Scott's original fairy tale film Legend, which was in development near the same time as Labyrinth, Henson and his team made significant changes to Labyrinth's main characters and story. They decided to have the protagonist be an adolescent girl, Sarah, who journeys to the centre of the Labyrinth to rescue her baby brother after wishing him away to the goblins. Describing the subtext of Labyrinth as being "about the growing-up process of maturity ... a young girl right at that point between girl and woman, shedding her childhood thoughts for adult thoughts", Henson intended to partly represent this in the figure of Jareth, who exists in Sarah's imagination. Henson said of the character:

"He's never completely evil. He's more the antagonist in the story than an arch villain. He represents a lot of things that are a part of Sarah's world, what she's trying to figure out and what she's going through. The movie plays off the elements of Sarah's real life vs. the grid of her imagination. [Jareth] has no reality except what Sarah gives him, which she can constantly change."

— Director Jim Henson to the Daily Press.

In Lee's early version of the story, Jareth had solved the Labyrinth long ago but "never had the courage to return to the real world". During the drafting stage, Henson and screenwriter Terry Jones had a fundamental disagreement about Jareth's character and what the story would be about. Jones envisaged Jareth as a "hollow man" who merely seems "all powerful to begin with" but is actually using the Labyrinth to "keep people from getting to his heart." In Jones' original script, Jareth represented "people who are more interested in manipulating the world than actually baring themselves at all", and is destroyed by Sarah reaching the Labyrinth's centre. This idea "didn't mean anything" to Henson, who intended his film to be a girl's coming of age story.

The casting of David Bowie as Jareth, who was also hired to write songs for the film, resulted in many script changes and had a significant impact on the character's prominence in the story. Jones had intended for the Goblin King not to appear until Sarah reaches the centre of the Labyrinth, as he felt that if Jareth "can appear anywhere he likes there's no contest". With the thought of Bowie starring in the film, Henson wanted Jareth to sing and appear throughout the film, and asked Jones to re-write the script to allow the character numerous appearances and songs. After receiving a redraft of the script, Bowie found that it lacked humour and considered withdrawing his involvement in the project as a result. To ensure Bowie's involvement, Henson asked Jones rework the script again to restore the humour of some the previous drafts. Shortly before filming began, Henson solicited Elaine May to improve the characterisations of Sarah and Jareth; her contributions "humaniz[ed] the characters" and pleased Henson to the extent that her material was incorporated into the film's shooting script.

=== Casting and filming ===
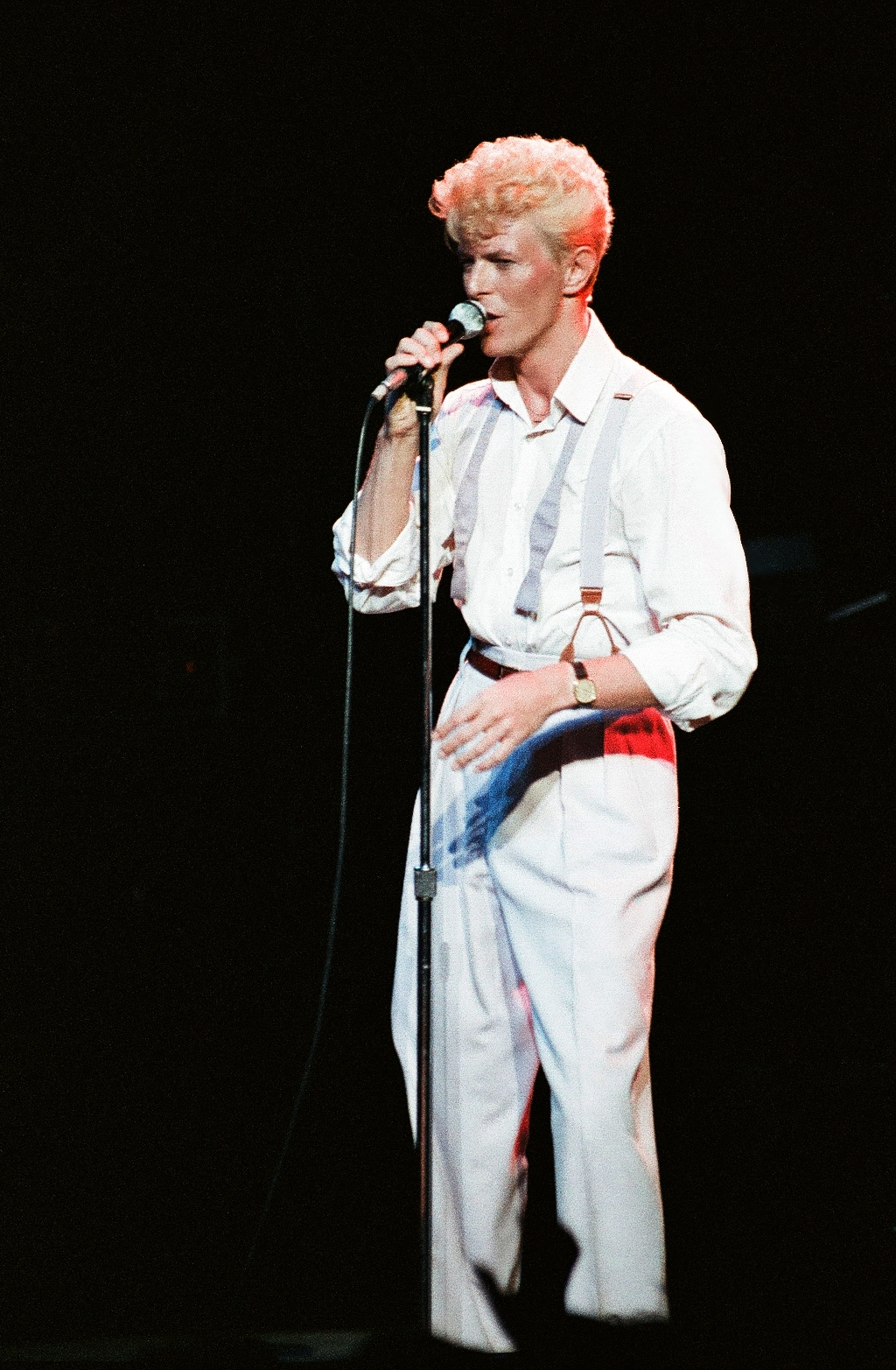
English singer-songwriter and actor David Bowie (pictured 1983) portrayed Jareth. He also wrote the songs for Labyrinth.

According to Henson, Jareth was at one stage going to be a creature in the same vein as his goblin subjects, which were portrayed through the use of puppets and animatronics produced by Henson's Creature Shop. Deciding that the role should be filled by a live actor, Henson initially considered offering it to Simon MacCorkindale or Kevin Kline. After Labyrinth score composer Trevor Jones proposed the idea of using contemporary music for the film, Henson decided he wanted a big, charismatic pop star to sing and act as the Goblin King, "someone who could change the film's whole musical style". Several contemporary singers were considered for the role besides Bowie, including Sting, Michael Jackson and Prince. Henson's first choice was Bowie, whom his sons Brian and John convinced him to offer the role to as they believed Bowie would have the most lasting appeal with audiences. Familiar with his music, the Hensons had also seen Bowie act on Broadway in the play The Elephant Man, and felt that his "other-worldliness" and energy would be a good match for the fantastic creatures and settings planned for the film.

"I wanted to put two characters of flesh and bone in the middle of all these artificial creatures," Jim Henson explained, "and David Bowie embodies a certain maturity, with his sexuality, his disturbing aspect, all sorts of things that characterize the adult world." Expounding that Jareth "must have something attractive and menacing about him" and be both "positive and negative at the same time", Henson said that Bowie "had the advantage of being able to be seductive, threatening, scary", and was able to create the range he wanted in the character. Froud similarly felt that Bowie was the perfect choice to play Jareth, writing that his "protean persona" made him well-suited to the role, as "Jareth needed to be a mercurial figure who would constantly throw Sarah off balance emotionally." While Labyrinth was made as a film that would appeal to children, Henson also hoped Bowie's presence and musical contributions would make the film more accessible to older demographics.

Henson met Bowie in the summer of 1983 to seek his involvement, as Bowie was in the U.S. for his Serious Moonlight Tour at the time. During a meeting in New York on 18 June 1984, Henson showed Bowie some of Froud's concept art to pique his interest in the film. "That impressed me for openers," Bowie later said, "but he also gave me a tape of The Dark Crystal, which really excited me. I could see the potential of adding humans to his world of creatures". Henson continued to pursue Bowie for the role of the Goblin King, developing the character with him in mind and sending him each revision of the script for his comments. The two men met again in Gstaad, Switzerland on 11 February 1985, and Bowie's deal was set on 15 February 1985.

Bowie began shooting his scenes on 3 June 1985. On playing the role of Jareth, Bowie said, "I loved the magic, the mystery." Henson stated that Bowie acted his scenes as written in the script while occasionally contributing ideas, and "needed very little direction, because his own characterization [of Jareth] was always right on." However, Bowie initially had difficulty acting with the puppet characters, as the characters' voices did not come from the puppets themselves but from off-stage which he found disorientating. Henson recalled that Bowie's first few scenes were with the puppet Hoggle, "and he kept wanting to look off-stage to where the voice was coming from ... instead of where Hoggle, the puppet, actually was. It took him a while to get used to that aspect of filming." Bowie completed many of his scenes in two or three takes, except for very technical scenes or those involving complex puppets. Bowie enjoyed making the film, stating, "Labyrinth was great fun to do".

Bowie's two dancing scenes were choreographed by Charles Augins and Cheryl McFadden respectively. Jareth's elaborate crystal-ball contact juggling manipulations were choreographed and performed by juggler Michael Moschen. Henson wanted Jareth to have a visible skill with which to express his magical powers, and said that Moschen's work was "as close to real magic as anything that I really know." During filming, Moschen crouched behind Bowie's cloak and placed his hands through the sleeves to replace Bowie's arms. This meant that Moschen could not see the objects he was juggling, and it took many takes to film the scenes with the crystal balls.

=== Design and influences ===
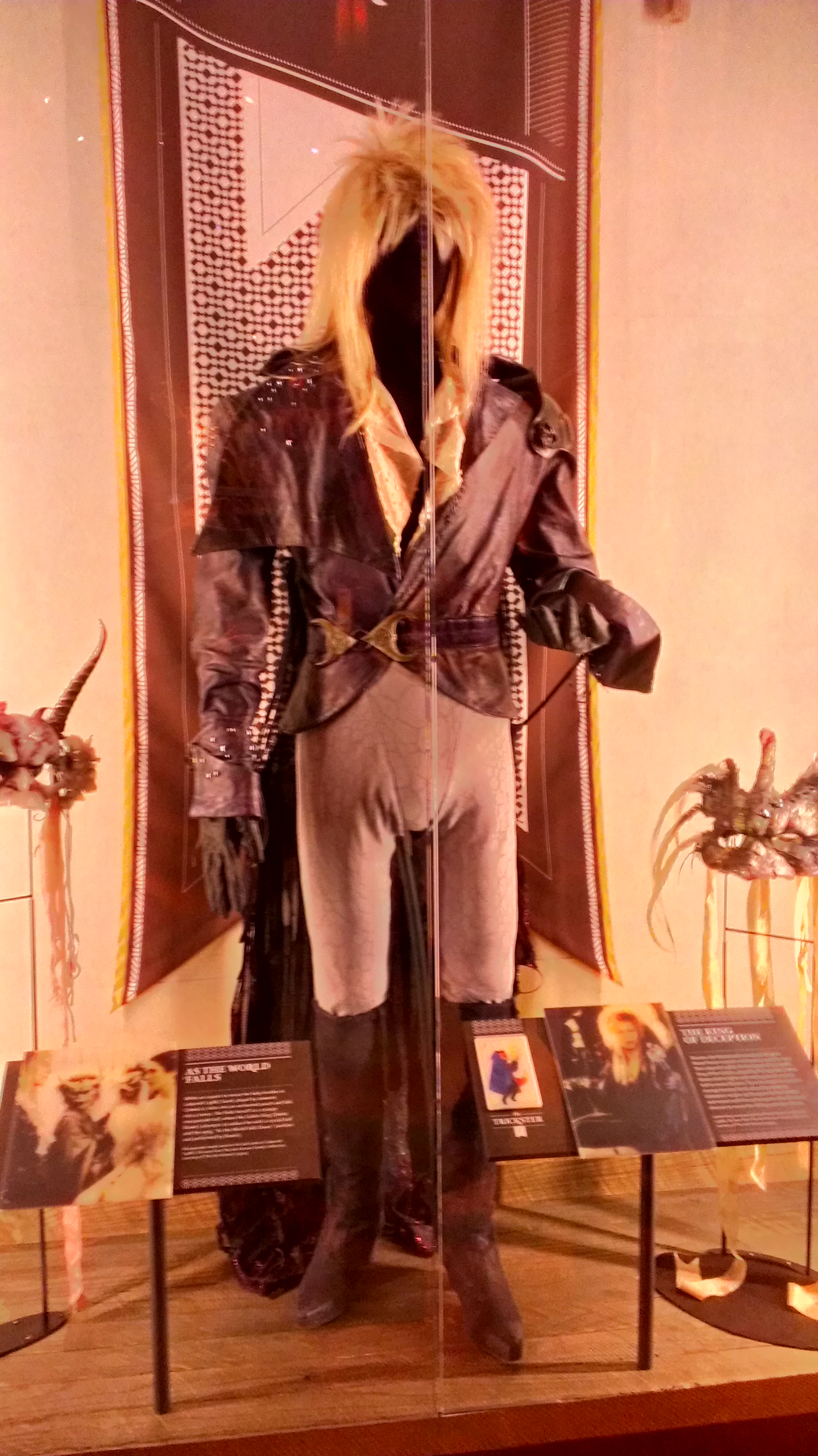
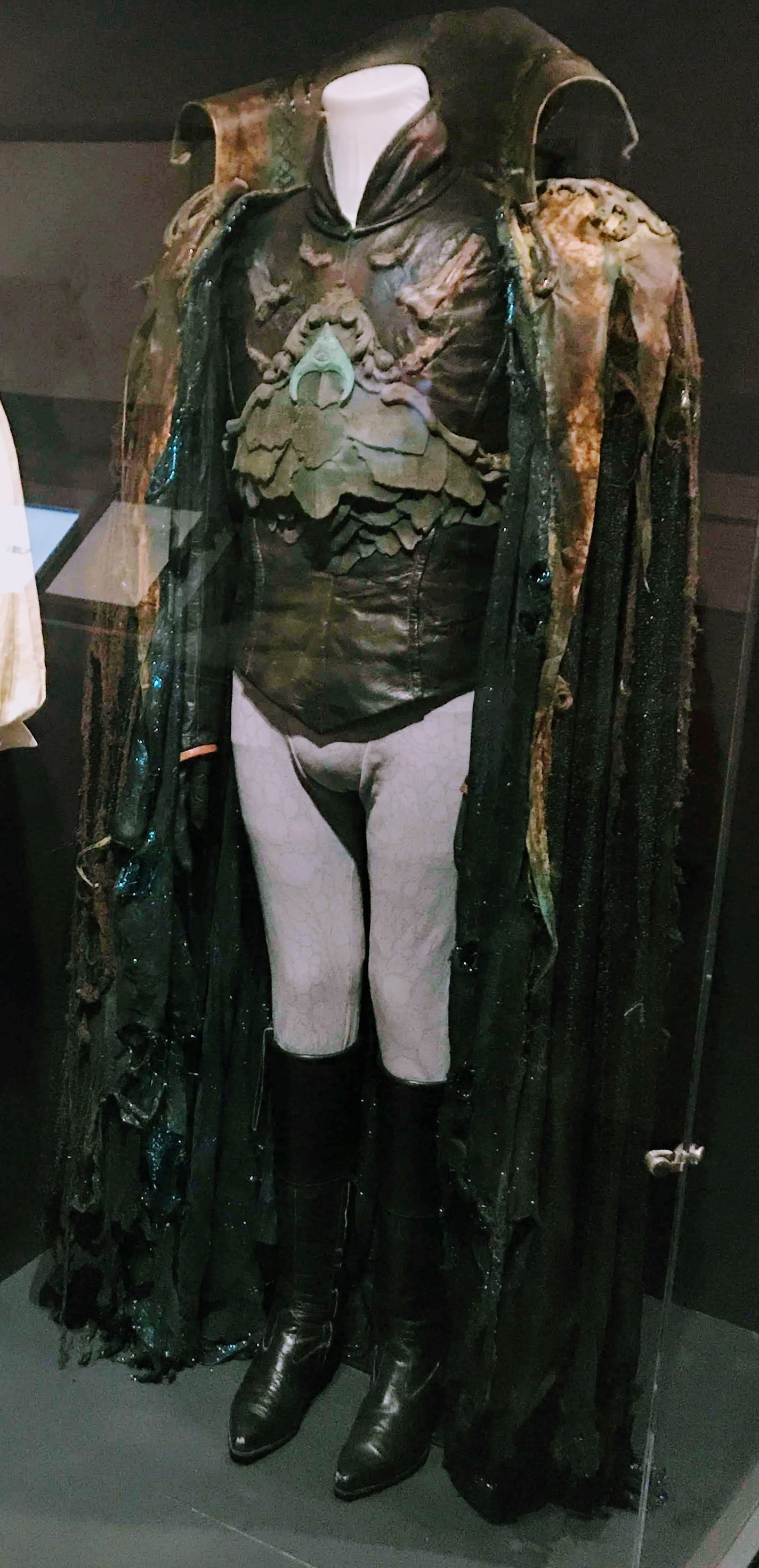
Two of the costumes worn by Bowie as Jareth

Froud stated that Jareth is "Sarah's inner fantasy, a figure made up of her daydreams and nightmares ... He is seen, through her eyes, as part dangerous goblin, part glamorous rock star". The concept behind the character is that Sarah, having reached the age of sexual awakening, creates Jareth as the living embodiment of her adolescent interests and desires; he is a dream figure who reflects her inner "romantic turmoil." Froud sought to reflect this in the character's outfits and appearance, and drew upon classic "romantic dangerous" figures from a range of literary sources. In his afterword to the 20th-anniversary edition of The Goblins of Labyrinth, Froud wrote that Jareth references "the romantic figures of Heathcliff in Wuthering Heights and a brooding Rochester from Jane Eyre" and the "transfiguring" Scarlet Pimpernel. Jareth's costumes are intentionally eclectic, drawing on the image of Marlon Brando's leather jacket from The Wild One as well as that of a medieval knight "with the worms of death eating through his armour" from Grimms' Fairy Tales. Jareth's close-fitting tights are a reference to ballet dancers, such as Mikhail Baryshnikov. The Goblin King also has a popstar aspect; Froud designed him a sceptre topped with a crystal ball as "a visual echo of a microphone". The sceptre also functions as a swagger stick and riding crop, as Froud regarded Jareth as "the proud lord of the manor, lord of his goblin domain, with his hounds at his feet, ready to go hunting for human souls." Hanging from his neck and adorning his leather jacket and breastplate, Jareth wears the "goblin symbol". Jeweller Mitch Nugent was commissioned to make the baroque amulet and sceptre. Jareth's cloak was designed by costume designer Vin Burnham.

The design of the character's countenance and hairstyle went through various stages. Henson revealed, "For a while, we thought we'd give [Bowie] lots of prosthetic make-up, and horns", while Froud said at one stage they attempted to make Jareth's hair look "wolf-like and feral". They eventually settled on "just the wild Kabuki hair", a multi-layered blond wig which was also reminiscent of "a popstar from a rock band". Bowie also gave input into the character's appearance.

For the ballroom scene, Froud and costume designer Ellis Flyte fashioned Jareth a velvet tailcoat shot with blue, black and silver, and embroidered with broken jewels and mirrors on the front and shoulders. Worn underneath this was a silver silk satin shirt with a jabot, and black leggings printed with a silver snakeskin pattern.

Froud's son Toby, who as an infant played Labyrinth's character of the same name, stated that the Goblin King is meant to be a sexual icon and a temptation to Sarah, alluding to "the dark fairy in folklore [who] are meant to be tempting." This fact was accentuated by a prominent codpiece added to Bowie's costumes. According to puppeteer coordinator Brian Henson, the codpiece had to be reduced from its original size after the studio reviewed the rushes from the first scene shot with Bowie and deemed his costume inappropriate. The codpiece was reduced for Bowie's subsequent scenes. However, due to Jim Henson's dislike for reshooting, Bowie's first scene (the "Blind Beggar" scene) was not reshot. Brian Henson further expanded on the sexual symbolism of the codpiece: "Sarah is at a point in her life where she's a child but she's becoming a woman, she's in that cusp period, and the character of Jareth is sort of an aggressive, adult, masculine sexuality, that is both terrifying to her and very attractive to her. So yes, it's definitely part of the storytelling that he should have this codpiece that's a masculine, sexual image".

=== Personality ===
"I thought David Bowie was exceptionally clever to not bring a truly evil and angry and fiendish tone to his role as the villain. He was so deft at being devilish more than evil, dangerous maybe, but not a character fraught only with ill-will."

— Jim Henson on Bowie's portrayal of Jareth.

According to Brian Froud, Jareth is a Romantic hero, a rebel, and an outsider. Jim Henson said that Jareth's "role is similar to being the leader of a gang. Everyone in the kingdom does what he says until Sarah comes along—and she defies him. The goblins [Jareth] controls are like members of his gang. He treats them terribly but they do anything he says." However, Froud said that "in many ways the character is ridiculous" as he is never quite able to control the unruly goblins. Jareth has to remind the goblins to laugh every time he makes a joke. Donal Lynch of the Irish Independent observed that Jareth's personality continually "swerve[s] from playful to imperious and back again."

"[David Bowie] played this wonderful role where he's kind of making fun of the personality of a rock star. He plays this overly flamboyant, spoiled rotten, self-centered King of the Goblins. He had a wonderful sense of humor ... I think he knew he was kind of making fun of himself, in a fun way."

— Brian Henson on Bowie's performance.

Brooding and discontent, Jareth has reluctantly inherited his position and runs his kingdom under duress, according to David Bowie. Though he would prefer a different life, Jareth is resigned to his role as Goblin King and runs his kingdom "as well as he can", Bowie said, expressing the character's weariness at having to "sort out the whole situation" whenever the goblins collect a baby that has been wished away. Bowie stated that Jareth is not evil; however, he described the king as spoilt, childish and accustomed to getting his own way. "I think Jareth is, at best, a romantic; but at worst, he's a spoilt child, vain and temperamental—kind of like a rock 'n' roll star!" Bowie said, adding that the king is "completely smitten" by the strong-willed Sarah. He described the dynamic between Jareth and Sarah as being like a battle of wits, without true hostility. According to Bowie, Jareth is lonely and longs for companionship, a sentiment which underlies his pleading for Sarah to remain with him in the Underground.

Ed Power of The Telegraph wrote that Jareth is a "mirror image" of Sarah: "both are immature, temperamental and peevish." Brian Henson described Jareth as a "Peter Pan type of character" who is "locked in a sort of teenage sensibility ... He's a little petulant and unpredictable and he's spoiled rotten". However, Jareth "learns his lesson", Henson said, remarking that Labyrinth is a coming of age for both Sarah and Jareth.

=== Music ===
Jareth is the only main character to sing in Labyrinth. Bowie performed as the character three of the five songs that he wrote for the film: "Magic Dance", "As the World Falls Down" and "Within You". The film's theme song, "Underground", has also been interpreted by some critics as being from Jareth's point of view.

"Magic Dance", which has been described as a "bouncy pop" song, is performed along with dance by Jareth and his goblins to cheer up baby Toby at the castle. The dialogue starting with the phrase, "You remind me of the babe," that occurs between Jareth and the goblins at the beginning of the song is a direct reference to an exchange between Cary Grant and Shirley Temple in the 1947 film The Bachelor and the Bobby-Soxer. Cinemaps: An Atlas of 35 Great Movies authors Andrew DeGraff and A.D. Jameson suggest the significance of this reference is that The Bachelor and the Bobby-Soxer is about a teenage girl's crush on an older man, just as Sarah is infatuated with the fictitious Goblin King.

"As the World Falls Down", which Rolling Stone described as a "sparkling, subdued ballad", soundtracks a dream sequence at a masquerade ball. Though Jareth does not perform the song directly, he mouths the words of the song to Sarah as they are dancing towards the end of the sequence. Henson wanted the song to be "fairly old-fashioned in its sentiments", according to Bowie. A love song, the lyrics promise everlasting loyalty and affection.

Jareth sings "Within You" at the film's climax before his final confrontation with Sarah at the top of his castle. "I had to write something that sounded like stone walls and crumbling power," Bowie said of the song, describing its overall effect combined with the film's visuals as "very tragic and slightly disturbing." Adam Trainer of Senses of Cinema described "Within You" as "a dark, tortured-sounding song of love's betrayal. Throughout, the lyrics emphasise the lengths to which Jareth has gone to facilitate Sarah's self-indulgent quest." Calling the song "haunting and touching" whilst being the character's most villainous song, Sean Rehbein of Keen Gamer wrote that it "looks into his motivations, and brings forth his vulnerabilities ... as Jareth realizes all his plans haven't worked, and his game is seen as nothing but wicked, instead of charming, by Sarah." Commenting on Bowie's vocal performance of the song, iHeartRadio podcast hosts Robert Lamb and Joe McCormick noted "parts of it where he's very firm and commanding, and then other bits where his voice is trailing off and growing weak, almost like he [Jareth] is dying." Labyrinth: The Ultimate Visual History authors Paula Block and Terry Erdmann suggest Jareth's mournful repeated line at the end of the song, "I can't live within you", is his acknowledgement that he exists only in Sarah's imagination, which she is on the verge of leaving behind.

=== Owl ===
The white barn owl that appears in Labyrinth "is one of the many manifestations of the Goblin King", according to the film's early production notes. Henson described the owl as "vaguely...the symbol of the Goblin King." Jareth as the owl was performed by a live owl and a puppet owl built by the Creature Shop in alternating shots. The computer-generated owl that flies over the film's opening credits was created by animators Larry Yaeger and Bill Kroyer, and marked the first use of a realistic CGI animal in a film.

== In Labyrinth ==
King Jareth is inadvertently summoned by Sarah, a discontented teenager who has rashly wished her baby brother Toby away to the goblins. Jareth urges Sarah to forget about her brother, offering her a crystal ball containing her dreams in exchange for the baby, but Sarah declines, regretting her wish and insistent on getting Toby back. Unable to dissuade her, Jareth reluctantly informs Sarah that Toby is in his castle at the centre of the Labyrinth, and that to retrieve the baby she must solve the Labyrinth in thirteen hours or Toby will remain in the goblin realm forever.

As Sarah navigates the Labyrinth, inside the castle Jareth and his goblins entertain Toby while monitoring Sarah's progress through a crystal. Jareth is perturbed by how far she has travelled, and that she does not give up. After Sarah bribes a dwarf named Hoggle into helping her, Jareth appears before the pair. Confronting Hoggle, Jareth questions the dwarf's loyalty, as he had been supposed to lead Sarah back to the beginning of the Labyrinth, and threatens to suspend him over the Bog of Eternal Stench if he continues to help her. Jareth then asks Sarah how she is finding his challenge. Sarah belittles the Labyrinth as being easy, and in response Jareth takes away three hours from her time limit and summons "the Cleaners", a goblin-driven steel machine, to chase her and Hoggle.

Later, as Hoggle is running to rescue Sarah from a group of wild forest creatures called the Fireys, Jareth confronts the dwarf again, reproaching him for continuing to help Sarah against his warnings. He gives Hoggle an enchanted peach with the instruction to give it to Sarah. Jareth also warns Hoggle that if Sarah kisses him, Jareth will turn him into the "Prince of the Land of Stench". When Sarah kisses Hoggle in thanks for saving her from the Fireys, they are both sent to the Bog. Jareth releases crystals that float like bubbles to the forest, where Sarah has eaten the peach and fallen into an amnesiac enchantment. The crystals draw near her and she is transported into a dream of a masquerade ball, where she finds Jareth and they dance. Eventually Sarah escapes the dream by smashing the walls of the crystal and, unbeknownst to Jareth, she remembers Toby and continues her journey to save him.

In his castle, Jareth is informed that Sarah has gotten past the gate guard to the Goblin City. Alarmed by the news, he orders the goblins to hide Toby and sends his goblin troops to stop Sarah from reaching the castle, but the defence is unsuccessful. Sarah finds Jareth in a gravity-defying room of staircases and he leads her on a chase. Eventually she spots Toby and tries to get to him as Jareth sings a mournful song. In their final confrontation, Jareth reminds Sarah that he took Toby because she wished it and says he is exhausted from living up to her expectations of him. Jareth offers Sarah her dreams, entreating her to let him rule her and promising to be her slave if she will fear, love and obey him. She tells him he has no power over her. Defeated, Jareth returns Sarah and Toby home safely and turns into an owl, flying away. His final appearance is as the owl, briefly watching from outside as a number of goblins and other characters from the Labyrinth celebrate with Sarah in her room, before flying away into the night.

== Themes and analysis ==
Jareth is Sarah's fantasy, existing in her imagination. Jim Henson stated, "[Jareth] has no reality except what Sarah gives him, which she can constantly change." Froud confirmed, "We're not looking at reality, we're inside [Sarah]'s head ... [Jareth]'s an amalgam of the inner fantasies of this girl." The Goblin King is a character in Sarah's book The Labyrinth, from which she acts out scenes at the start of the film. Like many of the things Sarah encounters in the Labyrinth, Jareth resembles an object in her room; a Goblin King statuette can be seen on her dressing table. Jareth also resembles the male romantic co-star of Sarah's absent actress mother (Bowie, as the unnamed actor, briefly appears in photos in Sarah's room). Froud stated that Jareth is made up of both Sarah's daydreams and nightmares and is seen "through her eyes, as part dangerous goblin, part glamorous rock star".

Critics note the subtext of Labyrinth as Sarah's coming of age, with the Goblin King as a representation of her sexual awakening. Describing the character as "very attractive, very male, a Byronic hero with a twist of menace", Francie Noyes of The Arizona Republic identified Jareth as adolescent Sarah's "image of the adult male, appealing and terrifying at the same time." Heartthrobs: A History of Women and Desire author Carol Dyhouse wrote that Jareth exudes sexual allure, describing him as "a bad-boy Prince of Darkness with biker chic and super-natural overtones." Cat Lafuente of TheList.com identified Jareth's crystal balls and sceptre as phallic symbols along with the genital bulge in his trousers, which she wrote represent sexual maturity and "serve to show ... that adulthood is just around the corner" for Sarah. Michael Booth of The Denver Post wrote that Jareth's "alternately fey or menacing" demeanor is "true to the fairy-tale tradition [wherein] the adolescent girl is always supposed to be threatened or enticed by adulthood."

"I think that, at some point, it is every young girl's fantasy to go to a different world [...] and have this great love interest who's so far beyond what you could ever, ever have or ever want because he's so much older. That happens for Sarah [...] But the filmmakers were very careful to make it innocent, because Sarah is innocent."

— Wendy Froud on Sarah's fantasy of Jareth.

Author Elycia Arendt identified Jareth as the folkloric archetype of the Demon Lover, who "appears to be a very sensual and fabulous catch," but comes with a cost; Jareth offers Sarah her dreams and desires for the price of giving up her baby brother and, potentially, her freedom. Noting the parallel between Jareth and Sarah's actress mother's love interest, some commentors have discerned Jareth as a manifestation of Sarah's wish to become like her mother and abandon her family for a fantastical romance. Jareth has been interpreted as representing the danger inherent in losing oneself in one's imagination; although he tempts Sarah with her fairytale fantasies and offers freedom from her responsibilities, Hodder & Stoughton editor Anne Perry ascribed Sarah's maturation and growth during the movie to her realisation that what Jareth offers "isn't power and freedom, but isolation and selfishness." Bridget McGovern of Tor.com likened the Goblin King to the eponymous villain of Hans Christian Andersen's The Snow Queen, writing that such characters "tend to represent an unsettling mix of childhood fantasies and adult fears and desires; they draw their would-be victims in through a disturbing blend of infantilization and seduction". Sam Karnick in Chronicles described Jareth's bargain as a "Faustian" one. Discerning Labyrinth as having Christian themes, scholar Donna R. White identified Jareth as symbolic of Satan due to his constant tempting of Sarah. Like Satan, Jareth is associated with snakes (conjuring one in his first scene) and during his final appearance to Sarah at the top of his castle Jareth tempts her to give up her autonomy, similar to Satan's temptation of Christ on the mountain. Jareth's use of tainted fruit to impede the story's heroine has been identified as a mythological motif tracing back to the Wicked Queen of "Snow White" and the serpent who tempts Eve in the Garden of Eden, as well as an intertextual connection to the Witch's field of sedative poppies in the 1939 film The Wizard of Oz.

Due to his royal status, Jareth fits the fairy tale male love interest archetype, with several commentors noting that his final proposal to Sarah befits the traditional fairy tale ending of a wedding as found in stories such as "Cinderella", "Snow White" and "Sleeping Beauty". Jareth offers Sarah the chance to, "like others did before her ... escap[e] a wicked stepmother by running to the arms of a wealthy suitor," observed L. S. Kilroy of Minerva magazine. Scholar Tammy H. Gladwin wrote that Labyrinth "overtly deconstructs the Prince Charming motif" as Jareth promises to make Sarah's dreams come true only if she submit to his domination, "in an effort to debunk the myths that young girls are taught to believe". Sarah Marshall of Bitch Media commented that Jareth's proposal highlights the often-abusive nature of many fairy tale romances, with Stephanie Zvan of Uncanny Magazine writing that his "inhuman" bargain promises chivalry and romance under patriarchy. Trisha Smith and Jon Riccio in Fairy Tale Review likened Jareth to the cursed Prince in the fairy tale "Beauty and the Beast", as he "is lonely and cruel, beastly in his actions" and has his heart broken by Sarah; however, Sarah Monette of Uncanny Magazine refuted that Labyrinth is a "Beauty and the Beast" retelling because Sarah does not reform Jareth, writing that "Just as Sarah refuses Jareth, Labyrinth refuses the incredibly dangerous myth that the love of a good woman can change a brute (beast) into a prince". According to Kelcie Mattson of Bitch Flicks, Jareth embodies both patriarchy and the loss of Sarah's innocence, "a man dictating to a woman what he deems is the best thing for her, while also introducing an initiation into the sexual world as reward for her coming to heel," which she wrote are "very real, very relevant threats" to young women. Chris Cabin of Collider argued that while Jareth represents "a kind of repressed vision of sexual desire", he also reflects a societal expectation for Sarah "to cater to a man rather than becoming more independent".

Academic John Patrick Pazdziora argued that while the obvious age gap between Sarah and Jareth may invoke the cautionary fairy tale of the Wolf and Red Riding Hood, "with its grim warnings against sexual predation", Jareth can best be understood as a father figure and mystagogue who facilitates Sarah's transformation from child to adult by appearing as an stern authority to be overcome, enabling Sarah to reject and free herself from parental oversight and her own childish fantasies. Pazdziora noted "paternal support", "deep affinity" and belief in Sarah expressed in Jareth's songs "As the World Falls Down" and "Within You", drawing comparisons to Bowie's 1971 song "Kooks" as a father's acknowledgement that his children will soon grow and live their own lives. Academic Shiloh Carroll similarly read Jareth as a dream guide because Sarah learns to defy him in order to find her way and exerts control over her own imagination by rejecting him.

== Reception ==
Although Labyrinth received mixed reviews, Jareth has earned a mostly positive reception from entertainment critics. Francie Noyes of The Arizona Republic found Jareth "a wonderful fantasy character, alternately wicked and compelling." Sheila Benson of the Los Angeles Times considered Jareth to be one of the film's strong points, writing, "he has a nice, mocking sense of irony, and he looks suitably magical with his Kabuki lion-mane hair ... He might, in fact, make a fine Shakespearean Oberon, and he'd hardly have to change costume." Paul Byrnes of The Sydney Morning Herald also likened Jareth to Oberon as a "charming tempter", although found that "his characterisation suffers because he constantly breaks into song." Mary Mae Goris of the Irish Independent wrote, "with staring hair and svelte in clinging pantaloons and high hessians [...] he'd make a good Hans Heiling if he could sing."

Jareth is often described as a pantomime villain, and a scene stealer. Considering Jareth the film's main attraction, Brian Truitt of The Palm Beach Post called him "the smoothest Goblin King of all time" and a character "[y]ou love to hate and just love to love". Taryn McCabe of Little White Lies praised Jareth as "a dazzling character we feel at once threatened by and compulsively drawn to." Hailing the character as "one of cinema's most daring and eccentric bad boys" in a feature for film website OneRoomWithAView.com, Amy Hubbard wrote: "Bowie's Jareth does exactly what he is designed to do – he is the ultimate heartthrob, a representation of danger, love and lust as well as the confusion that such feelings inspire." Adrienna Borda of Taste of Cinema wrote, "He is flirtatious and protective, yet mysterious and menacing. He is Prince Charming combined with a bad boy. Without a doubt, Jareth is simply one of the most attractive villains ever created." Nick Wanserski of The A.V. Club acclaimed Jareth as "a spectacularly realized character," while VultureHound's Jack Edwards praised him as "a wonderful villain without ever truly being evil," writing: "He has that whimsical nature of a folklore antagonist; he provides the chance for victory for the hero by giving Sarah 13 hours, he doesn't turn Toby to a goblin immediately and when he has been beat he is not destroyed, he is bound by the terms of his world." Chris Cabin of Collider found that "as a character, Jareth seems to be having infinitely more fun than most film villains do," and his creators were "careful not to stress some sadistic side or a rigid belief in evil as a kind of religious duty." Daniel Richardson of UNILAD wrote, "Oozing charisma, adding musical numbers and riffing with the comedic puppets enables the character to avoid the clichés of being a baby-snatcher. Instead, [Jareth] shows the loneliness of a king who has played a sinister game in an attempt to garner affection from someone who isn't a goblin." Hanif Willis-Abdurraqib of MTV News wrote that the Goblin King is "not a villain in the traditional sense ... he want[s] to be feared, respected, but mostly adored," concluding, "Jareth represent[s] a lot of things, perhaps the greatest being anxiety over whether we will ever be truly loved". Glamour's Ella Alexander appreciated that, unlike many male film antagonists' attitudes towards a young female protagonist, Jareth "notes the complexities and intelligence of Sarah, and is eventually defeated by her", calling it "pretty groundbreaking stuff".

Bowie's performance as Jareth was variously lauded and derided by contemporary critics. Time's Richard Corliss praised Bowie as "charismatic", while Nina Darnton wrote in The New York Times that Bowie was "perfectly cast as the teasing, tempting seducer whom Sarah must both want and reject in order to learn the labyrinth's lessons." Bruce Bailey of the Montreal Gazette also commended the casting of Bowie, commenting, "He has just the right look for a creature who's the object of both loathing and secret desire. And this is one rock star who can deliver his lines with a combination of menace and playfulness that few seasoned actors could even begin to match." However, Victoria Mather in The Daily Telegraph panned his acting as "robotic", writing, "Bowie makes himself quite ridiculous as the Goblin King complete with punk hair do and black leather, desporting himself with a small, non-speaking character in a babygro". Hal Lipper of the St. Petersburg Times found, "Bowie forgoes acting, preferring to prance around his lair while staring solemnly into the camera. He's not exactly wooden. Plastic might be a more accurate description." Variety dismissed Bowie as "too serious to be campy, too dumb to be serious." In The Straits Times, Serena Toh felt that Bowie was "too self-conscious", while Kannan Chandran was highly critical of his performance, writing, "Bowie tries to inject venom into his role but hisses like a detoxified mamba instead."

Bowie's portrayal of Jareth is acclaimed by modern critics, and received particular attention following the actor's death in 2016. The Guardian's Peter Bradshaw wrote that Bowie "made a sensational impression" as Jareth, in a role "perfect for his aptitude for fantasy and a certain kind of magical surrealism". Marc Burrows of the New Statesman wrote that Bowie "funnels his ambiguity, his magnetism and his subtle disquiet into Jareth ... The performance is hammy but somehow pitched absolutely right for the world it inhabits". Describing Bowie as "regal, arrogant and wildly charismatic", Time Out found his acting as the Goblin King "frighteningly believable". Josh Winning of Total Film wrote of his performance, "Bowie sweeps about his sumptuous castle set like a thing possessed, clearly revelling in the dress up while bringing depth and snark to the role." The Portland Press Herald wrote, "Bowie manages to be both archly hilarious, deeply menacing, and, as the symbol of the teenage heroine's awakening, very sexy."

McGovern attributed much of Labyrinth's humour to Bowie's performance, observing that his portrayal of Jareth seemed to draw upon his "penchant for spoofing his own image as a spoiled, out-of-touch rock star and willingness to poke fun at the stereotype of the pretentious, self-obsessed pop idol". Jake Wilson in The Age praised Bowie as being tactful in his portrayal, writing: "there's a camp menace to the performance, but also an unforced jollity, as if he were genuinely delighted to be surrounded by a bunch of puppets." Similarly, Bradshaw wrote that "He carries off this wacky role with absolute commitment and good humour." Empire described his performance as "fun, mischievous [...] pantomime but also scary", while The Telegraph called him "wonderfully zany". Jessica Kiang wrote for IndieWire that Bowie "brings his trademark ambiguity to making the villain both attractive and repulsive, lending the film a slightly more grown-up slant". Praising Bowie as "the indisputable star" of the film, Nick Chen of Dazed enthused that Bowie's voice "is tailor-made for a family movie villain". While judging the songs Bowie wrote and performed for Labyrinth as "far from his best work", Tasha Robinson of The A.V. Club praised Bowie's portrayal of Jareth as "gloriously iconic, a perfect blend of predatory, leering rock star and hurt, rejected emo lover". Writing for AXS, Michelle Lavallee said, "Bowie combines a theatrical flamboyance and a sinister style that makes for one of the most memorable villains of the 1980's".

== Cultural impact and legacy ==
"Every Christmas a new flock of children comes up to me and says, 'Oh! you're the one who's in Labyrinth!'"

— Bowie to an interviewer in 1992.

Despite underperforming at the U.S. box office upon initial release, Labyrinth was later a success on home video and television broadcasts, becoming a cult film. The film's lasting popularity and cult status have been attributed in large part to the character of Jareth and Bowie's performance. Jareth has been identified as a cultural icon, and is Bowie's most famous film role. Amanda Schurr of Paste wrote that Jareth "was the Wizard of Oz for Gen X moviegoers, much as the film itself sent Jim Henson-worshipping youngsters down their own uniquely '80s, glitter-flecked Yellow Brick Road." Described by Daily Telegraph writer Robert Colvile as "childhood-defining", the character is particularly popular amongst the generation of children from the 1980s and 1990s. Bowie told an interviewer in 2002, "There's a generation that kind of know about Labyrinth ... A lot of kids are brought up to me and their mums say, 'This is Jareth, from Labyrinth!'". Journalist Rob Sheffield described Labyrinth as "the gateway drug that keeps introducing [Bowie] to new generations of young fans."

Jareth is Bowie's most fondly remembered performance as well as his most "rock-star" acting role, academic Andrew Ross wrote in The Conversation. According to The Telegraph's Ed Power, Labyrinth led to a "mythologising" of Bowie. Burrows argued that Jareth is the most important character Bowie played in his career because it cemented his legacy as "one of ethereal weirdness", in contrast to the more conventional entertainer he had become by the 1980s. Paul Morley in The Guardian identified Labyrinth as "the most blatant example of how Bowie could be both an amiable family entertainer and a far-fetched experimental pop star." Lucas Fagen of Hyperallergic considered Jareth to be Bowie's "absolute triumph as an actor", more so than his roles in the films The Man Who Fell to Earth (1975) and The Hunger (1983).

Jareth is regarded as one of the most iconic characters featured in a fantasy film. Pop culture website The Portalist rated Jareth as one of 50 "Best Fantasy Characters Ever", stating that "his fashion sense, musical abilities, and magnetism make Jareth one of the most iconic characters to come out of the dark fantasy films of the '80s." Total Film included Jareth on a similar list of 50 greatest fantasy characters, and wrote that "Not only can he hold a damn fine tune ... he's also one of the biggest fantasy divas ever" and "knows how to make an entrance". The same publication also ranked Jareth as one of 30 greatest film characters from the 1980s. Screen Rant listed Jareth among the 10 most iconic characters created by Jim Henson, writing that while the villain of Labyrinth, "he's so likable and fun it's impossible not to fall under his spell." The website also rated Jareth among the "10 Coolest Villains In Movie History".

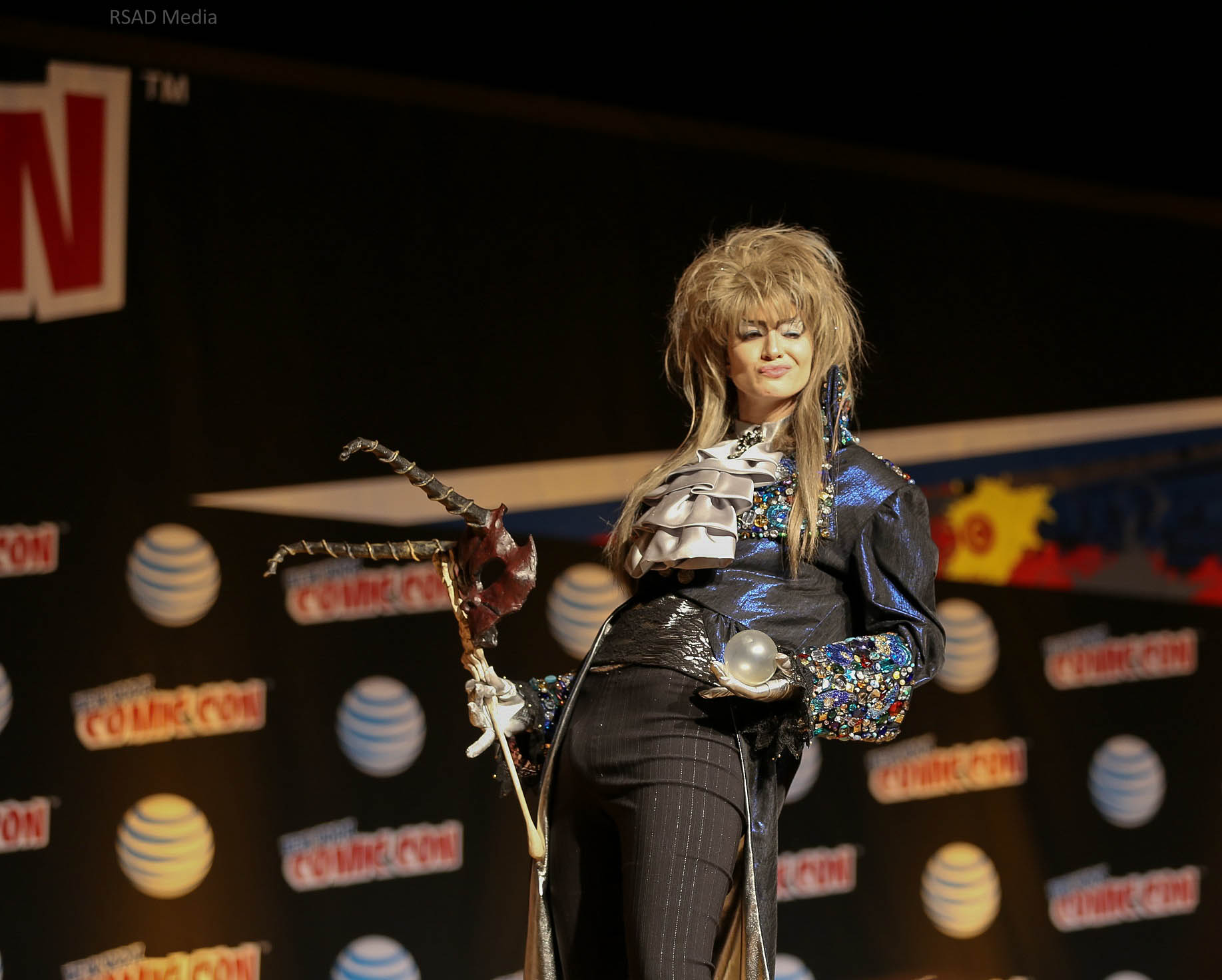
A cosplayer dressed as Jareth at the 2015 New York Comic Con

The character has gained recognition for his looks and fashion, with ShortList ranking him among the "25 Best Dressed Villains" on film. Dazed and Vogue listed Jareth among Bowie's most stylish movie roles, the latter writing that "there's no taking your eyes off of [Jareth] and his over-the-top costumes [...] he's easily the most fashion-forward Jim Henson creation." In an article listing the "best mullets in movie history", Digital Spy called Jareth's hairstyle the most "magnificent mullet on the silver screen", while Into Film wrote it is "one of the most remarkable wigs in movie history". Ranking it among the "Top 10 Iconic Hairstyles In Pop Culture History", Pedestrian dubbed the hairstyle "The Jareth" and called it the "pinnacle of late 80s hair appeal". Time Out, however, considered it "Bowie's saddest ever haircut". When asked in 2002 to nominate the most "Spinal Tap" fashion moment of his career, Bowie joked that his Labyrinth wardrobe "got pretty damn near it". Rotten Tomatoes considered Jareth among the "Top 10 Most Outrageous Movie Characters", citing among other attributes his "fantastically loud glam-rock" hairstyle and "melodramatic" singing. A sex symbol, Jareth has been credited by several publications with initiating the sexual awakening of numerous women as young girls and teenagers during the 1980s and 1990s.

Jareth is a popular subject of fan art, cosplay and fan fiction, in which he is often paired with (the adult) Sarah, though not always romantically. Jim Henson went dressed as Jareth to one of the annual masked costume parties he hosted in New York between 1983 and 1988. Since 1997, the Labyrinth of Jareth Masquerade Ball, an event inspired by the character and film, has been held annually in various US cities, including San Diego, Hollywood, and, most recently, Los Angeles. According to event founder Shawn Strider, in the mythology that has developed around the ball, Jareth is a legendary "faerie prince or a goblin prince" who, due to a broken heart, eventually left the Labyrinth to be reunited with Sarah. Labyrinth has also inspired a number of fantasy novelists to create characters modelled on Jareth, often as antagonists or love interests to female protagonists in similarly themed fantasy worlds.

Props and costumes Bowie wore as Jareth have been showcased in numerous exhibitions, including: the Museum of Pop Culture's permanent installation Fantasy: Worlds of Myth and Magic (opened 2013), the Victoria and Albert Museum's touring exhibit David Bowie Is (2013–2018), the Center for Puppetry Arts' display Jim Henson's Labyrinth: Journey to Goblin City (2016–2017), and the Museum of the Moving Image's permanent feature The Jim Henson Exhibition: Imagination Unlimited (opened 2017).

== Other appearances ==
Jareth appears in Labyrinth's tie-in adaptations, which include the novelisation by A. C. H. Smith and the three-issue comic book adaptation published by Marvel Comics, which was first released in a single volume as Marvel Super Special #40 in 1986. He also appears in the film's picture book adaptation, photo album, and Labyrinth: The Computer Game.

=== Novelisation ===
The Labyrinth novelisation includes a thematic subplot that was left out of the film, in which Sarah's mother had left her father to become an actress and had become romantically involved with an actor. According to Henson, the actor was to be played by Bowie in the film, so when Jareth appeared in his likeness "[Sarah] was to feel this attraction to him, but also anger". The subplot was ultimately cut from the script as "it loaded the story down". However, in the film various photos are briefly shown in Sarah's room depicting the unnamed actor (Bowie) with Sarah's mother Linda Williams, alongside news clippings reporting their "on/off relationship". In the novelisation, Linda's costar is named Jeremy. The novelisation elaborates on Sarah aspiring to become an actress like her mother, idolizing both Linda and Jeremy, and fantasising about living their celebrity lifestyle.

=== Music videos ===
Bowie portrayed Jareth in two music videos for the songs "Underground" and "As the World Falls Down" from the Labyrinth soundtrack. Produced by Steve Barron in 1986, both videos were released on the 1993 VHS tape Bowie – The Video Collection and the 2002 two-disc DVD set Best of Bowie. The videos feature footage of Bowie (as himself) performing the songs, appearances by various Labyrinth puppet characters, and footage of Bowie as the Goblin King taken from the film.

=== Spin-off comics ===
==== Return to Labyrinth ====
Jareth appears as one of the main characters in Return to Labyrinth, a four-volume original English-language manga sequel to the film created by Jake T. Forbes and published by Tokyopop between 2006 and 2010. In the manga, Jareth has been the Goblin King for 1,300 years, and is not a goblin like his subjects but had decided to rule them out of boredom. Having created the Labyrinth to isolate himself and protect his heart, Jareth is weakened by Sarah's defeat and his powers have diminished. In the series, which is set more than a decade after the events of the film, Jareth abdicates his throne, establishing the now teenaged Toby as his heir and leaving him in charge of the Labyrinth, which is in a deteriorating state. Jareth then goes to the human world to entice Sarah, with whom he is still in love, into creating a new world with him using the power of her dreams. However, Sarah realises her dreams and finds a way to preserve the world of the Labyrinth by writing stories. After Sarah and Toby insist everyone be allowed to choose their own paths, Jareth finds himself unwillingly returned to the goblin throne.

==== Unreleased graphic novel ====
Archaia Entertainment, in collaboration with The Jim Henson Company, announced in 2011 it was developing a prequel graphic novel about the story of how Jareth became the Goblin King. Project editor Stephen Christy described the graphic novel as "a very tragic story" featuring a teenaged Jareth, and not featuring Sarah or Toby. David Bowie was approached by Archaia in order to seek permission to use his likeness, and ascertain if he wished to have any involvement in the project. As a creative consultant on the project, Brian Froud was involved in producing character designs. Reported to feature a young Jareth who is taken into the Labyrinth by a witch, the novel's official synopsis states the plot revolves around Jareth's "attempt to rescue his true love from the clutches of the wicked and beautiful Goblin Queen."

==== Labyrinth: Coronation ====
Jareth is the central character in Labyrinth: Coronation, a 12-issue comic series published between 2018 and 2019 by Archaia which gives an account of the Goblin King's past as well as the history of the Labyrinth itself. Written by Simon Spurrier, the series takes place within the timeline of the events of the film, framed as a story told to baby Toby by Jareth during their off-screen time together. Beginning in 1790s Venice, the story revolves around an infant Jareth who has been stolen by the previous ruler of the Labyrinth, known as the Owl King, and follows the quest of Jareth's mother, Maria, to rescue her son. Spurrier has mentioned that this comic is not canon to the movie, that it was only inspired by the movie and therefore just his artistic interpretation.

==== Short stories ====
Jareth appears in several comic short stories set in the world of Labyrinth published by Archaia. He appears in the Labyrinth 2017 Special, a collection of six short stories by multiple authors, mainly featuring in the fifth story, Beauty or the Beast by Roger Langridge, in which he shows the captive baby Toby some of the wonders of his kingdom and informs Toby that he will inherit it someday. Jareth appears in Labyrinth: Under the Spell, a 2018 collection of three comic short stories describing some of the individual histories of his subjects. Jareth has a minor appearance in Labyrinth: Masquerade, a 2020 one-shot story about the ballgoers in Sarah's masquerade dream.

=== Merchandise ===
Jareth features prominently in Labyrinth merchandise such as colouring and activity books, posters, lobby cards, jigsaw puzzles and school and party supplies. Over the years since the film's release, the character has also been produced and marketed as licensed action figures and figurines.

In 2005, Palisades Toys announced a series of 12-inch collectible action figures based on Labyrinth. The first in the series was called the Jareth Classic, dressed in his "signature" outfit of Regency shirt, breeches and riding boots. However, the company went bankrupt in 2006 and the figure's release that year was cancelled. Plan B Toys released a resin bust of Jareth in 2006, set atop a crystal ball. The prototype display also included a version in his armour and cape. As part of its Cult Classics range, NECA released three Jareth action figures: a 12-inch speaking doll dressed in black and a 7-inch non-speaking version in 2007, followed by a differently garbed 7-inch figure in 2008 which also came with a figure of Hoggle the dwarf. A collectible Jareth statue was produced by KnuckleBonz as part of The Jim Henson Company's efforts to promote Labyrinth for its 25th anniversary in 2011, but ultimately never released.

Two different Funko Pop figurines of Jareth were released in 2016, and a third "glitter version" in 2017. McFarlane Toys in 2017 released a 7-inch action figure, in his Ballroom dream outfit with a mask and a crystal orb, followed by another 7-inch figure in 2019, in his "Dance Magic" outfit with his sceptre and a miniature goblin. Chronicle Collectibles released a 1:4 scale polyresin statue of Jareth on his throne in 2019, and the same year, Ikon Collectables released a 1:6 scale (34 cm) resin statue of Jareth in his feathered cloak, holding out a crystal, as in his final scene in the film. Weta Workshop produced a vinyl figurine of Jareth as a part of its Mini Epics line in 2021. In 2023, pop culture product maker Plastic Meatball released a 3.75″ scale action figure of Jareth in his Throne Room ("Magic Dance") outfit.
