= Club Bowie =

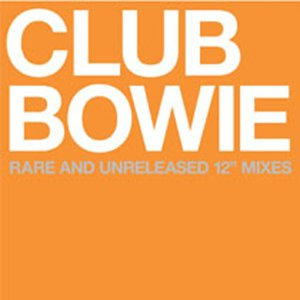

Remix album by David Bowie
- Released: 2 December 2003
- Recorded: 1977–1985
- Genre: Dance, house music, EDM
- Length: 65:57
- Label: Virgin/EMI Records; 7243 5 96758 2 4 V2-96758

David Bowie chronology
Reality (2003)	Club Bowie (2003)	The Collection (2005)

David Bowie compilation chronology
Best of Bowie (2002)	Club Bowie (2003)	The Collection (2005)

Professional ratings
Review scores
Source	Rating
Allmusic	1.5/5 stars
The Encyclopedia of Popular Music	2/5 stars

Club Bowie is a 2003 compilation of material by David Bowie. It includes non-contemporary club mixes of Bowie hits, despite the "rare and unreleased" claim on the cover.

== Track listing ==
1. "Loving the Alien" - (The Scumfrog vs. David Bowie) (David Bowie) – 8:21
2. "Let's Dance" - (Trifactor vs. Deeper Substance remix) (Bowie) – 11:02
3. "Just for One Day" (""Heroes"") - (David Guetta vs. Bowie) (Bowie, Brian Eno, David Guetta) – 6:37
4. "This Is Not America" - (The Scumfrog vs. David Bowie) (Bowie, Lyle Mays, Pat Metheny) – 9:12
5. "Shout" ("Fashion") - (Solaris vs. Bowie) (Bowie) – 8:02
6. "China Girl" - (Riff & Vox Club mix) (Bowie, Iggy Pop) – 7:08
7. "Magic Dance" (Danny S Magic Party remix) (Bowie) – 7:39
8. "Let's Dance" - (Club Bolly extended mix) (Bowie, Anita Kaur, Navin Kumar Singh) – 7:56
9. "Let's Dance" - (Club Bolly mix) (Video) (Bowie, Kaur, Singh) – 3:52
  - Enhanced Video

== Personnel ==
- Tim Binns – Project Coordinator
- Karen Cai – Video Director
- Deeper Substance – Remixing
- Ben Galvin – Remixing
- Shawn Letts – Remixing
- The Scumfrog – Remixing
- Daniel Shepherd – Programming, Producer
- Kelvin Singh – Remixing
- Solaris – Producer, Remixing
- Trifactor – Remixing
- Henry Wrenn Meleck – Project Coordinator
