= As the World Falls Down =

Song by David Bowie

from the album Labyrinth
- Released: 23 June 1986
- Recorded: June–July 1985
- Length: 4:50 (album version); 3:40 (edit)
- Label: EMI
- Songwriter: David Bowie
- Producers: David Bowie; Arif Mardin

Music video
- "As the World Falls Down" on YouTube

"As the World Falls Down" is a song written by David Bowie for the soundtrack of the 1986 fantasy film Labyrinth.

== Background and composition ==
"As the World Falls Down" is one of five songs Bowie wrote and recorded for the film, in which he also starred as Jareth, the king of the goblins. A love ballad, "As the World Falls Down" was written for a dream sequence in which Jareth and the film's heroine, Sarah, dance at a fantastic masquerade ball. Bowie said of the song, "[Director] Jim Henson wanted something which was fairly old-fashioned in its sentiments and it is, for me, the prettiest tune in the movie, and the most relaxed." The song's melody is heard at the start of the film as the tune played by Sarah's music box.

"As the World Falls Down" is structured in the traditional I–vi–IV–V form popular in 1950s ballads. The song's intro is in a moderately fast 3/4 time, before an electric bass modifies the rhythm to a slower 4/4 time. The bass line consists of a constant rising musical motif that acts as a hook throughout the song. There is a minor fourth, and later a minor second in the chorus.

== Release and promotion ==
"As the World Falls Down" is the seventh track on the Labyrinth soundtrack, which was released in July 1986 to coincide with the film's U.S. premiere.

Hoggle in the foreground with Bowie, out of focus, in the background, in a still from the official video for the song

EMI planned to also release the song as a single in late 1986, and as a result, a 3:40 edit was produced along with a promotional music video, directed by Steve Barron. The video splices clips from Labyrinth with monochrome footage of Bowie performing the song in an elegant room accompanied by the character Hoggle from the film. The storyline follows photocopies of Bowie enchanting a woman in an office building, portrayed by French actress Charlotte Valandrey. Barron's videos for "As the World Falls Down" and the Labyrinth theme song "Underground" so impressed Jim Henson that he recruited Barron to direct his television series The Storyteller.

However, the single's release and video were cancelled — perhaps because Bowie did not want the love ballad to lessen the impact of his upcoming harder-sounding release Never Let Me Down, biographer Nicholas Pegg suggested. The video was eventually included on Bowie – The Video Collection (1993) and on the DVD version of Best of Bowie (2002).

The album-version of the song was included as a bonus track on the Virgin Records re-release of Tonight in 1995. In 2001, it was included on the 5-track CD I Am Iman, personally compiled by Bowie as a promotional device packaged with initial copies of his wife Iman's 2001 autobiography of the same name.

== Reception ==
Rolling Stone called the song a "hidden gem" of Bowie's career and included "As the World Falls Down" on its list of 30 essential Bowie songs, describing it as a "sparkling, subdued ballad...which intermingles a tender vocal performance from Bowie and a sinewy bass line with glassy New Romantic synths". The A.V. Club considered it the best song from Labyrinth, and wrote that it "cater[s] in heartfelt empathy, using classic pop chord progressions to relate the joys and pain of love." Smooth Radio chose "As the World Falls Down" as number 11 on its ranking of Bowie's 20 greatest songs, and argued that it "deserves to be considered amongst Bowie's finest ever songs". Newsweek deemed the song "pure 80s cheese", conceding that "it does have a lovely chorus" however. Gigwise named the song as one of "the 50 best ever original songs made for movies".

According to Bowie biographer David Buckley in 2015, "As the World Falls Down" was in the top 30 highest-selling Bowie songs on iTunes in the United Kingdom, and the Labyrinth soundtrack was Bowie's third-best selling iTunes album. At the time of Bowie's death in 2016, the song was the 32nd highest-selling Bowie UK download.

== Personnel ==
Credits per biographer Chris O'Leary:

- David Bowie – vocals, backing vocals, producer
- Arif Mardin – producer
- Nicky Moroch – lead guitar
- Jeff Mironov – lead and rhythm guitar
- Will Lee – bass
- Steve Ferrone – drums
- Robbie Buchanan – keyboards, synthesiser, programming, guitars, arranger
- Robin Beck – backing vocals
