= Spirit guide =

Concept in Western spiritualism

A spirit guide, in spiritualism, is an entity that remains as a discarnate spirit to act as a guide or protector to a living incarnated individual.

== Description ==
In some traditional West African belief systems, well before the spread of Christianity and Islam, those African peoples believed and continue to believe in the eternal and ubiquitous spirit of the ancestors and the supreme deity. The ancestors are thought of as the ‘living-dead’, who continue to show a compassionate interest in the daily lives of their living descendants. Ancestor spirit guides are superior to the living and may include deceased parents, grandparents, great-grandparents, uncles or aunts. It is believed that because they have crossed over to the other side of life, the spirit guides act as mediators between the living and the supreme deity. This way of life is regarded as ancestor reverence, communication or remembering, and not as ancestor worship per se.

According to Western theosophical doctrine, spirit guides are not always of human descent. Some spirit guides live as energy, in the cosmic realm, or as light beings, which are very high level spirit guides. Some spirit guides are persons who have lived many former lifetimes, paid their karmic debts, and advanced beyond a need to reincarnate. Many devotees believe that spirit guides are chosen on "the other side" by those who are about to incarnate and wish assistance.

Some early modern Spiritualists did not favor the idea of spirit guides. Spiritualist author and medium E.W. Wallis, writing in A Guide to Mediumship and Psychic Unfoldment, expressed the opinion that the notion of spirit guides is disempowering and disrespectful to both spirits and living people. Although he does not deny that seeking people may be helped by spirits here and there, he decries the idea that said spirits are appointed or assigned to do nothing but help the living. He advises would-be mediums to steer clear of the notion that they are being "guided" unless they have demonstrable proof that such is the case.

== Firsthand accounts ==
Theresa Caputo, the Long Island-based, Pigasus Award-winning "medium" of the reality TV series Long Island Medium, simply calls her guide "Spirit", claiming that it is an entity that she has been able to sense since she was four years old.

American Spiritualists of the 19th and 20th centuries often described their guides as resembling Native Americans. One popular spirit guide of this type, encountered by many Anglo-American Spiritualists, was named White Hawk. Among African-American Spiritualists, especially those in churches that were founded by or influenced by Mother Leafy Anderson, the Native American guide was named Black Hawk, and was presumed to be the spirit of the Sac tribe warrior of the same name.

== See also ==
- Channeler
- Dream guide
- Traditional African religions
- Spiritualism
- Guardian angel
