= Underground (David Bowie song) =

Song by David Bowie

Single by David Bowie

from the album Labyrinth
- B-side: "Underground (Instrumental)"
- Released: 9 June 1986
- Recorded: 1985
- Genre: Pop; gospel
- Length: 5:57 (album version); 4:25 (edited version)
- Label: EMI
- Songwriter: David Bowie
- Producers: David Bowie; Arif Mardin

David Bowie singles chronology
"Absolute Beginners" (1986)	"Underground" (1986)	"When the Wind Blows" (1986)

7" Picture Disc Cover
- EAP 216 (UK)

Music video
- "Underground" on YouTube

"Underground" is a song written and recorded by David Bowie for the soundtrack of the 1986 film Labyrinth. It reached No. 21 on the UK singles chart.

== Details and background ==
Bowie wrote and recorded five songs for Labyrinth, in which he also starred as Jareth, the king of the goblins. "Underground" is the film's theme song; a slower, re-scored version by composer Trevor Jones plays over the opening credits whilst Bowie's original version plays during the end credits. Explaining his choice of musical style for the song, Bowie said: "The film essentially deals with a girl's emotions and what she's going through, discovering about herself and her parents and her relationship to her family. So I wanted something very emotional, and for me the most emotional music I can think of is gospel."

Bowie and producer Arif Mardin recorded "Underground" at Atlantic Studios in New York. The track included a large chorus of backing vocalists including Chaka Khan, Luther Vandross and Daphne Rubin-Vega, along with the Radio Choir of the New Hope Baptist Church.

Lead guitar was played by blues guitarist Albert Collins, whose contribution to the song was described by Bowie as "a very savage, rough, aggressive sound which goes against some of the maybe superficial slickness of the synthesizers."

== Video ==
Steve Barron directed the promotional video clip for the song, which was filmed at Shepperton Studios over several days in February 1986. The video portrays Bowie as a nightclub singer who walks into an ominous alleyway where he encounters various puppet creatures from Labyrinth, including characters such as Hoggle and the Junk Lady. Bowie turns into a cartoon figure, stepping into an animated underground world. Before his descent there is a brief montage of numerous past images of Bowie, including musical personae from Ziggy Stardust to Jazzin' for Blue Jean and his film characters from The Man Who Fell to Earth and The Hunger.

Labyrinth director Jim Henson was impressed enough with Barron's style to offer him a job directing the pilot episode of The Storyteller. Though Bowie was not heavily involved in promoting the film, Henson was nonetheless grateful for the "Underground" video, saying, "I think it's the best thing he could have done for the film." Bowie was not happy with the video, saying in 1987, "I've found that the videos I put into other people’s hands have always been a mistake. Because of my lack of interest, I didn't get that involved with things like 'Underground' which I did for Labyrinth. I just left it up, and the result is just not my kind of video. I was a bit lax there. I didn't feel involved." Despite Bowie's dislike for the video, Entertainment Weekly and Esquire considered it to be among his best after he died in 2016.

According to Screen Rant, the video can be interpreted as "background and lore to Bowie's character" Jareth, showing an origin story "of how he was an ordinary man that wandered into the Underground (the world of Labyrinth), and became the Goblin King."

== Reception ==
Sean Stangland of the Daily Herald described "Underground" as a "pop ballad that climaxes in a gospel celebration." Similarly describing the song as "a joyous rave-up that starts out as synth-pop before transitioning to a gospel barnstormer", David Brusie of The A.V. Club noted that it had a similar production style to Bowie's 1983 Motown-influenced song "Modern Love". Brusie also wrote that "Underground" is "distinctly American-sounding, making for a striking ending" to Labyrinth, as the film's story is "steeped in European influences like Alice In Wonderland and Grimm’s fairy tales."

Smooth Radio chose "Underground" as number 15 on its ranking of Bowie's 20 greatest songs. Newsweek considered it the strongest song on the Labyrinth soundtrack, a view shared by Screen Rant, which considered "Underground" as one of "the 10 best movie theme songs from the 80s".

== Follow-up singles ==
"As the World Falls Down" was considered for a Christmas 1986 single release, but was canceled. "Magic Dance" was released as the second single from the soundtrack to limited countries in January 1987.

== Track listing ==
All tracks by Bowie.

=== 7" commercial single/12" promo single: EMI / EA 216 (UK) ===
1. "Underground" (edited version) – 4:25
2. "Underground" (instrumental; with chorus) – 5:40

=== 12" club single: EMI / 12EA 216 (UK) ===
1. "Underground" (extended dance mix) – 7:51
2. "Underground" (dub) – 5:59
3. "Underground" (instrumental) – 5:54

=== 7" picture disc: EMI / EAP 216 (UK) ===
1. "Underground" (edited version) – 4:25
2. "Underground" (instrumental) – 5:54

=== Download: EMI / iEA 216 (UK) ===
1. "Underground" (edited version) – 4:25
2. "Underground" (extended dance mix) – 7:51
3. "Underground" (instrumental of album version) – 5:54
4. "Underground" (dub) – 5:59

== Personnel ==
Credits adapted from the liner notes of Underground.

- David Bowie – vocals, backing vocals
- Albert Collins – lead guitar
- Nicky Moroch – rhythm guitar
- Richard Tee – piano and Hammond B-3 organ
- Steve Ferrone – drum effects
- Robbie Buchanan – keyboards, synthesizer
- Bob Gay – alto saxophone
- Garcia Alston – background vocals
- Mary Davis Canty – background vocals
- Beverly Ferguson – background vocals
- A. Marie Foster – background vocals
- James Glenn – background vocals
- Cissy Houston – background vocals
- Chaka Khan – background vocals
- Marcus Miller – background vocals
- Eunice Peterson – background vocals
- Daphne Rubin-Vega – background vocals
- Rennele Stafford – background vocals
- Marcus Stephens – background vocals
- Fonzi Thornton – background vocals
- Luther Vandross – background vocals

Technical

- David Bowie – producer, arrangement
- Arif Mardin – producer, arrangement
- Robbie Buchanan – programming, arrangement
- Andy Thomas – additional programming
- Eddie Garcia – assisting engineer
- Jeremy Smith – mixing
- Michael O'Reilly – recording
- Steve Thompson – production, remix on the "Extended Dance Mix"
- Michael Barbiero – production, remix on the "Extended Dance Mix"

== Charts ==
=== Weekly charts ===
Chart (1986)	Peak position
Australia (Kent Music Report)	26
Belgium (Ultratop 50 Flanders)	10
Canadian Singles (RPM)	73
Finland (Suomen virallinen lista)	7
France (IFOP)	78
Netherlands (Dutch Top 40)	6
Netherlands (Single Top 100)	7
Ireland (IRMA)	6
New Zealand (Recorded Music NZ)	6
Spain (AFYVE)	11
Sweden (Sverigetopplistan)	19
Switzerland (Schweizer Hitparade)	14
UK Singles (Official Charts)	21
US Dance Club Songs (Billboard)	22
US Mainstream Rock (Billboard)	18
West Germany (GfK)	20

=== Year-end charts ===
Chart (1986)	Position
Belgium (Ultratop Flanders)	90
Netherlands (Dutch Top 40)	79

== Bibliography ==
- Block, Paula; Erdmann, Terry (2016). Labyrinth: The Ultimate Visual History. Insight Editions. ISBN 978-1-60887-810-9.
- Clerc, Benoît (2021). David Bowie All the Songs: The Story Behind Every Track. New York City: Black Dog & Leventhal. ISBN 978-0-7624-7471-4.
- Palmer, Landon (2020). Rock Star/Movie Star: Power and Performance in Cinematic Rock Stardom. Oxford University Press. ISBN 978-0-19-088840-4.
- Pegg, Nicholas (2016). The Complete David Bowie (7th ed.). London, United Kingdom: Titan Books Ltd. ISBN 978-1-78565-365-0.
