= The Collection (David Bowie album) =

Compilation album by David Bowie
- Released: 3 May 2005
- Recorded: 1969–1980
- Genre: Rock
- Length: 57:27
- Label: EMI/Virgin

David Bowie chronology
Club Bowie (2003)	The Collection (2005)	The Platinum Collection (2005)

David Bowie compilation chronology
Club Bowie (2003)	The Collection (2005)	The Best of David Bowie 1980/1987 (2007)

Professional ratings
Review scores
Source	Rating
AllMusic	3/5 stars

The Collection is a 2005 compilation album by English singer-songwriter David Bowie. It contains one song from every studio album Bowie released from David Bowie (1969) to Scary Monsters (And Super Creeps) (1980) with the exclusion of the covers album Pin Ups (1973). This compilation omits the hits and focuses on lesser known album tracks.

== Track listing ==
All songs written by David Bowie.

1. "Unwashed and Somewhat Slightly Dazed" (from David Bowie, 1969) – 6:15
2. "The Width of a Circle" (from The Man Who Sold the World, 1970) – 8:07
3. "Andy Warhol" (from Hunky Dory, 1971) – 3:47
4. "Soul Love" (from The Rise and Fall of Ziggy Stardust and the Spiders from Mars, 1972) – 3:36
5. "Cracked Actor" (from Aladdin Sane, 1973) – 2:58
6. "Sweet Thing" (from Diamond Dogs, 1974) – 3:40
7. "Somebody Up There Likes Me" (from Young Americans, 1975) – 6:31
8. "Word on a Wing" (from Station to Station, 1976) – 6:02
9. "Always Crashing in the Same Car" (from Low, 1977) – 3:31
10. "Beauty and the Beast" (from "Heroes", 1977) – 3:37
11. "Repetition" (from Lodger, 1979) – 3:01
12. "Teenage Wildlife" (from Scary Monsters (And Super Creeps), 1980) – 6:55
