= Best of Bowie =

2002 greatest hits album by David Bowie

Greatest hits album by David Bowie
- Released: 22 October 2002
- Recorded: 1969–2002
- Genre: Rock
- Length: 156:20 (UK version); Varies from region to region
- Labels: EMI; Virgin
- Producer: Producer varies from track to track

David Bowie chronology
| Heathen (2002) | Best of Bowie (2002) | Reality (2003) |

David Bowie compilation chronology
| All Saints (2001) | Best of Bowie (2002) | Club Bowie (2003) |

Professional ratings
Review scores
| Source | Rating |
|---|---|
| AllMusic | 4.5/5 stars |
| Blender | 5/5 stars |
| The Encyclopedia of Popular Music | 4/5 stars |

Best of Bowie is a greatest hits album by English recording artist David Bowie. Released in October 2002, four months after the critical and commercial success of the Heathen album, the songs range from his second album, David Bowie (1969), to Heathen (2002). A DVD, also titled Best of Bowie, was released in conjunction with the album.

Initially peaking at number 11 on the UK Albums Chart upon release in October 2002, the album entered the top 10 for the first time in January 2016, after Bowie's death, and reached a new peak of number 1, marking his eleventh UK number 1 album. It also became the first album to reach number 1 in the UK due to streaming. Best of Bowie has been certified 4× Platinum by the British Phonographic Industry for sales of over 1,200,000.

== CD release ==
In each of the 21 territories that Best of Bowie was released, it was given its own track listing, based upon which songs were most popular in that region. In some countries, two versions were available – single-disc and double-disc versions. In all, 63 tracks appear in at least one of the different releases. The country the edition came from can be identified by a small national flag on the spine, except for the Argentine/Mexican, Eastern European and UK editions, which are "flag-less". Some regions included rare versions of some songs, such as the New Zealand version, which included a previously unreleased 4:01 edit of "Magic Dance" (1986) (mis-labeled as the 'single version'), and the Chilean edition which included the first-ever CD release of the single version of "Underground" (1986).

== DVD release ==
Effectively an updated and expanded DVD version of the 1993 home video Bowie – The Video Collection, the Best of Bowie double DVD set was, at the time, described as the "most extensive collection of Bowie videos yet released." Videos were restored and remastered at Abbey Road Interactive. The DVD also included extensive easter eggs including live, remixed and alternate versions of some songs, hidden by navigating the DVD in specific ways.

The videos for "China Girl", "Loving the Alien", "Day-In Day-Out", and "The Hearts Filthy Lesson" are the censored versions of the original videos.

== 2003 and 2004 re-releases ==
In November 2003, the US/Canada single-disc version was re-released to include a new bonus DVD which included new audio and video remixes from Club Bowie (2003). In 2004, to coincide with Bowie's A Reality Tour reaching the Far East, an "Asian Tour Edition" was released that combined the original UK release with the bonus DVD as well.

== Chart performance ==
Initially peaking at number 11 in October 2002 on the UK Albums Chart, the album entered the top 10 for the first time in January 2016, following Bowie's death. On 5 February, after his final album Blackstar had spent three weeks at the top, Best of Bowie reached a new peak of number 1, marking Bowie's eleventh UK number 1 album and making him the first artist to replace themselves at number 1 with a different album since Michael Jackson did it after his own death in 2009. It also became the first album to reach number 1 in the UK on streams alone.

== Track listings ==
All tracks written by David Bowie except as noted.
Track listings note: The first unique track reference contains all information pertaining to that song and version, including song writing credits, source and length. Subsequent references only mention song and version unless where noted.

=== UK and rest of Europe except Belgium, Germany, Switzerland, Austria, and Denmark (2 CD) ===
CD: EMI / 5 39821 2 (UK) // EMI 7243 5 39821 2 6 (Europe)

CD 1

| No. | Title | Writer(s) | Place of Origin | Length |
|---|---|---|---|---|
| 1. | "Space Oddity" | | David Bowie, 1969 | 5:15 |
| 2. | "The Man Who Sold the World" | | The Man Who Sold the World, 1970/1971 | 3:55 |
| 3. | "Oh! You Pretty Things" | | Hunky Dory, 1971 | 3:12 |
| 4. | "Changes" | | Hunky Dory | 3:33 |
| 5. | "Life on Mars?" | | Hunky Dory | 3:48 |
| 6. | "Starman" | | The Rise and Fall of Ziggy Stardust and the Spiders from Mars, 1972; released as a single before the parent album's release | 4:16 |
| 7. | "Ziggy Stardust" | | The Rise and Fall of Ziggy Stardust and the Spiders from Mars | 3:13 |
| 8. | "Suffragette City" | | The Rise and Fall of Ziggy Stardust and the Spiders from Mars | 3:25 |
| 9. | "John, I'm Only Dancing" | | Non-album single, 1972 | 2:43 |
| 10. | "The Jean Genie" | | Aladdin Sane, 1973; released as a single the previous year | 4:08 |
| 11. | "Drive-In Saturday" | | Aladdin Sane | 4:36 |
| 12. | "Sorrow" | Bob Feldman, Jerry Goldstein, Richard Gottehrer | Pin Ups, 1973; originally by The McCoys and made famous by The Merseys, 1965/1966 | 2:53 |
| 13. | "Diamond Dogs" | | Diamond Dogs, 1974 | 6:05 |
| 14. | "Rebel Rebel" | | Diamond Dogs | 4:30 |
| 15. | "Young Americans" (United States single version) | | Young Americans, 1975 | 3:16 |
| 16. | "Fame" | Bowie, Carlos Alomar, John Lennon | Young Americans | 4:17 |
| 17. | "Golden Years" (single version) | | Station to Station, 1976; single version released the previous year | 3:22 |
| 18. | "TVC 15" | | Station to Station | 5:33 |
| 19. | "Wild Is the Wind" | Dimitri Tiomkin, Ned Washington | Station to Station; originally done by Johnny Mathis for the film of the same name, 1957 | 6:02 |

CD 2

| No. | Title | Writer(s) | Place of Origin | Length |
|---|---|---|---|---|
| 1. | "Sound and Vision" | | Low, 1977 | 3:00 |
| 2. | ""Heroes"" (single version) | Bowie, Brian Eno | "Heroes", 1977 | 3:37 |
| 3. | "Boys Keep Swinging" | Bowie, Eno | Lodger, 1979 | 3:18 |
| 4. | "Under Pressure" (with Queen; Greatest Hits II edit) | Bowie, Freddie Mercury, Brian May, John Deacon, Roger Taylor | Non-album single, 1981; later included on the Queen album Hot Space, 1982 | 3:56 |
| 5. | "Ashes to Ashes" (single version) | | Scary Monsters (And Super Creeps), 1980 | 3:38 |
| 6. | "Fashion" (single version) | | Scary Monsters (And Super Creeps) | 3:23 |
| 7. | "Scary Monsters (And Super Creeps)" (single version) | | Scary Monsters (And Super Creeps); released as a single the following year | 3:27 |
| 8. | "Let's Dance" (single version) | | Let's Dance, 1983 | 4:07 |
| 9. | "China Girl" (single version) | Bowie, Jim Osterberg (a.k.a. Iggy Pop) | Originally by Iggy Pop from The Idiot, 1977; later covered for Let's Dance | 4:18 |
| 10. | "Modern Love" (single version) | | Let's Dance | 3:56 |
| 11. | "Blue Jean" | | Tonight, 1984 | 3:12 |
| 12. | "This Is Not America" (with the Pat Metheny Group) | Bowie, Lyle Mays, Pat Metheny | The Falcon and the Snowman soundtrack, 1985 | 3:43 |
| 13. | "Loving the Alien" (single remix) | | Tonight; remixed and released as a single the following year | 4:43 |
| 14. | "Dancing in the Street" (with Mick Jagger) | Marvin Gaye, William "Mickey" Stevenson, Ivy Jo Hunter | Non-album single for Live Aid, 1985; originally by Martha and the Vandellas from Dance Party | 3:14 |
| 15. | "Absolute Beginners" (single version) | | Absolute Beginners soundtrack, 1986 | 5:39 |
| 16. | "Jump They Say" (radio edit) | | Black Tie White Noise, 1993 | 3:53 |
| 17. | "Hallo Spaceboy" (Pet Shop Boys mix; with the Pet Shop Boys) | Bowie, Eno | 1. Outside, 1995; PSB mix released as a single the following year | 4:25 |
| 18. | "Little Wonder" (single version) | Bowie, Reeves Gabrels, Mark Plati | Earthling, 1997 | 3:40 |
| 19. | "I'm Afraid of Americans" (V1 radio edit) | Bowie, Eno | Original version found on Earthling | 4:26 |
| 20. | "Slow Burn" (radio edit) | | Heathen, 2002 | 3:55 |

=== US and Canada (1 CD Version) ===
CD: Virgin-EMI / 5 41929 2 (US) // EMI 7243 5 42242 2 5 (Canada)

| No. | Title | Origin | Length |
|---|---|---|---|
| 1. | "Space Oddity" | Space Oddity | 5:12 |
| 2. | "Changes" | Hunky Dory | 3:33 |
| 3. | "Suffragette City" | The Rise and Fall of Ziggy Stardust and the Spiders from Mars | 3:24 |
| 4. | "Ziggy Stardust" | The Rise and Fall of Ziggy Stardust and the Spiders from Mars | 3:12 |
| 5. | "The Jean Genie" | Aladdin Sane | 4:05 |
| 6. | "Rebel Rebel" | Diamond Dogs | 4:28 |
| 7. | "Young Americans" (U.S. single version) | Young Americans | 3:13 |
| 8. | "Fame" | Young Americans | 4:14 |
| 9. | "Golden Years" (single version) | Station to Station | 3:27 |
| 10. | ""'Heroes'"" (single version) | "Heroes" | 3:35 |
| 11. | "Ashes to Ashes" (single version) | Scary Monsters (And Super Creeps) | 3:35 |
| 12. | "Fashion" (single version) | Scary Monsters (And Super Creeps) | 3:25 |
| 13. | "Under Pressure" (with Queen, Greatest Hits II edit) | | 3:56 |
| 14. | "Let's Dance" (single version) | Let's Dance | 4:08 |
| 15. | "China Girl" (single version) | Let's Dance | 4:15 |
| 16. | "Modern Love" | Let's Dance | 4:45 |
| 17. | "Blue Jean" | Tonight | 3:10 |
| 18. | "Dancing in the Street" (with Mick Jagger of The Rolling Stones) | Non-album single | 3:20 |
| 19. | "This Is Not America" (with the Pat Metheny Group) | Soundtrack to the film The Falcon and the Snowman | 3:51 |
| 20. | "I'm Afraid of Americans" (V1 radio edit) | Earthling | 4:30 |

=== US and Canada (2 CD Version) ===
CD: Virgin-EMI / 7243 5 41930 2 (US) // EMI 7243 5 42244 2 3 (Canada)

CD 1

| No. | Title | Writer(s) | Place of Origin | Length |
|---|---|---|---|---|
| 1. | "Space Oddity" |
| 2. | "The Man Who Sold the World" |
| 3. | "Changes" |
| 4. | "Life on Mars?" |
| 5. | "Moonage Daydream" | | The Rise and Fall of Ziggy Stardust and the Spiders from Mars | 4:37 |
| 6. | "Suffragette City" |
| 7. | "Ziggy Stardust" |
| 8. | "All the Young Dudes" (Mono version) | | The Best of David Bowie 1969/1974, 1997; originally by Mott the Hoople from All the Young Dudes, 1972; recorded for Aladdin Sane | 4:11 |
| 9. | "The Jean Genie" |
| 10. | "Panic in Detroit" | | Aladdin Sane | 4:25 |
| 11. | "Rebel Rebel" |
| 12. | "Diamond Dogs" |
| 13. | "Young Americans" (U.S. single version) |
| 14. | "Fame" |
| 15. | "Golden Years" (single version) |
| 16. | "TVC 15" (single version) | | | 3:43 |
| 17. | "Sound and Vision" |
| 18. | ""'Heroes'"" (single version) |
| 19. | "DJ" | Bowie, Eno, Alomar | Lodger | 3:59 |

CD 2

| No. | Title | Writer(s) | Place of Origin | Length |
|---|---|---|---|---|
| 1. | "Ashes to Ashes" (single version) |
| 2. | "Fashion" (single version) |
| 3. | "Scary Monsters (And Super Creeps)" (single version) |
| 4. | "Under Pressure" (with Queen) |
| 5. | "Cat People (Putting Out Fire)" (single version) | Bowie, Giorgio Moroder | Cat People soundtrack, 1982; later re-recorded for Let's Dance, 1983 | 4:08 |
| 6. | "Let's Dance" (single version) |
| 7. | "China Girl" (single version) |
| 8. | "Modern Love" |
| 9. | "Blue Jean" |
| 10. | "This Is Not America" (with the Pat Metheny Group) |
| 11. | "Dancing in the Street" (with Mick Jagger of The Rolling Stones) |
| 12. | "Absolute Beginners" (single version) |
| 13. | "Time Will Crawl" | | Never Let Me Down, 1987 | 4:18 |
| 14. | "Under the God" (performed by Tin Machine) | | Tin Machine, 1989 | 4:06 |
| 15. | "Jump They Say" (radio edit) |
| 16. | "The Hearts Filthy Lesson" (radio edit) | Bowie, Sterling Campbell, Eno, Reeves Gabrels, Mike Garson, Erdal Kızılçay | 1. Outside, 1995 | 3:34 |
| 17. | "I'm Afraid of Americans" (V1 radio edit) |
| 18. | "Thursday's Child" (radio edit) | Bowie, Gabrels | Hours, 1999 | 4:25 |
| 19. | "Slow Burn" (radio edit) |

=== Belgium (1 CD) ===
CD: EMI / 5 41888 2 (Belgium)

| No. | Title | Writer(s) | Place of Origin | Length |
|---|---|---|---|---|
| 1. | "Let's Dance" (single version) |
| 2. | "Fame" |
| 3. | "Fashion" (single version) |
| 4. | "This Is Not America" (with the Pat Metheny Group) |
| 5. | "Space Oddity" |
| 6. | "Ziggy Stardust" |
| 7. | "The Jean Genie" |
| 8. | "Golden Years" (single version) |
| 9. | "Absolute Beginners" (single version) |
| 10. | "Ashes to Ashes" (single version) |
| 11. | "Changes" |
| 12. | "Rebel Rebel" |
| 13. | ""'Heroes'"" (single version) |
| 14. | "Young Americans" (U.S. single version) |
| 15. | "Under Pressure" (with Queen) |
| 16. | "Tonight" (with Tina Turner) | Bowie, Pop | Tonight; originally by Iggy Pop from Lust for Life, 1977 | 3:50 |
| 17. | "China Girl" (single version) |
| 18. | "Blue Jean" |
| 19. | "Dancing in the Street" (with Mick Jagger of The Rolling Stones) |
| 20. | "Slow Burn" (radio edit) |

=== Germany, Switzerland and Austria (1 CD) ===
CD: EMI / 5 41912 2 (Germany/Switzerland/Austria)

| No. | Title | Writer(s) | Place of Origin | Length |
|---|---|---|---|---|
| 1. | "Let's Dance" (single version) |
| 2. | "Ashes to Ashes" (single version) |
| 3. | ""Helden"" (German version of single version) | Bowie, Eno | ""Heroes"" single, 1977 | 3:40 |
| 4. | "Fame '90" (Gass mix) |
| 5. | "Young Americans" (U.S. single version) |
| 6. | "Fashion" (single version) |
| 7. | "Ziggy Stardust" |
| 8. | "Space Oddity" |
| 9. | "When The Wind Blows" (radio edit) | Bowie, Erdal Kızılçay | When the Wind Blows soundtrack, 1986 | 3:32 |
| 10. | "Cat People (Putting Out Fire)" (single version) |
| 11. | "Sound and Vision" |
| 12. | "Loving the Alien" (single remix) |
| 13. | "Blue Jean" |
| 14. | "China Girl" (single version) |
| 15. | "Under Pressure" (with Queen) |
| 16. | "Dancing in the Street" (with Mick Jagger of The Rolling Stones) |
| 17. | "Absolute Beginners" (single version) |
| 18. | "This Is Not America" (with the Pat Metheny Group) |
| 19. | "Thursday's Child" (radio edit) |
| 20. | "Slow Burn" (radio edit) |

=== Denmark (2 CD) ===
CD: EMI / 5 41918 2 (Denmark)

CD 1

| No. | Title | Length |
|---|---|---|
| 1. | "Let's Dance" (single version) |
| 2. | "Rebel Rebel" |
| 3. | "This Is Not America" (with the Pat Metheny Group) |
| 4. | "Dancing in the Street" (with Mick Jagger of The Rolling Stones) |
| 5. | "Fame" |
| 6. | "The Jean Genie" |
| 7. | "Jump They Say" (radio edit) |
| 8. | ""'Heroes'"" (single version) |
| 9. | "Fashion" (single version) |
| 10. | "Changes" |
| 11. | "TVC 15" |
| 12. | "China Girl" (single version) |
| 13. | "Absolute Beginners" (single version) |
| 14. | "Thursday's Child" (radio edit) |
| 15. | "Ziggy Stardust" |
| 16. | "Ashes to Ashes" (single version) |
| 17. | "Drive-In Saturday" |
| 18. | "Space Oddity" |

CD 2

| No. | Title | Place of Origin | Length |
|---|---|---|---|
| 1. | "Young Americans" (U.S. single version) |
| 2. | "Slow Burn" (radio edit) |
| 3. | "Life on Mars?" |
| 4. | "Under Pressure" (with Queen) |
| 5. | "Hallo Spaceboy" (Pet Shop Boys remix; with the Pet Shop Boys) |
| 6. | "Sorrow" |
| 7. | "Blue Jean" |
| 8. | "Sound and Vision" |
| 9. | "Little Wonder" (single version) |
| 10. | "Starman" |
| 11. | "Boys Keep Swinging" |
| 12. | "Loving the Alien" (single remix) |
| 13. | "Golden Years" (single version) |
| 14. | "John, I'm Only Dancing" |
| 15. | "Day-In Day-Out" | Never Let Me Down | 4:14 |
| 16. | "Modern Love" (single version) |
| 17. | "Black Tie White Noise" (single version) | | 4:10 |
| 18. | "Cat People (Putting Out Fire)" (single version) |
| 19. | "Rock 'n' Roll Suicide" | The Rise and Fall of Ziggy Stardust and the Spiders from Mars | 2:59 |

=== Australia (1 CD) ===
CD: EMI / 7243 5 42075 2 (Australia)

| No. | Title | Length |
|---|---|---|
| 1. | "Space Oddity" | 5:12 |
| 2. | "Changes" | 3:33 |
| 3. | "Starman" | 4:10 |
| 4. | "Ziggy Stardust" | 3:12 |
| 5. | "The Jean Genie" | 4:05 |
| 6. | "Sorrow" | 2:53 |
| 7. | "1984" | 3:27 |
| 8. | "Young Americans" (U.S. single version) | 5:12 |
| 9. | ""'Heroes'"" (single version) | 3:35 |
| 10. | "Ashes to Ashes" (single version) | 3:35 |
| 11. | "Fashion" (single version) | 3:25 |
| 12. | "Under Pressure" (with Queen) | 3:56 |
| 13. | "Let's Dance" (single version) | 4:08 |
| 14. | "China Girl" (single version) | 4:15 |
| 15. | "Modern Love" (single version) | 3:56 |
| 16. | "Blue Jean" | 3:10 |
| 17. | "Fame '90" (Gass mix) | 3:37 |
| 18. | "Dancing in the Street" (with Mick Jagger) | 3:20 |
| 19. | "Slow Burn" (radio edit) | 3:55 |

=== New Zealand (2 CD) ===
CD: EMI 7243 5 41925 2 4 (New Zealand)

CD 1

| No. | Title | Length |
|---|---|---|
| 1. | "Space Oddity" | 5:12 |
| 2. | "The Man Who Sold the World" | 3:56 |
| 3. | "Oh! You Pretty Things" | 3:11 |
| 4. | "Changes" | 3:33 |
| 5. | "Life on Mars?" | 3:49 |
| 6. | "Starman" | 4:10 |
| 7. | "Ziggy Stardust" | 3:12 |
| 8. | "Suffragette City" | 3:24 |
| 9. | "John, I'm Only Dancing" | 2:45 |
| 10. | "The Jean Genie" | 4:05 |
| 11. | "Sorrow" | 2:53 |
| 12. | "Diamond Dogs" | 6:04 |
| 13. | "Rebel Rebel" | 4:28 |
| 14. | "1984" | 3:27 |
| 15. | "Young Americans" | 5:13 |
| 16. | "Fame" | 4:14 |
| 17. | "Golden Years" (single version) | 3:27 |
| 18. | "Sound and Vision" | 3:03 |
| 19. | ""'Heroes'"" (single version) | 3:35 |
| 20. | "Under Pressure" (with Queen) | 3:56 |

CD 2

| No. | Title | Length |
|---|---|---|
| 1. | "Ashes to Ashes" (single version) | 3:35 |
| 2. | "Fashion" (single version) | 3:25 |
| 3. | "Cat People" (single version) | 3:32 |
| 4. | "Let's Dance" (single version) | 4:08 |
| 5. | "China Girl" (single version) | 4:15 |
| 6. | "Modern Love" (single version) | 3:56 |
| 7. | "Blue Jean" | 3:10 |
| 8. | "Tonight" | 3:45 |
| 9. | "This Is Not America" (with the Pat Metheny Group) | 3:51 |
| 10. | "Dancing in the Street" (with Mick Jagger) | 3:20 |
| 11. | "Absolute Beginners" (single version) | 5:37 |
| 12. | "Underground" (single version) | 4:27 |
| 13. | "Magic Dance" (single version) | 4:00 |
| 14. | "Day-In, Day-Out" (single version) | 5:37 |
| 15. | "Jump They Say" (radio edit) | 3:52 |
| 16. | "Hallo Spaceboy" (Pet Shop Boys remix) | 4:25 |
| 17. | "Little Wonder" (edit) | 3:41 |
| 18. | "Thursday's Child" (radio edit) | 4:27 |
| 19. | "Slow Burn" (radio edit) | 3:57 |

=== Colombia, Ecuador, Peru and Venezuela (1 CD) ===
CD: EMI 7243541900-2 (Colombia/Ecuador/Peru/Venezuela)

| No. | Title | Place of Origin | Length |
|---|---|---|---|
| 1. | "The Man Who Sold the World" |
| 2. | "Changes" |
| 3. | "Life on Mars?" |
| 4. | "Starman" |
| 5. | "Young Americans" (U.S. single version) |
| 6. | "Fame" |
| 7. | ""'Heroes'"" (single version) |
| 8. | "Under Pressure" (with Queen) |
| 9. | "Ashes to Ashes" (single version) |
| 10. | "Let's Dance" (single version) |
| 11. | "China Girl" (single version) |
| 12. | "Modern Love" (single version) |
| 13. | "Blue Jean" |
| 14. | "This Is Not America" (with the Pat Metheny Group) |
| 15. | "Never Let Me Down" (single version) | Never Let Me Down | 3:58 |
| 16. | "Dancing in the Street" (with Mick Jagger of The Rolling Stones) |
| 17. | "Fame '90" (Gass mix) | Changesbowie, 1990 | 3:36 |
| 18. | "Hallo Spaceboy" (Pet Shop Boys mix; with the Pet Shop Boys) |
| 19. | "Little Wonder" (single version) |
| 20. | "Slow Burn" (radio edit) |

=== Hong Kong (3 CD) ===
CD: EMI / 5 77949 2 (Hong Kong)

CD 1

| No. | Title | Length |
|---|---|---|
| 1. | "Space Oddity" |
| 2. | "The Man Who Sold the World" |
| 3. | "Oh! You Pretty Things" |
| 4. | "Changes" |
| 5. | "Life on Mars?" |
| 6. | "Starman" |
| 7. | "Ziggy Stardust" |
| 8. | "Suffragette City" |
| 9. | "John, I'm Only Dancing" |
| 10. | "The Jean Genie" |
| 11. | "Drive-In Saturday" |
| 12. | "Sorrow" |
| 13. | "Diamond Dogs" |
| 14. | "Rebel Rebel" |
| 15. | "Young Americans" (U.S. single version) |
| 16. | "Fame" |
| 17. | "Golden Years" (single version) |
| 18. | "TVC 15" |
| 19. | "Wild Is the Wind" |

CD 2

| No. | Title | Length |
|---|---|---|
| 1. | "Sound and Vision" |
| 2. | ""'Heroes'"" (single version) |
| 3. | "Boys Keep Swinging" |
| 4. | "Under Pressure" (with Queen) |
| 5. | "Ashes to Ashes" (single version) |
| 6. | "Fashion" (single version) |
| 7. | "Scary Monsters (and Super Creeps)" (single version) |
| 8. | "Let's Dance" (single version) |
| 9. | "China Girl" (single version) |
| 10. | "Modern Love" (single version) |
| 11. | "Blue Jean" |
| 12. | "This Is Not America" (with the Pat Metheny Group) |
| 13. | "Loving the Alien" (single remix) |
| 14. | "Dancing in the Street" (with Mick Jagger of The Rolling Stones) |
| 15. | "Absolute Beginners" (single version) |
| 16. | "Jump They Say" (radio edit) |
| 17. | "Hallo Spaceboy" (Pet Shop Boys remix; with the Pet Shop Boys) |
| 18. | "Little Wonder" (single version) |
| 19. | "I'm Afraid of Americans" (V1 radio edit) |
| 20. | "Slow Burn" (radio edit) |

CD 3

Later to be released on its own as Club Bowie, 2003
| No. | Title | Length |
|---|---|---|
| 1. | "Loving the Alien" (Scumfrog vs. Bowie) |
| 2. | "Let's Dance" (Trifactor vs. Deeper Substance remix) | 11:02 |
| 3. | "Just for One Day ("Heroes")" (David Guetta vs. Bowie) |
| 4. | "This Is Not America" (Scumfrog vs. Bowie; with the Pat Metheny Group) |
| 5. | "Shout (Fashion)" (Solaris vs. Bowie) | 8:02 |
| 6. | "China Girl" (Riff & Vox Club mix) |
| 7. | "Magic Dance" (Danny S Magic Party remix) |
| 8. | "Let's Dance" (Club Bolly extended mix) |
| 9. | "Let's Dance" (Club Bolly mix with enhanced video) |

- Album released in 2004.

=== Argentina and Mexico (1 CD) ===
CD: EMI / 7243 5 41916 2 6 (Argentina/Mexico)

| No. | Title | Length |
|---|---|---|
| 1. | "Space Oddity" |
| 2. | "The Man Who Sold the World" |
| 3. | "Changes" |
| 4. | "Ziggy Stardust" |
| 5. | "Young Americans" (U.S. single version) |
| 6. | "Fame" |
| 7. | ""'Heroes'"" (single version) |
| 8. | "Under Pressure" (with Queen) |
| 9. | "Ashes to Ashes" (single version) |
| 10. | "Let's Dance" (single version) |
| 11. | "China Girl" (single version) |
| 12. | "Modern Love" (single version) |
| 13. | "Blue Jean" |
| 14. | "This Is Not America" (with the Pat Metheny Group) |
| 15. | "Dancing in the Street" (with Mick Jagger of The Rolling Stones) |
| 16. | "Jump They Say" (radio edit) |
| 17. | "Hallo Spaceboy" (Pet Shop Boys remix; with the Pet Shop Boys) |
| 18. | "Little Wonder" (single version) |
| 19. | "Thursday's Child" (radio edit) |
| 20. | "Slow Burn" (radio edit) |

=== Brazil (1 CD) ===
CD: EMI / 7243 5 41899 2 0 (Brazil)

| No. | Title | Length |
|---|---|---|
| 1. | "Space Oddity" |
| 2. | "Changes" |
| 3. | "Life on Mars?" |
| 4. | "Starman" |
| 5. | "Ziggy Stardust" |
| 6. | "John, I'm Only Dancing" |
| 7. | "The Jean Genie" |
| 8. | "Rebel Rebel" |
| 9. | "Young Americans" (single version) |
| 10. | "Fame" |
| 11. | "Golden Years" (single version) |
| 12. | "Sound and Vision" |
| 13. | ""'Heroes'"" (single version) |
| 14. | "Ashes to Ashes" (single version) |
| 15. | "Fashion" (single version) |
| 16. | "Under Pressure" (with Queen) |
| 17. | "Let's Dance" (single version) |
| 18. | "China Girl" (single version) |
| 19. | "Thursday's Child" (radio edit) |

=== Japan and Thailand (1 CD) ===
CD: Toshiba-EMI / TOCP-67061 (Japan/Thailand)

| No. | Title | Place of Origin | Length |
|---|---|---|---|
| 1. | "Space Oddity" |
| 2. | "Changes" |
| 3. | "Life on Mars?" |
| 4. | "Starman" |
| 5. | "Lady Stardust" | The Rise and Fall of Ziggy Stardust and the Spiders from Mars | 3:20 |
| 6. | "Ziggy Stardust" |
| 7. | "The Jean Genie" |
| 8. | "Rebel Rebel" |
| 9. | "Young Americans" (U.S. single version) |
| 10. | "Fame" |
| 11. | "Golden Years" (single version) |
| 12. | ""'Heroes'"" (single version) |
| 13. | "Ashes to Ashes" (single version) |
| 14. | "Fashion" (single version) |
| 15. | "Under Pressure" (with Queen) |
| 16. | "Let's Dance" (single version) |
| 17. | "China Girl" (single version) |
| 18. | "Modern Love" (single version) |
| 19. | "Dancing in the Street" (with Mick Jagger of The Rolling Stones) |
| 20. | "Slow Burn" (radio edit) |

=== US (2003 Limited Edition 1 CD with bonus DVD) ===
CD same as 2002 US and Canada 1 CD version Bonus DVD: / Virgin/EMI 5 95692 0 (US)

| No. | Title | Writer(s) | Place of Origin | Length |
|---|---|---|---|---|
| 1. | "Let's Dance" (Club Bolly mix – DVD video) | Bowie, Anita Kaur, Navin Kumar Singh | Later to be released on Club Bowie (2003) the following year | 3:53 |
| 2. | "Just for One Day ("Heroes")" (David Guetta vs. Bowie – DVD video) | Bowie, Eno, Guetta | Later to be released on Club Bowie the following year | 3:00 |
| 3. | "Black Tie White Noise" (live at the Hollywood Center Studios, 5/8/93 – DVD video) | | Originally from Black Tie White Noise | 4:47 |
| 4. | "Let's Dance" (Club Bolly extended mix) | | Later to be released on Club Bowie the following year | 7:57 |
| 5. | "Let's Dance" (Bollyclub mix) | | | 4:49 |
| 6. | "China Girl" (club mix) | | | 7:16 |
| 7. | "Just for One Day ("Heroes")" (David Guetta vs. Bowie extended version) | | Later to be released on Club Bowie the following year | 6:36 |
| 8. | "Loving the Alien" (Scumfrog remix) | | Later to be released on Club Bowie the following year | 8:20 |
| 9. | "Nite Flights" (Moodswings Back to Basics remix) | | Originally from Black Tie White Noise; originally by The Walker Brothers from Nite Flights, 1978 | 9:57 |

== DVD track listing ==
Best of Bowie

Video by David Bowie
- Released: 2002
- Recorded: 1972–1999
- Length: 203 minutes
- Label: EMI

David Bowie chronology
| Black Tie White Noise (1993) | Best of Bowie (2002) | A Reality Tour (2004) |

DVD content identical worldwide

DVD 1

| No. | Title | Description | Length |
|---|---|---|---|
| 1. | "Oh! You Pretty Things" | live on The Old Grey Whistle Test, 1972 | 3:35 |
| 2. | "Queen Bitch" | live on The Old Grey Whistle Test, 1972 | 3:28 |
| 3. | "Five Years" | live on The Old Grey Whistle Test, 1972 | 5:15 |
| 4. | "Starman" | live on Top of the Pops, 1972 | 3:48 |
| 5. | "John, I'm Only Dancing" | video, 1972 | 3:02 |
| 6. | "The Jean Genie" | video, 1972 | 4:16 |
| 7. | "Space Oddity" | video, 1972 | 5:20 |
| 8. | "Drive-In Saturday" | live on Russell Harty plus..., 1973 | 4:47 |
| 9. | "Life on Mars?" | video, 1973 | 4:14 |
| 10. | "Ziggy Stardust" | live from Ziggy Stardust and the Spiders from Mars: The Motion Picture, 3 July 1973 | 3:22 |
| 11. | "Rebel Rebel" | TopPop, 1974 | 4:38 |
| 12. | "Young Americans" | live on The Dick Cavett Show, 1974 | 5:20 |
| 13. | "Be My Wife" | video, 1977 | 3:13 |
| 14. | ""Heroes"" | video, 1977 | 3:41 |
| 15. | "Boys Keep Swinging" | video, 1979 | 3:29 |
| 16. | "DJ" | video, 1979 | 4:19 |
| 17. | "Look Back in Anger" | video, 1979 | 3:13 |
| 18. | "Ashes to Ashes" | video, 1980 | 3:47 |
| 19. | "Fashion" | video, 1980 | 3:36 |
| 20. | "Wild is the Wind" | video, 1981 | 3:46 |
| 21. | "Let's Dance" | video, 1983 | 4:19 |
| 22. | "China Girl" | video, 1983 (censored version) | 4:16 |
| 23. | "Modern Love" | video, 1983 | 3:59 |
| 24. | "Cat People (Putting Out Fire)" | live at the Pacific National Exhibition Coliseum, 12 September 1983 | 4:32 |
| 25. | "Blue Jean" | video, 1984 | 3:36 |
| 26. | "Loving the Alien" | video, 1985 (censored version) | 4:56 |
| 27. | "Dancing in the Street" (with Mick Jagger) | video, 1985 | 3:07 |

Easter eggs
| No. | Title | Description | Length |
|---|---|---|---|
| 1. | "Oh! You Pretty Things" | live on The Old Grey Whistle Test alternate take, 1972. Title 2 chapter 1 on the DVD | 3:43 |
| 2. | "Interview with David Bowie by Russell Harty" | live on Russell Harty plus..., 1973. Title 30 on the DVD. | 2:11 |
| 3. | "Ad for the then-forthcoming Ziggy Stardust and the Spiders from Mars: The Motion Picture DVD" | Still image accessed by clicking on the lightning bolt next to track 10 "Ziggy Stardust" in the track listing. | 0:00 |
| 4. | "Jazzin' for Blue Jean" | full 20-minute video for "Blue Jean", 1984. Title 31 on the DVD. | 20:15 |
| 5. | "Blue Jean" | alternate video for MTV, 1984 Title 32 on the DVD. | 3:55 |

DVD 2

| No. | Title | Description | Length |
|---|---|---|---|
| 1. | "Absolute Beginners" | video, 1986 (extended version) | 8:08 |
| 2. | "Underground" | video, 1986 | 4:53 |
| 3. | "As the World Falls Down" | video, 1986 | 3:52 |
| 4. | "Day-In Day-Out" | video, 1987 (censored version) | 6:55 |
| 5. | "Time Will Crawl" | video, 1987 | 4:19 |
| 6. | "Never Let Me Down" | video, 1987 | 5:05 |
| 7. | "Fame '90" | video, 1990 | 3:56 |
| 8. | "Jump They Say" | video, 1993 | 4:14 |
| 9. | "Black Tie White Noise" | video, 1993 | 4:21 |
| 10. | "Miracle Goodnight" | video, 1993 | 4:24 |
| 11. | "The Buddha of Suburbia" | video, 1994 | 4:38 |
| 12. | "The Hearts Filthy Lesson" | video, 1995 (censored version) | 5:09 |
| 13. | "Strangers When We Meet" | video, 1995 | 4:33 |
| 14. | "Hallo Spaceboy" | video, 1996 | 4:43 |
| 15. | "Little Wonder" | video, 1997 | 4:16 |
| 16. | "Dead Man Walking" | video, 1997 | 4:01 |
| 17. | "Seven Years in Tibet" | video, 1997 | 4:10 |
| 18. | "I'm Afraid of Americans" | video, 1997 | 4:38 |
| 19. | "Thursday's Child" | video, 1999 | 4:58 |
| 20. | "Survive" | video, 1999 | 3:45 |

Easter eggs
| No. | Title | Description | Length |
|---|---|---|---|
| 1. | "Day-In Day-Out" | video for the edited dance mix, 1987. Title 24 on the DVD. | 3:29 |
| 2. | "Miracle Goodnight" | video for the remix version, 1993. Title 23 on the DVD. | 4:43 |
| 3. | "Seven Years in Tibet" | video for the Mandarin language version, 1997. Title 25 on the DVD. | 4:13 |
| 4. | "Survive" | live at the Élysée Montmartre, 14 October 1999. Title 2 chapter 20 on the DVD. | 4:39 |

== Charts ==
=== Weekly charts ===
| Chart (2002–2016) | Peak position |
|---|---|
| Australian Albums (ARIA) | 6 |
| Belgian Albums (Ultratop Flanders) | 13 |
| Belgian Albums (Ultratop Wallonia) | 4 |
| Canadian Albums (Billboard) | 4 |
| Croatian International Albums (HDU) | 32 |
| Danish Albums (Hitlisten) | 14 |
| Dutch Albums (Album Top 100) | 19 |
| Finnish Albums (Suomen virallinen lista) | 15 |
| French Albums (SNEP) | 19 |
| German Albums (Offizielle Top 100) | 16 |
| Hungarian Albums (MAHASZ) | 29 |
| Irish Albums (IRMA) | 6 |
| Italian Albums (FIMI) | 23 |
| New Zealand Albums (RMNZ) | 6 |
| Norwegian Albums (VG-lista) | 10 |
| Portuguese Albums (AFP) | 8 |
| Scottish Albums (Official Charts) | 1 |
| Spanish Albums (Promusicae) | 97 |
| Swedish Albums (Sverigetopplistan) | 9 |
| Swiss Albums (Schweizer Hitparade) | 15 |
| UK Albums (Official Charts) | 1 |
| US Billboard 200 | 4 |
| US Top Catalog Albums (Billboard) | 1 |

=== Year-end charts ===
| Chart (2002) | Position |
|---|---|
| Belgian Albums (Ultratop Wallonia) | 99 |
| Canadian Alternative Albums (Nielsen SoundScan) | 88 |
| Canadian Alternative Albums (Nielsen SoundScan); 2-CD release | 179 |
| Swedish Albums (Sverigetopplistan) | 70 |
| UK Albums (OCC) | 64 |
| Chart (2003) | Position |
| UK Albums (OCC) | 100 |
| Chart (2013) | Position |
| UK Albums (OCC) | 103 |
| Chart (2016) | Position |
| Australian Albums (ARIA) | 96 |
| UK Albums (OCC) | 10 |
| US Billboard 200 | 86 |
| US Catalog Albums (Billboard) | 9 |

== Certifications ==
=== Album ===
| Region | Certification | Certified units/sales |
|---|---|---|
| Australia (ARIA) | 2× Platinum | 140,000^{^} |
| Finland (Musiikkituottajat) | Gold | 15,006 |
| Italy (FIMI) sales since 2009 | Platinum | 50,000^{*} |
| New Zealand (RMNZ) | 3× Platinum | 45,000^{^} |
| United Kingdom (BPI) | 4× Platinum | 1,200,000^{‡} |
| United States (RIAA) | Platinum | 500,000^{^} |
Summaries
| Europe (IFPI) | 2× Platinum | 2,000,000^{*} |
^{*} Sales figures based on certification alone.^{^} Shipments figures based on certification alone.^{‡} Sales+streaming figures based on certification alone.

=== DVD ===
| Region | Certification | Certified units/sales |
|---|---|---|
| Argentina (CAPIF) | Platinum | 8,000^{^} |
| Australia (ARIA) | 2× Platinum | 30,000^{^} |
| Canada (Music Canada) | 2× Platinum | 20,000^{^} |
| France (SNEP) | 3× Platinum | 60,000^{*} |
| Germany (BVMI) | Gold | 25,000^{^} |
| Spain (Promusicae) | Platinum | 25,000^{^} |
| United Kingdom (BPI) | 3× Platinum | 150,000^{*} |
| United States (RIAA) | Platinum | 100,000^{^} |
^{*} Sales figures based on certification alone.^{^} Shipments figures based on certification alone.
