= Labyrinth (1986 soundtrack) =

Soundtrack album by David Bowie and Trevor Jones
- Released: 23 June 1986
- Recorded: July–September 1985
- Genres: Pop; new wave; film soundtrack
- Length: 43:33
- Label: EMI AML 3104
- Producers: David Bowie; Trevor Jones; Arif Mardin

David Bowie chronology
Tonight (1984)	Labyrinth (1986)	Never Let Me Down (1987)

Trevor Jones chronology
Runaway Train (1985)	Labyrinth (1986)	Angel Heart (1987)

Singles from Labyrinth
- 1. "Underground" Released: 9 June 1986; 2. "Magic Dance" Released: January 1987

Labyrinth is a soundtrack album by David Bowie and composer Trevor Jones, released in 1986 for the film Labyrinth. It was the second of three soundtrack releases in which Bowie had a major role, following Christiane F. (1981) and preceding The Buddha of Suburbia (1993). The soundtrack album features Jones' score, which is split into six tracks for the soundtrack: "Into the Labyrinth", "Sarah", "Hallucination", "The Goblin Battle", "Thirteen O'Clock", and "Home at Last".

== Background ==
Jones had scored director Jim Henson's previous film, The Dark Crystal (1982), and suggested using rock music for Labyrinth as a departure from The Dark Crystal's symphonic soundtrack. This inspired Henson to find a contemporary rock artist who could write songs for Labyrinth and star in the main role of Jareth; Bowie was his first choice. Henson approached Bowie to take part in the film in 1983 during Bowie's Serious Moonlight Tour, when he showed Bowie early designs for the movie and a tape of The Dark Crystal. Bowie had wanted to make music for a children's film and saw this as his chance.

Bowie wrote and recorded five songs for the film: "Underground", "Magic Dance", "Chilly Down", "As the World Falls Down", and "Within You". In the process, he also wrote lyrics for two songs, "All in All" and "Crystal Heartbeat", which did not feature in the final film or soundtrack. The film's theme song, "Underground", features on the soundtrack twice, first in an edited version that was played over the film's opening sequence and secondly in full. The only song Bowie did not perform lead vocals on is "Chilly Down", which was performed by Charles Augins, Richard Bodkin, Kevin Clash, and Danny John-Jules, the actors who voiced the 'Fire Gang' creatures in the film.

Jones' score for Labyrinth is entirely synthetic. He stated that he would have added an orchestra, but "the score seemed to stop at a particular point in its development and Jim [Henson] said he quite liked it like that." The score contains a great many cues, which made it seem "enormous" because "we had to play everything. When you’re doing synthesisers you have to play the whole lot." In 1999 Jones recalled his experience of working on Labyrinth as "probably one of the most romantic projects I've ever worked on."

== Release ==
The soundtrack album was released in July 1986 to coincide with the film's US premiere. "Underground" was released in various territories as a single in June 1986, and in certain markets was also released in an instrumental version and an extended dance mix. In January 1987 "Magic Dance" was released as a 12" single in limited markets, including the US. "As the World Falls Down" was initially slated for release as a follow-up single to "Underground" at Christmas in 1986, but this plan did not materialize.

In 2017, the album was remastered and reissued on vinyl by Capitol Records, with a replication of the original jacket and artwork, including the original release's EMI America logo and inner sleeve featuring photos of Bowie from the film. A second pressing the same year also included limited runs of green and lavender coloured vinyl.

== Promotion ==
The soundtrack was advertised in music trade papers such as Billboard. Steve Barron produced promotional music videos for "Underground" and "As the World Falls Down". The music video for "Underground" features Bowie as a nightclub singer who stumbles upon the world of the Labyrinth, encountering many of the creatures seen in the film. The video for "As the World Falls Down" integrates clips from the film, using them alongside black-and-white shots of Bowie performing the song in an elegant room accompanied by the character Hoggle.

Though Bowie was not heavily involved in promoting Labyrinth, Jim Henson was nonetheless grateful that he had made the promotional music videos, saying, "I think it's the best thing he could have done for the film." Barron's videos for "As the World Falls Down" and "Underground" so impressed Henson that he recruited Barron to direct his television series The StoryTeller.

== Critical reception ==
Professional ratings
Review scores
Source	Rating
AllMusic	3/5 stars

Upon release in 1986, Labyrinth reached #68 on the Billboard 200 chart in the United States and #38 on the United Kingdom's Official Albums Chart. The album re-entered the Official Albums Chart in 2017, peaking at #58. According to biographer David Buckley in 2015, the Labyrinth soundtrack was Bowie's third-best selling iTunes album in the United Kingdom.

Adam Trainer in Senses of Cinema described Bowie's five songs as "spirited and imaginative ... presenting satisfying melodies and singalong choruses" such as that of "Magic Dance". However, while writing that the songs work well within the context of the film, "echoing its plotline and themes such as imagination, fun and fantasy", Trainer considered the songs to be over-produced and too "self-consciously pop". Sean Stangland of the Daily Herald wrote "The five songs [Bowie] wrote for the film are as confoundingly diverse as the rest of his career." Calling the soundtrack "absolutely stellar", Screen Rant described Bowie's Labyrinth songs as "absolute earworms that contribute to his legacy just as much as Ziggy Stardust and all the rest."

The Labyrinth soundtrack has been included on lists of the top 50 movie soundtracks by Paste magazine and Gigwise. MovieWeb ranked Labyrinth number one on its list of the best film soundtracks of the 1980s.

== Track listing ==
Side one
No.	Title	Writer(s)	Length
1.	"Opening Titles Including Underground"	music by Trevor Jones; lyrics by Bowie	3:21
2.	"Into the Labyrinth"	Jones	2:12
3.	"Magic Dance"	Bowie	5:13 (Note: On the 2017 vinyl reissue, "Magic Dance" has been edited down to 4:13)
4.	"Sarah"	Jones	3:12
5.	"Chilly Down"	Bowie	3:44
6.	"Hallucination"	Jones	3:02

Side two
No.	Title	Writer(s)	Length
1.	"As the World Falls Down"	Bowie	4:51
2.	"The Goblin Battle"	Jones	3:31
3.	"Within You"	Bowie	3:30
4.	"Thirteen O'Clock"	Jones	3:06
5.	"Home at Last"	Jones	1:49
6.	"Underground"	Bowie	5:57
Total length:			43:33

== Personnel ==
Credits per biographer Nicholas Pegg.

Musicians

- David Bowie – vocals, backing vocals, producer
- Arif Mardin – producer
- Trevor Jones – keyboards, producer
- Ray Russell – lead guitar
- Albert Collins – guitar
- Dann Huff – guitar
- Paul Westwood – bass guitar
- Will Lee – bass guitar
- Matthew Seligman – bass guitar
- Neil Conti – drums
- Steve Ferrone – drums
- Harold Fisher - drums
- Robbie Buchanan – keyboards, synthesizer
- Brian Gascoigne – keyboards
- David Lawson – keyboards
- Ray Warleigh – saxophone
- Bob Gay - saxophone
- Maurice Murphy – trumpet
- Robin Beck – backing vocals
- Chaka Khan – backing vocals
- Cissy Houston – backing vocals
- Danny John-Jules – backing vocals
- Fonzi Thornton – backing vocals
- Luther Vandross – backing vocals

== Charts ==
Chart performance for Labyrinth
Chart (1986)	Peak position
Dutch Albums (Album Top 100)	39
European Albums (Music & Media)	39
German Albums (Offizielle Top 100)	29
New Zealand Albums (RMNZ)	15
UK Albums (Official Charts)	38
US Billboard 200	68

Chart (2017)	Peak position
Scottish Albums (Official Charts)	44
UK Albums (Official Charts)	58
UK Soundtrack Albums (Official Charts)	5

Chart (2026)	Peak position
UK Soundtrack Albums (Official Charts)	2
