= Dream guide =

Spirit guide dream character

A dream guide is a spirit guide dream character encountered in a dream, particular a fully lucid dream.

On the scale of lucidity, "full" lucidity requires that all characters in a dream, not just the dreamer, be aware that they are in a dream. In this case, "another dream character not only becomes lucid before the dream-ego, he also possesses a higher degree of lucidity than the dream-ego later achieves."

Anthony Shafton gives the following example of encountering a dream guide:

The dream guide "told me, 'There is no reason to worry because you are dreaming!' I did not believe him and ... he told me ... that I would be able to see that we were part of a dream. Only after this ... was I convinced that I was in a dream. Then I said that I would never have found out by myself that I was dreaming. He replied that he knew that and that was why he was there.

Generally, the stage of capacity of a dream guide to put in such an appearance so as to inform the unwitting dreamer of the fact that this is a dream; must be preceded by the stage (achieved in some previous nights) of the witting dreamer informing (in a manner acceptable, or course, to themselves) prospective dream guides of the fact of this being a dream, and securing their agreement to this fact. This stage will in turn have quite likely have been preceded by a still earlier stage in which the witting dreamer will have endeavored to secure the agreement, by prospective dream guides, of the fact of this being a dream, but having been rebuffed by them (the rebuff have been due merely to the statement's not having been made in a style suitable to their literary fashion, which can be quite punctilious).
