= Magic Dance =

Song by David Bowie

Single by David Bowie

from the album Labyrinth
- B-side: "Within You"
- Released: January 1987
- Recorded: 1985
- Genre: Synth-pop; pop rock
- Length: 5:13 (album version); 4:00 (single version)
- Label: EMI America
- Songwriter: David Bowie
- Producers: David Bowie; Arif Mardin

David Bowie singles chronology
"When the Wind Blows" (1986)	"Magic Dance" (1987)	"Day-In Day-Out" (1987)

"Magic Dance" (also known as "Dance Magic") is a song written and recorded by the English singer David Bowie for the Jim Henson musical fantasy film Labyrinth (1986). It was released as a single in limited markets worldwide in January 1987. Upon Bowie's death in 2016, the single version of "Magic Dance" reached #63 on the iTunes chart in the UK.

== Details and background ==
Bowie wrote and recorded five songs for Labyrinth, in which he also starred as Jareth, the king of the goblins. "Magic Dance" was written for a scene in which Jareth and his goblins entertain a crying baby that has been wished away to them by the film's heroine, Sarah Williams. In the film, Bowie performs the number with Toby Froud as the baby, and 50 puppets and 12 costumed extras as the goblins.

Described as a "simple dance number that's driven by electric bass and emphatic drums", "Magic Dance" includes song lyrics that refer to the film The Bachelor and the Bobby-Soxer (1947) starring Cary Grant and Shirley Temple, in which the two have a call and reply verse: "You remind me of a man." "What man?" "The man with the power." "What power?" "The power of hoodoo." "Who do?" "You do!". In "Magic Dance," "man" is replaced with "babe" and "hoodoo" with "voodoo". According to Nicholas Pegg, the verse is an "old playground nonsense-chant" that was originally popularized by The Bachelor and the Bobby-Soxer.

Bowie performed the baby's gurgles in the song recording of "Magic Dance", as backing vocalist Diva Gray's baby, the intended vocalist, wouldn't gurgle on the microphone. In the actual scene of the film, baby vocals were dubbed in by a more cooperative infant. During the movie's production, and in the end credits, the song was referred to as "Dance Magic."

== Release ==
"Magic Dance" is the third track on the Labyrinth soundtrack, released in July 1986 to coincide with the film's US premiere. In 1987 the song was released on 12" in limited markets, including the US. A single version was mixed but never released, and an edit of the "Dance Mix" (incorrectly labeled as the 'single mix') was released on the New Zealand edition of Best of Bowie (2002). The single was not released commercially in the UK until the digital download version was made available in early 2007.

Further adding to the confusion is that a new 4:13 edit of album version replaces the full-length 5:13 album version on all post-2017 reissues of the soundtrack (including in the Loving the Alien (1983–1988) box set).

== Critical reception ==
In 1986, "Magic Dance" peaked at #40 in New Zealand. At the time of Bowie's death in 2016, "Magic Dance" was the 19th highest selling Bowie song digitally downloaded in the United Kingdom.

BBC America called "Magic Dance" "one of Bowie's most playful and underrated songs", while Vice's Kamila Rymajdo considered it to be "perhaps the most joyous song about magic, ever". David Brusie of The A.V. Club called the song "infectiously silly", and wrote that it has a "manic energy". Writing for Gizmodo, Cheryl Eddy referred to the song as an "eternal tear-the-club-up fantasy jam". Ranking "Magic Dance" at number 3 on the list "The 10 Best Uses of David Bowie Songs in Movies", Screen Rant's Ben Sherlock considered it the best song from Labyrinth and wrote that it "still has the ability to reinvigorate a dying party more than 30 years later." Empire listed the song among the "catchiest earworms" from cinema.

Some critics have observed similarities between "Magic Dance" and Bowie's earlier song "The Laughing Gnome", as both are constructed around traditional nursery rhymes and feature comic goblin/gnome voices. Sasha Frere-Jones of the Los Angeles Times described the song as Bowie "essentially performing "The Laughing Gnome" again, except this time he and his gnomes come perilously close to rapping."

== Track listing ==
=== 12": EMI America / V-19217 (US) ===
1. "Magic Dance" (a dance mix) – 7:06
2. "Magic Dance" (dub) – 5:22
3. "Within You" – 3:28

=== Download: EMI / i19217 (US) ===
1. "Magic Dance" (single version/edit of 7" remix) – 4:00
2. "Magic Dance" (12" remix/dance mix) – 7:16
3. "Magic Dance" (dub) – 5:31
4. "Magic Dance" (7" remix) – 4:39

== Personnel ==
- David Bowie – vocals, backing vocals, producer
- Arif Mardin – producer
- Dann Huff – guitar
- Will Lee – additional bass, backing vocals
- Steve Ferrone – drums
- Robbie Buchanan – keyboards, synthesizer, arrangement
- Diva Gray – backing vocals
- Fonzi Thornton – backing vocals

== Charts and Certifications ==
=== Weekly charts ===
Chart (1986)	Peak position
New Zealand (Recorded Music NZ)	40

=== Certifications ===
Certifications for "Magic Dance"
Region	Certification	Certified units/sales
United Kingdom (BPI)	Silver	200,000^{‡}
^{^} Shipments figures based on certification alone.
