= A New Career in a New Town (1977–1982) =

2017 box set by David Bowie

Box set by David Bowie
- Released: 29 September 2017
- Recorded: December 1975 – September 1981
- Genres: Art rock; experimental rock; electronic; ambient; new wave
- Length: 450:08 (11 CDs / 13 LPs)
- Label: Parlophone
- Producer: Various

David Bowie chronology
Cracked Actor (Live Los Angeles '74) (2017)	A New Career in a New Town (1977–1982) (2017)	Welcome to the Blackout (Live London '78) (2018)

David Bowie box set chronology
Who Can I Be Now? (1974–1976) (2016)	A New Career in a New Town (1977–1982) (2017)	Loving the Alien (1983–1988) (2018)

Professional ratings
Aggregate scores
Source	Rating
Metacritic	85/100
Review scores
Source	Rating
AllMusic	4/5 stars
American Songwriter	4.5/5 stars
Classic Rock	4.5/5 stars
Rolling Stone	4.5/5 stars
Uncut	4.5/5 stars
Under the Radar	9.5/10

A New Career in a New Town (1977–1982) is a box set by English singer-songwriter David Bowie, released on 29 September 2017. A follow-up to the compilations Five Years (1969–1973) and Who Can I Be Now? (1974–1976), the set covers Bowie's career from 1977 to 1982, including his "Berlin Trilogy", over eleven compact discs or thirteen LPs.

== Overview ==
Exclusive to the box set are a "Heroes" EP, which compiles versions of his song "'Heroes'" recorded in different languages, a new version of Lodger (1979), remixed by coproducer Tony Visconti, and Re:Call 3, a compilation of non-album singles, single versions, and B-sides that serves as a sequel to Re:Call 1 from Five Years and Re:Call 2 from Who Can I Be Now? and features the Baal EP (1982) in its entirety on CD for the first time.

The box set also includes remastered editions of Low, "Heroes", Lodger (in the original mix), Stage (in original and 2017 versions), and Scary Monsters (And Super Creeps).

The set comes with a hardcover book with photographs by Anton Corbijn, Helmut Newton, Andrew Kent, Steve Schapiro, Duffy and many others, as well as historical press reviews and technical notes about the albums from producer Tony Visconti.

== Criticism ==
The box attracted criticism by fans and music reviewers, including Henry Rollins, as heavier changes to the music in the mixing and mastering process through Visconti became clear.

A volume shift in the song "'Heroes'" had received particular notice, which Parlophone proceeded to describe as intentional and unalterable, because of damages in the original master tapes. However, a statement was later released on the official Bowie website announcing corrected replacement discs for the "Heroes" CD and LP; the replacement disc offer lasted until June 2018. The amended remaster featured on the replacement discs was also used for the standalone CD and LP release of "Heroes" in early 2018.

== Track listing ==
=== Low (2017 remaster) ===
All tracks are written by David Bowie, except where noted.

Side one
No.	Title	Writer(s)	Length
1.	"Speed of Life"		2:47
2.	"Breaking Glass"	Bowie, Dennis Davis, George Murray	1:52
3.	"What in the World"		2:24
4.	"Sound and Vision"		3:03
5.	"Always Crashing in the Same Car"		3:35
6.	"Be My Wife"		2:56
7.	"A New Career in a New Town"		2:55
Total length:			19:32

Side two
No.	Title	Writer(s)	Length
8.	"Warszawa"	Bowie, Brian Eno	6:27
9.	"Art Decade"		3:48
10.	"Weeping Wall"		3:29
11.	"Subterraneans"		5:43
Total length:			19:27 (38:59)

=== "Heroes" (2017 remaster) ===
Side one
No.	Title	Writer(s)	Length
1.	"Beauty and the Beast"		3:36
2.	"Joe the Lion"		3:08
3.	"'Heroes'"	Bowie, Eno	6:11
4.	"Sons of the Silent Age"		3:20
5.	"Blackout"		3:49
Total length:			20:04

Side two
No.	Title	Writer(s)	Length
6.	"V-2 Schneider"		3:11
7.	"Sense of Doubt"		3:59
8.	"Moss Garden"	Bowie, Eno	5:05
9.	"Neuköln"	Bowie, Eno	4:34
10.	"The Secret Life of Arabia"	Bowie, Eno, Carlos Alomar	3:46
Total length:			20:35 (40:39)

=== "Heroes" EP ===
Side one
No.	Title	Writer(s)	Length
1.	"'Heroes'" / "'Helden'" (English/German album version)	Bowie, Eno	6:07
2.	"'Helden'" (German single version)	Bowie, Eno	3:38
Total length:			9:45

Side two
No.	Title	Writer(s)	Length
3.	"'Heroes'" / "'Héros'" (English/French album version)	Bowie, Eno	6:05
4.	"'Héros'" (French single version)	Bowie, Eno	3:33
Total length:			9:38 (19:23)

=== Stage (original version) (2017 remaster) ===
Side one
No.	Title	Length
1.	"Hang On to Yourself"	3:25
2.	"Ziggy Stardust"	3:33
3.	"Five Years"	3:57
4.	"Soul Love"	2:56
5.	"Star"	2:34
Total length:		16:25

Side two
No.	Title	Writer(s)	Length
6.	"Station to Station"		8:51
7.	"Fame"	Bowie, Alomar, John Lennon	4:08
8.	"TVC 15"		4:38
Total length:			17:37

Side three
No.	Title	Writer(s)	Length
9.	"Warszawa"	Bowie, Eno	6:53
10.	"Speed of Life"		2:44
11.	"Art Decade"		3:10
12.	"Sense of Doubt"		3:12
13.	"Breaking Glass"	Bowie, Davis, Murray	3:30
Total length:			19:29

Side four
No.	Title	Writer(s)	Length
14.	"'Heroes'"	Bowie, Eno	6:20
15.	"What in the World"		4:25
16.	"Blackout"		4:03
17.	"Beauty and the Beast"		5:11
Total length:			19:59 (73:30)

=== Stage (2017 version) ===
Side one
No.	Title	Writer(s)	Length
1.	"Warszawa"	Bowie, Eno	6:53
2.	"'Heroes'"	Bowie, Eno	6:19
3.	"What in the World"		4:25
Total length:			17:37

Side two
No.	Title	Length
4.	"Be My Wife"	2:49
5.	"The Jean Genie" (Previously unreleased)	6:17
6.	"Blackout"	4:00
7.	"Sense of Doubt"	3:07
Total length:		16:13

Side three
No.	Title	Writer(s)	Length
8.	"Speed of Life"		2:40
9.	"Breaking Glass"	Bowie, Davis, Murray	3:22
10.	"Beauty and the Beast"		5:06
11.	"Fame"	Bowie, Alomar, Lennon	4:13
Total length:			15:21

Side four
No.	Title	Length
12.	"Five Years"	3:57
13.	"Soul Love"	2:56
14.	"Star"	2:28
15.	"Hang On to Yourself"	3:22
16.	"Ziggy Stardust"	3:30
17.	"Suffragette City" (Previously unreleased)	3:58
Total length:		17:43

Side five
No.	Title	Writer(s)	Length
18.	"Art Decade"		3:01
19.	"Alabama Song"	Bertolt Brecht, Kurt Weill	3:55
20.	"Station to Station"		8:43
Total length:			15:39

Side 6
No.	Title	Length
21.	"Stay"	7:21
22.	"TVC 15"	4:36
Total length:		11:57 (94:30)

=== Lodger (2017 remaster) ===
Side one
No.	Title	Writer(s)	Length
1.	"Fantastic Voyage"	Bowie, Eno	2:55
2.	"African Night Flight"	Bowie, Eno	2:56
3.	"Move On"		3:20
4.	"Yassassin" (Turkish for: Long Live)		4:13
5.	"Red Sails"	Bowie, Eno	3:45
Total length:			17:09

Side two
No.	Title	Writer(s)	Length
6.	"DJ"	Bowie, Eno, Alomar	4:01
7.	"Look Back in Anger"	Bowie, Eno	3:08
8.	"Boys Keep Swinging"	Bowie, Eno	3:18
9.	"Repetition"		3:00
10.	"Red Money"	Bowie, Alomar	4:19
Total length:			17:46 (34:55)

=== Lodger (Tony Visconti 2017 mix) ===
Side one
No.	Title	Writer(s)	Length
1.	"Fantastic Voyage"	Bowie, Eno	2:53
2.	"African Night Flight"	Bowie, Eno	2:56
3.	"Move On"		3:24
4.	"Yassassin" (Turkish for: Long Live)		4:13
5.	"Red Sails"	Bowie, Eno	3:46
Total length:			17:12

Side two
No.	Title	Writer(s)	Length
6.	"DJ"	Bowie, Eno, Alomar	3:59
7.	"Look Back in Anger"	Bowie, Eno	3:09
8.	"Boys Keep Swinging"	Bowie, Eno	3:22
9.	"Repetition"		3:01
10.	"Red Money"	Bowie, Alomar	4:18
Total length:			17:49 (35:01)

=== Scary Monsters (and Super Creeps) (2017 remaster) ===
Side one
No.	Title	Length
1.	"It's No Game (No. 1)"	4:17
2.	"Up the Hill Backwards"	3:15
3.	"Scary Monsters (And Super Creeps)"	5:13
4.	"Ashes to Ashes"	4:26
5.	"Fashion"	4:50
Total length:		22:01

Side two
No.	Title	Writer(s)	Length
6.	"Teenage Wildlife"		6:58
7.	"Scream Like a Baby"		3:36
8.	"Kingdom Come"	Tom Verlaine	3:47
9.	"Because You're Young"		4:55
10.	"It's No Game (No. 2)"		4:26
Total length:			23:42 (45:43)

=== Re:Call 3 (remastered tracks) ===
Side one
No.	Title	Writer(s)	Length
1.	""Heroes"" (Single version)	Bowie, Eno	3:35
2.	"Beauty and the Beast" (Extended version)		5:20
3.	"Breaking Glass" (Australian single version)	Bowie, Davis, Murray	2:51
4.	"Yassassin" (Single version)		3:07
5.	"DJ" (Single version)	Bowie, Eno, Alomar	3:25
Total length:			18:18

Side two
No.	Title	Writer(s)	Length
6.	"Alabama Song"	Brecht, Weill	3:53
7.	"Space Oddity" (1979 version)		4:52
8.	"Ashes to Ashes" (Single version)		3:37
9.	"Fashion" (Single version)		3:24
10.	"Scary Monsters (And Super Creeps)" (Single version)		3:35
Total length:			19:21

Side three
No.	Title	Writer(s)	Length
11.	"Crystal Japan"		3:09
12.	"Under Pressure" (Single version) (Queen and David Bowie)	Freddie Mercury, Brian May, Roger Taylor, John Deacon, Bowie	4:08
13.	"Cat People (Putting Out Fire)" (Soundtrack album version)	Bowie, Giorgio Moroder	6:41
14.	"Peace on Earth/Little Drummer Boy" (David Bowie & Bing Crosby)	Ian Fraser, Larry Grossman, Alan Kohan / Harry Simeone, K.K. Davis, Henry Onorati	4:26
Total length:			18:24

Side four: Bertolt Brecht’s Baal
No.	Title	Writer(s)	Length
15.	"Baal’s Hymn"	Brecht, Dominic Muldowney	4:04
16.	"Remembering Marie A"	Traditional; adapted by Brecht and Muldowney	2:09
17.	"Ballad of the Adventurers"	Brecht, Muldowney	2:02
18.	"The Drowned Girl"	Brecht, Weill	2:31
19.	"The Dirty Song"	Brecht, Muldowney	0:39
Total length:			11:25 (67:28)

CD edition
No.	Title	Writer(s)	Length
1.	""Heroes"" (Single version)	Bowie, Eno	3:35
2.	"Beauty and the Beast"		5:20
3.	"Breaking Glass" (Australian single version)	Bowie, Davis, Murray	2:51
4.	"Yassassin" (Single version)		3:07
5.	"DJ" (Single version)	Bowie, Eno	3:25
6.	"Alabama Song"	Brecht, Weill	3:53
7.	"Space Oddity" (1979 version)		4:52
8.	"Ashes to Ashes" (Single version)		3:37
9.	"Fashion" (Single version)		3:24
10.	"Scary Monsters (And Super Creeps)" (single version)		3:35
11.	"Crystal Japan"		3:09
12.	"Under Pressure" (Single version) (Queen and David Bowie)	Mercury, Taylor, May, Deacon, Bowie	4:08
13.	"Baal's Hymn"	Brecht, Muldowney	4:04
14.	"Remembering Marie A"	Traditional; adapted by Brecht and Muldowney	2:09
15.	"Ballad of the Adventurers"	Brecht, Muldowney	2:02
16.	"The Drowned Girl"	Brecht, Weill	2:31
17.	"The Dirty Song"	Brecht, Muldowney	0:39
18.	"Cat People (Putting Out Fire)" (Soundtrack album version)	Bowie, Moroder	6:41
19.	"Peace on Earth/Little Drummer Boy" (David Bowie & Bing Crosby)	Fraser, Grossman, Kohan / Simeone, Davis, Onorati	4:26
Total length:			67:28

== Charts ==
Chart (2017)	Peak position
Austrian Albums (Ö3 Austria)	59
Belgian Albums (Ultratop Flanders)	41
Belgian Albums (Ultratop Wallonia)	61
Dutch Albums (Album Top 100)	76
French Albums (SNEP)	62
German Albums (Offizielle Top 100)	24
Irish Albums (IRMA)	59
Italian Albums (FIMI)	92
New Zealand Heatseekers Albums (RMNZ)	8
Scottish Albums (Official Charts)	18
Swedish Albums (Sverigetopplistan)	41
UK Albums (Official Charts)	19
US Billboard 200	151
US Top Alternative Albums (Billboard)	16
US Top Rock Albums (Billboard)	25
