= Sound and Vision =

1977 song by David Bowie

- US single

Single by David Bowie

from the album Low
- B-side: "A New Career in a New Town"
- Released: 11 February 1977
- Recorded: September–November 1976
- Studio: Château d'Hérouville (Hérouville); Hansa (West Berlin)
- Genre: Rock; pop (Note: Bowie's biographers consider "Sound and Vision" the closest to a "conventional pop song" on Low. Michael Gallucci of Ultimate Classic Rock describes it as a "traditional rock song" with "krautrock and electronic textures". Other reviewers have noted the presence of soul and disco.)
- Length: 3:00
- Label: RCA
- Songwriter: David Bowie
- Producers: David Bowie; Tony Visconti

David Bowie singles chronology
"Suffragette City" (1976)	"Sound and Vision" (1977)	"Be My Wife" (1977)

"Sound and Vision" is a song by the English musician David Bowie. It was released in January 1977 by RCA Records on side one of his 11th studio album Low. RCA later chose it as the first single from the album. Co-produced by Bowie and Tony Visconti, the song was recorded at the Château d'Hérouville in Hérouville, France, in September 1976, and completed at Hansa Studios in West Berlin in October and November. The song began as a simple G major chord progression that Bowie gave to the backing musicians, writing and recording his vocals afterward. It features backing vocals from Brian Eno and Visconti's then-wife Mary Hopkin.

Regarded by biographers as the closest to a "conventional pop song" on Low, "Sound and Vision" is oddly structured. Beginning as an instrumental, elements are added throughout the song's runtime; Bowie's vocals do not appear for over a minute and a half. The song's lyrics are dark and introspective, reflecting Bowie's mental state after years of drug addiction, and provide a stark contrast to the music itself, which is more joyous and upbeat. Like other Low tracks, the song's drum sound was achieved through the use of Visconti's Eventide H910 Harmonizer.

Released as a single on 11 February 1977, "Sound and Vision" was a commercial success, making number three on the UK Singles Chart, aided by its appearance in BBC television commercials. It peaked at number 69 on the Billboard Hot 100, signalling Bowie's commercial downturn in the US until 1983. Music critics and biographers consider "Sound and Vision" one of Bowie's greatest songs. He performed it only once on his 1978 Isolar II world tour, but frequently on later tours. Remixes of the song have been created in subsequent decades and it has appeared on several compilation albums.

== Writing and recording ==
Like its parent album Low, "Sound and Vision" was co-produced by David Bowie and Tony Visconti, with contributions from multi-instrumentalist Brian Eno. The backing tracks were recorded at the Château d'Hérouville in Hérouville, France, in September 1976, and Bowie's vocals and other overdubs were recorded at Hansa Studios in West Berlin in October and November. It was the first song Bowie wrote at the Château with Eno in mind. The recording process for the song, and the rest of the album, differed from Bowie's previous work. The backing tracks were recorded first, followed by overdubs, and the lyrics and vocals were written and recorded last. Used during the recording of Iggy Pop's The Idiot earlier that year, Bowie heavily favoured this "three-phase" process, which he would use for the rest of his career.

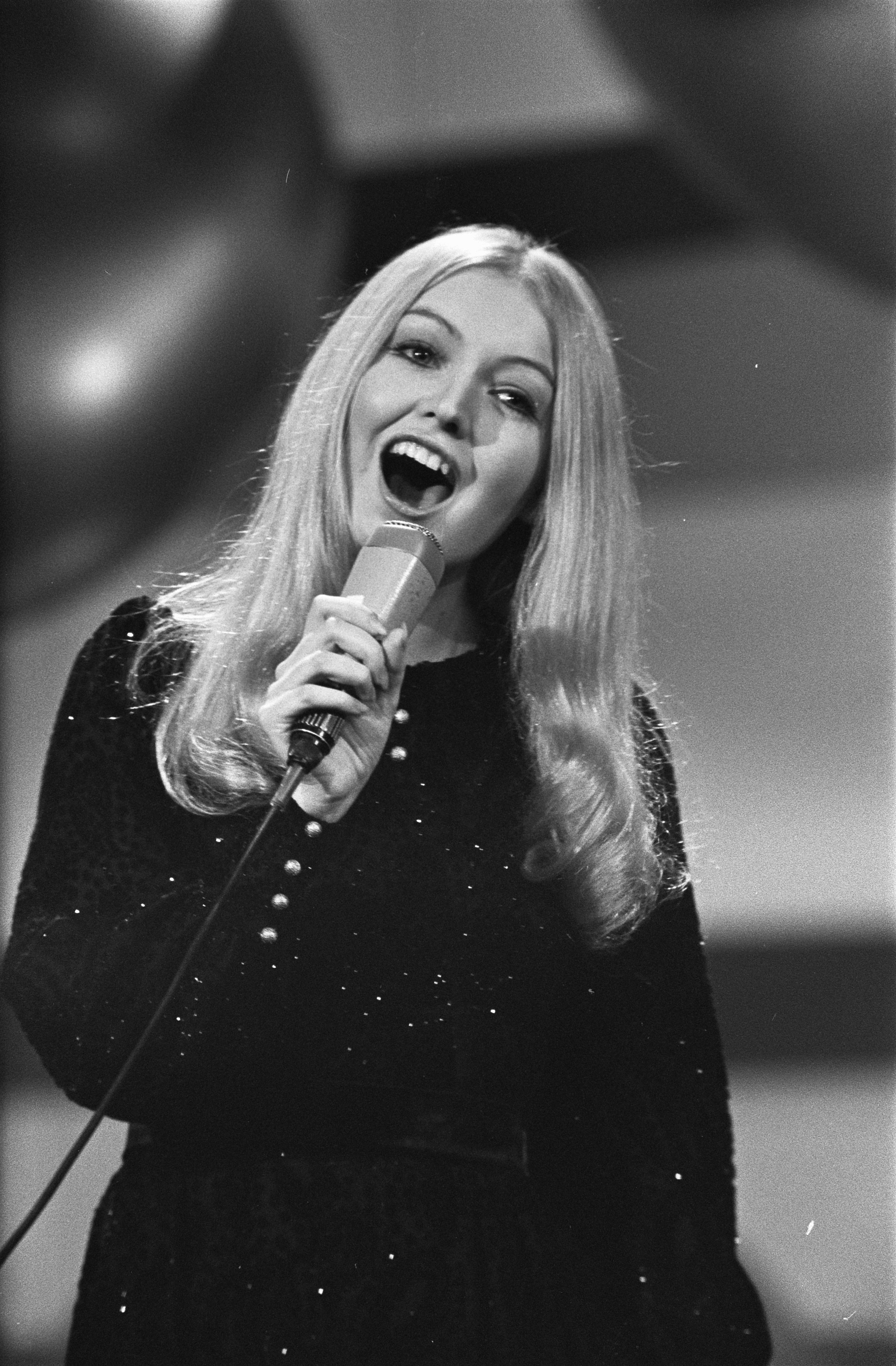
"Sound and Vision" contains backing vocals from Visconti's then-wife Mary Hopkin (pictured in 1970).

According to biographer Chris O'Leary, the song began as a simple descending-by-fifths G major progression that Bowie gave to the band, suggesting further melodies, a baseline and drum ideas. Drummer Dennis Davis thought it sounded "like a Crusaders tune", while bassist George Murray found it reminiscent of Bo Diddley. As with most of the tracks on the album, the band went with the basic idea and finished the backing track in a few takes. The song was largely completed without Eno, who arrived late in the sessions after all the backing tracks for side one were almost finished. The drums on "Sound and Vision" were treated through the use of an Eventide H910 Harmonizer, used at Visconti's insistence. The sound, described by biographer David Buckley as "revolutionary" and "stunning", is particularly evident on the album tracks "Speed of Life" and "Breaking Glass", as well as "Sound and Vision".

Visconti's wife, singer Mary Hopkin, contributed the song's backing vocals; she was credited as Mary Visconti. Hopkin was visiting the Château with her children when Eno asked her to sing. She recorded her vocals before any lyrics or melody were written, recalling in 2011:

One evening, Brian called me into the studio to sing a quick backing vocal with him on 'Sound and Vision'. We sang his cute little 'doo doo' riff in unison. It was meant to be a distant echo but, when David heard it, he pushed up the fader until it became a prominent vocal – much to my embarrassment, as I thought it very twee. I love the song and I'm a great admirer of David's work.

== Composition ==
["Sound and Vision" is] a very sad song for me ... I was trying very hard to drag myself out of an awful period of my life. I was locked in a room in Berlin telling myself I was going to straighten up and not do drugs anymore. I was never going to drink again. Only some of it proved to be the case. It was the first time I knew I was killing myself and time to do something about my physical condition.

— David Bowie, 2003

Like the majority of the tracks on the first side of Low, "Sound and Vision" is classified as a "song fragment". Structurally, it starts as an instrumental, running for 46 seconds before backing vocals croon two descending notes. At 1:14, Eno and Hopkin sing their vocal line, which echoes the main guitar line, followed by a darker saxophone part played by Bowie. Bowie's vocals take a full 1 minute and 30 seconds to appear, which was done at Eno's insistence to "confound listener expectations". Different elements build throughout the song's runtime: the beginning only contains the rhythm section, which is followed by a mock-string section created using an ARP Solina synthesiser, then backing vocals, brass and finally Bowie's vocal.

Described by Bowie as his "ultimate retreat song", the lyrics for "Sound and Vision" offer introspection, reflecting his mental state following a long period of drug addiction. The song's narrator sits in an empty room and draws the blinds. As he has the world shut away, he waits "for the gift of sound and vision". Bowie further commented: "It was just the idea of getting out of America, that depressing era I was going through. ... It was wanting to be put in a little cold room with omnipotent blue on the walls and blinds on the windows." Wilcken calls "Sound and Vision" the centrepiece of side one. It continues the lyrical themes of "Breaking Glass" and "What in the World", in that "after failing to connect with female others", the narrator focuses on the self and by "drifting into my solitude", sets the stage for the wordless introspection of side two. Biographer Nicholas Pegg and author Peter Doggett make comparisons to Bowie's 1971 song "Quicksand". Doggett writes: "Like 'Quicksand', 'Sound and Vision' was Bowie's admission that his creative inspiration had disappeared: cunningly, he used a confession of artistic bankruptcy to spark his muse back to life." According to Visconti, there were originally more verses, but these were removed during the mixing stage.

Sample from "Sound and Vision"
As well as illustrating the album's unique drum sound, this sample showcases "Sound and Vision"'s contrasting musical and lyrical qualities. While the music is more joyous and upbeat, the lyrics are more downbeat, reflecting Bowie's mental state at the time.

The lyrics provide a stark contrast to the music itself, which is more joyous. Author Thomas Jerome Seabrook writes that Bowie's "low, reflective [vocal is] at odds with the upbeat, almost parodic sensibilities of the music that surrounds it". The song is in the key of G major. James Perone describes its chord progression as "I (G major), ii (A minor), V (D major), I (G major)". He notes that this progression evokes classical music with a harmonic quality. Almost every instrument playing on the song sounds processed. O'Leary compares the drums to the sound of a radiator turning on; Seabrook finds it similar to a whip. The bass is distorted while the piano and mock-string section are engulfed with studio effects; Seabrook further believes the saxophone sounds as if it was treated by Visconti's Harmonizer. Throughout the song, a sizzle cymbal appears on the third beat of almost every bar and two guitars are panned to different channels, the main guitar line appearing in the left, and a "mock-reggae rhythm" appearing in the right.

Bowie's biographers consider "Sound and Vision" the closest to a "conventional pop song" on Low. Wilcken writes that the track's instrumentation and backing vocals combine to create a "sonic effect" that equals that of a "pop song with quotation marks, not quite sure whether it's a part of the genre or referencing it". Perone finds the song a "hybrid of soul and pop", continuing musical and lyrical themes of Bowie's 1975 album Young Americans. Michael Gallucci of Ultimate Classic Rock describes a sense of "pop minimalism" on "Sound and Vision" and "Be My Wife" that showed Bowie entering a new phase of his career. He further considered the song the best example of its parent album's embracement of the old and new, calling it "a traditional rock song at its core wrapped in krautrock and electronic textures". In ZigZag magazine, Kris Needs described the song's beat as "bouncy, futuristic disco". Doggett calls it a "consummate pop record, as tightly produced as any disco classic of the era".

== Release ==
When Bowie presented his 11th studio album Low to RCA Records, the label were shocked. The album was originally slated for release in November 1976, but RCA delayed it until January 1977, fearing poor commercial performance. Despite receiving no promotion from Bowie or his label, Low was a commercial success, peaking at number 2 on the UK Albums Chart and number 11 on the US Billboard Top LPs & Tape chart. "Sound and Vision" was sequenced as the fourth track on side one, between "What in the World" and "Always Crashing in the Same Car".

At the time of release, Tim Lott of Sounds magazine felt that none of the tracks were "single material". Bud Scoppa of Phonograph Record magazine considered "Sound and Vision" the "obvious" choice. RCA selected "Sound and Vision" as the first single from the album, releasing it on 11 February 1977, with the catalogue number PB 0905 and the instrumental "A New Career in a New Town" as the B-side. A 12" promotional single was also released in the US the same year, featuring a seven-minute remix of "Sound and Vision" segueing into Iggy Pop's "Sister Midnight".

The single was used by the BBC for television trailers at the time. This provided considerable exposure, and helped the song peak at number three on the UK Singles Chart, becoming Bowie's highest-charting new single in the UK since "Sorrow" in 1973. The single's success in the UK confused RCA executives, and allowed Bowie to persuade them to release Iggy Pop's The Idiot, which they did in March 1977. The song was also a top 10 hit in Belgium Flanders, West Germany, the Netherlands and New Zealand, and a top 20 hit in Austria and Belgium Wallonia. It stalled at number 74 in Australia, number 87 on Canada's RPM Singles chart and only peaked at number 69 on the Billboard Hot 100 in the US, signalling Bowie's commercial downturn until "Let's Dance" in 1983. In 2021, the British Phonographic Industry (BPI) certified the song silver for sales and streams exceeding 200,000 units in the UK.

== Critical reception ==
On release, Lott reviewed Low and described "Sound and Vision" as the centrepiece of the album. Calling it "metallic beauty", he praised Bowie's vocal performance, stating: "His singing, as always, is more mechanical than melodic, but in context, the perfect foil for the harsh guitar and sliding synthesiser." In the Los Angeles Times, Robert Hilburn called the song "sensational" and praised its uncommercial nature following Bowie's previous singles. Doggett calls "Sound and Vision" "arguably one of the most important songs [Bowie] had ever written," because the song allowed Bowie to reconnect with himself after a long period of drug addiction. Pegg regards it as "one of his most distinctive and brilliant recordings". NME ranked it the 29th best song of the year in 1977.

"Sound and Vision" has been ranked one of Bowie's best songs by several publications. Following Bowie's death in 2016, the writers at Rolling Stone ranked "Sound and Vision" one of Bowie's 30 essential songs, noting that although Low garnered mixed reception on release, releasing "Sound and Vision" as the lead single was "genius" owing to the song's "clever bait-and-switch". The same year, in a list ranking every Bowie single from worst to best, Ultimate Classic Rock placed "Sound and Vision" at number nine. In lists of Bowie's best songs by Consequence of Sound, Smooth Radio and Uncut, the song was voted numbers 22, 10 and 15, respectively. In 2018, readers of NME voted "Sound and Vision" Bowie's 19th best song, while staff-writer Emily Barker voted it Bowie's second best song, behind "'Heroes'". Mojo magazine ranked it number four in 2015, behind "Life on Mars?", "'Heroes'" and "Starman".

In 2020, Alexis Petridis of The Guardian called "Sound and Vision" Bowie's greatest song, finding it "both a fantastic pop song and an act of artistic daring" and a track that "transcends time"; he concluded that it was: "Completely original, nothing about its sound tethers it to the mid-70s. Its magic seems to sum Bowie up." A year later, writers of The Telegraph voted it Bowie's 12th greatest song, writing: "A punch of a song at the start of Low, it showed Bowie entering a new, dispassionate style which would divide his listeners but, with its liberal use of synthesisers, also cement his status as a trailblazer of the electronica."

== Live versions and subsequent releases ==
"Sound and Vision" was only performed once during the 1978 Isolar II world tour, at Earl's Court in London, on 1 July 1978. According to Seabrook, this was because Bowie struggled to sing it, a problem he also had with "Golden Years". This performance was included on Rarestonebowie (1995), a compilation compiled by Bowie's former music publisher MainMan, and decades later on the live album Welcome to the Blackout (Live London '78) (2018). Bowie also performed the song during the Sound+Vision (1990), Heathen (2002), and A Reality (2003) tours, and was also performed on A&E's Live by Request on 15 June 2002.

The song has since appeared on several compilations, including The Best of Bowie (1980), Changestwobowie (1981), Sound + Vision (1989), Changesbowie (EMI LP and cassette versions) (1990), The Singles Collection and Bowie: The Singles 1969–1993 (both 1993), The Best of David Bowie 1974/1979 (1998), Best of Bowie (2002), The Platinum Collection (2006), Nothing Has Changed (2014), and Bowie Legacy (2016). The song, along with the rest of its parent album, was remastered in 2017 for Parlophone's A New Career in a New Town (1977–1982) box set. The 1991 reissue of Low featured a new remix of "Sound and Vision" by producer David Richards, Bowie's Never Let Me Down collaborator. Pegg writes that it contains an "unpleasant honking saxophone" that he feels "disrupts the original's textured atmospherics". This remix and two additional remixes were released as a single in the US by 808 State; it was credited to "David Bowie vs 808 State" and were subsequently released as an EP download in 2010. Another stripped-down remix was created by Sonjay Prabhakar in 2013 for a Sony commercial. Titled "Sound and Vision 2013", interest from Bowie fans led to its inclusion on a CD-R promo. An extended version of the remix was released later the same year. Ultimate Classic Rock placed "Sound and Vision 2013" at number 117 (out of 119) in a list ranking every Bowie single from worst to best.

== Cover versions and media appearances ==
Artists who have covered "Sound and Vision" include Scottish rock band Franz Ferdinand, American indie rock band the Sea and Cake, English singer-songwriter Anna Calvi, and American singer-songwriter Beck, whose version included a 157-piece orchestra. Franz Ferdinand's Alex Kapranos recalled that the band were asked to cover a song from 1977 for BBC Radio 1 and chose "Sound and Vision" as it was his favourite song from that year, particularly due to the song's unique structure and unpredictability: "You feel like the song is playing for eternity in some other universe. It's like you caught a snippet of something that will always be playing." Bowie's original recording appeared in the 1993 television serial The Buddha of Suburbia, and an excerpt appeared in the Off-Broadway musical Lazarus. According to Pegg, instead of performing the song live in the musical, an excerpt from the original was used in order to "underscore a particularly dramatic moment". Hopkin's backing vocal was echoed in the British rock band Doves' 2002 single "There Goes the Fear".

== Track listing ==
All tracks are written by David Bowie.

Original 7" single

1. "Sound and Vision" – 3:00
2. "A New Career in a New Town" – 2:50

David Bowie vs 808 State (1991)

1. "Sound + Vision (808 Gift mix)" – 3:58
2. "Sound + Vision (808 'lectric Blue remix instrumental)" – 4:08
3. "Sound + Vision (David Richards remix 1991)" – 4:40
4. "Sound + Vision (Original version)" – 3:03

David Bowie – "Sound and Vision (2013)"

1. "Sound and Vision 2013" – 1:50
2. "Sound and Vision (Remastered)" – 3:04

== Personnel ==
According to Chris O'Leary and Benoît Clerc:

- David Bowie – lead and backing vocals, baritone saxophone, Chamberlin and/or ARP Solina ("synthetic strings")
- Ricky Gardiner – lead guitar
- Carlos Alomar – rhythm guitar
- George Murray – bass
- Roy Young – piano
- Dennis Davis – drums
- Brian Eno – piano, backing vocals
- Mary Visconti – backing vocals

Production

- David Bowie – producer
- Tony Visconti – producer, engineer
- Laurent Thibault – engineer (Château d'Hérouville)
- Eduard Meyer – engineer (Hansa Studios)

== Charts ==
=== Weekly charts ===
Weekly chart performance for "Sound and Vision"
Chart (1977-2013)	Peak position
Australian Top 100 (Kent Music Report)	74
Austria (Ö3 Austria Top 40)	15
Belgium (Ultratop 50 Flanders)	3
Belgium (Ultratop 50 Wallonia)	11
Canadian Singles (RPM)	87
Ireland (IRMA)	85
Netherlands (Dutch Top 40)	2
Netherlands (Single Top 100)	2
New Zealand (Recorded Music NZ)	7
UK Singles (Official Charts)	3
US Billboard Hot 100	69
West Germany (Official German Charts)	6

=== Year-end charts ===
1977 year-end chart performance for "Sound and Vision"
Chart (1977)	Position
Belgium (Ultratop Flanders)	18
Netherlands (Dutch Top 40)	14
Netherlands (Single Top 100)	14
West Germany (Official German Charts)	42

== Certifications ==
Sales certifications for "Sound and Vision"
Region	Certification	Certified units/sales
New Zealand (RMNZ)	Gold	15,000^{‡}
United Kingdom (BPI)	Gold	400,000^{‡}
^{‡} Sales+streaming figures based on certification alone.
