= Beauty and the Beast (David Bowie song) =

Song by David Bowie

Single by David Bowie

from the album "Heroes"
- B-side: "Sense of Doubt"
- Released: 6 January 1978
- Recorded: July–August 1977
- Studio: Hansa Studio by the Wall, West Berlin
- Genre: Art rock; dance-rock
- Length: 3:32; 5:18 (12" extended version)
- Label: RCA
- Songwriter: David Bowie
- Producers: David Bowie; Tony Visconti

David Bowie singles chronology
"'Heroes'" (1977)	"Beauty and the Beast" (1978)	"Breaking Glass" (1978)

"Beauty and the Beast" is a song by the English musician David Bowie, released as the first track on his 1977 album "Heroes". It was issued as the second single from the album in January 1978, becoming a minor UK hit, peaking at No. 39 on the UK Singles Chart.

== Music and lyrics ==
The opening music, a disjointed combination of piano, guitar, electronics and voice rising in a steady crescendo, has been described as sounding like "Bowie is about to turn into The Incredible Hulk before your very ears". The song proper features Robert Fripp on lead guitar, with treatments and synthesizer work by Brian Eno. Fripp has stated that his guitar work on the track is a first take made straight upon arrival at the studio.

The lyrics have been interpreted as a look back at Bowie's severe mood swings during his cocaine addiction while living in Los Angeles from 1975 to 1976, with the line "Thank God Heaven left us standing on our feet" suggesting the singer's gratitude for making it through that period. The phrase "someone fetch a priest" alludes not to a desire for religious succour but to co-producer Tony Visconti's frequent expletive during the recording sessions for "Heroes", "someone fuck a priest".

In another interpretation, James E. Perone wrote:

"Beauty and the Beast" is one of those David Bowie songs with lyrics that can leave the listener scratching his or her head and wondering just what they mean. Bowie establishes a basic of feeling of evil in the air through his impressionistic and non-linear lyrics. Bowie's references allow the listener to read the Beauty and the Beast characters two possible ways. Either they are two entities, or perhaps, two sides of a single entity. In either case, the fact remains that the dark side—which Bowie paints as unavoidable—rules the situation he constructs. The listener must keep in mind that Bowie has created images based on the good–evil dialectic throughout his career: it is not unique to "Beauty and the Beast". However, it is interesting to consider the possible influence of Berlin on Bowie at this point in his career. Certainly, the East Berlin–West Berlin, Communism–Democracy dialectics fit conveniently in the listener's possible understanding of the song.

== Release and aftermath ==
The follow-up single to "Heroes", "Beauty and the Beast" was considered an unconventional choice for release, and it just scraped into the UK Top 40. NME editors Roy Carr and Charles Shaar Murray remarked that its "jarring, threatening edge (and it was one of the most menacing singles of a menacing year) obviously put off a great many of the floating singles buyers attracted by the intoxicating romanticism of its immediate predecessor". The US release failed to chart, despite being augmented by a promo 12" single featuring Bowie's earlier US No. 1 hit "Fame" on the B-side.

Bowie performed the song live only on his Isolar II Tour, with a version appearing on Stage.

== Track listing ==
=== 7" single ===
1. "Beauty and the Beast" (David Bowie) – 3:32
2. "Sense of Doubt" (Bowie) – 3:57

=== 12" single ===
1. "Beauty and the Beast (Special Extended Version)" (Bowie) – 5:18
2. "Fame" (Bowie, John Lennon, Carlos Alomar) – 3:30
- 12" was only released in US (as a 12" Promo) and Spain.

== Personnel ==
- David Bowie – vocals, piano, production
- Robert Fripp – lead guitar
- Carlos Alomar – rhythm guitar
- George Murray – bass guitar
- Dennis Davis – drums
- Brian Eno – synthesizer, guitar treatments
- Antonia Maass – backing vocals
- Tony Visconti – production

== Live versions ==
- Performances from the Isolar II Tour have been released on Stage (1978) and Welcome to the Blackout (2018).

== Cover versions ==
- The song was covered by the now-defunct Christian heavy metal band Deliverance on the album Camelot-in-Smithereens (1995).
- Shearwater – as part of a live performance of the entire Berlin Trilogy for WNYC (2018)

== Other releases ==
- The song appeared on the following compilations:
  - Chameleon (Australia and New Zealand 1979)
  - The Singles Collection (1993)
  - The Best of David Bowie 1974/1979 (1998)
  - The Collection (2005)
  - The Platinum Collection (2005/2006)
- It was released as a picture disc in the RCA Life Time picture disc set.
- The extended version of the song, previously available only on a US 12" promo single and as a limited 12" single release in Spain, was released for the first time in digital and CD formats on Re:Call 3, part of the A New Career in a New Town (1977–1982) box set (2017).
