= TVC 15 =

1976 song by David Bowie

- US 12" single

Single by David Bowie

from the album Station to Station
- B-side: "We Are the Dead"
- Released: 30 April 1976
- Recorded: September–November 1975
- Studio: Cherokee, Los Angeles
- Genre: Art rock
- Length: 5:33 (album version); 3:43 (single version)
- Label: RCA
- Songwriter: David Bowie
- Producers: David Bowie; Harry Maslin

David Bowie singles chronology
"Golden Years" (1976)	"TVC 15" (1976)	"Stay" (1976)

"TVC 15" ("one five") is a song by the English musician David Bowie, released on his 1976 album Station to Station. RCA Records later released it as the second single from the album on 30 April 1976. The song was recorded in late 1975 at Cherokee Studios in Los Angeles. Co-produced by Bowie and Harry Maslin, the recording featured guitarists Carlos Alomar and Earl Slick, bassist George Murray, drummer Dennis Davis, pianist Roy Bittan and Warren Peace on backing vocals. The upbeat song is mostly art rock performed in a style reminiscent of the 1950s. Lyrically, the song concerns a character's girlfriend being eaten by a television set. It was inspired by a dream of Iggy Pop's and Bowie's role in The Man Who Fell to Earth (1976). Some lyrics are also influenced by the Yardbirds and Kraftwerk.

Upon release as a single, "TVC 15" peaked at number 33 on the UK Singles Chart and number 64 on the Billboard Hot 100 chart. Its release coincided with the European leg of the Isolar tour. Initial reviews praised the song as one of the album's highlights, although some reviewers found the lyrics difficult to comprehend. Later reviews continue to praise the song, with some considering it one of Bowie's best. It has appeared on several compilation albums and was remixed by Maslin in 2010 for reissues of Station to Station and remastered in 2016 for the Who Can I Be Now? (1974–1976) box set.

== Recording ==
After completing his work on The Man Who Fell to Earth in September 1975, David Bowie returned to Los Angeles to begin recording his next album. Personnel-wise, Bowie brought back the same team used for "Fame": co-producer Harry Maslin, guitarists Carlos Alomar and Earl Slick, drummer Dennis Davis and Bowie's old friend Geoff MacCormick (credited as Warren Peace), while bassist George Murray was recruited to play bass; pianist Roy Bittan, a member of Bruce Springsteen's E Street Band, joined the sessions in mid-October. For the studio, Bowie and Maslin chose Los Angeles's Cherokee Studios, which featured five different studio rooms, 24-track mixing consoles, 24-hour session times, and a lounge bar.

Recording for the new album began in late September 1975 and ended in late November. Recording for "TVC 15" began shortly after the completion of "Golden Years". Like the majority of the album, the song's elements were primarily built in the studio rather than written before. According to biographer Chris O'Leary, the dual guitars on "TVC 15" "out-grew" the 24-track mixing console, requiring Maslin to "keep bouncing down guitar and vocal dubs". Bowie later remembered almost nothing of the album's production, due to his heavy cocaine use during the sessions.

== Composition ==
Musically, "TVC 15" is described as art rock, while O'Leary calls it an "avant-garde novelty song". The writers of Rolling Stone later found the track to be a mix of new wave and boogie-woogie. According to David Buckley, it is the most upbeat track on the album. James Perone notes the music as " a pseudo-late-1950s style", comparing it to the sound of the American group Sha Na Na. NME editors Roy Carr and Charles Shaar Murray, who call the track "incongruously jolly", note an influence of the Yardbirds, as evident by the opening "oh-OH-oh-OH-OH", which is borrowed from the Yardbirds' 1964 song "Good Morning Little School Girl". O'Leary describes the "Oh my TVC 15" refrain as "half-mantra, half-jingle". Music critic Robert Christgau noted the track's "spaceyness" and blend of "Lou Reed, disco, and Dr. John", while Ultimate Classic Rock's Michael Gallucci found influences of krautrock.

The song is primarily in the key of C major, featuring a blues-style chord progression in the verses, with an additional F minor sprinkled throughout. The bridges are in F7/A7, containing a Kraftwerk-inspired sequence of "trans-sition" and "trans-mission" lines. These are undercut by Alomar plucking on his guitar's B string. Alomar described his and Slick's guitars as "drones": "The music would stay in one place and just keep going." Alomar later revealed that Bowie "really wanted [the nature of the track] fucked up like when we did [the Lodger track] 'Boys Keep Swinging', kind of loose and stupid. But then when it got to the end, he really wanted it to drive home." Perone notes that the guitars during the ending section move into late-1970s hard rock territory, while simultaneously including a "rhythmic stumble that suggests changing meters", which he believes provides a direct musical link to the album's title track.

Lyrically, Pegg calls "TVC 15" the album's "odd man out". Described by multiple commentators as a "surreal comedy", the song concerns a character's girlfriend being eaten by a television set. (Note: O'Leary identifies the narrator's girlfriend as the same girl from "Life on Mars? or "Unwashed and Somewhat Slightly Dazed".) The narrator mourns her ("My baby's in there someplace") and is left staring at the TVC 15; he knows the only way he and his girlfriend will reunite is if he ventures into the set. The subject matter was inspired by a dream of Iggy Pop's featuring a similar premise, as well as a scene in The Man Who Fell to Earth in which Bowie's character, Thomas Jerome Newton, fills a room with television screens, each tuned to a different channel. The song also contains religious themes, which are prevalent on numerous Station to Station tracks. Writing for the Spin Alternative Record Guide, Rob Sheffield interpreted "TVC 15" as "Major Tom appear[ing] as a woman who beams herself to a satellite, leaving poor David stranded on earth."

== Release ==
RCA released Station to Station on 23 January 1976, with "TVC 15" sequenced as the first track on side two of the original LP. It was released in edited form as the second single from the album on 30 April 1976, with the Diamond Dogs track "We Are the Dead" as the B-side and the catalogue number RCA 2682. Its release coincided with the European leg of the Isolar tour. It peaked at number 33 on the UK Singles Chart and number 64 on the Billboard Hot 100 chart. The song was also a top 20 hit in Sweden. Pegg notes that the same year Bowie recorded "TVC 15", Helen Reddy topped the US charts with the single "Angie Baby", which featured a similar premise to "TVC 15", where a boy is devoured by a transistor radio.

"TVC 15" was performed throughout the Isolar, 1978 Isolar II, 1983 Serious Moonlight and 1990 Sound+Vision tours. A performance from the first Isolar tour was included on Live Nassau Coliseum '76 (2017), while performances from the Isolar II tour have appeared on Stage (1978) and Welcome to the Blackout (2018). The song was also a part of Bowie's set during an appearance on Saturday Night Live in December 1979. For this performance, Bowie wore a what O'Leary calls a "pencil skirt" with high heels while a "stuffed pink poodle" held a television screen in its mouth; he was joined on stage by Klaus Nomi and Joey Arias. Years later, Bowie performed the song at Live Aid in 1985. This performance featured saxophone by Clare Hurst and piano by Thomas Dolby. AllMusic's Dave Thompson found Bowie's choice to play the song as a "far cry" from the mostly greatest hits setlists of other performers at the event.

== Reception ==
"TVC 15" received very positive reviews from music critics on release, including from Ian MacDonald, who called it an "objective masterpiece" in Street Life magazine. Reviewing the record for The Village Voice, Christgau expressed some reservations about the length of the songs and the detached quality of Bowie's vocals, but deemed "TVC 15" his "favorite piece of rock and roll in a very long time" and wrote, "spaceyness has always been his shtick, and anybody who can merge Lou Reed, disco, and Dr. John ... deserves to keep doing it for five minutes and 29 seconds." Meanwhile, John Ingham of Sounds magazine gave immense praise to Station to Station, naming "Golden Years", "TVC 15" and "Stay" some of Bowie's best songs up to that point. Ingham found the lyrics difficult to comprehend, including on "TVC 15", but felt that adds to the track's overall charm. Cash Box said that "the music is exuberant ragtime rock, filled with hooks and that "Bowie's voice is in excellent form, and he really pushes himself." As Station to Station was Bowie's first album not to include a lyric sheet in its packaging, its absence was felt by Teri Moris of Rolling Stone when listening to "TVC 15".

"TVC 15" has continued to be viewed in a positive light, with Spin magazine calling it one of the album's highlights. Consequence of Sound's Frank Mojica stated that although it gives the impression of being a "straightforward piano-rocker" at its start, by its end it becomes the album's "most compelling song after the title track". Mojo magazine later listed it as Bowie's 15th greatest song in 2015. Following Bowie's death, Rolling Stone named it one of the 30 most essential songs of Bowie's catalogue, calling it the "catchiest tune" on Station to Station. In a 2016 list ranking every Bowie single from worst to best, Ultimate Classic Rock placed "TVC 15" at number 12.

== Subsequent releases ==
"TVC 15" has appeared on several compilation albums. The single edit has featured on The Best of Bowie (1980), The Singles Collection (1993), The Best of David Bowie 1974/1979 (1998), and Best of Bowie (2002); the full-length album version appears on Fame and Fashion (1984) and the Sound + Vision box set (1989). The single edit also appeared on the Christiane F. soundtrack in 1981.

Station to Station was reissued in 2010 and released in different special and deluxe editions. Included in both editions was a new stereo mix of the album created by co-producer Maslin. In The Complete David Bowie, Pegg is critical of Maslin's remix. He writes that it "surrenders all the subtlety of the original [mix] in favour of unimaginatively pushing everything to the front", resulting in a "messy racket", particularly evident in the backing vocals for "TVC 15".

The song was remastered in 2016, along with its parent album, for the Who Can I Be Now? (1974–1976) box set, with a standalone album release the following year. Both the original mix and 2010 Maslin mix were included, and the single edit appeared on Re:Call 2, part of that set.

== Personnel ==
According to biographer Chris O'Leary:

- David Bowie – lead and backing vocals, saxophone
- Warren Peace – backing vocals
- Carlos Alomar – lead and rhythm guitar
- Earl Slick – lead and rhythm guitar
- George Murray – bass
- Dennis Davis – drums
- Roy Bittan – piano

Production

- David Bowie – producer
- Harry Maslin – producer

== Charts ==
Chart performance for "TVC 15"
Chart (1976)	Peak position
Sweden (Sverigetopplistan)	18
UK Singles (OCC)	33
US Billboard Hot 100	64
