= Isolar II – The 1978 World Tour =

1978 concert tour by David Bowie

- Tour by David Bowie
- Poster to the concerts in Belgium. A similar layout was used for other concert posters.
- Location: North America; Europe; Oceania; Asia
- Associated albums: Low; "Heroes"
- Start date: 29 March 1978
- End date: 12 December 1978
- Legs: 4
- No. of shows: 78

David Bowie concert chronology
- Isolar – 1976 Tour (1976); Isolar II – The 1978 World Tour (1978); Serious Moonlight Tour (1983)

The Isolar II – The 1978 World Tour, more commonly known as The Low / Heroes World Tour or The Stage Tour, was a worldwide concert tour by the English singer-songwriter David Bowie. The tour opened on 29 March 1978 at the San Diego Sports Arena, continuing through North America, Europe and Australia, before concluding at the Nippon Budokan in Japan on 12 December 1978. The personnel for the tour included Bowie's backing ensemble from previous albums – Carlos Alomar, George Murray and Dennis Davis, along with Roger Powell, Sean Mayes, Adrian Belew and Simon House.

For the tour, Bowie wore costumes designed by Natasha Kornilof, including tight shirts, baggy trousers and sailor hats. The tour's stage dressing was a modified version of the 1976 Isolar tour, featuring large panels of coloured, striped lights on the walls and ceiling that would pulse with the music. Songs performed were mostly from Bowie's recent records Low and "Heroes" (both 1977), along with seven songs from Ziggy Stardust (1972).

The tour was a critical and commercial success. Live recordings were released on the live albums Stage (1978) and Welcome to the Blackout (Live London '78) (2018). The performances at Earl's Court in London were filmed by David Hemmings, and the footage went unreleased due to Bowie's dissatisfaction with it. In 2026, it was announced that the original film, remastered by Brett Morgen, would be released in arenas in 2027.

== Overview ==
=== Development and personnel ===
Rehearsals for the tour began in March 1978, after Bowie finished filming Just a Gigolo. Originally, Brian Eno planned to join the tour band, but had to drop out for health reasons. With Eno out and Robert Fripp declining to tour, Bowie hired four new players: Roger Powell on synthesisers, Sean Mayes on piano, Adrian Belew on guitar and Simon House on violin. Guitarist Carlos Alomar, bassist George Murray and drummer Dennis Davis returned from Bowie's preceding albums; Alomar acted as band leader and drove the rehearsals, which lasted only two weeks; Bowie was initially absent as he went on holiday to Kenya to celebrate the completion of Just a Gigolo. Mayes later remarked that "Anyone watching would think [Alomar] was in charge".

Unlike previous tours, Bowie performed as himself. He said at the time: "No more costumes, no more masks. This time it's the real thing." Nevertheless, Bowie wore costumes designed by Natasha Kornilof, who collaborated with Bowie on projects in the late 1960s and early 1970s. According to Nicholas Pegg, this new look was "a succession of tight shirts, snakeskin pants, [sailor's] caps and ballooning pleated trousers" that became known in fashion circles as "Bowie pants". He cut his hair short and looked healthier compared to previous tours. The backing musicians were also allowed to wear what they wanted, leading to choices such as Hawaiian shirts for Belew, a kimono and cowboy outfit for Murray, leather jackets and jeans for House and punk rock attire for Alomar.

The tour also featured larger audiences than Bowie's previous tours, performing to between 10,000 and 40,000 people. To accommodate the increase in attendance, Bowie modified the stage dressing of the Isolar I tour: the ceilings and surrounding walls featured large panels of striped light that would pulse with the music. Unlike the first Isolar tour, white colours were replaced with blues, greens and reds, which the biographer David Buckley argues provided a "warmer, less forbidding visual experience".

=== Song selection ===
The setlist for the tour generally consisted of material from the previous year's albums, Low and "Heroes", with the second half of each performance opening with a seven-song sequence from The Rise and Fall of Ziggy Stardust and the Spiders from Mars album, which were rearranged with a synthesiser-heavy sound. Bowie initially wanted to perform the entire 12-track album, before trimming it down to seven songs: "Five Years", "Soul Love", "Star", "Hang On to Yourself", "Ziggy Stardust", "Suffragette City" and "Rock 'n' Roll Suicide". The only hit singles played on the tour were "The Jean Genie", "Rebel Rebel" and "Fame".

The shows typically opened with the moddy instrumental "Warszawa", which was followed by "'Heroes'". The rest of the first half generally alternated between instrumentals and upbeat tracks from Low and "Heroes", with "The Jean Genie" placed in the middle. The set ended with "Fame". A short intermission split a typical night's show into two parts, including an encore. The instrumental "Art Decade" typically followed the Ziggy Stardust tracks, a mellow track to follow the energy of the Ziggy Stardust material. The set closed with "Station to Station", after which came a three-song encore of "Stay", "TVC 15" and "Rebel Rebel". The setlist remained the same throughout most of the North American leg, with slight changes in song order; in mid-April, a cover of Bertolt Brecht and Kurt Weill's "Alabama Song" was added. In the late 1980s, Bowie regarded some of the songs he performed live on the tour as a bit "ponderous", referring specifically to some of the long instrumental performances such as "Warszawa".

=== Legs ===
The tour opened in San Diego, California, on 29 March 1978. The following day in Phoenix, Arizona, Bowie was interviewed by Liza Robinson for Hit Parader magazine. In April, he was interviewed by Flo and Eddie for Phonograph Record magazine, which was broadcast on US television. The interviews discussed Bowie's personal life and the revival of Ziggy songs for the tour. The American leg concluded with three concerts at Madison Square Garden in New York City, the last of which was attended by Andy Warhol, Fripp, Eno, Station to Station guitarist Earl Slick, actor Dustin Hoffman, members of Talking Heads and Bowie's future drummer Sterling Campbell.

The European leg of the tour opened on 14 May in Frankfurt, Germany, and concluded with two nights at Earls Court in London on 30 June and 1 July 1978. The tour then went on a four month hiatus, during which Bowie and the band stayed in London to record "Alabama Song", which was played during the tour, and began recording his next studio album Lodger in Montreux, Switzerland. The Australian leg of the tour included Bowie's first shows in Australia and his first large-scale outdoor concerts. Following a week of rehearsals in Sydney, the leg began in Adelaide on 11 November 1978. The setlist remained the same, although "Speed of Life" was dropped. For the first two dates, keyboardist Dennis Garcia substituted for Powell, who had a previous commitment with his group Utopia. Following the Australian shows, the band performed in Japan for Bowie's first concerts there since 1973. After the final show in Tokyo, RCA Records held a 1920s-themed party to celebrate the end of the tour and the release of Just a Gigolo, although Bowie remained in Japan and spent Christmas with his assistant Coco Schwab in Kyoto.

=== Group dynamics ===
The band's group dynamics were mixed. As a recovering drug addict, Bowie was distant. Belew remembered: "I was anxious to get to know him and I did to a certain degree, but, at the same time, there was always this buffer of people around him who really overprotected him. So, unfortunately, I came away from that experience feeling somewhat disappointed that I didn't get to be a better friend to David Bowie." Bowie reportedly also became less accessible to fans, only conversing with them on occasion and only for a few minutes. Belew also recalled not getting along well with the other band members, particularly Alomar. Alomar later admitted that, after touring with Iggy Pop, he wanted to assert himself more as a guitarist. Belew also encountered some conflict with Schwab, who believed he was upstaging Bowie.

== Tour reception and incidents ==
The tour received positive reviews from critics. Reviewing the opening night on 29 March 1978 in San Diego, Robert Hilburn of the Los Angeles Times noted that audience reception was more positive to the Ziggy Stardust material than the newer songs. He also said that the band members' performances were rough at times, but believed they would improve over the tour. Analysing Bowie as an artist, Hilburn called him "the first great rock star to emerge in the '70s", noting that while he was not a consistent hitmaker or draw the largest crowds, he "shook the rock 'n' roll epicenter more than any other single figure in that period". He concluded that Bowie "remains a towering figure in rock, one whose side steps are more interesting than most lesser artists' biggest leaps forward." The New York Times called the opening show "superb", noting positive audience reception that was "a genuine attestation of excellence". The show in Newcastle was reviewed by the New Musical Express and Sounds magazine. The former's Tony Parsons praised Bowie, the band ("...the tightest outfit he's ever worked with, and that includes the Spiders..."), and the set, calling the "expressionist banks of white neon strip-lighting" "dazzling". The latter's Phil Sutcliffe praised Bowie and the band's performances but criticised the absence of hits such as "Young Americans", "Golden Years" and "Space Oddity".

The tour did have several incidents. In Detroit, riotous crowds forced Bowie to stop playing two songs. The New York Times also noted that fans mounted a sign that said "Bring Back Old' Bowie" on the venue's balcony. In Boston, police officers removed two girls after they exposed their breasts during "The Jean Genie", and in Toronto, a fan smuggled in two beach balls and bounced them around the crowd; Bowie would incorporate these into the 1983 Serious Moonlight Tour. In Berlin, during "Station to Station", Bowie intercepted a bouncer manhandling a fan, earning him positive local press. The show in Marseille was disrupted by a blown PA (coincidentally during the song "Blackout"), during which a fan ran up on stage and kissed Bowie in the darkness. At the Melbourne show, the band performed during heavy rainfall.

== Live recordings ==
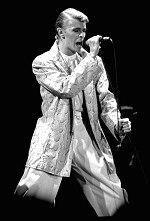
David Bowie performs in Oslo, Norway, 5 June 1978

The tour band remembered that "every show was taped" for Bowie's private use. The tapes were carefully guarded by Alomar. The performances at Providence Civic Center, Boston Garden and Philadelphia Spectrum were recorded for the live album Stage, which was released on 25 September 1978. Mayes recalled that for that show, they slowed the tempo (of most songs) for the recording, the only night such a change was made.

The performance on 10 April 1978 at the Dallas Convention Center was filmed for a television special titled David Bowie on Stage, where six songs were broadcast: "What in the World", "Blackout", "Sense of Doubt", "Speed of Life", "Hang On to Yourself", and "Ziggy Stardust". On 30 May, the band performed in Bremen before a small studio audience of 150 for the German show Musikladen Extra, which was broadcast on 4 August and later repeated on MTV. The performance at the NHK Hall in Tokyo, Japan, on 12 December 1978 was filmed and broadcast on Japanese TV's The Young Music Show.

The final night of the Earls Court performance in London was recorded by the RCA mobile unit with the live performance premiere of the song, "Sound and Vision", later released on the 1995 compilation album, Rarestonebowie. Record Store Day on 21 April 2018 saw the release of Welcome to the Blackout (Live London '78), recorded at Earls Court on 30 June and 1 July 1978. The performances at Earls Court were filmed by David Hemmings, with extracts broadcast on a British TV programme, The London Weekend Show. The film went unreleased, reportedly because Bowie was dissatisfied with it. In 2001, he said in an interview: "I simply didn't like the way it had been shot. Now, of course, it looks pretty good, and I would suspect that it would make it out some time in the future." The unreleased film became widely sought after amongst Bowie fans and collectors. Some of Hemmings' original footage was remastered and featured in Brett Morgen's 2022 film Moonage Daydream. In October 2026, it was announced that the original film would finally be released. The film, titled David Bowie in "Stage", was remastered by Morgen, and is set to premiere at the Uber Arena in Berlin in February 2027.

== Legacy ==
According to Pegg, the Isolar II tour has often been viewed by some historians in an unfavourable light, primarily due to the poor reception of the Stage live album. When interviewed by Buckley, an anonymous Bowie fan said that Stage did not do the tour "justice". However, he states that while the shows may have lacked the excitement of Bowie's previous tours, the backing band was one of Bowie's best. Tony Visconti later said that "each musician is full of dazzling musical personality". The tour was also a commercial success, with most shows sold out. Additionally, the use of synthesisers proved influential. According to Pegg, in the months following the tour's end, Top of the Pops was flooded with acts that mimicked the tour's visuals, musicality and costumes.

Pianist Sean Mayes later published a posthumous diary, titled We Can Be Heroes: Life On Tour With David Bowie, about his experiences on the tour and recording Lodger.

== Setlist ==
This setlist, from a June 1978 performance at Newcastle City Hall, is representative of the setlist at most shows on the tour:

Act I

1. "Warszawa"
2. "'Heroes'"
3. "Be My Wife"
4. "What in the World"
5. "Speed of Life"
6. "Breaking Glass"
7. "The Jean Genie"
8. "Blackout"
9. "Beauty and the Beast"
10. "Sense of Doubt"

Act II

11. "Five Years"
12. "Soul Love"
13. "Hang On to Yourself"
14. "Star"
15. "Ziggy Stardust"
16. "Suffragette City"
17. "Art Decade"
18. "Alabama Song"
19. "Station to Station"

Encore

20. "Stay"
21. "TVC 15"
22. "Rebel Rebel"

== Tour band ==
Personnel according to the NME:

- David Bowie – vocals, chamberlin
- Adrian Belew – lead guitar, backing vocals
- Carlos Alomar – rhythm guitar, backing vocals
- George Murray – bass guitar, backing vocals
- Dennis Davis – drums, percussion
- Roger Powell – keyboards, Moog Taurus bass pedals, synthesiser, backing vocals (except 11–14 November 1978)
- Dennis Garcia – keyboards, synthesiser (11–14 November 1978 only)
- Sean Mayes – piano, string ensemble, backing vocals
- Simon House – electric violin

== Tour dates ==
Sources for tour dates:

Date	City	Country	Venue	Attendance	Revenue
North America
29 March 1978	San Diego	United States	San Diego Sports Arena	9,837	$93,286
30 March 1978	Phoenix	United States	Arizona Veterans Memorial Coliseum		
2 April 1978	Fresno	United States	Selland Arena	4,953	$42,592
3 April 1978	Inglewood	United States	The Forum	44,415	$402,307
4 April 1978	Inglewood	United States	The Forum	44,415	$402,307
5 April 1978	Oakland	United States	Oakland–-Alameda County Coliseum		
6 April 1978	Inglewood	United States	The Forum		
9 April 1978	Houston	United States	The Summit		
10 April 1978	Dallas	United States	Convention Center		
11 April 1978	Baton Rouge	United States	LSU Assembly Center		
13 April 1978	Nashville	United States	Municipal Auditorium	7,096	$59,749
14 April 1978	Memphis	United States	Mid-South Coliseum		
15 April 1978	Kansas City	United States	Municipal Auditorium		
17 April 1978	Chicago	United States	Arie Crown Theatre	8,555	$87,022
18 April 1978	Chicago	United States	Arie Crown Theatre	8,555	$87,022
20 April 1978	Detroit	United States	Cobo Arena		
21 April 1978	Detroit	United States	Cobo Arena		
22 April 1978	Richfield	United States	Richfield Coliseum		
24 April 1978	Milwaukee	United States	MECCA Arena	7,015	$50,691
26 April 1978	Pittsburgh	United States	Civic Arena		
27 April 1978	Landover	United States	Capital Centre		
28 April 1978	Philadelphia	United States	Spectrum Arena		
29 April 1978	Philadelphia	United States	Spectrum Arena		
1 May 1978	Toronto	Canada	Maple Leaf Gardens		
2 May 1978	Ottawa	Canada	Civic Centre		
3 May 1978	Montreal	Canada	Forum		
5 May 1978	Providence	United States	Civic Center		
6 May 1978	Boston	United States	The Gardens		
7 May 1978	New York City	United States	Madison Square Garden		
8 May 1978	New York City	United States	Madison Square Garden		
9 May 1978	New York City	United States	Madison Square Garden		
Europe
14 May 1978	Frankfurt	West Germany	Festhalle Frankfurt		
15 May 1978	Hamburg	West Germany	Congress-Centrum		
16 May 1978	~~Düsseldorf~~	West Germany	~~Philipshalle~~		
16 May 1978	West Berlin	West Germany	Deutschlandhalle		
18 May 1978	Essen	West Germany	Grugahalle		
19 May 1978	Cologne	West Germany	Sporthalle		
20 May 1978	Munich	West Germany	Olympiahalle		
21 May 1978	Bremen	West Germany	Musikladen		
22 May 1978	Vienna	Austria	Wiener Stadthalle		
24 May 1978	Paris	France	Pavillon de Paris		
25 May 1978	Paris	France	Pavillon de Paris		
26 May 1978	Lyon	France	Palais des Sports de Gerland		
27 May 1978	Marseille	France	~~Parc Chanot~~		
27 May 1978	Marseille	France	Palais des Sports de Marseille		
31 May 1978	Copenhagen	Denmark	Folketeatret		
1 June 1978	Copenhagen	Denmark	Folketeatret		
2 June 1978	Stockholm	Sweden	~~Skansen~~		
2 June 1978	Stockholm	Sweden	Kungliga Tennishallen		
4 June 1978	Gothenburg	Sweden	Scandinavium		
5 June 1978	Oslo	Norway	Ekeberghallen		
7 June 1978	Rotterdam	Netherlands	Rotterdam Ahoy		
8 June 1978	Rotterdam	Netherlands	Rotterdam Ahoy		
9 June 1978	Rotterdam	Netherlands	Rotterdam Ahoy		
11 June 1978	Brussels	Belgium	Forest National		
12 June 1978	Brussels	Belgium	Forest National		
14 June 1978	Newcastle upon Tyne	England	Newcastle City Hall		
15 June 1978	Newcastle upon Tyne	England	Newcastle City Hall		
16 June 1978	Newcastle upon Tyne	England	Newcastle City Hall		
19 June 1978	Glasgow	Scotland	The Apollo		
20 June 1978	Glasgow	Scotland	The Apollo		
21 June 1978	Glasgow	Scotland	The Apollo		
22 June 1978	Glasgow	Scotland	The Apollo		
24 June 1978	Stafford	England	New Bingley Hall		
25 June 1978	Stafford	England	New Bingley Hall		
26 June 1978	Stafford	England	New Bingley Hall		
29 June 1978	London	England	Earl's Court		
30 June 1978	London	England	Earl's Court		
1 July 1978	London	England	Earl's Court		
Oceania
11 November 1978	Adelaide	Australia	Adelaide Oval		
14 November 1978	Perth	Australia	Perth Entertainment Centre		
15 November 1978	Perth	Australia	Perth Entertainment Centre		
18 November 1978	Melbourne	Australia	Melbourne Cricket Ground		
21 November 1978	Brisbane	Australia	Lang Park		
24 November 1978	Sydney	Australia	RAS Showgrounds		
25 November 1978	Sydney	Australia	RAS Showgrounds		
29 November 1978	Christchurch	New Zealand	Queen Elizabeth II Park		
2 December 1978	Auckland	New Zealand	Western Springs Stadium		
Asia
6 December 1978	Osaka	Japan	Osaka Welfare Pension Hall		
7 December 1978	Osaka	Japan	Osaka Welfare Pension Hall		
9 December 1978	Suita	Japan	Expo Hall		
11 December 1978	Tokyo	Japan	Nippon Budokan		
12 December 1978	Tokyo	Japan	NHK Hall		
Total

== Songs ==
All songs written by David Bowie, except where noted.

From The Rise and Fall of Ziggy Stardust and the Spiders from Mars

- "Five Years"
- "Soul Love"
- "Star"
- "Hang On to Yourself"
- "Ziggy Stardust"
- "Suffragette City"
- "Rock 'n' Roll Suicide"

From Aladdin Sane

- "The Jean Genie"

From Diamond Dogs

- "Rebel Rebel"

From Young Americans

- "Fame" (Bowie, John Lennon, Carlos Alomar)

From Station to Station

- "Station to Station"
- "TVC 15"
- "Stay"

From Low

- "Speed of Life"
- "Breaking Glass" (Bowie, Dennis Davis, George Murray)
- "What in the World"
- "Sound and Vision"
- "Be My Wife"
- "Warszawa" (Bowie, Brian Eno)
- "Art Decade"

From "Heroes"

- "Beauty and the Beast"
- "'Heroes'" (Bowie, Eno)
- "Blackout"
- "Sense of Doubt"

Other songs:

- "Alabama Song" (originally from Bertolt Brecht's opera Rise and Fall of the City of Mahagonny; written by Brecht and Kurt Weill; a non-album single later released in 1980)
