= The Best of David Bowie 1974/1979 =

Greatest hits album by David Bowie
- Released: April 1998
- Recorded: 1974–1979
- Genre: Rock
- Length: 69:33
- Label: EMI
- Producer: Various

David Bowie chronology
Earthling in the City (1997)	The Best of David Bowie 1974/1979 (1998)	Hours (1999)

David Bowie compilation chronology
The Best of David Bowie 1969/1974 (1997)	The Best of David Bowie 1974/1979 (1998)	Bowie at the Beeb (2000)

Professional ratings
Review scores
Source	Rating
AllMusic	4/5 stars
Pitchfork Media	8.6/10
The Encyclopedia of Popular Music	2/5 stars
The Rolling Stone Album Guide	4/5 stars

The Best of David Bowie 1974/1979 is a compilation album by English singer-songwriter David Bowie, released in 1998 by EMI. It follows The Best of David Bowie 1969/1974 (1997) and includes material released between 1974 and 1979. This album was also included as the second disc of the compilation The Platinum Collection (2005/2006).

== Track listing ==
All songs written by David Bowie, except where noted.

No.	Title	Writer(s)	Place of Origin	Length
1.	"Sound and Vision"		Low, 1977	3:02
2.	"Golden Years" (Single version)		Station to Station, 1976	3:28
3.	"Fame"	Bowie, Carlos Alomar, John Lennon	Young Americans, 1975	4:13
4.	"Young Americans" (U.S. single version)		Young Americans	3:12
5.	"John, I'm Only Dancing (Again)"		Non-album single, 1979; 1974 re-recorded version of "John, I'm Only Dancing" from 1972/1973	6:59
6.	"Can You Hear Me?"		Young Americans	5:05
7.	"Wild Is the Wind"	Dimitri Tiomkin, Ned Washington	Station to Station; originally by Johnny Mathis for the film of the same name, 1957	5:59
8.	"Knock on Wood" (Live)	Steve Cropper, Eddie Floyd	David Live, 1974; originally by Eddie Floyd from Knock on Wood, 1966	2:58
9.	"TVC 15" (Single version)		Station to Station	3:32
10.	"1984"		Diamond Dogs, 1974	3:25
11.	"It's Hard to Be a Saint in the City"	Bruce Springsteen	Sound + Vision box set, 1989; recorded in 1975 for Station to Station	3:46
12.	"Look Back in Anger"	Bowie, Brian Eno	Lodger, 1979	3:06
13.	"The Secret Life of Arabia"	Bowie, Eno, Alomar	"Heroes", 1977	3:45
14.	"DJ"	Bowie, Eno, Alomar	Lodger	4:02
15.	"Beauty and the Beast"		"Heroes"	3:34
16.	"Breaking Glass"	Bowie, Dennis Davis, George Murray	Low, 1977	1:51
17.	"Boys Keep Swinging"	Bowie, Eno	Lodger	3:18
18.	""Heroes"" (Single version)	Bowie, Eno	"Heroes", 1977	3:33

== Charts ==
Chart (1998)	Peak position
UK Albums (OCC)	39

Chart (2009)	Peak position
Spanish Albums (PROMUSICAE)	96

Chart (2016)	Peak position
Australian Albums (ARIA)	49
New Zealand Albums (RMNZ)	38

=== Certifications ===
Region	Certification	Certified units/sales
New Zealand (RMNZ)	Platinum	15,000^{^}
United Kingdom (BPI)	Gold	100,000^{*}
^{*} Sales figures based on certification alone.^{^} Shipments figures based on certification alone.
