= Stay (David Bowie song) =

1976 song by David Bowie

Single by David Bowie

from the album Station to Station
- B-side: "Word on a Wing"
- Released: July 1976
- Recorded: October–November 1975
- Studio: Cherokee, Los Angeles
- Genre: Funk rock; soul; hard rock
- Length: 6:15 (album version); 3:21 (single version)
- Label: RCA
- Songwriter: David Bowie
- Producers: David Bowie; Harry Maslin

David Bowie singles chronology
"TVC 15" (1976)	"Stay" (1976)	"Suffragette City" (1976)

"Stay" is a song by the English musician David Bowie, released on his 1976 album Station to Station. The song was recorded in late 1975 at Cherokee Studios in Los Angeles. Co-produced by Bowie and Harry Maslin, the recording featured guitarists Carlos Alomar and Earl Slick, bassist George Murray, drummer Dennis Davis, pianist Roy Bittan and Warren Peace on percussion. The track features prominent dual guitar work from Slick and Alomar, who mostly composed it in the studio. Based on the chord structure of "John, I'm Only Dancing (Again)", "Stay" emulates funk rock, soul and hard rock. The song's lyrics are abstract and relate to love.

Bowie debuted the song on the variety show Dinah! on 3 January 1976. In July the same year, RCA Records released "Stay" as the B-side of "Suffragette City" and again as an A-side in edited form in the United States; both failed to chart. The track has received positive reviews from music critics and biographers, with many praising the performance of the band. "Stay" was a live staple throughout Bowie's concert tours, performances of which have appeared on numerous live albums. The song was remixed by Maslin in 2010 for reissues of Station to Station and remastered in 2016 for the Who Can I Be Now? (1974–1976) box set. Bowie recorded a new version of "Stay" in 1997 during the rehearsals for the Earthling Tour, which appeared on the 2020 EP Is It Any Wonder? as "Stay '97".

== Recording ==
After completing his work on The Man Who Fell to Earth in September 1975, David Bowie returned to Los Angeles to begin recording his next album. Personnel-wise, Bowie brought back the same team used for "Fame": co-producer Harry Maslin, guitarists Carlos Alomar and Earl Slick, drummer Dennis Davis and Bowie's old friend Geoff MacCormick (credited as Warren Peace), while bassist George Murray was recruited to play bass; pianist Roy Bittan, a member of Bruce Springsteen's E Street Band, joined the sessions in mid-October. For the studio, Bowie and Maslin chose Los Angeles's Cherokee Studios, which featured five different studio rooms, 24-track mixing consoles, 24-hour session times, and a lounge bar.

Recording for the new album began in late September 1975 and ended in late November. According to biographer Chris O'Leary, recording for "Stay" began sometime in October. Like the majority of the album, the song's elements were primarily built in the studio rather than written before. Due to Bowie's heavy cocaine use during the sessions, he later recalled remembering almost nothing of the album's production. Alomar recalled the song was recorded "very much in a cocaine frenzy":

'Stay' was basically done with the rhythm section. It was pretty funky and pretty much straight ahead. I wrote out a chart and said this was pretty much what we wanted to do. That song I think David did on the guitar. He strummed a few chords for me, and then we gave it back to him. The rhythm section really liked that one, and then Earl Slick covered some of the lines I had laid down with a thicker sound.

Bowie later acknowledged that the song initially began as an attempt at "John, I'm Only Dancing (Again)", a funk reworking of Bowie's 1972 track "John, I'm Only Dancing" that was recorded during the sessions for Young Americans (1975) and later released as a single in 1979. Alomar and Slick experimented with a slightly varied "(Again)" chord progression, sped up the tempo and, after days or weeks of studio jamming, the band, in Alomar's words, "gave [the song] back to [Bowie]." According to O'Leary, Bowie pitted Alomar and Slick against each other, repeating what he did on the latter half of the Diamond Dogs Tour (known as the Soul tour). Slick recalled in 2014: "He had polar opposites, and he allowed those differences to shape the guitar sound on the album." On "Stay", Slick recorded a solo, which Alomar then overdubbed, repeating the process. O'Leary calls the final mix "the record of their war, underpinned by a George Murray bassline that could support a Buick".

== Composition ==
The ending sequence of "Stay"
This sample showcases the song's elements of funk and prevalent dual guitar work by Alomar and Slick.

The musical style of both "Stay" and "Golden Years" are built upon the funk and soul of Young Americans but with a harsher, grinding edge. Biographer Nicholas Pegg describes it as a simultaneous hybrid of funk, soul and hard rock, while James E. Perone argues that "Stay" represents a merge of hard rock and blue-eyed funk. Author Marc Spitz analyses "Stay" as "urban funk sped up for against-the-wall fucking, as opposed to the horizontal quiet storms of Young Americans". Writing for AllMusic, Ned Raggett found a combination of the "dramatic rock" of Diamond Dogs (1974) and the "funk and soul" of Young Americans. He writes that compared to tracks like "Young Americans", "Stay" contains a "chiller" arrangement, which he believes "manages to sound like something that could easily fit into a 1976-era nightclub though still somehow standing apart from it". In 2010, Frank Mojica of Consequence of Sound classified the song as funk rock.

The song begins with the band assembling itself. Slick starts on guitar on his D string—mixed right and echoed left—before oppressing two G9 chords. Author Peter Doggett describes an "effortless self-confidence" in Slick's introduction. From there, bass and drums join, followed by percussion and keyboards. The instruments play off one another until settling into a restless groove. O'Leary writes that in the intro, Slick is playing lead and Alomar supports but, by the verses and refrains, the roles are swapped: Alomar's rhythm guitar paces the track while Slick echoes it. In the closing solo, the two duel ferociously, with Slick playing variations of his opening riff and Alomar working around that. Bowie, whose vocals are absent past the four-minute mark, matched the guitars in the refrains with what O'Leary calls a "low-sung 'voice of reason'".

Spitz interprets Station to Station as "an album of love songs", specifically "the kind you write when you have no love in your own life". The abstract lyrics of "Stay" have been interpreted as reflecting on "the uncertainty of sexual conquest", which NME editors Roy Carr and Charles Shaar Murray believe is an example of [Bowie's character] the Thin White Duke's "spurious romanticism". Pegg describes the lyrics as "an anxious confessional about the inscrutability of ships that pass in the night", evident by the line "You can never really tell when somebody wants something you want too", which he believes epitomises "the combination of racking self-doubt and confidently stylish production found throughout the album". According to Perone, Bowie's character begs his lover to stay, as he knows that if she leaves this time it could be the last. Biographer David Buckley calls Bowie's emotions "pure shellac, brittle, yet simultaneously claustrophobically contrived and alienated". Perone writes that Bowie would revisit similar themes on his 1977 album "Heroes" (particularly "Joe the Lion") and later on various tracks of the late 1990s and early 2000s.

== Release and reception ==
On 3 January 1976, Bowie and his band appeared on the Dinah Shore-hosted variety show Dinah! where they performed "Stay", marking the song's public debut. Writer Rob Sheffield calls the performance the debut of Bowie's character the Thin White Duke and further noted Bowie's dancing while on stage. Compared to other appearances on television during this period, particularly when he performed "Golden Years" on Soul Train, Bowie was more relaxed and coherent during his Dinah! interview. RCA issued Station to Station later that month on 23 January, with "Stay" sequenced as the second track on side two of the original LP, between "TVC 15" and Bowie's cover of "Wild Is the Wind". In July, the full-length six minute album version of "Stay" appeared as the B-side of the "Suffragette City" single, which was issued to promote the Changesonebowie compilation. It failed to chart. "Stay" was then issued as an A-side in the US the same month in heavily edited form—running 3:21—with the catalogue number PB 10736 and fellow album track "Word on a Wing" as the B-side. It failed to chart.

"Stay" has received positive reviews from music critics and biographers, with many highlighting the performance of the band. In a review of the album on release, John Ingham of Sounds magazine gave immense praise to Station to Station, naming "Golden Years", "TVC 15" and "Stay" some of Bowie's best songs up to that point. Pegg calls the song "one of Bowie's classic [musical] hybrids" and finds the rhythm guitar riff one of the finest in Bowie's entire catalogue. Mojica and Raggett similarly praise the guitar work as one of Bowie's best, with the latter calling it one of the album's standouts. Doggett commends the band's performance on the track, writing that despite recording it in a "cocaine frenzy", they performed "with utter conviction and a staggering command of dynamics". Buckley calls Bowie's vocal performance one of his "most insecure and helpless". Mojo magazine later listed it as Bowie's 32nd greatest song in 2015. In a 2016 list ranking every Bowie single from worst to best, Ultimate Classic Rock placed "Stay" at number 51, calling the single edit inferior to the album version.

== Live versions and subsequent releases ==
"Stay" remained a concert staple throughout Bowie's career, being performed on the 1976 Isolar I, 1978 Isolar II, 1983 Serious Moonlight, 1990 Sound+Vision, 1997 Earthling, 1999 Hours, 2000 Mini, and 2002 Heathen tours. Due to the song's extended outro, Bowie added bursts of "stay" tags throughout during live performances, including "stay—why don't you" tags with Gail Ann Dorsey in the 1990s. O'Leary notes that Bowie sometimes simply stared at the players in bemusement. A recording from the Isolar tour at the Nassau Coliseum on 23 March 1976 was first released as a bonus track on the 1991 Rykodisc reissue of Station to Station, and again in remixed form on Live Nassau Coliseum '76 (2010). A performance from the Isolar II tour was included on the expanded reissues of the 1978 live album Stage in 2005 and 2017. Another performance from the same tour was later included on Welcome to the Blackout (2018). Bowie's performance of the song at the Glastonbury Festival on 25 June 2000 was released in 2018 on Glastonbury 2000. A couple days after Glastonbury on 27 June, Bowie performed "Stay" at the BBC Radio Theatre in London. This performance was released on the bonus disc accompanying the first releases of Bowie at the Beeb (2000). A previously unreleased performance from the Montreux Jazz Festival on 18 July 2002 was released on the box set I Can't Give Everything Away (2002–2016) in 2025.

The single edit of "Stay" appeared on the Christiane F. soundtrack in 1981. According to Pegg, this is one of the few CD sources for the single edit. The song, and its parent album, was remastered in 2016 for the Who Can I Be Now? (1974–1976) box set, with a standalone album release the following year. Both the original mix and 2010 Maslin mix were included, while the single edit was included on Re:Call 2, part of that set.

Bowie rerecorded "Stay" in 1997 during the rehearsals for the Earthling Tour. Bowie wanted to update some of his live staples to better fit the material of his then-recent albums Outside (1995) and Earthling (1997). The new version was rehearsed at The Factory in Dublin with Mark Plati and Reeves Gabrels before it was properly recorded at New York's Right Track Recordings between May and June 1997. Initially intended for release as a B-side, it remained unreleased until 2020, when it was included on the EP Is It Any Wonder?, titled "Stay '97". Jon Blistein of Rolling Stone described it as "an extremely nineties update" of the original, describing elements of alternative rock, gothic rock, industrial rock and techno.

== Personnel ==
According to biographer Chris O'Leary:

- David Bowie – lead and backing vocals, Minimoog, Mellotron
- Warren Peace – percussion
- Earl Slick – lead guitar
- Carlos Alomar – lead and rhythm guitar
- George Murray – bass
- Dennis Davis – drums, cowbell

Production

- David Bowie – producer
- Harry Maslin – producer
