= Breaking Glass (song) =

Song by David Bowie

Single by David Bowie

from the album Stage
- B-side: "Art Decade"; "Ziggy Stardust"
- Released: 17 November 1978
- Recorded: Either Philadelphia, 28/29 April; Providence, Rhode Island, 5 May or Boston, 6 May 1978
- Genre: Art rock
- Length: 1:52 (Low version); 3:28 (Stage version)
- Label: RCA Victor
- Songwriters: David Bowie; George Murray; Dennis Davis
- Producer: Tony Visconti

David Bowie singles chronology
"Beauty and the Beast" (1978)	"Breaking Glass" (1978)	"Boys Keep Swinging" (1979)

"Breaking Glass" is a song by the English singer-songwriter David Bowie. It was co-written by Bowie, bassist George Murray and drummer Dennis Davis in September 1976. Originally a track on Bowie's eleventh studio album Low (1977), a reworked version of the song was a regular on the Isolar II Tour. A live version from that tour was used as the lead track on a 7-inch EP to promote his second live album, Stage in 1978. The EP reached number 54 on the UK Singles Chart in December 1978.

In the US, the track "Star" was chosen as the lead track for the live EP (with "What in the World" and "Breaking Glass" as B-sides), but failed to chart, while in Japan, "Soul Love" was released to promote Stage (with "Blackout" as the B-side).

Bowie performed "Breaking Glass" on his Isolar II, Serious Moonlight, Outside, Heathen, and A Reality tours.

== Lyrics ==
The original song was uncompromising even by Low's standards. The fractured lyrics are, like several songs written during Bowie's stay in Berlin, introspective of his dark, drug-filled period living in America in 1975–1976. Its lyrics, when written out, look potentially more like a paragraph than a song, and when separated into phrases, the song has a disjointed feeling. The song is short, less than two minutes, with only one verse.

The lines "Don't look at the carpet; I drew something awful on it" refer to Bowie's practice of drawing the tree of life on the floor during that period, as he was interested in Aleister Crowley and Hermetic Qabalah at the time.

== Track listing ==
1. "Breaking Glass" (David Bowie, Dennis Davis, George Murray) – 3:28
2. "Art Decade" (Bowie) – 3:10
3. "Ziggy Stardust" (Bowie) – 3:32

== Personnel ==
- David Bowie – vocals, production
- Carlos Alomar – lead guitar
- Ricky Gardiner – rhythm guitar
- George Murray – bass
- Dennis Davis – drums
- Brian Eno – Minimoog synthesizer
- Tony Visconti – production

== Live versions ==
- A spring 1978 live version recorded on the Isolar II Tour was released on Stage and on the above-mentioned single. This live version was also released as the B-side of the single "Star" in 1978. A summer 1978 performance from the same tour was included on Welcome to the Blackout, released in 2018.
- A live performance during the Serious Moonlight Tour, filmed on 12 September 1983, was included on the Serious Moonlight concert video (1984) and the identically-named live album included with the Loving the Alien (1983–1988) box set (2018) and released separately in 2019.
- Two separate live recordings of the song, performed during Bowie's 1995–96 Outside Tour, appear on the live albums Ouvre le Chien (Live Dallas 95) (2020) and No Trendy Réchauffé (Live Birmingham 95) (2020).
- A November 2003 live version recorded on the A Reality Tour was released on the A Reality Tour album, in 2010.

== Other releases ==
- The song appeared on the following compilations:
- Chameleon (Holland 1979) (studio version)
- The Best of Bowie (1980) (1978 live version)
- Sound + Vision box set (1989) (1978 live version)
- The Best of David Bowie 1974/1979 (1998) (studio version)
- The Platinum Collection (2005/2006) (studio version)
- It was released as a picture disc in the RCA Life Time picture disc set.
- An extended version of the studio recording of the song, originally released as a single in Australia, was made available in digital and CD formats for the first time in 2017, on Re:Call 3, part of the A New Career in a New Town (1977–1982) compilation.
