= Blackout (David Bowie song) =

1977 song by David Bowie

Song by David Bowie

from the album "Heroes"
- Released: 14 October 1977
- Recorded: Hansa Studio by the Wall, West Berlin; July–August 1977
- Genre: Art rock
- Length: 3:50
- Label: RCA
- Songwriter: David Bowie
- Producers: David Bowie, Tony Visconti

"Blackout" is a song written and recorded by David Bowie in 1977 for the album "Heroes". Author Nicholas Pegg described the track as "typical of the darkly exhilarating sonic schizophrenia of the "Heroes" album", while biographer David Buckley remarked on "a backing verging on industrial". Regarding its lyrics and subject matter, Bowie himself said in 1999 that the song "did indeed refer to power cuts. I can't in all honesty say that it was the NY one [New York City blackout of 1977], though it is entirely likely that that image locked itself in my head."

== Reception ==
NME's Roy Carr and Charles Shaar Murray considered it to have "overtones of Bowie's personal blackout in Berlin (where he collapsed and was rushed to hospital)", noting the line "Get me to the doctor" and an atmosphere of "disorientation, fragmentation, panic".

According to music professor James E. Perrone, the "harrowing" song is the least accessible of the album, offering a prelude to the experimental songs of Bowie's next album, Lodger (1979). The lyrics are difficult to decipher, he writes, as a result of the reverberation Bowie and Visconti added. Nicholas Pegg surmised that the line "Someone's back in town, the chips are down" may have referred to Bowie's wife, Angela Bowie, who had just arrived in Berlin around the same time.

Author and essayist Chris O'Leary referred to Blackout as being "as abrasive as "Heroes" gets" and "sound[ing] like a monster". He also drew comparisons with previous songs, such as "Suffragette City" off The Rise and Fall of Ziggy Stardust and the Spiders from Mars and "Stay" off Station to Station.

The cut-up lyrics of "Blackout" were one of the exhibits in the Victoria and Albert Museum exhibition David Bowie Is in 2013.

== Live versions ==
A performance recorded during his Isolar II World Tour was released on his second live album, Stage (1978). This version was also released as a single by RCA in Japan in November 1978, backed with "Soul Love" from the same series of concerts. The 1978 performance was also included on the live album Welcome to the Blackout (Live London ’78), released in 2018. Bowie's introduction of the song to the audience gave the 2018 album its title.
