= Welcome to the Blackout (Live London '78) =

2018 live album by David Bowie

Live album by David Bowie
- Released: 21 April 2018
- Recorded: 30 June – 1 July 1978
- Venues: Earls Court, London
- Studio: RCA Mobile
- Genre: Art rock
- Length: 108:13
- Label: Parlophone
- Producer: Tony Visconti

David Bowie chronology
A New Career in a New Town (1977–1982) (2017)	Welcome to the Blackout (Live London '78) (2018)	Never Let Me Down 2018 (2018)

David Bowie live albums chronology
Cracked Actor (Live Los Angeles '74) (2017)	Welcome to the Blackout (Live London '78) (2018)	Glastonbury 2000 (2018)

Welcome to the Blackout (Live London '78) is a live album by the English singer-songwriter David Bowie, recorded during the London concerts of the Isolar II Tour. It had a limited vinyl release on 21 April 2018 for Record Store Day. A more widely available CD edition followed on 29 June 2018, along with digital releases for download and streaming. The album received positive reviews from music critics.

== Recording ==
The album was recorded live during the Isolar II Tour at Earls Court, London on 30 June and 1 July 1978 by Tony Visconti with the RCA mobile unit. It was mixed by Bowie and David Richards at Mountain Studios, Montreux, from 17–22 January 1979.

The 1 July performances of "Be My Wife" and "Sound and Vision" were previously released on the semi-official 1995 Mainman compilation album, Rarestonebowie.

The director David Hemmings filmed the shows for a cinematic release later in 1978. Bowie was dissatisfied with the film and it was never released, saying in 2000, "I simply didn't like the way it had been shot." In October 2026, it was announced that the original film would finally be released. The film, titled David Bowie in "Stage", was remastered by filmmaker Brett Morgen, and is set to premiere at the Uber Arena in Berlin in February 2027.

== Reception ==
Professional ratings
Aggregate scores
Source	Rating
Metacritic	84/100
Review scores
Source	Rating
AllMusic	3.5/5 stars
Classic Pop	5/5 stars
Classic Rock	4/5 stars
Mojo	5/5 stars

According to the review aggregator Metacritic, Welcome to the Blackout (Live London '78) received "universal acclaim" based on a weighted average score of 84 out of 100 from 4 critic scores. Reviewing the album for AllMusic, Stephen Thomas Erlewine praised Welcome to the Blackout as a superior experience to Stage, another live album from the 1978 tour. He specifically thought the band's performances were not as "stiff", noting that flaws were kept in that made the experience "invigorating". Classic Pop highlighted the performances of Bowie and the band, stating that Welcome to the Blackout "showcased a recovering genius on top of his game". Mojo magazine called the album superior to Stage (1978) and "an essential purchase for Bowie fans".

== Track listing ==
=== Vinyl release ===
All tracks are written by David Bowie, except where noted.

Side one
No.	Title	Writer(s)	Length
1.	"Warszawa"	David Bowie; Brian Eno
2.	"'Heroes'"	Bowie; Eno
3.	"What in the World"

Side two
No.	Title	Length
4.	"Be My Wife"
5.	"The Jean Genie"
6.	"Blackout"
7.	"Sense of Doubt"

Side three
No.	Title	Writer(s)	Length
8.	"Speed of Life"
9.	"Sound and Vision"
10.	"Breaking Glass"	Bowie; Dennis Davis; George Murray
11.	"Fame"	Bowie; Carlos Alomar; John Lennon
12.	"Beauty and the Beast"

Side four
No.	Title	Length
13.	"Five Years"
14.	"Soul Love"
15.	"Star"
16.	"Hang On to Yourself"
17.	"Ziggy Stardust"
18.	"Suffragette City"

Side five
No.	Title	Writer(s)	Length
19.	"Art Decade"
20.	"Alabama Song"	Bertolt Brecht; Kurt Weill
21.	"Station to Station"

Side six
No.	Title	Length
22.	"TVC 15"
23.	"Stay"
24.	"Rebel Rebel"

=== CD Release ===
Disc one
No.	Title	Writer(s)	Length
1.	"Warszawa"	Bowie; Eno	6:27
2.	"'Heroes'"	Bowie; Eno	7:34
3.	"What in the World"		4:07
4.	"Be My Wife"		2:53
5.	"The Jean Genie"		6:34
6.	"Blackout"		3:43
7.	"Sense of Doubt"		3:40
8.	"Speed of Life"		2:37
9.	"Sound and Vision"		3:12
10.	"Breaking Glass"	Bowie; Davis; Murray	3:31
11.	"Fame"	Bowie; Alomar; Lennon	3:52
12.	"Beauty and the Beast"		4:58

Disc two
No.	Title	Writer(s)	Length
1.	"Five Years"		6:09
2.	"Soul Love"		2:52
3.	"Star"		2:30
4.	"Hang On to Yourself"		2:40
5.	"Ziggy Stardust"		3:25
6.	"Suffragette City"		4:02
7.	"Art Decade"		3:08
8.	"Alabama Song"	Brecht; Weill	3:59
9.	"Station to Station"		11:10
10.	"TVC 15"		4:18
11.	"Stay"		6:59
12.	"Rebel Rebel"		3:53

== Personnel ==
- David Bowie – vocals, chamberlin
- Adrian Belew – lead guitar, backing vocals
- Carlos Alomar – rhythm guitar, backing vocals, music director
- George Murray – bass guitar, backing vocals
- Dennis Davis – drums, percussion
- Roger Powell – keyboards, Moog Taurus bass pedals, synthesizer, backing vocals
- Sean Mayes – piano, ARP String Ensemble, backing vocals
- Simon House – electric violin
- Producer: Tony Visconti
- Post production mix: David Bowie, David Richards
- Photography: Sukita and Chris Walter

Live performance personnel

- Rick Browning - Piano tech
- Jan Michael Alejandro – band tech
- Vern "Moose" Constan – band tech
- Leroy Kerr – band tech
- Buford Jones – FOH mixer
- Townsend Wessinger – Showco sound crew
- Billy King – Showco sound crew
- Russell Davis – Showco sound crew
- Randy Marshall – Showco sound crew
- Glenn George – Showco sound crew

== Charts ==
Chart performance for Welcome to the Blackout
Chart (2018)	Peak position
Austrian Albums (Ö3 Austria)	55
Belgian Albums (Ultratop Flanders)	39
Belgian Albums (Ultratop Wallonia)	96
Croatian International Albums (HDU)	1
Dutch Albums (Album Top 100)	32
French Albums (SNEP)	127
German Albums (Offizielle Top 100)	58
Irish Albums (Official Charts)	36
Italian Albums (FIMI)	83
New Zealand Heatseeker Albums (RMNZ)	3
Portuguese Albums (AFP)	30
Scottish Albums (Official Charts)	11
Spanish Albums (PROMUSICAE)	86
Swiss Albums (Schweizer Hitparade)	75
UK Albums (Official Charts)	16
US Top Alternative Albums (Billboard)	23
