= Art Decade =

1977 instrumental performed by David Bowie

Instrumental by David Bowie

from the album Low
- Released: January 14, 1977
- Recorded: September–November 1976
- Genre: Ambient
- Length: 3:46
- Label: RCA
- Songwriter: David Bowie
- Producers: David Bowie and Tony Visconti

"Art Decade" is an instrumental by English singer-songwriter David Bowie, released on his 1977 album Low.

The song is named for a street that Bowie had encountered in West Berlin, the name of which was a pun on the art deco style. In fact, the song itself, like the rest of the songs on the b-side of Low, is a portrait of West Berlin. Recounting his impressions, Bowie later called West Berlin "a city cut off from its world, art and culture, dying with no hope of retribution." As a result, the song is slow and attempts a melancholy, depressing sound.

The song features a quick introduction to percussion and vibraphone, using a caravan-like drum sound to continue throughout the piece. Bowie's melodic portion of the composition is layered over the synthetic soundscapes of Brian Eno, whose synthesizer effects are reminiscent of those of the No Pussyfooting album from 1973. The song is intentionally repetitive; half the song does not stray from an E major chord while a two note melody repeats over the sound of continuous effects.

Despite Bowie being credited solely for the song, Brian Eno has said he was responsible for saving the song from the out-take pile. The original piece was recorded on a piano, with both Eno and Bowie playing. "[w]hen we'd finished it he didn't like it very much and sort of forgot about it. But as it happened, during the two days he was gone I...dug that out to see if I could do anything with it. I put all those instruments on top of what we had and then he liked it and realised there was hope for it, and he worked on top of that adding more instruments."

Hansa Studios engineer Eduard Meyer played the cellos on the recording.

== Live versions ==
- Performances from the Isolar II Tour have been released on Stage (1978) and Welcome to the Blackout (2018). These versions featured Carlos Alomar on rhythm guitar, Simon House on violin, Adrian Belew on lead guitar, George Murray on bass guitar and Dennis Davis on real drums and percussion.

== Personnel ==
- David Bowie - guitar, vibraphone, piano, Chamberlin, ARP String Ensemble
- Brian Eno - piano, Minimoog, Chamberlin
- Eduard Meyer - cellos

== Other releases ==
- The live versions from Stage was released as the B-side of the single "Breaking Glass" in 1978.
- It was released as a picture disc in the RCA Life Time picture disc set.

== Sources ==
- Greatorex, Johnathan. "Just a Mortal With Potential." Teenage Wildlife. November 1996. 6 March 2006 .
- Griffin, R. "Low." Bowie Golden Years. January 2005. 6 March 2006 .
