= What in the World =

Song by David Bowie

from the album Low
- Released: 14 January 1977
- Recorded: September–November 1976
- Genre: Art rock
- Length: 2:23
- Label: RCA
- Songwriter: David Bowie
- Producers: David Bowie and Tony Visconti

"What in the World" is a song by David Bowie released on his 1977 album Low, later making appearances as repertoire in the 1978 world tour as well as other major tours.

"What in the World" showcases some of Bowie's Berlin-era songwriting and production techniques. This song, like others on Low, shows Bowie's experiments with disjointed, non-linear lyrics with seemingly random sentences and free-associative phrases.

The song makes heavy use of synthesizer and recording studio techniques, heavily influenced by the work of Brian Eno, who collaborated with the album. A "blip"-like sound comparable to the sounds later made by Pac-Man and the Nintendo Entertainment System pulses throughout the song, which, coupled with extremely rhythmic guitar solos, creates a frantic pace. The song also makes use of the Harmonizer which Tony Visconti brought to the studio which was used to Dennis Davis' drumming. The song also features Iggy Pop on backing vocals. Pop's album The Idiot was recorded back-to-back with Low at the same facility, was produced by Bowie, and featured many of the same musicians.

== Live versions ==
- A live performance recorded during the Isolar II Tour was released on the album Stage. To make the song more accessible for the concert audience, it had been lengthened by some two minutes. This was achieved by first playing the entirety of the first and second verses at a much slower tempo, practically at dance speed, and then repeating the song once again at album speed with its ending reinstalled. A different live performance from the same tour was included on Welcome to the Blackout, released in 2018.
- A live version recorded on 12 September 1983 during the Serious Moonlight Tour was released on the concert film of the same name and on the live album Serious Moonlight (Live '83), which was part of the 2018 box set Loving the Alien (1983–1988) and was released separately the following year.

== Production credits ==
- Producers:
  - Tony Visconti
- Musicians:
  - David Bowie: lead and backing vocals
  - Carlos Alomar: rhythm guitar
  - George Murray: bass
  - Dennis Davis: drums
  - Ricky Gardiner: lead guitars
  - Brian Eno: ARP synthesizers, Rimmer E.M.I.
  - Iggy Pop: backing vocals
  - Roy Young: piano, Farfisa

== Other releases ==
- The live version from Stage, was released as the B-side of the single "Star" in 1978.
- The original album version was released as the B-side of the US release of the single "Boys Keep Swinging" in April 1979.

== Cover versions ==
- The Blue Guitars, released as a single
- Gary Jones, released as a single
- Red Hot Chili Peppers, live in Auckland (14 January 2013 at the Vector Arena)
- Shearwater – as part of a live performance of the entire Berlin Trilogy for WNYC (2018)

== See also ==
- Nintendocore
