= You Send Me (album) =

1978 studio album by Roy Ayers

Studio album by Roy Ayers
- Released: 1978
- Studios: Sigma Sound, New York City; Electric Lady, New York City
- Genres: R&B, disco, jazz-funk
- Length: 39:12
- Label: Polydor
- Producers: Roy Ayers; Carla Vaughn

Roy Ayers chronology
Step Into Our Life (1978)	You Send Me (1978)	Fever (1979)

Singles from You Send Me
- 1. "Get On Up Get On Down" Released: 1978

You Send Me is a studio album by American musician Roy Ayers. It was released in 1978 through Polydor Records. The recording sessions took place at Sigma Sound Studios and Electric Lady Studios in New York City. The album was produced Ayers and Carla Vaughn. It features contributions from vocalists Carla Vaughn and Merry Clayton, keyboardists Philip Woo and Harry Whitaker, guitarists Chuck Anthony and James Mason, bassists William Allen and Kerry Turman, drummers Bernard Purdie, José Ortiz, Dennis Davis, Howard King and Steve Cobb, percussionist Chano O'Ferral, saxophonist Justo Almario, and trumpeter John Mosley, with guest appearances from Bruce Fisher and Stan Richardson on lead vocals, Ethel Beatty and Tony Gooden on backing vocals, and string contractor Kermit Moore.

The album peaked at number 48 on the Billboard Top LPs chart and at number 16 on the Top Soul LPs chart in the United States. Its lead single, "Get On Up, Get On Down", reached a peak position of No. 56 on the Hot Soul Singles chart.

== Critical reception ==
Professional ratings
Review scores
Source	Rating
AllMusic	3.5/5 stars

The Bay State Banner noted that "Ayers, the space cowboy of the r&b/disco scene, has come up with another excellent, all-bases-touched LP."

== Track listing ==
No.	Title	Writer(s)	Length
1.	"You Send Me"	Sam Cooke	8:28
2.	"I Wanna Touch You Baby"	Roy Ayers	4:23
3.	"Can't You See Me"	Ayers; Edwin Birdsong	6:58
4.	"Get On Up Get On Down"	Ayers; Bruce Fisher; Stan Richardson	4:24
5.	"Everytime I See You"	Onaje Allan Gumbs	3:38
6.	"Rhythm"	Ayers	4:50
7.	"And Don't You Say No"	Ayers; Carla Vaughn	3:24
8.	"It Ain't Your Sign It's Your Mind"	Ayers	3:07
Total length:			39:12

== Personnel ==
- Roy Ayers – vocals, vibraphone (tracks: 3, 5), electric piano (tracks: 1, 2, 4), piano & cowbell (track 6), arrangement, producer
- Carla Vaughn – vocals (tracks: 1–3, 5–7), producer
- Merry Clayton – lead vocals (track 3), backing vocals (tracks: 5–7)
- Stanley Richardson – lead vocals (track 4)
- Bruce Fisher – lead vocals (track 4)
- Ethel Beatty – backing vocals (track 4)
- Tony Gooden – backing vocals (track 8)
- Philip Woo – electric piano (tracks: 1, 3, 5–8), minimoog (track 2), ARP String Synthesizer (track 5)
- Harry Whitaker – piano (track 4)
- James Philip Mason – guitar (track 3)
- Chuck Anthony – electric guitar (tracks: 4, 5)
- William Henry Allen – bass (tracks: 1, 2, 4, 7), arrangement
- Kerry Turman – bass (tracks: 3, 5, 6, 8)
- José Ortiz – drums (track 2)
- Dennis Davis – drums (track 3)
- Kwame Steve Cobb – drums (track 4)
- Howard Terrance King – drums (track 5)
- Bernard Lee "Pretty" Purdie – drums (tracks: 6, 7)
- John Sussewell – drums (track 8)
- Chano O'Ferral – congas (tracks: 1, 3, 4, 8), backing vocals (track 8)
- Justo Almario – tenor saxophone (tracks: 3, 6)
- John Clifford Mosley Jr. – trumpet (tracks: 3, 6)
- Kermit Moore – strings (tracks: 1, 4)
- Michael Hutchinson – engineering
- Jerry Solomon – engineering
- Carla Bandini – assistant engineering
- Robert L. Heimall – design
- Joel Brodsky – photography

== Charts ==
Chart (1978)	Peak position
US Billboard 200	48
US Top R&B/Hip-Hop Albums (Billboard)	16
