= Stage (David Bowie album) =

1978 live album by David Bowie

Live album by David Bowie
- Released: 29 September 1978
- Recorded: 28–29 April, 5–6 May 1978
- Venues: The Spectrum, Philadelphia; Providence Civic Center, Providence; Boston Garden, Boston
- Genre: Rock
- Length: 73:17 (original LP release); 77:17 (1991 CD version); 85:31 (2005 CD reissue); 94:30 (2017 version)
- Label: RCA Victor
- Producers: David Bowie; Tony Visconti

David Bowie chronology
David Bowie Narrates Prokofiev's Peter and the Wolf (1978)	Stage (1978)	Lodger (1979)

Singles from Stage
- 1. "Breaking Glass" Released: 17 November 1978

Stage is the second live album by the English musician David Bowie. It was recorded on the American leg of the Isolar II Tour in 1978 and released through RCA Records later that year. Producer Tony Visconti recorded the songs live using close microphones, with little overdubs. He edited out crowd noise during songs to make it feel like a studio album, and he sequenced the songs in chronological release order rather than following the concert setlist. The content of the album features material mostly from Bowie's then-recent studio albums Low and "Heroes" (both 1977), and multiple songs from the Ziggy Stardust album (1972).

Stage was originally released in September 1978 during a break in the tour. A dispute between Bowie and RCA over its release later resulted in Bowie's departure from the label. The album reached No. 5 in the UK and No. 44 in the US. Critically, the album received mixed reviews, with many the song choices and non-live quality. Stage has been reissued multiple times with bonus tracks, including in 2005, with a tracklist that restored the running order from the tour. This release was received more positively.

== Background and recording ==
Stage was culled from concert recordings made during the US leg of the Isolar II world tour in late April and early May 1978. After being unsatisfied with his first live album David Live, Bowie enlisted producer Tony Visconti to record and mix a new live album. In the 2005 liner notes for Stage, Visconti explained: "My plan was to record this album very carefully as if it was a studio album." After plans to record the band's final two nights at Madison Square Garden in New York City fell through due to high fees, Visconti instead recorded two nights at The Spectrum in Philadelphia, Pennsylvania, on 28 and 29 April; one night at the Providence Civic Center in Providence, Rhode Island, on 5 May; and one night at the Boston Garden in Boston, Massachusetts, on 6 May.

Using RCA's mobile recording studio, Visconti placed microphones close to the instruments and around the venues; the ambient songs were recorded via a direct electronic feed from the instruments rather than through microphones. He later said that the album featured no overdubs, except for a splice edit used for "Station to Station": "The beginning and end are from Boston and the middle is from Providence." Visconti mixed the recordings at his own Good Earth Studios in London in May 1978 while the tour continued. During mixing, Visconti edited out most of the crowd noise: "I just used the audience tracks in the intros and endings to prove that they were there but cut them completely during the bulk of the recording." Additionally, the concert setlist was reorganised for the live album, favouring most of the upbeat tracks on the first side and the slower instrumentals on the second; side three of the original LP was composed entirely of instrumentals. According to Visconti, it was his idea that Bowie approved. The album's sleeve photo was taken by Gilles Riberolles.

== Content and personnel ==
The setlist for the Isolar II tour generally consisted of material from the previous year's albums, Low and "Heroes", with the second half of each performance opening with a seven-song sequence from The Rise and Fall of Ziggy Stardust and the Spiders from Mars album (1972), which were rearranged with a synthesiser-heavy sound. Three songs from Station to Station (1976) were played, while the only hit singles played were "The Jean Genie", "Rebel Rebel" and "Fame". Several songs from the set were removed for Stage's original 1978 release. These included "Be My Wife", "Stay", "The Jean Genie" and "Rock 'n' Roll Suicide".

The personnel for the tour and Stage included Bowie's core team of guitarist Carlos Alomar, drummer Dennis Davis and bassist George Murray. The remaining band members were ex-Frank Zappa sideman Adrian Belew on lead guitar; Simon House of Hawkwind on electric violin; Roger Powell, best known for his work with Todd Rundgren in Utopia, on keyboards; and Sean Mayes on piano.

== Release ==
Stage was released on 29 September 1978 during the four-month break in the tour while Bowie recorded Lodger in Switzerland. Stage was originally scheduled to be released in the summer but was delayed due to a label dispute between Bowie and RCA Records. Bowie had hoped Stage would qualify as a two-disc set in his contract but RCA disagreed as David Live, also a double LP, did not. RCA won and by the end of the year, Bowie decided he was not going to re-sign.

Commercially, Stage reached No. 5 in the UK and was subsequently certified gold by the British Phonographic Industry (BPI). However, it performed poorly in the US, reaching No. 44.

"Breaking Glass", which originally appeared in shorter form on Low, was released as the title track of a 3-track EP and reached number 54 on the UK singles chart. In the US, "Star" was also released as a 3-track EP, while in Japan "Soul Love" was released as a single with "Blackout" on the B-side; neither of these releases charted.

=== Rereleases ===
Stage was first released on CD in 1984 by RCA. A reissue in 1991 by Rykodisc followed, which featured the bonus track "Alabama Song". In 2005, a new reissue by EMI was released. For this release, Visconti cleaned up the production and restored the original tour's running order, reflecting the original setlist of the concerts as performed. Along with "Alabama Song", the 2005 version featured two new bonus tracks: "Stay" and "Be My Wife". It was also remixed in 5.1 surround sound and DTS audio, released on DVD-Audio the same year.

In 2017, Stage was included, in two versions, in the A New Career in a New Town (1977–1982) box set released by Parlophone. One version contained the original edition with the same list and ordering of tracks that had appeared on the original vinyl album; the other was a new version of the album, based on the 2005 edition but including two previously unreleased songs from the concerts. The latter was also released separately, in 2-CD and 3-LP formats, in 2018.

== Critical reception ==
Professional ratings
Review scores
Source	Rating
AllMusic	2/5 stars
Blender	2/5 stars
Christgau's Record Guide	B+
Encyclopedia of Popular Music	2/5 stars
NME	8/10
MusicHound	3/5
Pitchfork	7.9/10
The Rolling Stone Album Guide	3.5/5 stars
Select	4/5
Spin Alternative Record Guide	4/10
Uncut	3/5 stars

Stage received mixed reviews on its original release. Reviewing the album for Sounds magazine, Jon Savage gave Stage an overall positive review. He enjoyed the chronological flow of the track sequencing, writing that "[by] removing the bittiness and style-hopping that often plague double live albums, it makes the LP eminently playable, as a sort of handy greatest-hit-cum-alternate-take package." He also spoke highly of the performances, stating that "the playing and production which are so crystal clear that you mostly forget that what you're hearing is recorded live." However, he was critical of the absence of crowd noise, which he believed "abolishes the warts and rapport, or plain simple documentary fascination ... that characterise the best live albums."

In Creem, Jeffrey Morgan was more negative. He argued that Bowie was once a great songwriter who, since 1972, has been repeating himself with experimentation rather than writing meaningful songs. He also accused Bowie of using his legacy material, such as Ziggy, to sell Stage rather than move past it. Morgan felt Stage's best moments were the instrumentals and the album itself felt "made for TV". Robert Hilburn of the Los Angeles Times criticised the song choices as weak and clumsy but believed that the contrasting musical styles in the tracklist gave the album "a certain aura of artistic boldness". However, he felt the Ziggy material failed to live up to its studio counterparts and the recent material "[did] little to make his current musical direction more inviting", ultimately calling Stage a cash-grab. In a later review for the original LP, AllMusic's Stephen Thomas Erlewine criticised Stage for its non-live quality, saying "the performances are too direct and the recording is too crisp and clear", ultimately calling Stage a non-interesting curiosity.

In a review of the 1991 rerelease, Mat Snow of Q stated that "performances are faster than the studio originals and suffer for it; what they gain in live jauntiness – not exactly a quality they were crying out for – they lose in power and intensity." A 2005 reissue saw many of the criticisms of the original LP addressed. In his review of the reissue, Chris Roberts of Uncut said that the combination of material from Low and "Heroes", with songs from Ziggy Stardust, resulted in a live album that was an "eerie clattering between two stools". He said that the improvements in sound carried out by Tony Visconti and the addition of "Stay" and "the brilliant 'Be My Wife'" made the new version of Stage "essential for Dave-freaks, anyway". Nicholas Pegg writes that, whereas the original LP "demolish[ed] the dynamic of the original concerts", the 2005 version turns Stage into a live album of "remarkable impact". He writes that while it lacks the "tormented melodrama" of David Live and the "historical significance" of Ziggy Stardust: The Motion Picture (1983), the new version's "sheer [performance and production quality] make for an icily perfect memento of the 1978 tour". Thomas Jerome Seabrook writes that the original LP failed to capture the tour's experience due to poor track sequencing. However, he praised the 2005 version for superior production and sound quality and its additional tracks, but did find the absence of crowd noise during songs made one question if you were listening to a live album.

The album was included in The Quietus' 2013 list of its writers' "40 Favourite Live Albums".

== Track listings ==
=== Original 1978 LP ===
All tracks are written by David Bowie, except where noted.

Side one
No.	Title	Length
1.	"Hang On to Yourself"	3:26
2.	"Ziggy Stardust"	3:32
3.	"Five Years"	3:58
4.	"Soul Love"	2:55
5.	"Star"	2:31
Total length:		16:22

Side two
No.	Title	Length
1.	"Station to Station"	8:55
2.	"Fame" (Bowie, Carlos Alomar, John Lennon)	4:06
3.	"TVC 15"	4:37
Total length:		17:38

Side three
No.	Title	Length
1.	"Warszawa" (Bowie, Brian Eno)	6:50
2.	"Speed of Life"	2:44
3.	"Art Decade"	3:10
4.	"Sense of Doubt"	3:13
5.	"Breaking Glass" (Bowie, Dennis Davis, George Murray)	3:28
Total length:		19:25

Side four
No.	Title	Length
1.	"'Heroes'" (Bowie, Eno)	6:19
2.	"What in the World"	4:24
3.	"Blackout"	4:01
4.	"Beauty and the Beast"	5:08
Total length:		19:52 (73:17)

=== 1991 rerelease ===
All tracks are written by David Bowie, except where noted.

Disc one
No.	Title	Length
1.	"Hang On to Yourself"	3:26
2.	"Ziggy Stardust"	3:32
3.	"Five Years"	3:58
4.	"Soul Love"	2:55
5.	"Star"	2:31
6.	"Station to Station"	8:55
7.	"Fame" (Bowie, Alomar, Lennon)	4:06
8.	"TVC 15"	4:37
Total length:		34:00

Disc two
No.	Title	Length
1.	"Warszawa" (Bowie, Eno)	6:50
2.	"Speed of Life"	2:44
3.	"Art Decade"	3:10
4.	"Sense of Doubt"	3:13
5.	"Breaking Glass" (Bowie, Davis, Murray)	3:28
6.	"'Heroes'" (Bowie, Eno)	6:19
7.	"What in the World"	4:24
8.	"Blackout"	4:01
9.	"Beauty and the Beast"	5:08
10.	"Alabama Song" (Bonus Track) (Bertolt Brecht, Kurt Weill)	4:00
Total length:		43:17 (77:17)

=== 2005 rerelease ===
All tracks are written by David Bowie, except where noted.

Disc one
No.	Title	Length
1.	"Warszawa" (Bowie, Eno)	6:46
2.	"'Heroes'" (Bowie, Eno)	6:10
3.	"What in the World"	4:16
4.	"Be My Wife" (Previously unreleased)	2:35
5.	"Blackout"	3:52
6.	"Sense of Doubt"	3:07
7.	"Speed of Life"	2:39
8.	"Breaking Glass" (Bowie, Davis, Murray)	3:22
9.	"Beauty and the Beast"	5:00
10.	"Fame" (Bowie, Lennon, Alomar)	4:03
Total length:		41:50

Disc two
No.	Title	Length
1.	"Five Years"	3:58
2.	"Soul Love"	2:55
3.	"Star"	2:25
4.	"Hang On to Yourself"	3:21
5.	"Ziggy Stardust"	3:37
6.	"Art Decade"	3:01
7.	"Alabama Song" (Brecht, Weill)	3:55
8.	"Station to Station"	8:40
9.	"Stay" (Previously unreleased)	7:17
10.	"TVC 15"	4:32
Total length:		43:41 (85:31)

=== 2017 rerelease ===
All tracks are written by David Bowie, except where noted.

Disc one
No.	Title	Writer(s)	Length
1.	"Warszawa" (Bowie, Eno)		6:53
2.	"'Heroes'"	Bowie, Eno	6:19
3.	"What in the World"		4:25
4.	"Be My Wife"		2:49
5.	"The Jean Genie" (Previously unreleased)		6:17
6.	"Blackout"		4:00
7.	"Sense of Doubt"		3:07
8.	"Speed of Life"		2:40
9.	"Breaking Glass" (Bowie, Davis, Murray)		3:22
10.	"Beauty and the Beast"		5:06
11.	"Fame" (Bowie, Alomar, Lennon)		4:13
Total length:			49:11

Disc two
No.	Title	Length
1.	"Five Years"	3:57
2.	"Soul Love"	2:56
3.	"Star"	2:28
4.	"Hang On to Yourself"	3:22
5.	"Ziggy Stardust"	3:30
6.	"Suffragette City" (Previously unreleased)	3:58
7.	"Art Decade"	3:01
8.	"Alabama Song" (Brecht, Weill)	3:55
9.	"Station to Station"	8:43
10.	"Stay"	7:21
11.	"TVC 15"	4:36
Total length:		47:51 (94:30)

== Personnel ==
According to author Roger Griffin:

- David Bowie – vocals, keyboards
- Carlos Alomar – rhythm guitar, backing vocals
- George Murray – bass guitar, backing vocals
- Dennis Davis – drums, percussion
- Adrian Belew – lead guitar, backing vocals
- Simon House – electric violin
- Sean Mayes – piano, string synthesizer, backing vocals
- Roger Powell – keyboards, backing vocals

== Charts ==
Weekly chart performance for Stage
Year	Chart	Peak Position
1978	Australian Albums (Kent Music Report)	14
1978	Dutch Albums (Album Top 100)	2
1978	Italian Albums (Musica e dischi)	24
1978	New Zealand Albums (RMNZ)	1
1978	Norwegian Albums (VG-lista)	18
1978	Swedish Albums (Sverigetopplistan)	29
1978	UK Albums (Official Charts)	5
1978	US Billboard Top LPs & Tape	44
2005	French Albums (SNEP)	162
2018	Greek Album Chart	68
2018	Hungarian Albums (MAHASZ)	33
2025	Croatian International Albums (HDU)	6

== Certifications and sales ==
Certifications and sales for Stage
Region	Certification	Certified units/sales
New Zealand (RMNZ)	Gold	7,500^{^}
United Kingdom (BPI)	Gold	100,000^{^}
^{^} Shipments figures based on certification alone.
