= Soul Love (David Bowie song) =

- Cover of 1978 live Japanese release, b/w "Blackout"

Song by David Bowie

from the album The Rise and Fall of Ziggy Stardust and the Spiders from Mars
- Released: 16 June 1972
- Recorded: 12 November 1971
- Studio: Trident, London
- Length: 3:33
- Label: RCA
- Songwriter: David Bowie
- Producers: David Bowie; Ken Scott

"Soul Love" is a song by the English singer-songwriter David Bowie from his 1972 album The Rise and Fall of Ziggy Stardust and the Spiders from Mars. Co-produced by Bowie and Ken Scott, it features Bowie's backing band known as the Spiders from Mars – Mick Ronson, Trevor Bolder and Mick Woodmansey. It was recorded on 12 November 1971 at Trident Studios in London and features a saxophone solo from Bowie and a guitar solo from Ronson. Lyrically, the song is about numerous characters dealing with love before the impending disaster that will destroy Earth as described in the album's opening track "Five Years". Like most tracks on the album, the song was rewritten to fit the Ziggy Stardust narrative.

The song has received positive reviews from music critics, with many praising Ronson's guitar work and Bowie's saxophone solo. Bowie rarely performed the song live, only on occasion during the Ziggy Stardust and the Serious Moonlight tours, but was a regular on the Isolar II Tour. The song, along with its parent album, was remastered in 2012 for its 40th anniversary and was re-released on the Five Years (1969–1973) box set in 2015.

== Composition and lyrics ==
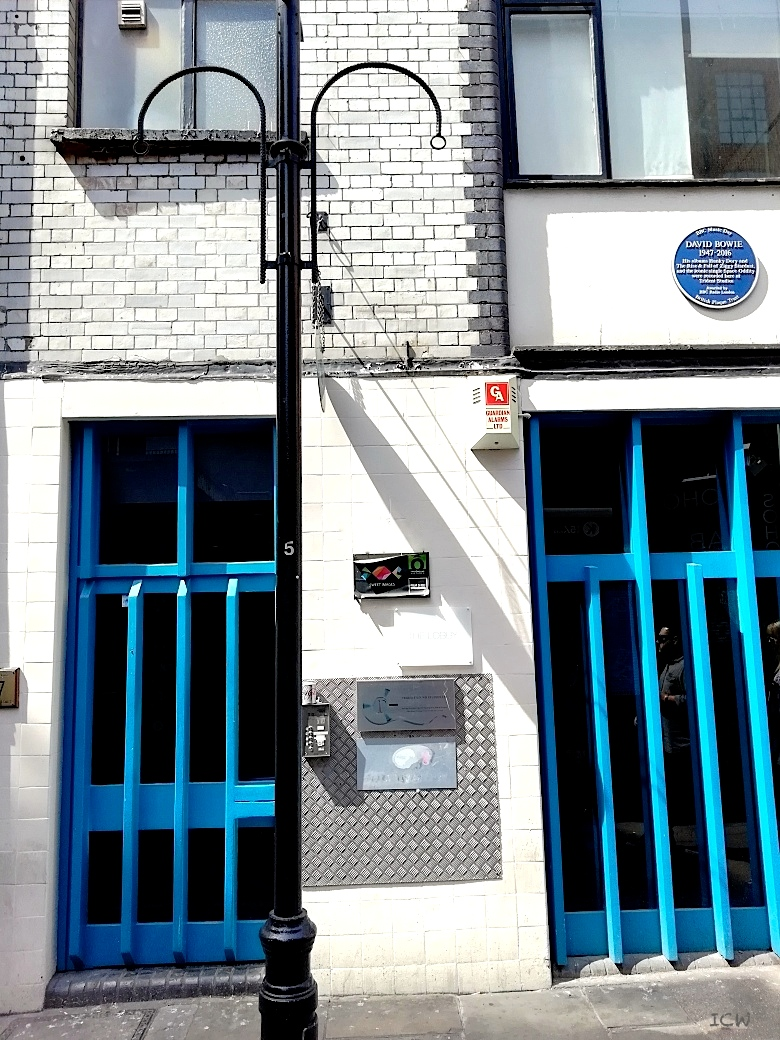
The former Trident Studios building at St Anne's Court in Soho (pictured in 2018), where "Soul Love" was recorded.

David Bowie recorded "Soul Love" on 12 November 1971 at Trident Studios in London. Co-produced by Bowie and Ken Scott, the lineup consisted of Bowie's backing band known as the Spiders from Mars – comprising guitarist Mick Ronson, bassist Trevor Bolder and drummer Mick Woodmansey.

Biographer Nicholas Pegg notes that the song acknowledges Bowie's formative years, calling the riff reminiscent of "Stand by Me" by Ben E. King. Like most songs on the album, the song was not initially written with the Ziggy concept. After being rewritten to fit the narrative, "Soul Love" pertains to numerous characters dealing with love before the impending disaster that will destroy Earth as described in the album opener "Five Years". Author Marc Spitz notes that the track has a sense of "pre-apocalypse frustration" to it. Whereas "Soul Love" features a hand-clap rhythm, both it and "Five Years" share similar drum rhythms and vocal progressions, leading biographer Chris O'Leary to believe that the two tracks were written around the same time. He also states that both tracks act as a "prelude" to the true introduction of the Ziggy Stardust character on "Moonage Daydream". Author Peter Doggett writes that Bowie's voice sounds reminiscent of his 1977 album Low: dull, jaded, depressed and "sapped" of vitality. Other than the rare exception of "Lady Grinning Soul" from Aladdin Sane (1973), Bowie rarely used the word "soul" in his vocabulary, mainly due to his belief that the soul is vulnerable to "unwelcome claimants", as well as soulfulness being a common theme in rock music.

Doggett notes that following the "panoramic vision" of "Five Years", "Soul Love" offers a more "optimistic" landscape, with bongos and acoustic guitar indicating "mellow fruitfulness." The characters include a mother grieving at her son's grave, the son's love of the ideal for which he died (which parallels Mary grieving at Jesus's tomb), a pair of young lovers believing in "new words", and the love of "God on high". However, according to Pegg, the lyrics have a "nihilistic undercurrent" and a "cynical re-reading" of love that contrasts sharply with Bowie's previous songs: "he rails against 'idiot love' which 'descends on those defenseless' and bleakly concludes that 'love is not loving'." Also present are themes that reflect Bowie's disdain for institutions and causes, such as the dead son that "gave his life to save the slogan", which reprises the theme of futility previously found in his 1969 song "Cygnet Committee", and prefigures "Tony went to fight in Belfast" later found in the song "Star". The lyrics also feature a priest that previously appeared in "Five Years", here "tastes the word" amid "the blindness that surrounds him", recollecting the "bullshit faith" of Bowie's 1971 song "Quicksand", which clears the way for a secularised "church of man, love" (or "church of man-love") found in "Moonage Daydream".

Musically, "Soul Love" is primarily in the key of G major. While primarily in 4/4 common time, one 2/4 bar appears between the verses. It opens with Woodmansey on drums playing rapid eighth notes on a closed hi-hat with a "kick-rimshot-kick" pattern, "garnished" by handclaps and congas. On a 12-string acoustic guitar, Bowie "mut[es] a strum on the third of every four strokes", while Bolder plays a bassline influenced by Latin music. Bowie showcases a rising vocal progression throughout. He starts the first verse on D ("stone") before going up to G ("brave") and ends on a higher-octave D. When mentioning the priest, he goes to A major. In the refrains, Bowie starts on E major before swapping to E minor ("sweeping over"), moving up to a dominant C major chord ("defenseless", "inspirations") before going down a minor again to C minor ("all I have"), ending the choruses on E♭. Bowie also has a baritone saxophone solo after the second verse, which Doggett calls "relaxing". During the solo, Bowie "reverses" the upper melody and plays around it from there. For Ronson's ending guitar solo, he plays Bowie's verse-melody almost note-for-note before Bowie sings out to close the track.

== Release and reception ==
"Soul Love" was released on 16 June 1972 by RCA Records on Bowie's fifth studio album The Rise and Fall of Ziggy Stardust and the Spiders from Mars, sequenced as the second track between "Five Years" and "Moonage Daydream". Since release, the song has received positive reviews from music critics, with many praising Ronson's guitar work and Bowie's saxophone solo. In his book The Complete David Bowie, Pegg calls the track "sublimely melodic", giving praise to the "tight" guitar work and "charming" saxophone solo, writing "[it provides] a perfect bridge between the apocalyptic foreboding of 'Five Years' and the glam meltdown of 'Moonage Daydream'." Doggett calls the track musically stunning, praising Ronson's guitar work. He further praises the backing vocals, writing "[they wailed like harpies", and compliments Bowie's vocal performance, noting the presence of Ziggy himself in the chorus.

When reviewing the 30th anniversary edition of Ziggy Stardust in 2002, Daryl Easlea of Record Collector called "Soul Love" one of Bowie's "greatest moments". Ned Raggett of AllMusic gave the song a positive review, complimenting Bowie's vocal performance, calling it "defiantly arch", his saxophone solo, and praises Ronson's guitar work, writing, "his concluding solo is as perfect an example of glam-god glory as anything." He identifies the "suddenly storming" choruses as the standout and notes the track as reminiscent of Bowie's previous album Hunky Dory. He ultimately called the song an "enjoyable listen", even if it's not quite connected to the overall theme of the album. Ian Fortnam of Classic Rock, when ranking every track on the album from worst to best, ranked the song at number ten (out of eleven), writing, "[the song] is significantly perkier than its portentous "Five Years" predecessor, but still sparkles with gorgeously under-stated Mick Ronson guitar details, Bowie's light and reedy sax break and an inspirational lyric highlighting love's all-pervasive carelessness."

== Legacy ==
"Soul Love" only made a few appearances on the Ziggy Stardust Tour, being played during the US portion of the tour. He revived the song for the 1978 Isolar II Tour; performances from this tour have appeared on the live albums Stage (1978) and Welcome to the Blackout (2018). The Stage version, which Pegg calls "excellent", was released as a single in Japan. Bowie also performed it on the first two shows of the Serious Moonlight Tour. The song, along with the rest of its parent album, was remastered in 2012 for its 40th anniversary and was re-released on the Five Years (1969–1973) box set in 2015.

== Personnel ==
Personnel per biographers Kevin Cann and Chris O'Leary.

- David Bowie – lead and backing vocals, acoustic guitar, saxophone
- Mick Ronson – lead and rhythm guitar, backing vocals
- Trevor Bolder – bass guitar
- Mick Woodmansey – drums, congas

Production

- David Bowie – producer
- Ken Scott – producer
