= Five Years (David Bowie song) =

Song by David Bowie

from the album The Rise and Fall of Ziggy Stardust and the Spiders from Mars
- Released: 16 June 1972
- Recorded: 15 November 1971
- Studio: Trident, London
- Genre: Glam rock; art rock
- Length: 4:43
- Label: RCA
- Songwriter: David Bowie
- Producers: David Bowie; Ken Scott

"Five Years" is a song by the English musician David Bowie, released on his 1972 album The Rise and Fall of Ziggy Stardust and the Spiders from Mars. Co-produced by Bowie and Ken Scott, it was recorded in November 1971 at Trident Studios in London with his backing band the Spiders from Mars − comprising Mick Ronson, Trevor Bolder and Mick Woodmansey. As the opening track on the album, the song introduces the overarching theme of the album: an impending apocalyptic disaster will destroy Earth in five years and the being who will save it is an alien rock star named Ziggy Stardust. While the first two verses are told from a child narrator's perspective, the third is from Bowie's, who addresses the listener directly. As the track progresses, it builds intensity, before climaxing with strings and Bowie screaming the title.

Since release, "Five Years" has received critical acclaim from music critics, with the majority complimenting Bowie's songwriting and Woodmansey's drum track. It has since been regarded as one of Bowie's greatest songs and by some commentators as one of the greatest opening tracks of all time. Bowie performed the song frequently throughout the Ziggy Stardust, 1976 Isolar, 1978 Stage and 2003 Reality tours. It has been remastered multiple times, including in 2012 for its 40th anniversary; this remaster was later included on the box set Five Years (1969–1973) in 2015, which took its title from this song.

== Composition and lyrics ==
"Five Years" was recorded on 15 November 1971 at Trident Studios in London. Co-produced by Ken Scott, Bowie recorded it with his backing band known as the Spiders from Mars − comprising guitarist Mick Ronson, bassist Trevor Bolder and drummer Mick Woodmansey. It begins with a "slow-quick-quick" drumbeat from Woodmansey that creates an "ominous" atmosphere before Bowie begins his vocals. Author David Buckley describes the drum pattern as "heartbeat-like". The opening line, "Pushing through the market square", likely refers to the Aylesbury market square in Buckinghamshire, England. Biographers Nicholas Pegg and Peter Doggett both note the track's building intensity, especially in Bowie's vocal performance – moving from calm to screaming, as reminiscent of English musician John Lennon's 1970 solo album John Lennon/Plastic Ono Band, particularly on its opening track "Mother". Unlike Lennon's basic arrangements on that album, "Five Years" contains autoharp before adding acoustic guitar and strings at the second verse. According to Doggett, "by the finale, the orchestral players were fighting for air against amplified guitar static, scraping despairingly at their own instruments while the last of the human race screamed around them."

The lyrics break the news that the Earth only has five years left before it gets destroyed by an impending apocalyptic disaster. The first two verses are from the point of view of a kid, who hears this news for the first time and goes numb as it sinks in. Like the rest of the album, Bowie uses American slang and pronunciations, including "news guy" and "cop" (instead of "newsreader" or "policeman", respectively). In Ziggyology, Simon Goddard also cites the influence of On the Road by Jack Kerouac, one of Bowie's favourite books which contains the similar line "woulda killed him if they hadn't drug me off". By the third verse, Bowie addresses the listener directly, which was a rarity in rock lyrics at the time. Bowie observes us blissfully unaware of our fate through "jump cuts" of urban decay, including in fantasies of Americana using stereotypes: – the Cadillac, the "black", the "queer" and a girl carelessly enjoying a milkshake in an ice cream parlor. According to Bowie, "we don't even know we're being sung about." Because of this, Bowie proclaims that he "feels like an actor" and "with a flock of misfits and minorities gathering around him," he declares "I want you to walk", indirectly introducing the character of Ziggy Stardust, a bisexual alien rock star who will save the Earth from the impending disaster, who is introduced directly in the third track "Moonage Daydream". Pegg writes: "It's a classic example of the dexterity and economy of Bowie's best songwriting: with its scant few lines 'Five Years' drips with implication." The track ends with Bowie screaming the title as the Spiders join in, transforming the "histrionics" into "jolly pub chant." It fades out with the same drumbeat as the beginning, which "allows the listener to catch his or her breath" before another beat begins the next track, "Soul Love".

Later in the 1970s, Bowie claimed to have chosen the length of time, five years, as a result of a dream in which his deceased father told him he must never fly again and would die in five years, in response to a question about his fear of flying. Pegg notes another inspiration for the track is a poem Bowie had kept as part of his cabaret act in 1968: Roger McGough's "At Lunchtime A Story of Love", which tells the story of a "sexual abandon" that erupts on a bus when news arrives that the world will end at lunchtime. It contains imagery that Bowie adapted for "Five Years": the bus suddenly stops "to avoid a mother and child in the road", while the bus conductor strikes up "some sort of relationship with the driver." Spitz and Doggett both note the thematic resemblance to American singer-songwriter Bob Dylan's 1963 song "A Hard Rain's a-Gonna Fall", which also describes an impending disaster. In 1973, Bowie elaborated on the scenario described in "Five Years" in an interview with Rolling Stone:

It has been announced that the world will end because of lack of natural resources. Ziggy is in a position where all the kids have access to things that they thought they wanted. The older people have lost all touch with reality and the kids are left on their own to plunder anything. Ziggy was in a rock'n'roll band and the kids no longer want rock'n'roll. There's no electricity to play it. Ziggy's adviser tells him to collect news and sing it, 'cause there is no news. So Ziggy does this and there is terrible news.

In The Complete David Bowie, Pegg attributes Bowie's "half-sung, half-spoken" vocal performance to American musician Lou Reed of the Velvet Underground, notes that the "gathering omens of doom" are similar to the William Shakespeare play Julius Caesar, and directly correlates the "violent images of societal breakdown" to The War of the Worlds and The Day of the Triffids. He believes these violent images signals essence in Bowie's new subject matter: "human longing and bruised relationships, expressed in the poignantly tacky idiom of British sci-fi." He further writes that the theatrical process of "dissimulation" mirrors Bowie's own sense of alienation, noting that on his previous album Hunky Dory, he was "living in a silent film", but now "feels like an actor" as, "Frankenstein-like", he breathes life into his new creation: Ziggy Stardust.

In his 2016 book On Bowie, Rob Sheffield addresses the common supposition that the repeated line "My brain hurts a lot" in the chorus might be a reference to the "Gumby Brain Specialist" sketch on the satirical television show Monty Python's Flying Circus. The sketch first aired in November 1972, a full year after "Five Years" was recorded.

== Release and reception ==
"Five Years" was released as the opening track on Bowie's fifth studio album The Rise and Fall of Ziggy Stardust and the Spiders from Mars on 16 June 1972 by RCA Records. The song has received critical acclaim from music critics, with the majority complimenting Bowie's songwriting and Woodmansey's drum track. Multiple critics have called it one of the greatest opening tracks of all time. Stephen Thomas Erlewine of AllMusic writes that "Five Years", along with "Lady Stardust" and "Rock 'n' Roll Suicide", "have a grand sense of staged drama previously unheard of in rock & roll." Ned Raggett, also of AllMusic, described the track as "easily one of the greatest album-opening songs ever". He praises the song's ability to introduce the album concept as a whole and argues that it stands out on its own as well. He further names Bowie's vocal performance as one of his greatest, particularly calling out his delivery of the line "I never thought there'd be so many people". Pegg also described the track as one of the album's finest songs and, with the opening drumbeat, has "earned a place in rock history as one of the all-time classic album openings." Writers of Rolling Stone, in The Rolling Stone Album Guide, similarly describe "Five Years" as "one of the all-time great album openers," continuing: "with doomy drums and a chanting choir to announce the end of the world and the dawn of the new Bowie era." Ian Fortnam of Classic Rock, when ranking every track on the album from worst to best, placed the song at number three, praising Bowie's ability to speak directly to the listener and bring them into the "heart of the narrative." He believed the lyric regarding "[seeing] you in an ice cream parlor" sparked a connection between Bowie and a teenaged constituency that would "last a lifetime." He concluded saying: "As hairs involuntarily rose on the back of countless necks, Bowie's enduring star was born." Reviewing the album for its 40th anniversary, Jordan Blum of PopMatters praised Bowie's songwriting, calling the melody and harmonies "superbly restrained and affective". He writes that although Bowie would explore a similar concept on 1974's Diamond Dogs, "he never expressed it with more straightforward desperation than he does here."

"Five Years" has since been called one of Bowie's greatest songs by multiple publications, including by Mojo magazine, who listed it as his 26th best track in 2015. Following Bowie's death in 2016, Rolling Stone listed "Five Years" as one of his 30 essential songs. Ultimate Classic Rock, in their list of Bowie's ten best songs, listed "Five Years" at number nine, calling it an "epic opening to Bowie's greatest album". They continued: "Lyrically, it paints one of Bowie's most vivid pictures in a song, while musically it builds into a chaotic crescendo highlighted by the ominous sense of panic in Bowie's voice during its climax." In 2018, NME listed it as Bowie's 12th greatest song. The same publication placed the song at number 500 in their list of the 500 Greatest Songs of All Time in 2014.

== Live versions and legacy ==
Bowie recorded "Five Years" for the BBC radio programme Sounds of the 70s: Bob Harris on 18 January 1972 and this performance was broadcast on 7 February 1972. In 2000, this recording was released on the Bowie at the Beeb album. Bowie performed the song on Old Grey Whistle Test on 8 February 1972. This performance, broadcast on television later the same day, is included on the DVD version of Best of Bowie.

The 1972 Bowie song, "All the Young Dudes", is said to reference the song. According to an interview Bowie gave to Rolling Stone magazine in 1973, the boys are carrying the same news that the newscaster was carrying in "Five Years"; the news being the fact that the Earth had only five years left to live. Bowie explains: "'All the Young Dudes' is a song about this news. It's no hymn to the youth, as people thought. It is completely the opposite."

Bowie performed the song frequently throughout the Ziggy Stardust, 1976 Isolar and 1978 Stage tours. Performances from these tours have been released on Live Santa Monica '72, Live Nassau Coliseum '76, in a medley with "Life on Mars?", as well as Stage and Welcome to the Blackout, respectively. The track was to be the closing number of Bowie's 1985 Live Aid set at London's Wembley Stadium but was dropped the day before the concert to allow time for the broadcast of the famous appeal video featuring "Drive" by the Cars as its soundtrack. The song was not performed again by Bowie until his 2003 Reality Tour. A performance from November of that year was included on the A Reality Tour DVD and the album of the same title. The track was performed by Bowie with Arcade Fire at the 2005 Fashion Rocks concert in New York as well as "Life On Mars?" and Arcade Fire's own song "Wake Up".

The song, along with the entire Ziggy Stardust album, has been remastered multiple times, including in 1990 by Rykodisc, and in 2012 for its 40th anniversary. The 2012 remaster and a 2003 remix by producer Ken Scott were included in the box set Five Years (1969–1973) in 2015, which took its title from this song. "Five Years" was also used in the title of the BBC2 documentary David Bowie – Five Years – The Making of an Icon in 2013.

The song was inspiration for the 2018 pre-apocalypse television show Hard Sun. The song was covered by the English new wave band Duran Duran in 2021, marking the fifth anniversary of Bowie's death.

== Personnel ==
Personnel per Kevin Cann and Chris O'Leary.

- David Bowie – lead vocals, 12-string acoustic guitar
- Mick Ronson – piano, autoharp, electric guitar, backing vocals, string arrangements
- Trevor Bolder – bass
- Mick Woodmansey – drums
