= Roy Carr =

English music journalist (1945–2018)

- Born: 1945; Blackpool, Lancashire, England
- Died: 1 July 2018 (aged 73)
- Occupations: Journalist, writer, editor
- Known for: Editor of New Musical Express

Roy Carr (1945 – 1 July 2018) was an English music journalist, covering pop, rock and jazz. He joined the New Musical Express (NME) in the late 1960s, and edited NME, Vox and Melody Maker magazines.

== Biography ==
Born in Blackpool, Lancashire, after his family moved there from London during the Second World War, he was the son of jazz musician and composer Tony Carr, a member of Joe Loss's band and writer of "March of the Mods".

Roy Carr started his music career as a member of Blackpool-based band The Executives, who also featured Glenn Cornick. The band supported many leading acts in the mid-1960s, including the Beatles, the Rolling Stones and The Who, and had several unsuccessful singles issued on the Columbia and CBS labels. Carr became friendly with many leading musicians, including John Lennon; in 1969, when working with a local promoter in Toronto, Carr reported on Lennon's appearance at the Toronto Rock and Roll Revival.

After first starting to write reviews for Jazz News and the NME in the early 1960s, he joined the NME staff in 1970. He contributed as reviewer, interviewer and columnist to the magazine's relaunch later in the decade under editors Alan Smith and Nick Logan. During the 1980s and 1990s Carr compiled the majority of free tape and CD compilations that were given away with music magazines such as NME, Vox and Melody Maker, including the influential C86 cassette compilation. Carr also worked as a broadcaster, record producer, and writer of album liner notes. His career as a music journalist and magazine editor continued until his official retirement in 2006, in later years contributing as a freelance writer to jazz magazines.

His health deteriorated after the sudden death of his son in 2013. Carr died of a heart attack in hospital on 1 July 2018, aged 73.

== Bibliography ==
Carr's books as author or co-author include:

- The Beatles: An Illustrated Record (1975), with Tony Tyler
- The Rolling Stones: An Illustrated Record (1976)
- Fleetwood Mac: Rumours n' Fax (1979), with Steve Clarke
- David Bowie: An Illustrated Record (1981), with Charles Shaar Murray
- Elvis Presley: The Illustrated Record (1982), with Mick Farren
- The Hip: Hipsters, Jazz and the Beat Generation (1987), with Brian Case and Fred Dellar
- Jazz on CD (1995), with Tony Russell
- Beatles at the Movies (1996)
- A Century of Jazz (1997)
- A Talk On the Wild Side (2010)
