= George Murray (musician) =

American bass guitarist

George Murray is an American bass guitarist best known for his work with David Bowie on a number of Bowie's albums released in the 1970s. Murray was part of Bowie's rhythm section, the D.A.M. Trio, for five years from 1975 to 1980, alongside drummer Dennis Davis and guitarist Carlos Alomar.

He studied at Bronx Community College and had toured Europe, South America and Canada with George McCrae as well as touring and performing with the Broadway plays Don't Bother Me, I Can't Cope and Your Arms Too Short to Box with God, prior to his work with Bowie.

As of 2017 Murray works at a school district in California where he lives with his wife, Teresa Woo-Murray, and son, Marcus.

In 2025 Carlos Alomar put together a new touring band. This band consisted of Alomar, George Murray, Kevin Armstrong, Tal Bergman, Michael Cunio, Lea Lórien and Alex Tosca. The aim was to honour David Bowie and Dennis Davis. The D.A.M. trilogy B2B (Back to Berlin) played "only the fast tracks" from Bowie's "Berlin Trilogy" (Low, Heroes and Lodger) as well as encores from Station To Station and Scary Monsters, starting a European tour in Berlin's Metropol on Friday 7th November 2025.

== Selective discography ==
Weldon Irvine

- Cosmic Vortex - Justice Divine (1974)
- In Harmony (1974)

David Bowie

- Station to Station (1976)
- Live Nassau Coliseum '76 (released 2010)
- Low (1977)
- "Heroes" (1977)
- Stage (1978)
- Welcome to the Blackout (Live London '78) (released 2018)
- Lodger (1979)
- Scary Monsters (And Super Creeps) (1980)

Iggy Pop

- The Idiot (1977)

Jerry Harrison

- The Red and the Black (1981)

== Links ==
2017 video interview with George Murray
