= Dennis Davis =

American drummer, session musician and songwriter (1951–2016)

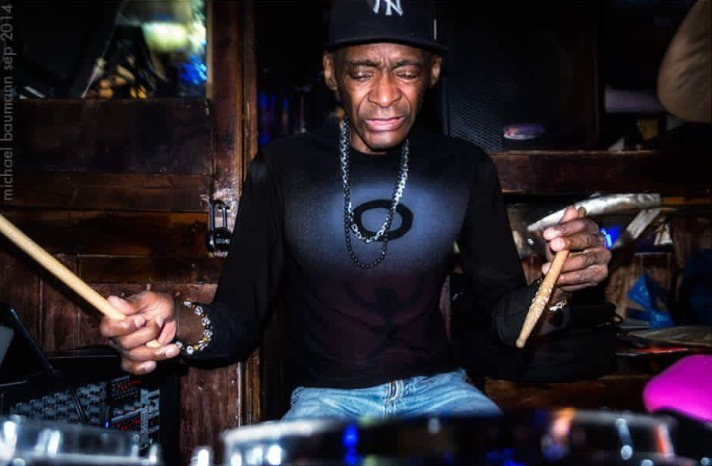

Background information
- Born: August 28, 1951; New York City, New York
- Died: April 6, 2016 (aged 64)
- Genres: R&B; soul; funk; rock; jazz
- Occupation: Musician
- Instruments: Drums; percussion

Dennis Davis (August 28, 1951 – April 6, 2016) was an American drummer and session musician. He is best known for work with jazz musician Roy Ayers from the 1970s to early 2000s, and English rock singer David Bowie from 1975 to 1980 on some of Bowie's most critically acclaimed works.

== Early life and military service ==
Davis was born and raised in Manhattan, New York City, and studied with drummers Max Roach and Elvin Jones before joining the Clark Terry Big Band in 1967. He joined the U.S. Navy and served on the USS Rowan (DD-782) from 1969 to 1970 during the Vietnam War. He was discharged from the U.S Navy in 1970 in San Diego, California. He was wounded during his military service, but was able to hone his skills when he performed as part of the US Navy's Drum and Bugle Corps.

== Career ==
Davis met guitarist Carlos Alomar when they were both playing with Roy Ayers. Davis was hired by David Bowie in 1974 for two tracks on Young Americans. Alomar, Davis and George Murray formed the "D.A.M. Trio" rhythm section which performed on seven successive albums released by Bowie in the 1970s, all of which are regarded as amongst the artist's best. Davis also played on three live albums recorded during that period, two of which were released after Bowie's death. The snare sound used on Bowie's Low album is considered influential on many later records. It was the result of early pitch shifting technology coupled with Davis's sensitive touch as a performer. In the late seventies Davis also teamed up with Stevie Wonder and worked on four albums over the following decade. In the early 2000s, he played percussion on David Bowie's live tours, including the artist's last, A Reality Tour, in 2003. The drummer for that band was Sterling Campbell, who was previously a student of Davis.

== Death, tributes and sons ==
Davis died on April 6, 2016, of cancer. His youngest son, Hikaru Davis, made a series of interview videos from 2016 to 2019 speaking with musicians who knew his father. When interviewed, Tony Visconti played Davis' drum and "thunderous" conga tracks from "Look Back in Anger", periodically exclaiming "great!", "amazing!", "that's killer!", and noting that Davis "plays so many things at once... and yet it doesn't sound busy". The accompanying review says that Davis is "that most perfect of drummers too: endlessly inventive, yet never gets in the way of the funk." T-Bone Motta, an older son, has been the drummer for Public Enemy since 2012. In April 2016, The New Yorker reported that Davis was commemorated at a live music evening at Paris Blues bar in Harlem alongside Prince.

== Selective discography ==
With Roy Ayers

- Red, Black and Green (1973)
- Coffy (1973)
- Virgo Red (1973)
- A Tear to a Smile (1975)
- Vibrations (1976)
- Step in to Our Life (1978)
- You Send Me (1978) – "Can't You See Me"
- No Stranger to Love (1979)
- I'm the One for Your Love Tonight (1987)
- Wake Up (1989)
- Double Trouble (1992)
- Good Vibrations (1993)
- The Essential Groove – Live (1994)
- Naste′ (1995)
- Mahogany Vibe (2004)

With George Benson

- Good King Bad (1975) – "Shell of a Man"
- Pacific Fire (1983)

With David Bowie

- Young Americans (1975) – "Across the Universe", "Fame"
- Station to Station (1976)
- Low (1977)
- "Heroes" (1977)
- Stage (1978)
- Lodger (1979)
- Scary Monsters (1980)
- Live Nassau Coliseum '76 (2017)
- Welcome to the Blackout (Live London '78) (2018)
- Live in Berlin [1978] L.P. (2018)
- I'm Only Dancing (The Soul Tour 74) (2020)

With Zachary Breaux

- Groovin (1992)

With Ronnie Foster

- Cheshire Cat (1975)
- Love Satellite (1978)
- Delight (1979)

With Jermaine Jackson

- Let's Get Serious (1980) – "Let's Get Serious", "Where Are You Now", "You're Supposed to Keep Your Love for Me"

With Garland Jeffreys

- Guts for Love (1982)

With Iggy Pop

- The Idiot (1977)

With Smokey Robinson

- Where There's Smoke... (1979) – "I Love the Nearness of You"

With Stevie Wonder

- Journey Through "The Secret Life of Plants" (1979) – "A Seed's a Star/Tree Medley"
- Hotter than July (1980) – "Did I Hear You Say You Love Me", "As If You Read My Mind", "Master Blaster (Jammin')"
- Original Musiquarium I (1982) – "Do I Do"
- Characters (Motown, 1987) – "Free" with Jephté Guillaume & the Tet Kale Orkestra
