= D.J. (David Bowie song) =

1979 song by David Bowie

- US single

Single by David Bowie

from the album Lodger
- B-side: "Repetition"
- Released: 29 June 1979
- Recorded: September 1978; March 1979
- Studio: Mountain (Montreux); Record Plant (New York City)
- Genre: New wave
- Length: 3:59 (album); 3:20 (single)
- Label: RCA
- Songwriters: David Bowie; Brian Eno; Carlos Alomar
- Producers: David Bowie; Tony Visconti

David Bowie singles chronology
"Boys Keep Swinging" (1979)	"D.J." (1979)	"Yassassin" (1979)

Music video
- "D.J." on YouTube

"D.J." is a song by the English musician David Bowie, released on 29 June 1979 as the second single from his 1979 album Lodger. It was written by Bowie, Brian Eno and Carlos Alomar and recorded in Montreux and New York City in September 1978 and March 1979. A cynical comment on the cult of the DJ, the track includes a guitar solo by Adrian Belew, which was recorded in multiple takes, and then mixed back together for the album track. Bowie mimics David Byrne of Talking Heads in his vocal performance. Its accompanying music video, directed by David Mallet, features Bowie casually walking down London's Earl's Court Road as passersby recognise him and follow him, interjected with Bowie as the tortured DJ destroying his studio. The single charted at number 29 in the UK and has received positive reviews.

== Recording ==
"D.J." was written by David Bowie, multi-instrumentalist Brian Eno and guitarist Carlos Alomar during the sessions for Lodger (1979); its original working title was "I Bit You Back". Co-produced by Bowie and Tony Visconti, the backing track was recorded at Mountain Studios in Montreux, Switzerland in September 1978, while vocals and overdubs were completed at the Record Plant in New York City in March 1979. The sessions saw Bowie and Eno utilise techniques from Eno's Oblique Strategies cards. According to biographer Chris O'Leary, these cards were "part-fortune cookie, part-Monopoly 'Chance' cards", intended to spark creative ideas. Eno and Bowie used them previously to create some of the instrumentals for "Heroes" (1977). Future King Crimson guitarist Adrian Belew contributed lead guitar, which was composited from multiple takes. He later told biographer David Buckley that it "goes through a whole mismatch of different guitar sounds almost like you're changing channel on the radio and each channel has a different guitar solo on it."

== Music and lyrics ==
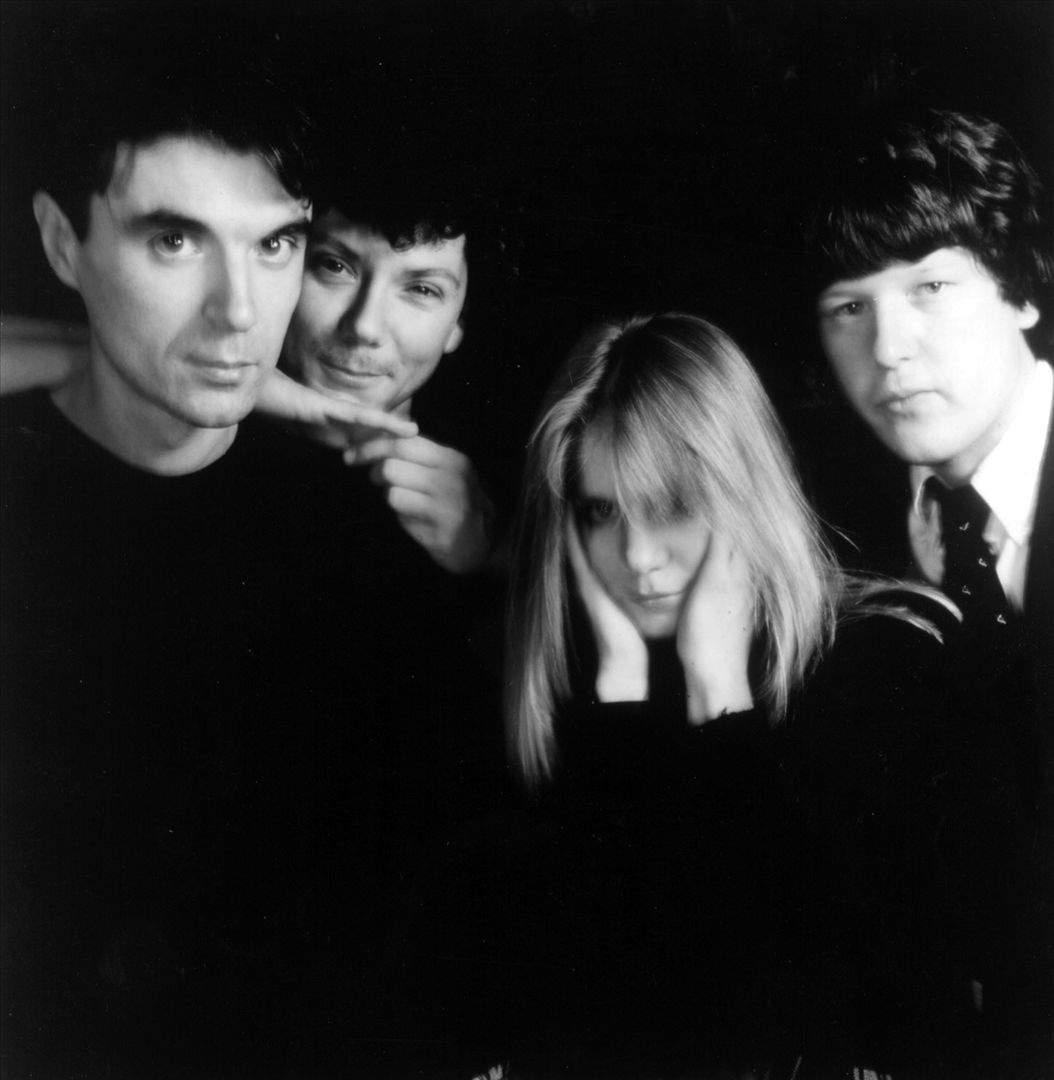
"DJ" musically alludes to the style of Talking Heads, particularly through Bowie's vocals.

"D.J." takes a sardonic look at the world of the disc jockey. On the song, the DJ is looked at solely for what he is on the outside: "I am a DJ, I am what I play". Swiftly compared by biographers to Elvis Costello's "Radio Radio" (1978), writer Ian Mathers described the song as "a horror story about a human being reduced to nothing more than work." Bowie described the song in a 1979 radio interview: "This is somewhat cynical but it's my natural response to disco. The DJ is the one who is having ulcers now, not the executives, because if you do the unthinkable thing of putting a record on in a disco not in time, that's it. If you have thirty seconds' silence, your whole career is over." Biographer Nicholas Pegg and author Peter Doggett note that the song has the same initials as Bowie's actual name—David Jones.

The song's primary key is in A minor, with a "neurotic compulsion" to move to A major. In the song's original mix, the bass, drums and rhythm guitar parts are noticeably pushed to the background, the last being encased with an Envelope phaser. The violin copies the vocal part in the first verse, after which it is run through, and at times replaced by, an EMS synthesiser. According to Doggett, the track makes allusions to other musical artists, from the Rolling Stones and Neil Young to the Beach Boys and Talking Heads; Bowie mimics the last's David Byrne in his vocal performance. In his book Bowie in Berlin (2008), author Thomas Jerome Seabrook compares "D.J." to Bowie's own "TVC 15" (1976) or "Be My Wife" (1977), in that it is a "seemingly straightforward, punch-drunk rock'n'roller that [is] then gleefully perverted [in] some way or the other". Bryan Wawzenek of Ultimate Classic Rock highlighted "D.J." as a "danceable gem".

== Release ==
"D.J." first appeared on Lodger on 25 May 1979, sequenced as the first track on side two of the original LP. RCA issued the song in slightly edited form as the second single from the album. In the UK, it was released on 29 June 1979, with album track "Repetition" as the B-side; in the US, it was released on 2 July, backed by "Fantastic Voyage". Initially available only on limited-edition green vinyl, the single charted at number 29 on the UK Singles Chart, number 98 on the Australian Top 100 and number 106 on the US Billboard Bubbling Under the Hot 100 chart. Several biographers agreed that it was an odd choice for a single, with Pegg describing it as "boldly uncommercial".

Its accompanying music video was directed by David Mallet. It features Bowie casually walking down London's Earl's Court Road as passersby recognise him and follow him. The sequences were unrehearsed and unannounced so the passersby's reactions were genuine; Bowie is kissed by both men and women. (Note: O'Leary comments that following the murder of John Lennon, Bowie never let himself be "so openly exposed" out in public again.) These scenes—what Pegg calls "naturalistic reflections on celebrity"—are interjected with Bowie as the tortured DJ destroying his studio; in a re-enactment of the closing scene of David Lean's Great Expectations (1946), the artist tears down the curtains to let the light in.

Bowie only performed "D.J." live during his 1995 Outside Tour. In November 2005, the song was featured in a television commercial titled Lost for the American XM Satellite Radio station, which boasted an ensemble cast including rapper Snoop Dogg, comedian Ellen DeGeneres, country singer Martina McBride, baseball player Derek Jeter and Bowie himself. Four years later, an unlicensed remix by club producer Benny Benassi was cleared by Bowie's estate and released as a digital download through Positiva Records.

== Reception ==
On release, "D.J." was deemed one of the album's best tracks by several reviewers. Retrospective reviews have been positive. Writing for The Rolling Stone Album Guide in 2004, Rob Sheffield commented on the "razor-sharp musical corners" and "new layers of wit and generosity in the songwriting" on Lodger, highlighting "Boys Keep Swinging", "D.J." and "Fantastic Voyage". In his review of the album, Stephen Thomas Erlewine of AllMusic wrote that "D.J.", along with "Look Back in Anger" and "Boys Keep Swinging", contain "strong melodic hooks that are subverted and strengthened by the layered, dissonant productions". The same publication's Dave Thompson called "D.J." one of the album's highlights—"a remarkable performance on a number of layers"—and a "lost gem" in Bowie's catalogue.

In a 2015 list compiling Bowie's best songs by Mojo magazine, the song was voted number 76. One year later, Ultimate Classic Rock placed the single at number 16 in a list ranking every Bowie single from worst to best.

== Other releases ==
"D.J.", both in its single edit and full-length form, has appeared on several compilation albums, including Changestwobowie (1981), The Singles Collection (1993), The Best of David Bowie 1974/1979 (1998), Best of Bowie (US/Canada 2002), and The Platinum Collection (2006). The song, along with the rest of its parent album, was remastered in 2017 for Parlophone's A New Career in a New Town (1977–1982) box set, which also featured a new remix by Visconti. The new mix brings the rhythm section more up to the forefront. In PopMatters, Chris Gerard gave the most acclaim to "D.J.", writing that its new mix gives the track "more punch and clarity". O'Leary calls it one of the best remixed tracks.

== Personnel ==
According to Chris O'Leary:

- David Bowie – lead and backing vocal, Chamberlin, piano
- Adrian Belew – lead guitar
- Carlos Alomar – rhythm guitar
- George Murray – bass guitar
- Dennis Davis – drums
- Simon House – violin

Production

- David Bowie – production
- Tony Visconti – production, engineer

== Charts ==
Chart performance for "D.J."
Chart (1979)	Peak position
Australian Top 100 (Kent Music Report)	98
UK Singles Chart	29
US Billboard Bubbling Under the Hot 100	106
