= M.O.R. =

1997 single by Blur

Single by Blur

from the album Blur
- B-side: "Swallows in the Heatwave"; "Movin' On" (remix); "Beetlebum" (remix)
- Released: 15 September 1997
- Genre: Alternative rock
- Length: 3:27 (album version)
- Label: Food; Parlophone
- Songwriters: Damon Albarn; Graham Coxon; Alex James; Dave Rowntree; David Bowie; Brian Eno
- Producer: Stephen Street

Blur singles chronology
"On Your Own" (1997)	"M.O.R." (1997)	"Tender" (1999)

Music video
- "M.O.R." on YouTube

"M.O.R." is a song by English rock band Blur from their eponymous album. Released on 15 September 1997, "M.O.R." reached number 15 in the UK Singles Chart on its release as a single in September 1997. Worldwide, it reached number 45 in New Zealand and also charted in Australia, Canada, and the United States.

== Composition and lyrics ==
The song's chord progression was borrowed from David Bowie's "Boys Keep Swinging" and "Fantastic Voyage". On the album Lodger Bowie and collaborator Brian Eno carried out a musical experiment in which multiple songs were written with the same chord progression, of which "Boys Keep Swinging" and "Fantastic Voyage" were the two that surfaced. "M.O.R." is both a continuation of, and tribute to that experiment, as its chorus also lifts the melody and call-and-response vocals from "Boys Keep Swinging" (Bowie and Eno both received credit for "M.O.R." after legal intervention). "M.O.R." itself stands for "middle of the road", which appears in the lyrics.

== Reception ==
Steven Wells made it the NME single of the week.

== Music video ==
The song's music video was directed by John Hardwick. It was shot in Sydney, Australia, and follows the misadventures of the band members (or rather, stuntmen in balaclavas pretending to be them) as they try to escape from the police. It was intended that the stuntmen wear masks of the band members to make it appear that the band were performing their own stunts, but the masks created for the video were such poor representations that the decision was made to use balaclavas instead. The video also features cameos by stunt choreographer Grant Page as a helicopter pilot, and actor Noah Taylor as a truck passenger. It is included in the Blur: The Best of DVD/VHS released on 30 October 2000. The 'actors' in the video are all anagrams of the member of the band they play. They are as follows:

- Dan Abnormal – Damon Albarn
- Trevor Dewane – Dave Rowntree
- Morgan C. Hoax – Graham Coxon
- Lee Jaxsam – Alex James

"Dan Abnormal" was an alias also used by Albarn whilst playing keyboards on the first Elastica album, as well as the title of a track on The Great Escape.

== Track listings ==
All lyrics were written by Albarn. All music was composed by Albarn, Coxon, James, and Rowntree.

UK and European CD single

1. "M.O.R." (road version)
2. "Swallows in the Heatwave"
3. "Movin' On" (William Orbit remix)
4. "Beetlebum" (Moby's minimal house remix)

UK cassette and limited-edition orange 7-inch single

1. "M.O.R." (road version)
2. "Swallows in the Heatwave"

German limited-edition live CD single

1. "M.O.R." (live at Peel Acres) – 2:59
2. "Beetlebum" (Viva Niteclub live acoustic) – 4:32
3. "On Your Own" (Viva Niteclub live acoustic) – 4:10
4. "Country Sad Ballad Man" (Viva Niteclub live acoustic) – 4:34
5. "This is a Low" (Viva Niteclub live acoustic) – 3:29

US CD single

1. "M.O.R." (road version) – 3:12
2. "Popscene" (live at Peel Acres) – 2:58
3. "Song 2" (live at Peel Acres) – 1:53
4. "Bustin' + Dronin'" – 6:30

Australian CD single

1. "M.O.R." (road version)
2. "Dancehall"
3. "Country Sad Ballad Man" (live acoustic version)
4. "Popscene" (live at Peel Acres)
5. "On Your Own" (live acoustic version)

Japanese CD single

1. "M.O.R." (road version)
2. "M.O.R." (karaoke version)
3. "I Love Her" (demo version)
4. "Death of a Party" (live at MC Vredenburg, Holland, 24 April 1997)

== Personnel and credits ==
- "Bustin' + Dronin'" and "Swallows in the Heatwave" produced by Blur
- "M.O.R." (road version) and "Dancehall" produced by Stephen Street
- Damon Albarn – guitar, vocals
- Graham Coxon – guitar, vocals
- Alex James – bass guitar
- Dave Rowntree – drums

== Charts ==
Chart (1997)	Peak position
Australia (ARIA)	68
Canada Rock/Alternative (RPM)	11
New Zealand (Recorded Music NZ)	45
Scottish Singles Sales (Official Charts)	15
UK Singles (Official Charts)	15
US Bubbling Under Hot 100 (Billboard)	14

== Release history ==
Region	Date	Format(s)	Label(s)	Ref.
United States	28 July 1997	Alternative radio	Virgin	
United Kingdom	15 September 1997	7-inch vinyl; CD; cassette	Food; Parlophone	
Japan	11 February 1998	CD	EMI; Food; Parlophone	
