= Christmas in the American Civil War =

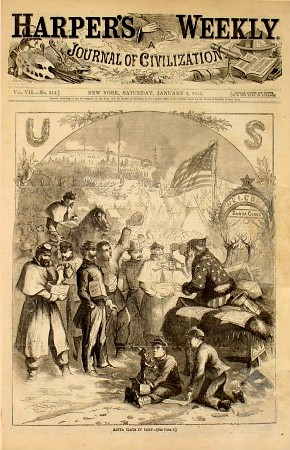
Santa Claus distributes gifts to Union troops in Nast's first Santa Claus cartoon, (1863)

The process of Christmas becoming a national holiday in the U.S. began when Representative Burton Chauncey Cook of Illinois introduced a bill in the U.S. Congress after the U.S. Civil War (1861–1865). It passed in both houses of Congress, and President Ulysses S. Grant signed it on June 28, 1870. During the Civil War, Christmas was celebrated in the Confederate States of America (the South). However, people doing non-religious celebrations were frowned upon and actually fined in Massachusetts. It was also seen as an unnecessary expense. It was thought to be a day of prayer and fasting by the Puritans and Lutherans. The day did not become an official holiday until five years after the war ended. The war continued to rage on Christmas, and skirmishes occurred throughout the countryside. Celebrations for both troops and civilians saw significant alteration. Propagandists, such as Thomas Nast, used wartime Christmases to reflect their beliefs during the war.

== War activities ==
On the first Christmas Day during the war, Lincoln hosted a Christmas party during the evening; earlier that day, he spent many hours explaining the capture of Confederate representatives to Great Britain and France, John Slidell and James Murray Mason (the Trent Affair).

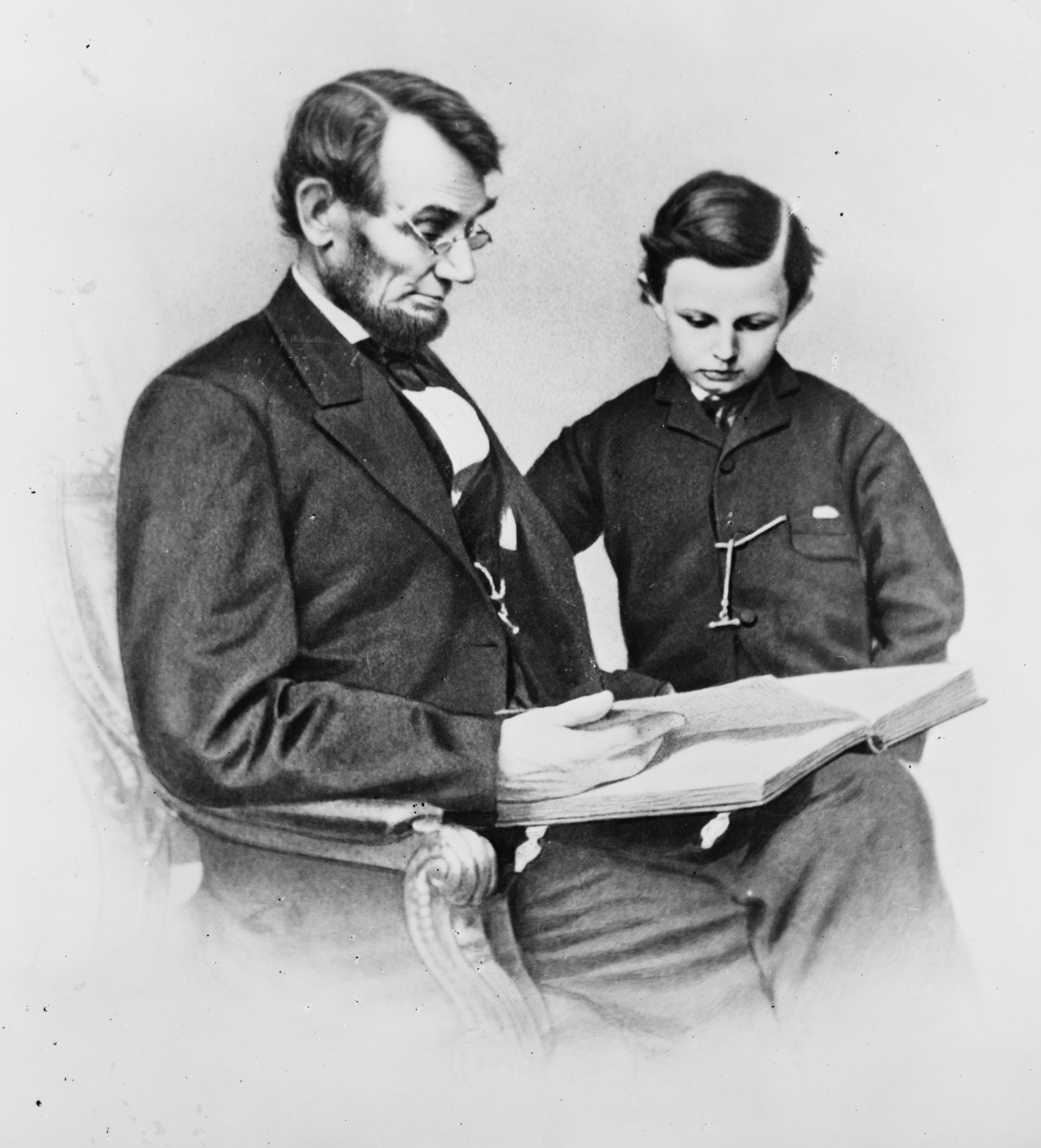
U.S. President Abraham Lincoln and his son Thomas "Tad" Lincoln

In 1862, the Lincolns visited injured soldiers at the various hospitals. Many Union soldiers in 1863 received gifts "From Tad Lincoln", as Tad had been deeply moved by the plight of Union soldiers when he was taken by his father to see them. The gifts were mostly books and clothing. The most famous Christmas gift Lincoln ever received came on December 22, 1864, when William Tecumseh Sherman announced the capture of Savannah, Georgia.

Military exercises also took place on December 25. In 1861, a blockade runner was caught by the Union navy, and there were two skirmishes in Virginia and Maryland. In 1862, there were several skirmishes, and Confederate general John Hunt Morgan engaged in his famous Christmas Raid in Kentucky. On that day, Morgan's men destroyed everything they could of the improvements that the Louisville & Nashville Railroad had made along 35 miles of track from Bacon Creek to Lebanon Junction. There was also a military execution for desertion that the soldiers were forced to witness. In 1863, Union forces destroyed Confederate salt works at Bear Inlet, North Carolina and, in South Carolina, there were skirmishes between the Union navy and Confederate artillery on the Stono River and near Charleston. In 1864, the Confederates fiercely repelled the Federal assault of sixty warships on Fort Fisher and several skirmishes were fought in the western theater of the war.

== Celebrating ==
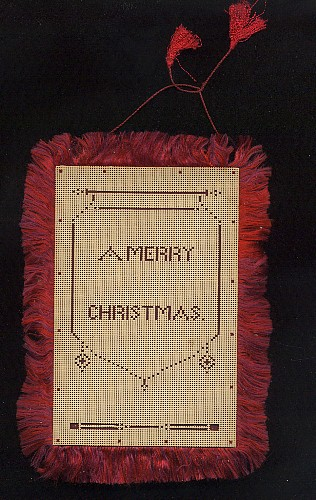
A silk Christmas card, ca. 1860

Soldiers not actively campaigning celebrated Christmas in several ways. Union soldiers would use salt pork and hardtack to decorate Christmas trees. Others were treated to special meals; a captain from Massachusetts treated his soldiers to foods such as turkey, oysters, pies, and apples. However, many soldiers received no special treats or privileges. In one incident on December 25, 1864, 90 Union soldiers from Michigan, led by their captain, dispensed "food and supplies" to poor Georgians, with the mules pulling the carts decorated to resemble reindeer by having tree branches tied to their heads. In some units, celebrating Christmas was not allowed. On December 25, 1862, soldiers of one unit were punished for celebratory gunfire for the holiday, when actually the gunfire was for a funeral salute.

Carols, hymns, and seasonal songs were sung during the period, with some, such as "Deck the Halls", "Oh Come All Ye Faithful", and Mendelssohn's "Hark, the Herald Angels Sing" (1840), still sung today. American musical contributions to the season include "It Came Upon the Midnight Clear" (1850), "Jingle Bells" (1857), "We Three Kings of Orient Are" (1857) and "Up on the Housetop" (1860). Although popular in Europe at the time, Christmas cards were scarce in the United States, and would not enjoy widespread use until the 1870s.

Henry Wadsworth Longfellow wrote his pacifist poem, "Christmas Bells" on Christmas Day 1864 at the news of his son Lieutenant Charles Appleton Longfellow having suffered severe wounds in November during the Mine Run Campaign. The poem was set to the tune "Waltham" by John Baptiste Calkin sometime after 1872 and has since been received into the established library of Christmas carols as "I Heard the Bells on Christmas Day". The carol version does not include two stanzas from the original poem that focused on the war.

For children, Christmas was altered during the war. Presents were fewer, especially in the devastated South. In We Were Marching on Christmas Day, author Kevin Rawlings notes that some southern children worried about the Union blockade, and one little girl, Sallie Brock Putnam, plotted the course Santa Claus would have to take to avoid it. Sometimes fathers on both sides were allowed furlough, and children were said to react to their fathers as if seeing "near strangers". Excuses for a lack of Santa included Yankees having shot him.

== Nast cartoons and other propaganda ==
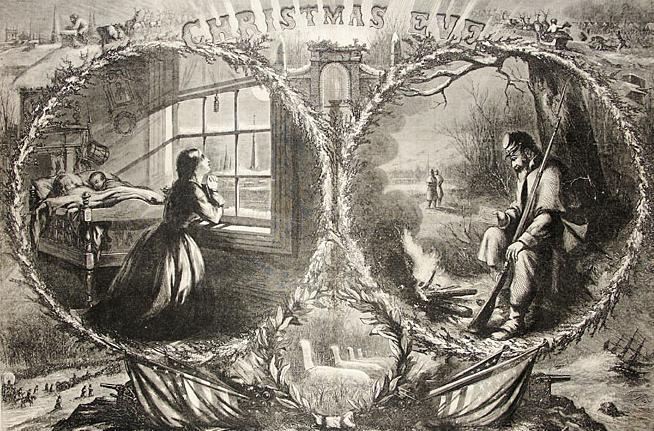
A husband and wife separated by the war (Nast, 1862)

Thomas Nast, who used his editorial cartoons to issue Union propaganda, made several illustrations reflecting the war.

The one for Christmas Eve 1862, which ran in the January 1863 issue of Harper's Weekly shows a wife on one side praying though a window in one circle, and in another circle shows her husband on the battlefield, also in prayer. The same issue's cover started how Santa Claus would be perceived by future Americans, as a white-bearded Santa hands such gifts as socks to Union soldiers, while also holding a Jefferson Davis dancing puppet with a rope tied around its neck to imply his execution. The Christmas 1863 issue showed the couple back together.

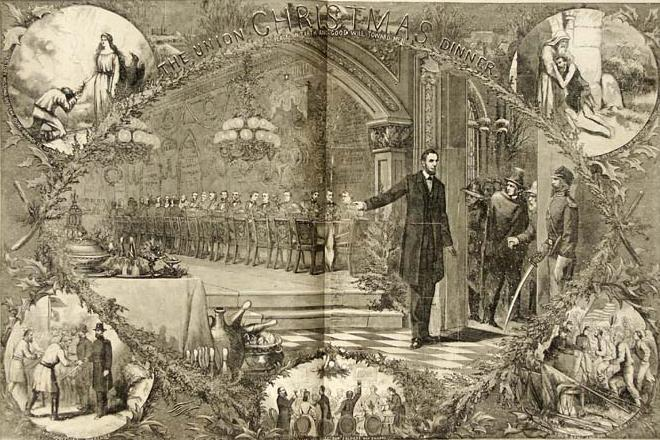
Lincoln welcomes Confederate soldiers (Nast, 1864)

The Nast Christmas cartoon for 1864 was a more conciliatory piece, showing Lincoln inviting Confederate soldiers into a warm lodge hall full of merriment. Lincoln called Nast's use of Santa Claus "the best recruiting sergeant the North ever had".

Nast was not the only one to use Christmas as a propaganda tool. On the Union side, The New York Herald also engaged in propaganda. One illustration published in the paper included Santa Claus fuming that he could not reach southern children, due to the northern blockade. On the Confederate side, The Richmond Examiner described Santa to its young readers as "a Dutch toy monger" who was a New York/New England "scrub" and Hottentot that had nothing to do with traditional Virginian celebrations of Christmas.

Even through the war was over, Nast had a drawing in the Christmas 1865 issue of Harper's Weekly depicting the heads of several Confederate generals at Ulysses S. Grant's feet in an image that centered on Santa. After the war Nast purposely made the North Pole the home of Saint Nick so that no one else could use him for nationalistic propaganda like Nast himself did.

== See also ==
- I Heard the Bells on Christmas Day
