= Lodger (album) =

1979 studio album by David Bowie

Studio album by David Bowie
- Released: 25 May 1979
- Recorded: September 1978, March 1979
- Studios: Mountain (Montreux, Switzerland); Record Plant (New York City)
- Genres: Art rock; experimental rock; avant-pop; world; new wave
- Length: 34:38
- Label: RCA Victor
- Producers: David Bowie; Tony Visconti

David Bowie chronology
Stage (1978)	Lodger (1979)	Scary Monsters (and Super Creeps) (1980)

Singles from Lodger
- 1. "Boys Keep Swinging" / "Fantastic Voyage" Released: 27 April 1979; 2. "D.J." / "Repetition" Released: 29 June 1979; 3. "Yassassin" / "Repetition" Released: July 1979 (Netherlands only); 4. "Look Back in Anger" / "Repetition" Released: 20 August 1979 (US and Canada only)

Lodger is the thirteenth studio album by the English musician David Bowie, released on 25 May 1979 through RCA Records. Recorded in collaboration with the musician Brian Eno and the producer Tony Visconti, it was the final release of his Berlin Trilogy, following Low and "Heroes" (both 1977). Sessions took place in Switzerland in September 1978 during a break in the Isolar II world tour, and in New York City in March 1979 at the tour's end. Most of the same personnel from prior releases returned, along with newcomer guitarist Adrian Belew. The sessions saw the use of techniques inspired by Eno's Oblique Strategies cards, such as having the musicians swap instruments and playing old songs backwards.

The music on Lodger is based in art rock and experimental rock. It lacks the electronic and ambient styles and the song/instrumental split of its two predecessors, favouring more conventional song structures and exploring styles such as avant-pop, world and new wave music. Lyrically, the album is divided into two major themes: travel (side one) and critiques of Western civilisation (side two). The pop artist Derek Boshier took the cover photo, portraying Bowie as an accident victim across the gatefold sleeve.

Lodger was a modest commercial success, peaking at number 4 in the UK and number 20 in the US. It produced four singles, including the UK top 10 hit "Boys Keep Swinging". Music videos directed by David Mallet accompanied three of the four singles. The album initially received mixed critical reviews, with many calling it the weakest of the Berlin Trilogy. Reception has grown in subsequent decades and it is now widely considered to be among Bowie's most underrated albums. Its world elements have been highlighted as particularly influential. Bowie and Visconti were dissatisfied with the album's original mix and, in 2015, Visconti remixed the album with Bowie's approval for inclusion on the 2017 box set A New Career in a New Town (1977–1982), along with a remaster of the original.

== Background ==
In the second half of 1976, David Bowie and his friend Iggy Pop relocated to the Château d'Hérouville in Hérouville, France, to escape from the drug culture of Los Angeles. There, Bowie produced Pop's debut studio album The Idiot (1977) and recorded his own, Low, in collaboration with the musician Brian Eno and the producer Tony Visconti. Low came to be known as the first in Bowie's Berlin Trilogy. After Low's release in January 1977, Bowie toured with Pop before co-producing his second solo album Lust for Life (1977), at Hansa Tonstudio in West Berlin.

Bowie's productivity continued throughout the rest of 1977. He recorded his second Berlin release with Visconti and Eno, "Heroes", released in October 1977, after which he conducted extensive promotion for the album. These included a collaboration with the singer Bing Crosby on Bing Crosby's Merrie Olde Christmas television special ("Peace on Earth/Little Drummer Boy"), and contributing narration for an adaptation of Sergei Prokofiev's classical composition Peter and the Wolf, released as an album in May 1978. He also starred in the David Hemmings film Just a Gigolo, and toured Low and "Heroes" on the Isolar II world tour from March 1978 to the end of the year.

== Recording and production ==
Recording for Lodger began during the four-month break in the Isolar II world tour during September 1978. Although Lodger is known as the final release of the Berlin Trilogy, it was largely recorded at Mountain Studios in Montreux, Switzerland, with additional recording to finish the album at the Record Plant in New York City. The atmosphere in Montreux was very different from that in Berlin; the studio was built on the site of a previous studio that had burned down. Whereas Hansa Tonstudio was located near the Berlin Wall, Mountain Studios was located in an Alpine retreat. Bowie's longtime guitarist Carlos Alomar described the location as "boring", preferring the "excitement" of Hansa. Additionally, the building acoustics in Mountain were regarded as inferior to Hansa.

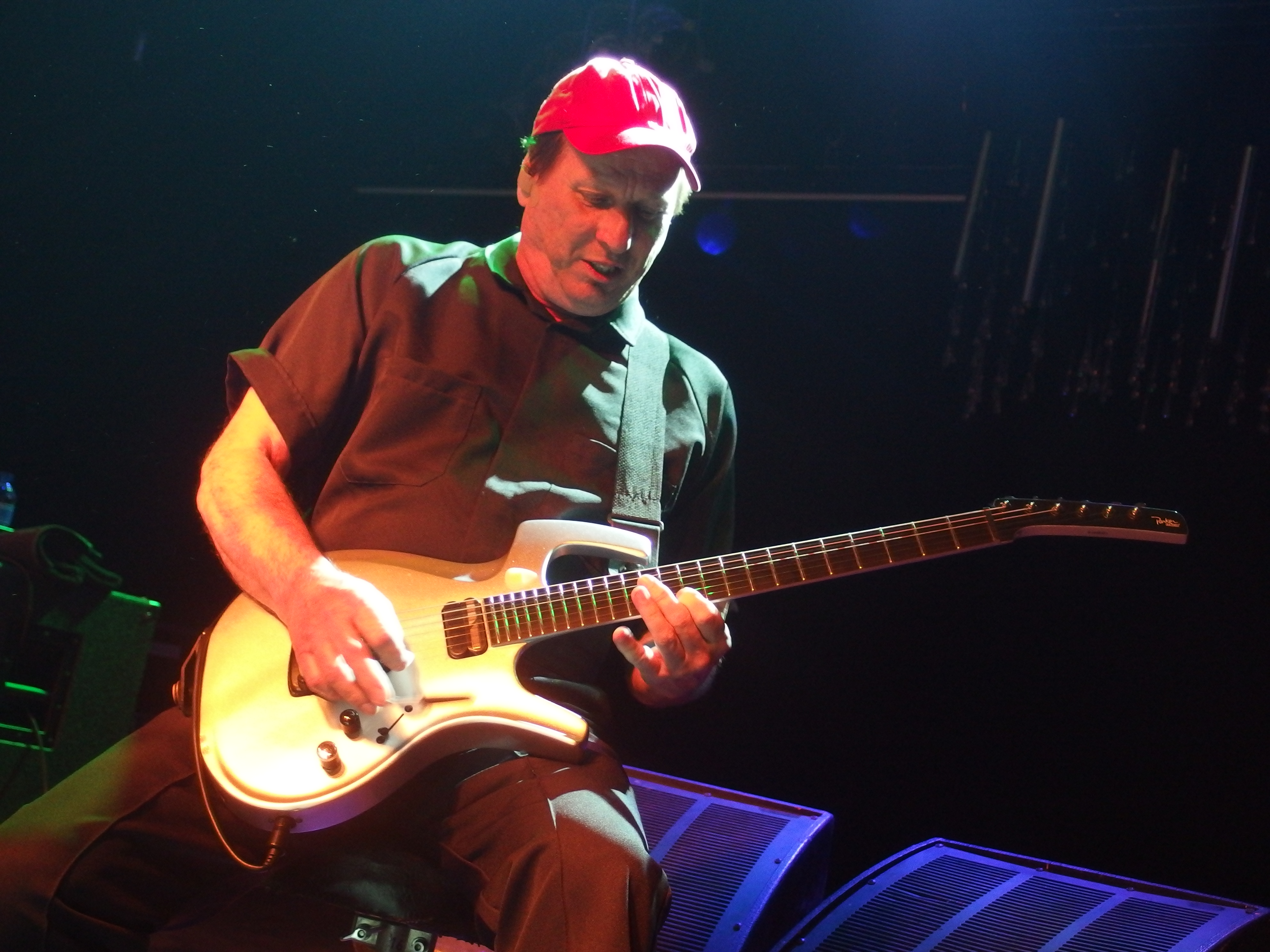
Lodger features contributions from guitarist Adrian Belew (pictured in 2017).

Many of the same personnel from Bowie's earlier records returned for the Lodger sessions, including Eno on synthesisers, Visconti as producer, Alomar, drummer Dennis Davis and bassist George Murray.. A new addition was guitarist Adrian Belew, whom Bowie had "poached" while Belew was touring with Frank Zappa. (Note: Belew later joined King Crimson, whose de facto leader Robert Fripp played guitar on Bowie's album "Heroes".) Much of Belew's work on Lodger was composited from multiple takes played against backing tracks of which he had no prior knowledge, not even the key. Belew recalled, "When I arrived, they had about twenty tracks already done: bass, drums, rhythm guitar, but no vocals. They said, 'We're not going to let you hear these songs. We want you to go into the studio and play accidentally – whatever occurs to you'." Belew described the final guitar solo on "D.J." as sounding like "you're changing channel on the radio and each channel has a different guitar solo on it".

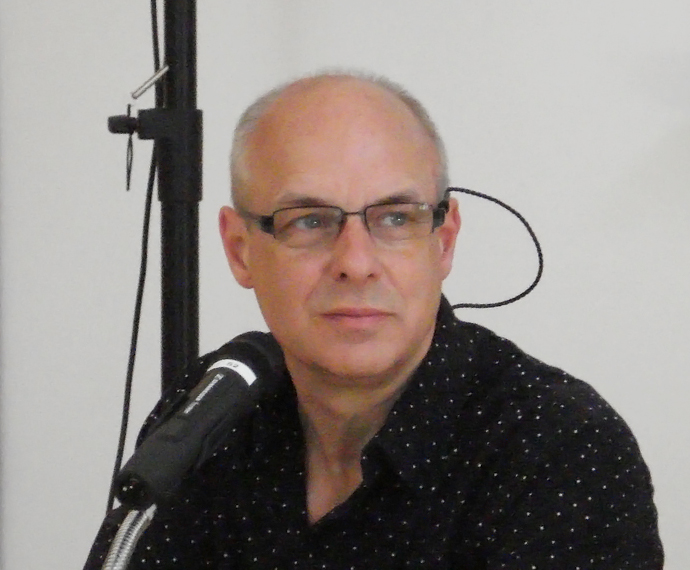
Lodger marked the third collaboration between Bowie and Brian Eno (pictured in 2008). Compared to "Heroes", the sessions saw greater use of Eno's Oblique Strategies cards, which were intended to spark creative ideas.

Bowie and Eno used techniques from Eno's Oblique Strategies cards. According to the biographer Chris O'Leary, these cards were "part-fortune cookie, part-Monopoly 'Chance' cards", intended to spark creative ideas. Eno and Bowie used them previously to create some of the instrumentals for "Heroes". Using the cards, Bowie and Eno conducted numerous experimental methods during the sessions. Some of these included using old tunes played backwards, employing identical chord sequences for different songs and having the musicians swap instruments, as Alomar and Davis did on "Boys Keep Swinging". The pianist Sean Mayes explained: "[Bowie] was very keen on spontaneity. He liked everything to be recorded in one or two takes, mistakes and all." The biographer Nicholas Pegg writes how several songs, including "African Night Flight", "Yassassin" and "Red Sails", were composed "around a melodic clash of disparate cultures". Due to the experimental nature of the sessions, initial working titles for the album included Planned Accidents and Despite Straight Lines. Unlike the lyrics for "Heroes", which Bowie largely improvised as he stood next to the microphone, he wrote most of Lodger's lyrics at a later date; they were unknown during the Mountain sessions. Other than "Yassassin" and "Red Sails", most of the tracks were recorded with working titles.

Alongside the use of Eno's Oblique Strategies cards, Visconti recalled Eno having more leeway during the sessions than those for Low and "Heroes". For "Look Back in Anger", Eno gave the backing band eight of his favourite chords and instructed them to "play something funky". Alomar disliked this, telling biographer David Buckley that he "totally, totally resisted it". Despite Eno assuming control at certain points, he appeared on, and co-wrote, only six of the album's ten tracks. Eno felt the trilogy had "petered out" by Lodger, and Belew also observed Eno's and Bowie's working relationship closing down: "They didn't quarrel or anything uncivilised like that; they just didn't seem to have the spark that I imagine they might have had during the "Heroes" album." Visconti shared similar sentiments, saying on multiple occasions: "I don't think [David's] heart was in Lodger." "We had fun, but nevertheless an ominous feeling pervaded the album for me."

The sessions at Mountain Studios lasted three weeks, after which the band went back on tour. At the tour's conclusion, Bowie reconvened at the Record Plant in March 1979, where he recorded his lyrics and instrumental overdubs, and began mixing. Belew returned to record further guitar overdubs while Visconti recorded a replacement bass guitar part for "Boys Keep Swinging" after Bowie decided Davis' original was unsuitable. This work was completed in a week. Visconti recalled having "sonic problems" during the mixing stage because the studio did not have the technical advancements of European studios.

== Musical style ==
Before Lodger, the music was darker and probably less experimental. Lodger was more of a world record – urban and eastern at the same time. It seemed [Bowie] was spreading his wings in that direction, incorporating world music styles. It really inspired me to open up my guitar playing.

— Adrian Belew on the album's sound

Much like its two predecessors, Consequence of Sound described the music on Lodger as art rock and experimental rock. However, the album abandons the electronic and ambient styles and the song/instrumental split that defined the two earlier works, in favour of more conventional song structures. Visconti explained: "We dropped the ambient-side-two concept and just recorded songs!" As such, Lodger is the most "accessible" record of the Berlin Trilogy; AllMusic's Stephen Thomas Erlewine described the songs as "twisted avant-pop", while Belew similarly characterised them as "avant-garde pop music". Its musical textures, particularly on "African Night Flight", have been cited as presaging the popularity of world music, Bowie himself considered the album a forerunner of the sounds developed by Eno and David Byrne for My Life in the Bush of Ghosts (1981). Frank Mastropolo of Ultimate Classic Rock wrote that Lodger combines world and new wave music into a "pop format". Although Bryan Wawzenek, also of Ultimate Classic Rock, found Lodger to be the more accessible record of the Berlin Trilogy, he also felt it to be the most experimental, observing elements of Middle Eastern music, reggae, world and krautrock within the vast array of pop songs. Biographers have singled out the final track on "Heroes", "The Secret Life of Arabia", in particular, as a precursor to what Bowie explored on Lodger, both musically and thematically.

After the ominousness of Low and "Heroes", biographers have described the opening track, "Fantastic Voyage", as "surprisingly delicate" and "serene"; a thought author Peter Doggett believes implies a "less intense" record. The song shares the same chord sequence as "Boys Keep Swinging" and features three different players playing mandolin parts; each part was triple-tracked to create a total of nine parts. Bowie composed "Move On" after accidentally playing his earlier composition "All the Young Dudes" backwards, then having Alomar write out the reversed chord sequence. "Yassassin" combines funk and reggae, using a violin played by Simon House to create a sound reminiscent of a Middle Eastern folk song and Turkish music. In part, the music of German band Neu! inspired "Red Sails", sharing their distinctive "motorik" drum beat; Pegg describes it as "an upbeat slab of new wave pop". The track has also been compared with Harmonia's 1975 track "Monza (Rauf und Runter)".

Bowie said that "D.J." was "somewhat cynical" and his "natural response to disco". Bowie mimics David Byrne of Talking Heads in his vocal performance. Wawzenek highlighted "D.J." as a "danceable gem". Doggett describes "Look Back in Anger" as "propulsive and impatient", while Ned Raggett of AllMusic called it a "sharp-edged, thrillingly modern rock song". O'Leary particularly highlights Davis' drumming as the standout, while Alomar's guitar solo was influenced by John Lennon's rhythm guitar work in the Beatles. The Quietus found "Boys Keep Swinging" to contain elements of glam rock and garage rock. For the recording, which has the same chord sequence as "Fantastic Voyage", Bowie instructed the band to swap instruments. "Repetition" features a bass guitar riff that is described by Buckley as "insistent and very odd". Doggett highlights its sound as similar to funk music. "Red Money" is built around the backing track of "Sister Midnight", an Iggy Pop song he recorded with Bowie for The Idiot. New guitar parts were added, along with electronic effects, backwards guitar and vocal harmonies.

== Lyrics and themes ==
Though missing the song/instrumental split that characterised Low and "Heroes", Lodger has been interpreted as covering two major themes— travel and critiques of Western civilisation on sides one and two, respectively. In early 1977, Bowie said, "I don't live anywhere, really. I travel 100% of the time," further noting, "The more I travel, the less sure I am about exactly which political philosophies are commendable. All my traveling is done on the basis of wanting to get my ideas for writing from real events rather than from going back to a system from whence it came." Because of this, Lodger is interpreted by some as a concept album. Some songs showcase heavily politicised lyrics, including "Fantastic Voyage", which deals with the "depression" brought on by Cold War leaders and the possibility of nuclear war, and "Repetition", which deals with domestic violence. James E. Perone finds a general theme of political oppression and insanity. Eno was unhappy with the direction Bowie took for the lyrics.

Regarding side one's theme of travel, Pegg writes that the songs revive a "perennial motif" prevailing throughout the Berlin Trilogy, highlighting the line, "I've lived all over the world, I've left every place" from the Low track "Be My Wife", pointing out the journey is both metaphorical and geographical. Between the Montreaux and New York sessions, Bowie traveled to Kenya with his son Duncan Jones, which inspired the lyrics for "African Night Flight". The same trip, along with ones to Japan and Australia, inspired "Move On", which reflects the theme of wanderlust throughout side one. Regarding the song titles, Doggett quips, "After his 'African Night Flight', what else to do but 'Move On'!" When asked about "Red Sails", Bowie said in 1979: "Here we took a new German music feel and put it against the idea of a contemporary English mercenary-cum-swashbuckling Errol Flynn, and put him in the China Sea. We have a lovely cross-reference of cultures. I honestly don't know what it's about." Pegg writes that "Red Sails" symbolises Bowie's venture away from the mainstream. "Yassassin" is Turkish for 'long live', from the word yaşasın. Like the instrumental "Heroes" track "Neuköln", the song is about the discrimination Turkish immigrants who lived in Berlin faced, although its lyrical approach is more direct.

The lyrics of side two primarily critique Western society. "D.J." takes a sardonic look at the world of the disc jockey. On the song, the DJ is looked at solely for what he is on the outside: "I am a DJ, I am what I play". Swiftly compared to Elvis Costello's "Radio Radio" (1978), writer Ian Mathers describes the song as "a horror story about a human being reduced to nothing more than work". "Look Back in Anger" sees Bowie encounter an angel of death who has come to claim his soul. "Boys Keep Swinging" contains gender-bending lyrics, particularly, "When you're a boy, other boys check you out." In 2000, Bowie said of the track: "The glory in that song was ironic. I do not feel that there is anything remotely glorious about being either male or female. I was merely playing on the idea of the colonisation of a gender." In "Repetition", the narrator conveys no emotion when beating his wife, leading Buckley to describe it as Bowie at "his most chilling". "Red Money" proclaims the message "project canceled". Regarding the "red boxes" that appear throughout, Bowie stated: "This song, I think, is about responsibility. Red boxes keep cropping up in my paintings and they represent responsibility."

== Artwork ==
Bowie collaborated on the cover design for Lodger with the English pop artist Derek Boshier, who later designed the artwork for Bowie's 15th studio album Let's Dance (1983). The original gatefold album sleeve featured a full-length shot by photographer Brian Duffy of Bowie in a tiled bathroom looking like an accident victim, heavily made up with an apparently broken nose and a bandaged hand. This was inspired by the self-portraits of Egon Schiele. To accomplish the shot, taken in February 1979 at Duffy's London studio, Bowie balanced himself on a steel frame while the photographer captured the image from above. The broken nose and facial morphing were accomplished using prosthetic make-up and nylon threads. Bowie's bandaged hand was genuine; according to Pegg, he had burned it with coffee that morning and decided to incorporate the hand into the photo. At Bowie's request, the image was taken in a low resolution with a Polaroid SX-70 type camera; outtakes from the photoshoot have appeared in the 2014 book Duffy/Bowie – Five Sessions. The front features a postcard with the album title in four different languages, enhancing its theme of travel. Inside the gatefold are pictures of Che Guevara's corpse, Andrea Mantegna's painting Lamentation of Christ and Bowie being readied for the cover photo. Rykodisc did not reproduce these images on their 1991 CD reissue.

== Release and promotion ==
RCA Records released the lead single from Lodger, "Boys Keep Swinging", with "Fantastic Voyage" as the B-side, on 27 April 1979. To promote the song, Bowie had appeared on The Kenny Everett Video Show four days earlier. According to Pegg, he dressed in a "1950s Mod-style suit" that made him look like a "fresh-faced schoolboy". David Mallet, who Bowie chose to direct a promo video for "Boys Keep Swinging", directed the programme. The promo and his Everett performance were filmed back-to-back, although the former featured extra backup dancers who turned out to be Bowie in drag. The Everett performance, along with an appearance as the guest DJ on Radio 1's Star Special, helped "Boys Keep Swinging" reach number seven on the UK Singles Chart, Bowie's highest-charting single since "Sound and Vision". However, due to the song's gender-bending video and lyrics, RCA refused to release the single in the US.

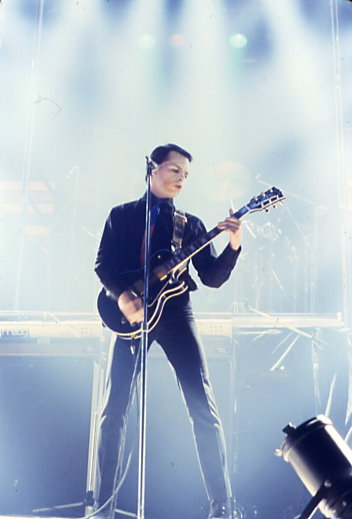
Lodger was released at a time when artists that were influenced by Bowie's other Berlin releases, such as Gary Numan (pictured in 1980), were starting to gain popularity. Numan himself was criticised by contemporaries and Bowie himself as a copycat of Bowie.

RCA issued Lodger on 25 May 1979, (Note: The release date was previously thought to be 18 May 1979. Bowie's official website unveiled new evidence in 2020 finding the actual release date to be 25 May.) with the catalogue number RCA BOW LP 1. Its release came almost two years after "Heroes", marking the longest gap between Bowie studio albums since his second self-titled album (1969). Buckley writes that within that time, new wave had begun to emerge and overtake punk rock as the dominant genre, highlighting the likes of Blondie and Kate Bush. He also notes that music videos and artists who were influenced by the music on Low and "Heroes", such as the Human League, Devo and Gary Numan, had begun to gain popularity.

Lodger performed well commercially, peaking at number four on the UK Albums Chart and remaining on the chart for 17 weeks. It peaked at number 20 on the US Billboard Top LPs & Tape chart, remaining on the chart for 15 weeks. Throughout the year, Bowie was out-performed commercially by Numan, who had number one hits with Tubeway Army's "Are "Friends" Electric?", his debut solo album The Pleasure Principle, and its lead single "Cars". Numan, a huge fan of Bowie's, was antagonised by Bowie's fans who viewed him as a mere copycat. Bowie himself criticised Numan, which led to a feud between the two artists that lasted for years. According to Buckley, Numan's fame indirectly led to Bowie taking a more pop-oriented direction for his next studio album, Scary Monsters (and Super Creeps) (1980).

"D.J." was chosen as the second single, with "Repetition" as the B-side, released on 29 June 1979, Pegg calls it a "boldly uncommercial choice" for a single. Appearing in edited form, the single stalled on the charts, peaking at number 29 in the UK. It was supported by a music video, also directed by Mallet. The video features Bowie walking down a road in London's Earl's Court, attracting surprised fans, interspersed with shots of him as an abused DJ. "Yassassin" was released as the album's third single in the Netherlands, backed again by "Repetition", in July 1979. It failed to chart, but the Dutch single edit was later included on Re:Call 3, as part of the A New Career in a New Town (1977–1982) box set (2017). "Look Back in Anger", with "Repetition" once again as the B-side, was released as the album's fourth single in the US and Canada only, where it failed to chart. A music video, again directed by Mallet, promoted it. The video, inspired by Oscar Wilde's The Picture of Dorian Gray (1891), depicts Bowie as a painter in an attic studio whose self-portrait begins to decay and melt.

== Critical reception ==
Professional ratings
Review scores
Source	Rating
Record Mirror	5/5 stars
Smash Hits	6/10
Sounds	4/5 stars
The Village Voice	A−

In contrast to the universal praise received by its predecessor two years before, Lodger received mixed reviews from music critics on its original release. Among the negative reviews, Greil Marcus of Rolling Stone called the album "one of [Bowie's] weakest ... scattered, a footnote to "Heroes", an act of marking time", while Jon Savage of Melody Maker found it boring and "a nice enough pop record, beautifully played, produced and crafted, and slightly faceless". In Smash Hits, Red Starr described the album as sounding like "a ragbag of rejects from previous styles" with "only occasional flashes of genius". A reviewer for Billboard similarly noted "the tone of the album is less foreboding than his more recent musical excursions". Although they considered this was both a "continuation" and a "departure" from his previous works, the magazine chose Lodger among their Top Album Picks the week of 9 June 1979. Paul Yamada of New York Rocker felt the album was a letdown compared to its two predecessors. Although he found some of the songs "good" and complimented its "easy-listening" nature, he noted the absence of the more "challenging" work on the earlier releases and found Lodger as a whole to be "a frustrating but well-crafted LP that is much less than it appears to be". Sandy Robertson of Sounds felt Lodger has "some ideas successfully realised", but as a whole is "not brilliant". The Chicago Tribune's Lynn Van Matre did not find it one of Bowie's best.

The album did receive some positive reviews. Ken Emerson in The New York Times called it Bowie's "most eloquent" record in years, while Robert Christgau of The Village Voice wrote favourably, stating that although the songs may seem impassive and not designful, he believed those qualities are "part of their charm—the way they confound categories of sensibility and sophistication is so frustrating it's satisfying". Tim Lott of Record Mirror wrote: "It's simply appealing in such an unusual way that a clear definition is impossible, even when plotted against its own predecessors rather than 'pop music' in general." He commended the variety of musical styles present but criticised some of the lyrics as lazy. William Carlton of the New York Daily News hailed it "Bowie at his best", praising the performances of Bowie and the band, and the various musical styles. A reviewer for the Chicago Sun-Times found Lodger "uneven" but ultimately "more interesting and entertaining" than its predecessors. In The Village Voice's annual Pazz & Jop critics poll for the year's best albums, Lodger finished at number 31. In NME's list, it placed at number 40.

== Influence and legacy ==
The consensus among critics at the time of its release was that Lodger was the weakest of the Berlin Trilogy. The biographer Paul Trynka states that Lodger lacked the "sense of risk and excitement" that had "pervaded" its two predecessors, which he partly attributed to the studio it was recorded at. However, soon after its release, NME editors Roy Carr and Charles Shaar Murray predicted that Lodger would "have to 'grow in potency' over a few years, but eventually, it will be accepted as one of Bowie's most complex and rewarding projects". Indeed, Lodger has come to be considered as one of Bowie's most underrated works. Wawzenek described it as Bowie's Return of the Jedi (1983) rather than his The Godfather Part III (1990). While the biographer Christopher Sandford calls Lodger a "slick, calculatedly disposable record", Buckley contends that "its stature grows with each passing year", and Pegg sums up, "undervalued and obscure practically from the moment of its release, its critical re-evaluation is long overdue".

Discussing the Berlin Trilogy as a whole, Seabrook finds that then and now, listeners come to Lodger expecting a "resolution" to the sounds and themes of its two predecessors, but do not get that. He further contends that it lacks the "pioneer spirit" of Low and the "sheer gravitas" of "Heroes". Nevertheless, he considers some tracks, including "African Night Flight", "Repetition" and "Red Money", among his best work of the period. Perone argues that Lodger is "by far" Bowie's "most lyrically and musically challenging" album of his late 1970s and early 1980s output, further illustrating the influence of contemporaries on Bowie. Trynka states that over the years, the album has attracted "admiration" rather than "visceral love or hatred", and its sound is viewed as a forerunner to the sound of Talking Heads and Spandau Ballet. Lodger is one of Bowie's most influential works according to Encyclopædia Britannica. The biographer Marc Spitz agrees, citing its use of world music as influential on Talking Heads' Remain in Light (1980) and Paul Simon's Graceland (1986). Spitz describes the album's promotional videos directed by Mallet "as innovative as anything Bowie had ever done before".

=== Retrospective appraisal ===
Professional ratings
Review scores
Source	Rating
AllMusic	4.5/5 stars
Blender	4/5 stars
Chicago Tribune	2.5/4 stars
The Encyclopedia of Popular Music	2/5 stars
Entertainment Weekly	B+
Pitchfork	8.5/10
Q	4/5 stars
The Rolling Stone Album Guide	5/5 stars
Spin	4/5 stars
Spin Alternative Record Guide	8/10

Retrospectively, Lodger has received more positive reviews. Upon the album's 1991 reissue, Ira Robbins compared its accessibility to its predecessors and felt the songs were forerunners of Let's Dance in Entertainment Weekly. Writing for The Rolling Stone Album Guide in 2004, Rob Sheffield praised Lodger, stating it "rocks just as hard as Station to Station and Aladdin Sane". He also commented on the "razor-sharp musical corners" and "new layers of wit and generosity in the songwriting", highlighting "Boys Keep Swinging", "D.J." and "Fantastic Voyage". Jon Dolan of Spin magazine considered Lodger to be a great end to "[Bowie's] best decade", calling it "his last great album".

In 2008, Chris Roberts of Uncut magazine felt that Lodger never received the appreciation it deserved, writing: "Generally perceived as the afterthought of the legendary "Berlin trilogy" ... Lodger deserves a room of its own in the critical pantheon." Ian MacDonald agreed, writing that it was always thought of as the "anticlimax" of the trilogy, but stating that "if it doesn't add up as a single listening experience, its parts are rarely without quality." Erlewine also gave the album a positive review, writing: "It might not stretch the boundaries of rock like Low and "Heroes", but it arguably utilises those ideas [more effectively]." Mike Powell of Pitchfork described Lodger as "the first David Bowie album marketed as nothing more than an album of recorded music by David Bowie". He commented on the record's accessibility compared to Bowie's earlier releases. Although he felt Lodger might always be remembered as the least "essential" effort of the Berlin Trilogy, Wawzenek concludes: "as a postcard from one of Bowie's most exciting phases, it's a fascinating glimpse of the artist in the midst of a bold transition".

Electronica/techno artist Moby later said he got his first job as a golf caddy so that he could afford to buy Lodger, which had just come out at the time. American indie rock band Built to Spill referenced the album in their song "Distopian Dream Girl" taken from their 1994 album There's Nothing Wrong with Love. A few of Lodger's songs influenced two English Britpop bands in the 1990s. Blur used the same chord sequence as "Fantastic Voyage" and "Boys Keep Swinging" in their 1997 single "M.O.R.". The song's chorus also borrows the melody and call-and-response vocals from "Boys Keep Swinging"; Bowie and Eno both received credit for "M.O.R." after legal intervention. The lead singer Damon Albarn has cited Bowie as an influence. Oasis named their 1996 single "Don't Look Back in Anger", written by Noel Gallagher, after "Look Back in Anger". American indie rock band Shearwater covered the album in its entirety at live shows and on The A.V. Club following Bowie's death in early 2016.

In the 1990s, American composer Philip Glass adapted Low and "Heroes" into classical music symphonies, titled "Low" Symphony and "Heroes" Symphony, respectively. Glass informed Bowie of the projects and the two stayed in touch with each other until 2003; the two discussed making a third symphony which never came to fruition. After Bowie's death, Glass said the two had talked about adapting Lodger for the third symphony, adding that "the idea has not totally disappeared". In January 2018, Glass announced the completion of a symphony based on Lodger. The work is Glass' 12th Symphony; it premiered in Los Angeles in January 2019. Like Glass's other adaptations, the "Lodger" Symphony is separated into seven movements, each named after tracks on Lodger. The symphony marked the completion of his trilogy of works based on Bowie's Berlin Trilogy.

=== 2017 remix ===
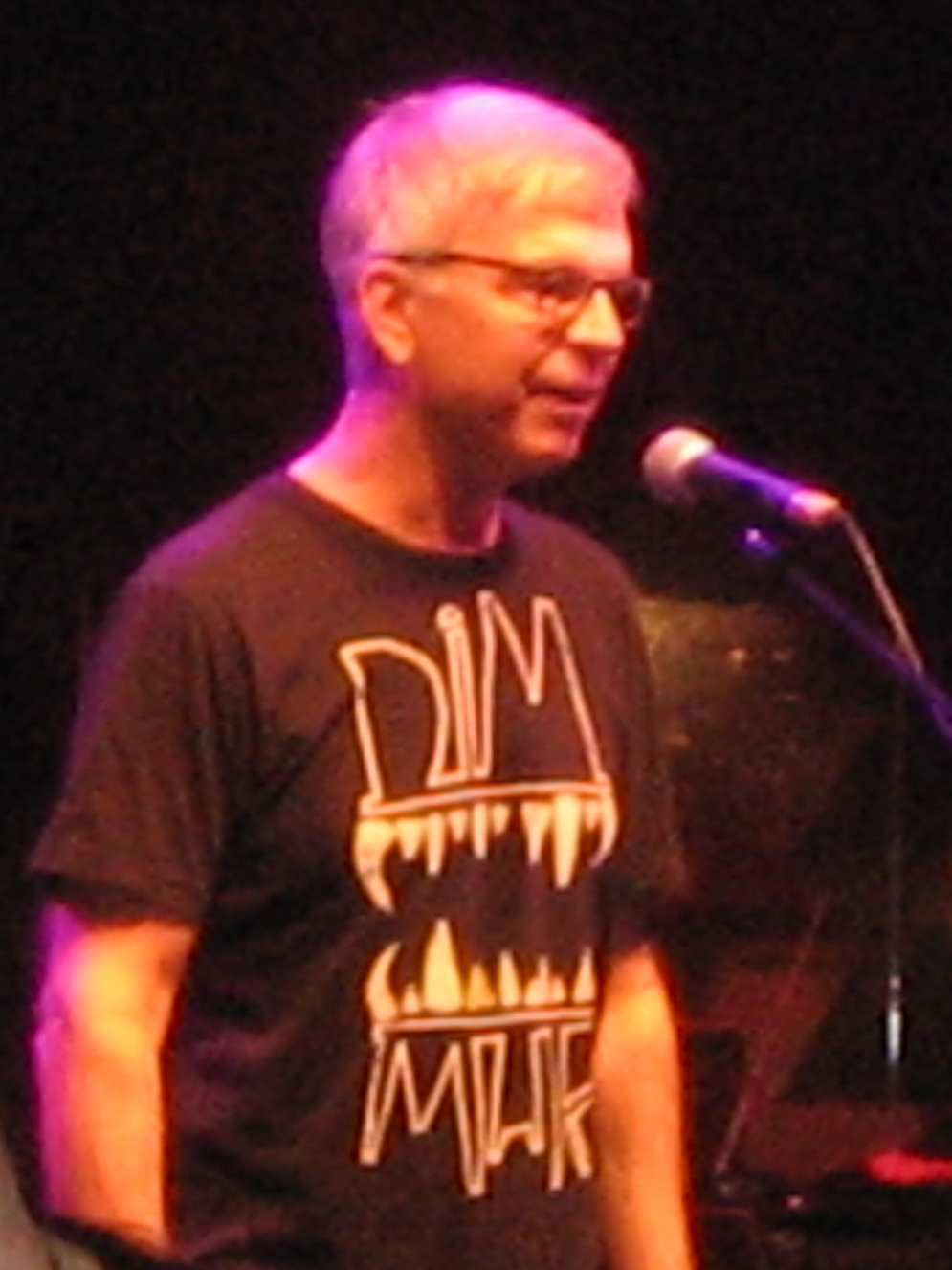
Lodger was remixed in 2017 by co-producer Tony Visconti (pictured in 2007), who was unsatisfied with the original mix.

Reviewers criticised Lodger's original mix for many years, calling it "over-cluttered" and "over-produced". Regarding the mix, Visconti stated: "My only regret is that we went to New York to finish [the] album and it suffered at the mixing stage because New York studios simply were not as versatile or well-equipped as their European counterparts in those days." Bowie also expressed disappointment in the mix, citing distractions in his personal life at the time and the overall feeling he and Visconti had that the record did not come together as easily as its two predecessors. Bowie and Visconti began discussing the possibility of remixing Lodger during the sessions for Bowie's 24th studio album The Next Day (2013) for a possible deluxe edition reissue, with the latter explaining: "[It's] an important record to both of us. David agrees it never sounded the way we wanted."

During the sessions for Bowie's final album Blackstar in 2015, Visconti secretly began remixing Lodger. He presented the new mixes to Bowie, who approved of them before his death. Visconti finished the remix in late 2016 and included it on A New Career in a New Town. Erlewine praised the remix as "dense and colorful without changing the feel of the original", helping to "focus attention on an excellent record that often gets overshadowed by the three albums accompanying it in this box." Rolling Stone's Kory Grow wrote that the new mix "loosens" the album's sound, saying there is "a greater emphasis on orchestral strings" and the percussion "sometimes comes out of different speakers". Grow further noted that the mix makes "everything [feel] generally lighter", notably on "Red Money" and "Yassassin". Overall, Grow gave praise to the new mix, calling it a "brilliant new take" and noting that the original now feels "muddier" by comparison. Chris Gerard of PopMatters also praised the remix, believing it "drastically improved" the record and is "nothing short of revelatory". Gerard gave the most acclaim to "D.J.", writing that its new mix gives the track "more punch and clarity". Ultimately, Gerard felt the new mix is the highlight of the box set and gives Lodger enough recognition to be labeled as among Bowie's finest works.

=== Reissues ===
Lodger has been reissued several times. Although the original 1979 vinyl release featured a gatefold cover, some later LP versions such as RCA's 1981 US reissue presented the album in a standard non-gatefold sleeve. The album was first released on CD by RCA in the mid-1980s. Rykodisc and EMI reissued the album with two bonus tracks in 1991, including the outtake "I Pray, Olé" and a new version of "Look Back in Anger". Another reissue, without bonus tracks, was released by Virgin Records and EMI in 1999, featuring 24-bit digitally remastered sound. In 2017, the A New Career in a New Town (1977–1982) box set released by Parlophone included two versions of Lodger: a remaster of the standard album and a new remix by Visconti. The 2017 remaster was separately released, in CD, vinyl, and digital formats, the following year.

== Track listing ==
All lyrics are written by David Bowie.

Side one
No.	Title	Music	Length
1.	"Fantastic Voyage"	Bowie, Brian Eno	2:55
2.	"African Night Flight"	Bowie, Eno	2:54
3.	"Move On"	Bowie	3:16
4.	"Yassassin" (Turkish: Yaşasın, lit. 'Long Live')	Bowie	4:10
5.	"Red Sails"	Bowie, Eno	3:43

Side two
No.	Title	Music	Length
1.	"D.J."	Bowie, Eno, Carlos Alomar	3:59
2.	"Look Back in Anger"	Bowie, Eno	3:08
3.	"Boys Keep Swinging"	Bowie, Eno	3:17
4.	"Repetition"	Bowie	2:59
5.	"Red Money"	Bowie, Alomar	4:17
Total length:			34:38

== Personnel ==
Credits are adapted from the album's liner notes. The track numbers refer to CD and digital releases of the album.

- David Bowie – lead and background vocals; synthesiser (4); piano (1, 6); Chamberlin (6); guitar (8, 10)
- Brian Eno – ambient drone (1); prepared piano and cricket menace (2); guitar treatments (5); synthesisers (5, 7); horse trumpet and eroica horn (7); piano (8); backing vocals (4)
- Tony Visconti – mandolin (1); guitar (3–4); bass guitar (8); backing vocals (1, 3–4, 7–8, 10)
- Adrian Belew – mandolin (1); guitar (3, 5–6, 8–10)
- Carlos Alomar – guitar (2–7, 9–10); drums (8); backing vocals (4)
- Dennis Davis – drums (1, 4–6, 9–10); percussion (2–3, 7); bass guitar (8); backing vocals (4)
- George Murray – bass guitar (all but track 8); backing vocals (4)
- Sean Mayes – piano (1–3, 5, 7)
- Simon House – mandolin (1); violin (4–5, 8–9); backing vocals (4)
- Roger Powell – synthesisers (9–10)
- Stan Harrison – saxophone (5)

Production

- David Bowie – producer
- Tony Visconti – producer, engineer, mixing
- David Richards – engineer
- Eugene Chaplin – assistant engineer
- Rod O'Brien – mixing engineer
- Greg Calbi – mastering engineer

== Charts and certifications ==
=== Weekly charts ===
1979 weekly chart performance for Lodger
Chart (1979)	Peak Position
Australian Albums (Kent Music Report)	11
Austrian Albums (Ö3 Austria)	13
Canadian Albums (RPM)	15
Dutch Albums (MegaCharts)	5
French Albums (SNEP)	11
Japanese Albums (Oricon)	32
New Zealand Albums (RIANZ)	3
Norwegian Albums (VG-lista)	11
Swedish Albums (Sverigetopplistan)	9
UK Albums (Official Charts)	4
US Billboard Top LPs & Tape	20

2016 weekly chart performance for Lodger
Chart (2016)	Peak Position
UK Albums (Official Charts)	64

=== Year-end charts ===
1979 year-end chart performance for Lodger
Chart (1979)	Position
Australian Albums (Kent Music Report)	67
Canadian Albums (RPM)	72
Dutch Albums (MegaCharts)	55
French Albums (SNEP)	58
UK Albums (OCC)	40

=== Certifications ===
Certifications for Lodger
Region	Certification	Certified units/sales
Netherlands (NVPI)	Gold	50,000^{^}
United Kingdom (BPI)	Gold	100,000^{^}
Summaries
Worldwide	—	2,200,000
^{^} Shipments figures based on certification alone.
