= Sarah Putnam =

Sarah Putnam may refer to:

- Sarah Gooll Putnam (1851–1912), American painter
- Sarah Ann Brock Putnam (1831–1911), American author
