= Boys Keep Swinging =

1979 song by David Bowie

Single by David Bowie

from the album Lodger
- B-side: "Fantastic Voyage"
- Released: 27 April 1979
- Recorded: September 1978, March 1979
- Studio: Mountain (Montreux, Switzerland); Record Plant (New York City)
- Genre: Glam rock; funk; new wave
- Length: 3:17
- Label: RCA
- Songwriters: David Bowie; Brian Eno
- Producers: David Bowie; Tony Visconti

David Bowie singles chronology
"Breaking Glass" (1978)	"Boys Keep Swinging" (1979)	"D.J." (1979)

Music video
- "Boys Keep Swinging" on YouTube

"Boys Keep Swinging" is a song by the English musician David Bowie, released on 27 April 1979 by RCA Records in the United Kingdom as the lead single from his 1979 album Lodger. It was written by Bowie and Brian Eno and recorded in Montreux and New York City in September 1978 and March 1979. The recording utilised techniques from Eno's Oblique Strategies cards, which resulted in the musicians swapping instruments. Adrian Belew contributed a guitar solo, which he played receiving little guidance and was composited from multiple takes. The song was also built on the same chord sequence as the album track "Fantastic Voyage". Musically, "Boys Keep Swinging" contains elements of glam rock, funk and new wave; lyrically, it deals with the concept of gender identity, featuring various gender-bending lyrics. Bowie asserted that the lyrics were ironic.

Bowie filmed a promotional video for "Boys Keep Swinging" alongside an appearance on The Kenny Everett Video Show. Both were directed by David Mallet, marking the first in a series of collaborations with Bowie. The video features Bowie as himself and three backing dancers dressed in drag. The video helped the single reach number seven on the UK Singles Chart, his highest chart placement in two years. Bowie gave an acclaimed performance of the song on Saturday Night Live in December 1979 and later revived it for his 1995 Outside Tour. Although it received mixed reviews on release, commentators have reacted more positively to "Boys Keep Swinging" in later decades, with some naming it one of Bowie's best songs. It has appeared on several compilation albums and was covered by the Associates in late 1979, whose version earned them their first recording contract.

== Recording ==
"Boys Keep Swinging" was written by David Bowie and Brian Eno during the sessions for Lodger (1979). Co-produced by Bowie and Tony Visconti, the backing tracks were recorded at Mountain Studios in Montreux, Switzerland in September 1978, while vocals and overdubs were completed at the Record Plant in New York City in March 1979. The sessions saw Bowie and Eno utilise techniques from Eno's Oblique Strategies cards. According to biographer Chris O'Leary, these cards were "part-fortune cookie, part-Monopoly 'Chance' cards", intended to spark creative ideas. Eno and Bowie had used them previously on "Heroes" (1977).

After a few takes, Bowie was dissatisfied with the band's progress, finding it "sounds like professionals!" In order to sound like "young kids in the basement [who were] just discovering their instruments", Bowie had the musicians swap instruments, a trick previously utilised during the recording of Iggy Pop's Lust for Life in 1977. Guitarist Carlos Alomar switched to drums, drummer Dennis Davis moved to bass guitar and bassist George Murray moved to keyboards. However, Murray's contribution was omitted from the final mix, while Davis's part was deemed unsuitable and re-recorded by Visconti, who played an "over-the-top" part in a style similar to his playing on Bowie's 1970 album The Man Who Sold the World. Several commentators found the part reminiscent of the Beach Boys' "You're So Good to Me" (1965).

Future King Crimson guitarist Adrian Belew contributed a solo towards the end of the song, which was composited from multiple takes. Before he played, Bowie told Belew that Alomar was playing drums but gave little guidance regarding the music. He later stated: "It was like a freight train coming through my mind. I just had to cling on." Speaking with biographer David Buckley, Belew stated that Bowie wrote the lyrics and recorded his vocals for the song in just seven days. He also recalled that after Bowie completed the vocals, "He played it to me and said, 'This is written after you, in the spirit of you.' I think he saw me as a naive person who just enjoyed life. I was thrilled with that."

== Music and lyrics ==
The glory in that song was ironic. I do not feel that there is anything remotely glorious about being either male or female. I was merely playing on the idea of the colonization of a gender.

— David Bowie, 2000

"Boys Keep Swinging" uses the same chord sequence as fellow Lodger track "Fantastic Voyage", although biographers note that "Boys" is more "tense" and "upbeat"; author Peter Doggett contends that its structure acts "like a bumper car". Musically, The Quietus found "Boys" to be "a jolly, frivolous glam garage stomp"; O'Leary similarly states that the song represents "an end to Bowie's glam years". Some commentators found elements of funk in the track, with Uncut calling it "neurotic funk ála Talking Heads", and Ultimate Classic Rock finding it "updates Bowie's funk era via a punk attitude". Dave Thompson felt that the song was indebted to the then-rising new wave scene. Simon House plays violin on the track, whose contribution O'Leary calls a "sawing background drone" akin to the Velvet Underground's "I'm Waiting for the Man". Mike Powell of Pitchfork compared the song's camp sensibility to the Village People, but noted that "Boys" is "less secure about its sexuality".

Lyrically, "Boys Keep Swinging" deals with the concept of gender identity, featuring numerous gender-bending lyrics such as "when you're a boy, other boys check you out". Doggett states that the song reinforces the "male gang mentality", a concept Bowie was familiar with during the 1960s. Various commentators have provided interpretations for "Boys". O'Leary interprets the song as "a boy's idea of manhood as being like hinging a Scout troop", evidenced by the lyrics "Uncage the colours! Unfurl the flag!" On release, Jon Savage of Melody Maker analysed the track as "a vaguely homoerotic, Ladybird look at male adolescence", while in 2008, Uncut's Chris Roberts described it as "a tongue-in-cheek, camp dig at American values". Author James Perone argues that within the context on Lodger, "Boys" presents various stereotypes that are expected of males, such as militarism and the idea that all they need to do is keep trying to "work it out". However, the song itself does not answer questions raised that counteract these stereotypes; he notes that the album's next track, "Repetition", does give an example on how to deal with frustration. Bowie himself later stated that the song was full of irony.

== Release ==
RCA Records issued "Boys Keep Swinging" in the United Kingdom on 27 April 1979, with the catalogue number RCA BOW 2 and album track "Fantastic Voyage" as the B-side. To promote the song, Bowie appeared on The Kenny Everett Video Show four days earlier. According to biographer Nicholas Pegg, he dressed in a "1950s Mod-style suit" that made him look like a "fresh-faced schoolboy". The director of the programme was David Mallet, whom Bowie chose to direct a promotional video for "Boys", becoming the first in a series of music video collaborations between the two men. The message 'Your bicameral mind...mind your bicameral' is written on the run-out groove of the single vinyl.

The promo and Everett performance were filmed back-to-back, although the former featured extra backup dancers who turned out to be Bowie in drag. For the first girl, Bowie want "a 50s-type girl from the Midlands, a gum-chewing, working-class 'tart'"; the second was dressed like actress Lauren Bacall; the third was a combination of actresses Marlene Dietrich and Greta Garbo. At the end of the promo, two of the dancers turn to the camera, remove their wigs and smear their makeup in a style Bowie borrowed from Dutch dancer Romy Haag after observing her at a Berlin nightclub. The final dancer simply blows a kiss into the camera. Regarding the smearing bit, Bowie stated: "That was a well-known drag act finale gesture which I appropriated. I really liked the idea of screwing up [the] make-up after all the meticulous work that had gone into it. It was a nice destructive thing to do – quite anarchistic." The smearing gesture would later be used in the videos for "China Girl" (1983) and "Jump They Say" (1993). According to Buckley, when the video was broadcast on BBC's Top of the Pops, the BBC received numerous complaints from shocked viewers.

The video and Everett performance, along with an appearance as the guest DJ on Radio 1's Star Special, helped "Boys Keep Swinging" reach number seven on the UK Singles Chart after a downturn, becoming Bowie's highest-charting single since "Sound and Vision" two years earlier. The song also peaked at number 19 on the Irish Singles Chart. However, due to the song's gender-bending video and lyrics, RCA refused to release the single in the United States, as they had done with "John, I'm Only Dancing" in 1972, choosing "Look Back in Anger" instead.

=== Saturday Night Live performance ===
Bowie's performance of "Boys Keep Swinging" on Saturday Night Live has been widely praised as one of the artist's best performances and among the show's most memorable moments.

Bowie recorded performances of "Boys Keep Swinging", along with "The Man Who Sold the World" (1970) and "TVC 15" (1976), for Saturday Night Live on 15 December 1979, although it was not broadcast until 5 January 1980. Bowie was joined by Alomar, Murray, Davis, Isolar I tour guitarist Stacey Heydon, Blondie keyboardist Jimmy Destri, and backing singers Klaus Nomi and Joey Arias. For the performance of "Boys", Bowie's head was superimposed over a puppet body being operated by himself. He based the set on a German act he witnessed, which "gave the effect of a human-headed marionette". The show's producers censored the line "other boys will check you out". Pegg calls the performance "one of Bowie's finest television appearances", while Marc Spitz considered it "one of the best and strangest moments" in SNL history. Rolling Stone later ranked Bowie's appearance the seventh best musical performance in SNL history in 2017. Two years later, Bowie's official website called the performance "a piece of TV history" that "remains among the most surreal television performances broadcast anywhere, ever". Bowie later revived "Boys Keep Swinging" for the 1995 Outside Tour.

== Critical reception ==
"Boys Keep Swinging" received mixed reviews from music critics, as did its parent album. The song earned a positive review in Smash Hits, who called the single Bowie's "best in ages". Savage, on the other hand, found it better suited on the album than as a single. In a more negative review, Rolling Stone's Greil Marcus found "Boys" "so [full of irony] that it ceases to have any meaning at all. The song even fails to achieve the meaning of pure pop meaninglessness, because it so obviously wants to mean something." Paul Yamada of New York Rocker felt the song was the most "adventurous" on the LP, but it lacked overall satisfaction: "Why couldn't this have been worked into something truly worthwhile?" The Chicago Tribune's Lynn Van Matre expressed disappointment with Lodger but felt that "Boys Keep Swinging" would be entertaining for longtime Bowie fans.

In later decades, "Boys Keep Swinging" has received more positive reviews. Writing for The Rolling Stone Album Guide in 2004, Rob Sheffield commented on the "razor-sharp musical corners" and "new layers of wit and generosity in the songwriting" on Lodger, highlighting "Boys Keep Swinging", "D.J." and "Fantastic Voyage". In AllMusic, Dave Thompson called "Boys" "one of Bowie's most simplistically effective constructions", further writing that the song "erupts with an almost amateurish enthusiasm, clattering and clonking to delirious effect". The same publication's Stephen Thomas Erlewine, in his review for Lodger, cited "Boys", "D.J." and "Look Back in Anger" as songs that "have strong melodic hooks that are subverted and strengthened by the layered, dissonant productions". In Ultimate Classic Rock, Bryan Wawzenek considered "Boys" and "Fantastic Voyage" the two best songs on the album.

In lists of Bowie's best songs by Uncut and Mojo, the song was voted numbers 29 and 25, respectively. In 2016, Ultimate Classic Rock placed the single at number 42 in a list ranking every Bowie single from worst to best. Four years later, Alexis Petridis of The Guardian called "Boys Keep Swinging" Bowie's 12th greatest song, which he argued, "condensed the kind of sonic overload found on ''Heroes'' into a sparky three-minute pop song, complete with lyrics that archly, camply celebrated machismo."

== Legacy ==
"Boys Keep Swinging" has appeared on several compilation albums, including The Best of Bowie (1980), The Singles Collection (1993), The Best of David Bowie 1974/1979 (1998), Best of Bowie (2002), The Platinum Collection (2006), Nothing Has Changed (2014), and Legacy (The Very Best of David Bowie) (2016). The song, along with the rest of its parent album, was remastered in 2017 for Parlophone's A New Career in a New Town (1977–1982) box set.

Numerous artists have also covered "Boys Keep Swinging". In October 1979, Scottish new wave band the Associates released a cover of the song as a way to infringe copyright and get themselves noticed. Their version, which reached number 15 in Record Mirror's Scottish chart and gained them airplay on John Peel's Radio One show, earned the band their first record contract. Band member Billy Mackenzie later said that the band recorded the song "to prove the point. It was a strange way of proving it, but it worked. People said, 'That is awful. How dare they!'" English Britpop band Blur used the same chord sequence as "Boys Keep Swinging" for their 1997 single "M.O.R.". The song's chorus also borrows the melody and call-and-response vocals from "Boys". Bowie and Eno both received writing credit for "M.O.R." after legal intervention. Further covers have been released by Shearwater, Sarah Harding, Susanna Hoffs and Duran Duran. Meanwhile, Bowie's original recording appeared in the soundtrack for 32A (2007) while Harding's version appeared in the soundtrack for St Trinian's 2: The Legend of Fritton's Gold (2009).

== Personnel ==
According to Chris O'Leary:

Musicians

- David Bowie – lead and backing vocals, electric guitar, piano
- Adrian Belew – electric guitar
- Tony Visconti – bass guitar, backing vocals
- Carlos Alomar – drums
- Brian Eno – piano, synthesiser
- Simon House – violin

Production

- David Bowie – producer
- Tony Visconti – producer, engineer

== Charts ==
Chart performance for "Boys Keep Swinging"
Chart (1979–2016)	Peak position
Australian Top 100 (Kent Music Report)	85
Belgium (Ultratop 50 Flanders)	18
Irish Singles (IRMA)	19
Netherlands (Dutch Top 40)	17
Netherlands (Single Top 100)	16
Spain (Promusicae)	51
UK Singles (Official Charts)	7
