= Peace on Earth/Little Drummer Boy =

1982 single by David Bowie and Bing Crosby

Single by David Bowie and Bing Crosby
- B-side: "Fantastic Voyage" (Bowie)
- Released: 27 November 1982
- Recorded: 11 September 1977
- Studio: ATV Elstree (Hertfordshire)
- Genre: Christmas
- Length: 4:23 (UK), 2:32 (US)
- Label: RCA
- Songwriters: Ian Fraser, Larry Grossman, Buz Kohan / Harry Simeone, K.K. Davis, Henry Onorati
- Producer: Frank Konigsberg

David Bowie singles chronology
| "Cat People (Putting Out Fire)" (1982) | "Peace on Earth/Little Drummer Boy" (1982) | "Let's Dance" (1983) |

Bing Crosby singles chronology
| "That's What Life Is All About" (1975) | "Peace on Earth/Little Drummer Boy" (1982) |

2010 US Reissue
- 2010 7" vinyl reissue by Collector's Choice Music

"Peace on Earth/Little Drummer Boy" is a Christmas song performed by English singer-songwriter David Bowie and American singer Bing Crosby. Recorded on 11 September 1977 at ATV Elstree Studios in Borehamwood for Crosby's television special Bing Crosby's Merrie Olde Christmas, the song features Crosby singing the 1941 standard "The Little Drummer Boy" while Bowie sings the counterpoint tune "Peace on Earth", written by the special's musical supervisors Ian Fraser and Larry Grossman, and scriptwriter Buz Kohan, specifically for the collaboration. The duet was one of Crosby's final recordings before his death in October 1977.

Following the special's broadcast during the 1977 holiday season, "Peace on Earth/Little Drummer Boy" became unavailable for several years. It was eventually released as a single by RCA Records in November 1982 and was a commercial success, peaking at number three on the UK Singles Chart. It was Crosby's final popular hit. It became one of the best-selling singles of Bowie's career, with total estimated sales over 400,000 in the UK alone. The song has since become a Christmas classic in the United States, Canada and United Kingdom and has been referred to by The Washington Post as "one of the most successful duets in Christmas music history".

== Background and recording ==
Although David Bowie had done little to promote his 11th studio album Low, released in January 1977, he decided to promote his 12th studio album "Heroes", released in October 1977, extensively. In September 1977, Bowie appeared on Marc Bolan's television series Marc and performed "'Heroes'". Two days later on 11 September, Bowie traveled to the ATV Elstree Studios near London to record an appearance on Bing Crosby's television special Merrie Old Christmas. Bowie's agreement to perform on the special was to record a duet with Crosby. Crosby's daughter Mary recalled that Bowie and his then-wife Angie both arrived to the studio wearing full matching makeup and bright red hair. Crosby's son Nathaniel further stated: "It almost didn't happen. I think the producers told him to take the lipstick off and take the earring out. It was just incredible to see the contrast."

The special's musical supervisors, Ian Fraser and Larry Grossman, originally intended the duo to record a straightforward rendition of "The Little Drummer Boy". However, Bowie balked at singing "Little Drummer Boy": "I hate this song. Is there something else I could sing?", Fraser recalled Bowie telling him. Scriptwriter Buz Kohan further stated that Bowie felt "Little Drummer Boy" "wasn't a good showcase for his voice". Startled, Fraser, Grossman, and Kohan found a piano in the studio's basement and wrote "Peace on Earth" as a counterpoint to "Little Drummer Boy" in just over an hour. Regarding the experience, Kohan said, "It all happened rather rapidly. I would say within an hour, we had it written and were able to present it to [Bowie] again." Crosby performed "Little Drummer Boy", while Bowie sang "Peace on Earth", which they reportedly performed after less than an hour of rehearsal. Kohan added that "Bing loved the challenge" of the arrangement, stating he "was able to transform himself without losing any of the Crosby-isms."

Before the duet, Bowie and Crosby act out a dialogue skit, described by Annie Zaleski of Ultimate Classic Rock as "hilariously forced-looking" and by author Peter Doggett as "excruciatingly staged". In the skit, Crosby is an American visitor to a British historic home, and Bowie, who lives "down the road", drops by to use the owner's piano. Bowie recognizes Crosby, asking "You're the guy who sings, right?" The pair discuss the holidays and holiday traditions and then proceed to musical subjects, with Bowie making the ironic remark that he likes "old-timers" such as John Lennon and Harry Nilsson. Bowie even quips "We sing the same songs — I even have a go at 'White Christmas'." They then sort through the sheet music on the piano, which Bowie had ostensibly come over to play, and picks out "Little Drummer Boy", describing it as "my son's favorite". Doggett remarks that the duet is performed "very much" in Crosby's style rather than Bowie's.

Bowie's appearance has been described as a "surreal" event, undertaken at a time when he was "actively trying to normalise his career". In 1978, Bowie said of Crosby: "He was fantastic. That old man knew everything about everything. He knew rock and roll backwards, even if he didn't know the music...I'm glad I met him." However, by 1999 he changed his opinion, stating "He was not there at all" and describing Crosby as "look[ing] like a little old orange sitting on a stool." He found the experience to be "bizarre" and stated to having appeared on the show primarily because "I just knew my mother liked him". Kohan was not certain if Crosby knew who Bowie was, but Fraser claimed, "I'm pretty sure he did. Bing was no idiot. If he didn't, his kids sure did." A few days after the taping, Crosby said of Bowie, "clean-cut kid and a real fine asset to the show. He sings well, has a great voice and reads lines well."

A week after taping his appearance for Marc, Marc Bolan died in a car crash. A month after recording "Peace on Earth/Little Drummer Boy", Crosby died of a heart attack on 14 October. Bowie later commented on the coincidence, stating "I was getting seriously worried about whether I should appear on TV because everyone I was going on with was kicking it the following week."

== Release ==
In the United States, Bing Crosby's Merrie Olde Christmas aired on 30 November 1977 on CBS, while in the United Kingdom, the special aired on 24 December 1977 on ITV. According to biographer Chris O'Leary, there was never a plan to release "Peace on Earth/Little Drummer Boy" as a single and as such, the original 16-track master tape of the recording was erased. Kohan later stated, "We never expected to hear about it again." The song was available for some years as a bootleg single backed with "'Heroes'". In 1982, RCA Records issued the recording as an official single; due to the erasure of the master tape, the label had to use an on-line mix, where Bowie and Crosby's vocals were picked up by a boom microphone. The single was released in November 1982, with the catalog number RCA BOW 12. The label arbitrarily placed the Lodger track "Fantastic Voyage" as the B-side. Bowie was unhappy with this move, which further soured his already strained relationship with RCA, and he left the label soon after.

The single debuted on the UK Singles Chart in November 1982 and climbed to number three. However, the single failed to chart in the US. The single proved to be one of Bowie's fastest-selling singles, having sales over 250,000 within its first month and being certified silver by the British Phonographic Industry one month after its release. The single has total estimated sales of 445,424 in the UK, giving Bowie one of his most successful singles. It has since become a perennial on British Christmas compilation albums, with the TV sequence also a regular on UK nostalgia shows.

In the United States and Canada, "Peace on Earth/Little Drummer Boy" became a staple on radio stations during the Christmas season. On 14 November 1995, Oglio Records released a special multimedia CD single of "Peace on Earth/Little Drummer Boy" which contained both the standard full-length audio version and the full-length music video of the footage from the 1977 Christmas special accessible via CD-ROM drives.

On 9 November 2010, Collector's Choice Music released a 7-inch vinyl edition of "Peace on Earth/Little Drummer Boy" on red-colored vinyl in the United States. The flip-side of the single contained a Bing Crosby/Ella Fitzgerald duet of the song "White Christmas", recorded in 1953. The single was limited to 2,000 copies.

VH1 placed the duet at number 43 on its 2000 list of "100 Greatest Rock & Roll Moments on TV".

In 2017, the track was released on the Bowie box set A New Career in a New Town (1977–1982) on the bonus CD exclusive to the set entitled Re:Call 3 released by Parlophone.

== Track listing ==
7": RCA / BOW 12 (UK)

1. "Peace on Earth/Little Drummer Boy" (Larry Grossman, Ian Fraser, Buz Kohan / Katherine K. Davis, Henry Onorati, Harry Simeone) – 4:23
2. "Fantastic Voyage" (David Bowie) – 2:55

== Personnel ==
According to biographer Chris O'Leary:

- David Bowie – vocals
- Bing Crosby – vocals
- Uncredited session players – piano, bass, drums, strings

== Charts ==
=== Weekly charts ===
David Bowie and Bing Crosby version

1982–1983 weekly chart performance
| Chart (1982–1983) | Peak position |
|---|---|
| Belgium (Ultratop 50 Flanders) | 33 |
| Ireland (IRMA) | 3 |
| Norway (VG-lista) | 6 |
| Sweden (Sverigetopplistan) | 12 |
| UK Singles (Official Charts) | 3 |

2001 weekly chart performance
| Chart (2001) | Peak position |
|---|---|
| Canada (Nielsen SoundScan) | 2 |

2006 weekly chart performance
| Chart (2006) | Peak position |
|---|---|
| UK Indie (Official Charts) | 11 |

2008 weekly chart performance
| Chart (2008) | Peak position |
|---|---|
| Austria (Ö3 Austria Top 40) | 53 |

Bandaged version

2008 weekly chart performance
| Chart (2008) | Peak position |
|---|---|
| Scottish Singles Sales (Official Charts) | 1 |
| UK Singles (Official Charts) | 3 |

=== Year-end charts ===
David Bowie and Bing Crosby version

2001 year-end chart performance
| Chart (2001) | Position |
|---|---|
| Canada (Nielsen SoundScan) | 45 |

2002 year-end chart performance
| Chart (2002) | Position |
|---|---|
| Canada (Nielsen SoundScan) | 82 |

Bandaged version

2008 year-end chart performance
| Chart (2008) | Position |
|---|---|
| UK Singles (OCC) | 194 |

== Certifications ==
Certifications and sales for "Peace on Earth/Little Drummer Boy"
| Region | Certification | Certified units/sales |
|---|---|---|
| United Kingdom (BPI) | Silver | 250,000^{^} |
^{^} Shipments figures based on certification alone.

== Other versions ==
In 2008, Welsh radio presenter Aled Jones and Sir Terry Wogan recorded the song as part of BBC's Children in Need 2008 fundraising campaign. As well as featuring the cover of "Peace on Earth/Little Drummer Boy", the single release includes covers of "Swinging on a Star", "Puff, the Magic Dragon", and "Right Said Fred", respectively performed by Clare Teal, Sally "Traffic" Boazman and the Storys, and Mark Radcliffe. Warner Music Group released the track on 8 December 2008, with Jones and Wogan credited as "Bandaged", and the cover was championed on Chris Evans Drivetime by host Chris Evans, who deemed the song "magnificent". Evans' support allowed the cover to reach number three on the UK Singles Chart, matching the peak of the original.

A remastered version, with the original vocals from Crosby and Bowie and music played by the London Symphony Orchestra was released on the compilation album, Bing At Christmas in 2019.

== Appearances in popular culture ==
- The section of the original broadcast consisting of the song briefly appeared in the Christmas-themed episode of Beavis and Butt-Head titled "A Very Special Christmas With Beavis and Butt-Head", which aired on 17 December 1993. In the episode, both Beavis and Butt-Head stare in horror and abject disgust at the video, providing no commentary, before quickly changing the channel.
- In December 2010, a number of comedians paired to perform or parody the song and video, including Jack Black and Jason Segel for College Humor; Will Ferrell and John C. Reilly for Funny or Die; Black again with Jimmy Fallon on the latter's Late Night talk show; and Paul F. Tompkins with David 'Gruber' Allen.
- Jimmy Fallon and Ricky Gervais performed a portion of the song on the 9 December 2014 episode of The Tonight Show Starring Jimmy Fallon during the skit "Lip Flip". Fallon sang Bowie's part with Gervais taking Crosby's part.
- This version of the song is the most-reported one to take out people in the Little Drummer Boy Challenge according to organiser Michael Alan Peck.
