= St. Trinian's 2: The Legend of Fritton's Gold (soundtrack) =

Soundtrack album by Various Artists
- Released: 14 December 2009
- Genre: Soundtrack
- Label: Polydor

St. Trinian's 2: The Legend of Fritton's Gold is a soundtrack album to the 2009 film St. Trinian's 2: The Legend of Fritton's Gold. It was released on December 14, 2009, via Polydor Records. It features eight songs produced by Xenomania: five by the Banned of St Trinian's and three by Girls Aloud member Sarah Harding.

== Track listing ==
No.	Title	Artist(s)	Length
1.	"Theme to St. Trinian's"	Banned of St Trinian's	4:29
2.	"Too Bad"	Sarah Harding	4:51
3.	"Up and Away"	Banned of St Trinian's	3:41
4.	"Lose Control"	The Saturdays	3:16
5.	"We Got the Beat"	Banned of St Trinian's	2:33
6.	"Kiss with a Fist"	Florence and the Machine	3:04
7.	"Make It Easy"	Sarah Harding	3:46
8.	"Saturday Night"	Noisettes	3:14
9.	"I Can Get What I Want"	Banned of St Trinian's	3:16
10.	"Keep Your Head Up"	Girls Can't Catch	3:31
11.	"Boys Keep Swinging"	Sarah Harding	3:18
12.	"You're a Disaster"	Dragonette	3:32
13.	"Jump Off"	Banned of St Trinian's	3:45
14.	"I Predict a Riot (Live at Wembley)"	Girls Aloud	4:37
15.	"Theme to St. Trinian's"	Cast of St Trinian's	3:45
