= Yassassin =

Song by David Bowie

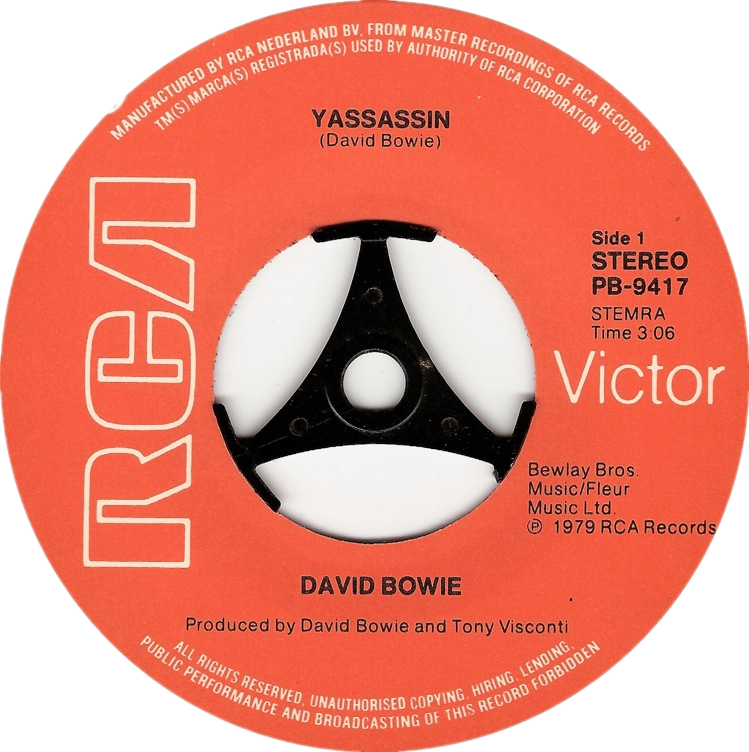

Single by David Bowie

from the album Lodger
- B-side: "Repetition" (Netherlands); "Red Money" (Turkey)
- Released: July 1979 (Netherlands)
- Recorded: Mountain, Montreux, September 1978; Record Plant, New York City, March 1979
- Length: 3:06 (single version); 4:10 (album version)
- Label: RCA; PB-9417 (Netherlands); 79.014 (Turkey)
- Songwriter: David Bowie
- Producers: David Bowie; Tony Visconti

David Bowie singles chronology
"D.J." (1979)	"Yassassin" (1979)	"Look Back in Anger" (1979)

"Yassassin" (Bowie's pronunciation /jɑːˈsɑːsɪn/; also known as "Yassassin (Turkish for: Long Live)", and released in Turkey as "Yassassin (Yaşasın)") is a song written by the English singer-songwriter David Bowie for the 1979 album Lodger. "Yassassin" is an incongruous reggae song with a Turkish flavour.

The title of the song is derived from the Turkish verb used to wish someone a long life, spelled yaşasın (pronounced [jaʃaˈsɯn]), from the verbal root yaşa- 'live' with the third-person imperative ending; therefore yaşasın literally means 'may he/she live'. The phrase “Yaşasın” is in most cases used as “Hurray!” in Turkish.

"Yassassin" was released as the third single from Lodger, but only in the Netherlands and Turkey. The Dutch single edit of the song was included on Re:Call 3, part of the A New Career in a New Town (1977–1982) compilation (2017).

== Track listing ==
=== RCA PB-9417 (Netherlands) ===
1. "Yassassin" (David Bowie) – 3:06
2. "Repetition" (Bowie) – 2:58

=== RCA 79.014 (Turkey) ===
1. "Yassassin" (Bowie)
2. "Red Money" (Bowie, Carlos Alomar)

== Personnel ==
According to Chris O'Leary:

- David Bowie – lead and background vocals, synthesiser
- Carlos Alomar – lead guitar, background vocals
- Tony Visconti – rhythm guitar, background vocals
- George Murray – bass, background vocals
- Simon House – violin, background vocals
- Dennis Davis – drums, tambourine, background vocals

Technical

- David Bowie – producer
- Tony Visconti – producer

== Cover versions ==
- The song was covered by new wave band Litfiba in 1984.
- American indie rock band Shearwater performed a version of the song in May 2016 for The A.V. Club's A.V. Undercover series, and again as part of a live performance of the entire Berlin Trilogy for WNYC in 2018.
