= Bing Crosby's Merrie Olde Christmas =

1977 American television special

- Written by: Buz Kohan
- Directed by: Dwight Hemion
- Presented by: Bing Crosby; Kathryn Crosby; Harry Crosby; Mary Crosby; Nathaniel Crosby
- Starring: Twiggy; David Bowie; Ron Moody; Stanley Baxter
- Music by: Ian Fraser; Larry Grossman
- Country of origin: United Kingdom; United States
- Original language: English

Production
- Executive producer: Frank Konigsberg
- Producers: Gary Smith; Dwight Hemion
- Cinematography: Bill Brown
- Editor: John Hawkins
- Running time: 60 minutes
- Production companies: ITC Entertainment, Konigsberg Company, Smith-Hemion Productions

Original release
- Network: CBS; ATV for ITV
- Release: November 30, 1977

Bing Crosby's Merrie Olde Christmas is a 1977 Christmas television special starring Bing Crosby and his family with special guests Twiggy, David Bowie, Ron Moody, Stanley Baxter and Trinity Boys Choir. It includes a duet by the unusual pairing of Crosby and Bowie on "Peace on Earth/Little Drummer Boy".

It was Crosby's final Christmas special, aired posthumously following his death in October 1977. The special was introduced by his widow Kathryn Crosby and was broadcast in the United States on CBS on November 30, 1977, and in the United Kingdom on ITV on December 24, 1977.

== Overview ==
Bing Crosby is surprised to receive a letter from a long-lost relative, Sir Percival Crosby, inviting the family to spend Christmas in England. Bing, his wife Kathryn and their three children – Harry, Mary and Nathaniel – fly off to Britain, reviewing their family history in song and hoping that the invitation is not a case of "mistaken identity". At Sir Percy's grand home, they meet Hudson, the butler; Mrs. Bridges, the cook; and Rose, the maid, (all of whom are impersonations by Stanley Baxter, of characters from Upstairs, Downstairs.) Percy's neighbour, David Bowie, stops by to play the piano, and Bing and Bowie chat about their musical tastes before singing a duet of "Peace on Earth/Little Drummer Boy". Kathryn chats with Mrs. Bridges in the kitchen as the children continue looking for written proof of their relation to Sir Percy.

Meanwhile, in the library, Bing is surprised to encounter the house's former owner, Charles Dickens, played by Ron Moody. They are soon joined by Twiggy, who comments on Dickens' wide array of memorable characters and several of Dickens' heroes and villains including Ebenezer Scrooge and Tiny Tim (from A Christmas Carol), Fagin and The Artful Dodger (from Oliver Twist - with Moody reprising his role as Fagin from both the 1960 stage musical and its 1968 film adaptation), Nell Trent and Daniel Quilp (from The Old Curiosity Shop), then the trio sing "What Would You Be Without Me?" (from The Roar of the Greasepaint – The Smell of the Crowd).

Twiggy and Mary search the house's attic and find some Crosby family artifacts, and Bing and Twiggy sing "Have Yourself a Merry Little Christmas". Bing introduces David Bowie's music video to his current single "Heroes" from his album of the same name. Afterward, Sir Percy (also played by Moody) finally arrives home and performs a rendition of "Side by Side by Side" with Bing and Kathryn. The family ghost, a court jester named Leslie who resembles an old pal of Bing's, stops by to crack a few jokes, and the Trinity Boys Choir soon arrives to join the family and guests on a medley featuring "Jingle Bells", "Sleigh Ride", "Winter Wonderland", "Jingle Bell Rock", "Silver Bells", "I Heard the Bells on Christmas Day" and "Carol of the Bells".

The special concludes with Bing alone in the living room wishing the audience "hope and optimism" for the new year followed by the swan song performance of "White Christmas", his signature tune and the biggest hit of his career.

== Cast ==
=== The Crosby Family ===
- Bing Crosby
- Kathryn Crosby
- Harry Crosby
- Mary Crosby
- Nathaniel Crosby

=== Special Guests ===
- Twiggy – Herself/Tiny Tim/The Artful Dodger/Nell Trent
- David Bowie – Himself
- Ron Moody – Charles Dickens/Ebenezer Scrooge/Fagin/Daniel Quilp/Sir Percival Crosby
- Stanley Baxter – Hudson/Mrs. Bridges/Rose/Leslie Townes Hope
- Trinity Boys Choir

== Songs ==
- "Crosby Ancestry Song" – Bing Crosby and family
- "Peace on Earth/Little Drummer Boy" – Bing Crosby and David Bowie
- "Where Would You Be Without Me?" – Bing Crosby, Twiggy, and Ron Moody
- "Have Yourself a Merry Little Christmas" – Bing Crosby and Twiggy
- "Heroes" (music video) – David Bowie
- "Side by Side by Side" – Bing Crosby, Kathryn Crosby, and Ron Moody
- Trinity Boys Choir Christmas Medley:
  - "Jingle Bells"
  - "Sleigh Ride"
  - "Winter Wonderland"
  - "Jingle Bell Rock"
  - "Silver Bells"
  - "I Heard the Bells on Christmas Day"
  - "Carol of the Bells"
- "White Christmas" – Bing Crosby

== "Peace on Earth/Little Drummer Boy" ==
The recording of "Peace on Earth/Little Drummer Boy" by Crosby and Bowie is the special's musical highlight and has become a Christmas classic in the United States and United Kingdom. It has been referred to by The Washington Post as "one of the most successful duets in Christmas music history".

Originally, the song selected for them to sing as a duet was "The Little Drummer Boy" but Bowie did not feel comfortable with the song and felt that his voice did not adapt well to it. Within an hour, the composer/lyricists Buz Kohan, Larry Grossman and Ian Fraser quickly came up with lyrics to "Peace on Earth" as a counterpart to Crosby and "The Little Drummer Boy". Crosby and Bowie met for the first time on the morning of the taping on September 11, 1977, at ATV Elstree Studios; they rehearsed for an hour and recorded the song in just three takes. A few days after the taping, Crosby praised Bowie as a "clean-cut kid and a real fine asset to the show. He sings well, has a great voice and reads lines well".

The track was eventually released as an official single in three different formats:

- November 27, 1982: RCA Records first released "Peace on Earth/Little Drummer Boy" as both a standard 7" single (backed with Bowie's "Fantastic Voyage") and as a 12-inch vinyl picture disc single. This first official commercial release of the track peaked at number 3 on the UK Singles Chart.
- November 14, 1995: Oglio Records released a special multimedia CD single of "Peace on Earth/Little Drummer Boy" which contained both a standard full-length audio version and the full-length music video of the footage from the 1977 Christmas special accessible via CD-ROM drives.
- November 9, 2010: Collector's Choice Music released a 7-inch single edition of "Peace on Earth/Little Drummer Boy" on red-colored vinyl in the United States, limited to 2,000 copies.

The single proved to be one of Bowie's fastest-selling singles, having sold 250,000 copies within its first month and being certified silver by the British Phonographic Industry one month after its release. The single has total estimated sales of 445,424 in the UK, giving Bowie one of his most successful singles. In the United States and Canada, "Peace on Earth/Little Drummer Boy" has since become a yearly staple on radio stations during the Christmas season.

== Production ==
The special was taped September 11, 1977, at ATV Elstree Studios in Borehamwood, England.

Bing Crosby's Merrie Olde Christmas would turn out to be the second and last posthumous music special CBS would air in 1977, airing nearly two months after Elvis Presley's last television appearance, Elvis in Concert, which was repeated in May 1978.

== Home media ==
The special was released on DVD as part of the 2-disc compilation Bing Crosby: The Television Specials – Volume 2: The Christmas Specials on November 9, 2010.
