= Peter Schmidt (artist) =

British artist (1931–1980)

The Road to the Crater

Peter Schmidt (17 May 1931 – 22 January 1980) was a Berlin-born British artist, painter, theoretician of color and composition, pioneering multimedia exhibitor and an influential teacher at Watford College of Art. He was part of a generation of art school teachers in the 1960s and 1970s who had great impact on some students who later went on to work in art and music. He worked with Hansjörg Mayer, Brian Eno, Mark Boyle, Dieter Roth and had associations with Russell Mills, David Toop and Tom Phillips.

== Biography ==
Peter Schmidt was born 17 May 1931 in Berlin, moved to England with his Jewish mother in 1938, and began painting in 1947. He studied at the Goldsmiths College from 1951 to 1953, and Slade School from 1953 to 1957. He won the Abbey Minor Travelling Scholarship 1957–58, which was spent in Sicily. On his return to England, he painted directly from objects and people, mainly in oils. His work was exhibited at Beaux Arts, with his first one-man show in 1961. He was the subject of a film called CUBISM AND BEYOND: DEPARTURES made for BBC TV in 1961. In 1963 he began a concept of painting he called PROGRAM. He produced a series of works inspired by music exhibited in a one-man show at the Curwen Gallery 1966. By this time his work had become totally abstract and he was focusing on ideas and systems. He performed an electronic music event called A PAINTERS USE OF SOUND at the ICA in 1967. Other music and performance work were at the Bristol Arts Centre, the UFO Club and, the Cochrane Theatre. He was also working with Mark Boyle at that time, performing in "Son et Lumiere" also at the Cochrane. The 1968 ICA exhibition "Cybernetic Serendipity", curated by Jasia Reichardt, had Schmidt as musical director. He performed ELECTRONIC SOUP MIX in 1969 at the Curwin Gallery, and FILM SOUND MIXES at the ICA.

In 1972 he produced a series of 64 drawings based on hexagrams of the I Ching. One of his last creative explorations in non-figurative work was a series of abstract paintings, which were illuminated by a special shifting colour light box, the electronics of which were specially designed. At this point his work gradually started to become figurative once more. In 1975 he had an exhibition at the Whitechapel Art Gallery, shared with his students at Watford School of Art, "Painting on Clothes".

During his life Schmidt explored many media and ideas. He produced a huge amount of work including books, prints, film, sound and painting. For the latter years of his life he painted in water colour, spending extended periods on the Canary Islands, the Isle of Skye off the coast of Scotland, and in Iceland painting landscapes. Although representational, Schmidt's approach was to use his theory of colour and composition developed previously. In other words, to create both an abstract and figurative painting in one.

The last exhibition Schmidt planned, called 'More Than Nothing' at Paul Ide Gallery in Brussels, was of collaborative works with Brian Eno. Among the works shown was the first generative light box, a watercolour painting of Eno called "Portrait of Eno with Allusions", several Tiger Mountain prints, the French edition of the oracle card set called Oblique Strategies, the four "Mandala Castles" and etchings created especially for this event.

Schmidt was on holiday on La Gomera in the Canary Islands when he died suddenly of a heart attack on 22 January 1980, just days before the Brussels exhibition's opening. He was survived by his brother, sister, son, daughter, their mother (and his second wife), and his third wife.

== Works ==
Schmidt met Brian Eno as a visiting lecturer at Ipswich art school in the late 1960s and later became a friend and collaborator. They found they had both independently arrived at a system of using little quotes and axioms to overcome artistic obstacles. They combined efforts to publish the Oblique Strategies cards in 1975. Brian Eno commented on Schmidt. The Oblique Strategies seem to have been an outgrowth of Schmidt's own "Thoughts Behind The Thoughts".

Schmidt has two prints from 1971, both called "Flowing in the Right Direction" in the Tate Collection. Five of Schmidt's Monoprints from late 1968 are in the UK Government Art Collection that maintains and exhibits works in various government buildings. Several of these Monoprints can be seen in the James Bond 007 film "On Her Majesty's Secret Service."

Schmidt created 1500 different silk screen portraits of Eno, four of which are used on the cover of the LP Taking Tiger Mountain. The Robert Fripp and Brian Eno LP Evening Star has on its cover a Schmidt painting.

Eno included four watercolour prints of Schmidt's work with the first edition of his LP Before and after Science and wrote in its liner notes: "Apart from our collaboration on this record, Peter and I have been working together and comparing notes for some time. In 1975 we produced a boxed set of oracle cards called 'Oblique Strategies', which were used extensively in the making of this record."

Schmidt created the water colour painting, "Portrait of Eno with Allusions" originally considered for the cover of the "Before and After Science" LP.

Many of his later works were abstract/realist landscapes produced and sold in Iceland. His work was collected by the actors Terence Stamp and Julie Christie.

== Publications ==
- "futura 24 – programmed squares 11" (An edition of 300). Broadsheet published by Edition Hansjoerg Mayer, Stuttgart, 1968.
- "ROTAPRINTS" (An edition of 26 (A-Z) plus 10 proof copies). Published by Edition Hansjoerg Mayer, Stuttgart, 1968.
- "Electrostatic Portraits", (An edition of 25). Published by Edition Hansjoerg Mayer, Stuttgart, 1968.
- "Im Kopf – In The Head - A Book of Drawings" (An edition of 250 copies). A book of line drawings, a psycho-philosophical analysis of the human mind. The cover is embossed with one of these drawings. Published by Peter Schmidt, London, 1969.
- "Peter Schmidt Autobiographical Monoprints" (An edition of 400 each copy has a unique set of color prints). A 78-page booklet, with an analytical introduction by Jasia Reichardt, to accompany an exhibition at Lisson Gallery. These monoprints were made between July and November 1969, incorporating elements from 1947 to 1969, "In choosing the material to work with I tried to revisit and own up to every aspect of my life. I found that the things that were most painful to use were the best to use." Published by Lisson Gallery, London, 1970
- "The Thoughts Behind the Thoughts". (An edition of 100). A wooden box containing 55 original cards, letter press on old prints with a perspex lid. Published by Peter Schmidt, London, 1970.
- "Everyday Third Eye Vision" (Broadsheet) Published by Peter Schmidt, London, 1972.
- "Flikker Book 7", Published by Editions Alecto, 1972.
- "Printed in Watford" (An edition of 1000). Published by Watford School of Art, 1974.
- "The Lord's Prayer Hung on the Tree of Life" (Broadsheet) Published by Peter Schmidt, London, 1974.
- "Sketchmaps"(An edition of 100). Published by Peter Schmidt, London, 1974.
- "Mother and Daughter", Published by Peter Schmidt, London, 1974.
- "A Meeting with Kali", Published by Peter Schmidt, London, 1975.
- "Oblique Strategies", with Brian Eno, an edition of 500 copies. "Over one hundred worthwhile dilemmas by BRIAN ENO and PETER SCHMIDT" (actually 113 worthwhile dilemmas and four or five blank cards). Published by EG Management, 1975.
- "a secret in stone", a book of Schmidt's poetry, with drawings by Patrick Hourihan, an edition of 500 copies. Published by Watford School of Art, 1979.

== Exhibitions ==
Peter Schmidt had exhibitions at:

- Beaux Arts Gallery, London – 1961
- Curwen Gallery, London – 1966
- Gallerie Hansjorg Mayer, Stuttgart – 1967
- Lisson Gallery, London; Editions Alecto Gallery, London – 1968
- Bear Lane Gallery, London; Curwen Gallery, London – 1969
- Lisson Gallery, London – 1970
- White Chapel Gallery, London – 1975
- JPL Fine Arts, "Watercolours", London – 1977
- Galerie Shandar, Paris; Galleri Sudurgata 7, Reykjavik; Sundholl Gallery, Isafordor; Caius College Gallery, Cambridge – 1978
- Paul Ide Gallery, Brussels; Galleri Sudurgata 7, Reykjavik; Vertshuis Gallery, Flatey – 1979
- Paul Ide Gallery (with Brian Eno) "More Than Nothing", Brussels – 1980
- Watford Museum, "Remembered Images", Watford – 1987
- The Living Art Museum, "Icelandic Landscapes", Reykjavik – 1995
- Mummery & Schnelle, "To Become Like Music", London – 2008

== Quotes ==
- "One of the functions of art is to offer a more desirable reality; a model as it were, of another style of existence with its own pace and its own cultural reference." Peter Schmidt
- "In a roomful of shouting people, the one who whispers becomes interesting." Peter Schmidt
- "My friend Peter Schmidt used to talk about ‘not doing the things that nobody had ever thought of not doing’, which is an inverse process – where you leave out an assumption that everybody has always made and see what happens (e.g. music has to be made of intentionally produced sounds was the assumption that Cage left out)." Brian Eno, in A Year With Swollen Appendices, p. 178
- "He was enigmatic and tried to get us to approach things from different angles. Not however, in an analytical way though he could be very analytical, it was more to do with looking for the mysterious invisible centre of experience." Linda Landers, former student
- "These cards evolved from our separate observations on the principles underlying what we were doing. Sometimes they were recognized in retrospect (intellect catching up with intuition), sometimes they were identified as they were happening, sometimes they were formulated. They can be used as a pack (a set of possibilities being continuously reviewed in the mind) or by drawing a single card from the shuffled pack when a dilemma occurs in a working situation. In this case, the card is trusted even if its appropriateness is quite unclear. They are not final, as new ideas will present themselves, and others will become self-evident." Brian Eno/Peter Schmidt – Card No. 2 from Oblique Strategies, 1975
- "...During the past two years, Peter Schmidt has restricted his work almost exclusively to water colours, that curious medium which seems to stand on the borderline between 'Sunday painting' and 'serious painting'. I believe that this ambiguity itself has been a major reason for his continued use of the medium, for it allows pictorial events which can be light-hearted and ephemeral, and at the same time brooding and mysterious. The medium does not stipulate a particular emotional range, and presents itself to a perceiver in a kind of innocent and understated way – as if with a lowered voice. It seems that at a time when the currency of the day is to engage in productions that are in some way epic – be it in terms of scale, loudness or detail – that which is simple and quiet suddenly becomes relevant. It is talking in a new way..." Brian Eno, 1978
- "Travel was necessary to enable Peter to paint. He longed for solitude and sought to investigate the influence solitude had on his perception of the world about him. Painting itself was for him just a part of the creative process. He went for walks, submitting himself to the influence of whatever met his eye. He did not take with him a sketchbook or any paint-tools, but when he had finished his walk he emptied his mind of all superfluities and painted from memory what remained there." Eggert Pétursson, from the "Icelandic Landscapes" exhibition catalogue, 1995
- "Each year the students would create a book that was printed and bound in the college. Eduardo Paolozzi did his Abba Zabba there one year. 'Printed in Watford' was done by the year above me, our year was 'Constructive Anachronisms For Supportive Analysis' (a book about Shelf Brackets) with Hansjorg Meyer. The following year, however I did a magazine with Peter Schmidt, The Foundation Course and Brian Eno called 'The Humble Meek'. It was like an up-market religious pamphlet spoofing an entire religion foisted onto the banal wise-words of a made-up Watford Housewife. There was a twist to it all as well. I have a pile of these still, I sold them in Record Shops and the right kind of bookshop, and we got rid of hundreds of the buggers. 'Irene Williams' she was called and we had just the one photo of her, rescued from a photo booth in London. The point of this is to show that Peter was amazingly playful and had a tremendous sense of humour, often quite wicked." Cally, a student, taken from a private correspondence, 2007

== Prints ==
The Road to the Crater

Look at September, Look at October

The Other House

Four Years
