= Fantastic Voyage (David Bowie song) =

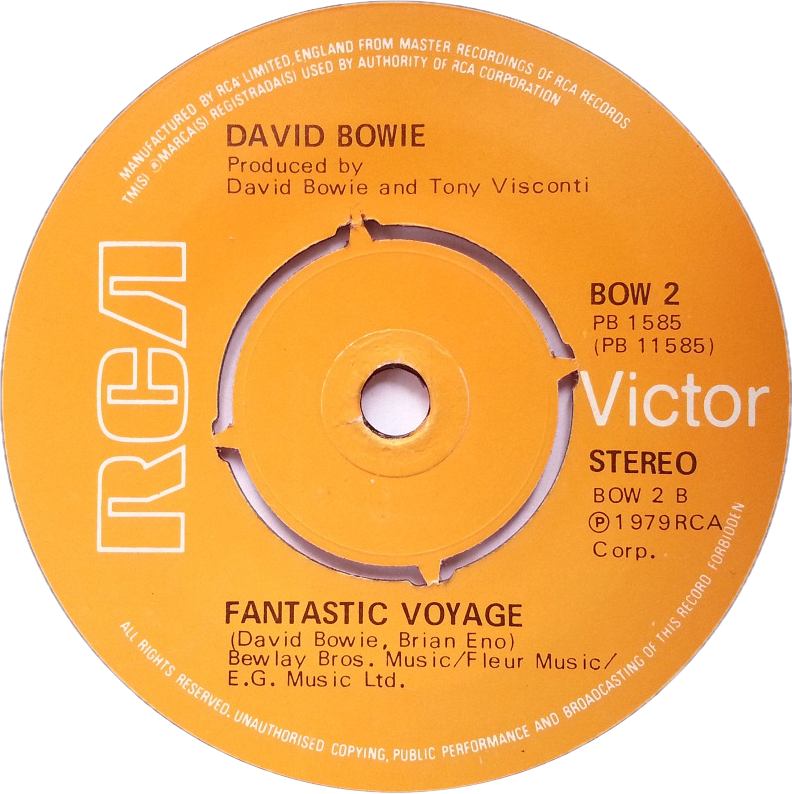

Song by David Bowie

from the album Lodger
- A-side: "Boys Keep Swinging"
- Released: 25 May 1979
- Recorded: September 1978, March 1979
- Studio: Mountain (Montreux); Record Plant (New York City)
- Genre: Art rock
- Length: 2:55
- Label: RCA
- Songwriters: David Bowie, Brian Eno
- Producers: David Bowie, Tony Visconti

"Fantastic Voyage" is a song written by David Bowie and Brian Eno for the 1979 album Lodger. It has almost exactly the same chord sequence as "Boys Keep Swinging", from the same album. It has also appeared as the B-side to the "Boys Keep Swinging" and "Peace on Earth/Little Drummer Boy" singles, and the US edition of "D.J.".

== Recording ==
"Fantastic Voyage" was written by David Bowie and Brian Eno during the sessions for Lodger (1979); its working title was "Portrait of an Artist". Co-produced by Bowie and Tony Visconti, the backing tracks were recorded at Mountain Studios in Montreux, Switzerland in September 1978, while vocals and overdubs were completed at the Record Plant in New York City in March 1979. The sessions saw Bowie and Eno utilise techniques from Eno's Oblique Strategies cards. According to biographer Chris O'Leary, these cards were "part-fortune cookie, part-Monopoly 'Chance' cards", intended to spark creative ideas. Eno and Bowie used them previously to create some of the instrumentals for "Heroes" (1977).

== Music and lyrics ==
Biographers have described "Fantastic Voyage" as "surprisingly delicate" and "serene" following the ominousness of Low and "Heroes" (both 1977); a thought author Peter Doggett believes implies a "less intense" record. The song shares the same chord sequence as fellow album track "Boys Keep Swinging" and features three different players playing mandolin parts; each part was triple-tracked to create a total of nine parts.

== Release and reception ==
"Fantastic Voyage" first appeared as the B-side of Lodger's lead single, "Boys Keep Swinging", issued by RCA Records on 27 April 1979, It was subsequently released on Lodger on 25 May 1979, sequenced as the opening track. The song was also chosen as the B-side of the "Peace on Earth/Little Drummer Boy" single—Bowie's Christmas duet with Bing Crosby—in 1982. The song, along with the rest of its parent album, was remastered in 2017 for Parlophone's A New Career in a New Town (1977–1982) box set.

"Fantastic Voyage" was performed for the first time on stage for the A Reality Tour in 2003. Bowie said at the time that it was a song "I've always liked and I've never done, so it's rather thrilling to do." According to biographer Nicholas Pegg, "It was a good choice politically as well as aesthetically: in the global climate of the Iraq war and its aftermath, the sentiments expressed in 'Fantastic Voyage' had never seemed more appropriate." A November 2003 live performance is included on the A Reality Tour DVD, released in 2004, as well as the A Reality Tour album, released in 2010. It was one of the last songs Bowie performed live on stage before his retirement from live performances in late 2006 (alongside 1971's "Changes" and 1976's "Wild Is the Wind").

Writing for The Rolling Stone Album Guide in 2004, Rob Sheffield commented on the "razor-sharp musical corners" and "new layers of wit and generosity in the songwriting" on Lodger, highlighting "Boys Keep Swinging", "D.J." and "Fantastic Voyage". In Ultimate Classic Rock, Bryan Wawzenek considered "Boys Keep Swinging" and "Fantastic Voyage" the two best songs on the album. In a 2015 list compiling Bowie's best songs by Mojo magazine, the song was voted number 43. Following Bowie's death in January 2016, Rolling Stone named "Fantastic Voyage" one of the 30 most essential songs of Bowie's catalogue. The Guardian's Alexis Petridis placed it at number 45 in a list ranking Bowie's 50 greatest songs in 2020.

== Cover versions ==
- American indie rock band Shearwater performed a version of the song in May 2016 for The A.V. Club's A.V. Undercover series, and again as part of a live performance of the entire Berlin Trilogy for WNYC in 2018

== Personnel ==
According to Chris O'Leary:

- David Bowie – lead and backing vocals, piano
- Carlos Alomar – rhythm guitar
- Dennis Davis – drums
- George Murray – bass
- Sean Mayes – piano
- Simon House – mandolin
- Adrian Belew – mandolin
- Tony Visconti – mandolin, background vocals
- Brian Eno – ambient drone

Production

- David Bowie – producer
- Tony Visconti – producer, engineer
