= Look Back in Anger (song) =

Song by David Bowie

Single by David Bowie

from the album Lodger
- B-side: "Repetition"
- Released: 20 August 1979 (US)
- Recorded: September 1978; March 1979
- Studio: Mountain, Montreux; Record Plant, New York City
- Length: 3:08
- Label: RCA
- Songwriters: David Bowie; Brian Eno
- Producers: David Bowie; Tony Visconti

David Bowie singles chronology
"Yassassin" (1979)	"Look Back in Anger" (1979)	"John, I'm Only Dancing (Again)" (1979)

Music video
- "Look Back In Anger" on YouTube

"Look Back in Anger" is a song written by the English musicians David Bowie and Brian Eno for the album Lodger (1979). It concerns "a tatty 'Angel of Death'", and features a guitar solo by Carlos Alomar.

RCA Records was unsure if America was ready for the sexual androgyny of "Boys Keep Swinging", the lead-off single from Lodger in most territories, and "Look Back in Anger" was issued instead. The B-side was another track from Lodger called "Repetition", a story of domestic violence. The single failed to chart.

Beyond the shared title, the song has nothing to do with the John Osborne play Look Back in Anger (1956). Bowie performed the song on his 1983 Serious Moonlight Tour (it is the opening number on the Serious Moonlight film) and reworked it in the mid-1990s as a heavy rock song for the Outside, Earthling, Heathen tours.

== Critical reception ==
"Look Back in Anger" has a mixed reputation among Bowie commentators. NME critics Roy Carr and Charles Shaar Murray described it as "probably the low point" of the album, while Nicholas Pegg considers it "one of Lodger's dramatic highlights" and Chris O'Leary has called it "one of Bowie's strongest songs of the late Seventies".

== Track listing ==
1. "Look Back in Anger" (David Bowie, Brian Eno) – 3:08
2. "Repetition" (Bowie) – 2:59

== Personnel ==
- Producers:
  - Tony Visconti
  - David Bowie
- Musicians:
  - David Bowie: vocals, guitar
  - Dennis Davis: drums
  - George Murray: bass
  - Carlos Alomar: guitar
  - Sean Mayes: piano
  - Brian Eno: synthesizer, horse trumpet, Eroica horn
  - Tony Visconti: backing vocals

== Music video ==
David Mallet directed a music video for the song, featuring Bowie in an artist's studio. The scenario was based on the conclusion of Oscar Wilde's The Picture of Dorian Gray, as a self-portrait of the protagonist grows more handsome while he himself physically decays.

== Other releases ==
"Look Back in Anger" has appeared on the following compilations: Chameleon (Australia/New Zealand 1979), Christiane F. soundtrack (1981), Golden Years (1983), Sound + Vision (1989), The Singles Collection (1993), The Best of David Bowie 1974/1979 (1998), and The Platinum Collection (2005/2006).

A concert performance recorded on 12 September 1983 may be heard on the live album Serious Moonlight (Live '83), which was part of the 2018 box set Loving the Alien (1983-1988) and was released separately the following year. The filmed performance appears on the concert video Serious Moonlight.

In summer 1988 Bowie recorded a "new, brutal version of the song" with Reeves Gabrels on lead guitar, Kevin Armstrong on rhythm guitar, and Erdal Kizilcay on bass and drums; it was the first arrangement Bowie and Gabrels collaborated on, taking place shortly before the formation of the band Tin Machine. The recording was issued as a bonus track on the Rykodisc release of Lodger in 1991.

Bowie subsequently performed the song on several of his later tours, including the 1995 Outside Tour, the 1997 Earthling Tour, and his 2002 Heathen Tour. Live versions from the 1995 tour were included on Ouvrez le Chien (Live Dallas 95) and No Trendy Réchauffé (Live Birmingham 95) (both released in 2020).
