= Oblique Strategies =

Set of cards intended to promote creativity

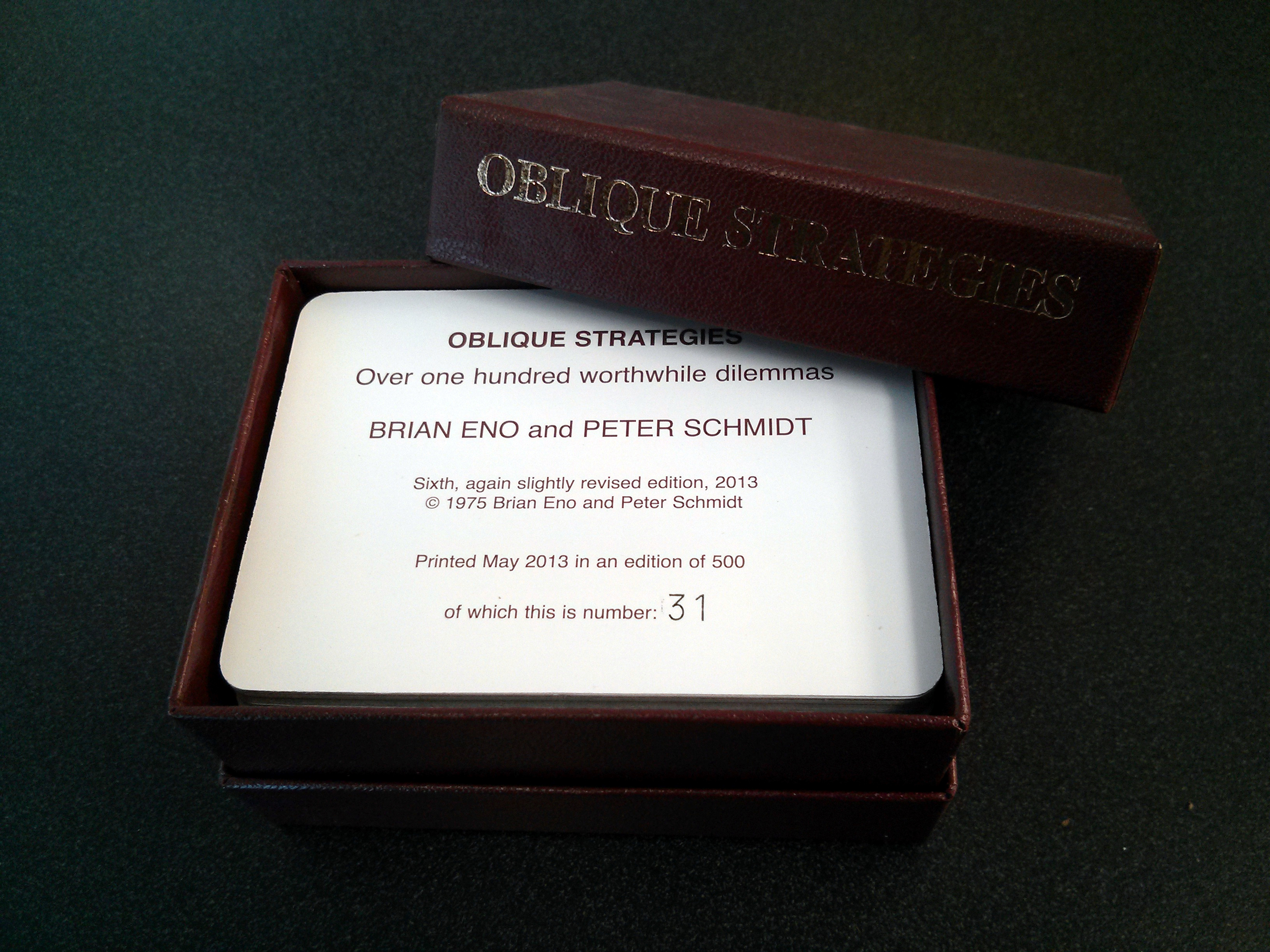
Packaging of Oblique Strategies

Oblique Strategies (subtitled Over One Hundred Worthwhile Dilemmas) is a method for promoting creativity jointly by the musician Brian Eno and the multimedia artist Peter Schmidt, first published in 1975. It consists of a deck of cards, each offering a challenging constraint intended to encourage lateral thinking and break writer's block.

== Origin and history ==
In 1970, Peter Schmidt created "The Thoughts Behind the Thoughts", a box containing 55 sentences letterpress printed onto disused prints that accumulated in his studio, which is still in Eno's possession. Eno, who had known Schmidt since the late 1960s, had been pursuing a similar project himself, which he had handwritten onto a number of bamboo cards and given the name "Oblique Strategies" in 1974. There was a significant overlap between the two projects, and so, in late 1974, Schmidt and Eno combined them into a single pack of cards and offered them for general sale. The set went through three limited edition printings before Schmidt suddenly died in early 1980, after which the card decks became rather rare and expensive. Sixteen years later software pioneer Peter Norton convinced Eno to let him create a fourth edition as Christmas gifts for his friends (not for sale, although they occasionally come up at auction). Eno's decision to revisit the cards and his collaboration with Norton in revising them is described in detail in his 1996 book A Year with Swollen Appendices. With public interest in the cards undiminished, in 2001 Eno once again produced a new set of Oblique Strategies cards. The number and content of the cards vary according to the edition. In May 2013 a limited edition of 500 boxes, in burgundy rather than black, was issued.

The story of Oblique Strategies, along with the content of all the cards, exhaustive history and commentary, is documented in a website widely acknowledged as the authoritative source and put together by musician and educator Gregory Alan Taylor. The text of Schmidt's "The Thoughts Behind the Thoughts" was published by Mindmade Books in 2012.

== Design and use ==
Each card contains a gnomic suggestion, aphorism or remark which can be used to break a deadlock or dilemma situation. A few are specific to music composition; others are more general. For example:

- Use an old idea.
- State the problem in words as clearly as possible.
- Only one element of each kind.
- What would your closest friend do?
- What to increase? What to reduce?
- Are there sections? Consider transitions.
- Try faking it!
- Honour thy error as a hidden intention.
- Ask your body.
- Work at a different speed.

From the introduction to the 2001 edition:

These cards evolved from separate observations of the principles underlying what we were doing. Sometimes they were recognised in retrospect (intellect catching up with intuition), sometimes they were identified as they were happening, sometimes they were formulated. They can be used as a pack, or by drawing a single card from the shuffled pack when a dilemma occurs in a working situation. In this case the card is trusted even if its appropriateness is quite unclear...

== Cultural impact ==
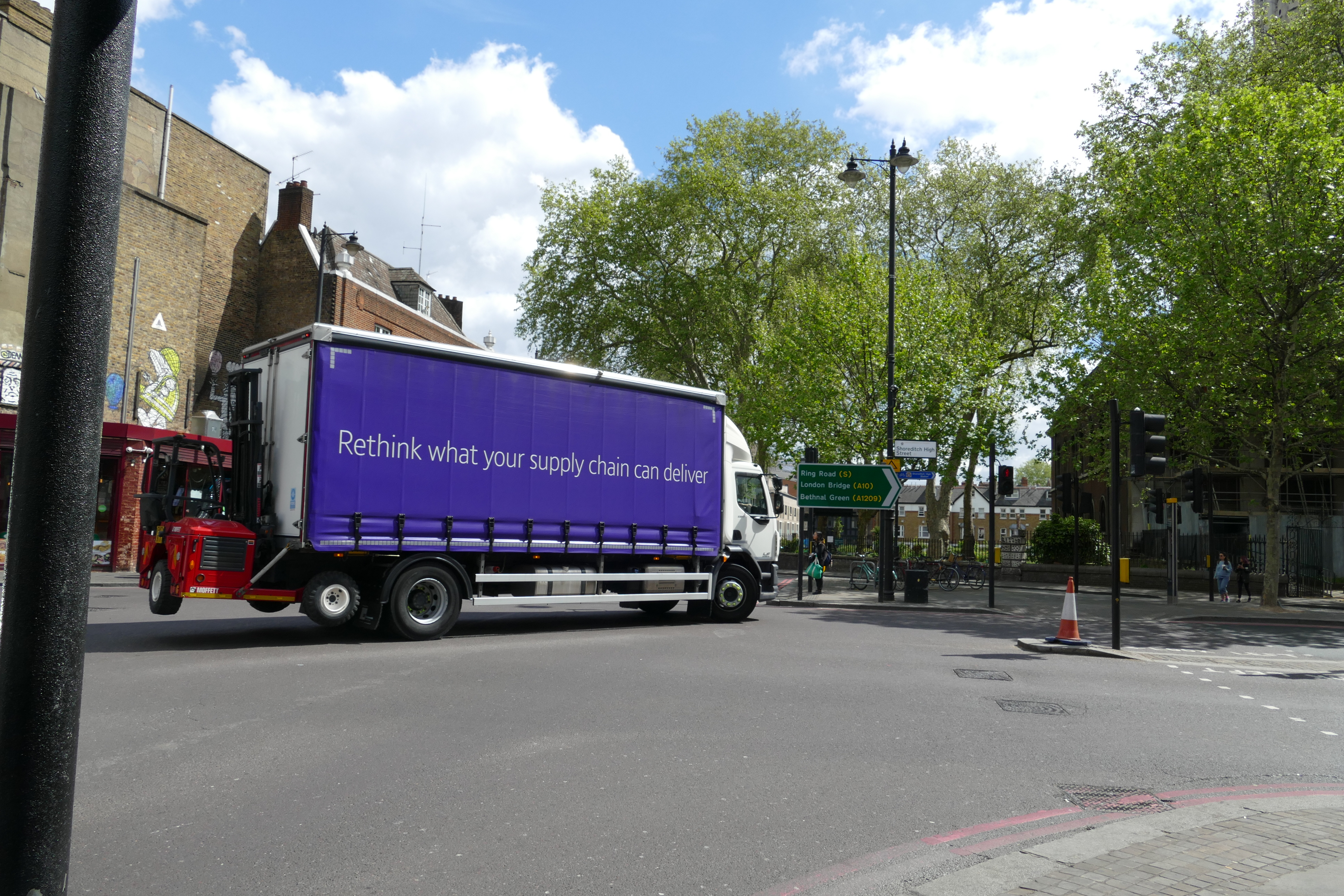
A truck with advice inspired from Oblique Strategies

References to Oblique Strategies exist in popular culture, notably in the film Slacker, in which a character offers passers-by cards from a deck. Strategies mentioned include "Honor thy error as a hidden intention", "Look closely at the most embarrassing details and amplify", "Not building a wall; making a brick", "Repetition is a form of change", and one which came to be seen as a summary of the film's ethos (though it was not part of the official set of Oblique Strategies), "Withdrawing in disgust is not the same thing as apathy." This line was quoted in the 1994 song "What's the Frequency, Kenneth?" by R.E.M., who also mentioned Oblique Strategies in their 1998 song "Diminished" from the album Up. The Oblique Strategies are also referenced in comic 1018, "Oblique Angles", of popular web comic Questionable Content.

Other musicians inspired by Oblique Strategies include the British band Coldplay, said to have used the cards when recording their 2008 Brian Eno-produced album Viva la Vida or Death and All His Friends and French band Phoenix, who used the cards when recording their 2009 album Wolfgang Amadeus Phoenix. German musician/composer Blixa Bargeld has a similar navigation system, called Dave. In response to their song "Brian Eno", from their album Congratulations, MGMT has said they had a deck of Oblique Strategies in the studio, but they "don't know if [they] used them correctly." The band Bauhaus have used the cards for the composition of their songs. The B-52's used them in the studio when recording their first album. They were also used by LCD Soundsystem during the recording of their album This is Happening.

They were most famously used by Eno during the recording of David Bowie's Berlin triptych of albums (Low, "Heroes", Lodger). Stories suggest they were used during the recording of instrumentals on "Heroes" such as "Sense of Doubt" and were used more extensively on Lodger ("Fantastic Voyage", "Boys Keep Swinging", "Red Money"). They were used again on Bowie's 1995 album Outside, which Eno was involved with as a writer, producer and musician. Carlos Alomar, who worked with Eno and Bowie on all these albums, was a fan of using the cards, later saying "at the Center for Performing Arts at the Stevens Institute of Technology, where I teach, on the wall are Brian Eno's Oblique Strategies cards. And when my students get a mental block, I immediately direct them to that wall".

The amateur football club A.S. Velasca used the Oblique Strategies during a football match. A.S. Velasca founder Wolfgang Natlacen tasked the team manager to draw an Oblique Strategies card every five minutes and implement football strategies based on the drawn card.

In 2025 Northampton Artslab created a tribute act deck, Ambagious Tactics, to mark the 50th anniversary of the original publication of Oblique Strategies. The cards are specially commissioned contributions from over 120 different people. These include writer and magician Alan Moore; artist and musician Judy Nylon; guitarist Robert Fripp, film director Jim Jarmusch; and composer Anna Meredith. The cards were edited by writer Alistair Fruish.

== Editions and variations ==
Publication history of Oblique Strategies
Edition	Year	Number of cards	Copies	Notes
Original	1975	113	500	Individually numbered, and signed by Eno and Schmidt
Second	1978	128	1,000	Available through Eno's record label at the time, Opal Records
Third	1979	123	1,000	Advertised for sale in the EG Newsletter and elsewhere
Fourth	1996	100	4,000	Produced by the Peter Norton family with Brian Eno as Christmas gifts for his friends and colleagues (i.e. not for commercial sale). Unlike other editions, the cards feature translations into the five other most common languages (Mandarin Chinese, Hindi, Spanish, Russian and Arabic), include artwork (by Pae White) on the cards, and come in a molded white plastic container. A handful of the cards are by new contributors (Arto Lindsay, Ritva Saarikko, Dieter Rot, and Stewart Brand).
Fifth	2001	103 + 2 informational	unlimited	As of September 2025, currently on sale
Sixth	2013	106 + 2 informational	500	A limited edition in a burgundy case

== See also ==
- Aleatoric music
- Fluxus § Event score
- I Ching
- Lateral thinking
- The Lookout (album), written in part with a similar process to Oblique Strategies
- Water Yam (artist's book)
- More Dark Than Shark
- Creativity techniques
