= I Heard the Bells on Christmas Day =

Christmas carol

- by John Baptiste Calkin (1848), Johnny Marks (1956), and others
- Genre: Hymn
- Occasion: Christmas
- Text: Henry Wadsworth Longfellow (1863)
- Meter: 8.8.8.8. (L.M.)

"I Heard the Bells on Christmas Day" is a Christmas carol based on the 1864 poem "Christmas Bells" by American poet Henry Wadsworth Longfellow. The song tells of the narrator hearing Christmas bells during the American Civil War, but despairing that "hate is strong and mocks the song of peace on earth, good will to men". After much anguish and despondency the carol concludes with the bells ringing out with resolution that "God is not dead, nor doth He sleep" and that there will ultimately be "peace on earth, good will to men".

== Origin ==
In 1861, three years before writing this poem, Frances, Longfellow's beloved second wife of 18 years, was fatally burned in an accidental fire. Then in 1863, during the American Civil War, Longfellow's oldest son, Charles Appleton Longfellow, joined the Union Army without his father's blessing. Longfellow was informed by a letter dated March 14, 1863, after Charles had left. "I have tried hard to resist the temptation of going without your leave but I cannot any longer", he wrote. "I feel it to be my first duty to do what I can for my country and I would willingly lay down my life for it if it would be of any good." Charles was soon appointed as a lieutenant but, in November, he was severely wounded in the Battle of Mine Run. Charles eventually recovered, but his time as a soldier was finished.

Longfellow wrote the poem on Christmas Day in 1864. "Christmas Bells" was first published in February 1865, in Our Young Folks, a juvenile magazine published by Ticknor and Fields. References to the Civil War are prevalent in some of the verses that are not commonly sung. The refrain "peace on earth, good will to men" is a reference to the King James Version of Luke 2:14, in which angels herald the birth of Christ.

Longfellow opens the seven-quatrain poem with a stanza expressing optimism before quickly falling into the pessimistic mood reflecting the nation during the Civil War. Nevertheless, the poem concludes with a call for faith to overcome doubt and despair.

== Lyrics ==
The following are the original words of Longfellow's poem:

I heard the bells on Christmas Day
Their old, familiar carols play,
And wild and sweet
The words repeat
Of peace on earth, good-will to men!

And thought how, as the day had come,
The belfries of all Christendom
Had rolled along
The unbroken song
Of peace on earth, good-will to men!

Till ringing, singing on its way,
The world revolved from night to day,
A voice, a chime,
A chant sublime
Of peace on earth, good-will to men!

Then from each black, accursed mouth
The cannon thundered in the South,
And with the sound
The carols drowned
Of peace on earth, good-will to men!

It was as if an earthquake rent
The hearth-stones of a continent,
And made forlorn
The households born
Of peace on earth, good-will to men!

And in despair I bowed my head;
"There is no peace on earth," I said;
"For hate is strong,
And mocks the song
Of peace on earth, good-will to men!"

Then pealed the bells more loud and deep:
"God is not dead, nor doth He sleep;
The Wrong shall fail,
The Right prevail,
With peace on earth, good-will to men."

== Musical renditions ==
It was not until 1872 that the poem is known to have been set to music. The English organist, John Baptiste Calkin, used the poem in a processional accompanied with a melody "Waltham" that he previously used as early as 1848. The Calkin version of the carol was long the standard. Less commonly, the poem has also been set to Joseph Mainzer's 1845 composition "Mainzer". Harriet P. Sawyer (1862–1934) also composed a setting for the poem. Other melodies have been composed more recently, most notably in 1956 by Johnny Marks (arranged by Lee Kjelson and Margaret Shelley Vance).

Bing Crosby recorded the song on October 3, 1956, using Marks's melody and verses 1, 2, 6, 7. It was released as a single and reached No. 55 in the Music Vendor survey. The record was praised by both Billboard and Variety. Variety wrote "Bing Crosby's workover of 'I Heard the Bells on Christmas Day' looks like a big one for the '56 Yule and a hit potential of enduring value." Billboard wrote "At deadline time, not many of this year's Christmas issues had shown much action. This new Crosby record, however, was off to a promising start. As fast as it is catching on early in the month, it is easy to project the impressive volume it will rack up the last half of December." Crosby is said to have quipped to Marks: "I see you finally got yourself a decent lyricist"

Marks's tune has since received more than 60 commercial recordings, with total sales exceeding 5 million copies. Covers of the song include versions by Harry Belafonte (1958), Johnny Cash (1963), Andy Williams (1974), and Echosmith (2019), among many others.

In 2008, a contemporary Christian music group, Casting Crowns, scored their eighth No. 1 Christian hit with "I Heard the Bells on Christmas Day", from their album Peace on Earth. The song is not an exact replica of the original poem or carol, but an interpolation of verses 1, 6, 7 and 3 (in that order), interposed with a new chorus. Richard Marx also used this version for his Christmas Spirit in 2012.

== In popular culture ==
In chapter five of his 1962 novel Something Wicked This Way Comes, Ray Bradbury describes this carol as "immensely moving, overwhelming, no matter what day or what month it was sung." The carol provides an ironic contrast to the evil that Mr. Dark's carnival is about to bring to Green Town, Illinois. In the 1983 film adaptation of the novel, Mr. Dark (Jonathan Pryce) and Charles Halloway (Jason Robards) both quote passages from the carol when they meet in the town's library (though Dark ominously states that "it's a thousand years to Christmas").

I Heard the Bells from Sight & Sound Films was released in 2022 and depicts the events surrounding Longfellow's writing of the poem.

== See also ==
- Christmas in the American Civil War
- List of Christmas carols
