= Sarah Ann Brock Putnam =

American writer (1831–1911)

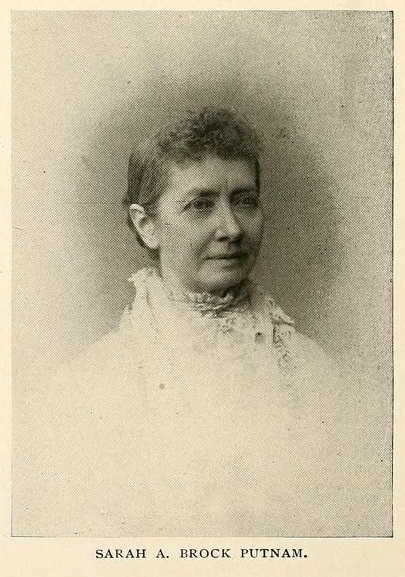
Sarah A. Brock Putnam

Sarah Ann Brock Putnam (March 18, 1831 – March 22, 1911), also known by her pen name Virginia Madison, was an American author, best known for her memoir Richmond During the War; Four Years of Personal Observation.

== Biography ==
Sarah (nickname, "Sallie") Ann Brock was born in Madison County, Virginia, on March 18, 1831. She was the daughter of Ansalem Brock and Elizabeth Beverley Buckner.

During the American Civil War, Brock lived with her family in Richmond, Virginia, the capital of the Confederate States of America. In 1865, she moved to New York and began writing about her wartime experiences.

Brock's book, Richmond During the War: Four Years of Personal Observation, was published in 1867 and described the social and economic upheaval of the residents of that city. The book was based on her diaries and notes of the period and contains details about incidents involving refugees, prisoners of war, the sick and wounded, the reality of obtaining basic supplies, and other events the city, particularly in the last few weeks of the war. Brock soon edited a collection of poetry and began writing articles as well as a novel.

She married Rev. Richard Fletcher Putnam, M.A., of the Protestant Episcopal Church.

== Selected works ==
- Richmond During the War: Four Years of Personal Observation (1867)
- The Southern Amaranth: A Carefully Selected Collection of Poems Growing out of and in Reference to the Late War (1869)
- Kenneth, My King (1873)
