= The Best of Bowie =

Greatest hits album by David Bowie
- Released: 19 December 1980
- Recorded: 1969–1979
- Genre: Rock
- Length: 58:17
- Label: K-tel
- Producer: David Bowie, Gus Dudgeon, Ken Scott, Tony Visconti, Harry Maslin

David Bowie chronology
Scary Monsters (and Super Creeps) (1980)	The Best of Bowie (1980)	Christiane F. (1981)

David Bowie compilation chronology
Changesonebowie (1976)	The Best of Bowie (1980)	Changestwobowie (1981)

Professional ratings
Review scores
Source	Rating
Allmusic	3/5 stars
The Encyclopedia of Popular Music	3/5 stars

The Best of Bowie is a compilation album by English singer-songwriter David Bowie, released in 1980 by K-tel. The cover was based on the 12-inch single sleeve design of Bowie's "Fashion". It made No. 3 in the UK Albums Chart.

In addition to including the rare 7" edits of "Fame" and "Golden Years", the compilation contains unique edits of "Life on Mars?" and "Diamond Dogs", ostensibly to allow all 16 tracks to fit on one LP. Early copies of the LP had a sticker on the back cover showing the track listing. If the sticker was removed, the original track listing could be seen, showing "Drive-In Saturday" (from Aladdin Sane, 1973) as track 7 in place of the live version of "Breaking Glass", which explains the latter's appearance out of chronological sequence here.

== Track listing ==
All songs written by David Bowie, except where noted.

Side one

1. "Space Oddity" – 5:07
2. "Life on Mars?" (K-tel edit) – 3:34
3. "Starman" – 4:07
4. "Rock 'n' Roll Suicide" – 2:56
5. "John, I'm Only Dancing" (Sax version) – 2:37
6. "The Jean Genie" – 4:03
7. "Breaking Glass" (Live from Stage) (Bowie, Dennis Davis, George Murray) – 3:27
8. "Sorrow" (Bob Feldman, Jerry Goldstein, Richard Gottehrer) – 2:51

Side two

1. "Diamond Dogs" (K-tel edit) – 4:36
2. "Young Americans" – 5:05
3. "Fame" (Edit) (Bowie, John Lennon, Carlos Alomar) – 3:25
4. "Golden Years" (Edit) – 3:20
5. "TVC 15" (Edit) – 3:28
6. "Sound and Vision" – 3:00
7. ""Heroes"" (Edit) (Bowie, Brian Eno) – 3:26
8. "Boys Keep Swinging" (Bowie, Eno) – 3:15

== Charts ==
Chart (1981)	Position
Austrian Albums (Ö3 Austria)	12
Dutch Albums (Album Top 100)	4
Swedish Albums (Sverigetopplistan)	25
UK Albums (OCC)	3
