= V-2 Schneider =

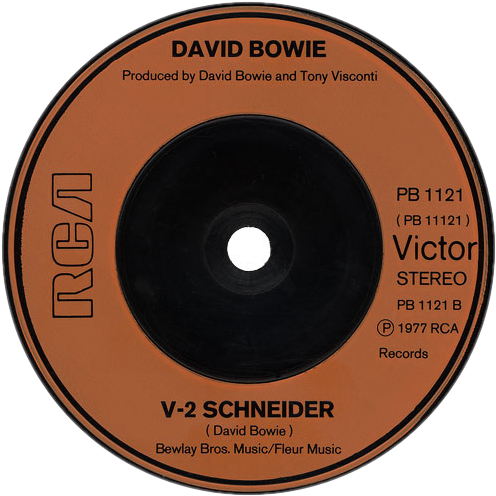

Single by David Bowie

from the album "Heroes"
- A-side: "'Heroes'"
- Released: 23 September 1977
- Recorded: July–August 1977
- Studio: Hansa Studio by the Wall (West Berlin)
- Genre: Art rock; electronic
- Length: 3:10
- Label: RCA
- Songwriter: David Bowie
- Producers: David Bowie; Tony Visconti

David Bowie singles chronology
"Be My Wife" (1977)	"'Heroes'" / "V-2 Schneider" (1977)	"Beauty and the Beast" (1978)

"V-2 Schneider" is a largely instrumental song written by David Bowie in 1977 for the album "Heroes", and released as the B-side of "'Heroes'". The song was not played on the subsequent Isolar II Tour and its first live rendition occurred in 1997, 20 years after it was recorded. Mojo magazine listed it as Bowie's 95th best track in 2015.

== Background ==
The song was a tribute to Florian Schneider, co-founder of the band Kraftwerk, whom Bowie acknowledged as a significant influence at the time. The title also referenced the V-2 rocket, the first ballistic missile (notable also is that schneiden is German for “to strike” or “to cut”), which had been developed for the German Army during World War II, and whose design (and engineers) played a key role in the American space program.

The only words sung are those in the title, initially distorted by phasing. Musically, the track is unusual for the off-beat saxophone work by Bowie, who kicked off his part on the wrong note, but continued regardless.

== Live versions ==
A live version recorded during the Earthling Tour at Paradiso, Amsterdam in June 1997, was released as the B-side of the single "Pallas Athena" in August 1997, under the name Tao Jones Index. This version also appeared on the bonus disc for the Digibook Expanded Edition of Earthling.

== Other releases ==
- It appeared on the compilation Chameleon (Australia and New Zealand 1979).
- It was featured in the film Christiane F. and its soundtrack.
- It was released as a picture disc in the RCA Life Time picture disc set.
- It was included on the Bowie instrumental album All Saints.

== Cover versions ==
- Philip Glass – "Heroes" Symphony (1996)
- Mandarins Drum and Bugle Corps – 2000 repertoire
- Shearwater – as part of a live performance of the entire Berlin Trilogy for WNYC (2018)

== Sources ==
- Buckley, David (2005) [1999]. Strange Fascination – David Bowie: The Definitive Story. London: Virgin Books. ISBN 978-0-75351-002-5.
- Doggett, Peter (2012). The Man Who Sold the World: David Bowie and the 1970s. New York: HarperCollins Publishers. ISBN 978-0-06-202466-4.
- O'Leary, Chris (2019). Ashes to Ashes: The Songs of David Bowie 1976–2016. London: Repeater Books. ISBN 978-1-91224-830-8.
