= Symphony No. 12 (Glass) =

2018 symphony composed by Philip Glass

- by Philip Glass
- The symphony's album cover
- Period: Contemporary
- Style: Postmodern, minimalist
- Form: Symphony
- Based on: Lodger
- Composed: 2018

Premiere
- Date: January 10, 2019
- Location: Walt Disney Hall, Los Angeles, California
- Conductor: John Adams
- Performers: Los Angeles Philharmonic, Angélique Kidjo

Symphony No. 12 (Lodger) is the twelfth symphony by the American composer Philip Glass. The work was commissioned by the Los Angeles Philharmonic and premiered January 10, 2019, with John Adams conducting the LA Phil at the Walt Disney Concert Hall in Los Angeles. The European premiere followed on May 9, 2019, with a performance by the London Contemporary Orchestra at Southbank Centre.

Based on David Bowie's 1979 album Lodger, it completes Glass's trilogy of symphonies based on Bowie's Berlin Trilogy of albums, which previously inspired Glass's first and fourth symphonies, based on Low and "Heroes", respectively. Glass had indicated his intent to write this third work as early as 1997, when he told the Los Angeles Times that he had discussed approaches to its composition with Bowie.

== Reviews ==
The premiere was greeted with positive reviews in the Los Angeles Times, with soloist Angélique Kidjo praised for "illuminating on every level" the lyrics of David Bowie.

The San Francisco Classical Voice was not so kind, calling the work "as overstuffed as a lumpy couch" and criticizing the choice of vocal soloist for the work.

The premiere in London at the Royal Festival Hall was positively reviewed by the Financial Times complimenting Angelique Kidjo's performance: "With a husky, Marlene Dietrich-style low end, she was a bracingly expressionist presence, reimagining Bowie’s surrealistic verses as Weimar cabaret. She rose impressively to the demanding role." Bachtrack gave a favorable review also: "Glass wrote the work with the formidable voice and presence of Kidjo in mind, and she gave a performance of deep presence and strength, her voice beginning in a purposeful, chromatic drone that followed Glass’ chromatic lines, but drawing the audience in a journey of gradual expansion and emotion as the symphony progressed. The music itself is lush and formidable, overlaid by the presence of the Royal Festival Hall’s imposing organ which acts as a forceful parent to the orchestra."

== Compositional technique ==
Instead of basing the symphony on Bowie's musical themes, Symphony No. 12 is based on the lyrics of David Bowie's Lodger and employs a larger orchestra (including an organ) and vocal line.

The work is in seven movements:

1. Fantastic Voyage
2. Move On
3. African Night Flight
4. Boys Keep Swinging
5. Yassassin
6. Repetition
7. Red Sails
