= Berlin Trilogy =

Trilogy of studio albums by David Bowie in the late 1970s

Berlin Trilogy

Low (1977)

"Heroes" (1977)

Lodger (1979)

The Berlin Trilogy consists of three studio albums by English musician David Bowie: Low, "Heroes" (both 1977) and Lodger (1979). Bowie recorded the albums in collaboration with English musician Brian Eno and American producer Tony Visconti. The trilogy originated following Bowie's move from Los Angeles to Europe with American singer Iggy Pop to rid themselves of worsening drug addiction. Influences included the German krautrock scene and the recent ambient releases of Eno.

Both Low and "Heroes" experiment with electronic and ambient music, with conventional tracks on side one and instrumental pieces on side two. Lodger features a wide variety of musical styles with more accessible songs throughout; both sides are split thematically by the lyrics. King Crimson guitarists Robert Fripp and Adrian Belew contributed lead guitar to "Heroes" and Lodger, respectively. During the period, Bowie also co-wrote and produced Iggy Pop's debut solo album The Idiot (1977) and follow-up Lust for Life (also 1977); the former features a sound similar to that which Bowie explored on the trilogy.

Bowie began referring to the three albums as a Berlin-centred trilogy during the promotion of Lodger, although "Heroes" was the only instalment recorded completely in the city; Low was recorded mostly in France, while Lodger was recorded in Switzerland and New York City. Though considered significant in artistic terms, the trilogy has proven less successful commercially. Bowie would later call the trilogy's music his "DNA". In July 1983, the American magazine High Fidelity published the earliest known use of the term "Berlin trilogy" to refer to a part of Bowie's discography.

The albums of the trilogy received mixed reviews on release but garnered massive acclaim over time and have proven highly influential. While Low provided a major influence on the post-punk genre, inspiring artists like Joy Division and Gary Numan, elements of Lodger have been identified as a precursor to an increased interest in world music. The American composer and pianist Philip Glass adapted the three albums into classical symphonies. They were remastered in 2017 as part of the A New Career in a New Town (1977–1982) box set.

== Background ==
I was in serious public decline, emotionally and socially. I think I was very much on course to be another rock casualty. In fact, I’m quite certain I wouldn't have survived the '70s if I'd carried on doing what I was doing. But I was lucky enough to know somewhere within me that I was really killing myself, and I had to do something drastic to pull myself out of that.

— David Bowie, 1996

In 1974, David Bowie developed a cocaine addiction. Over the following two years, his addiction worsened, affecting both his physical and mental state. He recorded both Young Americans (1975) and Station to Station (1976), and filmed The Man Who Fell to Earth (1976), while under the influence of the drug. He attributed his growing addiction to the city of Los Angeles, California, where he moved in the spring of 1975. His drug intake escalated so that decades later, he recalled almost nothing of the recording of Station to Station, saying, "I know it was in L.A. because I've read it was." Although he enjoyed commercial success during this period, particularly with the singles "Fame" and "Golden Years", he was ready to rid himself of the drug culture of Los Angeles and get sober.

After abandoning a proposed soundtrack album for The Man Who Fell to Earth, Bowie decided to move back to Europe. He began rehearsals for the Isolar tour to promote Station to Station in January 1976; the tour began on 2 February. While the tour was critically acclaimed, Bowie became a controversial figure during the tour. In his persona as the Thin White Duke, he made statements about Adolf Hitler and Nazi Germany that some interpreted as expressing sympathy for or even promoting fascism. He later blamed his erratic behaviour during this period on his addictions and precarious mental state, saying, "I was out of my mind, totally crazed." He later said: "It was a dangerous period for me. I was at the end of my tether physically and emotionally and had serious doubts about my sanity." At the conclusion of the Isolar tour on 18 May 1976, Bowie and his wife Angela moved to Switzerland.

== Development ==
=== Early influences ===
After completing Station to Station in December 1975, Bowie began work on a soundtrack for The Man Who Fell to Earth with Paul Buckmaster, his collaborator on Space Oddity (1969). Bowie was expected to be wholly responsible for the film's music but found that "when I'd finished five or six pieces, I was then told that if I would care to submit my music along with some other people's ... and I just said 'Shit, you're not getting any of it.' I was so furious, I'd put so much work into it." Station to Station co-producer Harry Maslin argued Bowie was "burned out" and could not complete the work. Bowie eventually collapsed, saying later, "There were pieces of me laying all over the floor." One instrumental composed for the soundtrack evolved into "Subterraneans", later properly recorded for Low; the remaining material was scrapped. When Bowie presented his material for the film to the director, Nicolas Roeg, Roeg decided it was not suitable and preferred a more folksy sound. The soundtrack's eventual composer John Phillips described Bowie's material as "haunting and beautiful". Six months after Bowie's proposal was rejected, he sent Roeg a copy of Low with a note stating: "This is what I wanted to do for the soundtrack. It would have been a wonderful score."

While on the Isolar tour in May 1976, Bowie met ex–Roxy Music keyboardist and conceptualist Brian Eno backstage at a London concert. Although the two had occasional meetups since 1973, they had yet to become friends. Since leaving Roxy Music, Eno released two ambient solo albums in 1975—Another Green World and Discreet Music; Bowie listened to the latter regularly during the American leg of the tour. Biographers Marc Spitz and Hugo Wilcken later recognised Another Green World in particular as a major influence on the sound Bowie aimed to create for Low; (Note: Another Green World features songs with recognisable pop structures along with instrumental ambient tracks that reflect atmosphere and texture, properties Bowie would exhibit for Low.) Bowie biographer Christopher Sandford also cites Eno's Taking Tiger Mountain (By Strategy) (1974) as an influence on Bowie. Individually, the two became infatuated with the German music scene, including the acts Tangerine Dream, Neu!, Kraftwerk and Harmonia. While Eno had worked with Harmonia both in-studio and on stage, Bowie exhibited a krautrock influence on Station to Station, particularly its title track. After the meetup, the two agreed to stay in touch.

=== The Idiot ===
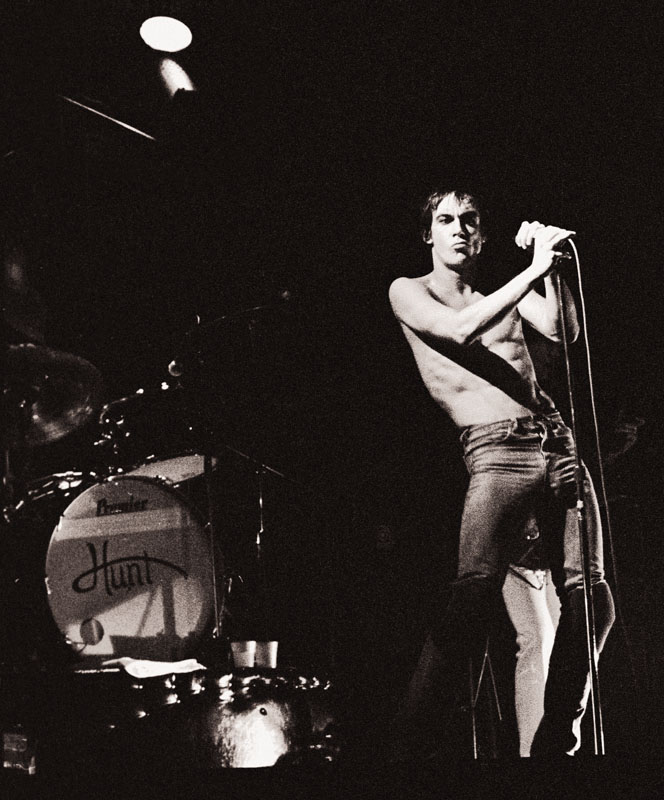
After moving to Europe, Bowie co-wrote and produced The Idiot, the debut solo album by Iggy Pop (pictured in 1977). Biographer Nicholas Pegg describes The Idiot as "a stepping stone between Station to Station and Low".

After moving to Switzerland, Bowie booked studio time later in the summer at the Château d'Hérouville in Hérouville, France, where he made plans to write and produce an album for his old friend, singer Iggy Pop. Pop, who was also suffering from drug addiction, was ready to get sober and accepted Bowie's invitation to accompany him on the Isolar tour, and then move to Europe with him. After they relocated to the Château, Bowie travelled back to Switzerland, where he spent the next few weeks writing and devising plans for his next album.

Bowie composed a majority of the music for The Idiot (1977), while Pop wrote most of the lyrics, often in response to the music Bowie was creating. During its recording, Bowie developed a new process, where the backing tracks were recorded first, followed by overdubs, with lyrics and vocals written and recorded last. He favoured this "three-phase" process, which he used for the rest of his career. Because The Idiot was recorded before Low, the album has been referred to as the unofficial beginning of Bowie's Berlin period, as its music featured a sound reminiscent of that which Bowie would explore in the Berlin Trilogy. Bowie and Tony Visconti co-mixed it at Hansa Studios in West Berlin.

Bowie became fascinated with Berlin, finding it a place of great escape. In love with the city, he and Pop decided to move there in a further attempt to kick their drug habits and escape the spotlight. Although The Idiot was completed by August 1976, Bowie wanted to be sure he had his own album in stores before its release. Château owner and The Idiot bassist Laurent Thibault opined that, "[Bowie] didn't want people to think he'd been inspired by Iggy's album, when in fact it was all the same thing."

Although reviewers consider The Idiot good in its own right, Pop's fans have criticised the album as unrepresentative of his repertoire and as evidence of his being "co-opted" by Bowie for his own ends. Bowie later admitted: "Poor [Iggy], in a way, became a guinea pig for what I wanted to do with sound. I didn't have the material at the time, and I didn't feel like writing at all. I felt much more like laying back and getting behind someone else's work, so that album was opportune, creatively." Biographer Chris O'Leary considers The Idiot a Bowie album just as much as a Pop one. Although the Berlin Trilogy is said to comprise Low, "Heroes", and Lodger, O'Leary argues the true Berlin Trilogy consists of The Idiot, Low, and "Heroes", with Lust for Life a "supplement" and Lodger an "epilogue".

== History ==
=== 1976: Low ===
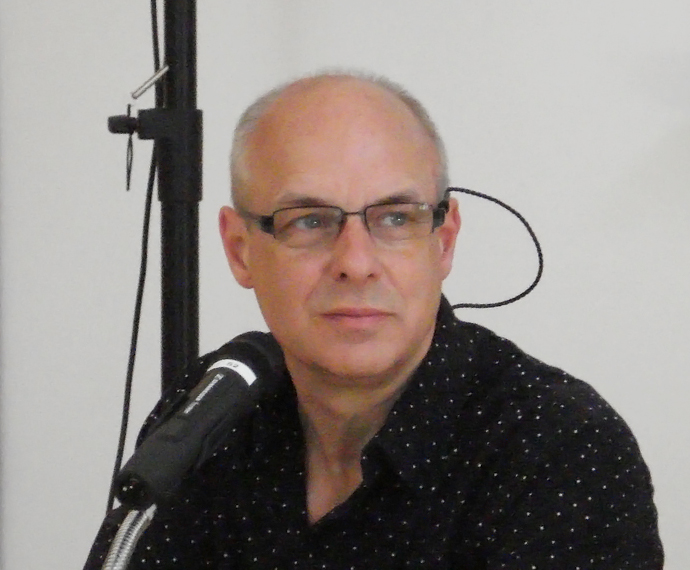
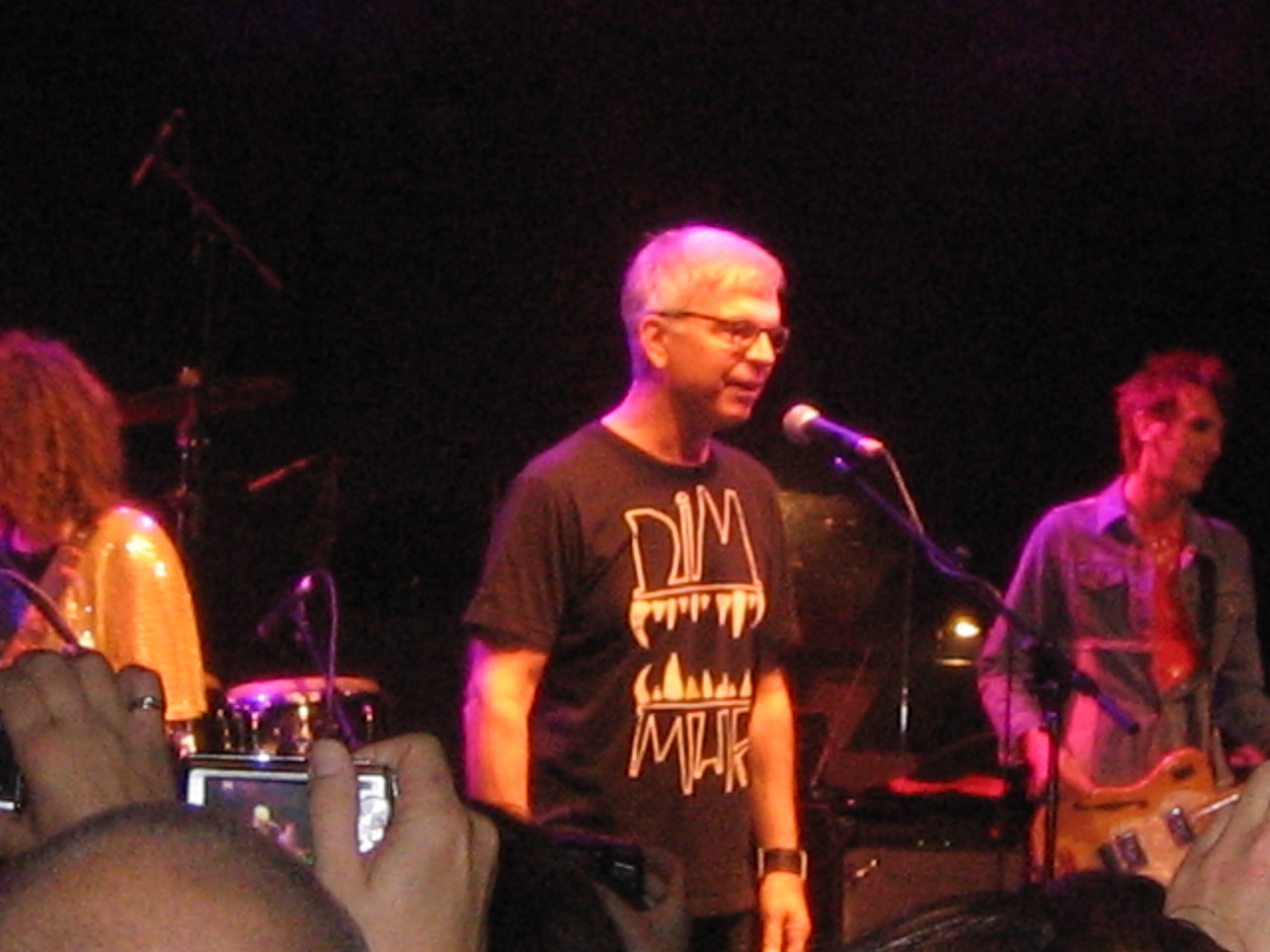
Brian Eno (left) and Tony Visconti (right) each contributed greatly to the unique production methods and sound of the Berlin Trilogy.

The first album in the trilogy was Low, most of which was recorded at the Château, with the sessions completing at Hansa in Berlin. At this point, Bowie was fully ready to move to Berlin but had already booked another month of studio time at the Château, so recording began there. Bowie and Visconti co-produced the album, with contributions from Eno. Visconti, who was absent for the recording of Station to Station because of conflicting schedules, was brought back to co-produce after mixing The Idiot. Despite being widely perceived as a co-producer, Eno was not. Visconti said: "Brian is a great musician, and was very integral to the making of [the Berlin Trilogy]. But he was not the producer." According to biographer Paul Trynka, Eno arrived late in the sessions, after all the backing tracks for side one were "essentially" finished.

Low's music delves into electronic, ambient, art rock and experimental rock. The tracks on Low emphasize tone and atmosphere, rather than guitar-based rock. German bands like Tangerine Dream, Neu! and Kraftwerk influence the music. Side one consists primarily of short, direct avant-pop song-fragments; side two comprises longer, mostly instrumental tracks. In 1977, Bowie said side one was about himself and his "prevailing moods" at the time while side two was about his musical observations living in Berlin. Low features a unique drum sound created by Visconti using an Eventide H910 Harmonizer. When Bowie asked him what it did, Visconti replied, "It fucks with the fabric of time." Visconti rigged the machine to Davis's snare drum and fed the results through his headphones.

Bowie's label, RCA Records, was shocked after hearing Low. Fearing the album would perform poorly commercially, RCA delayed its original planned release date in November 1976, releasing it instead in January 1977. Upon release, it received little to no promotion from either RCA or Bowie. Bowie felt it was his "least commercial" record, and rather than promote it opted to tour as Pop's keyboardist. Despite the lack of promotion, Low was a commercial success. The success of the single "Sound and Vision" helped Bowie to persuade RCA to release The Idiot, which they did in March 1977.

==== The Idiot tour and Lust for Life ====
Although RCA was hoping he would tour to support Low, Bowie toured with Pop as he promoted The Idiot. The tour began on 1 March 1977 and ended on 16 April. Bowie was adamant about not taking the spotlight away from Pop, often staying behind his keyboard and not addressing the audience. Despite this, some reviewers believed Bowie was still in charge. Likewise, during interviews, Pop was often asked more about Bowie than his own work. As a result, Pop took a more direct approach when making Lust for Life.

At the end of the tour, Bowie and Pop returned to the studio to record Pop's second solo album Lust for Life (1977). Bowie had less influence over Lust for Life. Instead, he let Pop compose his own arrangements for the tracks, resulting in a sound more reminiscent of Pop's earlier work. Recording took place at Hansa by the Wall in West Berlin and was completed in two and a half weeks, from May to June 1977, and released in August. Although Bowie had told interviewers he planned to collaborate on a third project with Pop in 1978, Lust for Life was their last official collaboration until the mid-1980s.

=== 1977: "Heroes" ===
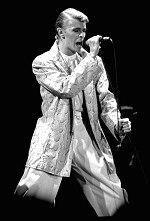
Bowie performing at Ekeberghallen during the Isolar II world tour, 1978

As the second release of the Berlin Trilogy, "Heroes" (1977) expands on the material found on Low. Like its predecessor, it delves into art rock and experimental rock, while continuing Bowie's work in the electronic and ambient genres. The songs emphasise tone and atmosphere rather than guitar-based rock. However, they have been described as more positive in both tone and atmosphere than the songs on Low. Visconti described the album as "a very positive version of Low". It follows the same structure as its predecessor, with side one featuring more conventional tracks and side two featuring mostly instrumental tracks.

"Heroes" was the only instalment of the Berlin Trilogy recorded entirely in Berlin. Most of the same personnel on Low returned to record, with the addition of Bowie on piano, and guitarist Robert Fripp, formerly of the band King Crimson, who Bowie recruited at Eno's suggestion. On his arrival at the studio, Fripp sat down and recorded lead guitar parts for tracks he had never heard before. He received little guidance from Bowie, who had yet to write lyrics or melodies. Fripp completed his guitar parts in three days. Bowie was in a much healthier state of mind during these sessions than during those for Low. He and Visconti frequently travelled around Berlin. While there, Bowie began exploring other art forms and visiting galleries in Geneva and the Brücke Museum, becoming in Sandford's words: "a prolific producer and collector of contemporary art ... Not only did he become a well-known patron of expressionist art, locked in Clos des Mésanges he began an intensive self-improvement course in classical music and literature, and started work on an autobiography."

Eno played a greater role on "Heroes" than he had on Low. He is credited as co-author on four of the ten songs, leading biographer Thomas Jerome Seabrook to call this album the "truer" collaboration. Eno acted as "assistant director" for Bowie, giving feedback to the musicians and suggesting new and unusual ways to approach the tracks. One way was using Eno's Oblique Strategies cards. According to O'Leary, these cards were "part-fortune cookie, part-Monopoly 'Chance' cards", intended to spark creative ideas. Bowie improvised lyrics while standing at the microphone, after seeing Pop do so for The Idiot.

"Heroes" was released in October 1977 in the wake of the punk rock movement. RCA marketed the album with the slogan, "There's Old Wave. There's New Wave. And there's David Bowie ...". Like Low, "Heroes" was commercially successful—more so in the UK than in the US. Bowie promoted "Heroes" extensively, conducting numerous interviews and performing on various television programmes, including Marc, Bing Crosby's Merrie Olde Christmas, and Top of the Pops.

==== 1978: Isolar II Tour ====
After releasing "Heroes", Bowie spent much of 1978 on the Isolar II world tour, bringing the music of the first two Berlin Trilogy albums to almost a million people during 70 concerts in 12 countries. By now he had broken his drug addiction; biographer David Buckley writes Isolar II was "Bowie's first tour for five years in which he had probably not anaesthetised himself with copious quantities of cocaine before taking the stage. ... Without the oblivion that drugs had brought, he was now in a healthy enough mental condition to want to make friends." He played tracks from both Low and "Heroes" on the tour. Recordings from the tour were included on the live album Stage, released later the same year, and again from a different venue in 2018 on Welcome to the Blackout. During this time he also portrayed the lead role in the David Hemmings film Just a Gigolo (1978), set in pre-World War II Berlin.

=== 1979: Lodger ===
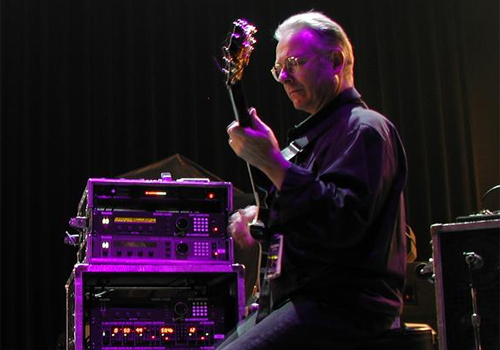
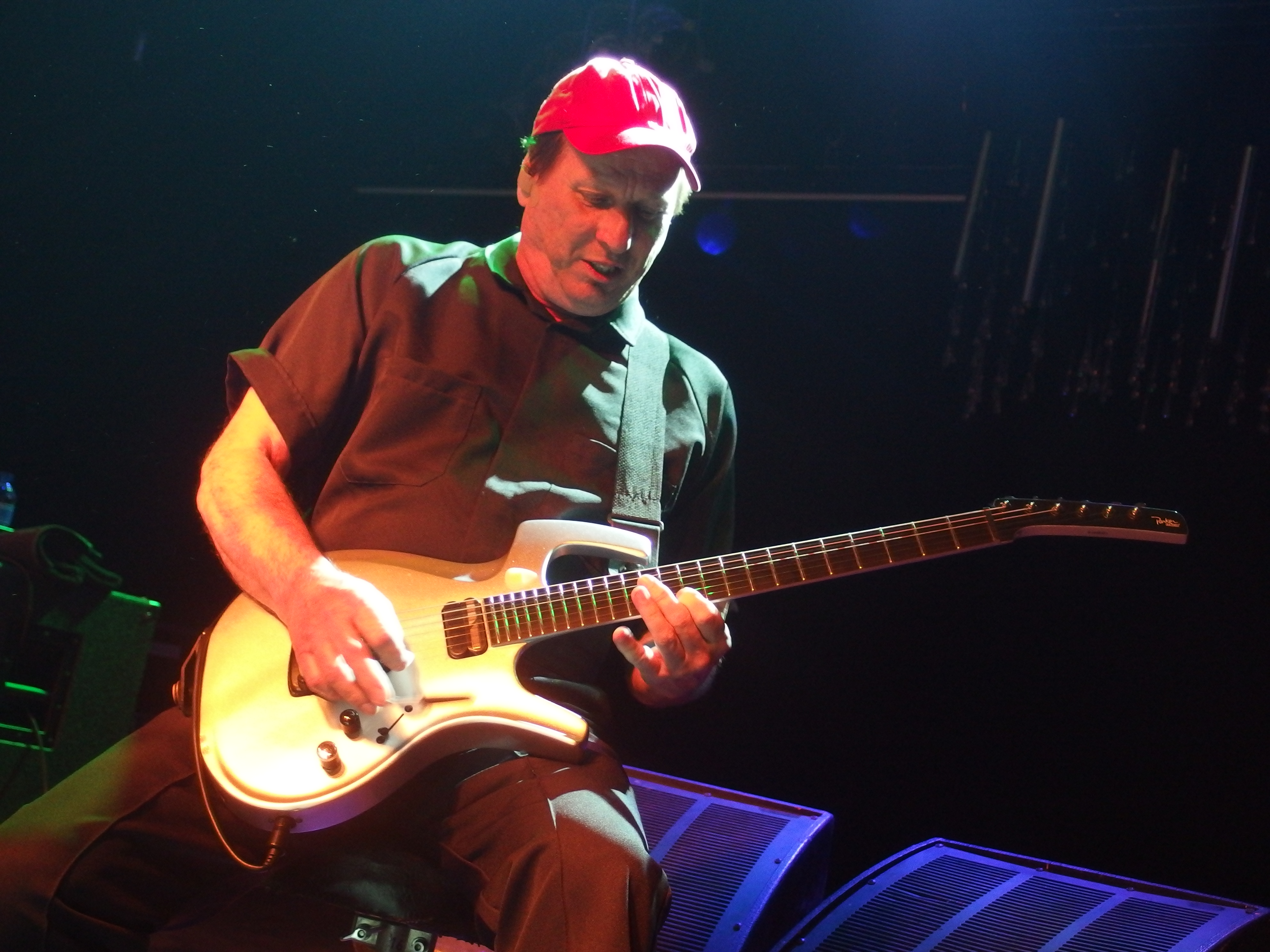
Guitarists Robert Fripp (left) and Adrian Belew (right) performed lead guitar on "Heroes" and Lodger, respectively.

It was around the time of Lodger (1979) that Bowie began framing his previous two albums as the beginning of a Berlin-centred trilogy, concluding with Lodger, largely as a marketing technique to support the unusual new album. Compared to its two predecessors, Lodger abandons the electronic and ambient styles and the song/instrumental split that defined the two earlier works, in favour of more conventional song structures. Instead, Lodger features a variety of musical styles, including new wave, Middle Eastern music, reggae and krautrock. Some of its musical textures, particularly on "African Night Flight", have been cited by The Quietus as presaging the popularity of world music.

Lodger was recorded at Mountain Studios in Montreux, Switzerland, with additional recording at the Record Plant in New York City. Many of the same musicians from the previous records returned for the Lodger sessions; a new addition was future King Crimson guitarist Adrian Belew. The sessions saw a greater emphasis on Eno's Oblique Strategies cards: "Boys Keep Swinging" entailed band members swapping instruments, "Move On" used the chords from Bowie's 1972 composition "All the Young Dudes" played backwards, and "Red Money" took backing tracks from The Idiot track "Sister Midnight". Unlike "Heroes", most of Lodger's lyrics were written late; they were unknown during the Mountain sessions. The lyrics have been interpreted as covering two major themes—travel on side one and critiques of Western civilisation on side two. Biographer Nicholas Pegg writes of side one's theme of travel, that the songs revive a "perennial motif" prevailing throughout the Berlin Trilogy, highlighting the line, "I've lived all over the world, I've left every place" from the Low track "Be My Wife", pointing out the journey is both metaphorical and geographical.

Lodger was released in May 1979, almost two years after "Heroes". Buckley notes that music videos and artists who were influenced by the music on Bowie's prior releases of the Berlin Trilogy, like Gary Numan, were becoming popular. Although Lodger performed well commercially, Numan out-performed Bowie commercially throughout the year. According to Buckley, Numan's fame led indirectly to Bowie taking a more pop-oriented direction for his next studio album, Scary Monsters (and Super Creeps) (1980), his first release after the Berlin Trilogy.

== Reception ==
The Berlin Trilogy initially received a mixed reception from music critics. Low divided critics; some, including Rolling Stone and NME were negative, while others, including Billboard and Sounds magazine, were positive. Initially, "Heroes" was the most well-received work of the trilogy, with NME and Melody Maker naming it their Album of the Year. Lodger was the least well-received, with Rolling Stone calling it one of Bowie's weakest releases to date. Although each album reached the top five on the UK charts, they proved less commercially successful than Bowie's earlier records. Buckley writes that with his next album, Scary Monsters, Bowie achieved "the perfect balance" of creativity and mainstream success.

Considered by Wilcken to be ahead of its time, Low is now recognised as one of Bowie's greatest and most innovative records. The Quietus argues that Bowie created the blueprint "reinvention" album with Low, a record from an artist at the peak of their popularity that confounded the listening public's expectations. Furthermore, it "challeng[ed] the idea of what an album could be, in its structure and in its ingredients", a feat not achieved again until the release of Radiohead's Kid A (2000). Billboard wrote that it was not until Kid A that rock and electronic met and moved forward in such a mature fashion again.

Although "Heroes" was the best-received work of the Berlin Trilogy on release, in subsequent decades critical and public opinion has typically shifted in favour of Low as the more ground-breaking record owing to its daring experimental achievements. Pegg writes the album is seen as an extension or refinement of its predecessor's achievements rather than a "definitive new work". It has, nonetheless, been regarded as one of Bowie's best and most influential works. Although regarded as the weakest of the Berlin Trilogy on release, Lodger has come to be considered one of Bowie's most underrated works.

Bowie later described the trilogy's music as his "DNA". Consequence of Sound characterised the trilogy as an "art rock trifecta". In 2017, Chris Gerard of PopMatters considered the trilogy, along with Scary Monsters, among "the most vital and influential [albums] by anyone in the rock era". He found the albums to be the reason Bowie is "so profoundly revered", further describing them as "uncompromising and untethered artistic expressions with no commercial considerations limiting...scope". He concluded by praising these albums' abilities to take the listener into new worlds, "offer[ing] full immersion into another universe of sound and vision". Three years later, Classic Rock History ranked the Berlin Trilogy as Bowie's seventh greatest work, calling the three albums a "fascinating chapter" in Bowie's life.

== Influence ==
Commentators regard the Berlin Trilogy as among the most innovative works of Bowie's career. When reviewing Bowie's 1995 album Outside, Barry Walters of Spin compared its sound to that of the Berlin Trilogy, which he considered forerunners in the development of industrial rock, synth-pop and "ambient trance". In Stylus Magazine, Alfred Soto also noted the influence of the trilogy, alongside Bowie's earlier Diamond Dogs (1974), on gothic rock, stating that the "sepulchral baritone" of the records "rumbled beneath the desiccated landscapes created by The Mission U.K., Fields of the Nephilim, Sisters of Mercy and, most famously, Bauhaus."

Both Low and The Idiot have been considered major influences on the post-punk genre. Stylus Magazine regards Low as a crucial influence on the post-rock genre, which came to prominence among underground musicians nearly two decades after its release. Commentators have cited Joy Division, an English post-punk band formed in the months between the releases of Low and The Idiot, as having been influenced by both albums. Joy Division themselves have acknowledged Low's influence on the band; their original name was "Warsaw", a reference to the Low track "Warszawa". The band's drummer, Stephen Morris, told Uncut magazine in 2001 that when they made their 1978 An Ideal for Living EP, the band asked the engineer to imitate Low's drum sound; they could not. Like Morris, many musicians, producers and engineers tried to imitate Low's drum sound. Visconti refused to explain how he did it, instead asking them how they thought it had been done. Commentators later recognised an array of artists who were influenced by Low, including the Human League, Cabaret Voltaire, Arcade Fire, Gary Numan, Devo, Ultravox, Orchestral Manoeuvres in the Dark, Magazine, Gang of Four and Wire. Robert Smith of the Cure and Trent Reznor of Nine Inch Nails have also acknowledged Low's influence on their respective records Seventeen Seconds (1980) and The Downward Spiral (1994).

Artists inspired by "Heroes" include Andy McCluskey of Orchestral Manoeuvres in the Dark, who referred to the "unconscious influence" of Bowie on his singing style, Vince Clarke, who called it a "rebellion inspiration", Ian Astbury of the Cult and Robyn Hitchcock. John Lennon and U2 have also acknowledged the album's influence when making their records Double Fantasy (1980) and Achtung Baby (1991), respectively. Scott Walker used "Heroes" as "the reference album" when making the Walker Brothers' Nite Flights (1978), according to engineer Steve Parker.

Lodger's use of world music has been cited by Trynka as influencing Talking Heads and Spandau Ballet, while Spitz views it as influential on Talking Heads' Remain in Light (1980) and Paul Simon's Graceland (1986). In the 1990s, Britpop bands Blur and Oasis used aspects of Lodger tracks in their own recordings, including the former's 1997 single "M.O.R." and the latter's 1996 single "Don't Look Back in Anger".

=== Philip Glass symphonies ===
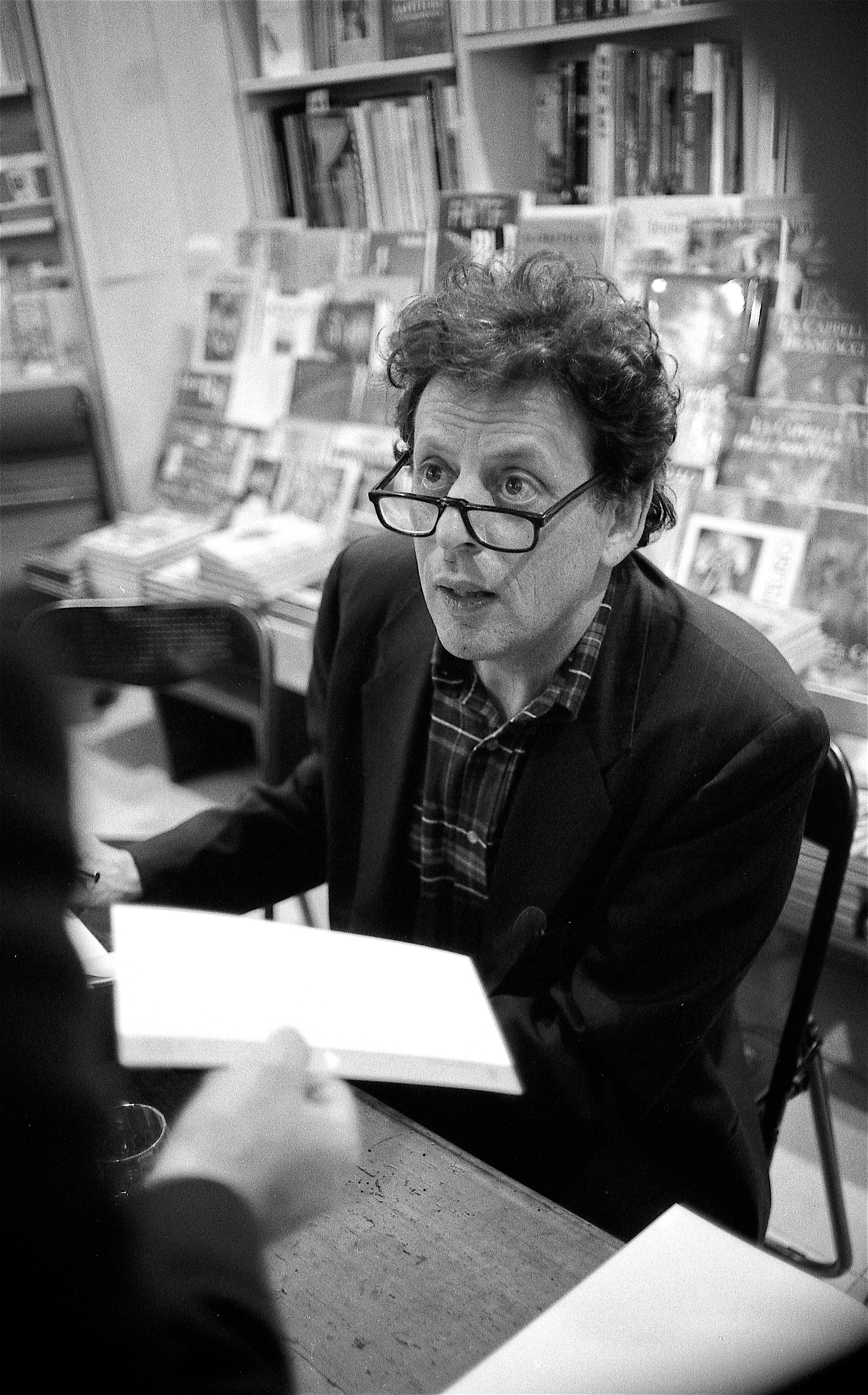
American composer Philip Glass (pictured in 1993) composed three different symphonies based on the Berlin Trilogy. The symphonies were released in 1992, 1997 and 2019.

In 1992, the American composer and pianist Philip Glass composed a classical suite based on Low, titled "Low" Symphony. It was his first symphony and consisted of three movements, each based on three Low tracks. The Brooklyn Philharmonic Orchestra recorded the work at Glass's Looking Glass Studios in New York and his Point Music label released it in 1993. Speaking about the album, Glass said: "They were doing what few other people were trying to do – which was to create an art within the realm of popular music. I listened to it constantly." On his decision to create a symphony based on the record, Glass said: "In the question of Bowie and Eno's original Low LP, to me there was no doubt that both talent and quality were evident there ... My generation was sick to death of academics telling us what was good and what wasn't." Glass used both original themes and themes from three of the record's instrumentals for the symphony. The "Low" Symphony acknowledges Eno's contributions on the original record. Portraits of Bowie, Eno and Glass appear on the album cover. Bowie was flattered by the symphony and gave it unanimous praise, as did Pegg.

In 1997, Glass adapted "Heroes" into a classical suite, titled "Heroes" Symphony. The piece is separated into six movements; each is named after tracks on "Heroes". Like its predecessor, Glass acknowledged Eno's contributions as equal to Bowie's on the original album and credited the movements to the two equally. American choreographer Twyla Tharp developed "Heroes" Symphony into a ballet. Both the ballet and Symphony were greeted with acclaim. Glass described Low and "Heroes" as "part of the new classics of our time".

Bowie and Glass remained in contact until 2003 and discussed making a third symphony, which never came to fruition. After Bowie's death in 2016, Glass said the two had talked about adapting Lodger for the third symphony, adding "the idea has not totally disappeared". In January 2018, Glass announced the completion of a symphony based on Lodger. The work is Glass's 12th Symphony; it premiered in Los Angeles in January 2019. Like Glass's other adaptations, the "Lodger" Symphony is separated into seven movements, each named after tracks on Lodger. The symphony marked the completion of his trilogy of works based on the Berlin Trilogy.

== Later releases ==
The Berlin Trilogy, along with the live album Stage and Scary Monsters, was remastered in 2017 for Parlophone's A New Career in a New Town (1977–1982) box set. Named after the Low track of the same name, it was released in CD, vinyl, and digital formats, as part of this compilation and then separately the following year. The box set also includes a new remix of Lodger by Visconti, which was approved by Bowie before his death in 2016.

Both The Idiot and Lust for Life were expanded and remastered in 2020 for the seven-disc deluxe box set The Bowie Years. The set includes remastered versions of both albums along with outtakes, alternate mixes, and a 40-page booklet. The two original albums were also re-released individually, each paired with an additional album of live material to create separate stand-alone two-disc deluxe editions.

== See also ==
- Christiane F. (soundtrack compilation of songs from the Berlin Trilogy and Station to Station)

== Bibliography ==
- Ambrose, Joe (2004). Gimme Danger: The Story of Iggy Pop. London: Omnibus Press. ISBN 978-1-84449-328-9.
- Buckley, David (2005) [1999]. Strange Fascination – David Bowie: The Definitive Story. London: Virgin. ISBN 978-0-7535-1002-5.
- Carr, Roy; Murray, Charles Shaar (1981). Bowie: An Illustrated Record. New York: Avon. ISBN 0-380-77966-8.
- Doggett, Peter (2012). The Man Who Sold the World: David Bowie and the 1970s. New York City: HarperCollins Publishers. ISBN 978-0-06-202466-4.
- O'Leary, Chris (2019). Ashes to Ashes: The Songs of David Bowie 1976–2016. London: Repeater. ISBN 978-1-912248-30-8.
- Pegg, Nicholas (2016). The Complete David Bowie (Revised and Updated ed.). London: Titan Books. ISBN 978-1-78565-365-0.
- Perone, James E. (2007). The Words and Music of David Bowie. Westport, Connecticut: Greenwood Publishing Group. ISBN 978-0-275-99245-3.
- Sandford, Christopher (1997) [1996]. Bowie: Loving the Alien. London: Time Warner. ISBN 0-306-80854-4.
- Seabrook, Thomas Jerome (2008). Bowie in Berlin: A New Career in a New Town. London: Jawbone Press. ISBN 978-1-906002-08-4.
- Spitz, Marc (2009). Bowie: A Biography. New York City: Crown Publishing Group. ISBN 978-0-307-71699-6.
- Trynka, Paul (2011). David Bowie – Starman: The Definitive Biography. New York City: Little, Brown and Company. ISBN 978-0-316-03225-4.
- West, Mike (1984). Joy Division. Todmorden: Babylon. ISBN 0-907188-21-4.
- Wilcken, Hugo (2005). David Bowie's Low (33 1/3). New York City: Continuum. ISBN 978-0-8264-1684-1.
