= Symphony No. 1 (Glass) =

1992 symphony composed by Philip Glass

- Low
- by Philip Glass from Low composed by David Bowie and Brian Eno
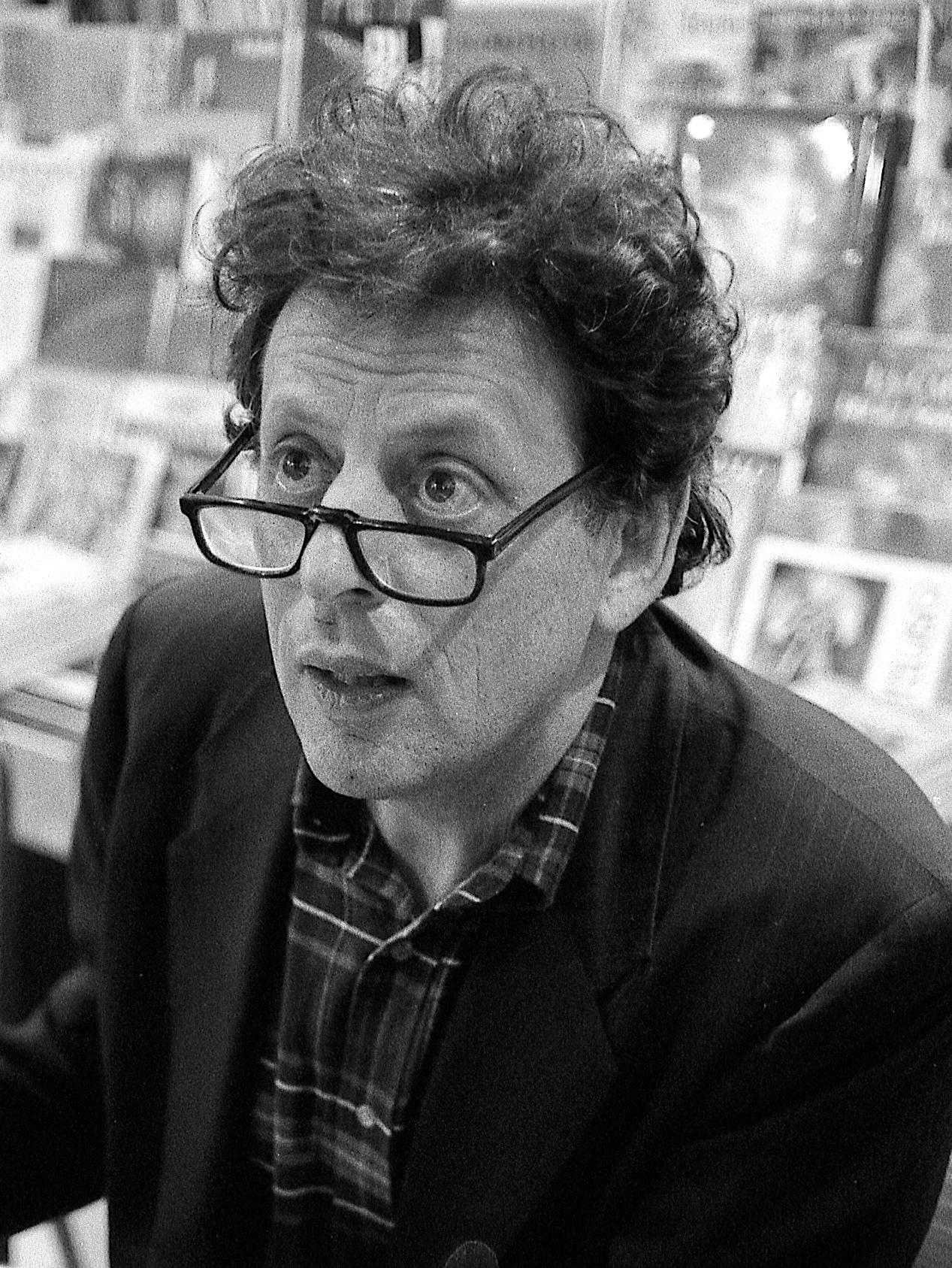
- Glass in 1993
- Other name: "Low" Symphony
- Style: Postmodern, minimalist
- Form: Symphony
- Composed: 1992
- Publisher: Dunvagen Music Publishers
- Duration: 42 minutes

Premiere
- Date: 30 August 1992
- Location: Munich, Germany
- Conductor: Dennis Russell Davies
- Performers: Deutsche Kammerphilharmonie

Symphony No. 1 (Low) is a symphony by Philip Glass based on David Bowie's 1977 album Low.

In 1996, Glass based another symphony on a David Bowie album, namely "Heroes", and in 2018 he based his 12th Symphony on Bowie's album Lodger, completing his trilogy of symphonies based on Bowie's Berlin Triptych.

== The symphony ==
The symphony was composed in 1992 and scored for full orchestra with 2 flutes, piccolo, 2 oboes, 2 clarinets, E♭ clarinet, bass clarinet, 2 bassoons, 4 horns, 3 trumpets, 3 trombones, tuba, percussion, harp, piano, and strings (including 8 first violins, 6 second violins, 4 violas, 4 cellos and 2 double basses).

The symphony has three movements:

1. "Subterraneans"
2. "Some Are"
3. "Warszawa"

"Some Are", the David Bowie song on which the second movement was based, was not included on the original release of Low, but was recorded around the Low recording sessions. The song was later released on the Rykodisc reissue of the album in 1991, as well as the 2008 David Bowie compilation "iSelect".

== Recordings ==
The first recording of this work was released in 1993 under the title Low Symphony. It was performed by the Brooklyn Philharmonic orchestra under the batons of Dennis Russell Davies, principal conductor, and Karen Kamensek, assistant conductor. Philip Glass allowed ideas of Bowie and Brian Eno, who worked together on Low, to influence how he worked on the music.

1. "Subterraneans" – 15:07
2. "Some Are" – 11:17
3. "Warszawa" – 15:57

== See also ==
- Symphony No. 4 ("Heroes")
- Symphony No. 12 (Lodger)
