= Christiane F. (soundtrack) =

1981 soundtrack album by David Bowie

Christiane F. – Wir Kinder vom Bahnhof Zoo: Original Soundtrack

Soundtrack album to the film Christiane F., Wir Kinder vom Bahnhof Zoo by David Bowie
- Released: April 1981
- Recorded: 1975–1979
- Genres: Rock, art rock
- Length: 41:38 (LP version); 41:50 (CD version)
- Label: RCA
- Producers: David Bowie; Harry Maslin; Tony Visconti

David Bowie chronology
The Best of Bowie (1980)	Christiane F. – Wir Kinder vom Bahnhof Zoo: Original Soundtrack (1981)	Changestwobowie (1981)

Professional ratings
Review scores
Source	Rating
Allmusic	4/5 stars

Christiane F. – Wir Kinder vom Bahnhof Zoo is a soundtrack album by David Bowie, released on LP in 1981 through RCA Records (and re-issued on CD through EMI in 2001), for the film about Christiane F. The German title of the film, Wir Kinder vom Bahnhof Zoo, means "We children of Zoo Station", referring to the railway station in Berlin, Germany.

== Track listing ==
All music composed by David Bowie except where noted.

No.	Title	Writer(s)	Original release	Length
1.	"V-2 Schneider"		"Heroes"	3:09
2.	"TVC 15" (Single Edit Version)		Station to Station	3:29
3.	"Heroes/Helden"	Bowie; Brian Eno; Antonia Maaß (German lyrics)	"Heroes"	6:01
4.	"Boys Keep Swinging"	Bowie; Eno	Lodger	3:16
5.	"Sense of Doubt"		"Heroes"	3:56
6.	"Station to Station" (Live)		Stage	8:42
7.	"Look Back in Anger"	Bowie; Eno	Lodger	3:06
8.	"Stay" (US Single Version)		Station to Station	3:20
9.	"Warszawa"	Bowie; Eno	Low	6:18

== Historical note ==
Although the entire soundtrack (save for "TVC 15" and "Stay") is made up of songs from Bowie's Berlin years (1977–1979), the story of Christiane F. plays in the early stages of that time (1976–1977); e.g. Christiane F. visited the concert of the Isolar – 1976 Tour in Berlin, which was opened by the song "Station to Station". The live version included in the film and soundtrack is taken from the album Stage, recorded on the 1978 Isolar II Tour.

== Charts ==
=== Weekly charts ===
Chart (1981–1982)	Peak position
Austrian Albums (Ö3 Austria)	3
German Albums (Offizielle Top 100)	5
Scottish Albums (Official Charts)	85
UK Soundtrack Albums (Official Charts)	6
US Billboard 200	135

=== Year-end charts ===
Chart (1981)	Position
Austrian Albums (Ö3 Austria)	18
German Albums (Offizielle Top 100)	29
