= David Bowie Narrates Prokofiev's Peter and the Wolf =

- 1978 original release

Studio album by the Philadelphia Orchestra with David Bowie
- Released: 2 May 1978
- Recorded: October 1975 (music); December 1977 (narration)
- Venues: Scottish Rite Temple, Philadelphia (music)
- Studios: RCA, New York City (narration)
- Genres: Orchestral; classical
- Length: 44:18
- Label: RCA Red Seal
- Producer: Jay David Saks

David Bowie chronology
"Heroes" (1977)	David Bowie Narrates Prokofiev's Peter and the Wolf (1978)	Stage (1978)

Alternative cover
- 1992 US CD reissue cover

David Bowie Narrates Prokofiev's Peter and the Wolf is a classical music album originally released by RCA Red Seal on 2 May 1978. Produced by Jay David Saks, the first side contains a performance of Sergei Prokofiev's Peter and the Wolf, with narration by the English musician David Bowie, who contributed to the project for his young son. The second side contains a music-only recording of Benjamin Britten's The Young Person's Guide to the Orchestra; both recordings were performed by the Philadelphia Orchestra conducted by Eugene Ormandy.

Upon release, the album reached number 136 on the US Billboard Top LPs & Tape chart and was Grammy-nominated in 1979. The recording has received positive reviews from critics and writers, with Bowie's appearance garnering praise as "charming" and engaging. It has since been reissued on compact disc with different artworks and additional recordings, including of Pyotr Ilyich Tchaikovsky's The Nutcracker Suite and Camille Saint-Saëns's The Carnival of the Animals.

== Overview ==
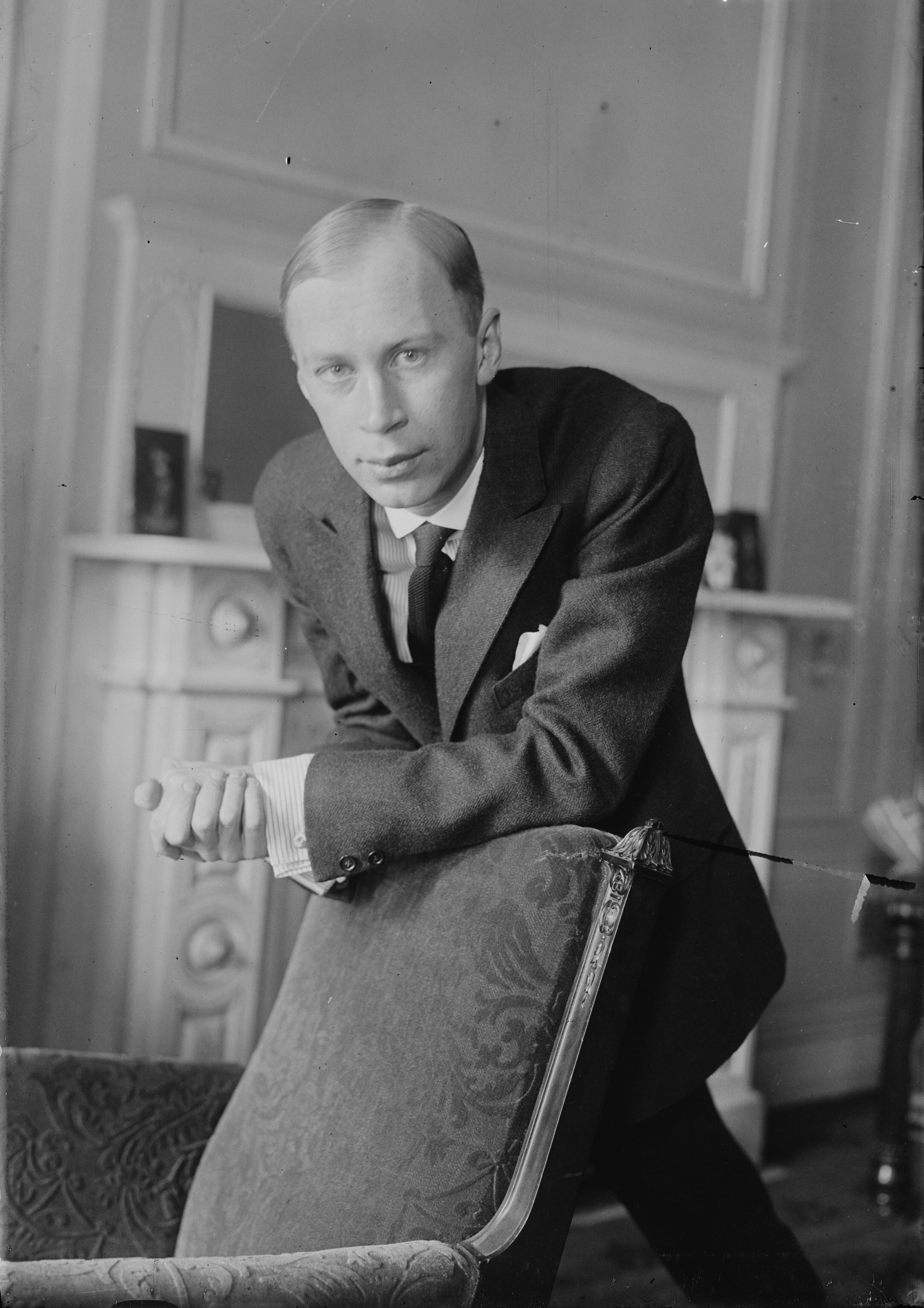
Composer Sergei Prokofiev (pictured c. 1918)

The Russian composer Sergei Prokofiev composed Peter and the Wolf with the intention of introducing younger children to orchestral music. The composition tells the story of a boy named Peter who travels outside his grandfather's garden in hopes of finding a big bad wolf. Each animal, including a duck, a cat and a bird, is represented by a different musical instrument, with a clarinet representing the cat and a trio of French horns representing the wolf. The composition originally premiered in Moscow in 1936 to lukewarm reception and remained relatively obscure in the western world until Walt Disney adapted it into an animated short film in 1946. Since Prokofiev's death in 1953, Peter and the Wolf has been regarded as one of his greatest pieces.

There have reportedly been over 400 recordings of Peter and the Wolf since its premiere. The composer Leonard Bernstein had narrated a version of Peter and the Wolf for Columbia Records in 1960, while the actor Sean Connery narrated another in 1971 that was performed by the London Royal Philharmonic Orchestra. For their version, RCA Records initially wanted the actors Alec Guinness and Peter Ustinov for narration, but both turned the project down, leading the label to hire David Bowie. Bowie contributed to the project as a gift for his then seven-year-old son Duncan. Bowie's then-collaborator Brian Eno had appeared on a 1975 recording narrated by Vivian Stanshall.

The project was produced and managed by Jay David Saks. The music was performed by the Philadelphia Orchestra, conducted by Eugene Ormandy, and recorded at the Scottish Rite Temple in Philadelphia on 8 October 1975. The orchestra consisted of a flute, oboe, clarinet, bassoon, three horns, trumpet, trombone, timpani, drum, two violins, viola, cello and double bass. Bowie recorded his narration at RCA Studio B in New York City in December 1977, after completing promotional appearances for his album "Heroes". Ormandy did not know who Bowie was and, upon learning he was a rock star, was skeptical of his involvement. Bowie and Ormandy never met, but after hearing the final product, Ormandy enjoyed his performance.

== Release history ==
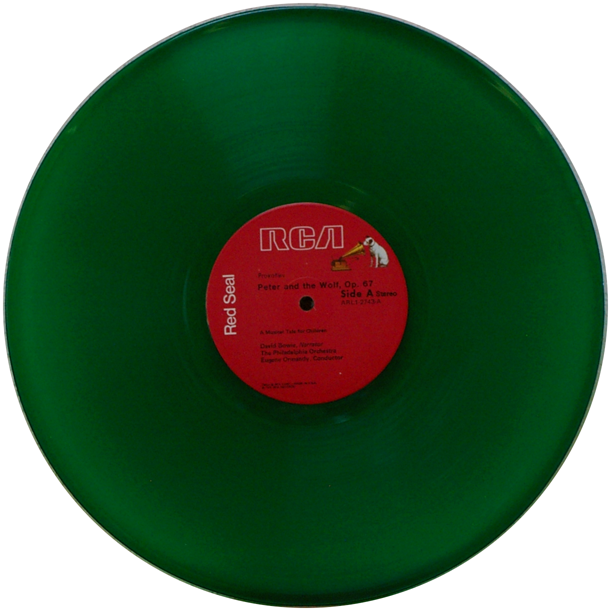
The original 1978 US green pressing of the LP

David Bowie Narrates Prokofiev's Peter and the Wolf was released on 2 May 1978 on the RCA Red Seal label. The Bowie-narrated Peter and the Wolf appeared on side A, and a music-only recording of the English composer Benjamin Britten's Young Person's Guide to the Orchestra (1945) appeared on side B, recorded by the Philadelphia Orchestra in late March 1974. Another musical drama, it uses symphonic orchestration to guide the story. Promotional material for the LP used the tagline: "What happens when a world-famous maestro teams up with a pop-rock dynamo?"

The album peaked at number 136 on the US Billboard Top LPs & Tape chart on 9 June and remained on the chart for eight weeks. At the 21st Annual Grammy Awards in 1979, Peter and the Wolf was nominated for Best Recording for Children, losing the award to The Muppet Show, the first soundtrack album to the television show of the same name.

The original 1978 US LP was pressed on green vinyl and included liner notes written by Mary Campbell. The album was also issued on 8-track and was later reissued on Compact disc and MP3.

Peter and the Wolf has been reissued several times on CD with varying extra tracks and alternate album artwork; the original 1985 CD issue featured the same tracks and cover art as the 1978 LP. The 1992 US CD release depicted a wolf wearing a mask of Bowie's face. This release also included an additional recording of Pyotr Ilyich Tchaikovsky's The Nutcracker Suite again, performed by the Philadelphia Orchestra, conducted by Ormandy. The 1994 reissue replaced the Nutcracker Suite with an Ormandy/Philadelphia Orchestra recording of Camille Saint-Saëns's The Carnival of the Animals. Another reissue of the original LP by RCA/Music On Vinyl followed on 23 October 2014.

== Reception ==
Professional ratings
Review scores
Source	Rating
AllMusic	3.5/5 stars

Peter and the Wolf has received positive reviews from music critics. Reviewers described Bowie's narration as "charming", "splendid" and "engaging". On release, Rolling Stone's Stephen Demorest felt Bowie had found "his most charming guise since Hunky Dory". In later decades, author Thomas Jerome Seabrook highlighted Bowie's "wide-eyed [and] enthusiastic delivery", while Peter Dobrin of The Philadelphia Inquirer praised Bowie's use of different voices for the characters, saying: "Even in 1978 and even in a children's recording, Bowie was imploring his listeners to think differently about the power of ambiguity." Chris O'Leary, however, found Bowie's voice to be too low in the mix. The music from the Philadelphia Orchestra was also positively received.

Other critics praised the project as a whole, with Jon Savage of Sounds magazine calling the LP a "perfect" introductory album to classical music for young children, or "if you're a 'child of all ages'." A review published in the Reno Gazette-Journal called the project "surprisingly refreshing" and declared:

All in all, Peter and the Wolf has something for everyone. For David Bowie fans, it is another successful demonstration of his openness to new directions. For lovers of the symphony, it is a selection of light-hearted compositions played by one of the world's foremost orchestras. And for children, it opens the door to a fantasy world of captivating music.

In a review for AllMusic, Joe Viglione called the LP a "remarkable and well-crafted project". Paul Howlett of The Guardian felt the project "sits quite neatly" in Bowie's discography. In his book The Complete David Bowie, Nicholas Pegg writes: "While not to be compared with John Gielgud's definitive recording, Bowie's narration has genuine charm. This is an accomplished piece of work and a fascinating curio from a period in which his other unlikely collaborations embraced figures as diverse as Marc Bolan, Bing Crosby and Marlene Dietrich."

== Track listing ==
Track lengths were not listed on the original 1978 LP. The below lengths are from the 1992 US release.

Side one

1. Peter and the Wolf, Op. 67 (Sergei Prokofiev) – 27:08

Side two

1. Young Person's Guide to the Orchestra, Op. 34 (Benjamin Britten) – 17:09

1992 US release

1. The Nutcracker Suite (Pyotr Ilyich Tchaikovsky) – 23:57

== Personnel ==
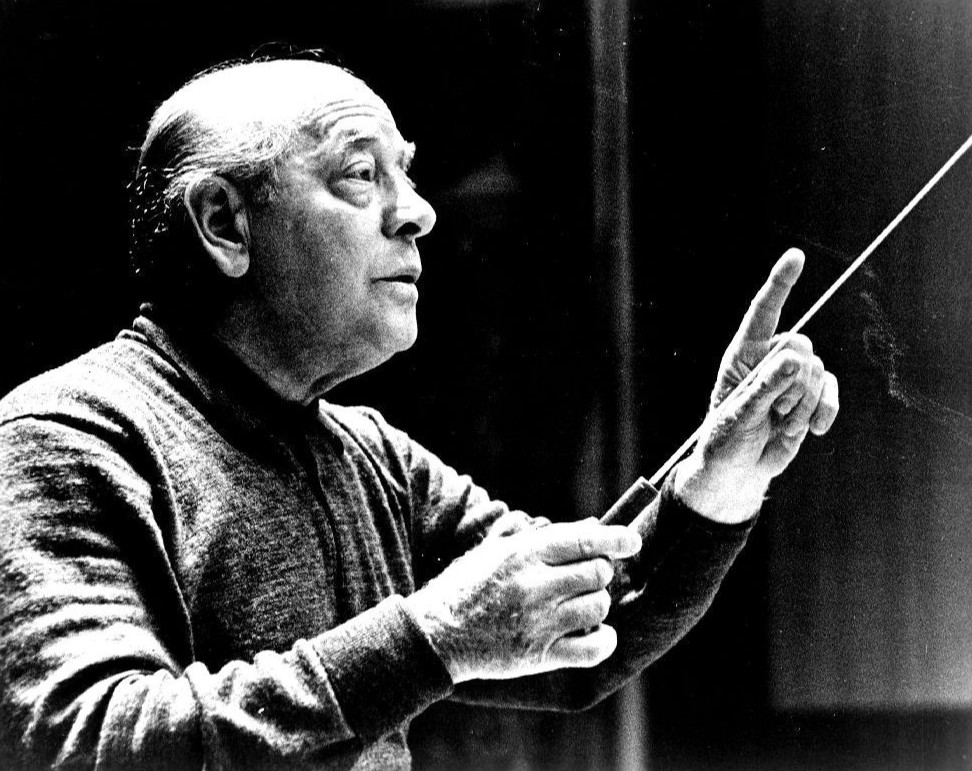
Conductor Eugene Ormandy in 1966.

According to Chris O'Leary:

- David Bowie – narrator (side A)
- Philadelphia Orchestra – all instruments
- Eugene Ormandy – conductor

Production

- Jay David Saks / Max Wilcox – producer
- Paul Goodman – engineer
- J.J. Stelmach – art direction
- Mary Campbell – liner notes
- Tom Kelley – cover photo

== Charts ==
Chart performance for Peter and the Wolf
Chart (1978)	Peak position
US Billboard Top LPs & Tape	136
