= "Heroes" (album) =

1977 studio album by David Bowie

Studio album by David Bowie
- Released: 14 October 1977
- Recorded: July–August 1977
- Studio: Hansa (West Berlin)
- Genres: Art rock; experimental rock; electronic; ambient
- Length: 40:19
- Label: RCA Victor
- Producers: David Bowie; Tony Visconti

David Bowie chronology
Low (1977)	"Heroes" (1977)	David Bowie Narrates Prokofiev's Peter and the Wolf (1978)

Singles from "Heroes"
- 1. "'Heroes'" / "V-2 Schneider" Released: 23 September 1977; 2. "Beauty and the Beast" / "Sense of Doubt" Released: 6 January 1978

"Heroes" (Note: The quotation marks are part of the title.) is the twelfth studio album by the English musician David Bowie, released on 14 October 1977 through RCA Records. Recorded in collaboration with the musician Brian Eno and the producer Tony Visconti, it was the second release of his Berlin Trilogy, following Low, released in January the same year, and the only one wholly recorded in Berlin. Sessions took place in mid-1977 after Bowie completed work on Iggy Pop's second solo album Lust for Life. Much of the same personnel from Low returned for "Heroes", augmented by guitarist Robert Fripp.

The majority of the tracks were composed on the spot in the studio, the lyrics not being written until Bowie stood in front of the microphone. The music builds upon its predecessor's electronic and ambient approaches, albeit with more positive tones, atmospheres and passionate performances. The album also follows the same structure as its predecessor, side one featuring more conventional rock tracks and side two featuring mostly instrumental tracks.

The cover photo, like Iggy Pop's The Idiot, is a nod to the painting Roquairol by the German artist Erich Heckel. Upon release, "Heroes" was a commercial success, peaking at number 3 in the UK and number 35 in the US. It was the best-received work of the Berlin Trilogy on release; NME and Melody Maker each named it their respective album of the year. Bowie promoted the album extensively with television appearances and interviews. He supported Low and "Heroes" on the Isolar II world tour throughout 1978, live performances from which appear on multiple live albums.

"Heroes" has received enduring praise, particularly recognised for Fripp's contributions and the album's place within Bowie's longterm artistic development. Though critical opinion has viewed Low as the more groundbreaking record, "Heroes" is regarded as one of Bowie's best, most influential works. The title track, initially unsuccessful as a single, has remained one of his best-known and most-acclaimed songs. An altered and obscured version of the cover artwork was later used for the cover of The Next Day (2013). "Heroes" has been reissued several times and was remastered in 2017 as part of the box set A New Career in a New Town (1977–1982).

== Background ==
In the second half of 1976, David Bowie and his friend Iggy Pop relocated to the Château d'Hérouville in Hérouville, France, to escape from the drug culture of Los Angeles. There, Bowie produced Pop's debut studio album The Idiot (1977) and recorded his own, Low, in collaboration with the musician Brian Eno and the producer Tony Visconti; the album was the first in what came to be known as Bowie's Berlin Trilogy.

Low was released in January 1977, receiving little to no promotion from both RCA Records and Bowie himself, who instead opted to tour as Pop's keyboardist. After the tour's completion, Bowie and Pop returned to Hansa Tonstudio in West Berlin, where they recorded Pop's next solo album Lust for Life from May to June 1977. By the time he finished Lust for Life, Bowie was ready to begin work on his next record. He and Eno spent a few weeks devising concepts and ideas for the new album before they were joined by Visconti, who was busy with other commitments.

== Production ==
=== Studio and personnel ===
For the album, Bowie, Visconti and Eno regrouped at Hansa Studio 2 in West Berlin. Although the album was the second installment of Bowie's Berlin Trilogy, it was the only one recorded entirely in Berlin. The studio was a former concert hall converted into a recording studio that had been used by Gestapo officers during World War II as a ballroom. The studio was located about 500 yards from the Berlin Wall, leading Bowie to describe it as "the hall by the wall". Describing how the location of the studio affected the creative process, Visconti recalled: "Every afternoon I'd sit down at [a] desk and see three Russian Red Guards looking at us with binoculars, with their Sten guns over their shoulders, and the barbed wire, and I knew that there were mines buried in that wall, and that atmosphere was so provocative and so stimulating and so frightening that the band played with so much energy". Despite the dark atmosphere, Visconti particularly had an exciting time creating the album, saying, "It was one of my last great adventures in making albums."

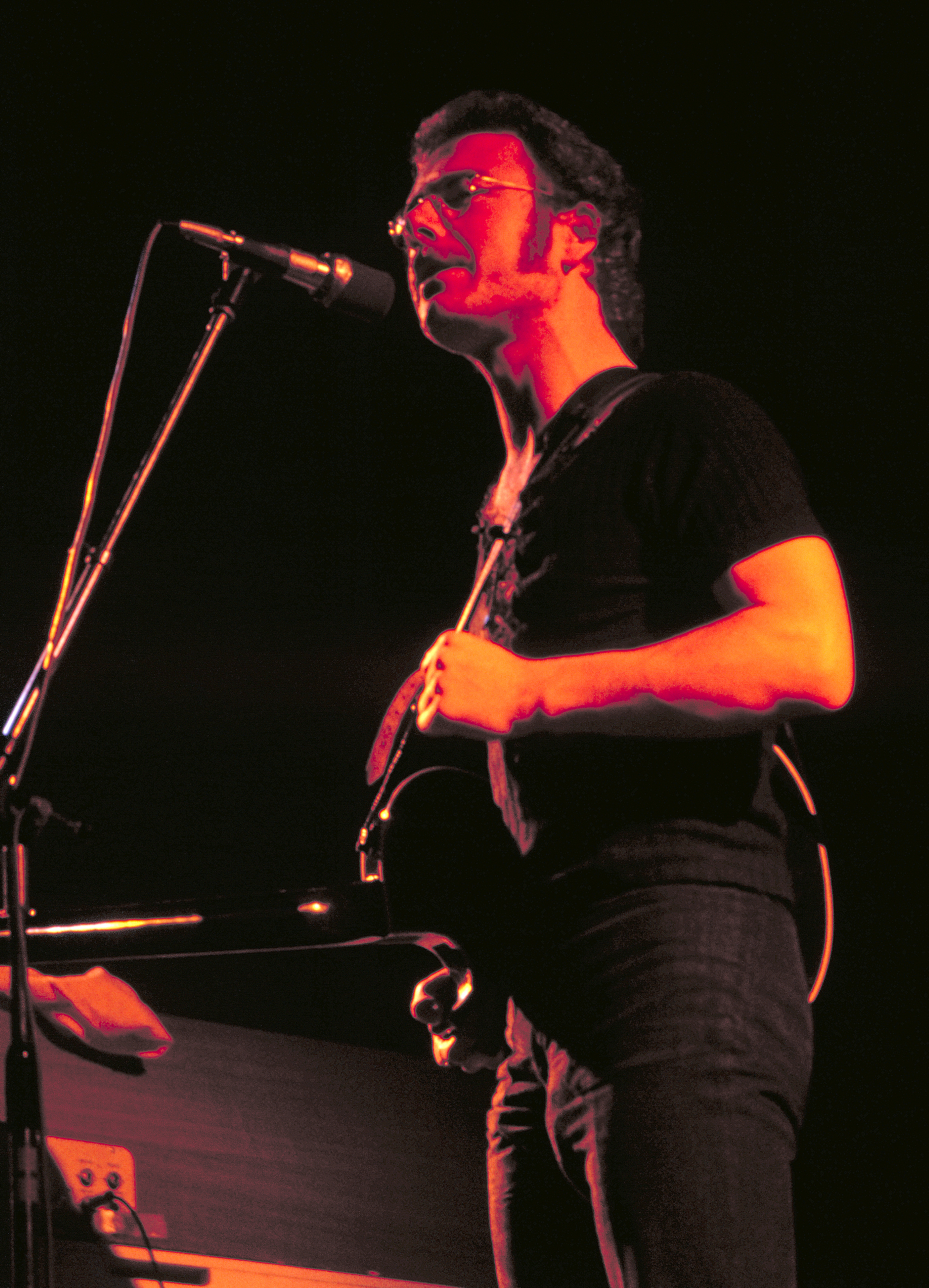
The guitar playing of Robert Fripp (pictured in 1974) greatly influenced the songs on "Heroes".

Most of the album was recorded with the same personnel as its predecessor Low, with Carlos Alomar, George Murray and Dennis Davis as the core band. Bowie played piano, having gotten significantly more experience playing the instrument during his time with Pop. An addition to the lineup was the guitarist Robert Fripp, formerly of the band King Crimson, who was recruited at Eno's suggestion. The guitarist recalled: "I got a phone call [from Brian Eno] when I was living in New York in July 1977. He said that he and David were recording in Berlin and passed me over. David said, 'Would you be interested in playing some hairy rock 'n' roll guitar?' I said, 'Well, I haven't really played for three years – but, if you're prepared to take a risk, so will I.' Shortly afterward, a first-class ticket on Lufthansa arrived." Upon his arrival to the studio, Fripp sat down and recorded lead guitar parts for tracks he had never heard before. He also received little guidance from Bowie, who had yet to write lyrics or melodies. Fripp completed all his guitar parts in three days. Fripp's playing received significant praise from Visconti and Eno, who were impressed with Fripp's ability to play for songs he had never heard before with such "virtuosity". According to the biographer Nicholas Pegg, Fripp was not Bowie's first choice. Michael Rother of the German band Neu! had originally been approached to contribute, but shortly before the sessions began, he was contacted by an unknown person and informed that Bowie had changed his mind, although later interviews with Bowie suggested otherwise.

While producing other Bowie records, Visconti found that new ideas were flowing constantly, so they were sometimes forgotten. To counteract this, he kept a two-track tape running at all times. Murray recalled: "Tony had the insight to see what was happening in rehearsals so he just switched on the tape machines and let them run." Visconti himself later recalled: "It came in handy so many times...because we'd get lost. We'd start with an idea then go in the wrong direction, and after an hour we'd say 'How did this start again?'" During the sessions for Low, Visconti became frustrated with the lack of studio staff present at the Château. At Hansa however, he was assisted by in-house engineer Eduard Meyer, who Visconti recalled was critical in maintaining a positive atmosphere. Likewise, the mood during "Heroes" was brighter and more optimistic than the sessions for Low. Bowie in particular was in a healthier state of mind. He and Visconti travelled around Berlin frequently and one on such occasion, they met Antonia Maass, a local jazz singer who would provide backing vocals on "Heroes".

=== Recording process ===
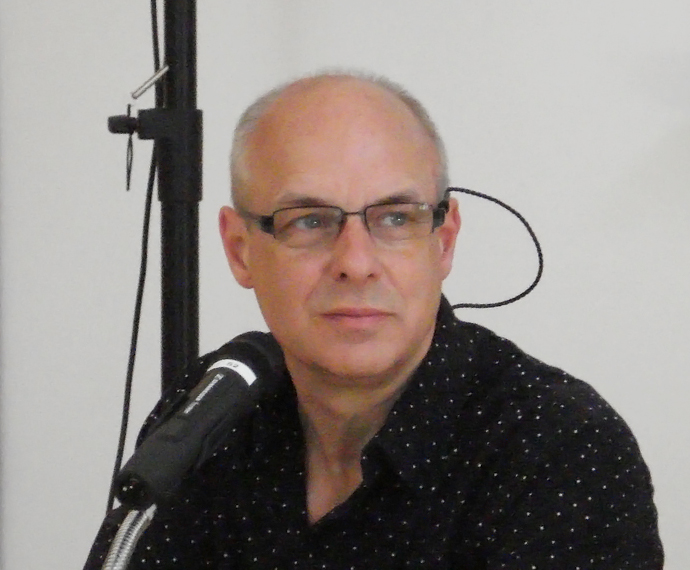
"Heroes" marked the second collaboration between Bowie and Brian Eno (pictured in 2008). Compared to Low, the sessions saw the use of Eno's Oblique Strategies cards, which were intended to spark creative ideas.

According to the biographer Thomas Jerome Seabrook, the recording process for "Heroes" began at a very quick pace, following along from Low's process, with the basic backing tracks for side one being completed in just two days. As per engineer Colin Thurston, rough demos were recorded with himself on drums, Visconti on bass and Bowie on keyboards, which the musicians heard once before recording. Although he fed Davis's drums through his Eventide H910 Harmonizer on Low, Visconti used it sparingly on "Heroes", only during the mixing stage, and as such, the drum sound is atmospheric to the room; Davis also added congas and timpani to his set to take advantage of the large studio space. Visconti gave high praise to Davis, calling him "one of the best drummers I've ever worked with," further calling Alomar and Murray "amazing musicians...you'd just throw a few chord changes at them and they'd run with it." In an interview with NME later in the year, Eno said the initial phase of recording was "all done in a very casual kind of way." Bowie gave "very brief instruction", then the band played. Hesitant at first, Eno found the process surprisingly effective, with most tracks being done in one take. Eno stated, "We did second takes, but they weren't nearly as good."

Overall, Eno had a much greater role on "Heroes" than he had for Low, being credited as co-author on four of the ten songs, leading Seabrook to call it the "truer" collaboration. Eno himself stated "We both worked on all the pieces all the time." Eno acted as "assistant director" to Bowie, giving feedback to the musicians and suggesting new – and unusual – ways to approach the tracks. One of these ways was the employment of Eno's Oblique Strategies cards. According to Chris O'Leary, these cards were "part-fortune cookie, part-Monopoly 'Chance' cards", intended to spark creative ideas. Although these cards were used greatly throughout the Lodger sessions, Eno and Bowie only used them on "Heroes" when creating the instrumentals, including on "V-2 Schneider", "Sense of Doubt" and "Moss Garden".

Following the initial sessions in July, recording for "Heroes" became more sporadic, with overdubs, vocals and mixing lasting until August. Like its predecessor, lyrics weren't written or recorded until all but Bowie and Visconti departed. Seabrook characterises this stage of recording as "sporadic bursts of inspiration surrounded by longer stretches of contemplation." When making The Idiot and Lust for Life with Iggy Pop, Bowie became fascinated with Pop's ability to improvise lyrics while standing at the microphone. For "Heroes", he decided to use the same method. Visconti later attested: "He'd never have a clue what he'd sing about until he actually walked in front of the microphone." Bowie usually completed his vocals in only one or two takes; Visconti provided backing vocals in the same fashion. The final mixes were done at Mountain Studios in Montreux, Switzerland, a studio that became one of Bowie's mainstays. An engineer at Mountain, David Richards, also became one of his regulars. Richards' assistant was Eugene Chaplin, the son of silent film star Charlie Chaplin.

== Music and lyrics ==
As the second release of the Berlin Trilogy, the music on "Heroes" expands on the material found on its predecessor Low. The songs have been described by Consequence of Sound as art rock and experimental rock, while also further continuing Bowie's work in the electronic and ambient genres. Like its predecessor, the songs on "Heroes" emphasise tone and atmosphere rather than guitar-based rock. However, they are more positive in both tone and atmosphere than the songs of its predecessor; the author James Perone considers it more accessible, while Visconti described it as "a very positive version of Low." Biographer Paul Trynka writes that the record evokes "both past and future". It also follows the same structure as its predecessor, with side one featuring more conventional tracks, and side two featuring mostly instrumental tracks.

The author Peter Doggett writes that whereas Low featured lyrics of autobiographical nature, the lyrics of "Heroes" were "oblique and often deliberately evasive", and were sung with an "astonishing" amount of passion. Visconti recalled that lyrics were made up on the spot, with Bowie sometimes ad-libbing entire songs, singing "at the top of his lungs". Songs of this instance included "Joe the Lion", a tribute to the American artist Chris Burden, who was known for his outlandish publicity stunts, and "Blackout", which references the New York City blackout of 1977. Like the second side of Low, the imagery of the Berlin Wall dominates "Heroes" throughout; a kiss between Visconti and Maass at the foot of the Wall inspired a lyric for the title track. Bowie's vocal for "'Heroes'" goes from calm and playful to a near-scream, a style he called "Bowie histrionics". Musically, Fripp's guitar feedback dominates throughout, while the bass pulsates and Eno's synthesisers blend into the background. Bowie explained the song is about "facing reality and standing up to it" and finding joy in life. David Buckley particularly highlights the lyric "We can be heroes, just for one day" as "an acknowledgment that the future didn't belong to him anymore, [but] to everyone".

"Sons of the Silent Age" was the only song written before the sessions began and was originally intended to be the album's title track. The lyrics are influenced by the works of Jacques Brel and follow several characters that are, in O'Leary's words, "part-homo superior/part-Bewlay Brothers". Musically, the song is noted by biographers as different than the rest of the songs on the album, in that the themes present reflect ideals from the previous decade rather than the contemporary, while O'Leary likens its sound more to that of Hunky Dory (1971) than the rest of the album. Biographers also consider the album's closer, "The Secret Life of Arabia", as a precursor to what Bowie explored on Lodger.

The instrumentals are described by Buckley as dark and gloomy. "Sense of Doubt" puts a repeating four-note piano motif against a set of synthesisers to paint an image of a barren landscape. Bowie plays the Japanese instrument koto on "Moss Garden" which, together with synths, evoke a sound resembling aeroplanes flying overhead; Bowie further emphasises his fascination with Japan by stating he's "under Japanese influence" in "Blackout". "Moss Garden" segues into "Neuköln", which is named after a quarter in Berlin. The track uses sound to capture the feeling of despair and desperation that the Turkish immigrants who lived there experienced.

The majority of Low was influenced by krautrock bands such as Tangerine Dream, Kraftwerk and Neu! Earlier in 1977, Kraftwerk name-checked both Bowie and Iggy Pop on the title track of Trans-Europe Express, which was Kraftwerk's response to the title track of Station to Station. Although the influence of Kraftwerk and Harmonia are less prominent on "Heroes" in favour of Edgar Froese, Bowie paid tribute by naming the album after Neu!'s track "Hero" from their album Neu! '75, while "V-2 Schneider" is inspired by and named after Kraftwerk's Florian Schneider. However, many British listeners assumed "V-2" was a reference to the type of rockets used by the German army in World War II. "V-2 Schneider" is also notable for having an off-beat saxophone part played by Bowie, who began the take on the wrong beat but decided he liked it better and kept it as is.

== Artwork ==
The cover photo was taken by the Japanese photographer Masayoshi Sukita at Harajuku Studios in Tokyo, Japan, in April 1977. Like the artwork for Iggy Pop's The Idiot, the cover is a nod to German artist Erich Heckel's paintings Roquairol and Young Man, the former of which Bowie witnessed during a visit to the Brücke Museum in Berlin. Pegg describes Bowie's pose as "a wild-eyed Bowie locked in a rigid pose of serio-comic agitation, raising a flat palm as though he has just mimetically lifted the final mask of artifice from his face." In an interview with Charles Shaar Murray of NME, Bowie said that the quotation marks in the title "indicate a dimension of irony about the word 'heroes' or about the whole concept of heroism". Visconti later stated that the album was "heroic" in that it was a very positive period of Bowie's life and during the making of the album, everyone felt like heroes. Regarding the title, Bowie said, "I thought I'd pick on the only narrative song to use as the title," quipping he could have titled it The Sons of Silent Ages.

== Release and promotion ==
The title track was chosen as the lead single and released on 23 September 1977, with fellow album track "V-2 Schneider" as the B-side. It was released in a shortened edited form in the hopes of more airplay, but Buckley believes this edit results in the song losing some of its "dramatic appeal". It was supported by a music video, shot in Paris and directed by Nick Ferguson, that features Bowie in the same jacket as on the album cover against a backdrop of white light. For the German and French releases of the single, titled "'Helden'" and "'Héros'", respectively, Bowie re-recorded his vocals in both languages, with lyrics translated by Antonia Maass for the German release. Despite the song's later mass acclaim, it was initially a failure, peaking at number 24 on the UK Singles Chart and failing to chart in the US. Pegg and Chris O'Leary note that it wasn't until Bowie's Live Aid performance in 1985 that the song become recognised as a classic. Bowie later remarked in 2003: "This is a strange phenomenon that happens with my songs Stateside. Many of the crowd favourites were never radio or chart hits, and '"Heroes"' tops them all."

I didn't promote Low at all and some people thought my heart wasn't in it. This time, I wanted to put everything into pushing the new album. I believe in the last two albums, you see, more than anything I've done before. I mean, I look back on a lot of my earlier work and, although there's much that I appreciate about it, there's not a great deal that I actually like...There's a lot more heart and emotion in Low and, especially, the new album.

— David Bowie discussing his extensive promotion of "Heroes", 1977

RCA issued "Heroes" on 14 October 1977, with the catalogue number RCA PL 12522. Its release came amid the punk rock movement, whose music and fashion had been influenced by Bowie. RCA marketed "Heroes" with the slogan "There's Old Wave. There's New Wave. And there's David Bowie ..." Trynka praises the slogan as "a masterful piece of positioning that allowed David to remain aloof from a punk movement that, like glam before it, would turn into a parody of itself." Unlike Low, Bowie promoted "Heroes" extensively, conducting numerous interviews and performing on various television programmes, including Marc, Bing Crosby's Merrie Olde Christmas (where he recorded "Peace on Earth/Little Drummer Boy" with Crosby), and Top of the Pops (where he performed the title track).

The album was a commercial success in the UK, peaking at number 3 on the UK Albums Chart and remained on the chart for 33 weeks. It fared less favourably in the US, where it peaked at number 35 on the Billboard Top LPs & Tape chart, spending 19 weeks on the chart. Doggett writes that the album ended a string of eight top 20 albums in the US, becoming his worst-selling album there since 1971's Hunky Dory. RCA released "Beauty and the Beast" as the second single on 6 January 1978, with "Sense of Doubt" as the B-side. It became a minor success in the UK, peaking at number 39 on the UK Singles Chart, staying on the chart for three weeks. NME editors Roy Carr and Charles Shaar Murray remarked that its "jarring, threatening edge...obviously put off a great many of the floating singles buyers attracted by the intoxicating romanticism of its immediate predecessor". The single was released in the US and Spain on a 12" promo and in a five-minute extended form, which failed to chart despite having 1975's "Fame" as the B-side.

== Critical reception ==
On release, "Heroes" received very positive reviews from music critics. Allan Jones of Melody Maker described it and its predecessor "among the most adventurous and notably challenging records yet thrust upon the rock audience." Angus MacKinnon of NME called it Bowie's "most moving performance in years" and commended the artist's growing maturity. Kris Needs of ZigZag magazine further praised the record, noting that Bowie appeared to be continuing the musical explorations of Low, while at the same time, allowing listeners time to "catch up with Low". Needs ultimately described the album as "a strange, cold sometimes impenetrable album, but Bowie makes all these unlikely ingredients work." Writing in Hit Parader, American musician and author Patti Smith praised it as "a cryptic product of a high order of intelligence."

The record was not without its detractors. Tim Lott of Record Mirror gave the album a more mixed assessment, calling it "disjointed" and criticised the instrumentals on side two as having less "continuity" than the ones found on Low. Lott further considered Bowie's vocals "hollow" and the lyrics "opaque". Overall, he felt that other than the title track, "Heroes" was "a disappointment" and "a come-down from Low". In the US, a reviewer for Billboard also gave a mixed assessment, calling it an "extension" of both "Bowie's cosmic rock vision" and Low, and overall felt the record was "a musical excursion into a realm only Bowie himself can define." In the Los Angeles Times, Robert Hilburn lamented the way Bowie's "fluctuating pop interests caused him to shift from style to style faster than his ability to master them", ultimately calling it one of the artist's "least arresting turns". Creem's Trixie A. Balm liked side one but dismissed side two, ultimately finding "Heroes" "doesn't rock". In Canada, The Gazette's Juan Rodriguez commented on the "melodramatic space-rock from the genre's leading practitioner". The Philadelphia Inquirer gave "Heroes" one out of four stars, finding the album "more self-ingulgent than rewarding".

Some reviewers commented on Eno's contributions, including Bart Testa of Rolling Stone. He contended that after Bowie's "auteurist exploitation" of the former on Low, "Heroes" "prompts a much more enthusiastic reading of the collaboration, which here takes the form of a union of Bowie's dramatic instincts and Eno's unshakable sonic serenity". The Village Voice critic Robert Christgau was less receptive to Eno's contributions, particularly the second side's instrumentals, saying that they are "interesting background" but "merely noteworthy as foreground, admirably rather than attractively ragged", in comparison to "their counterparts on Low". "Heroes" was named album of the year by NME and Melody Maker. It also ranked tenth in Record Mirror's and Sounds' year-end lists. In the Village Voice's annual Pazz & Jop critics poll, "Heroes" finished 21st in the voting for 1977's top album.

== Legacy ==
=== Subsequent events ===
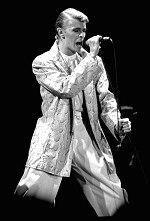
Bowie performing on the Isolar II tour in 1978

Upon completion of his promotional appearances for "Heroes", Bowie recorded narration for an adaptation of Sergei Prokofiev's classical composition Peter and the Wolf, released as an album in May 1978. Bowie later said that it was a Christmas present for his son, Duncan Jones, then seven years old. He then played the lead role in the David Hemmings-directed film Just a Gigolo. Released in February 1979, Just a Gigolo was panned by both critics and audiences. Bowie himself was critical of the film, calling it "my 32 Elvis Presley movies rolled into one" in an interview with NME.

After filming his scenes for Just a Gigolo in February 1978, Bowie began rehearsals for an upcoming tour. The Isolar II World Tour, also known as the Stage Tour, lasted from March to the end of the year. Songs from both Low and "Heroes" made up the majority of the shows, while Ziggy Stardust-era songs and other hits from 1973 to 1976 were played. By now Bowie had broken his drug addiction; Buckley writes that the tour was "Bowie's first tour for five years in which he had probably not anaesthetised himself with copious quantities of cocaine before taking the stage. ... Without the oblivion that drugs had brought, he was now in a healthy enough mental condition to want to make friends". Performances from the tour were released on the live album Stage in September the same year, and again from a different venue in 2018 on Welcome to the Blackout.

=== Critical legacy ===
Retrospective professional ratings
Review scores
Source	Rating
AllMusic	5/5 stars
Blender	4/5 stars
Chicago Tribune	3/4 stars
Christgau's Record Guide	B+
Encyclopedia of Popular Music	5/5 stars
Entertainment Weekly	A−
NME	8/10
Pitchfork	10/10
The Rolling Stone Album Guide	4.5/5 stars
Select	5/5
Spin Alternative Record Guide	5/10

Although "Heroes" was the best-received work of the Berlin Trilogy on release, in subsequent decades critical and public opinion has typically fallen in favour of Low as the more ground-breaking record owing to its daring experimental achievements. Pegg writes that the album is rather seen as an extension or refinement of its predecessor's achievements rather than a "definitive new work". Seabrook notes that Low had the advantage of being released first and seen as "the greatest and canniest musical move" of Bowie's entire career. However, compared to other records released in 1977, he writes that "Heroes" still "sounds like a blast from the future". Perone finds that the mix of songs and instrumentals makes "Heroes" feel more "integrated"; having "Sense of Doubt", "Moss Garden" and "Neuköln" flow from one to the next "give[s] the listener the feeling that [the album] was...meant to be experienced as a unified whole". "Heroes" has nonetheless been regarded as one of Bowie's best and most influential works.

Retrospective reviews praise Bowie's growth as an artist and Fripp's contributions. Stephen Thomas Erlewine of AllMusic praised the album, noting the growing artistic maturity compared to its predecessor. He further praised the addition of Fripp, stating that his guitar adds a greater "musical foundation" to the electronic sound. He ultimately writes: "The difference between Low and 'Heroes' [essentially] lies in the details, but the record is equally challenging and groundbreaking." Ryan Dombal of Pitchfork similarly praised the record, calling Bowie's vocal performances some of his finest and highlighted Fripp as the standout. In a review in which he commended the entire Berlin Trilogy, Dombal identified "Heroes" as the album that indicated the most artistic growth for Bowie, after turning 30 and escaping years of drug addiction. Many reviewers and biographers have particularly highlighted the title track as one of Bowie's finest, with some considering it his greatest song.

In a 2013 readers' poll for Rolling Stone, "Heroes" was voted Bowie's eighth best album. Five years later, the writers of Consequence of Sound ranked "Heroes" as Bowie's fifth-greatest album, stating that "The weary 'optimism' of "Heroes" is mesmerizing. Even on its gloomiest tracks, there's this upbeat, impassioned impression that everything's okay, even just for one day." In 2020, Brian Kay of Classic Rock History ranked "Heroes", along with Low and Lodger, as Bowie's seventh greatest work, calling the trilogy a "fascinating chapter" in Bowie's life. In 2013, NME ranked the album 329th in their list of the 500 Greatest Albums of All Time. It was voted number 185 in the third edition of Colin Larkin's All Time Top 1000 Albums. The album was also included in the 2018 edition of Robert Dimery's book 1001 Albums You Must Hear Before You Die.

=== Influence ===
An early instance of the album's influence was John Lennon's comment in 1980 that, when making his album Double Fantasy, his ambition was to "do something as good as 'Heroes'." The Irish rock band U2 chose to record their Eno-produced Achtung Baby (1991) at Hansa by the Wall in Berlin in honour of "Heroes" being recorded there. Other artists inspired by "Heroes" include Andy McCluskey of Orchestral Manoeuvres in the Dark, who referred to the "unconscious influence" of Bowie on his singing style, Vince Clarke, who called it a "rebellion inspiration", Ian Astbury of the Cult and Robyn Hitchcock. Scott Walker used "Heroes" as "the reference album" when making the Walker Brothers' Nite Flights (1978), according to engineer Steve Parker.

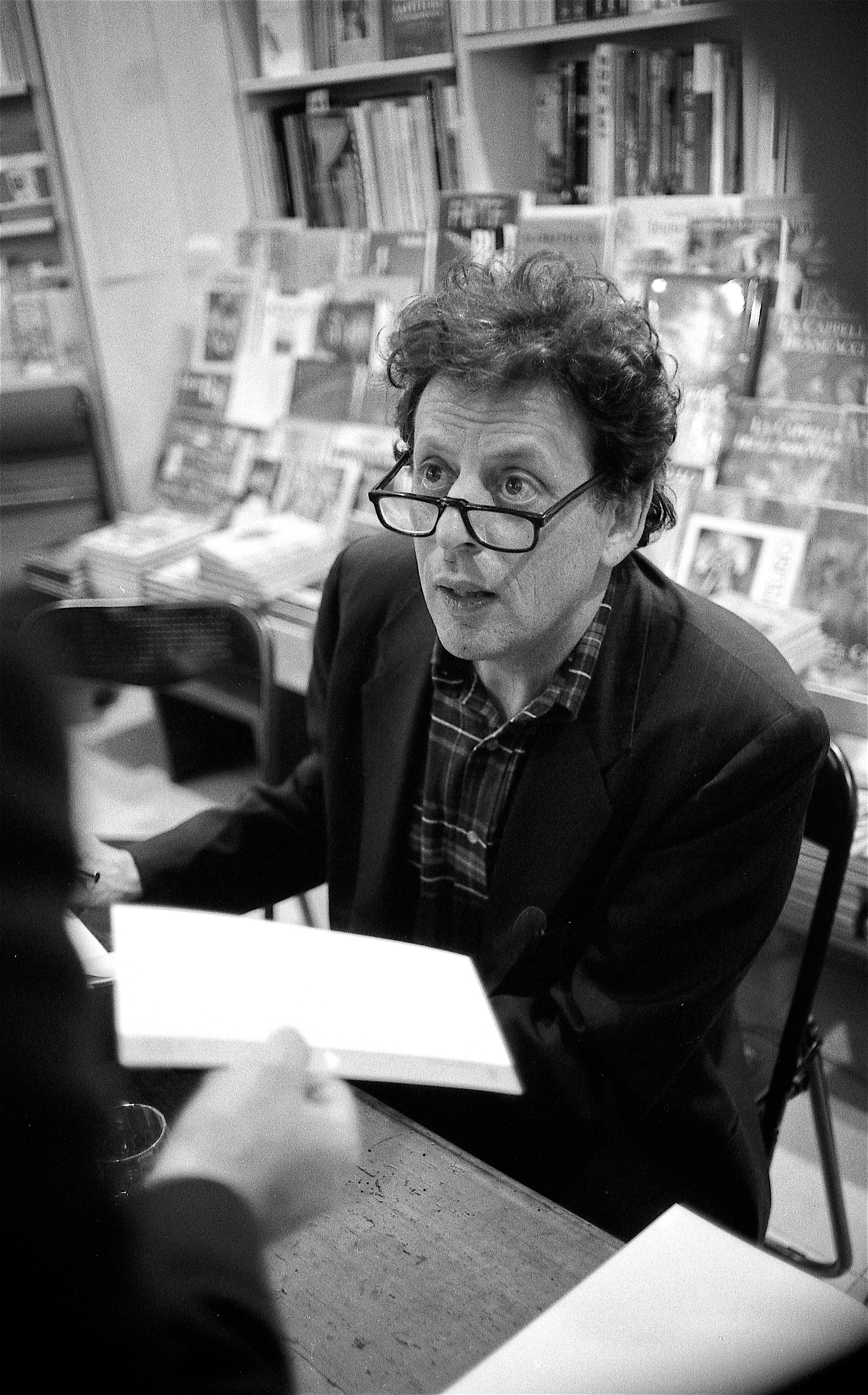
American composer Philip Glass (pictured in 1993) adapted "Heroes" into a classical music symphony in 1997.

In 1997, American composer Philip Glass adapted the album into a classical piece entitled "Heroes" Symphony. A follow-up to his earlier 1992 adaptation of Low, titled "Low" Symphony, the piece is separated into six movements, each named after tracks on "Heroes". Like its predecessor, Glass acknowledged Eno's contributions as equal to Bowie's on the original album and credited the movements to the two equally. Unlike the "Low" Symphony, the "Heroes" Symphony was developed into a ballet by American choreographer Twyla Tharp. Both the ballet and Symphony were greeted with acclaim. Bowie and Glass remained in contact with each other until 2003 and discussed making a third symphony, which never came to fruition. After Bowie's death in 2016, Glass stated the two had talked about adapting Lodger for the third symphony, which adapted as his 12th symphony in 2019. Glass described Low and "Heroes" as "part of the new classics of our time".

The cover of Bowie's 2013 album, The Next Day, is an altered and obscured version of the "Heroes" cover. This version has the word "'Heroes'" crossed out and Bowie's face obscured by an opaque white box reading "The Next Day". Designer Jonathan Barnbrook explained that Bowie had a feeling of isolation when making "Heroes" and he wanted to recapture that feeling for The Next Day. He further emphasised: "We tried out every single Bowie cover there's been, but it ended up as "Heroes" because it's such an iconic album, and the image on the front has the right kind of distance...The Next Day, in combination with the "Heroes" image, and what the album is saying about somebody who's looking back at his age...it just felt appropriate."

== Reissues ==
"Heroes" has been reissued several times. RCA reissued the album on vinyl in 1980 and released it on compact disc for the first time in the mid-1980s. It was subsequently reissued in 1991 by Rykodisc with two bonus tracks, including the outtake "Abdulmajid". A further CD release in 1999 by EMI/Virgin, without bonus tracks, featured 24-bit digitally remastered sound.

In 2017, the album was remastered for the A New Career in a New Town (1977–1982) box set released by Parlophone that September. It was released in CD, vinyl, and digital formats, as part of this compilation and then separately in February 2018. A volume shift in the 2017 remaster of the title track received ire from fans and critics, but Parlophone proceeded to describe it as intentional and unalterable, because of damages in the original master tapes. After the critical voices failed to lessen, a statement was released on the official Bowie website announcing corrected replacement disks for the "Heroes" CD and LP; the replacement disc offer lasted until June 2018. The amended remaster featured on the replacement discs was also used for the standalone CD and LP release of "Heroes" in February 2018.

== Track listing ==
All lyrics are written by David Bowie; all music is composed by Bowie, except where noted.

Side one
No.	Title	Music	Length
1.	"Beauty and the Beast"		3:32
2.	"Joe the Lion"		3:05
3.	"'Heroes'"	Bowie, Brian Eno	6:07
4.	"Sons of the Silent Age"		3:15
5.	"Blackout"		3:50
Total length:			19:49

Side two
No.	Title	Music	Length
1.	"V-2 Schneider"		3:10
2.	"Sense of Doubt"		3:57
3.	"Moss Garden"	Bowie, Eno	5:03
4.	"Neuköln"	Bowie, Eno	4:34
5.	"The Secret Life of Arabia"	Bowie, Eno, Carlos Alomar	3:46
Total length:			20:30 (40:19)

== Personnel ==
Personnel per the liner notes and biographer Nicholas Pegg.

- David Bowie – vocals, keyboards, guitars, saxophone, koto, tambourine, backing vocals
- Brian Eno – synthesisers, keyboards, guitar treatments
- Robert Fripp – lead guitar
- Carlos Alomar – rhythm guitar
- George Murray – bass guitar
- Dennis Davis – drums, percussion
- Tony Visconti – percussion, backing vocals
- Antonia Maass (Maaß) – backing vocals

Technical

- David Bowie – producer
- Tony Visconti – producer, engineer
- Colin Thurston – engineer
- David Richards – assistant engineer, mixing
- Eugene Chaplin – assistant engineer
- Jonathan Wyner – mastering engineer
- Masayoshi Sukita – cover photograph

== Charts ==
=== Weekly charts ===
Weekly chart performance for "Heroes"
Chart (1977–2018)	Peak position
Australian Albums (Kent Music Report)	6
Austrian Albums (Ö3 Austria)	19
Canada Top Albums/CDs (RPM)	44
Dutch Albums (Album Top 100)	3
Finnish Albums (Suomen virallinen lista)	30
French Albums (SNEP)	19
German Albums (Offizielle Top 100)	44
Italian Albums (FIMI)	38
Italian Albums (Musica e dischi)	11
Japanese Albums (Oricon)	57
New Zealand Albums (RMNZ)	15
Norwegian Albums (VG-lista)	13
Spanish Albums (Promusicae)	71
Swedish Albums (Sverigetopplistan)	13
Swiss Albums (Schweizer Hitparade)	34
UK Albums (Official Charts)	3
US Billboard Top LPs & Tape	35

=== Year-end charts ===
1977 year-end chart performance for "Heroes"
Chart (1977)	Position
Dutch Albums (Album Top 100)	20
French Albums (SNEP)	94

1978 year-end chart performance for "Heroes"
Chart (1978)	Position
Australian Albums (Kent Music Report)	87
Dutch Albums (Album Top 100)	97

== Certifications ==
Sales certifications for "Heroes"
Region	Certification	Certified units/sales
Canada (Music Canada)	Gold	50,000^{^}
Netherlands	—	30,000
New Zealand (RMNZ)	Gold	7,500^{‡}
United Kingdom (BPI) 1999 release	Gold	100,000^{^}
Summaries
Worldwide	—	2,300,000
^{^} Shipments figures based on certification alone.^{‡} Sales+streaming figures based on certification alone.
