= Changestwobowie =

Compilation album by David Bowie
- Released: 16 November 1981
- Recorded: 1971–1980
- Genres: Art rock; glam rock; funk rock; soul; new wave
- Length: 42:37
- Label: RCA

David Bowie chronology
Christiane F. (1981)	Changestwobowie (1981)	Baal (1982)

Singles from Changestwobowie
- 1. "Wild Is the Wind" Released: November 1981

Professional ratings
Review scores
Source	Rating
AllMusic	3/5 stars
The Encyclopedia of Popular Music	2/5 stars
The Rolling Stone Album Guide	4.5/5 stars
Spin Alternative Record Guide	7/10

Changestwobowie is a compilation album by English rock musician David Bowie, issued in November 1981 through RCA Records. It is a companion volume to the 1976 compilation Changesonebowie, and its title and artwork follow the format of that album.

In addition to selected post-1976 singles, the album collected five songs from earlier in Bowie's career that had not appeared on Changesonebowie, including "Wild Is the Wind" from Station to Station, which was released as a single to promote the album, along with a newly filmed video for the track. However, the album did not repeat the chart success of the earlier compilation, reaching No. 24 on the UK Album Chart and No. 68 in the United States.

RCA reissued the album on CD in 1984, but it was soon deleted, along with Bowie's other albums, following Bowie's acrimonious departure from RCA. Changestwobowie was not reissued when Rykodisc obtained the rights to reissue the Bowie catalog in 1990; Rykodisc assembled a new compilation, Changesbowie, an expanded version of RCA's Changesonebowie containing two tracks from Changestwobowie.

In April 2018, Rhino reissued Changestwobowie with its original RCA track listing and cover art on vinyl, CD, and digital/streaming formats.

== Track listing ==
All songs written by David Bowie, except where noted.

Side one
No.	Title	Album	Length
1.	"Aladdin Sane (1913-1938-197?)/On Broadway" (Bowie, Barry Mann, Cynthia Weil, Jerry Leiber and Mike Stoller)	Aladdin Sane (1973)	5:10
2.	"Oh! You Pretty Things"	Hunky Dory (1971)	3:13
3.	"Starman"	The Rise and Fall of Ziggy Stardust and the Spiders from Mars (1972)	4:14
4.	"1984"	Diamond Dogs (1974)	3:28
5.	"Ashes to Ashes" (single edit)	Scary Monsters (And Super Creeps) (1980)	3:37
Total length:			19:42

Side two
No.	Title	Album	Length
1.	"Sound and Vision"	Low (1977)	3:03
2.	"Fashion" (single edit)	Scary Monsters (And Super Creeps)	3:25
3.	"Wild Is the Wind" (Dimitri Tiomkin, Ned Washington)	Station to Station (1976)	6:03
4.	"John, I'm Only Dancing (Again) 1975"	Recorded 1974; single A-side (1979)	6:59
5.	"DJ" (single edit; Bowie, Brian Eno, Carlos Alomar)	Lodger (1979)	3:25
Total length:			22:55 (42:37)

== Charts ==
Album

Year	Chart	Position
1982	UK Albums Chart	24
1982	Billboard Pop Albums	68
1982	New Zealand Albums {RMNZ}	28
1982	Swedish Albums (Sverigetopplistan)	35
2018	Belgium Albums (Ultratop Flanders)	105
2018	Belgium Albums (Ultratop Wallonia)	168

== Certifications ==
Organization	Level	Date
BPI – UK	Gold	12 January 1982
