= Symphony No. 4 (Glass) =

1996 symphony composed by Philip Glass

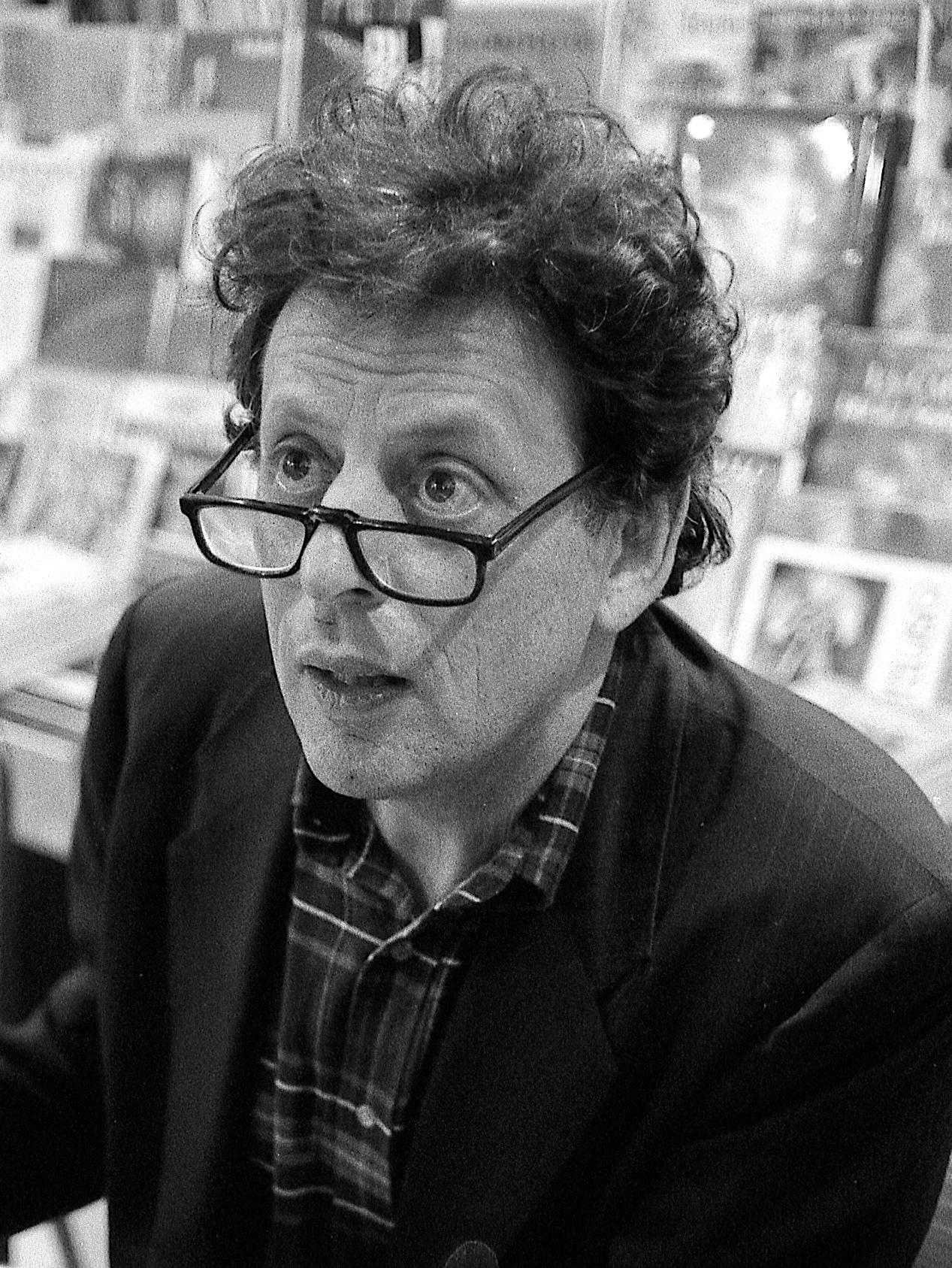
Philip Glass in 1993

Symphony No. 4 ("Heroes") is a symphony composed by American composer Philip Glass in 1996 based on the album "Heroes" by David Bowie. Glass had based his earlier Symphony No. 1 on the David Bowie album Low.

== Symphony ==
The symphony is scored for 2 flutes, piccolo, 2 oboes, 2 clarinets, bass clarinet, 2 bassoons, 3 horns, 3 trumpets, 2 trombones, bass trombone, tuba, percussion, harp, piano, celesta, and strings.

The symphony is in six movements:

1. "Heroes"
2. Abdulmajid
3. Sense of Doubt
4. Sons of the Silent Age
5. Neuköln
6. V2 Schneider

"Abdulmajid", the David Bowie song on which the second movement was based, was not included on the original release of Heroes, but was recorded around the Heroes recording sessions. The song would later be released on the Rykodisc reissue of the album in 1991.

== Album ==
"Heroes" Symphony

Studio album by Philip Glass
- Released: 1996
- Recorded: 1996; Looking Glass Studios, NYC
- Genre: Classical
- Length: 44:11
- Label: Point Music
- Producers: Kurt Munkacsi, Michael Riesman

The album "Heroes" Symphony includes only the "Heroes" Symphony performed by American Composers Orchestra directed by Michael Riesman and conducted by Dennis Russell Davies. Recorded and distributed by POINT Music record label, a joint venture of Euphorbia Productions Ltd and Philips Classics Productions, catalog number 454-388-2.

Professional ratings
Review scores
Source	Rating
Entertainment Weekly	B

=== Track listing ===
1. "Heroes" (5:53)
2. Abdulmajid (8:53)
3. Sense of Doubt (7:20)
4. Sons of the Silent Age (8:18)
5. Neuköln (6:41)
6. V2 Schneider (6:48)
