= All Saints (David Bowie album) =

All Saints: Collected Instrumentals 1977–1999
- 2001 commercial release cover

Compilation album by David Bowie
- Released: 9 July 2001 (commercial release); 1993 (private release)
- Recorded: 1975–1993 (original); 1994–1999 (additional tracks on commercial release)
- Genres: Rock; electronic; ambient
- Length: 91:16 (private); 75:46 (commercial)
- Labels: No label (original); Virgin/EMI Records
- Producers: David Bowie, Tony Visconti, Nile Rodgers, David Richards, Reeves Gabrels, Kurt Muckacsi, Michael Riesman

David Bowie chronology
Bowie at the Beeb (2000)	All Saints: Collected Instrumentals 1977–1999 (2001)	Heathen (2002)

David Bowie compilation chronology
Bowie at the Beeb (2000)	All Saints (2001)	Best of Bowie (2002)

Alternative cover
- 1993 private release cover

Professional ratings
Review scores
Source	Rating
AllMusic	2.5/5 stars
The Encyclopedia of Popular Music	3/5 stars

All Saints: Collected Instrumentals 1977–1999 is the name of two different compilation albums of instrumental works by the English musician David Bowie.

The first was a two-disc set made as a Christmas gift for Bowie's friends and family in 1993; only 150 copies were made. The album became a collector's item. In 2001, a second album, All Saints: Collected Instrumentals 1977–1999, was released by Bowie. For this release, the tracks originating from the Black Tie White Noise (1993) album ("Pallas Athena", "The Wedding", "Looking for Lester"), as well as "South Horizon" from The Buddha of Suburbia (1993), were dropped, with "Brilliant Adventure" from Hours (1999) and the non-album single "Crystal Japan" (1980) appearing in their place.

== Track listings ==
All songs written by David Bowie, except where noted.

All Saints – Original 1993 edition / Disc 1
No.	Title	Writer(s)	Length
1.	"Warszawa"	Bowie, Brian Eno	6:17
2.	"Some Are" (From the Low Symphony)	Bowie, Eno, Philip Glass	11:17
3.	"Subterraneans"		5:37
4.	"Sense of Doubt"		3:57
5.	"Moss Garden"	Bowie, Eno	5:03
6.	"Neuköln"	Bowie, Eno	4:34
7.	"Art Decade"		3:43
8.	"The Mysteries"		7:08
9.	"Ian Fish U.K. Heir"		6:20

All Saints – Original 1993 edition / Disc 2
No.	Title	Writer(s)	Length
10.	"Abdulmajid"	Bowie, Eno	3:40
11.	"South Horizon"		5:20
12.	"Weeping Wall"		3:25
13.	"Pallas Athena"		4:40
14.	"A New Career in a New Town"		2:50
15.	"The Wedding"		5:04
16.	"V-2 Schneider"		3:10
17.	"Looking for Lester"	Bowie, Nile Rodgers	5:36
18.	"All Saints"	Bowie, Eno	3:35

All Saints: Collected Instrumentals 1977–1999 – 2001 edition
No.	Title	Writer(s)	Length
1.	"A New Career in a New Town"		2:50
2.	"V-2 Schneider"		3:10
3.	"Abdulmajid"	Bowie, Eno	3:40
4.	"Weeping Wall"		3:25
5.	"All Saints"	Bowie, Eno	3:35
6.	"Art Decade"		3:43
7.	"Crystal Japan"		3:08
8.	"Brilliant Adventure"	Bowie, Reeves Gabrels	1:51
9.	"Sense of Doubt"		3:57
10.	"Moss Garden"	Bowie, Eno	5:03
11.	"Neuköln"	Bowie, Eno	4:34
12.	"The Mysteries"		7:12
13.	"Ian Fish U.K. Heir"		6:27
14.	"Subterraneans"		5:37
15.	"Warszawa"	Bowie, Eno	6:17
16.	"Some Are"	Bowie, Eno, Glass	11:17
Total length:			75:46
