= Warszawa (song) =

Song by David Bowie

from the album Low
- Released: 14 January 1977
- Recorded: September–November 1976
- Studio: Château d'Hérouville (Hérouville)
- Genre: Ambient; electronic
- Length: 6:23
- Label: RCA
- Songwriters: David Bowie; Brian Eno
- Producers: David Bowie; Tony Visconti

"Warszawa" is a mostly instrumental song by David Bowie and Brian Eno originally released in 1977 on the album Low. The band Joy Division was initially called Warsaw as a reference to this song.

== Composition and recording ==
The piece is intended to evoke the "very bleak atmosphere" Bowie said he experienced from his visit to Warsaw the previous year. He had to leave the recording sessions to travel to Paris where he was dealing with some legal issues. He instructed Eno to create "a really slow piece of music with a very emotive, almost religious feel to it". The melody Bowie sings in the middle part of the song is based on a recording of "Helokanie" by Polish folk choir Śląsk, although Bowie's lyrics are invented words, not words in Polish. Bowie had purchased a recording of Śląsk performing the piece during a stopover in Warsaw.

The piece is in four sections. The first section features drones in octaves played on piano and synthesisers. A fanfare motif states the chord of A major which is answered by a phrase: A, B, C, transforming it to A minor. It is these notes that Eno says he heard being played repeatedly by Tony Visconti's son at the studio piano. Transposed up a semitone, they later form the opening of the main melody at 1:17 in the key of F# major. This is played on a Chamberlin, a keyboard instrument that utilises tape loops of orchestral instruments, with Eno using the voices of cellos and flutes. After the melody is heard twice, at 3:47 the key drops a tone to E major, the texture thins out and Bowie's vocal enters. At 5:24 the final section starts which is reprise of the first half of the melody heard at 1:17.

== Live versions ==
It was used as a live opener on Bowie's Isolar II and Heathen tours. Rather than quickly delving deeply into loud rock music, the song was used to intentionally provoke the audience into a calm, holding them initially in deep suspense. Bowie's choice to maintain a low profile during 1978 was expressed through his entrance to the stage during this song, not singing, but simply sinking into the band and playing the Chamberlin until his cue to sing the lyrics. These versions had Bowie on Chamberlin, Simon House on electric violin (and a violin solo to replace the higher notes sung by Bowie on original recording), Roger Powell on synthesizers, Sean Mayes on grand piano and ARP Solina String Synthesizer, George Murray on bass guitar, Dennis Davis on cymbals and percussion with Carlos Alomar conducting the band and Adrian Belew looking on with his electric guitar turned down (waiting for his cue to begin "Heroes" the song that was played afterwards).

- A spring 1978 performance of the piece, which opened concerts on the Isolar II Tour, can be heard on Bowie's second live album, Stage, while a summer 1978 performance from the same tour is included on Welcome to the Blackout (2018).
- It was performed live in 2002 at the Roseland Ballroom during a performance of the entirety of Low, with the exception of "Weeping Wall". The same songs were also performed live at the Montreux Jazz Festival. The latter performance is included on CD2 and CD3 in the 2025 box set I Can't Give Everything Away (2002–2016).

== Personnel ==
- David Bowie: Vocals
- Brian Eno: Mini-Moog, Piano, Chamberlin, EMS Synthi

== Other releases ==
- It appeared in the Sound + Vision box set (1989)
- It was featured in the movie Christiane F. and the accompanying soundtrack.
- It was used in the Bowie extended music video "Jazzin' for Blue Jean".
- It features on the All Saints instrumental collection.
- It features in the movie Control about Ian Curtis of Joy Division and the accompanying soundtrack.
- It features in the trailers for the BBC's 2006 Dracula film
- It appeared in the Instrumental (disc 2) by Brian Eno

== Cover versions ==
- De Benedictis/Maroulis – A Tribute to the Music and Works by Brian Eno (1997)
- Emulsion – .2 Contamination: A Tribute to David Bowie (2006)
- Philip Glass – Low Symphony (1993)
- Nine Inch Nails – live recording, with David Bowie (1995)
- Simon Haram – Alone… (1999)
- Ah Cama-Sotz – Declaration Of Innocence (2008)
- Red Hot Chili Peppers – Live at Bemowo (2012-07-27)
- Dylan Howe: Subterranean – New Designs on Bowie's Berlin (2014)
- s t a r g a z e – performed live at the BBC Proms, 29 July 2016
- Donny McCaslin – Beyond Now (2016)
- Geir Sundstøl – Brødløs (2018)
- Shearwater – as part of a live performance of the entire Berlin Trilogy for WNYC (2018)
- Sterbus – acoustic version live in Rome, Italy, 5 December 2019

== Sources ==
- Greatorex, Johnathan. Just a Mortal With Potential. Teenage Wildlife. November 1996.
- Miles, Barry. David Bowie Black Book. London: Omnibus Press, 1980.
- David Power, David Bowie: A Sense of Art Paupers Press, 2003.
- West, Mike (1984). Joy Division. Todmorden: Babylon. ISBN 0-9071-8821-4.
