= Low (David Bowie album) =

1977 studio album by David Bowie

Studio album by David Bowie
- Released: 14 January 1977
- Recorded: September–October 1976 (Note: A small portion of the track "Subterraneans" was recorded in December 1975 at Cherokee Studios in Los Angeles.)
- Studios: Château d'Hérouville (Hérouville, France); Hansa (West Berlin, Germany)
- Genres: Art rock; avant-pop; electronic; ambient; experimental rock
- Length: 38:26
- Label: RCA Victor
- Producers: David Bowie; Tony Visconti

David Bowie chronology
Changesonebowie (1976)	Low (1977)	"Heroes" (1977)

Singles from Low
- 1. "Sound and Vision" / "A New Career in a New Town" Released: 11 February 1977; 2. "Be My Wife" / "Speed of Life" Released: 17 June 1977

Low is the eleventh studio album by the English musician David Bowie, released on 14 January 1977 through RCA Records. The first of three collaborations with the producer Tony Visconti and the musician Brian Eno that became known as the Berlin Trilogy, the project originated following Bowie's move to France in 1976 with his friend Iggy Pop to rid themselves of their drug addictions. There, Bowie produced and co-wrote Pop's debut solo studio album, The Idiot, featuring sounds Bowie would explore on his next record. After completing The Idiot, sessions for Low began at Hérouville's Château d'Hérouville in September 1976 and ended in October at Hansa Studios in West Berlin, where Bowie and Pop had relocated.

An art rock record influenced by German bands such as Tangerine Dream, Neu!, Harmonia and Kraftwerk, Low features Bowie's first explorations in electronic and ambient styles. Side one consists primarily of short, direct avant-pop song-fragments, with mostly downbeat lyrics reflecting Bowie's state of mind, and side two comprises longer, mostly instrumental tracks, conveying musical observations of Berlin. Visconti created the distinctive drum sound using an Eventide H910 Harmonizer, a pitch-shifting device. The cover artwork, a profile of Bowie from the film The Man Who Fell to Earth (1976), was intended as a visual pun, meaning "low profile".

RCA refused to issue Low for three months, fearing it would be a commercial failure. Upon release, it divided critical opinion and received little promotion from RCA or Bowie, who opted to tour as Pop's keyboardist. Nevertheless, it reached number 2 in the UK and number 11 in the US. Two singles were released: "Sound and Vision", a UK top five hit, and "Be My Wife". The success prompted RCA to release The Idiot in March 1977. In mid-1977, Bowie performed on Pop's follow-up album Lust for Life before recording his next album, "Heroes", which expanded on Low's musical approach and features a similar mix of songs and instrumentals.

In later decades, critics have rated Low one of Bowie's best works, and it has appeared on several lists of the greatest albums of all time. It influenced numerous post-punk bands and its drum sound has been widely imitated. A forerunner in the development of the post-rock genre of the 1990s, Low has been reissued several times and was remastered in 2017 as part of the A New Career in a New Town (1977–1982) box set.

== Background and inspiration ==
In 1974, David Bowie developed a cocaine addiction. It worsened over the next two years, affecting his physical and mental state. He recorded Young Americans (1975) and Station to Station (1976), and filmed The Man Who Fell to Earth (1976), while under the drug's influence. Bowie attributed his growing addiction to Los Angeles, where he moved from New York City in early 1975. His drug intake escalated to the point where, decades later, he recalled almost nothing of the recording of Station to Station.

I was in serious decline, emotionally and socially [...] I think I was very much on course to be just another rock casualty [...] I'm quite certain I wouldn't have survived the Seventies if I'd carried on doing what I was doing [...] I was lucky enough to know somewhere within me that I really was killing myself, and I had to do something drastic to pull myself out of that.

— David Bowie in 1996 discussing his mental state in the 1970s

After completing Station to Station in December 1975, Bowie began work on a soundtrack for The Man Who Fell to Earth with Paul Buckmaster, who worked with Bowie on the 1969 album Space Oddity. Bowie expected to be wholly responsible for the music, but withdrew his work when he was invited to submit it along with the work of other composers: "I just said, 'Shit, you're not getting any of it.' I was so furious, I'd put so much work into it." Station to Station's co-producer Harry Maslin argued Bowie was "burned out" and could not complete the work. (Note: Bowie later said the only portion of the soundtrack used for Low was a reverse bass part on "Subterraneans", recorded at Cherokee Studios in Los Angeles, where Station to Station was recorded.) Bowie later sent the film's director Nicolas Roeg a copy of Low with a note that read, "This is what I wanted to do for the soundtrack. It would have been a wonderful score."

With the soundtrack abandoned, Bowie decided he was ready to free himself from the Los Angeles drug culture and move back to Europe. He began rehearsals for the Isolar tour to promote Station to Station in January 1976; the tour began on 2 February. Though it was critically acclaimed, Bowie became a controversial figure during the tour. Speaking as his persona the Thin White Duke, he made statements about Adolf Hitler and Nazi Germany that some interpreted as expressing sympathy for or promoting fascism. Bowie later blamed his erratic behaviour during this period on his addictions and precarious mental state, stating: "It was a dangerous period for me. I was at the end of my tether physically and emotionally and had serious doubts about my sanity."

After a London show in May 1976, Bowie caught up with Roxy Music's former keyboardist and conceptualist Brian Eno backstage. The two had met occasionally since 1973. After leaving Roxy Music, Eno had released two ambient solo albums in 1975: Another Green World and Discreet Music. Bowie listened to the latter regularly on the American leg of the tour. The biographers Marc Spitz and Hugo Wilcken later recognised Another Green World in particular as a major influence on the sound Bowie aimed to create for Low. (Note: Another Green World features songs with recognisable pop structures along with ambient instrumental tracks emphasising atmosphere and texture, elements that informed Bowie's approach on Low.) (Note: Christopher Sandford also cites Eno's Taking Tiger Mountain (By Strategy) (1974) as an influence.) Bowie and Eno became infatuated with the German musical movement known as krautrock, including the acts Tangerine Dream, Neu!, Kraftwerk and Harmonia. Eno had worked with Harmonia in the studio and on stage, and Bowie exhibited a krautrock influence on Station to Station, particularly its title track. After meeting, the pair agreed to stay in touch.

== Development ==
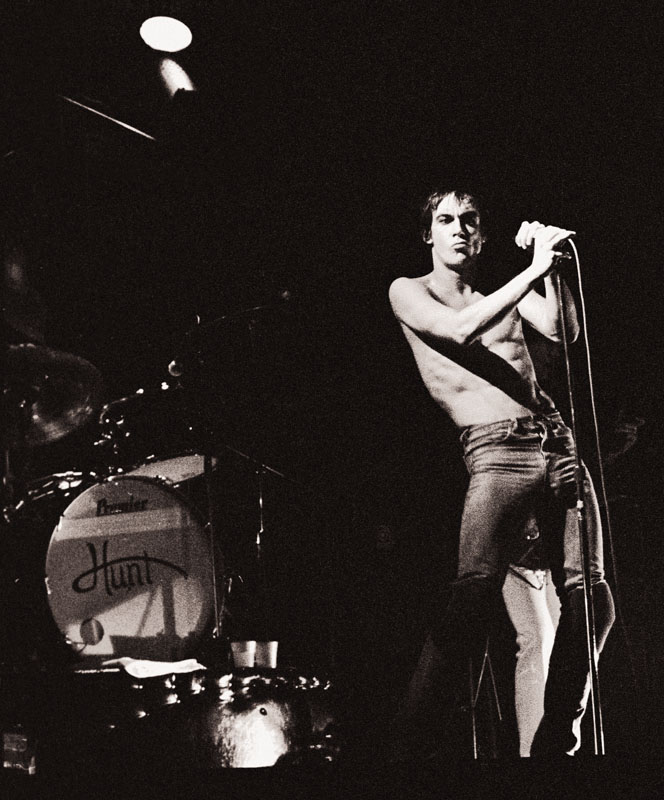
In the months before recording Low, Bowie co-wrote and produced The Idiot, Iggy Pop's (pictured in 1977) debut solo studio album. Due to the two albums featuring a similar sound, Nicholas Pegg described The Idiot as "a stepping stone between Station to Station and Low ".

At the conclusion of the Isolar tour in May 1976, Bowie and his wife Angie moved to Switzerland, although the two rarely spent time there. David booked studio time later in the summer at the Château d'Hérouville in Hérouville, France, (Note: Bowie had recorded his 1973 covers album Pin Ups at the Château.) where he made plans to write and produce an album for his old friend, the singer Iggy Pop. The two had been friends for many years, but had not worked together professionally since 1973. By 1976, Pop was also ready to rid himself of his own drug addiction and accepted Bowie's invitation to accompany him on tour, and moved to Europe with him.

Bowie and Pop recorded what became Pop's debut solo studio album, The Idiot, from July to August 1976. Bowie composed most of the music, and Pop wrote most of the lyrics, often in response to the tunes Bowie was creating. During the album's recording, Bowie developed a new process whereby the backing tracks were recorded first, followed by overdubs, with the lyrics and vocals written and recorded last. He heavily favoured this "three-phase" process, which he used for the rest of his career. Because The Idiot was recorded before Low, it has been referred to as the unofficial beginning of Bowie's Berlin period, as its music features a sound reminiscent of that which Bowie would explore in the Berlin Trilogy.

Bowie and Pop mixed The Idiot at Hansa Studios in West Berlin, with assistance from Tony Visconti, who was already in line to co-produce Bowie's next album; Bowie called on him to help mix the record to familiarise himself with his new way of working. Bowie and Pop fell in love with the city, finding it a place for a great escape, and decided to move there in a further attempt to erase their drug habits and escape the spotlight. The Idiot was completed by August 1976, but Bowie wanted to be sure he had his own album in stores before its release. Laurent Thibault, the Château's owner and The Idiot's bassist, opined that "[Bowie] didn't want people to think he'd been inspired by Iggy's album, when in fact it was all the same thing".

== Recording and production ==
=== History and personnel ===
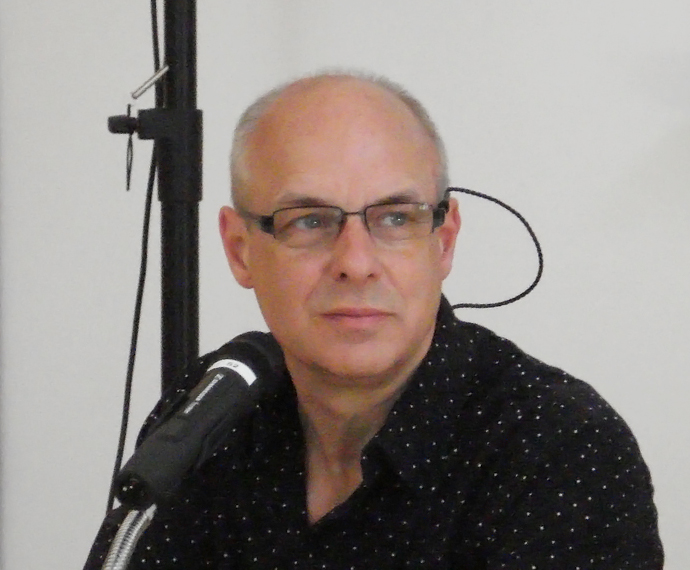
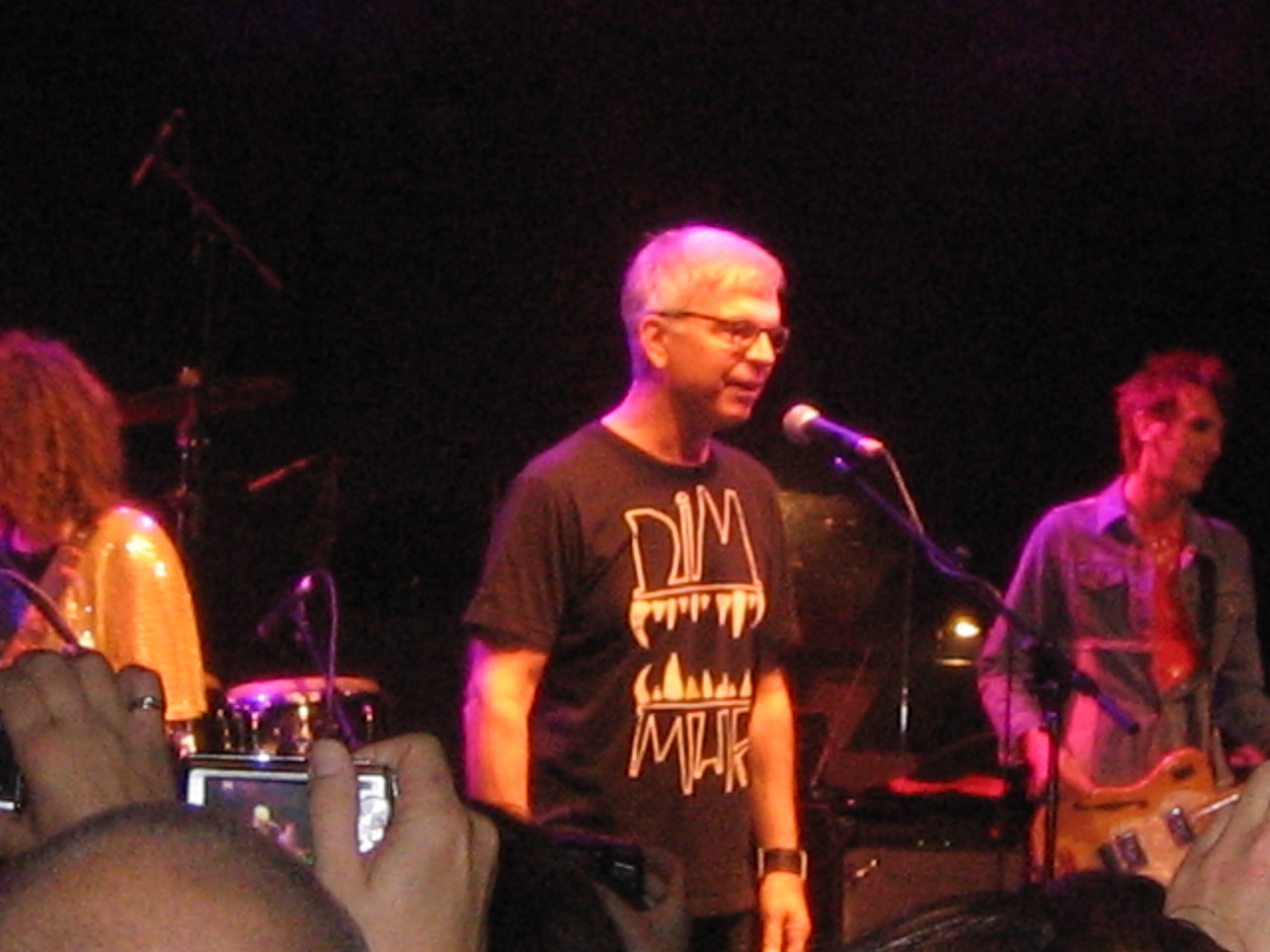
Brian Eno (left) and Tony Visconti (right) each contributed greatly to the production methods and sound of Low.

The Low sessions began on 1 September 1976. The album had the working title New Music: Night and Day. Although Low is considered the first of Bowie's Berlin Trilogy, most of it was recorded at the Château d'Hérouville in France. (Note: Although Bowie was ready to move fully to Berlin, he had already booked another month of studio time at the Château after The Idiot, so recording began there.) Returning from the Station to Station sessions were Carlos Alomar (guitar), George Murray (bass) and Dennis Davis (drums). Along with Eno, new members included Roy Young, the former keyboardist for the Rebel Rousers, and Ricky Gardiner, the former guitarist of Beggars Opera. A guest during the Château sessions was Visconti's then-wife Mary Hopkin, credited as Mary Visconti. She contributed backing vocals to "Sound and Vision".

Bowie and Visconti co-produced the album, with contributions from Eno. Visconti, who was absent for the recording of Station to Station because of conflicting schedules, was brought back to co-produce after mixing The Idiot. In 2000, Bowie stressed Visconti's importance as co-producer, stating that "the actual sound and texture, the feel of everything from the drums to the way that my voice is recorded," was due to Visconti. Eno was not a co-producer, despite being widely perceived as such. Visconti said: "Brian is a great musician, and was very integral to the making of those three albums [Low, "Heroes" and Lodger]. But he was not the producer." Benoît Clerc says that Eno was responsible for the "sound textures" used by Bowie.

Like The Idiot, the Low sessions began with Bowie and the rhythm players running through the backing tracks quickly, beginning in the evening and continuing into the night, which the biographer Thomas Jerome Seabrook believes fit the mood of the music perfectly. As he had done on Station to Station, Bowie left Alomar in charge of the guitar, bass and percussion arrangements, with instructions about how they should sound. Bowie brought many song ideas he had in Switzerland to the sessions; some, including "What in the World", were brought back from The Idiot.

According to the biographer Paul Trynka, Eno arrived after the backing tracks for side one were "essentially" finished. He and Bowie sat down with the musicians and informed them of the next stage in the recording process. According to Young, they played tapes of the Man Who Fell to Earth soundtrack for the musicians and said they planned something similar. Young and some of the other musicians were not fond of the idea, as it was outside their experiences. Bowie thought RCA would feel the same way, warning: "We don't know if this will ever be released, but I have to do this." Visconti insisted on completing the project, telling Bowie and Eno: "Wasting a month of my time with David Bowie and Brian Eno is not wasting a month of my time." Two weeks into the project, Visconti compiled a tape and played it for Bowie, who was surprised and enthusiastic that they had an album.

==== Drum sound ====
"Breaking Glass"
"Breaking Glass" showcases Low's drum sound, created using an Eventide H910 Harmonizer. The sound became widely imitated after the album's release, although Visconti refused to describe how he created it.

Low is noted for its unusual drum sound, described by the biographer David Buckley as "brutal" and "mechanistic". Davis played drums, which Visconti processed using an Eventide H910 Harmonizer. The Harmonizer was the first commercially available pitch-shifting device, which could alter the pitch of a sound without changing the speed. When Bowie asked what it did, Visconti replied, "It fucks with the fabric of time."

Visconti rigged the Harmonizer to Davis's snare drum and monitored the results through his headphones. Speaking to Buckley, Visconti said: "My brain nearly exploded when I found what I could do with drums." He fed the pitch-altered sound back into the device, creating "an infinite dropping of [the] pitch, ever renewing itself".

Buckley describes the sound, particularly evident on "Speed of Life", "Breaking Glass" and "Sound and Vision", as "revolutionary" and "stunning". Davis said it sounded "as big as a house". Bud Scoppa of Phonograph Record compares the sound to "cherry bombs exploding under tin cans". Trynka writes that Davis's "spirit and energy" propel the album's first side "onward". On its release, ZigZag's Kris Needs called the drum sound one of the best sounds he had ever heard, while Rolling Stone's Rob Sheffield later described it as "one of rock's all-time most imitated drum sounds".

=== Studio atmosphere ===
With no deadline or planned structure, Seabrook says the mood during the sessions was "upbeat and relaxed". The studio was in the middle of the French countryside, and the musicians bonded and experimented regularly. According to Trynka, Eno was responsible for Bowie's motivation. Even Alomar – the most resistant to Eno's "avant-garde bullshit" – warmed to the experimentation.

Seabrook writes that everyone ate together, watched the British television programme Fawlty Towers in their free time, and entertained each other with stories. Gardiner said, "We had some good conversations about music, astrology – the world." Davis was the "comedian" during the sessions, performing acts and telling tales. Pop was present throughout the sessions and contributed backing vocals to "What in the World". Gardiner recalled him being "fit, healthy and positive". Like Davis, he encouraged a positive atmosphere by telling stories of his time with the Stooges.

The sessions were not without problems. Most of the Château's staff were on holiday, leaving an inexperienced engineer and a kitchen staff who did not serve a variety of meals. Months after the sessions, Visconti said: "We found the studio totally useless. The people who own it now don't seem to care. We all came down with dysentery." Bowie and Visconti both contracted food poisoning.

Bowie was in a fragile state of mind throughout the sessions, as his days of cocaine addiction were not far behind him. He later said: "Low was largely drug-free. That was the first instance in a very long time that I'd gone into an album without anything like that to help me along. I was scared, because I thought that maybe my creativity had to be bound up with drugs – that it enhanced my ability to make music. But that album turned out okay." He also had conflicts with his wife and faced legal problems after firing his manager Michael Lippman; he left the sessions in September to work on resolving the case. Despite the problems, Visconti recalled that he, Bowie and Eno were working "at their peak".

By the end of September, Bowie and Visconti had grown tired of the Château. The former was mentally drained and the latter was frustrated by the lack of outside assistance. After recording the wordless vocals for "Warszawa", Bowie, Visconti, Pop and Bowie's assistant Coco Schwab left France for West Berlin. The sessions continued at Hansa Studios, (Note: According to Nicholas Pegg and Seabrook, it was not the same "Hansa by the Wall" location where Low would be mixed and "Heroes" would be recorded.) where the final tracks, "Weeping Wall" and "Art Decade", were completed, as well as vocal overdubs for the Château recordings. Recording continued until early October 1976, and mixing was finished later that month.

== Songs ==
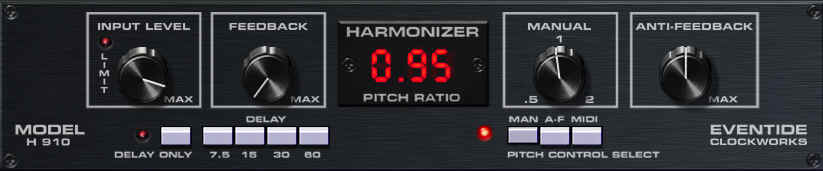
At the forefront of Low's sound was Visconti's recent acquisition: an Eventide H910 Harmonizer. When Bowie asked what it did, Visconti replied, "It fucks with the fabric of time."

Low features Bowie's first explorations of electronic and ambient music. Ultimate Classic Rock and Consequence of Sound retrospectively categorised Low as art rock and experimental rock, respectively. Along with its successor "Heroes", the songs on Low emphasise tone and atmosphere, rather than guitar-based rock. German bands like Tangerine Dream, Neu! and Kraftwerk influenced the music. Seabrook considers Neu! the biggest influence on Bowie's new musical direction; he explained that their 1975 album Neu! '75 is, like Low and "Heroes", characterised by a song/instrumental split and contains a song titled "Hero". Ron Hart of Observer recognised Kraftwerk's Radio-Activity (1975) as an influence, noting that album's harmony of "experimentalism and repetition" as providing the template for Low.

Side one consists primarily of short, direct avant-pop song-fragments; side two comprises longer, mostly instrumental tracks. In 1977, Bowie said side one was about himself and his "prevailing moods" at the time and side two is about his musical observations of living in Berlin. Musically, one reviewer characterised side one as a direct extension of Young Americans and Station to Station. Regarding the song/instrumental split, Visconti said: "We felt that getting six or seven songs with Bowie singing, with choruses and verses, still make for a good album ... then making the second side instrumental gave a perfect yin-yang balance." The biographer Chris O'Leary writes that the instrumental pieces share the theme of "a tour of an imaginary Eastern Europe by the isolate, paranoiac character of Low's manic side". Some tracks, including "Speed of Life" and "A New Career in a New Town", were originally going to have lyrics, but Bowie could not come up with suitable words and left them as instrumentals. The instrumentals feature Eno's portable EMS AKS synthesiser. Visconti recalled, "It had no keyboard, just a joystick, and he came up with wonderful sounds you can hear all over the album that weren't produced by conventional instruments."

=== Side one ===
The author Peter Doggett describes "Speed of Life" as a perfect opening track, in the sense that it brings the audience into "a subject too profound for words". It features a rapid fade-in that Nicholas Pegg believes makes for a "bizarre" opener, writing that "[it's as if] the listener has just arrived within earshot of something that's already started". "Breaking Glass" is a song-fragment, featuring six lines of lyrics, two of them demanding the audience "listen" and "see". The lyrics were inspired by Angie Bowie's new relationship with the drummer Roy Martin. Eno said of the track, "the feeling around was that we'd edit together ... and turn it into a more normal structure" before Alomar vetoed the idea and recommended leaving it as it was. Credited to David Bowie, Murray and Davis, Alomar recalled the trio mainly composed the song. "What in the World" was created around the beginning of the sessions and was possibly slated for inclusion on The Idiot; it features backing vocals from Pop. The song is one of the few tracks on Low to combine art rock with more straightforward pop. According to Pegg, it features a "wall of synthesiser bleeps against a barrage of guitar sound [and] distorted percussion effects". The lyrics describe a little girl who is stuck in her room.

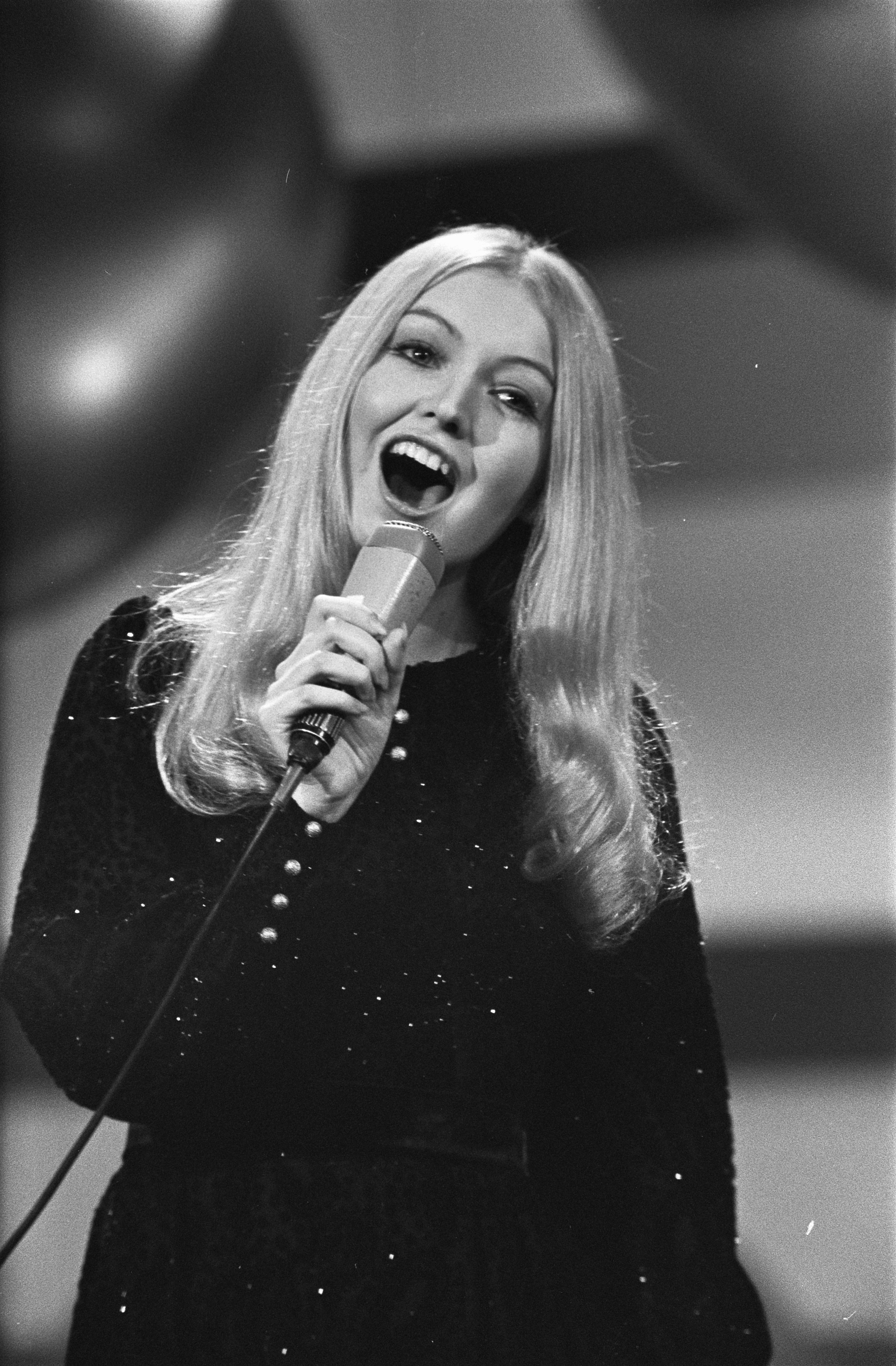
"Sound and Vision" contains backing vocals from Visconti's then-wife Mary Hopkin (pictured in 1970).

"Sound and Vision" contains wordless backing vocals from Hopkin, which she recorded before there were lyrics, a title or a melody. Bowie's vocals take a full 1 minute and 30 seconds to appear; Eno insisted on this to "confound listener expectations". Described by Bowie as his "ultimate retreat song", the lyrics reflect his mental state following his long period of drug addiction. They provide a stark contrast to the music itself, which is more joyous and upbeat. Buckley writes that the track is the closest to a "conventional pop song" on the album. The lyrics of "Always Crashing in the Same Car" reference an incident when Bowie kept ramming his car into that of a drug dealer who was ripping him off in Los Angeles. In a broader context, the lyrics are a metaphor for making the same mistake repeatedly and Bowie's obsessive need to travel and change his lifestyle. O'Leary calls the song "the depression in the middle of the 'manic' side". Seabrook considers it the only song on side one that has a definite beginning and end.

Bowie described his lyrics to "Be My Wife" as "genuinely anguished, I think". They reflect Bowie's feelings of loneliness, his inability to settle, and constitute a plea for human connections. Several biographers have suggested the lyrics allude to Bowie's failing marriage. Musically, the track is led by a "barrelling bar-room piano", played by Young. Wilcken writes that "Always Crashing in the Same Car" and "Be My Wife" are the only tracks on Low that have more conventional song structures. "A New Career in a New Town" is an instrumental that acts as a musical transition. It begins as an electronic piece, before moving into a more rock-style tune enhanced by a harmonica solo from Bowie. Doggett and O'Leary describe the solo as reminiscent of blues music. The title reflects Bowie's upcoming move to Berlin.

=== Side two ===
"Warszawa"
"Warszawa", like the other tracks on side two, is an instrumental that evokes feelings of desolation through ambient music.

"Warszawa", the opening track of what O'Leary calls Low's "night" side, is named after the Polish city of Warsaw, which Bowie visited in April 1976. He found the landscape to be desolate and wanted to capture this through music. Eno mostly composed the song. He heard Visconti's four-year-old son playing A, B, C in a constant loop on the studio piano and used this phrase to create the main theme. The piece is haunting, featuring wordless vocals from Bowie that Doggett describes as reminiscent of a "monkish vocal chorale". Buckley calls it the "most startling" piece on the album. In 1977, Bowie said that "Art Decade", a pun on "art decayed", is about West Berlin, "a city cut off from its world, art and culture, dying with no hope of retribution". Heavily influenced by Eno's ambient work, the piece paints visual impressions and evokes feelings of melancholy and beauty. O'Leary writes that for a time, the piece was co-credited to Eno. Hansa's engineer Eduard Meyer played cello on the track.

Bowie played every instrument on "Weeping Wall". Influenced by the minimalist composer Steve Reich, the main melody is an adaptation of the tune "Scarborough Fair". Bowie uses synthesisers, vibraphone, xylophone and wordless vocals to create a sense of frustration and imprisonment. The piece is reportedly meant to evoke the pain and misery caused by the Berlin Wall. Bowie described "Subterraneans" as a portrait of "the people who got caught in East Berlin after the separation, hence the faint jazz saxophones representing the memory of what it was". Originally recorded for the aborted The Man Who Fell to Earth soundtrack, the piece contains wordless vocals similar to "Warszawa". The track features contributions from J. Peter Robinson and Paul Buckmaster—credited as "Peter and Paul"—who played piano and ARP synthesiser, which were recorded during the original soundtrack sessions.

== Artwork and release ==
George Underwood, Bowie's school friend, designed Low's cover artwork. Similar to the artwork for Station to Station, it features an altered still frame from The Man Who Fell to Earth. Bowie is seen in profile as his character from the film, Thomas Jerome Newton, wearing a duffel coat set against an orange background. His hair is the same colour as the background, which Wilcken says "underlines the solipsistic notion of place reflecting person, object and subject melding into one". Wilcken notes that as The Man Who Fell to Earth was out of theatres by the time of Low's release, the design choice was not to promote the film, but to show the connection between it and the album. Buckley writes that the cover was a visual pun, meaning 'low profile'; many did not understand the joke until Bowie pointed it out in a later interview.

Bowie's previous albums, Young Americans and Station to Station, were massive commercial successes. RCA Records was eager to have another best-seller from the artist but, on hearing Low, label staff were shocked. In a letter to Bowie, RCA rejected the album and urged him to make a record more like Young Americans. Bowie kept the rejection letter on his wall at home. His former manager, Tony Defries, also tried preventing its release due to his royalty settlement in the artist's fortunes following their acrimonious 1975 split. After Bowie refused to make any changes, RCA delayed Low from its original planned release date in November 1976. According to Seabrook, the label's executives considered the album to be "distinctly unpalatable" for the Christmas market.

=== Commercial performance ===
RCA eventually released Low on 14 January 1977—less than a week after Bowie's 30th birthday—with the catalogue number PL 12030. The album received little to no promotion from both RCA or Bowie, who felt it was his "least commercial" record to that point. He opted to tour as Iggy Pop's keyboardist instead. Low became a commercial success, entering the UK Albums Chart at number 37 before peaking at number two the following week; Slim Whitman's Red River Valley kept the album from the top spot. It remained on the chart for 30 weeks. In the US, Low entered the Billboard Top LPs & Tape chart at number 82, peaking at number 11 four weeks later and remaining on the chart for 20 weeks. Elsewhere, Low reached number 6 in the Netherlands, 10 in Australia and Norway, 12 in New Zealand and Sweden, 17 in Austria, 30 in Finland, 35 in Japan and 56 in Canada.

=== Singles ===
"Sound and Vision" was released as the first single on 11 February 1977, with the instrumental "A New Career in a New Town" as the B-side. It reached number three on the UK Singles Chart, becoming Bowie's highest charting new single in the UK since "Sorrow" in 1973. The song did not fare so well in the US, peaking at number 69 on the Billboard Hot 100 and signalling Bowie's commercial downturn in the country until 1983. Although Bowie did not promote it, Pegg writes the single was an "instant turntable favourite" and was bolstered by the BBC's usage for television commercials. The single's UK success confused RCA executives. Bowie intimidated the label and persuaded RCA to release Pop's The Idiot in March 1977.

"Be My Wife" was released as the second single on 17 June 1977, backed by the instrumental "Speed of Life". It became Bowie's first single that failed to chart since his pre-Ziggy Stardust days (1972). Despite this, a music video—his first since 1973—promoted the song. An extended version of "Breaking Glass" was released as a single in Australia and New Zealand in November 1978. The single edit was created by splicing in a repeated verse of the original album recording. This rare version was made available for the first time in 2017 on Re:Call 3, part of the A New Career in a New Town (1977–1982) compilation.

== Critical reception ==
Upon release, Low divided critical opinion. Rolling Stone's John Milward said that "Bowie lacks the self-assured humour to pull off his avant-garde aspirations" and found the album's second side weaker than its first, due to the band inflicting "discipline into Bowie's writing and performance". Another reviewer, Dave Marsh, gave Low two stars out of five, finding a lack of "thought" and "real songs", calling the majority of side two "as limpid as the worst movie soundtrack". He ultimately found the record a new low point for the artist. A reviewer for Record Mirror found the album boring at first listen, and upon repeated listens, felt Bowie had hit an "all time low", releasing an album that lacks a "genuine vision" with incohesive music and few lyrics. NME's Charles Shaar Murray gave the album an extremely negative assessment, describing it as "a state of mind beyond desperation". He felt that the record encouraged the listener to feel down and offered no help in getting back up, stating, "It's an act of purest hatred and destructiveness. It comes to us in a bad time and it doesn't help at all." Murray ultimately asked, "Who needs this shit?"

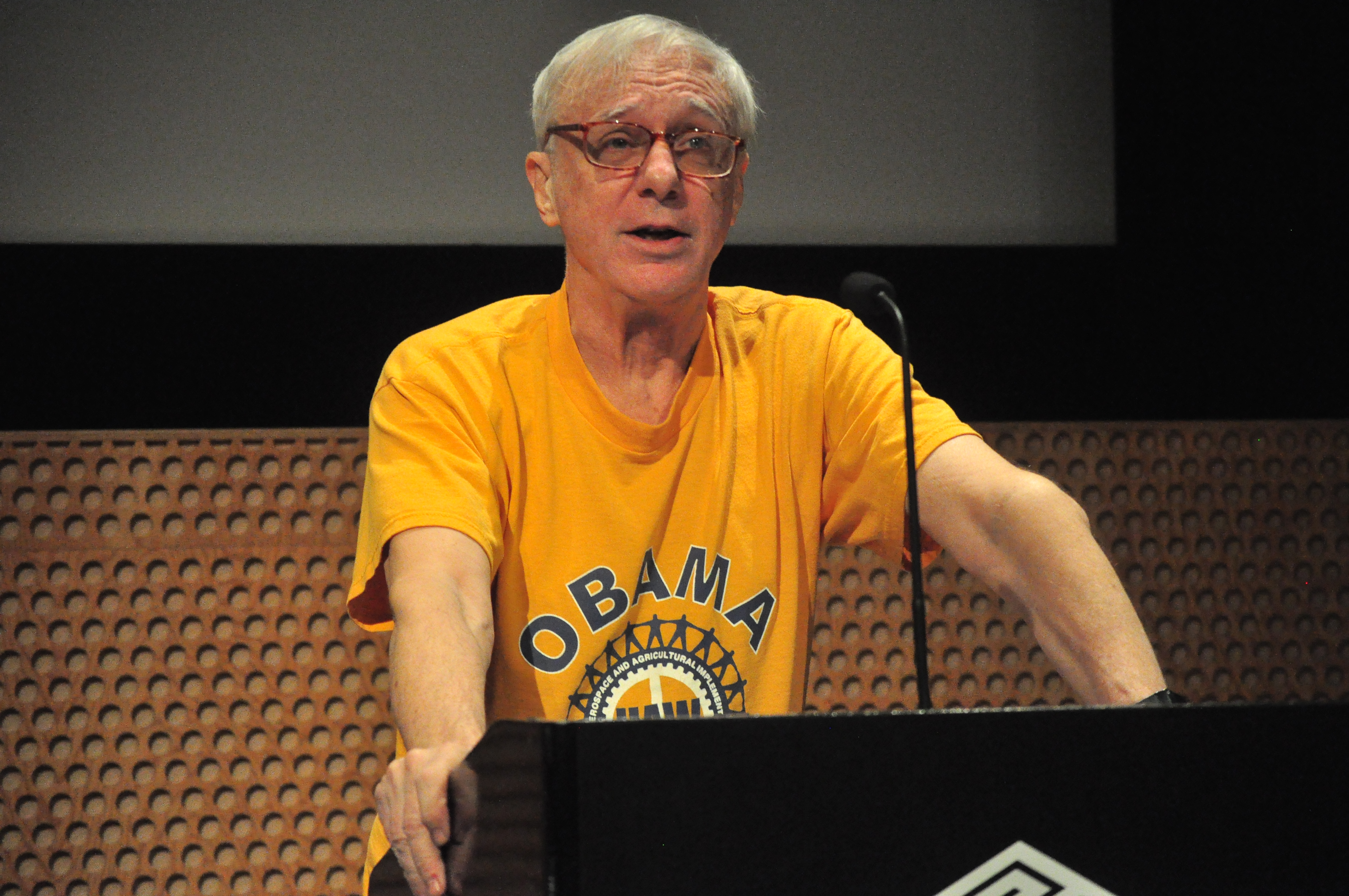
Music critic Robert Christgau (pictured in 2014) initially gave Low a mixed assessment, but revised his opinion after the release of "Heroes" later that year, including Low on his list of the best albums of 1977.

In The Village Voice, Robert Christgau found side one's seven "fragments" to be "almost as powerful as the 'overlong' tracks on Station to Station", but described "the movie music on side two" as banal. He revised his opinion on the second side after the release of "Heroes", writing that Low "now seems quite pop, slick and to the point even when the point is background noise". Los Angeles Times critic Robert Hilburn found some of the album "striking" and "satisfying" as Ziggy but felt the rest lacked mass appeal. Robin Denslow agreed, calling Low Bowie's "least commercial" but "most experimental" work yet in The Guardian.

Other reviewers praised the record. NME's Ian MacDonald found Low "stunningly beautiful [...] the sound of Sinatra reproduced by Martian computers". He considered it a conceptual sequel to Station to Station and concluded that Low is "the ONLY contemporary rock album". Michael Watts of Melody Maker called it "the music of Now", praising the album as feeling "right for the times", despite its lack of popularity. A reviewer for Billboard described the second side as "adventurous" with an appeal that was as yet uncertain, while Canadian critic Dale Winnitowy found Low "hideously interesting". Though John Rockwell of The New York Times called the lyrics "mindless" and described the instruments as "strange and spacey", he found the album "alluringly beautiful" and "one of the finest disks of his career." Sounds magazine's Tim Lott considered Low both Bowie and Eno's best work thus far and a "mechanical classic".

Bowie's musical direction perplexed some reviewers. Rockwell felt that Bowie's fans would find Low was his finest work after they overcame their shock at hearing it for the first time. In National RockStar, David Hancock was surprised the record was Bowie's, calling it "his most bizarre and adventurous LP". Kris Needs in ZigZag described Low as strange and shocking but believed it was one of Bowie's greatest achievements. Phonograph Record's Bud Scoppa felt the album made little sense. He found it "the most intimate and free recording this extraordinary artist has yet made", and believed listeners would be "baffled" by it or "give in" to it. In lists compiling the best albums of the year, Low placed at number 15 by Sounds and number 27 by NME. In The Village Voice's annual Pazz & Jop poll compiling the year's best albums, Low placed at number 26.

== Subsequent events ==
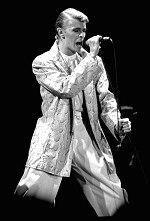
Bowie (pictured in 1978) performed songs from Low on the Isolar II tour in 1978.

Against RCA's wishes, Bowie declined to tour Low and instead supported Pop on his own tour to promote The Idiot. Bowie was adamant about not taking the spotlight away from Pop, often staying behind his keyboards and not addressing the audience. The tour ran from March to mid-April 1977. At the end of the tour, Bowie and Pop returned to Hansa by the Wall in West Berlin to record Pop's second studio album Lust for Life (1977). Bowie played a more minor role compared to The Idiot, allowing Pop to compose his own arrangements for the tracks, resulting in a sound more reminiscent of Pop's earlier work. Recording was completed in two and a half weeks from May to June 1977. Although Bowie had told interviewers in 1978 he planned to do a third collaboration with Pop, the album was their last official collaboration until the mid-1980s.

Following Lust for Life, Bowie recorded Low's follow-up, "Heroes", at Hansa by the Wall from July to August 1977. Developing the material found on Low, the songs on "Heroes" have been described as more positive in tone and more atmosphere than those of its predecessor. The albums are similarly structured, side one featuring more conventional tracks and side two mainly featuring instrumentals. Eno played a much greater role on "Heroes" than on Low, being credited as co-author of four of the ten tracks. Bowie toured both albums on the Isolar II world tour, also known as "the Stage tour", from March to December 1978.

== Influence and legacy ==
Bowie took the icy, arty electronics of Kraftwerk and brought them to a comparatively mainstream audience...[T]here isn't a note on Low that's aged since it dropped in 1977. It's not a timeless record—it seems to exist almost entirely apart from time. His greatest artistic achievement, Low's impact wouldn't be fully felt for a generation—it wasn't until Radiohead's Kid A that rock and electronic would once again meet and move forward in such a mature fashion.

— Joe Lynch, Billboard, 2016

In the decades since its release, Low has been acclaimed for its originality and cited as an influence on the post-punk genre. Susie Goldring of BBC Music wrote: "Without Low, we'd have no Joy Division, no Human League, no Cabaret Voltaire, and I bet, no Arcade Fire. The legacy of Low lives on." Spitz also acknowledges the influence of the album on post-punk, naming Joy Division, Magazine, Gang of Four and Wire as bands influenced by Low's "odd anti-aggression and unapologetic, almost metaphorical use of synthesised music". The music journalist Simon Reynolds said: "I think it's Low's inhibition and repression that Joy Division and others responded to. The fact that the music, while guitar-based and harsh and aggressive, never rocks out. It's imploded aggression." James E. Perone suggested that both "What in the World" and "Be My Wife" foreshadowed the punk/new wave sound of English band the Stranglers, particularly their 1977 releases Rattus Norvegicus and No More Heroes.

In the second edition of his book All Time Top 1000 Albums (1998), Colin Larkin cites Gary Numan, Ultravox and Orchestral Manoeuvres in the Dark as artists influenced by Low. Wilcken finds Radiohead's album Kid A (2000), particularly the track "Treefingers", to reflect a similar influence. William Doyle of The Quietus wrote that before the release of Kid A, Bowie created the blueprint "reinvention" album with Low, a record from an artist at the peak of their popularity that confounded his fans' expectations. Bjorn Randolph of Stylus Magazine felt the album had a crucial influence on the post-rock genre that came to prominence among underground musicians nearly two decades after Low's release. Doggett writes that, like Station to Station before it, Low established Bowie as an artist who was "impossible to second-guess". He found Bowie's five-year progression from Hunky Dory to Low daring and courageous.

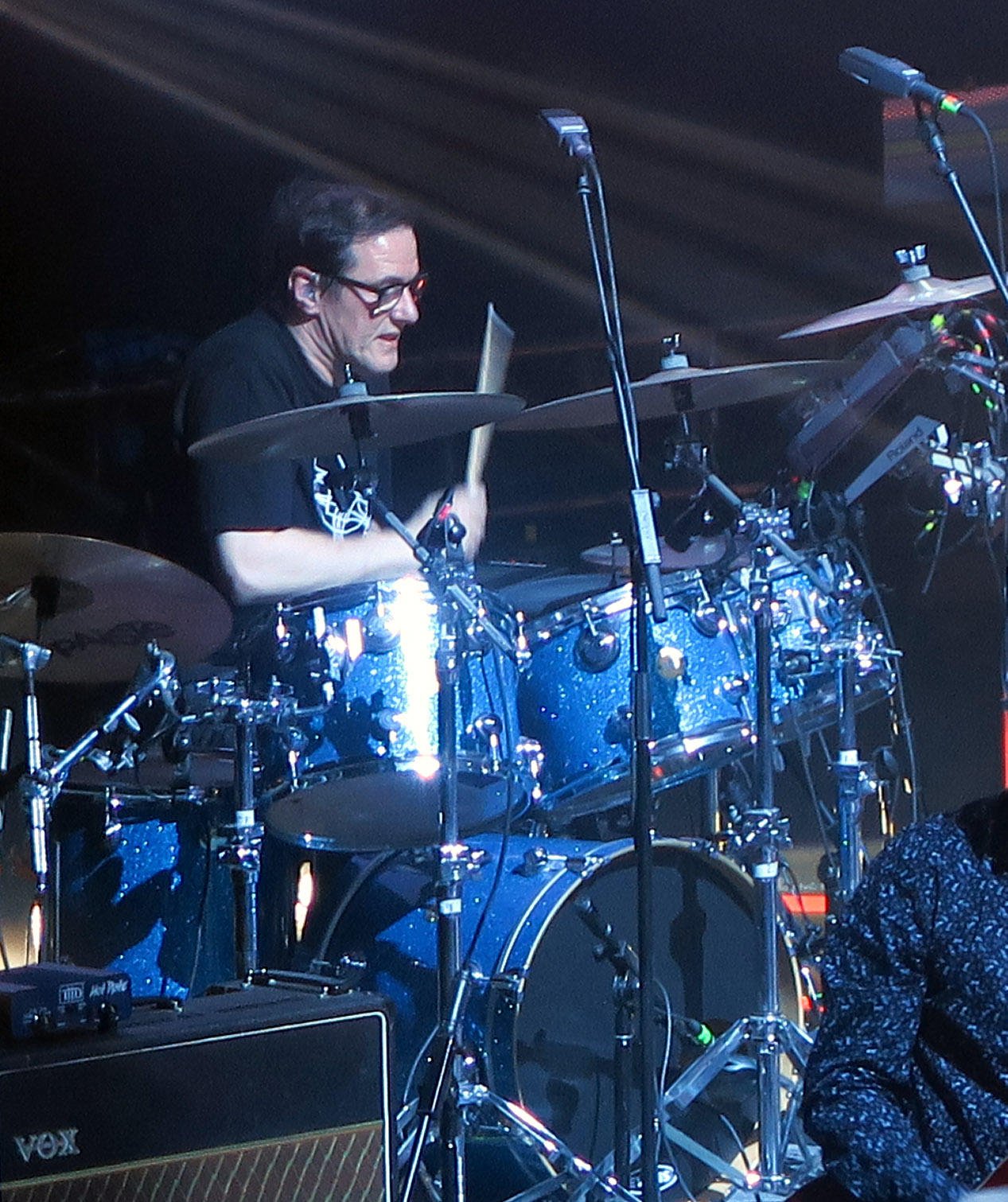
Joy Division drummer Stephen Morris in 2019. Joy Division cited Low as an influence.

Bowie's biographers have highlighted the influence the album had on Joy Division, as have the band themselves; their original name was "Warsaw", a reference to "Warszawa". Wilcken says that Joy Division imitate the "split mentality" of Low on their final album Closer (1980), a record which contains progressively darker track sequencing. Joy Division's drummer Stephen Morris told Uncut magazine in 2001 that when making their 1978 An Ideal for Living EP, the band asked the engineer to make the drums sound like "Speed of Life"; "Strangely enough he couldn't." Like Morris, many musicians, producers and engineers tried to imitate Low's drum sound. Visconti refused to explain how he crafted it, instead asking them how they thought it had been done. Approximations began appearing throughout the rest of the 1970s and, by the 1980s, were found on almost every record on the charts. Seabrook credits Bowie as being indirectly responsible for the "thumping backbeat" heard on tracks ranging from Phil Collins' "In the Air Tonight" to Duran Duran's "Hungry Like the Wolf". In an interview with Musician magazine in 1983, Bowie expressed his dismay, stating, "That depressive gorilla effect was something I wish we'd never created, having had to live through four years of it with other English bands."

Many musicians have discussed the album's influence. On learning the title of the album was Low, the singer-songwriter Nick Lowe "retaliated" by naming his 1977 EP Bowi (without an "e"). Robert Smith of the English rock band the Cure listened to the record frequently while making their 1980 album Seventeen Seconds. In 1994, Trent Reznor of the American rock band Nine Inch Nails cited Low as a key inspiration for The Downward Spiral (1994), crediting its "song-writing", "mood" and "structure[s]" as influences. Dave Sitek of the American rock band TV on the Radio stated: "That particular album, that song 'Warszawa', that's when I knew music was the ultimate force, at least in my own life." Bowie worked with the band in 2003.

In 1992, the American composer and pianist Philip Glass produced a classical suite based on the album entitled "Low" Symphony, his first symphony. It consisted of three movements based on Low tracks: "Subterraneans"; "Some Are" (an outtake); and "Warszawa". The Brooklyn Philharmonic Orchestra recorded the symphony at Glass' Looking Glass Studios in New York and it was released in 1993. Speaking of the album, Glass said: "They were doing what few other people were trying to do—which was to create an art within the realm of popular music. I listened to it constantly." Of his decision to create a symphony based on the record, Glass said: "In the question of Bowie and Eno's original Low LP, to me there was no doubt that both talent and quality were evident there... . My generation was sick to death of academics telling us what was good and what wasn't." The "Low" Symphony acknowledges Eno's contributions to the original record and portraits of Bowie, Eno and Glass appear on the album cover. Bowie was flattered by the symphony and praised it, as did Pegg. Glass followed up the "Low" Symphony with classical adaptations of the other "Berlin" records with "Heroes" and Lodger in 1997 and 2019, respectively.

=== Reappraisal ===
Retrospective professional ratings
Review scores
Source	Rating
AllMusic	5/5 stars
Blender	5/5 stars
Christgau's Record Guide	B+
Encyclopedia of Popular Music	4/5 stars
NME	9/10
Pitchfork	10/10
Q	5/5 stars
Rolling Stone	5/5 stars
The Rolling Stone Album Guide	5/5 stars
Spin	4/5 stars
Spin Alternative Record Guide	9/10

Commentators continue to regard Low as one of Bowie's best works. Stephen Thomas Erlewine of AllMusic wrote that with the album, Bowie "confirmed his place at rock's cutting edge", concluding that "the record is defiantly experimental and dense with detail, providing a new direction for the avant-garde in rock & roll". Dele Fadele of NME found the record a "futuristic touchstone that still stands". In 2001, Sheffield wrote that Low contained some of the artist's best work. "[The album] flows together into a lyrical, hallucinatory, miraculously beautiful whole, the music of an overstimulated mind in an exhausted body, as rock's prettiest sex vampire sashays through some serious emotional wreckage." Sheffield concluded by noting the timelessness of the record, calling it one of Bowie's "most intense and influential" records. Goldring praised the album as "ambitious" and felt it complimented Bowie's artistic growth, the singer having turned 30 on its release. In a 2013 readers' poll for Rolling Stone, Low was voted Bowie's fourth best album. The magazine noted its underappreciation at the time of release and the recognition as a masterpiece in the ensuing decades.

Some reviewers have considered Low Bowie's greatest artistic achievement. Following Bowie's death, Bryan Wawzenek of Ultimate Classic Rock listed Low as his greatest album, writing: "Low is more than songs and sounds. The creative partnership behind the record forged a feeling, a mood, a place. Like very few of the best albums ever recorded, Low contains a universe you can inhabit, for 40 minutes at a time. It's Bowie's masterpiece." Laura Snapes of Pitchfork gave the album a 10 out of 10 rating, saying it shows Bowie succeeding in setting a new path for himself following a period of drug addiction. Snapes summarises side one as feeling like "having the carpet ripped out from under you by three wizards who have plans to fly it elsewhere". Although she believed side two's instrumentals feel "a little ponderous by today's standards", their ability to provoke imagery of different worlds is "something to behold". The album's 40th anniversary in 2017 attracted reviews. Hart noted Low contains music that sounds both of its time and before its time, shrouded with "forward-thinking artfulness" that remains unmatched in 2017, further stating that it is an album "that will make you dance, think and weep all in [...] 38 minutes." Doyle praised Low's production and its ability to "transport the listener to certain frontiers of place and thought in a very powerful way". He described Low as "a moment of pure discovery that most other records have failed to surpass", adding that the record is open to interpretation by each listener.

=== Rankings ===
Low has frequently appeared on lists of the greatest albums of all time. Ranking the 100 best albums ever made, Sounds placed it at number 35 in 1986 and The Guardian ranked it number 62 in 1997. A year later, Q readers voted it the 43rd greatest album of all time. On lists of the 100 Greatest British Albums Ever, Q and The Observer ranked Low numbers 16 and 39, respectively. In 2004, Pitchfork named it the greatest album of the 1970s; Erlewine described it as "a record that hurtles toward an undefined future while embracing ambiguity", as well as "an album about rebirth, which is why it still possesses the power to startle." Similarly, Paste included it at number 34 in their list of the 70 best albums of the 1970s, and in 2024, it was ranked number 127 on the publication's list of the 300 greatest albums of all time. Ultimate Classic Rock later featured Low in a list of the 100 best rock albums from the 1970s in 2015. In 2013, NME listed the album as the 14th greatest of all time in their list of the 500 Greatest Albums of All Time. Larkin ranked it numbers 120 and 47 in the second and third editions of All Time Top 1000 Albums, respectively. In 2003, Low was ranked number 249 on Rolling Stone's list of the 500 Greatest Albums of All Time. It was ranked number 251 in a 2012 revised list and number 206 in a 2020 revised list. In 2023, British GQ ranked it the second best electronic album of all time, behind Kraftwerk's The Man-Machine (1978).

The album was also included in the 2018 edition of Robert Dimery's book 1001 Albums You Must Hear Before You Die.

== Reissues ==
Low has been reissued several times. RCA reissued the album on vinyl in 1980 and released it on compact disc for the first time in the mid-1980s. A 1991 CD release by Rykodisc contained three bonus tracks, including a remix of "Sound and Vision" and the outtakes "Some Are" and "All Saints". EMI released the 1991 edition in the UK on CD, Cassette and LP, while it was rereleased on AU20 Gold CD. The reissue charted at number 64 on the UK Albums Chart in September 1991. A 1999 CD release by EMI, without bonus tracks, featured 24-bit digitally remastered sound. In 2017, the album was remastered for Parlophone's A New Career in a New Town (1977–1982) box set. It was released in CD, vinyl and digital formats.

== Track listing ==
All lyrics are written by David Bowie; all music is composed by Bowie, except where noted.

Side one
No.	Title	Music	Length
1.	"Speed of Life"		2:46
2.	"Breaking Glass"	Bowie, Dennis Davis, George Murray	1:51
3.	"What in the World"		2:23
4.	"Sound and Vision"		3:03
5.	"Always Crashing in the Same Car"		3:29
6.	"Be My Wife"		2:55
7.	"A New Career in a New Town"		2:51
Total length:			19:18

Side two
No.	Title	Music	Length
1.	"Warszawa"	Bowie, Brian Eno	6:20
2.	"Art Decade"		3:43
3.	"Weeping Wall"		3:26
4.	"Subterraneans"		5:39
Total length:			19:08

== Personnel ==
Personnel per the album's liner notes and the biographer Nicholas Pegg. Track numbers noted in parentheses below are based on the CD track numbering of the 1991 reissue.

- David Bowie – vocals (2–6, 8, 10–11), saxophones (4, 11), guitar (6, 9–11), pump bass (6), harmonica (7), vibraphone (9–10), xylophone (10), pre-arranged percussion (9), keyboards: ARP synthesiser (1, 10–11), Chamberlin: Credited as "tape horn and brass" (1), "synthetic strings" (1, 4, 9–10), "tape cellos" (5) and "tape sax section" (7), piano (7, 9–11)
- Brian Eno – keyboards: Minimoog (2, 8–9), ARP (3, 11), EMS Synthi AKS (listed as "E.M.I.") (3, 5), piano (7–9, 11), Chamberlin (8–9), other synthesisers, vocals (4), guitar treatments (5), synthetics (7)
- Carlos Alomar – rhythm guitars (1, 3–7), lead guitar (1, 2), guitar (11)
- Dennis Davis – percussion (1–7)
- George Murray – bass (1–7, 11)
- Ricky Gardiner – rhythm guitar (2), lead guitar (3–7)
- Roy Young – piano (1, 3–7), Farfisa organ (3, 5)

Additional musicians

- Iggy Pop – backing vocals (3)
- Mary Visconti – backing vocals (4)
- Eduard Meyer – cellos (9)
- Peter and Paul (a.k.a. J. Peter Robinson and Paul Buckmaster, who had worked with Bowie on The Man Who Fell to Earth soundtrack) – pianos and ARP (11)

Technical

- David Bowie – producer
- Tony Visconti – producer
- David Richards – mixing
- Jonathan Wyner – assistant engineer

== Charts and certifications ==
=== Weekly charts ===
1977 weekly chart performance for Low
Chart (1977)	Peak position
Australian Albums (Kent Music Report)	10
Austrian Albums (Ö3 Austria)	17
Canadian Albums (RPM)	56
Dutch Albums (MegaCharts)	6
Finnish Albums (Suomen virallinen lista)	30
Japanese Albums (Oricon)	35
New Zealand Albums (RIANZ)	12
Norwegian Albums (VG-lista)	10
Swedish Albums (Sverigetopplistan)	12
UK Albums (Official Charts)	2
US Billboard Top LPs & Tape	11

1991 weekly chart performance for Low
Chart (1991)	Peak position
UK Albums (OCC)	64

2016 weekly chart performance for Low
Chart (2016)	Peak position
Austrian Albums (Ö3 Austria)	16
French Albums (SNEP)	80
Irish Albums (IRMA)	72
Italian Albums (FIMI)	52
Swiss Albums (Schweizer Hitparade)	40

2018 weekly chart performance for Low
Chart (2018 reissue)	Peak position
Greek Albums (IFPI)	44
Hungarian Albums (MAHASZ)	36
Scottish Albums (OCC)	14
Spanish Albums (Promusicae)	89
UK Albums (OCC)	50

=== Year-end charts ===
1977 year-end chart performance for Low
Chart (1977)	Position
Australian Albums (Kent Music Report)	70
Dutch Albums (MegaCharts)	19
UK Albums (OCC)	40

=== Certifications ===
Sales and certifications for Low
Region	Certification	Certified units/sales
Canada (Music Canada)	Gold	50,000^{^}
Netherlands	—	30,000
United Kingdom (BPI)	Gold	220,000
Summaries
Worldwide	—	2,300,000
^{^} Shipments figures based on certification alone.
