= Eventide, Inc =

American audio equipment manufacturer

Eventide Inc.
- Type: Private
- Founded: 1971
- Headquarters: Little Ferry, New Jersey
- Key people: Richard Factor, Co-founder and Chairman; Orville Greene, Co-founder; Steve Katz, Co-founder; Anthony Agnello, Managing Director; Richard Van Tieghem, President, Communications Division
- Products: Audio Signal Processing, effects pedals, audio plugins, broadcast profanity delays, and communications recording equipment and software
- Website: www.eventide.com

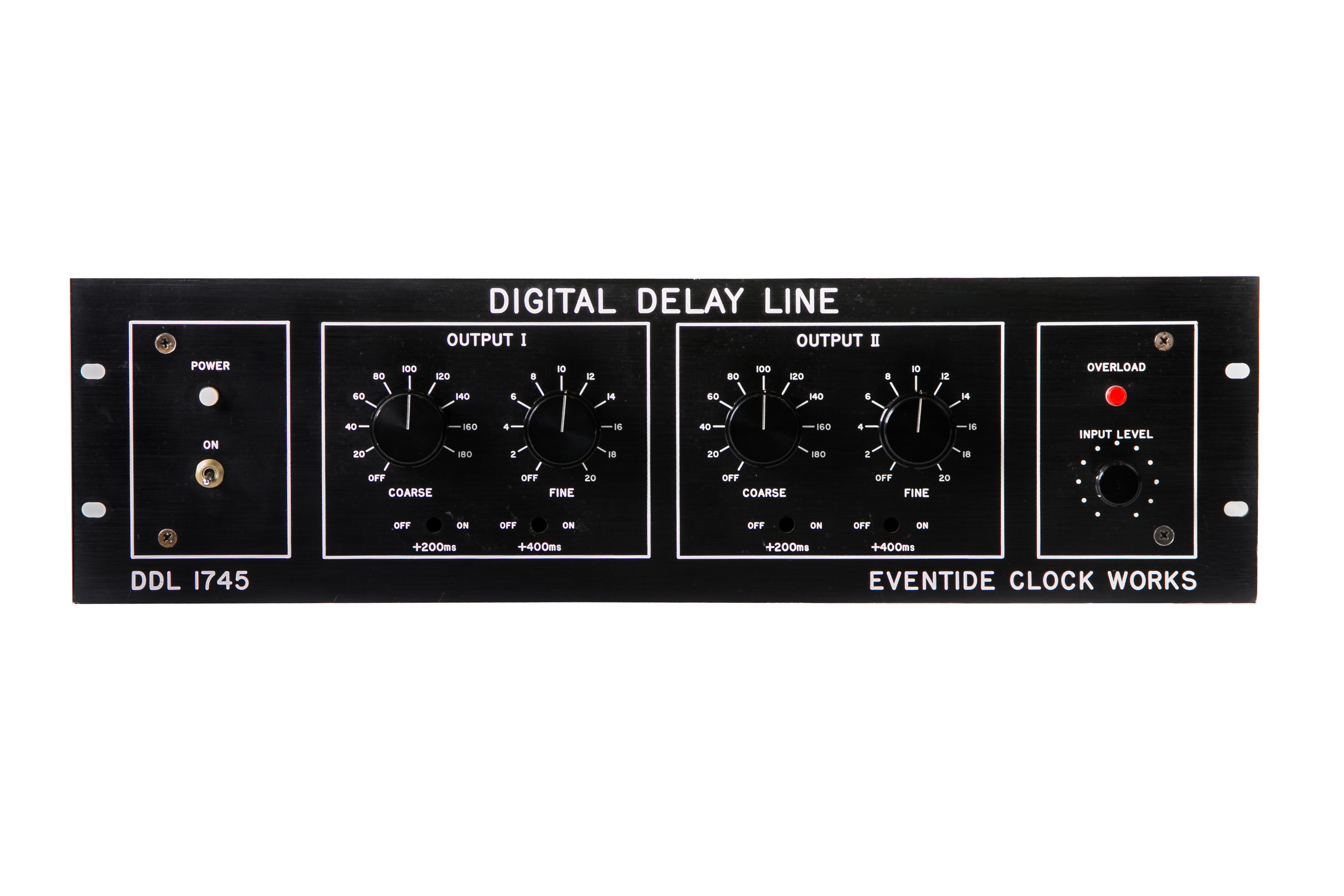
Eventide DDL 1745 Digital Delay Line Studio Processor

Eventide Inc. (also known earlier as Eventide Clock Works Inc.) is an American pro audio, broadcast and communications company whose audio division manufactures digital effects processors, digital signal processor (DSP) software, and guitar effects pedals. Eventide was one of the first companies to manufacture digital audio processors, and its products are mainstays in sound recording and reproduction, post production, and broadcast studios.

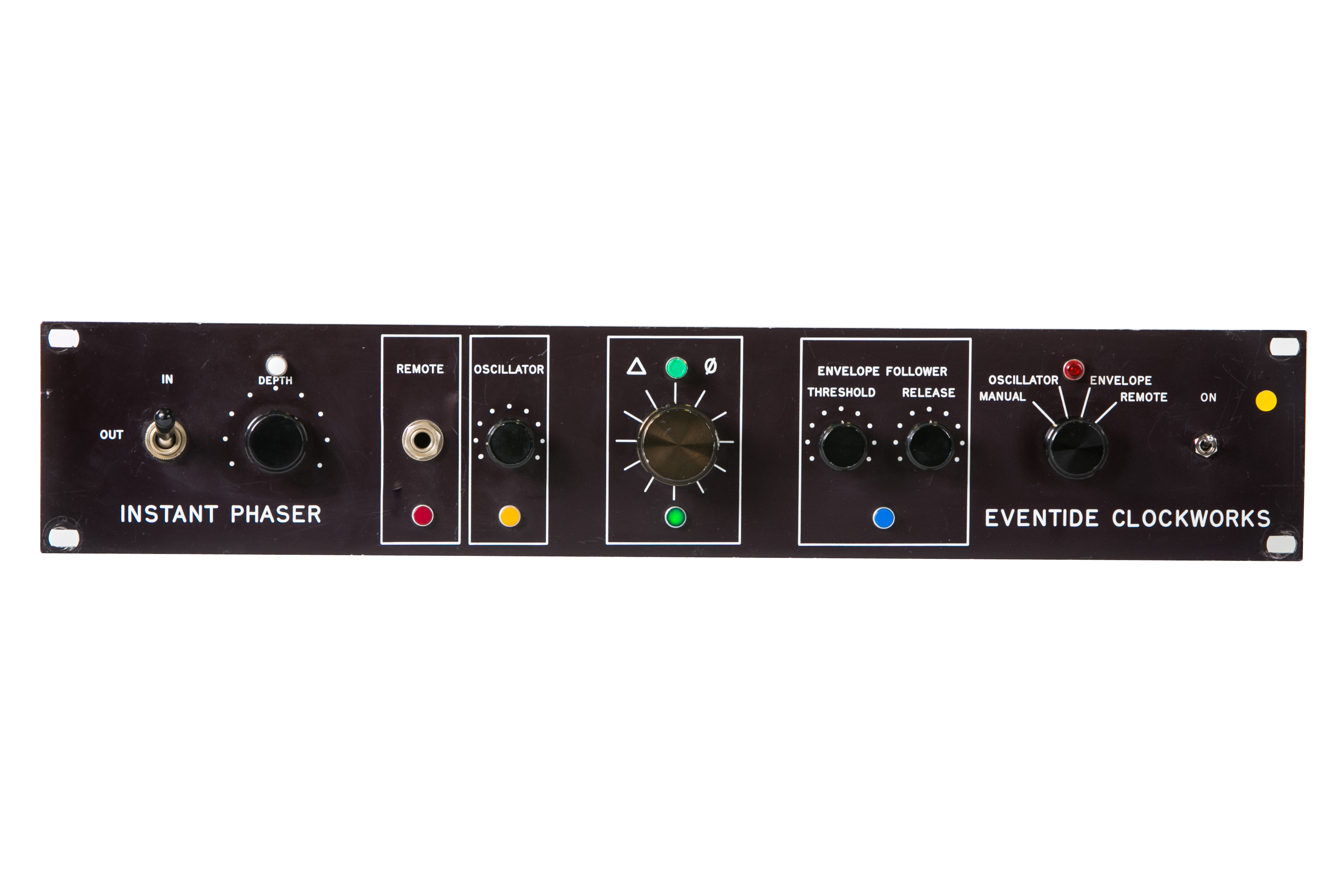
Eventide Instant Phaser

== Beginnings ==
Eventide was founded in 1971 by recording engineer Stephen Katz, inventor Richard Factor, and businessman/patent attorney Orville Greene. The business was founded in the basement of the Sound Exchange, a recording studio located at 265 West 54th Street in New York City, which was owned by Greene. Because the studio lacked space for a tape op, Katz asked Factor to build a device to rewind the analog tape on their Ampex MM1000 multitrack recorder to specific points and the resulting device turned into an original equipment manufacturer success for Ampex. Other early products included a two-second delay for telephone research and an electrostatic deflector for dispensing nanoliter quantities of chemical reagents.

Eventide's original product line consisted of two products: the Instant Phaser, which was the result of an Audio Engineering Society Show appearance and a response to tape-based flanging), and what would eventually become the 1745 Digital Delay Line which was the result of a significant order from Maryland Public Broadcasting and the world's first digital professional audio device.

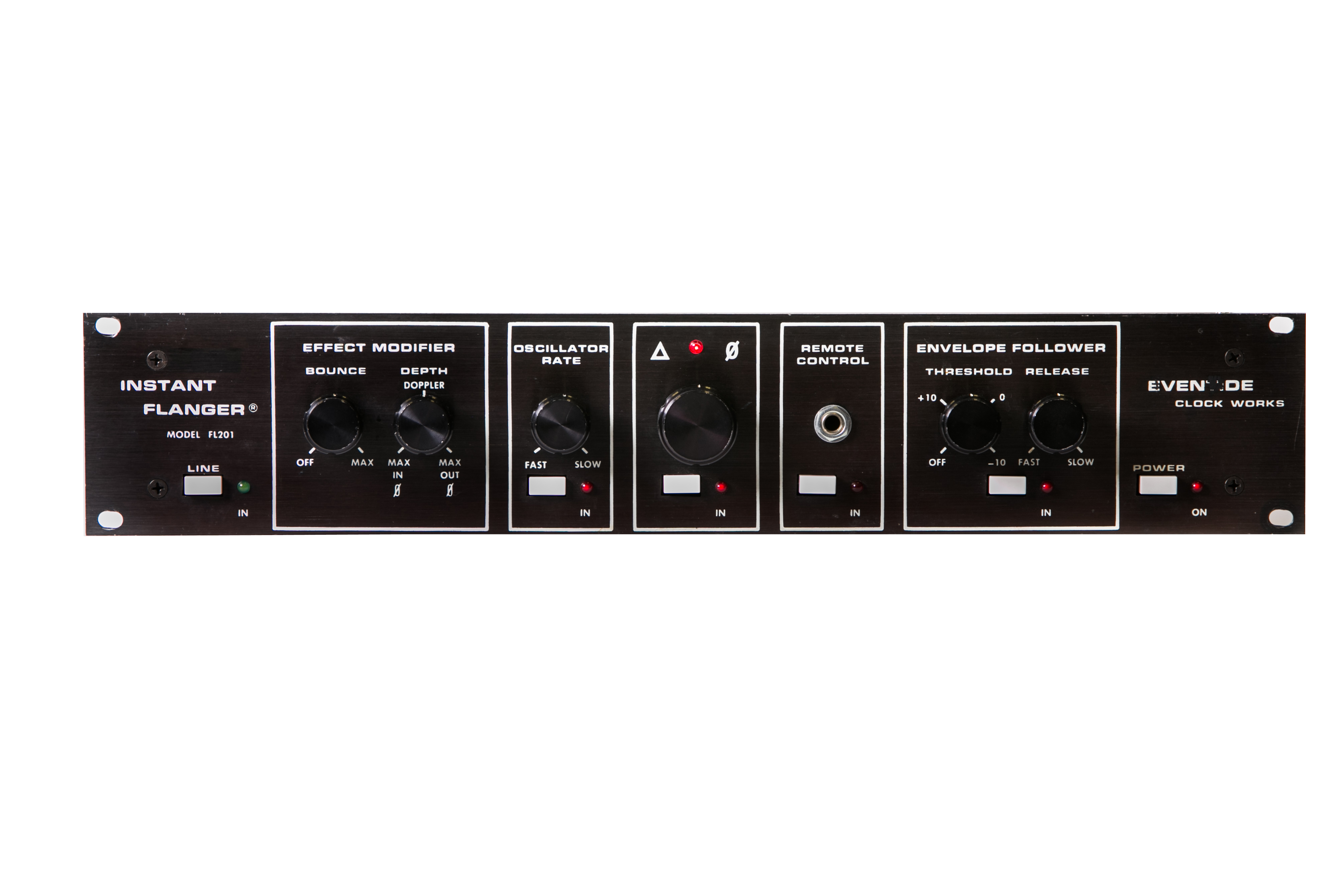
Eventide Instant Flanger

Beginning with the 1745M, Eventide began using random-access memory (RAM) chips in many of their products. After purchasing a Hewlett-Packard computer for researching reverb algorithms, the computer required a memory upgrade to handle the necessary computations. As a result, Eventide designers realized that they could manufacture computer memory expansion far more affordably than the current market price. Eventide subsequently began to manufacture and sell HP-compatible RAM expansion boards, doing so from the late 1970s to the mid-1990s.

In 2017, Co-founder and chairman Richard Factor was interviewed about Eventide's history on the Gear Club podcast in episodes 6 and 7.

== Aviation ==
Shortly after Eventide moved its offices from Manhattan to New Jersey, Eventide developed Argus, the first moving map system, and one of the first multi-function displays designed for general aviation use.

== Digital voice logging and recording ==
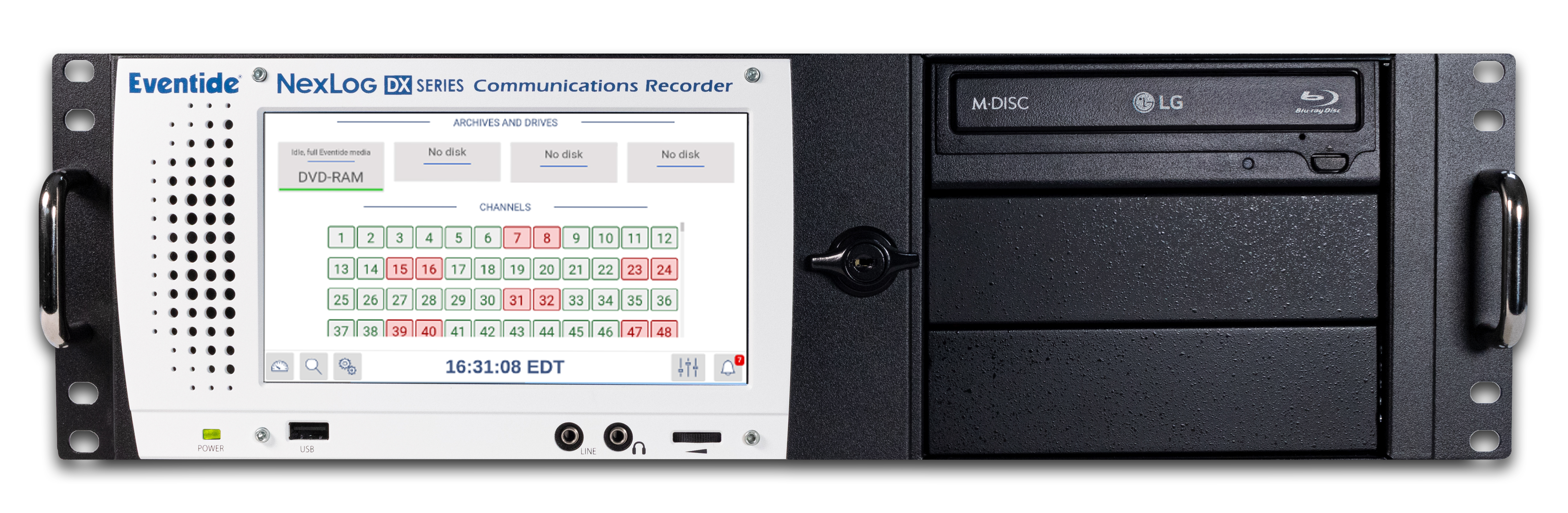
NexLog DX-Series Recorder

In the early 1990s, Eventide developed digital voice logging recorders that enabled broadcasters, police, 911 centers and utilities to begin digitally archiving with improved audio quality and far greater storage capabilities than previously available. Eventide's early recorder models (VR240, VR320, DiR-911T, VR615, VR725 and VR778) were installed worldwide.

In 2012, Eventide introduced its NexLog Communications Recorders for P25, NG911, public safety, utilities, and air traffic control facilities.

In 2020, Eventide introduced its NexLog DX-Series Communications Recording Solutions, which added support for virtualization, increased the maximum channel capacity to 540 per unit; adding full HTML5-based monitoring and replay of voice, PC screens, imagery, video and data.

== H910 Harmonizer ==
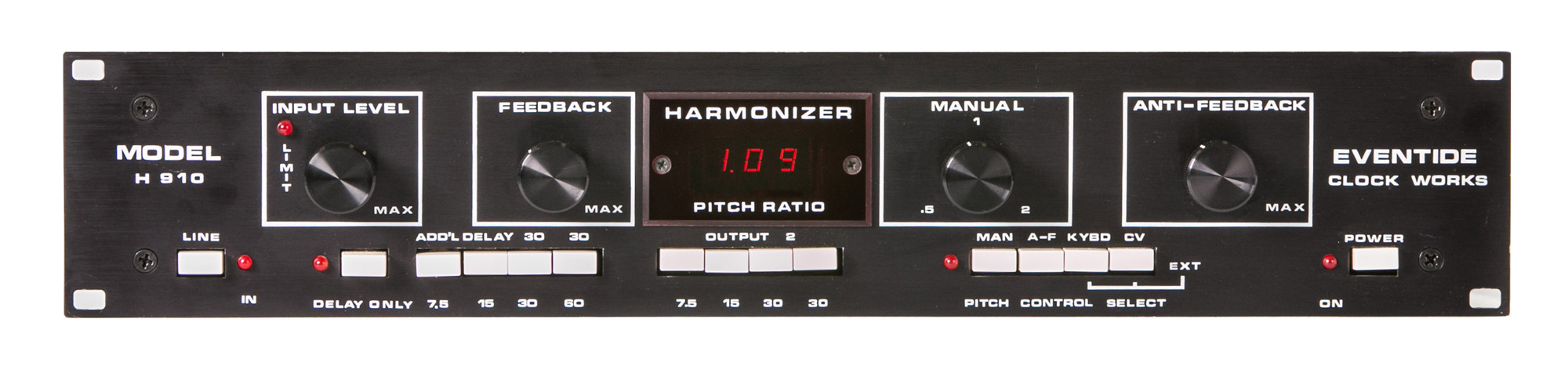
H910 Harmonizer

The Eventide H910 Harmonizer was first demonstrated to universally positive reactions at the Audio Engineering Society show in late 1974. It was designed by Eventide's first engineer, Tony Agnello, who later went on to become the president of Eventide's audio division. The pre-production prototype was a hand-wired box topped with a music keyboard controller which was later developed into the HK 941 model. Jon Anderson of the band Yes was among those impressed and became a tester for the first prototype. The production H910 was released in 1975, offering pitch shifting (±1 octave), delay (up to 112.5 ms), feedback regeneration and other features in an easy-to-use box that sold for $1,600. The H910 model number refers to the Beatles song "One After 909".

The first H910 customer was New York City's Channel 5, utilizing it to downward pitch shift I Love Lucy reruns that were sped up to create room to run more advertisements. Speeding up the reruns had increased the pitch of the audio, and the H910 was able to shift that pitch back to where it originally had been. Frank Zappa and Jimmy Page added the H910 to their guitar processing rigs. Producer Tony Visconti used the H910 to create the snare sound on David Bowie's album Low (1977), as did Tony Platt on AC/DC's song "Back in Black" (1980). Chuck Hammer in 1979 used it as an integral part of his Guitar Synth rig on tour with Lou Reed and again in 1980 with David Bowie. Another popular application was to use two H910s slightly detuned with a small delay. Notable users of this twin Harmonizer effect included Eddie Van Halen, who used it for his trademark guitar sound, and Tom Lord-Alge, who used it for the vocals on the hit Steve Winwood song "Back in the High Life Again" (1986). Recognizing the popularity of this application, Eventide recreated it with the Dual 910 program in the H3000 UltraHarmonizer released in the late 1980s. The H910 was also one of Eventide's first devices to enter the world of film, and was used on the voice of R2-D2 in Star Wars. Brian Eno used the H3000 Ultraharmonizer in his work with U2. Eno wrote to Eventide saying it was "best-designed and most enjoyable" equipment he had ever owned.

The H910 Harmonizer was recognized by the AES with a TECnology Hall of Fame award in 2007. On November 10, 1976, Eventide filed a trademark registration for "Harmonizer" and continues to maintain its rights to the Harmonizer trademark today.

== Timeline of noteworthy products ==
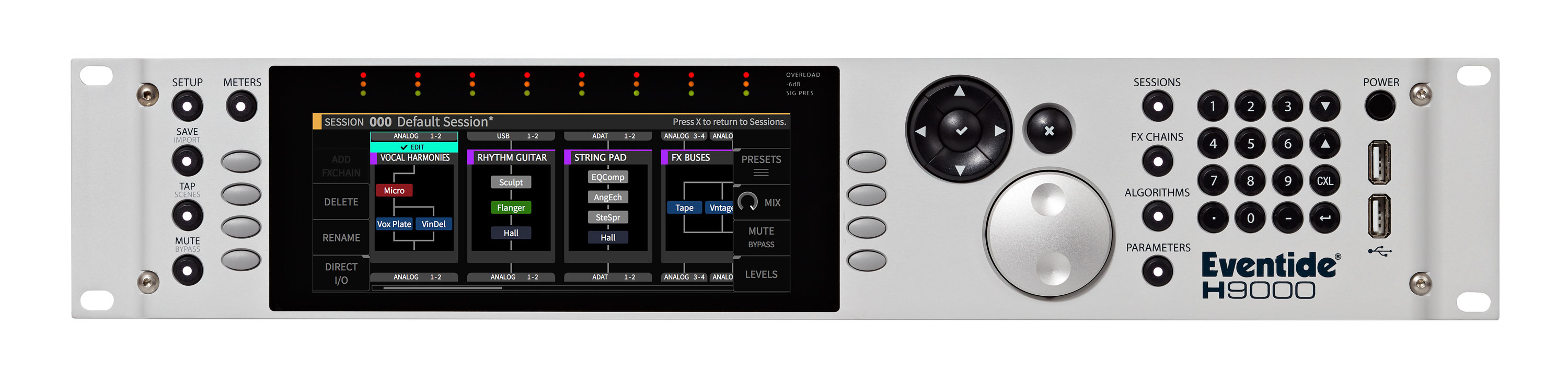
Eventide H9000 Harmonizer Effects Processor

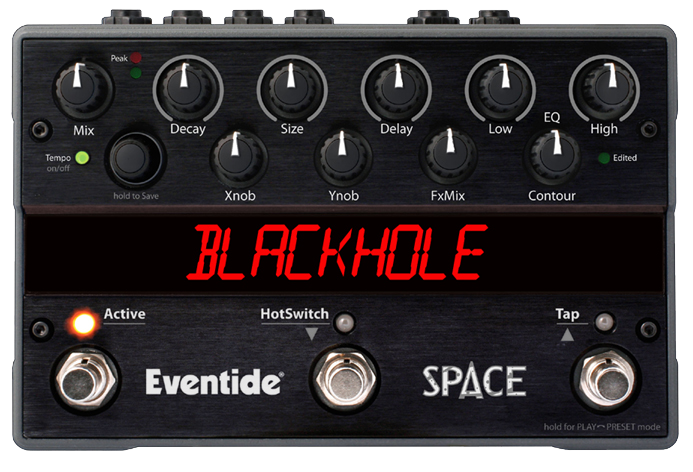
Eventide Space Reverb & Beyond Stompbox

- PS 101 Instant Phaser (1971) - The first studio phaser, and pro audio's first rack mount effects unit. Used on classic songs such as Led Zeppelin's "Kashmir." Used analog all-pass filters to phase shift.
- 1745 Digital Delay Line (1971) - First digital pro audio device. Two channels of independent delay from a single input, with the delays ranging from 0 to 200 milliseconds. First used at the 1973 Summer Jam at Watkins Glen. Inducted into the TECnology Hall of Fame in 2018.
- DDL 1745A (1973) - Modification of 1745 DDL with easier with more user-friendly shift registers
- Omnipressor (1974) - First dynamics effects processor with a wide range of functions beyond compression and limiting as they were known. Innovated dynamic reversal and infinite compression, and was the first device to implement side-chain compression.
- DDL 1745M (1975) - Another variant of the original 1745, replacing shift registers with Random Access Memory (RAM) which allowed for finer resolution delay. This version was one of the first uses of RAM in an audio product, and also had an optional pitch change module, one of the first products of this kind with a frequency response suitable for music.
- Instant Flanger (1975) - One of the first pro audio flanger devices to authentically simulate tape flanging. Used bucket brigade chips to achieve the short delays necessary for flanging.
- H910 Harmonizer (1975) - First commercially available pitch changer and first digital multi-effects processor.
- BD955 (1977) - "Obscenity Delay" allowed broadcasters sufficient delay to delete any objectionable content (like from a live telephone caller on a radio show) with no apparent interruption to the program. It was the successor to a custom 1 1/4 second delay built for WPLJ NY 95.5 which was the first electronic delay for broadcast. Later ABC also commissioned a five-minute custom delay used to delay the radio network news.
- H949 Harmonizer (1979) - Harmonizer with finely controllable pitch change capability. Used for doubling vocals and had "de-glitch" option for greatly reducing objectionable artifacts in harmonized audio.
- SP2016 (1982) - Early Digital Reverb processor utilizing DSP and first effects device to publish its SDK so that 3rd party developers could develop plug-in algorithms.
- H3000 (1986) - First intelligent/diatonic pitch shifting. Used the 16-bit TMS320 DSP chip.
- DSP4000 (1994) - User-programmable algorithms with a large toolkit of DSP functions.
- DSP4000B, DSP4000B+ - Series of processors with algorithms written by sound designer Jay Rose, for broadcast and film production.
- DSP4500 (1998) - Similar to DSP4000 with the addition of sampling.
- DSP7000 (2001) - Pitch shifter / effects processor with four times more processing power than the DSP4000 series
- DSP7500 (2001) - Similar to DSP7000 with the addition of sampling.
- Orville (2001) - Pitch shifter / effects processor with twice the processing power of the DSP7000 / DSP7500 processors and up to 8 channels.
- Eclipse (2002) - First Eventide effects processor to come in single rackspace unit.
- Clockworks Legacy (2003) - Software plug-in versions of classic Eventide effects and DSP.
- BD500 (2004) - 40-second version of Eventide's fourth-generation broadcast profanity delay.

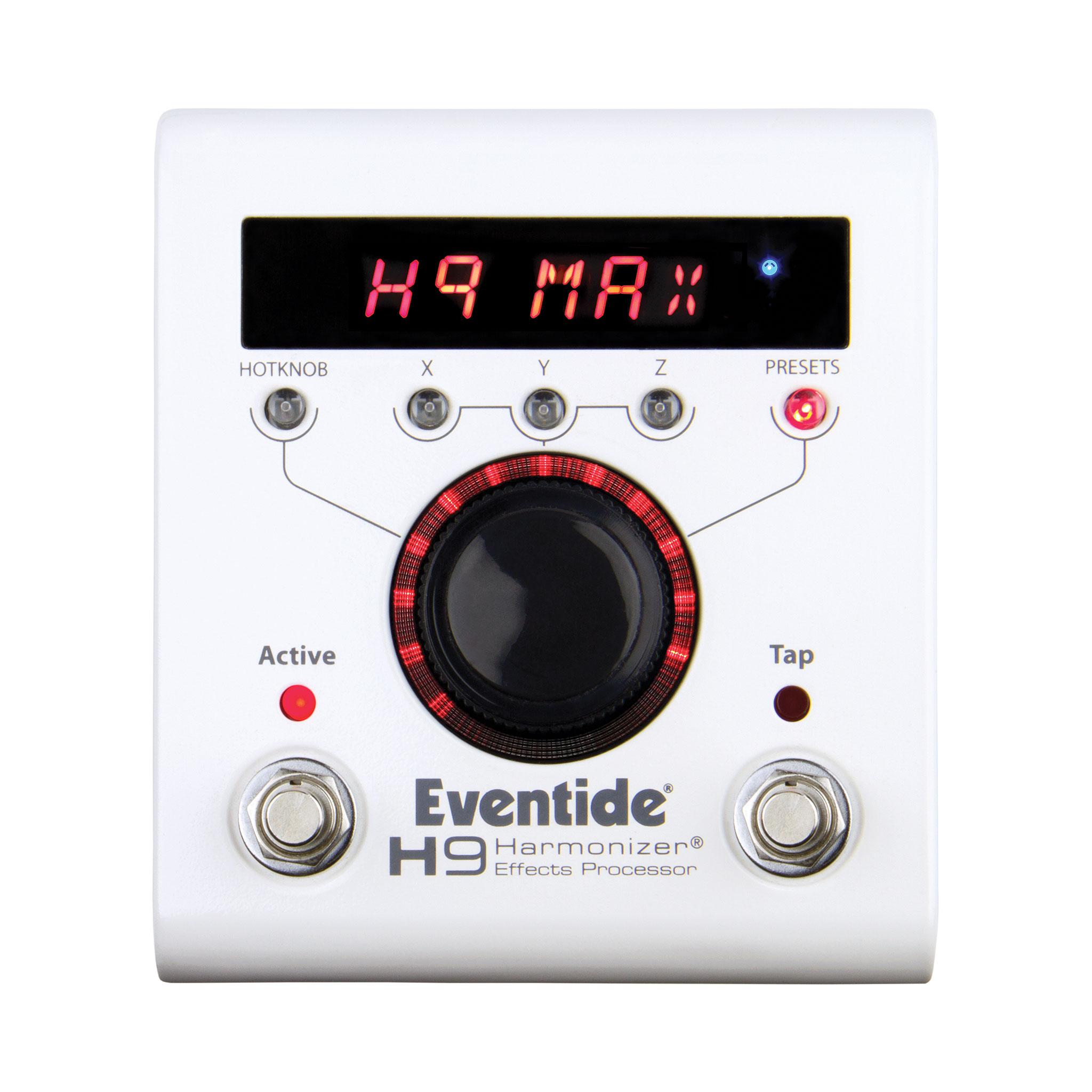
Eventide H9 Max Harmonizer Multi Effects Pedal

- Anthology TDM Bundle (2005)
- H8000FW (2005) - Successor to Orville with increased processing power.
- H7600 (2006) - Successor to the DSP7000 series with increased processing power.
- Stompbox Line (2007) - TimeFactor, ModFactor, Pitchfactor, Space, H9, Powerfactor
- H9000 Network Effects Platform - Modular ARM based DSP design.

== See also ==
- Broadcast delay
- Delay (audio effect)
