= Speed of Life (David Bowie song) =

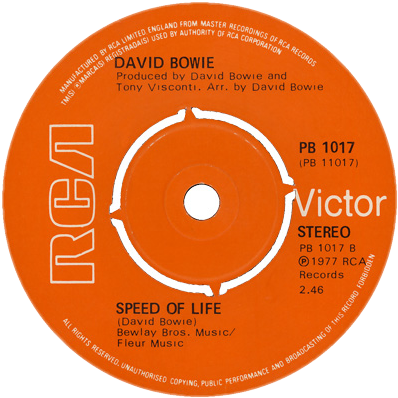
- B-side label of the UK vinyl pressing of the "Be My Wife" single release

Instrumental by David Bowie

from the album Low
- A-side: "Be My Wife"
- Released: 14 January 1977
- Recorded: September–November 1976
- Genre: Art rock; funk
- Length: 2:46
- Label: RCA
- Songwriter: David Bowie
- Producers: David Bowie and Tony Visconti

"Speed of Life" is the first instrumental by David Bowie. It is the opening track on his album Low from 1977.

"Speed of Life" introduces the Low album, and, coupled with the instrumental "A New Career in a New Town", provides a front bookend for the A-side of the album. The track opens with its heavy use of synthesizers as both effects and instruments, with the presence of Dennis Davis' drums and the overlaid harmonizer creating a distinctly different mix than any previous Bowie album.

The song includes the refrain from Here Comes That Rainy Day Feeling Again.

Lyrics were originally planned for this song, but Bowie abandoned the idea after several attempts, deciding that the piece stood better on its own.

== Live versions ==
- Performances from the Isolar II Tour have been released on Stage (1978) and Welcome to the Blackout (2018). The song was also performed during the 2002 tour, in which Bowie played the Low album in its entirety on selected dates.

== Other releases ==
- It was released as the B-side of the single "Be My Wife" in June 1977.
- It also appeared in the Sound + Vision box set.
- It was released as a picture disc in the RCA Life Time picture disc set.

== Production credits ==
- Producers:
  - Tony Visconti
- Musicians:
  - David Bowie - ARP synthesizer, Chamberlin, ARP String Ensemble
  - Carlos Alomar - electric guitar
  - George Murray - bass guitar
  - Dennis Davis - drums
  - Roy Young - piano

== Cover versions ==
- ST-37 – Only Bowie (1995)
- Insect Surfers – Ziggy Played Surf Guitar (Various Artists Compilation) (2011)
- Shearwater – as part of a live performance of the entire Berlin Trilogy for WNYC (2018)

== Sources ==
- Greatorex, Johnathan. "Just a Mortal With Potential." Teenage Wildlife. Nov. 1996. 6 Mar. 2006 <http://www.teenagewildlife.com/Interact/fc/misc/JG/index.html>.
- Griffin, Roger. "Low." Bowie Golden Years. Jan. 2005. 6 Mar. 2006 <http://www.bowiegoldenyears.com/low.html>.
- Wilcken, Hugo, Low, Continuum International Publishing Group Inc, 2005, ISBN 0-8264-1684-5
