= Be My Wife =

Song by David Bowie

- US single

Single by David Bowie

from the album Low
- B-side: "Speed of Life"
- Released: 17 June 1977
- Recorded: September–November 1976
- Studio: Château d'Hérouville (Hérouville, France)
- Genre: Art rock
- Length: 2:55
- Label: RCA
- Songwriter: David Bowie
- Producers: David Bowie; Tony Visconti

David Bowie singles chronology
"Sound and Vision" (1977)	"Be My Wife" (1977)	""Heroes"" (1977)

Spanish cover

Music video
- "Be My Wife" on YouTube

"Be My Wife" is a song by the English singer David Bowie from his eleventh studio album Low (1977). It was released as the second single of the album on 17 June 1977.

"Be My Wife" became the first new Bowie release since "Changes" to fail to break into the UK chart. The song reached number 57, at that time the official list only compiled the top 50 positions, but it appeared on Breakers for two weeks. It was frequently played live on the various tours after its release and Bowie is said to have repeatedly announced this song during live performances as "one of my favourites", as may be seen or heard in such concert footage or audio recordings.

== Background ==
Its presence in Low tones down the electronic feel of the rest of the album. The song also features a more conventional lyric which is closer to a traditional rock song than the more fragmented lyrics elsewhere on that album. The song features a ragtime piano opening, which serves the somewhat retro lyrics some justice, although it is soon set against a backdrop of guitars and drums. The song repeats its lyrics, changing the spacing of the lyrics amongst the song's verse. The song closes simply with a fadeout, as the song returns to the introductory ragtime riff repeating indefinitely, with the rest of the band playing behind it.

== Reception ==
Cash Box said that it "demonstrates the rock and roll side of 'Low'" and that there is also "a shrill organ, unusual guitar and synthesizer lines, and the creative use of a barrelhouse piano."

== Music video ==
"Be My Wife" was Bowie's first official video since "Life on Mars?". The video is similar: Bowie stands alone against a white backdrop singing the song alone. However, Stanley Dorfman's video features Bowie in make-up and clothing influenced by Buster Keaton and giving a detached performance on a guitar.

== Track listing ==
All tracks written by David Bowie.

1. "Be My Wife" – 2:55
2. "Speed of Life" – 2:45

== Personnel ==
- Producers:
  - Tony Visconti
  - David Bowie
- Musicians:
  - David Bowie: lead vocals, lead guitars, pump bass
  - Carlos Alomar: rhythm guitar
  - George Murray: bass
  - Dennis Davis: drums
  - Roy Young: pianos
  - Brian Eno: synthesizers

== Live versions ==
- A live version was recorded during the Isolar II Tour for the Stage album, but was not released until 2005 on the remastered re-release of Stage.
- A live version from Earls Court, London, on 1 July 1978, was released on the semi-legal album Rarestonebowie in 1995. This recording was later released on the official live album Welcome to the Blackout in 2018.
- The song was played during the first leg of the 1990 Sound And Vision tour. A film and audio recording from the Tokyo Dome in Japan was syndicated worldwide to radio and TV stations – and has been heavily bootlegged – and can be viewed on streaming platforms.
- A live performance filmed in Dublin in November 2003 during the A Reality Tour can be viewed on the DVD and is included on the corresponding album.

== Other releases ==
- The song appeared on the following compilation albums:
  - Sound + Vision box set (1989)
  - Bowie: The Singles 1969–1993 (1993)
- It was released as a picture disc in the RCA Life Time picture disc set.
- Momus performed a cover version for his 2015 album Turpsycore.
- Max Lorentz released a version for his 2011 album Kiss You In The Rain – Max Lorentz Sings David Bowie.
