= Subterraneans =

Song by David Bowie

from the album Low
- Released: 14 January 1977
- Recorded: December 1975, Cherokee Studios, Los Angeles; September 1976, Château d'Hérouville, France; October–November 1976, Hansa Studio by the Wall, West Berlin, Germany
- Genre: Dark ambient
- Length: 5:39
- Label: RCA
- Songwriter: David Bowie
- Producers: David Bowie and Tony Visconti

"Subterraneans" is a song by David Bowie, the closing track of his 1977 album Low. As with most of side two, "Subterraneans" is mostly instrumental, with brief, obscure lyrics sung near the song's end.

"Subterraneans" was first recorded in 1975 and intended for the soundtrack to the 1976 film The Man Who Fell to Earth. It was later revisited during the sessions for Low.

== Musical characteristics ==
After the Station to Station sessions ended in November 1975 at Cherokee Studios in Los Angeles, David Bowie recorded "Subterraneans" within those studios in December 1975. The song later received overdubs by Brian Eno.

The sleeve notes of Low credit "Peter and Paul with additional ARP synthesizer and piano". The "Peter and Paul" mentioned are Peter Robinson, who played Fender Rhodes, and Paul Buckmaster (the composer of the string arrangements for the Rolling Stones' "Moonlight Mile") who played the ARP Odyssey. Peter Robinson and Paul Buckmaster worked with Bowie at Cherokee Studios in late 1975 on the aborted movie soundtrack to The Man Who Fell to Earth.

"Subterraneans" was ultimately the most heavily edited song on Low, with David Bowie's saxophone, as well as multilayered synthesizers and reversed instrument sounds from Brian Eno, floating underneath a moaned vocal which is wordless until around the final ninety seconds. The soundscapes contain a cinematic quality which evokes the feel of Miles Davis' landmark album In a Silent Way.

Bowie related the song to the misery of those in East Berlin during the Cold War. According to Bowie, people who "got caught in East Berlin after the separation – hence the faint jazz saxophones representing the memory of what it was."

== Personnel ==
- David Bowie: Vocals, saxophone, reversed electric guitar, ARP String Ensemble
- Paul Buckmaster: ARP Odyssey synthesizer
- Peter Robinson : Reversed Fender Rhodes electric piano
- Brian Eno: ARP 2600 synthesizer, piano
- Carlos Alomar: Reversed electric guitar
- George Murray: Reversed bass guitar
- Tony Visconti: Production

== Other versions ==
- Philip Glass – Low Symphony (1992)
- Nine Inch Nails – Live recording (with David Bowie) (1995)
- Dylan Howe – Jazz reconstruction for his album Subterranean – New Designs on Bowie's Berlin (2014)
- Alva Noto with Martin Gore (vocals) and William Basinski (saxophone) – vinyl and digital single (2022)
