= Weeping Wall (instrumental) =

Instrumental by David Bowie

from the album Low
- Released: 14 January 1977
- Recorded: October–November 1976
- Genre: Electronic, minimalism
- Length: 3:28
- Label: RCA
- Songwriter(s): David Bowie
- Producer(s): David Bowie, Tony Visconti

"Weeping Wall" is an instrumental piece by David Bowie from his album Low, released in 1977.

The track has been described by Bowie as intending to evoke the misery of the Berlin Wall, being a portrait piece like the other music on Side Two of Low. The principal melody is an adaptation of the tune "Scarborough Fair".

Bowie plays all instruments on the recording, the album's only solo track, including several percussion instruments and synthesizers. His voice is also present in a wordless chorus. Its minimalistic style has been seen as bearing the influence of composer Steve Reich. According to Reich, Bowie had attended the European premiere of Music for 18 Musicians at the National Gallery of Berlin in 1976. "And I think 'Weeping Wall' on Low is somewhat indebted to that," Reich has said. Bowie himself recalled seeing Music for 18 Musicians performed "live in downtown New York in the late 70s" and described it as "Balinese gamelan music cross-dressing as Minimalism... Astonishing."

While Brian Eno and NME editors Roy Carr and Charles Shaar Murray have suggested that "Weeping Wall" began life as part of Bowie's aborted soundtrack to The Man Who Fell to Earth, the composer himself maintained that the piece was composed especially for Low.

== Personnel ==
- David Bowie – vocals, guitar, vibraphone, xylophone, synthesizers, piano, Chamberlin, percussion
