= David Bowie videography =

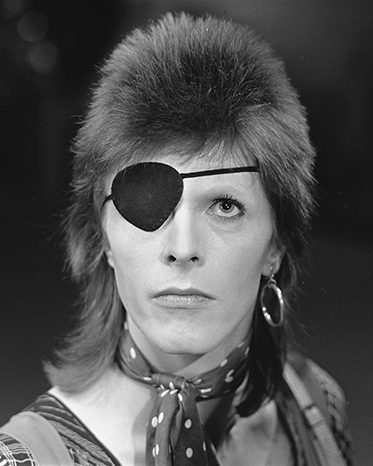
- Bowie performing "Rebel Rebel" on TopPop in 1974

The videography of English singer-songwriter and actor David Bowie (1947–2016). This page gives an overview of his music video singles, music video films and compilations, live music films and music documentaries.

== Music videos ==
This subsection and 'Posthumous music video singles' lists music videos that were prepared to accompany single releases. See the subsection titled 'Music video films' for projects where music videos were originally conceived as films (a single video in a wider filmic setting or collection of music videos produced as a single project, or an amalgam of both); and the subsection titles 'Music video compilations' for audio-visual releases that were compiled from video music singles for later release.

Title	Year	Director(s)	Album
"John, I'm Only Dancing" (unbroadcast) (Note: The "John, I'm Only Dancing" video was made for BBC's Top of the Pops to be shown while Bowie was away touring in the USA. However, it went unboradcast. Reasons include the sexual nature of some of the images in the video, and that – given this was the earliest days of the music video – Bowie's manager Tony Defries wanted to charge the BBC what they saw as exorbitant fee.)	1972	Mick Rock	Non-album single
"The Jean Genie"	1972	Mick Rock	Aladdin Sane
"Space Oddity" (official retrospective release (US)) (Note: This release of "Space Oddity" in January 1973 was primarily focused at the US, where it gained Bowie his first hit. The single was not released in the UK. It was however released in a few other territories: Canada, Spain, Australia, Mexico, Puru and Japan.)	1972	Mick Rock	David Bowie (1969 album)
"Life on Mars?" (official retrospective release (UK)) (Note: "Life on Mars?" was released in the UK and a limited number of other territories. It was not released in the US / North America.)	1973	Mick Rock	Hunky Dory
"Be My Wife"	1977	Stanley Dorfman	Low
"'Heroes'" (Note: There is also another rough cut version of the "'Heroes'" music video, sometimes known as the 'alternative take' or – more accurately, 'take 1'. 'The "'Heroes'" promo outtakes reel is just under 28 minutes long. It contains one complete take, and 8 partial takes of "Heroes" [...] The official promo for "'Heroes'" utilizes sections from most of the takes, in long cross dissolves. The only complete take of "'Heroes'", Take 1, was barely used – all that was included was the 10 seconds of "I would be king, and you, you would be queen" [...] The complete Take 1 [...] includes many full-face close-ups of Bowie [... and] was largely unused due to the fact that Bowie's miming in it was not very accurate [...] since the promo was for immediate use – we see it included on the "L'Altra Domenica" show a few days later – perhaps there was no time for a very sophisticated edit.' As this source notes regarding the tape: 'In addition, there are a couple of takes of about 30 seconds of "Blackout". And about 3 minutes of close-ups of Bowie slowly bringing his hand to his face, mimicking the "Heroes" album cover whilst "Sense of Doubt" plays in the background. It seems there was no intention of creating promos for the latter two songs; the footage was merely to be used in the two TV commercials for the "Heroes" album.')	1977	Stanley Dorfman	"Heroes"
"Boys Keep Swinging"	1979	David Mallet	Lodger
"DJ"	1979	David Mallet	Lodger
"Look Back in Anger"	1979	David Mallet	Lodger
"Ashes to Ashes"	1980	David Bowie and David Mallet	Scary Monsters (and Super Creeps)
"Fashion"	1980	David Mallet	Scary Monsters (and Super Creeps)
"Under Pressure" (as Queen and David Bowie)	1981	David Mallet	Hot Space
"Wild Is the Wind"	1981	David Mallet	Station to Station/Changestwobowie
"The Drowned Girl"	1982	David Mallet	Baal (EP)
"Let's Dance"	1983	David Mallet and David Bowie	Let's Dance
"China Girl"	1983	David Mallet and David Bowie	Let's Dance
"Modern Love"	1983	Jim Yukich	Let's Dance
"Blue Jean"	1984	Julien Temple	Tonight
"This Is Not America" (as David Bowie / Pat Metheny Group)	1985	John Schlesinger	The Falcon and the Snowman (soundtrack)
"Loving the Alien"	1985	David Bowie and David Mallet	Tonight
"Dancing in the Street" (by David Bowie and Mick Jagger)	1985	David Mallet	Non-album single
"Absolute Beginners"	1986	Julien Temple	Absolute Beginners (soundtrack)
"Underground"	1986	Steve Barron	Labyrinth (1986 soundtrack)
"As the World Falls Down" (video never officially released)	1986	Steve Barron	Labyrinth (1986 soundtrack)
"When the Wind Blows"	1986	Jimmy T. Murakami	When the Wind Blows (1986 soundtrack)
"Day-In Day-Out" (single version) "Day-In Day-Out" (dance mix version)	1987	Julien Temple	Never Let Me Down
"Time Will Crawl"	1987	Tim Pope	Never Let Me Down
"Never Let Me Down"	1987	Jean-Baptiste Mondino	Never Let Me Down
"Fame '90"	1990	Gus van Sant	Changesbowie
"Pretty Pink Rose" (as Adrian Belew and David Bowie)	1990	Tim Pope	Young Lions
"Real Cool World"	1992		Songs from the Cool World
"Jump They Say"	1993	Mark Romanek	Black Tie White Noise
"Black Tie White Noise" (with Al B. Sure!)	1993	Mark Romanek	Black Tie White Noise
"Miracle Goodnight"	1993	Matthew Rolston	Black Tie White Noise
"Buddha of Suburbia"	1993	Roger Michell	The Buddha of suburbia (soundtrack)
"The Hearts Filthy Lesson"	1995	Samuel Bayer	Outside
"Strangers When We Meet"	1995	Samuel Bayer	Outside
"Hallo Spaceboy" (remix with Pet Shop Boys)	1996	David Mallet	Outside
"Little Wonder"	1997	Floria Sigismondi	Earthling
"Dead Man Walking"	1997	Floria Sigismondi	Earthling
"Seven Years in Tibet" "Seven Years in Tibet" (Mandarin Version)	1997	Rudi Dolezal and Hannes Rosacher	Earthling
"Perfect Day" (with various artists for Children in Need)	1997		Non-album single
"I'm Afraid of Americans"	1997	Dom and Nic	Earthling
"Thursday's Child"	1999	Walter Stern	Hours
"The Pretty Things Are Going to Hell" (unfinished / video never released)	1999	Dom and Nic	Hours
"Survive"	2000	Walter Stern	Hours
"Slow Burn" (video not released with single, made available in 2011)	2002	Gary Koepke	Heathen
"New Killer Star"	2003	Brumby Boylston	Reality
"Where Are We Now?"	2013	Tony Oursler	The Next Day
"The Stars (Are Out Tonight)”	2013	Floria Sigismondi	The Next Day
"The Next Day"	2013	Floria Sigismondi	The Next Day
"Valentine's Day"	2013	Indrani and Markus Klinko	The Next Day
"Love Is Lost (Hello Steve Reich mix by James Murphy for the DFA)" (Version 1)	2013	David Bowie	The Next Day
"Love Is Lost (Hello Steve Reich mix by James Murphy for the DFA)" (Version 2)	2013	Barnaby Roper	The Next Day
"I'd Rather Be High – Venetian Mix (Wasted edit)"	2013	Tom Hingston	The Next Day
"Sue (Or in a Season of Crime)"	2014	Tom Hingston and Jimmy King	Nothing Has Changed
"Blackstar"	2015	Bo Johan Renck	Blackstar
"Lazarus"	2016	Bo Johan Renck	Blackstar
Posthumous			
"I Can't Give Everything Away"	2016	Jonathan Barnbrook	Blackstar
"Life on Mars? (2016 Mix)"	2016	Mick Rock	
"No Plan"	2017	Tom Hingston	
"Space Oddity" (1990 Live Footage) (2019 mix)	2019	Tim Pope	
"Cosmic Dancer" (Live) (with Morrissey)	2020	Tim Broad	

=== Music videos as a member of Tin Machine ===
Title	Year	Director(s)
"Heaven's in Here" (promo single / unreleased video)	1989	Julien Temple
"Under the God" (album version)	1989	Julien Temple
"Maggie's Farm" (live version)	1989	Julien Temple
"Prisoner of Love" (album version)	1989	Julien Temple
"You Belong in Rock 'n' Roll"	1991	Julien Temple
"Baby Universal"	1991	Julien Temple
"One Shot"	1991	Julien Temple

=== Music video films ===
This subsection of music videos lists audio-visual releases that were originally conceived as films, that is, a single video in a wider filmic setting or collection of music videos produced as a single project, or an amalgam of both.

Title	Video details	Peak chart positions
Title	Video details	USTopMusicVideo
Love You till Tuesday	Release: 1984; Director: Malcolm J Thomson; Distributor: Castle Music Videos; Format: VHS	—
Jazzin' for Blue Jean	Release: 1984; Director Julien Temple; Distributor: PMI; Format: VHS	28
Black Tie White Noise	Release: 1993; Director: David Mallet; Distributor: BMG Video International; Format: VHS, LD, VCD	—
Reality	Release: 2004; Director: Steve Lippman aka FLIP; Distributor: Columbia Records.; Format: DVD	—
"—" denotes releases that did not chart. "x" denotes single not released in that territory.

==== Music video films as a member of Tin Machine ====
Title	Video details
Tin Machine	Screened: 1989; Director: Julien Temple; Unreleased to home video market

=== Live television films ===
Live television films are concerts staged specifically for television broadcast.

Title	Film details
The Midnight Special: The 1980 Floor Show	Broadcast: 16 November 1973; USA NBC; Unreleased
Musikladen: Live at the Beat Club	Broadcast: 4 August 1978; Germany; Unreleased
David Bowie and Friends: A Very Special Birthday Concert	Broadcast: 9 January 1997; Pay-per-view; Unreleased
VH1 Storytellers	Broadcast: 1999; USA VH1; Released: 2009; Formats: DVD
The Secret Roseland	Broadcast: 2000; davidbowie.com; Released: 2000; Formats: Streaming
Bowie at the Beeb	Broadcast: 2000; UK BBC; Released: 2000; Formats: CD
Live by Request: David Bowie	Broadcast: 2002; USA A&E Network; Unreleased
"—" denotes releases that did not chart. "x" denotes single not released in that territory.

=== Live concert films ===
Live concert films are tour concerts filmed for TV broadcast, cinema release and / or the home video market.

Title	Film details	Peak chart positions		Certifications
Title	Film details	GER	USTopMusicVideo	Certifications
Serious Moonlight	Released: February 1984; Distributors: WarnerVision, Pioneer Artists, Nikkatsu; Format: VHS, LD	—	10	
Ziggy Stardust and the Spiders from Mars: The Motion Picture	Released: August 1984; Distributors: Warner Home Video, Image Entertainment; Formats: VHS, LD	—	—	BPI: Gold
Glass Spider	Released: 1988; Distributor: Stenton; Formats: VHS, LD	—	—	
Reality: Tour Edition	Released: 2003, 2004; Distributor: Columbia; Format: DVD	—	—	
A Reality Tour	Released: 2004; Distributor: Columbia; Format: DVD	59	—	BPI: Platinum; ARIA: Platinum; RIAA: Platinum
Posthumous
Glastonbury 2000	Released: 2018; Distributor: Parlophone; Format: DVD	—	—	
"—" denotes releases that did not chart. "x" denotes single not released in that territory.

==== Live concert films as a member of Tin Machine ====
Title	Film details
Oy Vey, Baby – Tin Machine Live at The Docks	Released: 1992; Distributor: PolyGram Video; Format: VHS

=== Music videos and films compilations ===
This subsection of music videos lists audio-visual releases that were compiled from video music singles and Live TV and concert performances and films.

Title	Video details	Peak chart positions	Certifications(sales thresholds)
Title	Video details	USTopMusicVideo	Certifications(sales thresholds)
Let's Dance Video EP	Released: 1983; Distributor: EMI; Format: VHS	—	
Day-In Day-Out	Released: 1987; Distributor: PMI; Format: VHS	—	
Black Tie White Noise	Released: 1993; Distributor: BMG Video International; Format: VHS, LD, VCD	—	
The Video Collection	Released: 1993; Distributor: PMI; Formats: VHS, VCD	—	
Best of Bowie	Released: 2002; Distributor: EMI; Format: DVD	9	BPI: 3× Platinum; ARIA: 2× Platinum; RIAA: Platinum; MC: 2× Platinum; BVMI: Gold
The Next Day Extra	Released: 2013; Distributor: ISO, Columbia; Formats: DVD	—	
"—" denotes releases that did not chart.

=== Music documentary films ===
Title	Year	Broadcast/Release	Director(s)
Nationwide Report: David Bowie	1973	Original broadcast: 1973. Unreleased	Narr. by Bernard Falk
Cracked Actor	1975	Original broadcast: 26 January 1975. Unreleased	Alan Yentob
Ricochet	1984	Released on VHS 1984. Re-released on DVD (extended version) 2006.	Gerry Troyna
David Bowie: Black Tie White Noise	1993	Released on VHS 1993. Re-released on DVD 2003.	David Mallet
David Bowie: Changes	1997	Broadcast 8 January 1997. Unreleased	Alan Yentob
David Bowie: An Earthling at 50	1997	Broadcast 1997 in UK. Unreleased	Steven Lock
VH1's Legends: David Bowie	1998	Broadcast 10 December 1998. Unreleased	Mary Wharton
David Bowie: Sound and Vision	2003	Broadcast 4 November 2002. Released on DVD 2003.	Rick Hull
David Smiling Bowie	2003	Broadcast 7 October 2003 in Denmark. Unreleased	Ole Kolster
Biography: David Bowie	2008	Broadcast 11 December 2008. Released on DVD 19 May 2009.	Scott Engel
David Bowie: Rare and Unseen	2010	Broadcast 2 August 2010 in UK. Released on DVD 23 November 2010.	Paul Clark
David Bowie: The Man Who Stole the World a.k.a. The Story of Ziggy Stardust	2012	Broadcast 22 June 2012 in UK. Released on streaming 2014.	James Hale
David Bowie: Five Years	2013	Broadcast 25 May 2013. Unreleased	Francis Whately
David Bowie: The Last Five Years	2017	Broadcast 7 January 2017. Unreleased	Francis Whately
Beside Bowie: The Mick Ronson Story	2017	Broadcast 9 May 2017 in UK. Released on DVD and streaming 27 October 2017.	Jon Brewer
David Bowie: Finding Fame a.k.a. David Bowie: The First Five Years	2019	Broadcast 9 February 2019. Unreleased	Francis Whately
Moonage Daydream	2022	Released on 16 September 2022	Brett Morgen
Bowie: The Final Act	2025	Broadcast 26 December 2025	Jonathan Stiasny

=== Other video and television appearances ===
Video album	Year	Artist	Details	Ref.
Bing Crosby's Merrie Olde Christmas	1977	Bing Crosby	"Peace on Earth/Little Drummer Boy" (with Bing Crosby), "'Heroes'"	
The Freddie Mercury Tribute Concert for AIDS Awareness	1992	Various artists	"Under Pressure" (with Queen (band) and Annie Lennox), "All the Young Dudes" (with Queen, Ian Hunter, Mick Ronson, Joe Elliott and Phil Collen), "'Heroes'"/"The Lord's Prayer" (with Queen and Mick Ronson)	
Tina Live: Private Dancer Tour	1994	Tina Turner	Guest vocals ("Tonight", "Let's Dance")	
Closure	1997	Nine Inch Nails	Guest vocals ("Hurt")	
The Concert for New York City	2002	Various artists	"America", "'Heroes'"	
Jesus? ..This Is Iggy	2002	Iggy Pop	Interviews and archive footage	
Once More with Feeling: Videos 1996–2004	2004	Placebo	Live video for "Without You I'm Nothing" and the 1999 Brit Awards performance of "20th Century Boy"	
Live Aid	2004	Various artists	"TVC 15", "Rebel Rebel", "Modern Love" and "'Heroes'" with Thomas Dolby; "Do They Know It's Christmas?" with Band Aid	
Remember 60s Vol. 4	2004	Various artists	A Dutch compilation featuring "Space Oddity" performed on the Swiss TV show "Hits A Go Go" on 2 November 1969	
40 Jaar Top 40: 1969–1970	2004	Various artists	A Dutch compilation featuring the live performance of "Space Oddity" at the Ivor Novello Awards on 10 May 1970	
The Nomi Song	2005	Klaus Nomi	Includes footage of Nomi's performance with Bowie on Saturday Night Live in 1979	
Dick Cavett: Rock Icons	2005	Various artists	An interview and performances of "1984", "Young Americans" and "Footstompin'" from The Dick Cavett Show recorded on 2 November 1974	
Burt Sugarman's The Midnight Special: Million Sellers	2006	Various artists	Live performance of "Space Oddity" from the 1980 Floor Show concerts filmed for NBC's The Midnight Special	
Remember That Night	2007	David Gilmour	Guest appearance at the Royal Albert Hall on 29 May 2006 performing "Arnold Layne" and "Comfortably Numb"	
The Ballad of Mott the Hoople	2011	Mott the Hoople	Bowie's previously unseen performance with Mott the Hoople, playing tambourine and backing vocals on "All the Young Dudes"; recorded in Philadelphia on 29 November 1972	

== See also ==
- David Bowie filmography - a list of Bowie's appearances in film.
