= David Bowie filmography =

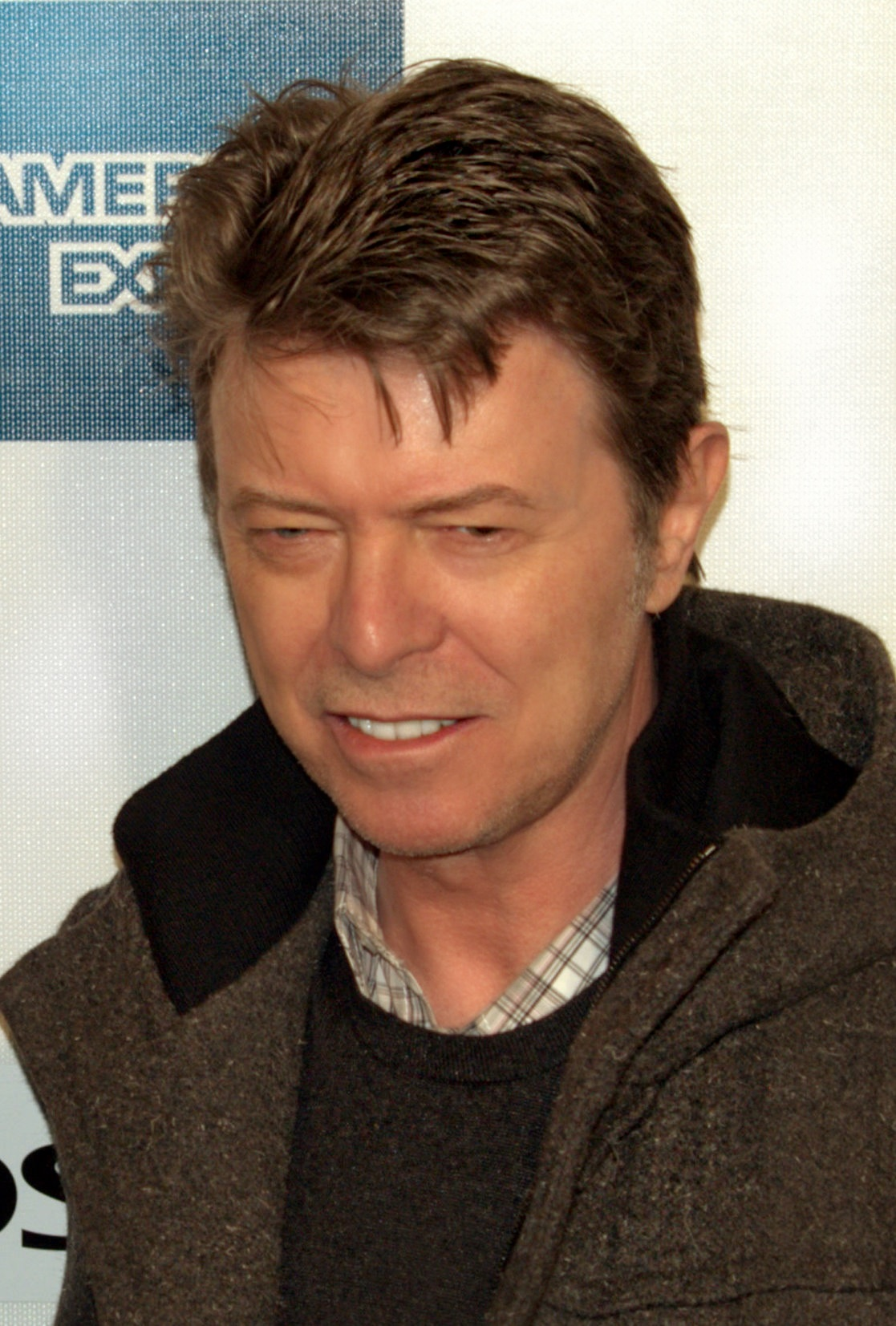
David Bowie at the Tribeca Film Festival in 2009

David Bowie (1947–2016) appeared in over 30 films, television shows and theatrical productions. He largely stuck to cameos and supporting parts in place of starring roles, having once described his film career as "splashing in the kids' pool". His projects were mostly with arthouse directors that he felt were outside the Hollywood mainstream. Throughout his career, his acting received critical acclaim, including admiration for his stage presence.

Bowie's acting career predated his commercial breakthrough as a musician. His first film was a short film called The Image, shot in 1967 and released in 1969. Between 1967 and 1969, he made appearances in Lindsay Kemp's theatrical production Pierrot in Turquoise, and filmed walk-on rolls for an episode of the BBC drama series Theatre 625 and Leslie Thomas's The Virgin Soldiers (1969). Bowie's first major film role was the alien Thomas Jerome Newton in Nicolas Roeg's The Man Who Fell to Earth (1976), for which he received critical acclaim and is regarded as one of his best performances. In 1978, Bowie starred alongside Marlene Dietrich in David Hemmings's Just a Gigolo, a critical failure that Bowie expressed disappointment in.

Bowie was active on stage and screen in the 1980s, beginning with playing Joseph Merrick in the Broadway theatre production The Elephant Man (1980–1981) and starring in the titular role in a BBC adaptation of the Bertolt Brecht play Baal (1982). Throughout 1983, he had starring roles in Tony Scott's The Hunger, Nagisa Ōshima's Merry Christmas, Mr. Lawrence, and a small cameo in Mel Damski's Yellowbeard. In 1986, Bowie had a supporting role in Julien Temple's Absolute Beginners, for which he sang its successful title song, and starred as Jareth the Goblin King in Jim Henson's Labyrinth (1986), for which he recorded its accompanying soundtrack album with Trevor Jones. In 1988, he played Pontius Pilate in Martin Scorsese's The Last Temptation of Christ (1988).

Bowie took largely smaller parts throughout the 1990s. In 1991, he appeared in an episode of the HBO sitcom Dream On and in Richard Shepard's The Linguini Incident. The following year, Bowie portrayed FBI agent Phillip Jeffries in David Lynch's Twin Peaks: Fire Walk with Me (1992). He then made appearances in Julian Schnabel's Basquiat (1996) as his friend Andy Warhol, Giovanni Veronesi's Il Mio West (1998, released as Gunslinger's Revenge in the US in 2005), Andrew Goth's Everybody Loves Sunshine (1999), and as the host in the second season of the horror anthology series The Hunger. In 1999, Bowie voiced two characters in the Dreamcast game Omikron: The Nomad Soul, his only appearance in a video game.

In the 2000s, Bowie appeared in Nicholas Kendall's Mr. Rice's Secret (2000), and made cameos as himself in Ben Stiller's Zoolander (2001) and Eric Idle's The Rutles 2: Can't Buy Me Lunch (2002). In 2005, he filmed a commercial with Snoop Dogg for XM Satellite Radio. In 2006, he portrayed Nikola Tesla in Christopher Nolan's The Prestige, voice-acted in Luc Besson's animated film Arthur and the Minimoys and appeared as himself in an episode of the television series Extras. He voice-acted again in the television film SpongeBob's Atlantis SquarePantis, before taking a supporting role in Austin Chick's August (2008) and appearing as himself in Todd Graff's Bandslam (2009), his final film appearance.

Bowie was featured in several documentaries, films, and videos focusing on his career. He also appeared frequently in documentaries about other musicians.

== Film ==
=== As actor ===
Title	Year	Role	Medium	Notes	Ref(s)
Theatre 625	1968	Unidentified	Television series	Episode: "The Pistol Shot" Lost	
The Image	1969	The Boy	Short film	First film; shot in September 1967	
The Virgin Soldiers	1969	Soldier	Feature film	Uncredited	
Pierrot in Turquoise or The Looking Glass Murders	1970	Cloud	Television film		
The Man Who Fell to Earth	1976	Thomas Jerome Newton	Feature film		
Just a Gigolo	1978	Paul Ambrosius von Przygodski	Feature film		
Christiane F.	1981	Himself	Feature film	Cameo	
The Snowman	1982	Older James	Television film	Alternative opening	
Baal	1982	Baal	Television film		
The Hunger	1983	John Blaylock	Feature film		
Merry Christmas, Mr. Lawrence	1983	Maj. Jack 'Strafer' Celliers	Feature film		
Yellowbeard	1983	The Shark	Feature film	Uncredited cameo	
Jazzin' for Blue Jean	1984	Screamin' Lord Byron / Vic	Short film		
Into the Night	1985	Colin Morris	Feature film		
Absolute Beginners	1986	Vendice Partners	Feature film		
Labyrinth	1986	Jareth the Goblin King	Feature film		
The Last Temptation of Christ	1988	Pontius Pilate	Feature film		
Dream On	1991	Sir Roland Moorecock	Television series	Episode: "The Second Greatest Story Ever Told"	
The Linguini Incident	1991	Monte	Feature film		
Twin Peaks: Fire Walk with Me	1992	Phillip Jeffries	Feature film		
Full Stretch	1993	Himself	Television series	Episode: "Ivory Tower"	
Basquiat	1996	Andy Warhol	Feature film		
Il Mio West	1998	Jack Sikora	Feature film	Released in 2005 as Gunslinger's Revenge	
Everybody Loves Sunshine	1999	Bernie	Feature film	Also released as B.U.S.T.E.D	
Omikron: The Nomad Soul	1999	Boz / The Dreamers	Video game	Voice	
The Hunger	1999–2000	The Host / Julian Priest	Television series	20 episodes	
Empty	2000	Man	Short film	Short film	
Mr. Rice's Secret	2000	William Rice	Feature film		
Zoolander	2001	Himself	Feature film	Cameo	
The Rutles 2: Can't Buy Me Lunch	2003	Himself	Television film		
Extras	2006	Himself	Television series	Episode: "David Bowie"	
The Prestige	2006	Nikola Tesla	Feature film		
Arthur and the Minimoys	2007	Emperor Maltazard	Feature film	Voice	
SpongeBob SquarePants	2007	Lord Royal Highness (L.R.H)	Television series	Voice; Episode: "SpongeBob's Atlantis SquarePantis"	
August	2008	Cyrus Ogilvie	Feature film		
Bandslam	2009	Himself	Feature film	Cameo	
Twin Peaks: The Missing Pieces	2014	Phillip Jeffries	Compilation film	Archived footage	
Twin Peaks: The Return	2017	Phillip Jeffries	Television series	2 episodes; Archived footage; Released posthumously	

=== As subject of documentary or video ===
This list contains documentaries and videos that have been officially released as films, television broadcasts and/or home video, ordered by date filmed. Bootlegs and privately distributed videos are not included. The list is selective, particularly with respect to television performances and interviews.

Title	Year filmed	Year first released	Medium	Releases				Notes
Title	Year filmed	Year first released	Medium	Film	Television	VHS	DVD	Notes
Love You Till Tuesday	1969	1984	Promotional film	—	—	1984	2005 (UK)	The film was unreleased until its 1984 video release. The 2005 DVD release contains the television film Pierrot in Turquoise (also known as The Looking Glass Murders) as an extra.
Ziggy Stardust and the Spiders from Mars	1973 (July)	1974	Concert film	1979 (world premiere); 1983 (general cinema release); 2002 (re-release)	1974 (ABC, In Concert; short 60 min version)	1984	1998; 2003 (enhanced version)	The film screened a few times in 16 mm format before its 1979 world premiere. Video and DVD releases were under the title Ziggy Stardust and the Spiders from Mars: The Motion Picture. Jeff Beck appeared in the TV version, but not in other releases.
The 1980 Floor Show	1973 (November)	1973	Promotional film / concert film	—	1973 (NBC, The Midnight Special)	—	—	The film has been broadcast more than once on NBC since the first showing. Clips from the film were also shown on the UK television show Top of the Pops. Marianne Faithfull, The Troggs and Carmen also appeared. No official home video release.
Cracked Actor	1974	1975	Documentary / concert film	—	1975 (BBC Two), rebroadcast 2013 (BBC Imagine)	—	—	The film was made for the BBC's Omnibus documentary series. No official home video release.
Live at the Beat Club	1978	1978	Concert film	—	4 August 1978 (Radio Bremen, Musikladen)	—	—	Filmed on 30 May 1978. Following its original broadcast, the film was shown in reruns on German TV and on VH1 in 2003. No official home video release.
Serious Moonlight	1983	1984	Concert video	—	—	1984	1999 (unofficial release); 2006 (official release)	The 2006 release also includes an extended version of the film Ricochet as an extra.
Ricochet	1984	1985	Documentary / concert film	—	1986 (USA, Night Flight)	1985	2006 (extended version included as an extra on the Serious Moonlight DVD)	The film version originally aired on U.S. television and released on VHS was approximately 58 minutes long. The version released as an extra on the 2006 Serious Moonlight DVD is an extended version running approximately 78 minutes. The film has occasionally been screened since its TV and home video release.
Glass Spider	1987	1988	Concert film	—	1988 (ABC special, David Bowie: Glass Spider Tour; short 50 min version)	1988	2001 (as Glass Spider Tour); re-released 2007	Peter Frampton and Charlie Sexton also appeared.
Tin Machine	1989	1989	Documentary / concert film	—	—	–	—	A medley of performance-style clips from Tin Machine's 1989 debut album. The film has rarely been screened in its entirety and has not been officially released.
Tin Machine Live: Oy Vey, Baby	1991	1992	Documentary / concert film	—	—	1992	—	Alternate title is Tin Machine: Live at the Docks. The film shows a 1991 Tin Machine concert in Hamburg, a different performance from those used on the Tin Machine Live: Oy Vey, Baby album release. No official DVD release.
Bowie – The Video Collection	1993 or earlier	1993	Music video compilation	—	Prior to the home video release, individual music videos had been broadcast on various TV programs and channels.	1993	—	Compilation of music videos from Bowie's career up to 1993. These videos were later included, along with new additional material, on the Best of Bowie DVD.
David Bowie: Black Tie White Noise	1993	1993	Documentary (interview) / mimed performances / music video compilation (3 videos included at end)	—	—	1993	2005	Both the VHS release and the later DVD release contain interviews interspersed with mimed performances and followed by three music videos. The DVD contains additional chapter stops marking the start of the interviews.
David Bowie and Friends: A Very Special Birthday Concert	1997	1997	Concert film	—	Broadcast as a pay-per-view television special in the U.S. in March 1997	—	—	Bowie's 50th birthday concert, filmed at Madison Square Garden. Frank Black, Foo Fighters, Sonic Youth, Robert Smith, Lou Reed and Billy Corgan also perform. No official home video release.
VH1 Storytellers: David Bowie	1999	1999	Concert film	—	1999 (VH1; VH1 Storytellers) (8 songs)	—	2009 (extended version, 12 songs)	The original VH1 broadcast contained performances of 8 songs. The 2009 DVD and iTunes release contains the original 8 songs, plus performances of 4 additional songs.
Best of Bowie	2002 or earlier	2002	Concert film / music video / documentary (interview) compilation	Includes a clip from previously released film Ziggy Stardust and the Spiders from Mars.	Includes live clips that were broadcast on 1970s television shows The Old Grey Whistle Test, The Dick Cavett Show, TopPop, and Russell Harty Plus. Some individual music videos had also been broadcast on MTV, VH1 and other TV programs and channels.	Includes material from earlier VHS releases, including all the music videos from Bowie – The Video Collection (1993), and clips from Ziggy Stardust and the Spiders from Mars: The Motion Picture (1984) and Serious Moonlight (1984).	2002	DVD compilation of live concert clips and music videos, most of which were previously released in some form. Includes the videos from Bowie – The Video Collection (1993) along with additional videos, live performance clips, an interview and an advertisement. Also contains the promotional film Jazzin' for Blue Jean. Some material is accessible only via Easter eggs.
Reality album bonus DVD	2003	2003	Concert film	—	—	—	2003	Contains live in-studio performances of all Reality album tracks. DVD was released as a bonus with special tour edition of Reality album.
A Reality Tour	2003	2004	Concert film	—	—	—	2004	Film of a live concert from the 2003–2004 Reality Tour.
David Bowie: Five Years	2013	2013	Documentary film	—	BBC Two	—	—	Produced and directed by Francis Whately
David Bowie: The Last Five Years	2016	2017	Documentary film	—	BBC Two	—	—	Produced and directed by Francis Whately
David Bowie: Finding Fame	2019	2019	Documentary film	—	BBC Two	—	—	Produced and directed by Francis Whately
Bowie: The Man Who Changed the World	2016	2016	Documentary film	—	—	—	2016	Directed by Sonia Anderson
Moonage Daydream	2022	2022	Documentary film	—	—	—	2022	First film to be officially authorized by Bowie's estate, exploring his creative, musical and spiritual journey through never-before-seen footage, performances and music.
Bowie: The Final Act	2025	2025	Documentary film	2025	2025	–	–	Directed by Jonathan Stiasny

=== As himself in other documentaries ===
This list is selective. For a more complete list, see Nicholas Pegg's The Complete David Bowie.

- Group Madness: The Making of Yellowbeard (1983)
- Cool Cats: Twenty-Five Years of Rock 'N' Roll Style (1983)
- Queen: The Magic Years (1987)
- Imagine: John Lennon (1988)
- Superstar: The Life and Times of Andy Warhol (1990)
- Travelling Light (1992)
- The Time Life History Of Rock N' Roll (1995)
- Inspirations (1997)
- Lou Reed: Rock and Roll Heart (1998)
- Mayor of the Sunset Strip (2003)
- Scott Walker: 30 Century Man (2006)

=== As producer ===
- Bűvös vadász (1994) (aka Magic Hunter)
- Passaggio per il paradiso (1998) (aka Gentle Into the Night or Passage to Paradise)
- Scott Walker: 30 Century Man (2006)

== Stage ==
=== As actor ===
- Pierrot in Turquoise (1967–1968) – UK national tour
- The Elephant Man (1980–1981) as John Merrick – US national tour and Booth Theatre, Broadway

=== As writer/composer ===
- Pierrot in Turquoise (1967) – songs by David Bowie
- Lazarus (2015) – music and lyrics by David Bowie

=== As producer ===
- Hedwig and the Angry Inch (1999 Los Angeles production) – associate producer

=== Additional stage works featuring David Bowie compositions ===
- Rock 'N Roll! The First 5,000 Years (1982) – "Space Oddity"
- We Will Rock You (2002) – "Under Pressure"
- SpongeBob SquarePants (2016) – "No Control"
- Tina (2018) – "Tonight"

== See also ==
- David Bowie videography – Bowie's appearances in music-related film.
