= Rebel Country =

2024 American documentary

- Directed by: Francis Whately
- Produced by: Francis Whately; Janet Lee; Gabriel Jagger
- Cinematography: Louis Caulfield
- Edited by: Mike Duly
- Music by: Nick Watson
- Production companies: BMG; Why Now Studios
- Release date: June 10, 2024 (US)
- Running time: 81 minutes
- Country: United States
- Language: English

Rebel Country is a 2024 American country music documentary film produced and directed by Francis Whately. The film features country music singers Jelly Roll, Sam Williams, Lainey Wilson, Chely Wright, and Frank Ray. The film had its debut in June 2024, at the Tribeca Film Festival.

== Synopsis ==
The film explores the new generation of country music singers who are redefining the culture of the music genre. It takes a deep dive into the diversity of musicians in the field, including Black, Mexican-American and LGBTQ country singers. The film also looks at the history of segregation associated with the country music industry.

== Cast ==
- Jake Blount
- Breland
- Blanco Brown
- Lindsay Ell
- Rissi Palmer
- Frank Ray
- Jelly Roll
- Sam Williams
- Lainey Wilson
- Chely Wright

== Background ==
Director Francis Whately said his aim of the film was to show "this current moment that the country music genre is experiencing". He also interviewed various singers, music journalists, historians, and used archival footage in the documentary to illustrate the past and present of the music genre. Sam Williams, who's the grandson of Hank Williams, is featured in the film and he talks about "challenging the status quo in country music by embracing his sexuality". Williams came out in 2022 during the filming of his "Tilted Crown" music video. He said at the time, he thought it was the "perfect opportunity to just show who I was."

== Release ==
Rebel Country premiered at the Tribeca Film Festival on June 10, 2024. Following the premier, there was a musical performance by Breland. In July, it was one of two opening films screened at the Nashville Film Festival. Fremantle is handling worldwide sales distribution.

== Reception ==
The Cinema Spot said the film "does not shy away from the important discussions that need to happen regarding race, sexuality, and sexism within the genre". They also noted the film encourages "singers to not be afraid of speaking out against bigotry" in the industry. Cinemacy highlighted a segment in the film where it examines Lil Nas X's debut of "Old Town Road", and how it was "rescinded from appearing on the Billboard Hot Country Songs chart due to not being 'country enough'." They also opined that while "country music is far more diverse today than ever ... that doesn't mean the genre should be free from criticism".

Film Threat notes the opening of the film where it shows a "reenactment of Jelly Roll being led out of a bar by the cops in handcuffs ... and when the cops bring him into the county jail, instead of throwing him in a cell, they bring him onstage in an auditorium to perform for the prisoners". They also commented that Jelly Roll is "outspoken on the idea that all country music is outlaw art, and how he feels it is music for the outcasts, rebels, and pioneers of this country". Edge Media Network said the film shows that the "new crop" of country music singers "happens to be Black, Hispanic, queer, and proudly female". They also discussed the interview in the film with Sam Williams, and how he had it "easier [when he came out], than Chely Wright did when she came out and her fellow artists shunned her".

Dwight Brown rated it 3 out of 4, praising the director, saying he "pulls the curtains back on the country music scene, and goes backstage where budding Black, Latino, LGBQT+, female artists and innovators are rocking the genre to its core."

On Rotten Tomatoes it has an 100% rating based on reviews from 5 critics.

== See also ==
- Bro-country
- Country music
- List of country music performers
- Music of the United States
