= David Bowie: Finding Fame =

2019 British documentary

- Directed by: Francis Whately
- Written by: Francis Whately
- Produced by: Phil Dolling; Francis Whately
- Cinematography: Louis Caulfield; Richard Numeroff
- Edited by: Ged Murphy
- Production companies: BBC Studios; BBC Music
- Distributed by: BBC Two (UK); Showtime (US)
- Release dates: 9 February 2019 (UK); 9 August 2019 (US)
- Running time: 90 minutes
- Country: United Kingdom
- Language: English

David Bowie: Finding Fame, also known as David Bowie: The First Five Years, is a 2019 British documentary written and directed by Francis Whately. The film explores a period of David Bowie's career starting in 1965, around the time he dropped his stage name of Davie Jones in favor of Bowie, to 1973, when he dropped the Ziggy Stardust persona. It premiered in the United Kingdom on 9 February 2019 on BBC Two, and made its debut in the United States on 9 August 2019 on Showtime.

The film is the third and final installment by Whately in his series about the iconic singer, with the first two in the trilogy being David Bowie: Five Years in 2013, and David Bowie: The Last Five Years in 2017. Bowie is a five-time Grammy winner; was honored with a Grammy Lifetime Achievement Award, and his 1972 single "Changes" was inducted into the Grammy Hall of Fame. His career took off with the 1969 hit song "Space Oddity, which peaked at number five on the UK Albums Chart, and it was also used as background music by British television stations during the 1969 moon landing.

== Synopsis ==
The film is the final installment in a trilogy of Bowie documentaries. It examines a period of Bowie's early career from 1965 through 1973. It features archival footage of interviews with Bowie; commentary from his collaborators in the early days; exclusive interviews with two of his former girlfriends; and unseen footage from the BBC. It also highlights his first hit in the United Kingdom, "Space Oddity" in 1969, and his groundbreaking performance of "Starman" on Top of the Pops in 1972.

== Cast ==
- David Bowie
- Phil Lancaster
- Denis Taylor
- Tony Hatch
- Geoff MacCormack
- George Underwood
- John "Hutch" Hutchinson
- Dana Gillespie
- Mark Plati
- Earl Slick
- Gail Ann Dorsey
- Del Roll
- Butch Davis
- Kenneth Pitt
- Gus Dudgeon
- Carlos Alomar
- Mike Vernon
- Kristina Amadeus
- Lindsay Kemp
- Hermione Farthingale
- Bob Harris
- Tony Visconti
- Ray Stevenson
- Rick Wakeman
- John Cambridge
- Mick Woodmansey
- John Coleman
- Mike Garson

== Background ==
As in his previous documentaries, director Francis Whately used Bowie's own words, archival footage and commentary from friends and colleagues. Whatley said making the documentary gave him a chance to "tell the story of the singer's earlier years, which was previously denied him". He said that when he was directing one of the episodes for the BBC Two series, the Seven Ages of Rock, he wanted then to cover Bowie's earliest years, but was denied the opportunity by BBC executives. Whately said he was "delighted" when he was finally green-lit by BBC to make this film. He believes this early period he covers in the film "is a lost period", and "it stands up and makes sense of everything that went after ... because it's about a man trying to make it. It's a man picking himself up off the floor". Whately was able to snag some exclusive interviews as well for the film, featuring Bowie's cousin Kristina Amadeus, and former girlfriends Dana Gillespie and Hermione Farthingale. The film also marked Lindsay Kemps last interview, just ten days before he died. Photographer Ray Stevenson is interviewed too, who only took black-and-white photographs of Bowie in the 1960s because, as he put it, "why would I waste colour on someone who wasn't going anywhere?" Some of the rare footage shown includes his 1973 gig in Hammersmith, West London, where Bowie famously announced that it was the Spiders From Mars' last show. The announcement stunned bass guitarist Trevor Bolder, and drummer Mick Woodmansey, who had no idea that Bowie was going to make that declaration. The film also includes audio from a 1971 Glastonbury performance.

External image
- 1965 BBC audition
- BBC audition report via the New Musical Express

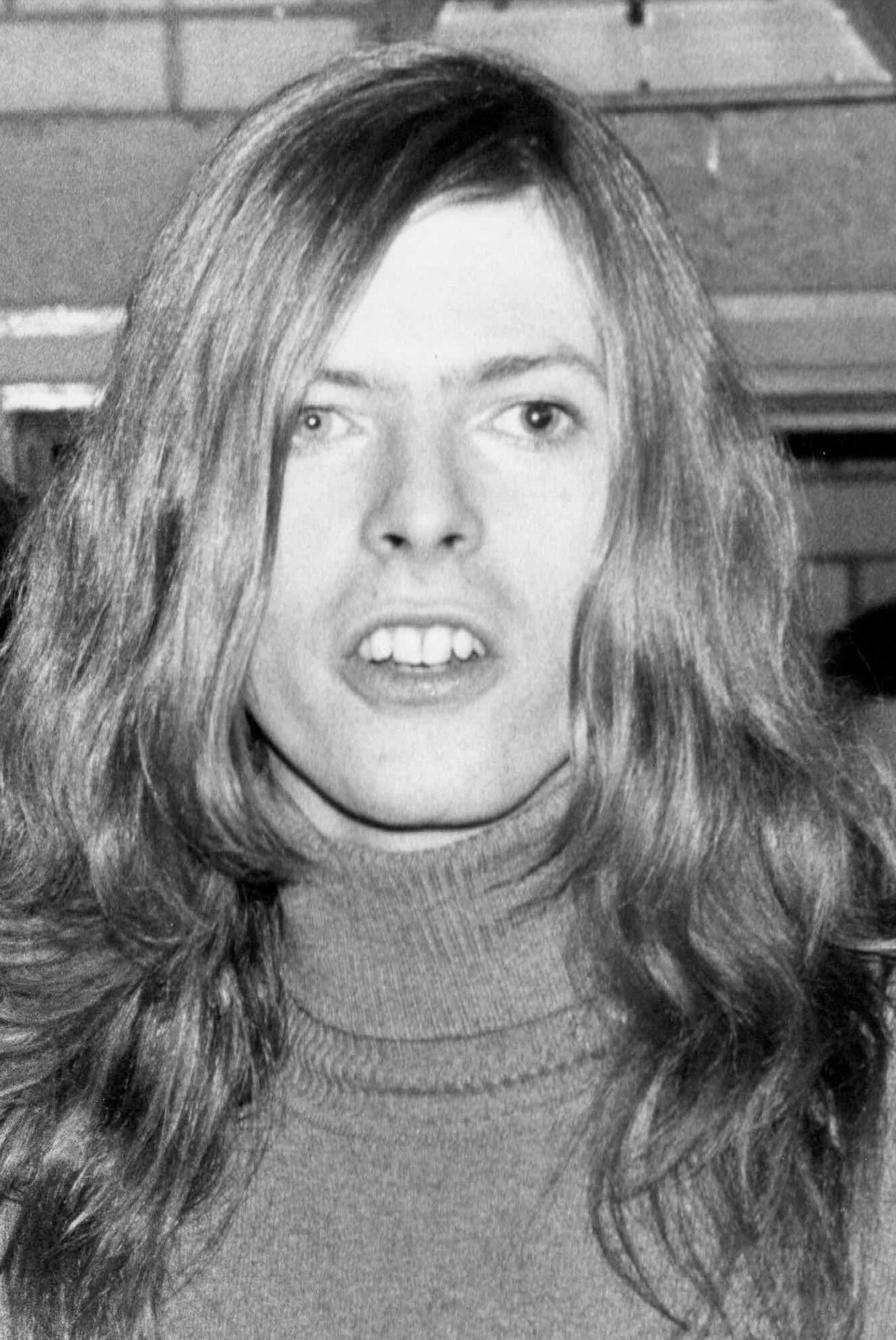
David Bowie photographed in 1971, showing that distinct permanently-dilated pupil. It can also be seen here in a photograph from 1967.

Phil Lancaster, interviewed early on in the film, was a bandmate from Bowie's fourth band he was part of in 1965, The Lower Third. He tells the story of when they auditioned for the BBC. They performed three numbers: "Out of Sight", "Baby that's a Promise" (original song written by Bowie) and "Chim Chim Cher-ee". The panel who judged their audition wrote a scathing review of their performance, saying among other things: "amateur sounding vocalist who sings wrong notes and out of tune", and that the band was "very ordinary too, backing a singer devoid of personality", referring to Bowie. The talent selection group who wrote the report was responsible for ensuring that groups met its quality standards before they were put on BBC radio.

In another interview to NME, his childhood friend George Underwood, who played guitar and sang vocals with Bowie in the band Davie Jones with the King Bees (Bowie was still using his real name, David Jones, at the time), tells the story of how, in 1962, he was the one who gave Bowie "those mismatched, alien eyes". Underwood says that Bowie cockblocked him when they both fancied the same girl. Underwood tells how Bowie sabotaged a date that he had set up with her, and then later he heard Bowie bragging about his "conquest on a bus" with her. Understandably mad, Underwood says, "it wasn't really my style, but I just walked up to him and hit him". Underwood recalls that a week later his dad delivered the bad news that Bowie has been taken to Moorfields Eye Hospital, and might lose an eye. Underwood said he "was in bits, it was horrible, but it all ended up alright in the end, didn't it". As a result of Underwood's punch, Bowie ended up with a permanently-dilated pupil that "gave Bowie those extraterrestrial, Ziggy Stardust eyes". Underwood says that Bowie told him later that "he did him a favour". The King Bees’ first single, "Liza Jane", turned out to be a flop for the young Bowie.

"Space Oddity"
Unreleased demo of "Space Oddity", with both Bowie and John Hutchinson singing lead vocals.

The film also documents his first hit in the UK, "Space Oddity". In January 1969, a demo of "Space Oddity" was recorded that is vastly different from the album version. This early demo features Bowie and British guitarist John Hutchinson sharing the lead vocals. Hutchinson says Bowie "wrote it as a song for two people, Ground Control and Major Tom. Bowie would sing the lead and I would come up with the easiest way for me to sound right as the harmony voice". The demo also had different lyrics. Instead of the phrase "lift-off" (in the final released version), the lyrics heard are "blast-off". Additionally, the lyric "I'm floating in a most peculiar way" (in the final released version) is replaced with "Can I please get back inside now, if I may?" Bowie's longtime American record producer Tony Visconti said when he first heard the demo he didn't like it, so he handed it off to Gus Dudgeon to produce. Visconti said what makes the song work is "drama. The first thing you hear is an ominous 12-string guitar fade up from nothing ... it's drama and you are sucked into it". He goes on to say that they used what was at the time a "revolutionary" new instrument, the stylophone. Rick Wakeman, who played the mellotron on the track, says Bowie wanted it because he wanted it to "sound not like strings, but like strings, and I knew exactly what he meant". He also jokingly stated, "which I have nicked ever since to use on Yes records" when he was the keyboardist for the band. Bowie said that when he wrote it he thought it was related to himself a lot more than anything he'd written up until then. He's heard on archival footage in the film, clarifying;

There was something about it that touched areas of my fears about my own insecurities socially and maybe emotionally. This feeling of isolation that I had ever since I was a kid was really starting to manifest itself. I think the isolation of the film 2001: A Space Odyssey made itself very obvious when I wrote the song “Space Oddity”, because for the first time I really felt a sense of how you could write as an isolationist. I thought, well, gee, I am Major Tom. Here I am in my own cosmic space, and nobody can possibly understand what it's like to be out here on this umbilical cord attached to my craft.

In July 1969, the final version of "Space Oddity" was finally released. It was Bowie's first hit, reaching number five on the UK charts. Visconti says when the single hit the charts, that's where the change came, where he started seeing himself as a star. Hutchinson, who is heard on the demo, says by the time it was finally released he had already left the band and was in a drawing office by then. The song was also notably used on British television as background music for the moon landing in 1969. Bowie later mused "I'm sure they really weren't listening to the lyric at all; it wasn't a pleasant thing to juxtapose against a moon landing ... Of course, I was overjoyed that they did ... Nobody had the heart to tell them: Um, but he gets stranded in space".

External videos
- David Bowie: Starman
- David Bowie: Starman, Top Of The Pops, 1972, authorized by Warner Chappell Music

In January 2019, Whately reported that Bowie's debut of his Ziggy Stardust character on ITV's British television series Lift Off with Ayshea had been found. Whately said, "For fans, it is something of a 'Holy Grail', because it was long thought to have been erased". Whately said the newly discovered footage had been recorded by a fan at the show, but due to the degradation of the video tape, it had to be gradually "baked" in a special apparatus to ensure it could be restored to a suitable quality for playback. Whately said he hoped it would be ready in time for the film's release. According to music journalist Mark Savage from BBC News, "Bowie's performance of "Starman" on Top of the Pops in 1972 is considered a watershed moment in musical history". Savage reported that when Bowie put his arm around Mick Ronson during the performance, it "shocked viewers and ushered in an era of glamour and androgyny". Bowie said he wrote the song "in about 15 minutes. I used every cliched phrase I could think of to do with star men and people in space, and 'let the children boogie’ and all that ... shove it in, three minutes and on a nice tune". As to how the original footage from the show was destroyed, Ayshea Brough, the host of Lift Off, explained that they had requested a technician to digitally transfer the tapes. She said that they had marked the ones intended for wiping with an X, but the technician did the exact opposite and wiped all the tapes without an X, destroying "years of my life and performances, and everybody else's performances". When the film was released a month later in February, the footage from Top of the Pops was used in the segment about "Starman". In 2024, additional unseen footage of "Starman" was discovered that had been filmed by Mick Rock during the 1972 to 1973 United Kingdom tour of Ziggy Stardust.

The Guardian highlights another scene in the film where Bowie is asking members of The Lower Third to wear makeup in order to emulate "groovy mod bands in London", who Bowie thought looked cool. But as Denis Taylor recalls, Graham Rivens, the bassist, “said 'fuck that', which is why the world has never heard of The Lower Third".

== Release ==
The film had its premiere on 9 February 2019 on BBC Two, and then made its debut in the United States on 9 August 2019 on Showtime. As of December 2024, it is also available for streaming on multiple platforms.

== Reception ==
There is no entertainment in anything they do. It's just a group, and very ordinary too, backing a singer devoid of personality.

— BBC review of David Bowie and The Lower Third
(23 November 1965)

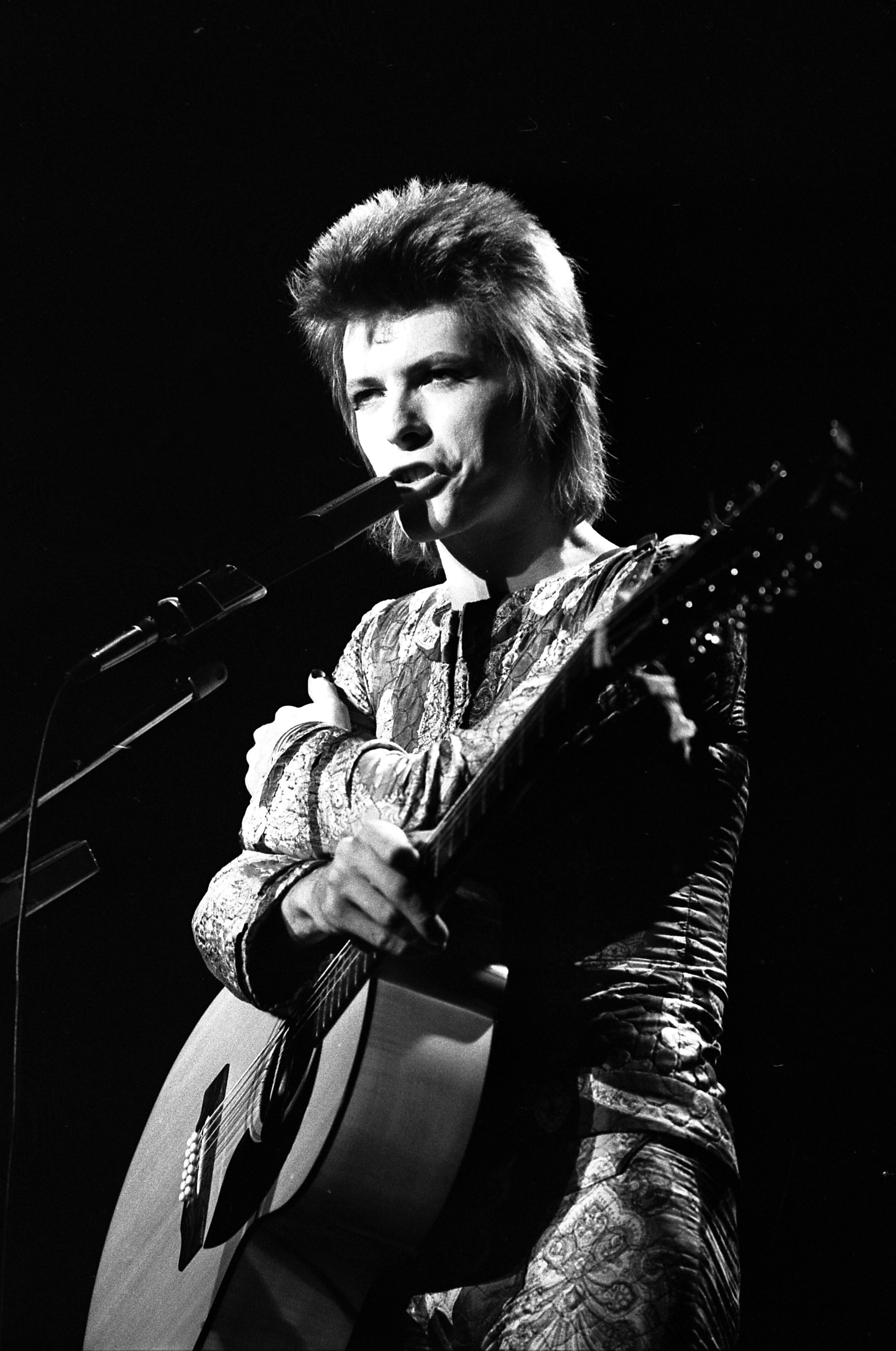
David Bowie, pictured on his Ziggy Stardust Tour in 1972

Carol Midgley of The Times wrote that "while many documentaries about dead geniuses comprise galleries of gushing talking heads competing for superlatives, this was largely about failure". She says the film "detailed meticulously how hard Bowie grafted from the 1960s while facing repeated rejection, flops, poor sales and bored audiences .... the BBC's 'talent selection group' had dismissed him as 'devoid of personality' ... yet Bowie doubled down and worked harder, emerging to stupendous fame as Ziggy Stardust". She concluded by stating "Whately's access to quality interviewees and exquisite rare footage revealed an adorably shy, modest megastar ... and that a film highlighting his failures did not undermine his icon status, and in some ways enhanced it, shows how safe is Bowie's crown".

In his review for The Guardian, Stewart Jeffries said "there were some pretty tough moments in the film". In particular, he points to Bowie's attempts at miming, which Lindsay Kemp referred to as "a lot of shit". He highlights another moment in the film where Bowie convinced members of his band Riot Squad to do a new take on the Velvet Underground's "I'm Waiting for the Man"; "they performed a sort of homosexual conga on stage while, unless I misheard, Bowie sang: 'I'm just waiting for a good friendly behind' ... sweet, but probably not what Lou Reed meant at all".

In his five star review for The Arts Desk, Howard Male stated, the film "is a hypnotic, multilayered work that's never self-indulgent and always completely engaging, the film could stand alone as a perfect introduction to the thin white enigma, in fact it may even be the best of this admirable trilogy, it's certainly the most touching". Roison O'Connor was lukewarm in her review for The Independent, they question "whether any of his fans really want to 'make sense' of David Bowie". They point out that "like Prince and Kurt Cobain, Bowie's allure is that he is, above all, an enigma, who as much as we relate to or adore, will never truly understand, and the film admitted as much, with its final impression of Bowie being one of a man who was, essentially, unknowable, so the fact Whatley is attempting – unsuccessfully – to undo that in his final documentary, is rather odd in itself".

Suzi Feay wrote in the Financial Times, that out of the three documentaries Whately has made about Bowie, this one "is by far the most intriguing, with new interviewees, previously unheard audio, touching family photos, all painting a suggestive portrait of an anxious, withdrawn childhood and youth". Benjamin Smith writing for Decider said "Whately knows his subject well and coaxes his story out of his friends and collaborators with skill and affection, what emerges is a portrait of a man who knew what he wanted from an early age and used the ensuing years to bring it into clearer focus". Peter Crawley of The Irish Times opined that "it's sobering to wonder, though, if an artist of Bowie's magnitude could emerge again – one given the opportunity to fail, and fail again, towards success ... perhaps creative restlessness persists no matter what, and for that reason Whately leaves us with the public immolation of Ziggy Stardust, singing "Rock 'n' Roll Suicide" ... there was someone else David Bowie needed to be".

On Rotten Tomatoes it has an approval rating of 100% based on reviews from 8 critics.

== Accolades ==
It won the Outstanding Achievement in Sound Mixing award at the Cinema Audio Society Awards in 2020.

== See also ==
- David Bowie discography
- David Bowie filmography
- List of songs recorded by David Bowie

== Sources ==
- Various Colleagues and Friends (2019). David Bowie: Finding Fame (video). Francis Whately (director). BBC – via The Internet Archive.
