= Death of David Bowie =

2016 death of English musician and actor

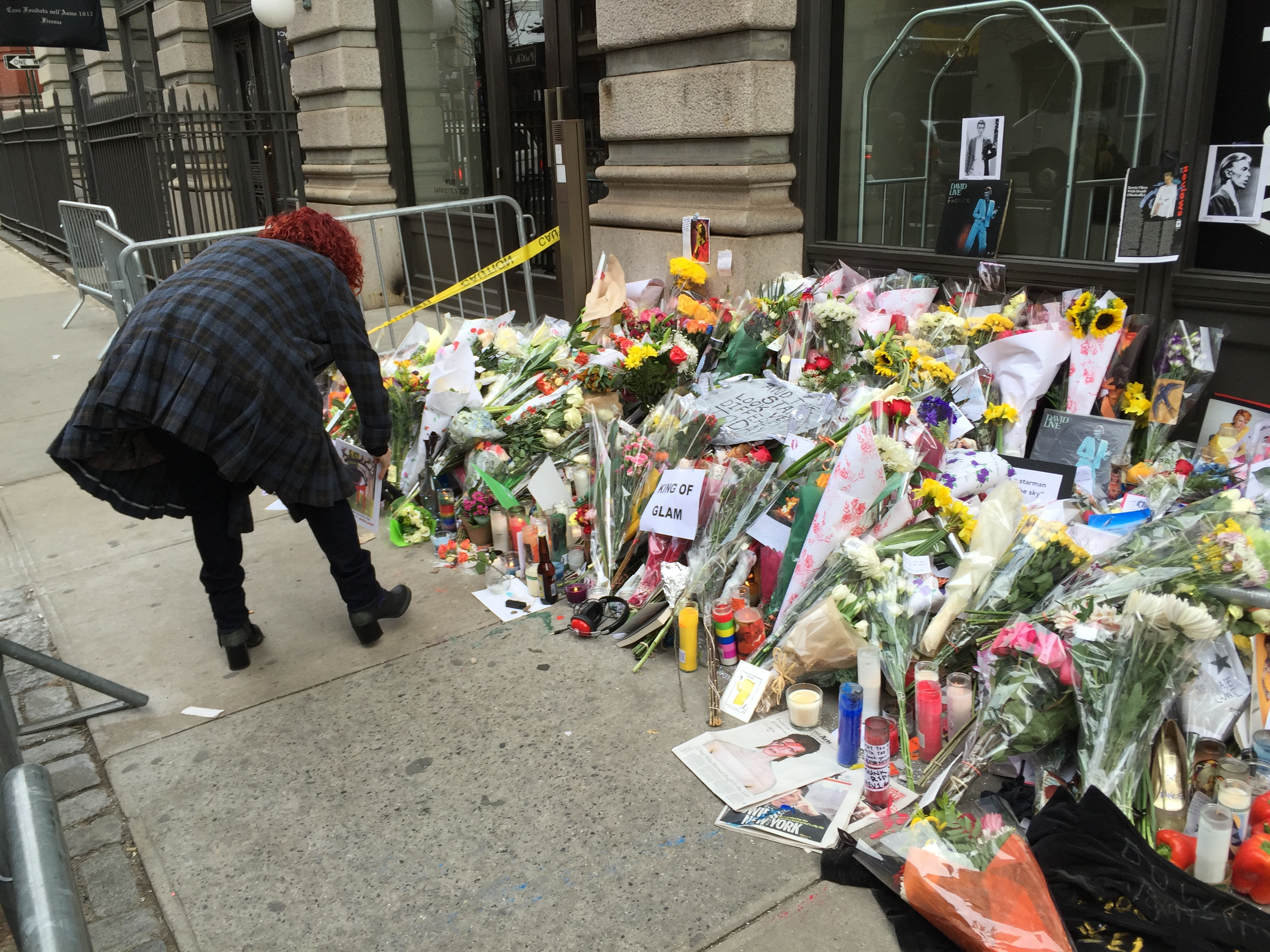
- Flowers outside Bowie's New York apartment
- Date: 10 January 2016; 10 years ago
- Location: New York City, US

On 10 January 2016, the English singer, songwriter and actor David Bowie died at his Lafayette Street home in New York City, having been diagnosed with liver cancer 18 months earlier. He died two days after the release of his twenty-sixth and final studio album, Blackstar, which coincided with his 69th birthday.

Bowie kept his illness private, and friends and fans alike were surprised by his death. Makeshift memorials were created in London, New York City, Berlin and other cities in which Bowie had lived; sales of his albums and singles saw a significant increase. Numerous musicians and public figures also expressed their grief. Many commentators noted Bowie's impact on music, fashion and culture, and wrote of his status as one of the most influential musical artists of all time.

== Timeline ==
Bowie released his twenty-fifth studio album The Next Day in early 2013 after having secretly recorded it over the previous two years, surprising fans and critics who had assumed that he had retired. Following its release, he went back into the studio to begin work on his next and what was to be final album, Blackstar. In June and July 2014, Bowie recorded his single "Sue (Or in a Season of Crime)" and around this time, Bowie was diagnosed with liver cancer. He told only his family and people he was working with at the time about his condition; Ivo van Hove, with whom Bowie was collaborating on the off-Broadway musical Lazarus, was told shortly after Bowie himself found out. Tony Visconti, Bowie's friend and producer of many Bowie albums, including Blackstar, was told in January 2015. Visconti recalled that Bowie was completely bald from his chemotherapy when they spoke. Other musicians who worked with Bowie to record Blackstar said that, during recording, they did not know he was sick.

By mid-2015, as the studio sessions for Blackstar were completed, it was hoped that the cancer was in remission, but by November 2015, around the time his single "Blackstar" was released, the cancer had spread throughout his body and Bowie was told by his doctors that his condition was terminal. He was in the middle of filming the video for his song "Lazarus" when the decision was made to end his cancer treatment. Bowie reportedly wrote a five-year plan for what he wanted done with his music after he died, and his last public appearance was at the 7 December 2015 opening night of his musical Lazarus. Bowie released his final studio album Blackstar on 8 January 2016, his 69th birthday.

Bowie died on 10 January 2016, and his Facebook page posted the following message: "Jan. 10, 2016 – David Bowie died peacefully today surrounded by his family after a courageous 18-month battle with cancer. While many of you will share in this loss, we ask that you respect the family's privacy during their time of grief."

Many musicians who had worked with Bowie over the years, such as Mike Garson, Gerry Leonard, Brian Eno, Nile Rodgers, Reeves Gabrels, Tina Turner, Iggy Pop, Sterling Campbell, Earl Slick and Gail Ann Dorsey, had not been told about his illness and were surprised when Bowie died.

On 12 January 2016, in accordance with his will, Bowie was cremated in New Jersey, and his ashes were scattered in accordance with Buddhist rituals in Bali, Indonesia. Bowie had vacationed in Bali in the 1980s and had written the song "Tumble and Twirl" about his exploits there.

A few days after his death, a letter speculating about his final moments was published by palliative care doctor Mark Taubert (who had not been involved in Bowie's palliative care). The letter was initially published in BMJ Supportive & Palliative Care and then the Independent Newspaper and was shared by David Bowie's son Duncan Jones. It was published in newsrooms worldwide and addresses issues such as palliative care and planning for the end of life. Bowie's story became a way to communicate important aspects of dying with a palliative care patient. Dylan Jones included the letter in his Bowie biography David Bowie – A Life.

== Reaction ==
=== David Bowie Is ===
David Bowie Is was a travelling museum show that displayed the history, artifacts and information about Bowie's life and works. The show, which ran from 2013 through 2018, was at the Groninger Museum in the Netherlands when Bowie died, and as a result the museum considered cancelling the show, and there were also discussions as to whether to keep the name in the present tense (David Bowie Is). The decision was made instead to extend the show for 4 weeks to allow grieving fans to attend.

=== Fans ===
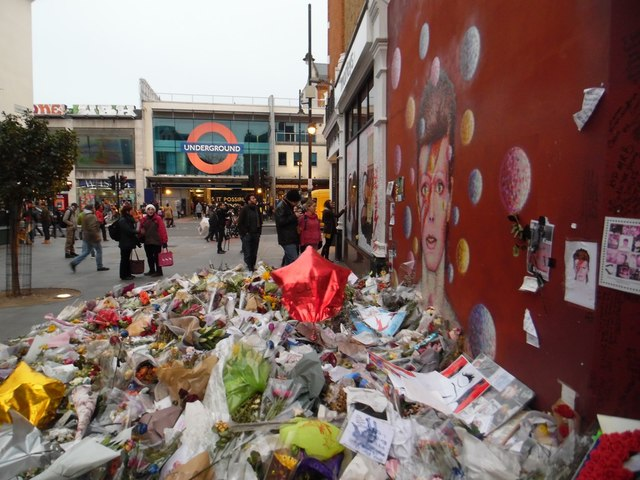
Flowers left at the mural in Brixton, 7 February 2016

Memorials to Bowie were created around the world in the hours following his death. In Brixton, the London area in which Bowie was born, a mural painted in 2013 by Australian artist Jimmy C became a shrine at which fans left flowers, records and handwritten messages. As well as leaving flowers, fans gathered in the streets of Brixton on the evening of the 11th of January to sing together and celebrate his life and works. Over 5,000 people marked themselves as 'attending' on the Facebook event. The crowds feature in footage at the start and end of David Bowie: The Last Five Years, a BBC documentary about the last five years of Bowie's life. The mural features Bowie as he appeared on his iconic Aladdin Sane album cover, with a red and blue stripe appearing diagonally across his face as if it had been painted upon it.

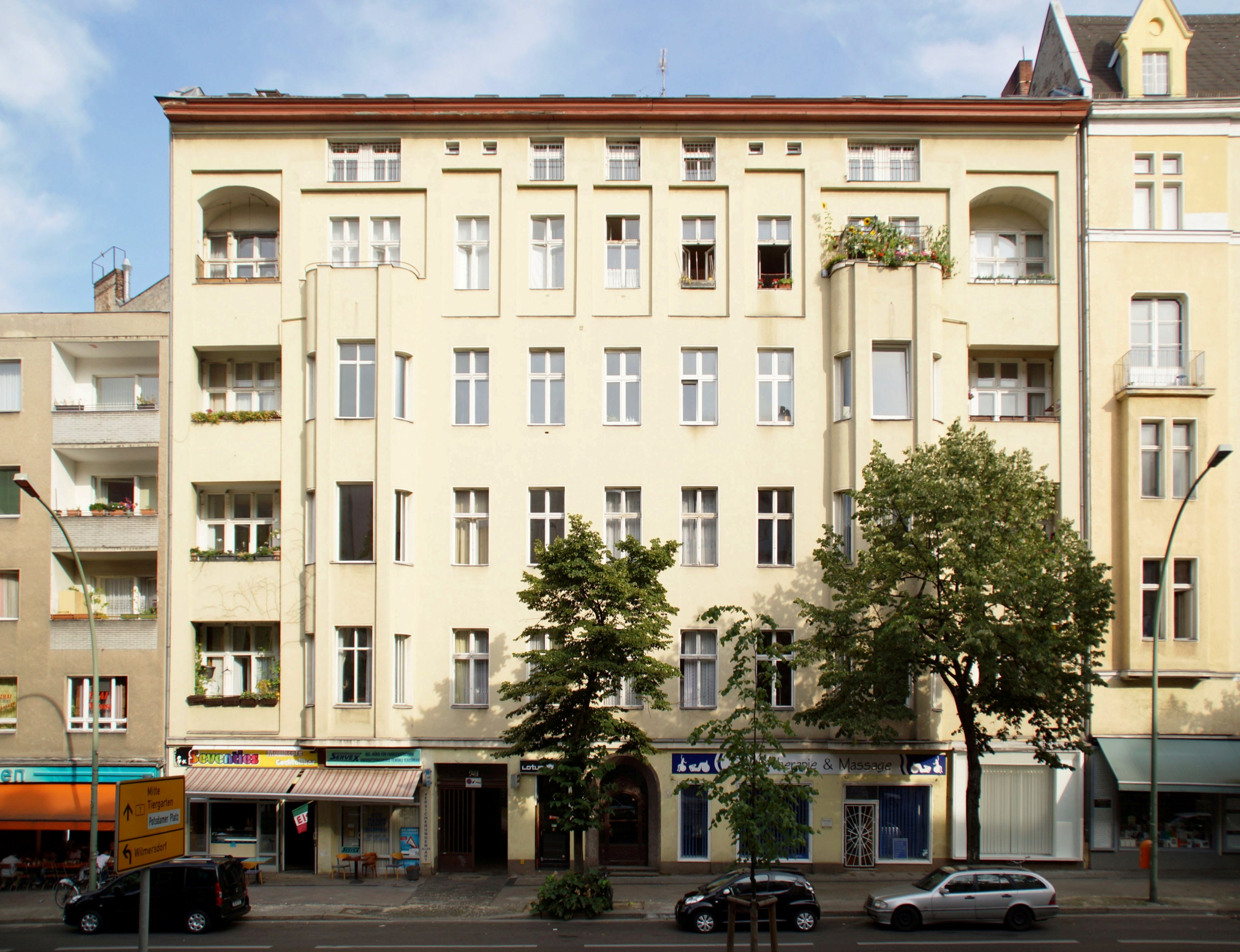
Apartment building at Hauptstraße 155, Schöneberg, Berlin, where Bowie lived from 1976 to 1978. Following his death, fans created makeshift shrines outside of the building.

In Berlin, fans left flowers outside the flat in which Bowie and Iggy Pop had lived while Bowie created his seminal "Berlin trilogy" of albums—Low, "Heroes" and Lodger—in the late 1970s as well as Pop's albums The Idiot and Lust for Life (which Bowie produced). Flowers were also left outside Bowie's New York City apartment and next to his star on the Hollywood Walk of Fame in Los Angeles. In Milan, fans held a flash mob memorial service in Colonne di San Lorenzo while fans in Rio de Janeiro paid tribute to Bowie in February's Rio Carnival. In Japan, hours after Bowie's death, a devoted fan was detained for threatening to commit suicide with a box cutter in public.

=== Other musicians ===
Tony Visconti, who produced a number of Bowie's albums including the "Berlin trilogy", Young Americans, and Bowie's final studio album, Blackstar, wrote: "He always did what he wanted to do. And he wanted to do it his way and he wanted to do it the best way. His death was no different from his life—a work of art. He made Blackstar for us, his parting gift. I knew for a year this was the way it would be. I wasn't, however, prepared for it. He was an extraordinary man, full of love and life. He will always be with us. For now, it is appropriate to cry".

Mick Jagger said, "David was always an inspiration to me and a true original. He was wonderfully shameless in his work. We had so many good times together ... He was my friend. I will never forget him".

Friend and collaborator Iggy Pop described him on social media as "the light of my life". The following month, he performed two Bowie songs at the 2016 Tibet House Benefit Concert.

Singer-songwriter Madonna tweeted: "Talented. Unique. Genius. Game Changer" and sang "Rebel, Rebel" at her Houston concert.

Queen, with whom he collaborated on "Under Pressure", tweeted a link to the video of the song, with the words: "This is our last dance...."

Elton John commented that "we all know how inspiring he is. We all know that his music stands. We don't have to say anything about the music: it speaks for itself. He was innovative, he was boundary-changing, and he danced to his own tune—which in any artist is really rare". John also performed a cover of "Space Oddity" at the Wiltern Theater in Los Angeles two days after Bowie's death.

Peter Gabriel wrote, in part, "He was a one-off, a brilliant outlier, always exploring, challenging and inspiring anyone who wanted to push the boundaries of music, art, fashion and society".

Kate Bush, noted for rarely giving public statements, told The Guardian in an interview: "David Bowie had everything. He was intelligent, imaginative, brave, charismatic, cool, sexy and truly inspirational both visually and musically. He created such staggeringly brilliant work, yes, but so much of it and it was so good. There are great people who make great work but who else has left a mark like his? No one like him".

Dave Gahan of Depeche Mode said, "I had seen the news but it wasn't until my wife told me he had died that I just broke down in tears. My daughter came out and they were both hugging me. It really affected me. I felt a huge gap. One of the things I was most regrettable about was that I had never really gone up to him at any time I'd seen him in passing and said, 'You know, David, I bump into you every once in a while, but I've never told you how much your music has meant to me and continues to mean to me.'"

The Who honoured Bowie during their concert of 3 March 2016 at New York's Madison Square Garden with images of Bowie and noting "We'll miss our friend, a true icon of music and art, and a brilliant innovator."

Billy Corgan of the Smashing Pumpkins told Vulture, "When a true star blinks out, the sky looks different and never feels the same.”

Ozzy Osbourne of Black Sabbath referred to him as, "one of the greats."

Michael Stipe of R.E.M. wrote, "Right now, it feels as if the solar system is off its axis, as if one of our main planetary anchors has lost its orbit. That said—I am certain that wherever Bowie is now—I want to be there someday."

Debbie Harry said "Who doesn't love Bowie? A visionary artist, musician, actor, a completely renaissance man who has given us a long list of songs like 'Heroes,' 'Rebel Rebel,' 'Young Americans,' 'Diamond Dogs,' 'The Jean Genie,' and some memorable film performances like The Man Who Fell to Earth, Basquiat, Labyrinth, The Hunger. I can't say enough things about David Bowie to show how much I love him."

Paul McCartney, meanwhile, shared a picture of him and Bowie together on Instagram and commented that "David was a great star and I treasure the moments we had together. His music played a very strong part in British musical history and I'm proud to think of the huge influence he has had on people all around the world".

Bruce Springsteen commented "Over here on E Street, we're feeling the great loss of David Bowie. David was a visionary artist and an early supporter of our music. Always changing and ahead of the curve, he was an artist whose excellence you aspired to. He will be sorely missed." Bowie had previously recorded cover versions of Springsteen's songs "Growin' Up" and "It's Hard to Be a Saint in the City" early on in Springsteen's career. On the opening night of The River Tour 2016 in Pittsburgh on 16 January, Springsteen & the E Street Band opened their encore with a cover of "Rebel Rebel".

Yoko Ono noted Bowie's friendship with herself and John Lennon, and thanked him for being a "father figure" to her son Sean following Lennon's death.

=== Angie Bowie's Celebrity Big Brother incident ===
At the time of Bowie's death, his ex-wife Angie was competing as a housemate on the seventeenth series of Celebrity Big Brother in the United Kingdom. After the show's producers informed her of his death off camera, Angie returned to the house and confided in fellow housemate Tiffany Pollard, exclaiming "David's dead". Pollard however thought she was referring to David Gest, another housemate on the show who had been unwell for several days. Pollard became hysterical, resulting in other housemates going to check on Gest, who was in the bedroom asleep. Angie decided to voluntarily leave the house a week later, following Gest who had left for medical reasons two days earlier. Gest died three months later.

=== Homages from outside of popular culture ===
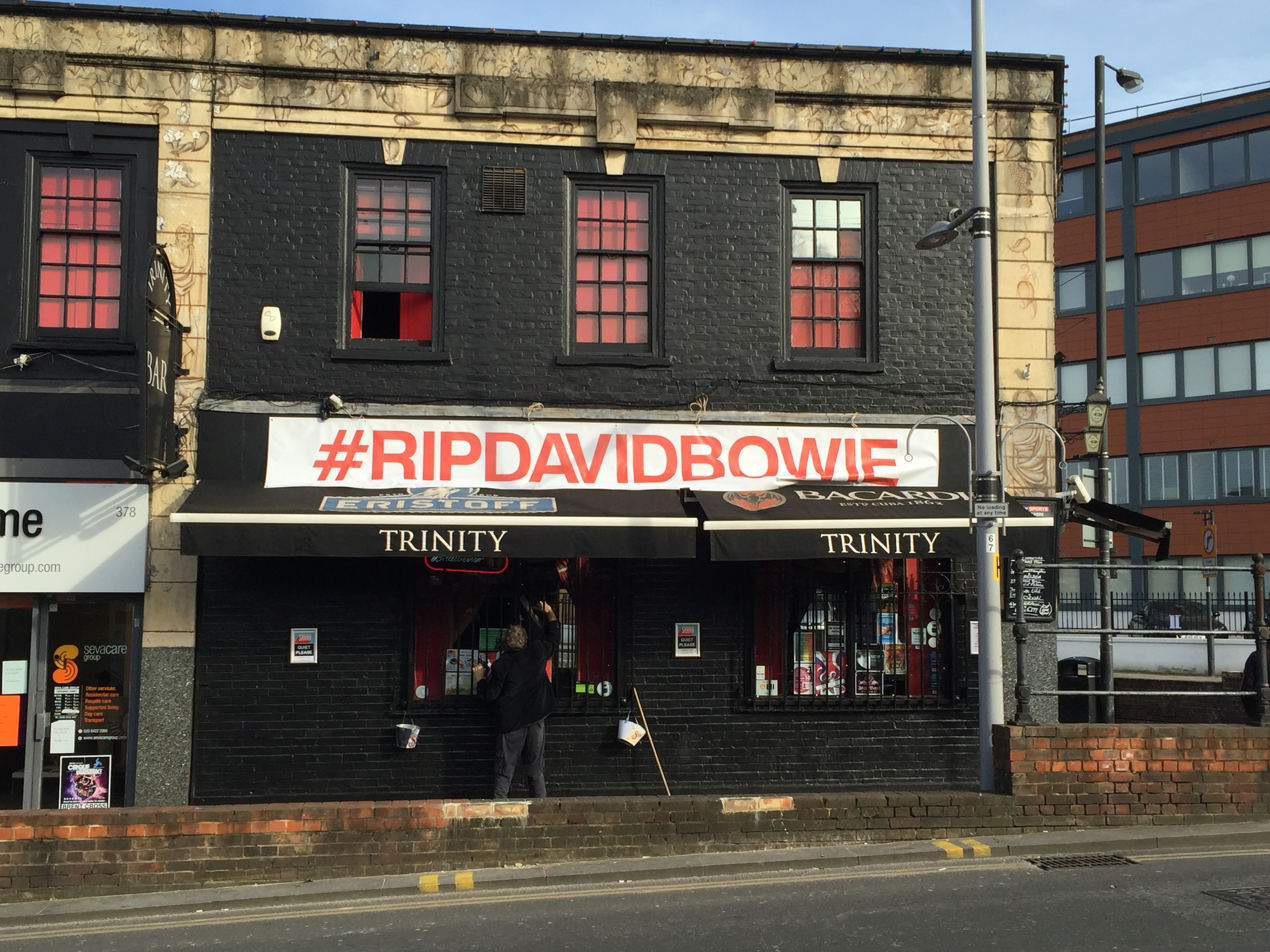
A banner paying tribute to David Bowie on the Trinity Bar in Harrow, UK

British Prime Minister David Cameron paid tribute to Bowie, calling him "an immense British talent" and stating "musically, creatively, artistically, David Bowie was a genius".

The German Foreign Office tweeted "Good-bye, David Bowie. You are now among #Heroes. Thank you for helping to bring down the #wall", referencing Bowie's time in Berlin in the 1970s as well as his 1987 concert near the Berlin wall.

Vatican Cardinal Gianfranco Ravasi tweeted some of the words to Bowie's song "Space Oddity" in memoriam after Bowie's death.

Given the astronomical theme of several of his works, tributes came from numerous astronauts and astronomers, including Chris Hadfield and Neil deGrasse Tyson. NASA tweeted "The stars look very different today" from their Twitter account, directly quoting "Space Oddity".

== Analysis of Blackstar ==
Bowie's final album, Blackstar—styled as ★ on the cover—was heavily analysed following his death, and numerous supposed clues about Bowie's fate were discussed. The album's second single "Lazarus" includes the lyrics "Look up here, I'm in heaven/I've got scars that can't be seen", which appeared in numerous news publications after his death. The album's title was believed to have symbolised death; it is the name given to a cancerous lesion, as well as the term for the transitional state between a collapsed star and a singularity. It is reminiscent of "Black Star" (released as "Flaming Star" when the movie it was tied to was renamed), a song about death by one of Bowie's musical idols, Elvis Presley, which features the lyrics "When a man sees his black star, he knows his time has come". The video for "Lazarus" included visuals of Bowie retreating into a wooden cupboard, and writing with a skull on his desk—seemed to many to symbolise Bowie's imminent death.

Other lyrics were scrutinised; the track "Dollar Days", for example, featured the line, "Don't believe for just one second I'm forgetting you/I'm trying to/I'm dying to". The title and refrain of the album's final track, "I Can't Give Everything Away", was believed by some commentators to refer to Bowie keeping his imminent fate private whilst hinting at it throughout the album, while its use of the harmonica solo from "A New Career in a New Town"—an instrumental track on Bowie's 1977 album Low which refers to his move to Berlin—was considered a reference to Bowie beginning another new phase of his life.

== Impact on music sales ==
Following Bowie's death, sales of his albums and singles soared. Blackstar, already on track to claim the number one spot in the United Kingdom, accelerated in sales and stayed atop the albums chart for three weeks, as well as topping the Billboard 200 chart in the United States. Blackstar topped the album charts in 24 countries, including France, Germany and Italy, while it made the top 5 in a further six countries, including Japan and South Korea.

In the United States, Bowie's combined album and song sales rose to 682,000 following his death, which was a rise of more than 5,000%. Another nine of his albums re-entered in the Billboard 200, including Hunky Dory (1971), The Rise and Fall of Ziggy Stardust and the Spiders from Mars (1972), Aladdin Sane (1973), Low (1977), Let's Dance (1983), and The Next Day (2013). On the Billboard Hot Rock Songs chart, Bowie broke the record for most entries by a single artist, with 21 songs.

Blackstar was replaced at number one in the UK by his 2002 compilation Best of Bowie, making Bowie the first artist to replace themselves atop the album chart since Michael Jackson did so following his death in 2009. In the week following his death, Bowie had 19 albums and 13 singles in the top 100 charts for both categories, with his 1977 single ""Heroes"" reaching a new peak of number 12. Bowie would later equal Elvis Presley's record for most albums in the top 40 at one time, with twelve.

In France, David Bowie had three singles enter the top 10, including "Space Oddity" which peaked at number one and gave Bowie his first chart-topping single in the country. The Bowie compilation album Nothing Has Changed gained new peaks worldwide in countries where it had never made the top 10, rising to number one in New Zealand (where it spent four weeks), number three in Australia, number four in Austria and Germany, number five in Switzerland, number six in Netherlands, number seven in Hungary, and number nine in Italy. Global streams of Bowie's music on streaming service Spotify spiked by 2,822% after his death, while the singer occupied all ten of the top ten music videos on the iTunes video chart.

Bowie was the biggest-selling vinyl artist of 2016 in the UK, with five albums in the vinyl Top 30, including Blackstar as the number one selling vinyl album of the year. BPI, who oversees the charts, noted that Bowie's album likely "would have sold in large volumes" even had Bowie not died.

Internationally, Spotify reported a 2,000 percent increase in song streams.

== Tributes and services ==
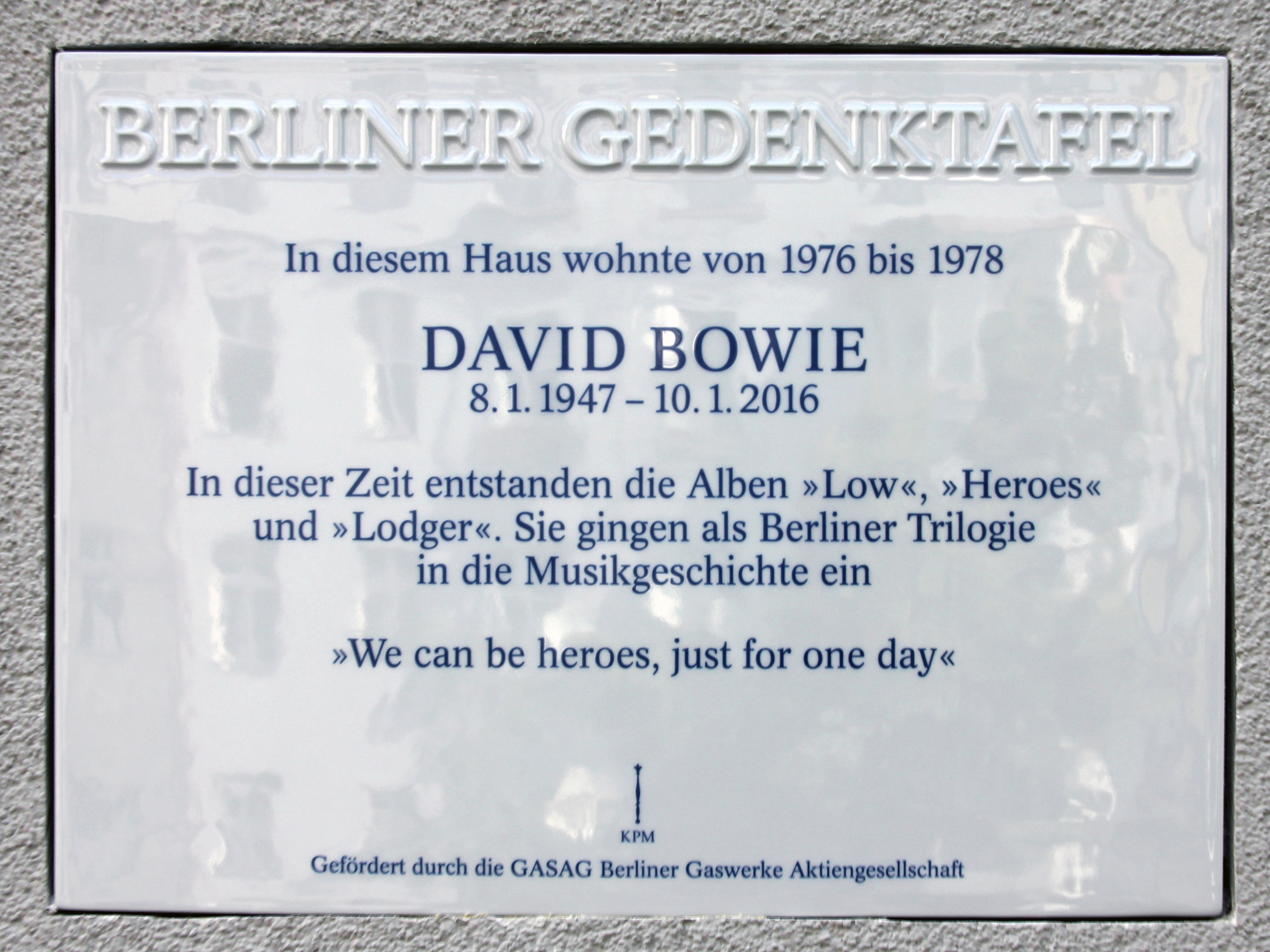
Berlin memorial plaque, Hauptstraße 155, in Schöneberg, Germany

Several artists performed songs by Bowie during concerts in the weeks following his death, including Elton John, Madonna, Bruce Springsteen and Red Hot Chili Peppers. Numerous cities across the world also held events to remember Bowie. A concert at Carnegie Hall in New York City called The Music of David Bowie had already been announced, and was turned into a memorial event after news of his death broke; tickets sold out in two hours. A number of artists performed and paid tribute at a memorial event in London's Union Chapel six days after his death. Lady Gaga was chosen to perform a tribute to Bowie at the 58th Annual Grammy Awards, which featured a medley of his songs such as "Space Oddity", "Changes", "Ziggy Stardust", "Fame", and "Let's Dance". In New Orleans, a large second line parade was led by the band Arcade Fire in the French Quarter. The event was held in February with fans packing the streets dressed in their Bowie-inspired attire. The rock band Phish performed Bowie's The Rise and Fall of Ziggy Stardust and the Spiders from Mars album in its entirety as their Halloween costume at the MGM Grand Garden Arena on 31 October 2016. Bowie was presented the Brits Icon award in February 2016, a few weeks after his death. Singer Annie Lennox paid tribute to Bowie at the presentation, singer Lorde performed "Life on Mars?" with his old touring band, and actor and friend Gary Oldman accepted the award on Bowie's behalf.

The video game Omikron: The Nomad Soul, in which Bowie voiced characters, composed the soundtrack, and contributed to the story writing, was offered as a free download for a week following Bowie's death.

Bowie portrayed FBI Agent Phillip Jeffries in David Lynch's Twin Peaks prequel film Twin Peaks: Fire Walk with Me. He was asked about reprising the role with a cameo appearance in the 2017 revival series, but had to turn down the offer. Bowie's lawyer informed Lynch he was unavailable without specifying why, but Bowie gave the production permission before his passing to reuse old footage of his under the condition he would be dubbed over by an authentic Louisiana actor due to being unhappy with the accent he used in Fire Walk with Me, resulting Nathan Frizzell's casting as Jeffries' voice. "Part 14" of the revival series was dedicated to Bowie's memory.

Bowie was included in the "In Memoriam" tribute at the 88th Academy Awards in a performance by Dave Grohl.

Prior to Bowie's death, Marvel Studios president Kevin Feige had brought up to director James Gunn about having Bowie make a cameo appearance in the Marvel Cinematic Universe (MCU) film Guardians of the Galaxy Vol. 2, having already featured "Moonage Daydream" in Guardians of the Galaxy. Gunn was enthusiastic with the idea, and despite knowing from common friends he wasn't doing well, Bowie told them he was going to recover and was interested on Gunn's idea to appear as a member of Yondu Udonta's original Ravager crew. The finished film, released in 2017, included "Suffragette City" in one of its TV spots.

Lin-Manuel Miranda was writing songs for the Disney film Moana after Bowie died, and said "The world had already been mourning Bowie, I'd been listening to Bowie on a loop" and as a result wrote the song "Shiny" partially as a tribute to him.

On American Idol's 15th-season finale, the winners sang some of Bowie's most famous songs on stage.

Blade Runner 2049 director Denis Villeneuve originally had Bowie in mind for the role of Niander Wallace, owing to Bowie being one of the influences of the original Blade Runner film. Upon Bowie's death, Villeneuve looked for another actor with a similar rockstar vibe, resulting in Jared Leto's casting after he wrapped filming on the DC Extended Universe (DCEU) film Suicide Squad.

Glenn Branca, whom Bowie had met and had referred to as an influence on his Tin Machine music, released The Light (for David) in 2016. Branca called Bowie "a kind of muse" and wrote the piece as a tribute to him.

For a short time, the street sign for Bowie Street in Austin, Texas (named for Alamo hero James Bowie), was amended to read David Bowie Street.

The BBC commissioned a documentary of Bowie's last few years, titled David Bowie: The Last Five Years. It was broadcast on BBC Two, approximately one year after Bowie's death, on 7 January 2017, the day before what would have been his 70th birthday.

Nine Inch Nails frontman Trent Reznor, who toured with Bowie on The Outside Tour during its North American leg, and appeared later in the music video for "I'm Afraid of Americans", produced "I Can't Give Everything Away (Farewell Mix)" a remix of the final song from Blackstar, and performed it live on 20 July 2017.

The 2023 revival season of the Fresh TV animated series Total Drama featured a gay contestant named Bowie, who was renamed from his original considered name due to head writer Terry McGurrin's suggestion given his admiration for Bowie due to his status as a fluid, androgynous rock icon who normalized bisexuality, make-up and women's clothing without caring for anyone else's opinion.

Due to the 2024 announcement of Robert Eggers directing a sequel to Labyrinth because of the success of his Nosferatu remake, it was noted by Feature First that Eggers would have to recast Jareth the Goblin King if he were to bring back Bowie's character, insider Jeff Sneider noting that Alexander Skarsgård had been previously spoken years ago to take over Bowie's role as Jareth.

=== Estate ===
Bowie left an estate of around $100 million to his wife, Iman, and his two children. He left $2 million to his long-standing assistant, Corinne Schwab, and $1 million to his friend Marion Skene, the nanny to his eldest child, Duncan. To his daughter Alexandria, he left a 25% share in the estate and a property on Little Tonshi Mountain in New York. His son Duncan also received 25%. His other properties and the remaining 50% of the estate went to Iman.
