= Sideman =

Role for a musician

A sideman is a professional musician who is hired to perform live with a solo artist, or with a group in which they are not a regular band member. The term is usually used to describe musicians that play with jazz or rock artists, whether solo or a group.

Sidemen and sidewomen are often well-versed in multiple styles of music, and can be hired at any level of the music industry, from playing in a cover band to backing up established artists on major tours.

While many artists can work as sidemen or session musicians, others will only fill one role. The generally accepted difference is that a sideman performs live while a session musician is hired to perform in a recording studio.

== Career progression ==
Aspiring musicians often start out as sidemen, playing rhythm guitar, comping on keyboards, playing drums in the rhythm section, or singing backing vocals for a well-known bandleader or singer. Once sidemen have become experienced with live performance and recording with established artists, some move on to develop their own sound, a recognized name, and fans of their own, or go on to form their own groups, at which point they become bandleaders and recruit their own sidemen and sidewomen. Some examples of this are:

- James Burton and Glen Hardin, playing guitar and keyboards respectively, who performed in Elvis Presley's TCB Band, also backed Gram Parsons before joining newcomer Rodney Crowell and veteran Albert Lee in Emmylou Harris' "Hot Band".
- Don Henley and Glenn Frey were in the initial backup band for Linda Ronstadt, which toured in support of her eponymous debut album. Afterwards, with the addition of Bernie Leadon and Randy Meisner, they formed the Eagles.

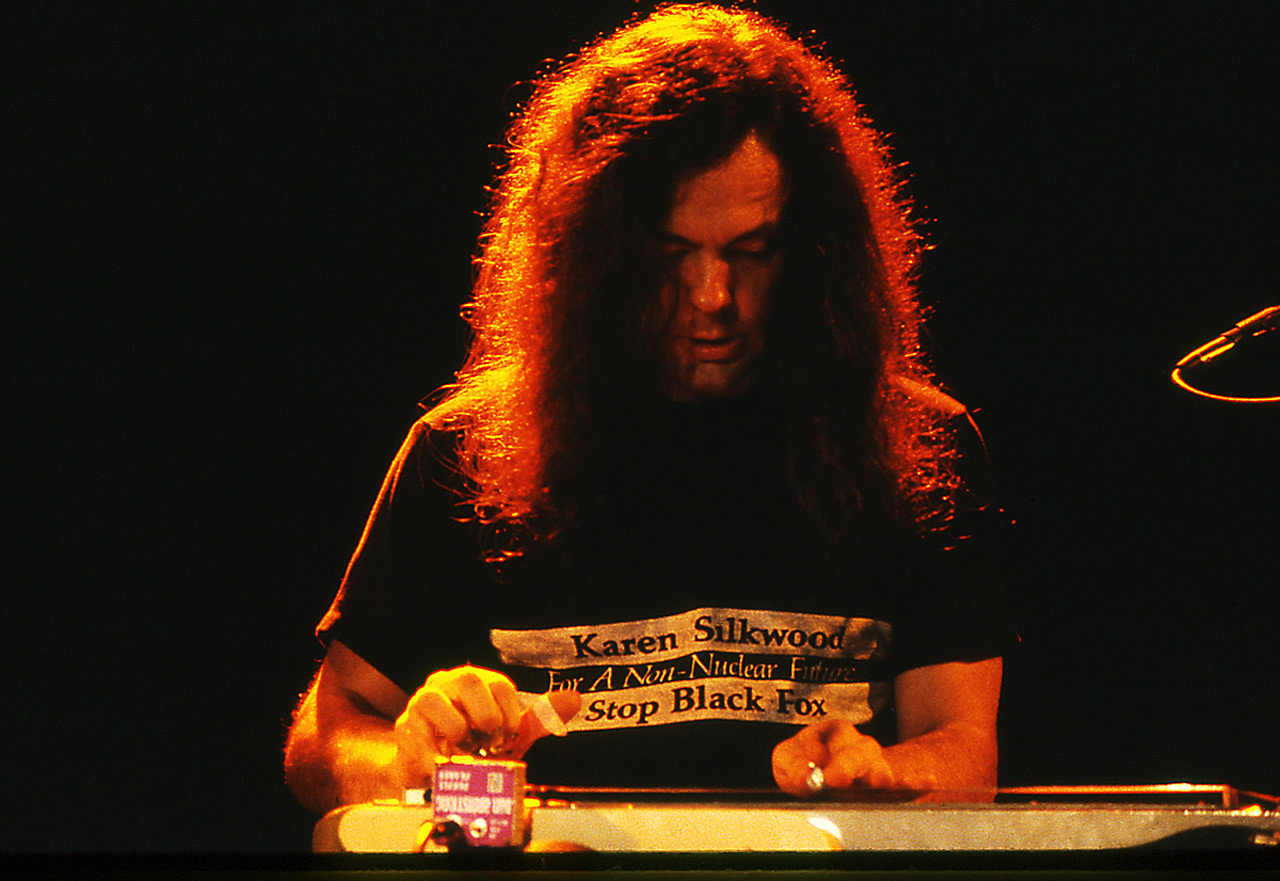
David Lindley (1980) playing lap steel guitar

Some sidemen become famous for their musical specialties, and become highly sought after by pop, rock, blues, jazz and country music bands. Examples of some of these include multi-instrumentalists. David Lindley is a multi-instrumentalist who has worked with such diverse musicians as Curtis Mayfield, Dolly Parton, Jackson Browne, and Hani Naser.

Waddy Wachtel's guitar licks and experience have placed him as a bandleader while on tour with Stevie Nicks, and Chuck Leavell, who has toured with The Allman Brothers Band, but more often, is onstage with The Rolling Stones on keyboards.

Often sidemen go on to form their own groups and/or solo careers; for instance, John Lennon, Paul McCartney, George Harrison, and Pete Best acted as sidemen to Tony Sheridan before becoming famous as The Beatles, with the addition of Ringo Starr. Jimmy Page left his first attempts working in bands to hone his skills as a session player, where he met John Paul Jones; he later recruited Robert Plant and John Bonham to form Led Zeppelin. Bob Dylan's first recorded song was as a harmonica sideman on Harry Belafonte's cover of "Midnight Special".

Other musicians may take time from their own bands to tour or record as a sideman for other artists, such as punk bassist Mike Watt with J Mascis and the Fog or Iggy and the Stooges.

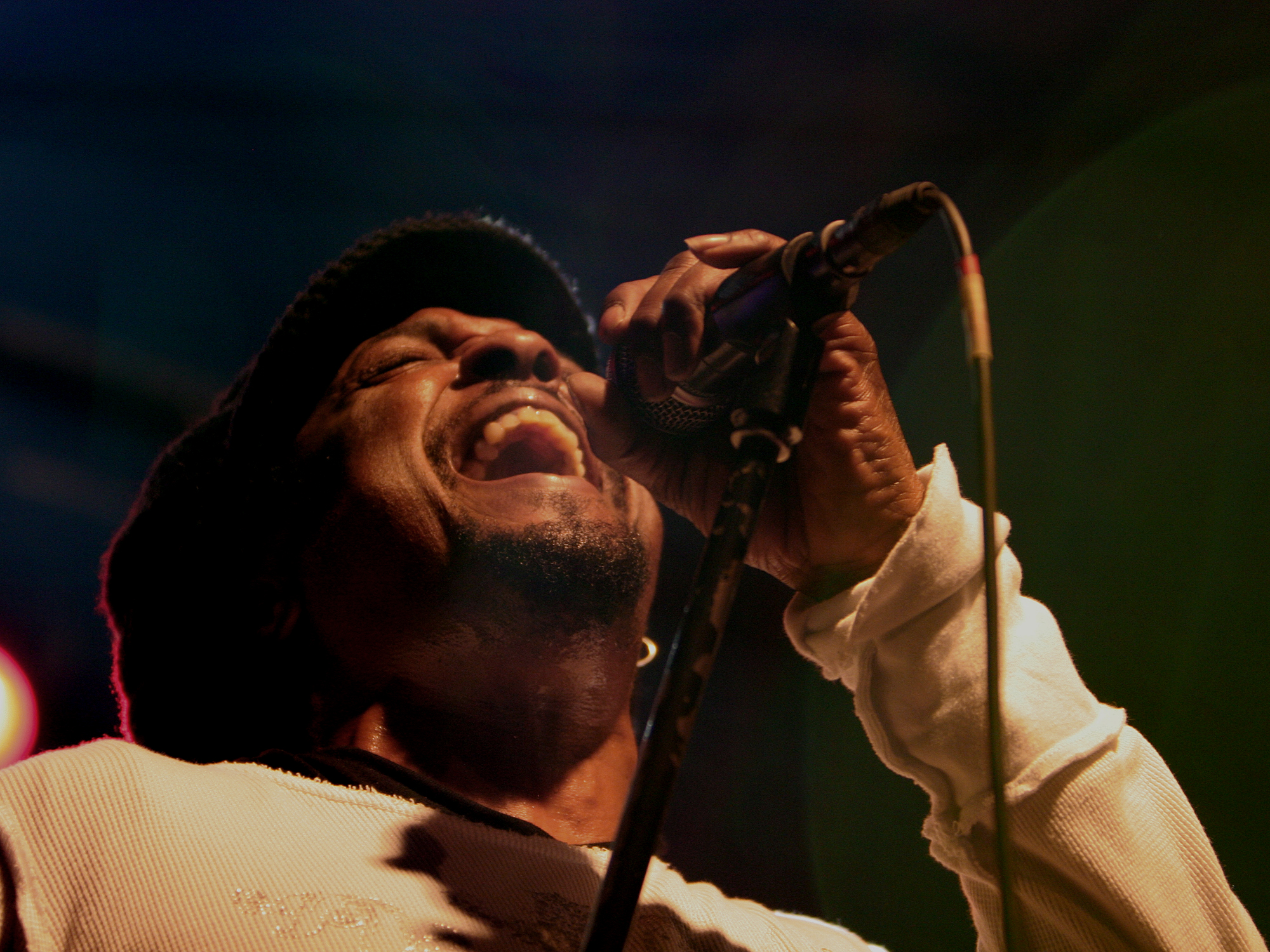
Bernard Fowler, backup vocalist for The Rolling Stones

== See also ==
- Session musician
- Rock 'n' Roll Guns for Hire: The Story of the Sidemen
