= Hillary Clinton: The Power of Women =

- Directed by: Francis Whately
- Produced by: Francis Whately
- Starring: Hillary Clinton; Condoleezza Rice; Madeleine Albright
- Cinematography: Philippe Cooke
- Music by: Nicholas Baxter
- Distributed by: BBC Two
- Release date: 25 March 2015
- Running time: 60 minutes
- Country: United Kingdom
- Language: English

Hillary Clinton: The Power of Women is a 2015 British documentary produced and directed by Francis Whately. Hillary Clinton, Condoleezza Rice, and Madeleine Albright are interviewed about women's rights in the world, and how they have changed since 1995. The film premiered on 25 March 2015 on BBC Two. The documentary was filmed and broadcast before Clinton announced her intentions to run for president in 2016.

== Synopsis ==
The film looks at whether any progress has been made with treating women's rights as human rights, since twenty years ago, when in 1995, Hillary Clinton made a groundbreaking speech at the Fourth Women's Conference in Beijing. It features interviews with the only three women to have held the position of Secretary of State, as of 2015. It also focuses on examples of female empowerment, by speaking to Leymah Gbowee, who was the driving force behind the women's peace movement in Liberia that helped to end a civil war; Indian social activist Sunitha Krishnan, who rescues victims of sex trafficking; Afghan politician and women's rights activist Fawzia Koofi; and Egyptian-American Mona Eltahawy, a journalist and social commentator.

== Cast ==
- Hillary Clinton
- Condoleezza Rice
- Madeleine Albright
- Christine Lagarde
- Tina Brown
- Leymah Gbowee
- Sunitha Krishnan
- Fawzia Koofi
- Mona Eltahawy

== Background ==
First Lady Hillary Rodham Clinton's Remarks to the Fourth Women's Conference in Beijing, China

In a September 1995 speech before the Fourth World Conference on Women in Beijing, Clinton argued forcefully against practices that abused women around the world and in the People's Republic of China itself. She declared, "it is no longer acceptable to discuss women's rights as separate from human rights". Delegates from over 180 countries heard her say: "If there is one message that echoes forth from this conference, let it be that human rights are women's rights and women's rights are human rights, once and for all." In doing so, she resisted both internal administration and Chinese pressure to soften her remarks. The speech became a key moment in the empowerment of women and years later women around the world would recite Clinton's key phrases.

== Release ==
The documentary was filmed and broadcast before Clinton announced her intentions to run for president in 2016. Clinton announced her candidacy on 12 April 2015. The film premiered on 25 March 2015 on BBC Two.

== Reception ==
External videos
- Hillary Clinton: The Power of Women
- via BBC News
- Clip from The Power of Women

Martin Doyle from the Financial Times wrote that the film "recalls the 1995 war cry uttered in Beijing by the then First Lady about women's rights; Rice, Albright and women from Asia and Africa judge whether progress has been made". Vicki Power also mentions that the film "reminds us of her ground-breaking Beijing speech of 20 years ago in which she exhorted the world's leaders to treat women's rights as human rights". She wrote in The Daily Telegraph that "the film is an admirable consciousness-raising exercise pointing out that violations against women in the 21st century remain appalling, and challenging us to do something about it".

British journalist Andrew Billen wrote the film is a "solemn, occasionally inspiring, documentary on the outrageous status of women around the world .. twenty years on from the landmark Beijing conference on women at which Clinton powerfully spoke, the UN records pitiful progress". He also criticised Clinton for when she was secretary of state for "cosying up to repressive, misogynist regimes in the Middle East". Overall, he said "the programme belonged to Leymah Gbowee, who brought down Charles Taylor, the warlord president who recruited child soldiers".

Will Dean of The Independent notes that the film "took us through a brief – mainly depressing – ride through some of the worst things to happen to the planet's women over the past 20 years, but there were some hopeful – albeit – well-known tales. Leymah Gbowee, Fawzia Koofi, and brave Arab activists such as Mona Eltahawy; this was their story more than it was Clinton's. And though it made sense to append her name to title, it was misleading". Lisa-Marie Ferlawith of The Arts Desk was lukewarm in her review, writing that with "such a wide range of issues to cover, such a short time to do it in and with understandable focus on the thoughts of its three lead interviewees, the documentary tackled neither of its main questions cohesively". She also opined that "Clinton has now adopted Albright’s motto that "there is a special place in hell reserved for women who don't help other women".

Like the other commentators, Sam Wollaston of The Guardian highlights "Clinton's ground-breaking kick-ass speech she made in Beijing in 1995, and what has changed for women and girls in the world during the last 20 years". He notes that some "progress has been made; there are roughly twice as many female world leaders as there were 20 years ago; but there’s a hell of a lot more to be done". He also credited Albright for accurately noting that "it’s one thing to be in the diplomatic and pleasant atmosphere of the United Nations, it’s another to be on the ground".

== See also ==
- Women's rights are human rights
