= Rock 'n' Roll Guns for Hire: The Story of the Sidemen =

2017 British documentary

- Directed by: Francis Whately
- Produced by: Sarah Kerr; Francis Whately
- Cinematography: Louis Caulfield; Richard Numeroff; Kev Robertson
- Edited by: Ged Murphy
- Production companies: BBC Studios; BBC Music
- Distributed by: BBC4 (UK)
- Release date: 7 July 2017 (UK)
- Running time: 90 minutes
- Country: United Kingdom
- Language: English

Rock 'n' Roll Guns for Hire: The Story of the Sidemen is a 2017 British documentary directed by Francis Whately, and produced by Sarah Kerr and Whately. The film stars various sidemen such as; Earl Slick, Bernard Fowler, Catherine Russell and Wendy & Lisa. Members of the Rolling Stones and Billy Joel make appearances as well. The film premiered in the United Kingdom on BBC4, in July 2017.

== Synopsis ==
Guitarist Earl Slick, David Bowie's sideman of 40 years, and who has also worked with John Lennon, The Cure and the New York Dolls, narrates this documentary that explores what it is like to be the men and women behind some of the most notable songs of the 20th and 21st century. Among those offering their opinions are Mick Jagger, Keith Richards and Billy Joel. There are also numerous interviews with those who have worked with Beyonce, Prince and Bruce Springsteen, among others.

== Cast ==
- Earl Slick
- Bernard Fowler
- Mick Jagger
- Ronnie Wood
- Keith Richards
- Charlie Watts
- Bill Laswell
- Lisa Fischer
- Mike Garson
- Mark Plati
- Lisa Coleman
- Wendy Melvoin
- Alan Light
- Catherine Russell
- Steve Cropper
- David Porter
- Eddie Floyd
- Billy Joel
- Crystal Taliefero
- Allan Arkush
- Christian Benner
- Crystal "Rovél" Torres
- Chris Sholar
- Lupe Fiasco

== Background ==
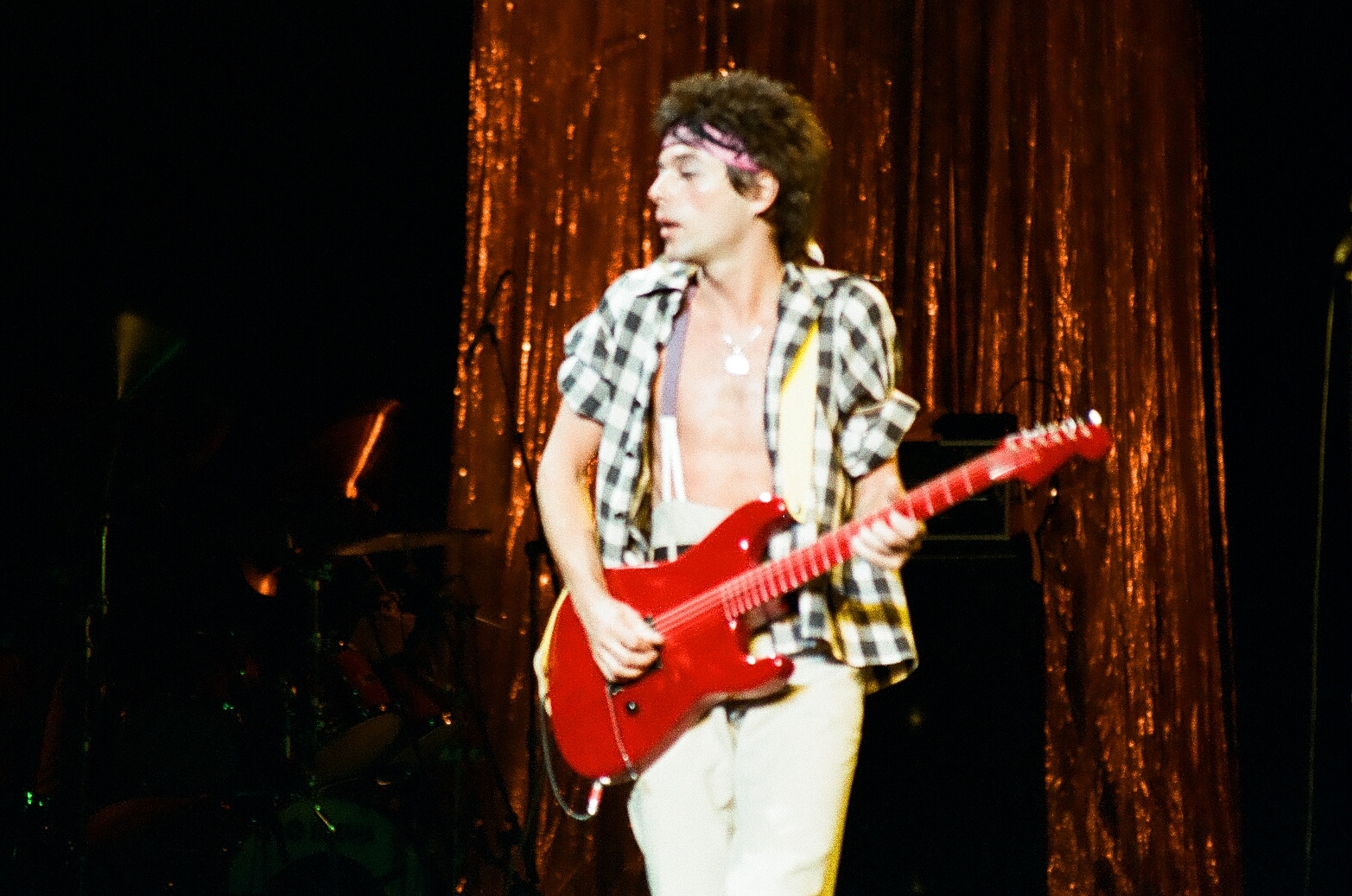
Slick in 1983 during David Bowie's Serious Moonlight Tour

Guitarist Earl Slick said he originally wanted to write a book about the subject material, but after talking to director Francis Whately, who suggested it would make a good documentary, they decided to focus instead on a film. Slick says one of the aims of the film is to show you the reality of what it is like to actually be a sideman, so through interviews and commentary from some of those people who have worked with the biggest names in the music industry, they set out to "dispel the myth of what a sideman is". Besides working with David Bowie for much of his career, Slick also played on John Lennon's Double Fantasy album and Yoko Ono's Season of Glass.

Slick said he first met David Bowie in 1974, when he got a call from Bowie, asking him to audition. Slicks recalls that he wasn't familiar with his work, and when he met him, he sees this "skinny spooky-ass looking guy with bright red hair and no eyebrows". He further elaborates that they talked and he played, and the next day he got a call asking him if he wanted the gig, and "that's where it all started". Fast forward to 2012, and Slick says when he was working with him on the track "Valentine's Day", for his album The Next Day, Bowie played his "basic idea" for the single, Slick "heard Ray Davies 'Waterloo Sunset' all over it", so he begin to perform it like that, and "eventually it morphed into what it is". Slick also recalls that when he worked on the last couple of tours with Bowie, he would be "front and center" a lot of the time. He say there was an "unspoken" connection between the two of them when the time came for him to "take over the front man situation, and when he would give it back".

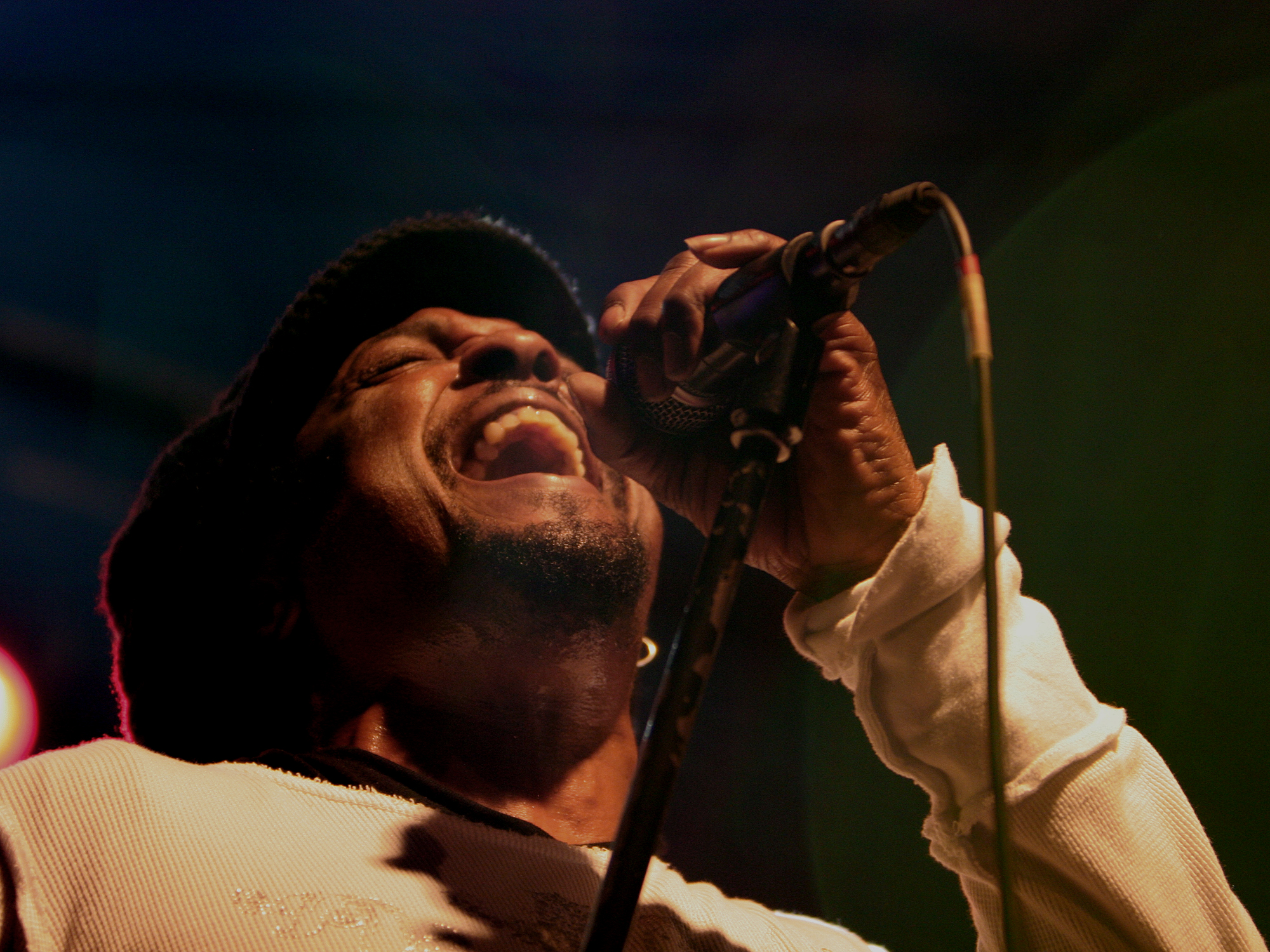
The Rolling Stones Bernard Fowler

Another sideman interviewed for the film was Bernard Fowler, who has worked with the Rolling Stones for 30 years. He says in the film, that when he hits the stage, "it's where perspective is most needed ... I can make myself invisible most of the time, and I prefer to be". He tells an amusing anecdote where he recalls walking into some club, "and some guy says, that's Bernard Fowler, he's a backup singer for the Rolling Stones, and another guy says back, bullshit, ain't no black people in the Rolling Stones". Ronnie Wood says Fowler "brings a reliability to Mick", while Charlie Watts says he is one of the "best undiscovered voices in America".

Other notable sidemen featured in the film are Lisa Fischer, who was in 20 Feet from Stardom, and Otis Redding's guitarist, Steve Cropper, who plays "Dock of the Bay", which he co-wrote, and Wendy & Lisa, from their time playing with Prince's backing band The Revolution, and their recollections from working on Purple Rain.

== Release ==
The documentary premiered on BBC4 on 7 July 2017, and then made its way to the United States in August 2018, where it was shown on PBS stations.

== Reception ==
External videos
- via PBS
- Trailer for Rock 'n' Roll Guns for Hire

Financial Times Suzi Feay's takeaway from the film was that in order "to be a good sideman you need personality yes, ego no ... your job is to be versatile and to be a like a fireman ... you’re the dude on tour ... and you never forget whose name is on the billboards". She also points out that a "sidey's life can be precarious; Wendy and Lisa were unceremoniously dumped". John Dugdale wrote in The Times, that the film is a "likeable guide to a musical tribe".

American journalist Tim Dowling wrote that Slick had an "unusual leading role" in the film ... "exploring what it takes – and what it means – to have a career based on facilitating someone else's vision". He also pointed out that the Rolling Stones "heap measured praise on Bernard Fowler .. the Stones seem utterly reliant on him". He concluded from watching the film in his final remarks that "at 90 minutes, this was too long by half an hour – we spent a lot of time learning what they were up to these days – but it was still a frank and fascinating glimpse into an overlooked profession".

== See also ==
- Offstage musicians and singers in popular music
- Session musician

== Sources ==
- Richard Numeroff (cinematographer) (27 July 2017). Rock 'n' Roll Guns for Hire (video). Francis Whately (director); Various colleagues and musicians. BBC4 – via Vimeo.
