= David Bowie: The Last Five Years =

2017 British documentary

- Directed by: Francis Whately
- Produced by: Phil Dolling; Francis Whately
- Cinematography: Louis Caulfield; Richard Numeroff
- Edited by: Ged Murphy
- Production companies: BBC Studios; BBC Music
- Distributed by: BBC (UK); HBO (US)
- Release date: January 7, 2017
- Running time: 93 minutes
- Country: United Kingdom
- Language: English

David Bowie: The Last Five Years is a 2017 British documentary that tells the story of the last five years of David Bowie's career. It was produced and directed by Francis Whately. The film uses unseen footage of Bowie, and commentary from a wide variety of friends and colleagues. It was first broadcast on BBC on 7 January 2017, and was then released on HBO on 8 January 2018. The film received generally positive reviews. In 2019 it was followed by David Bowie: Finding Fame.

== Synopsis ==
The film traces the final five years of David Bowie's career as he came back from a long hiatus to create two new albums, The Next Day in 2013 and Blackstar in 2016, and the off-Broadway musical, Lazarus. The film's story begins in 2004, when Bowie suffered symptoms of a heart attack onstage in Germany, which ended his final world tour. Whately used footage from his first documentary; David Bowie: Five Years, which explored five of Bowie's most iconic albums, from Ziggy Stardust to Let's Dance, and also used behind-the-scenes footage from Bowie's videos for the film. The footage is interspersed with analysis and commentary from friends, colleagues, band members, designers, video directors and the Lazarus creative team. The films title is a nod to the Ziggy Stardust track "Five Years" (halfway through the documentary, the song appears in a 1976 performance from The Dinah Shore Show). Bowie died two days after Blackstar was released in 2016.

== Cast ==
Cast in order of appearance

- David Bowie
- Earl Slick
- Gail Ann Dorsey
- Gerry Leonard
- Catherine Russell
- Sterling Campbell
- Tony Visconti
- Zachary Alford
- David Torn
- Geoff MacCormack
- Mike Garson
- Ava Cherry
- Carlos Alomar
- Reeves Gabrels
- Floria Sigismondi
- Tony Oursler

- Indrani
- Jonathan Barnbrook
- Maria Schneider
- Donny McCaslin
- Mark Guiliana
- Ben Monder
- Robert Fox
- Michael C. Hall
- Ivo van Hove
- Enda Walsh
- Henry Hey
- Toni Basil
- Tim Lefebvre
- Jason Lindner
- Johan Renck
- Mark Plati

== Background ==
Always go a little further into the water than you feel you're capable of being, go a little bit out of your depth, and when you don't feel that your feet are quite touching the bottom, you're just about in the right place to do something exciting.

— David Bowie

In November 2016, the BBC announced that the documentary would be screened on the first anniversary of his death. Director Francis Whately said that when he was asked to make the film, the BBC informed him it would have to be completed in a year’s time, in order for it to air on Bowie's 70th birthday. Whately recalls that he wasn't sure he had it in him, "much as I am a fan, I didn’t know whether we could do anything that would be substantially different to the first film". Whately said he finally decided on using some of Bowie's work that he had produced near the end of his life. He acknowledged that it was going to be a challenge, because at that time in Bowie's life, it was basically undocumented, as Bowie hadn't given any recent media interviews, and there was very little archival footage available to work with. Whately said he experienced sleepless nights thinking, "how am I going to fill 90 minutes without any footage ... I was really worried."

In order to compensate for the lack of documentation, Whately came up with a unique solution. He planned on reuniting the musicians who Bowie had worked with on his last two albums, to recreate what it was like working with Bowie in the studio sessions, and secondly, he shot a performance of Lazarus at the New York Theatre Workshop. He filmed the musicians from the Blackstar album at a New York jazz club called 55 Bar, which happened to be the same place Bowie had first seen them perform, and then eventually asked to play on the album. In addition to the recollections of the musicians and the performance, his archive producer was able to find never-before-seen material, which included Bowie becoming irritated while being filmed talking with artist Damien Hirst at an exhibit in New York City. Whately thought the clip was a very compelling moment "for a man who was desperate for fame, and then had a very ambivalent relationship with fame". His producer also dug up some unseen silent black-and-white footage of Bowie singing "Lady Stardust", and his editor was able to score a bootleg recording of the song, and synced the audio with the visual.

Whately relied on Bowie's long time producer Tony Visconti as well. He had been with the singer from the early days in 1969, clear up to Blackstar. Visconti was able to provide Whately with unheard demos from Bowie's last sessions. Andy Greene from Rolling Stone said that "the most chilling moment comes when Visconti plays the isolated vocals from Lazarus, which allow you to hear each agonized breath Bowie took between lines". Video director Johan Renck is filmed discussing the significance of the skeletal astronaut character Bowie commissioned for Blackstar. Whately ponders whether that character is Major Tom, he admits he has "no way of knowing that, but he certainly wanted you to believe that it was ... it's the character that made him successful, so the idea of one of his last videos having Major Tom absolutely made sense". Whately started production on the documentary in September 2016, and had it finished in four months.

== Release ==
The documentary was released approximately one year after Bowie's death on 7 January 2017, on BBC Two In February 2017, HBO announced they had acquired the rights to the film, and it had its premiere on HBO on 8 January 2018.

== Reception ==
On the review aggregator website Rotten Tomatoes, 88% of 17 critics' reviews are positive. On Metacritic it has a weighted average score 81% based on 6 critic, indicating "generally favorable" reviews.

Andy Greene from Rolling Stone said that Whately "frequently uses concepts and references in Bowie's final songs to flash back to prior moments in his career when they were explored; he traces the theme of celebrity from "The Stars (Are Out Tonight)", back to Bowie's lifelong struggle with fame". He also noted there is also a "lengthy prologue centering on Bowie's A Reality Tour ... tour footage from that time shows Bowie goofing off with his band and checking out a Montana truck stop, at one point competing with guitarist Earl Slick to win stuffed animals in a claw-machine game". Greene is amused when Bowie is seen looking "through cassettes on a discount rack and finds the 1989 release by his side project, Tin Machine, and 1979's Lodger .... "these must be albums that nobody ever bought so they got moved here", Bowie quips.

Zach Schonfeld wrote in Newsweek Global about a coincidence in the film he thought was "spooky". He relays how the video director for Lazarus, had "Bowie lying on a deathbed ... it was not intended to represent Bowie's illness ... and only later did the director learn that Bowie had discovered his cancer was terminal the very week he filmed the video". Schonfeld also mentions that "those expecting intimate details of his battle with cancer will be disappointed, as Whately chose not to involve Bowie's family, and the film makes no real attempt to breach the wall erected between his public and private lives". Richard Bienstock from Billboard Magazine said that while Whately's first film "covered the golden period, when most people were huge Bowie fans, this one is more about the man". Bienstock opined that "Whately has crafted a fascinating and at turns haunting portrait of Bowie that shows just how fertile his last five years were".

In his review for the Los Angeles Times, Robert Lloyd points out that "if you are unfamiliar with the final, fertile phase of Bowie's career ... this is a fine introduction ... if you know the period, there are many odd delights: goofy tour-stop footage, behind-the-scenes glimpses of videos in production, a good taste of Lazarus in rehearsal on stage, tales of genial collaboration, and lots of music". He also noted how the "focus is almost entirely on the work, and that if little of the information here will be new to fans, it's still a treat to see the musicians performing live to Bowie's vocal tracks — as close to a concert as history will allow".

Scout Tafoya from RogerEbert.com wasn't impressed with the film, he claims the film "was ostensibly made to shed light on the creation of his final two albums, and the musical Lazarus, but Whately either didn't have enough material or wasn't interested in making those projects the sole focus of the film, so he also spends a lot of time looking back on Bowie's life and career, his songs, his characters, and his final tour". He further complained that "this is plainly too much information for one film to handle ... the many threads ought to tell you how frustrating an experience the film is, leapfrogging from one formal choice or line of inquiry and never deciding what story it's telling ... Bowie contained multitudes, and the best the movie can do is hint at a handful of them in frequently silly ways". Jordan Frieman from Spin Magazine likewise wasn't pleased with the film, he says "it feels unfocused and confused ... the timeline becomes muddled, as songs and visuals that wouldn’t be released until 2013 are given heavy focus in the 2011 and 2012 sections ... sections in which Bowie's bands simply get together to play the tracks they recorded years earlier, or producer Tony Visconti sits at his computer going over his work, would be fine in an episode of Classic Albums ... but they don't fit the tone of a documentary that promises at its outset to reveal the real David Bowie".

== Accolades ==
Year	Award	Category	Result	Ref.
2017	Prix Italia	Performing Arts	Won	
2018	British Academy Television Craft Awards	Editing: Factual	Nominated	
2018	British Academy Television Craft Awards	Sound: Factual	Nominated	
2018	Critics' Choice Documentary Awards	Best Music Documentary	Nominated	

== See also ==
- David Bowie discography
- David Bowie filmography
- List of songs recorded by David Bowie
