= Frank Ray =

- Born: Francisco Gomez; January 8, 1987 (age 39); Deming, New Mexico, U.S.
- Origin: Nashville, Tennessee, U.S.
- Genre: Country
- Occupation: Singer
- Instruments: Vocals; guitar
- Years active: 2019–present
- Label: BBR

Francisco Gomez (born January 8, 1987), known professionally as Frank Ray, is an American country music singer. Signed to BBR Music Group, he has released the single "Country'd Look Good on You".

== Biography ==
Francisco Gomez is a native of Deming, New Mexico. His parents divorced when he was four years old, and he lived with his mother in Laredo and San Antonio, Texas. He then moved to Columbus, New Mexico with his father. It was through his moving that he began listening to not only country music, but also ranchera music. As he is of Hispanic descent, he thought that he would "stand out" as a country musician, citing other Hispanic artists such as Freddy Fender as inspiration on this front.

From 2007 to 2017, Gomez worked as a police officer in Las Cruces, New Mexico. After having success with performances on weekends and gaining regional commercial success with songs on the Texas country charts, he retired from the police force and began singing full-time. He released an EP titled Different Kind of Country in 2018 under his performing name of Frank Ray. In addition, he became an opening act for Ashley McBryde.

In 2021, Ray signed with BBR Music Group and released the song "Streetlights". The song features Ray singing in both English and Spanish. Ray was contacted by BBR staff after one of them discovered a previous song of his, "Tequila Mockingbird", on a Spotify playlist. Later in the year he issued his debut single, "Country'd Look Good on You". This was followed in January 2022 by his first performance on the Grand Ole Opry. The same month, "Country'd Look Good on You" entered the top 40 on the Billboard Country Airplay charts, and went on to peak in the top 20 of the chart in September.

== Discography ==
=== Singles ===
List of singles, with selected chart positions
Year	Title	Peak positions	
Year	Title	US Country Songs	US Country Airplay
2021	"Country'd Look Good on You"	46	17
2023	"Somebody Else's Whiskey"	—	48
2024	"Uh-Huh (Ajá)"	—	—
2025	"Miami in Tennessee"	—	—
