= David Bowie: Five Years =

2013 British documentary

- Directed by: Francis Whately
- Written by: Francis Whately
- Produced by: Phil Dolling; Francis Whately
- Cinematography: Richard Numeroff
- Edited by: Ged Murphy
- Production company: BBC Studios
- Distributed by: BBC Two
- Release date: 25 May 2013 (UK)
- Running time: 90 minutes
- Country: United Kingdom
- Language: English

David Bowie: Five Years is a 2013 British documentary produced and directed by Francis Whately. The film explores five years in David Bowie's career which saw him redefine himself as an artist in 1971, 1975, 1977, 1980 and 1983. The documentary made its premiere on BBC Two in May 2013. The film received mixed reviews.

== Synopsis ==
The film shows five key years in David Bowie's career, featuring interviews with collaborators, band members, journalists and commentary from music critics It also features an abundance of previously unseen archive material of Bowie, which the director of the film uses to narrate the film. It is evident from the five years highlighted in the documentary; Bowie continually evolves, from Ziggy Stardust to the Soul Star of Young Americans, to the Thin White Duke.

== Cast ==
Cast in order of appearance

- David Bowie
- Rick Wakeman
- John Harris
- Ken Scott
- Mick Ronson
- Charles Shaar Murray
- Trevor Bolder
- Angie Bowie
- Camille Paglia
- Ava Cherry
- Carlos Alomar
- Luther Vandross
- Nelson George
- Robin Clark
- Geoff MacCormack
- Russell Harty
- Earl Slick
- Dennis Davis
- Brian Eno
- Tony Visconti
- Robert Fripp
- David Mallett
- Nile Rodgers
- Carmine Rojas

== Background ==
External images
- David Bowie exhibition
- via the V&A
- The inspiration behind Bowie's Ziggy Stardust hairstyle
- Inside one of the exhibition's rooms

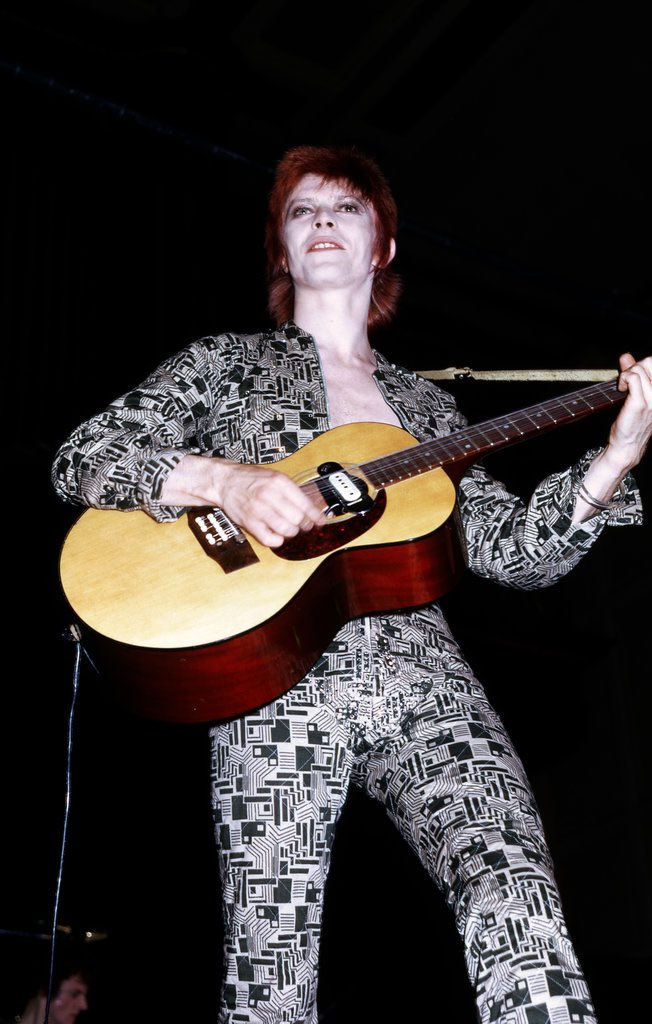
Bowie during the Ziggy Stardust Tour, 1972

Director Francis Whately said the documentary came about when the V&A approached him and told him they were doing a David Bowie exhibition, which became the museum's fastest-selling display of all time. Whately says that he "wanted to do something that was complementary to their show, but that was new and very different". Another reason he chose to do the film at the time was because of Bowie's absence for ten years from releasing any new music, "I think there was an appetite that's been, extraordinarily, only partly sated by the V&A exhibition and the new album, The Next Day, he's just released".

He says that he chose the title "Five Years", because in his opinion those years he highlights in the 1970s and early 1980s, are "where he’s changing direction pretty radically". Whately used his team to scour through hours of material and transcripts from Bowie's various appearances on radio and television, journalist interviews he gave, promotional material from the record labels, and unseen outtakes.

When asked about Bowie's involvement with the project, Whately says Bowie "knew what was going on behind the scenes", and they stayed in touch, but it was never "really about the film". He also says that when the film was nearing completion, Bowie contacted him, asking to preview the film before it was released. Whately's response to Bowie's request was "absolutely not". What he ended up doing was sending a copy of the film to him in New York, to coincide with the release of the documentary on BBC Two. He said Bowie sent him an email afterwards, declaring; "I'm very proud of you, Francis". Whately went on to note that "Bowie never, ever wanted an authorised film made about him. He made that very clear". Additionally, he said that every person he contacted to appear in the film, "whether it was Carlos Alomar or Earl Slick, they all checked with David that I was okay".

I've always found that I collect, I'm a collector, and I've always just seemed to collect personalities ... ideas.

— David Bowie

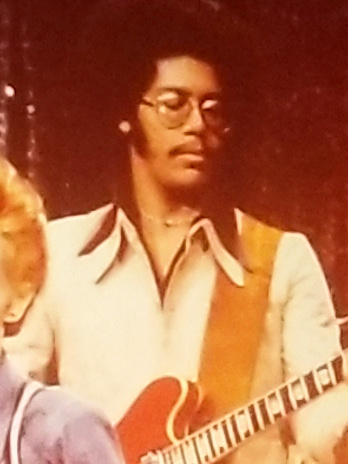
Carlos Alomar (pictured in 1974).

Two of the things Whately wanted to illustrate through the five pivotal years in Bowie's career, was what Bowie has always been best at, his music and his image. He started with: 1971 to 1972, the year of his breakthrough with Ziggy Stardust; then moved on to 1975, the year of Young Americans; both Low and Heroes in 1977; Scary Monsters in 1980; and ending with 1983, the year of Let's Dance. These selected years show how Bowie has always been able to redefine himself. In interviews shown in the film, Bowie confirms his different stages of rebranding, stating, "I think I wanted to re-evaluate what I did musically, and producer Brian Eno helped open up new doors of perception as well". British music critic Sam Wollaston remarked about his stylistic changes over the years; "I loved every one of him – from fedora-wearing hippy through various aliens, insects, ghosts, etc to the tanned blond yuppie pop star of the Serious Moonlight Tour".

In outtakes from interviews with various band members and musicians he collaborated with, they remember their first time meeting Bowie. In one notable interview shown in the film, guitarist Carlos Alomar recalls his first time meeting Bowie; "I didn't know who David Bowie was, but I did know that this was the whitest man I'd ever seen – I'm not talking white-like-pink, I'm talking about translucent white, and he had orange hair, and was thin and weighed about 98 pounds. Weird." Nonetheless, he joined Bowie, and "they got along famously", staying with him for three decades; playing on more Bowie albums than any other musician, with the exception being pianist Mike Garson.

== Reception ==
British journalist Andrew Billen from The Times wrote, "despite some great moments, including the real privilege of seeing Bowie's performance as the Elephant Man on Broadway, this was a less enjoyable film than those on the Stones, Freddie Mercury or Simon & Garfunkel – odd since Bowie's music is more interesting than theirs". Pitchfork opined it is a "solid fan-service doc that details five remarkably productive periods of Bowie’s career". Mike Higgins from The Independent said his favorite scene was "from the recording of Young Americans, a twitching, snorting Bowie telling a bemused-looking Luther Vandross how to sing his (very) white man's soul music. Golden years, indeed".

British author Nicholas Pegg said among the "film's pleasures are a wealth of rare footage that was unearthed for the film, of which the show-stopper was a series of previously unseen monochrome outtakes from Cracked Actor, showing Bowie and his band performing "Right" ... intelligently structured, beautifully edited and benefiting from a splendid consultant, the documentary set a high standard for future Bowie documentaries". In the Journal of Media Practice, they noted how Bowie "rounds on an interviewer for daring to suggest that he is a rock star (perhaps conjuring up the ghost of Arthur Seaton – 'whatever people say I am, that's what I'm not')", and they also opined that "even behind the multiple fictional personae, the real persona of David Bowie was always already a fiction adopted to distinguish this performer from that performer (Davy Jones of the Monkees), and Bowie itself is a slippery signifier given that Bowie himself joked about the undecided nature of how to pronounce it in an interview with Jeremy Paxman shown in the film".

British music journalist Michael Deacons sarcasm shone through in his review, writing; "in the early days of his career, David Bowie made one mistake: opening his mouth ... not to sing – he was pretty good at that – but to speak. Today you look back at TV interviews with the young Bowie, this supernatural pop being – thin as a cigarette, shop-dummy skin, a smile like broken glass – and you expect to hear a voice sounding somewhere between Satan and Withnail. And instead you hear a voice like a cockney chimney sweep". On a high note, Deacon says the film "was celebration more than investigation – but the footage made it a long and satisfying dip in the bubble-bath of nostalgia". Sam Wollaston from The Guardian said the "footage – some rare, some unseen – is mesmerising ... I love the outtakes of recordings that go wrong – when you see him suddenly crash out of character ... his humour too, mischievous and sarcastic, is evident in a hilarious interview with Russell Harty".

I never expected all this to happen. In the sixties I was told I was too avant-garde to be successful.

— David Bowie

Canadian television critic John Doyle wrote that Whately "attempts to condense Bowie's career and impact into five neat chapters ... through a ton of fascinating archival footage – but we don't get the full picture". He goes on to say "there are interesting comments, from the late Mick Ronson ... Bowie himself is heard talking about 'using rock 'n' roll' rather than entering into it ... culture critic Camille Paglia makes some nutty remarks about Bowie's self-proclaimed god status ... this is all interesting, but superficial ... missing entirely from the doc is any consideration of the influence of avant-garde art theory on Bowie's self-actualized personae ... so, short on theory, but rich in footage and interviews". He concludes by opining; "the film ends with Bowie's leap into vast commercial success in the mid-1980s ... we get the idea that Bowie is a cultural icon and innovator, but for all the enjoyable footage and interviews the approach is superficial".

== Accolades ==
Year	Award	Category	Result	Ref.
2014	British Academy Television Craft Awards	Best Sound: Factual	Won	
2014	Focal International Awards	Best Use of Music Performance Footage	Won	

== See also ==
- David Bowie discography
- David Bowie filmography
- David Bowie: The Last Five Years
- List of songs recorded by David Bowie
