= Bowie: The Final Act =

2025 documentary film

- Directed by: Jonathan Stiasny
- Produced by: Daniel Hall
- Cinematography: various
- Edited by: Neil Clarkson; Jess Illingworth
- Music by: Tom Howe; Mike Reed
- Production companies: Arte; Bayerischer Rundfunk; DR Danish Broadcasting; Dogwoof; NTR; Rogan Productions; WDR Rundfunkorchester
- Distributed by: Arte; Channel 4; Dogwoof
- Release date: December 26, 2025
- Running time: 92 minutes
- Country: United Kingdom
- Language: English

Bowie: The Final Act is a 2025 documentary film about David Bowie, directed by Jonathan Stiasny.

== Scenario ==
The film covers Bowie's life and work, using archive footage and interviews with musicians, friends, colleagues, and journalists.

== Interviewees ==
- David Bowie (archive)
- Dana Gillespie
- Gary Kemp
- Goldie
- Moby
- Rick Wakeman
- Hanif Kureishi
- Chris Hadfield
- Jayne Middlemiss
- Dylan Jones
- Jon Wilde
- Reeves Gabrels
- Tony Visconti
- Mike Garson
- Erin Tonkon
- Jason Lindner

== Reception ==
On the review aggregator website Rotten Tomatoes, 70% of 10 critics' reviews are positive. Metacritic, which uses a weighted average, assigned the film a score of 68 out of 100, based on four critics, indicating "generally favorable" reviews.

In The Guardian, Rhik Samadder wrote: "The film’s unusual theme is the minor notes of a stellar career. The poorly received albums, crises of confidence. ... Director Jonathan Stiasny’s film is no hagiography, yet it’s apparent he loves the Bowie myth as much as anyone. Thank God. There’s rapture in those images of Ziggy Stardust, that immortal face under all the reinventions, the hair that stayed perfect."

In The Times, Ed Potton gave the film 5/5 stars, writing: "Jonathan Stiasny’s moving documentary about the star’s late-life comeback packs a real punch. ... Like the man, this film isn’t sentimental but gosh, it packs a punch."

In The Telegraph, Ed Power gave 2/5 stars, writing: "A decade on from his death, the story of David Bowie’s last years is reduced to a haphazard highlights reel in the underwhelming David Bowie: the Final Act ... After starting with Blackstar, the film quickly loses focus, hopping across Bowie’s career in fits and starts. It lingers inordinately on his critically panned Tin Machine project, jumps back to his final concert with the Spiders from Mars at Hammersmith Odeon in 1973, then pings forward to his mid‑1990s drum‑and‑bass phase (likewise loathed by critics). ... Amid the zigzagging, the film at least lines up some impressive interviewees."

For Uncut, Peter Watts gave 4.5/5 stars, and wrote: "Stiasny accepts that, at this point at least, there isn’t a great deal that is new to be said about Bowie’s music, his chameleon-like instincts or his unparalleled ability to assimilate unexpected new influences into his work. Bowie: The Final Act chooses to tell that story in a different and more original way, highlighting the overlooked or dismissed parts of Bowie’s biography to reveal a bigger picture. ... It’s an unusual format, but Stiasny leans on an excellent pool of interviewees."

Tara Brady of The Irish Times gave 3/5 stars, writing: "Bowie: The Final Act offers an amiable if scattershot overview that hopscotches between early Glastonbury, Ziggy Stardust and Blackstar. ... Bizarrely, Earthling, Bowie’s 1999 flirtation with drum and bass, also receives more attention than bigger, better albums, including Low and Black Tie White Noise. No matter. This is a fond requiem from a Bowie fan, made with reverence for his art and respect for his privacy. Save for two brief glimpses of Bowie’s son, Zowie (aka the film-maker Duncan Jones), and daughter, Alexandria Zahra Jones, there are no domestic details, no salacious allusions to his cocaine-powered pansexual era."

In the Financial Times, Jonathan Romney gave 2/5 stars, writing: "Stiasny largely focuses on key moments from the late 1980s on, after Bowie emerged disillusioned from his huge international success in that decade. ...There was certainly plenty in Bowie’s final years that merits closer attention, such as his enthusiastic promotion of his literary tastes; the Lazarus stage show; and his marriage to Iman, seen in photos but never mentioned. And there’s much more to be said about the making of his last two LPs ... Stiasny’s account feels scrappy and unfocused, though it contains occasional grist."
