= Francis Whately =

British television producer and director

- Born: United Kingdom
- Occupations: Television producer, director
- Years active: 1998-present
- Notable work: David Bowie: Five Years

Francis Whately is a British television producer, director and series director who started his career in 1998 and worked for BBC for over 20 years. The documentary films he directed were mainly about music. He produced David Bowie: Five Years (2013), Kim Philby – His Most Intimate Betrayal (2014), Judi Dench: All the World's Her Stage (2016), Rock ‘n’ Roll Guns for Hire: The Story of the Sidemen (2017), David Bowie: The Last Five Years (2017), and David Bowie: Finding Fame (2019).

== Partial Filmography ==
Name	Year
Darwin's Dangerous Idea	2009
The Most Courageous Raid of WWII	2011
David Bowie: Five Years	2013
Kim Philby: His Most Intimate Betrayal	2014
Hillary Clinton: The Power of Women	2015
Judi Dench: All the World's Her Stage	2016
Rock 'n' Roll Guns for Hire: The Story of the Sidemen	2017
David Bowie: The Last Five Years	2017
David Bowie: Finding Fame	2019
Rebel Country	2024

== Accolades ==
FOCAL Archive Award for David Bowie Five Years (2014.06)

BAFTA for David Bowie Five Years (2014.04)

BAFTA for the series Andrew Marr's 'History of Modern Britain' (the third director) (2007.05)

== Major works ==
=== David Bowie: Five Years ===
This documentary focuses on five key years in David Bowie's career: 1971–1972, 1974–1975, 1976–1977, 1979–1980, and 1982–1983. It comments on Bowie's change of image, from Ziggy Stardust to the soul star of Young Americans, to "The Thin White Duke", using archive material.

=== David Bowie: The Last Five years ===
This documentary continued the previous method of presenting David Bowie’s life by interviewing others. It was broadcast a year after Bowie’s death and also received widespread attention. Instead of interviewing Bowie’s friends and family about his heart attack and later cancer diagnosis, Francis Whately interviewed the musicians who collaborated with David Bowie on his last two albums (Blackstar and The Next Day) and the New York musical Lazarus. This documentary showed Bowie’s innovation in the last five years of his life after nearly a decade of silence.

=== Rock 'n' Roll Guns for Hire: The Story of the Sidemen ===
The documentary mainly focused on the musicians who work behind some of the greatest artists such as Prince, David Bowie, The Rolling Stones and Beyoncé and make contribution to change musical history. Those musicians, called ‘Guns for Hire’ in the documentary, are the people who play at live shows and often even contribute to recordings as songwriters or session musicians.

=== Judi Dench: All the World's Her Stage ===
The documentary examines the 60-year acting career of Judi Dench, and presents aspects of her life and career through archival material and interviews, offering a different perspective compared to earlier documentaries.

== Stories behind ==
Francis Whately hung a David Bowie poster on the wall of his home when he was a teenager, and described Bowie as his hero in a series of subsequent interviews. The first meeting of Whately and Bowie was in 1998 at which time, Whatelhad just finished 100 Works, an episode of British sculpture, and Bowie had contributed his voice and words to this short film. Before that time, Whately and Bowie's exchanges were conducted by telephone and letters. Whately was very nervous and excited about seeing his hero, but Bowie's courteous and polite manner made the conversation more comfortable. After that, Whately and Bowie kept in touch until Bowie died.

Bowie and Whately formed a good relationship. Although they rarely spoke about music, they were interested in many of the same things and often discussed the books and arts that they admired. In the 1990s, Bowie often make called Whately. At that time, Bowie was writing for an art magazine whilst Whately made a number of art films and was very interested in contemporary arts; they always had common interests to talk about.

Although the two documentaries, David Bowie: Five Years and David Bowie: The Last Five Years both include recorded the interviews from others, the themes and shooting methods are quite different. The first one was basic on David Bowie’s request; instead of making a conventional biography about him being born and moving through his life chronologically, the director has used more contemporary editing and collage to show the most important five years in Bowie’s life. While during filming David Bowie: The Last Five Years, Bowie was very careful about his privacy and didn't give Whately the opportunity to interview him. So there's no interview videos of Bowie’s last five years in this documentary. Whately interviewed the musicians who have cooperated with Bowie in his last two albums: Blackstar and The Next Day and interviewed them in the Jazz Bar 55° which located in New York center. By representing the nervous and secret recording process from the musicians’ perspective, the film has shown Bowie's enthusiasm on music.

The director himself thinks that the difference between the two documentaries is that in the first one he wanted to show to audience a changeable Bowie, while the second one did not focus on how much he changed, but his unchanging enthusiasm for music.

David Bowie: The Last Five Years was on the air on HBO on January 8, 2017, which would have been David Bowie' s 71st birthday.
