= David Bowie =

English musician and actor (1947–2016)

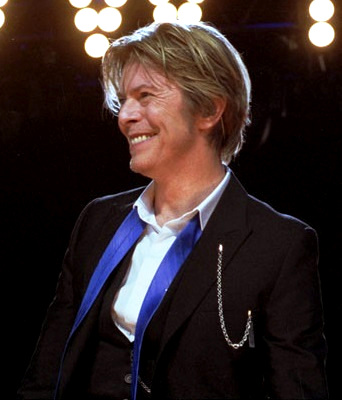
- Bowie in 2002
- Born: David Robert Jones; 8 January 1947; London, England
- Died: 10 January 2016 (aged 69); New York City, US
- Occupations: Singer; songwriter; musician; actor; producer
- Years active: 1962–2016
- Works: Discography; songs; videography; filmography
- Spouses: Angie Barnett (m. 1970; div. 1980) Iman (m. 1992)
- Children: Duncan; Lexi
- Awards: Full list
- Musical career
- Genres: Art rock; glam rock; pop; electronic
- Instruments: Vocals; guitar; keyboards; saxophone; harmonica
- Labels: Vocalion; Parlophone; Pye; Warner Bros.; Deram; Mercury; Philips; Decca; RCA; EMI America; Ryko; EMI; Rhino; Arista; Savage; Golden Years; Virgin; BMG; ISO; Columbia; Sony BMG; Legacy; Sony
- Formerly of: The Konrads; The King Bees; The Manish Boys; The Lower Third; The Riot Squad; Hype; Arnold Corns; Tin Machine
- Past members: Full list
- Website: Official website

David Robert Jones (8 January 1947 – 10 January 2016), known as David Bowie, (Note: /ˈboʊi/ BOH-ee) was an English singer, songwriter and actor. Regarded as among the most influential musicians of the 20th century, he was known for his frequent reinvention and visual presentation, and is often referred to as the "chameleon of rock". His music, stagecraft and fashion have had a significant impact on popular culture.

Bowie studied art, music and design before embarking on a music career in 1962. He released a string of unsuccessful singles with local bands and a self-titled solo album before achieving his first success in 1969 with "Space Oddity", a UK number-five single from his self-titled second album. His major commercial breakthrough came in 1972, during the glam rock era, with the Ziggy Stardust character and its accompanying album, The Rise and Fall of Ziggy Stardust and the Spiders from Mars. In 1974, he changed direction and adopted a new persona, Halloween Jack, for the album Diamond Dogs. The soul-influenced Young Americans (1975) was followed by Station to Station (1976), which saw him adopt the Thin White Duke persona and begin taking his music towards art rock, electronica and ambient. Bowie explored these styles most fully with the Berlin Trilogy: Low, "Heroes" (both 1977) and Lodger (1979). He achieved his greatest commercial success with Let's Dance in 1983. From 1988 to 1992, he fronted the hard rock band Tin Machine. Bowie resumed his solo career in 1993 and continued experimenting with musical styles, including industrial, jungle and drum and bass.

Outside of music, Bowie received recognition for his acting roles, emphasising smaller parts and cameos rather than leading roles. His best-known films include The Man Who Fell to Earth (1976), Merry Christmas, Mr. Lawrence (1983), Absolute Beginners, Labyrinth (both 1986), Twin Peaks: Fire Walk with Me (1992), Basquiat (1996), and The Prestige (2006). He was also a painter and writer, created the first modern celebrity bond ("Bowie Bonds") and, via his website BowieNet, was one of the first artists to engage with fans directly through the Internet. He performed live regularly throughout his career, before retiring from touring in 2004; his last live performance was at a charity event in 2006. He returned from a decade-long recording hiatus in 2013 with The Next Day. His final studio album, Blackstar, released two days before his death in 2016, was analysed as a powerful farewell to his fans.

During his lifetime, his record sales were estimated at over 100 million worldwide, making him one of the best-selling musicians of all time. He achieved eleven UK number-one albums, including Aladdin Sane (1973) and Scary Monsters (and Super Creeps) (1980), and had UK or US number-one singles with "Space Oddity" (which reached number-one in the UK on reissue in 1975), "Fame", "Ashes to Ashes", "Under Pressure" (with Queen), "Let's Dance", and "Dancing in the Street" (with Mick Jagger). He is the recipient of numerous accolades, including six Grammy Awards and four Brit Awards. He was inducted into the Rock and Roll Hall of Fame in 1996. Rolling Stone ranked him among the greatest singers, songwriters and artists of all time. Although his sexuality is disputed, he is regarded as an influential figure in the LGBTQ community.

== Early life ==
David Robert Jones was born on 8 January 1947 in Brixton, London. His mother, Margaret Mary "Peggy" (née Burns), was born at Shorncliffe Army Camp, Kent. She was a waitress at a cinema in Royal Tunbridge Wells. His father, Haywood Stenton "John" Jones, was from Doncaster, Yorkshire, and was a promotions officer for the children's charity Barnardo's. The family lived at 40 Stansfield Road in the south London borough of Lambeth. Bowie attended Stockwell Infants School until he was six, acquiring a reputation as a gifted and single-minded child—and a defiant brawler.

From 1953, Bowie moved with his family to Bickley and then Bromley Common, before settling in Sundridge Park in 1955 where he attended Burnt Ash Junior School. His voice was considered "adequate" by the school choir, and he demonstrated above-average ability on the recorder. At the age of nine, his dancing was strikingly imaginative: teachers called his interpretations "vividly artistic" and his poise "astonishing" for a child. The same year, his father brought home a collection of American 45s by artists including the Teenagers, the Platters, Fats Domino, Elvis Presley and Little Richard. Upon listening to Little Richard's song "Tutti Frutti", Bowie later said that he had "heard God".

Bowie was first impressed with Presley when he saw his cousin Kristina dance to "Hound Dog" soon after its release in 1956. According to Kristina, she and David "danced like possessed elves" to records of various artists. By the end of the following year, Bowie had taken up the ukulele and tea-chest bass, begun to participate in skiffle sessions with friends, and had started to play the piano; his stage presentation of numbers by both Presley and Chuck Berry—complete with gyrations in tribute to the original artists—to his local Wolf Cub group was described as "mesmerizing ... like someone from another planet". Having encouraged his son to follow his dreams of being an entertainer since he was a toddler, in the late 1950s David's father took him to meet performers preparing for the Royal Variety Performance, introducing him to Alma Cogan and Tommy Steele. After taking his eleven-plus exam, Bowie went to Bromley Technical High School, which biographer Christopher Sandford described as "rich in arcane ritual as any [English] public school".

Bowie's maternal half-brother, Terry Burns, was a substantial influence on his early life. Burns, who was 10 years older, had schizophrenia and seizures, and lived alternately at home and in psychiatric wards. While living with Bowie, he introduced the younger man to many of his lifelong influences, such as modern jazz, Buddhism, Beat poetry and the occult. In addition to Burns, a significant proportion of Bowie's extended family members had schizophrenia spectrum disorders, including an aunt who was institutionalised and another who underwent a lobotomy; this has been labelled as an influence on his early work.

Bowie studied art, music and design. After Burns introduced him to modern jazz, his enthusiasm for players like Charles Mingus and John Coltrane led his mother to give him a Grafton saxophone in 1961. He was soon receiving lessons from baritone saxophonist Ronnie Ross.

He received a serious injury at school in 1962 when his friend George Underwood punched him in the left eye during a fight over a girl. After a series of operations during a four-month hospitalisation, the damage could not be fully repaired and Bowie was left with faulty depth perception and anisocoria (a permanently dilated pupil); his eye later became one of Bowie's most recognisable features. Despite their altercation, Bowie remained on good terms with Underwood, who went on to create the artwork for Bowie's early albums.

In 1961 he met Peter Frampton, who was three years younger. They were schoolmates at Bromley Technical High School. Frampton's band the Little Ravens played on the same bill at school as Bowie's band, George and the Dragons. Peter and David would spend lunch breaks together, playing Buddy Holly songs.

== Music career ==
=== 1962–1967: Early career to debut album ===
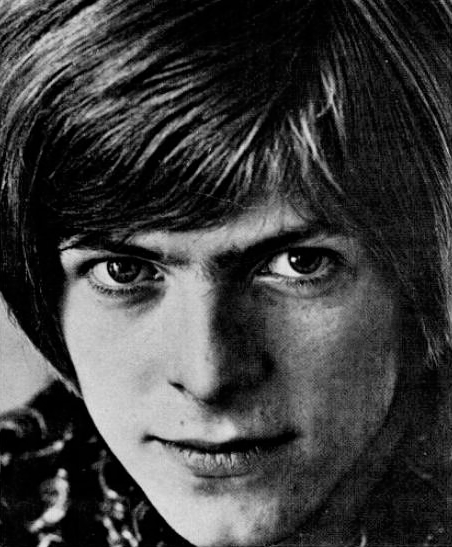
A trade ad photo of Bowie in 1967

Bowie formed his first band, the Konrads, in 1962 at the age of 15. Playing guitar-based rock and roll at local youth gatherings and weddings, the Konrads had a varying line-up of between four and eight members, Underwood among them. When Bowie left the technical school the following year, he informed his parents of his intention to become a pop star. His mother arranged his employment as an electrician's mate. Frustrated by his bandmates' limited aspirations, Bowie left the Konrads and joined another band, the King Bees. Soon after, he signed his first personal management contract with Dick James' partner Leslie Conn.

Bowie's debut single, "Liza Jane", credited to Davie Jones with the King Bees, was not commercially successful. Dissatisfied with the King Bees and their repertoire of Howlin' Wolf and Willie Dixon covers, Bowie quit the band less than a month later to join the Manish Boys, another blues outfit, who incorporated folk and soul. Their cover of Bobby Bland's "I Pity the Fool", produced by ex-pat American Shel Talmy, was no more successful than "Liza Jane", and Bowie soon left to join forces with the Lower Third, a blues trio strongly influenced by the Who. "You've Got a Habit of Leaving", also supervised by Talmy, fared no better, signalling the end of Conn's contract. Declaring that he would exit music "to study mime at Sadler's Wells", Bowie nevertheless remained with the Lower Third. His new manager, Ralph Horton, later instrumental in his transition to solo artist, helped secure him a contract with Pye Records. Publicist Tony Hatch signed Bowie on the basis that he wrote his own songs. Dissatisfied with Davy (and Davie) Jones, which in the mid-1960s invited confusion with Davy Jones of the Monkees, he took on the stage name David Bowie after the 19th-century American pioneer James Bowie and the knife he had popularised. His first release under the name was the January 1966 single "Can't Help Thinking About Me", recorded with the Lower Third. It flopped like its predecessors.

With Horton's influence, Bowie departed the Lower Third, and released two more singles for Pye, "Do Anything You Say" and "I Dig Everything", both of which featured a new band called the Buzz, before signing with Deram Records. Around this time Bowie also joined the freakbeat group the Riot Squad; their recordings, which included one of Bowie's original songs and material by the Velvet Underground, went unreleased. Kenneth Pitt, introduced by Horton, took over as Bowie's manager. His April 1967 solo single, "The Laughing Gnome", on which speeded-up and high-pitched vocals were used to portray the gnome, failed to chart. Released six weeks later, his album debut, David Bowie, an amalgam of pop, psychedelia and music hall, met the same fate. It was his last release for two years. In September, Bowie recorded "Let Me Sleep Beside You" and "Karma Man", both rejected by Deram and left unreleased until 1970. The tracks marked the beginning of Bowie's working relationship with producer Tony Visconti which, with large gaps, lasted for the rest of Bowie's career.

=== 1968–1971: Space Oddity to Hunky Dory ===
Studying the dramatic arts under Lindsay Kemp, from avant-garde theatre and mime to commedia dell'arte, Bowie became immersed in the creation of personae to present to the world. Satirising life in a British prison, his composition "Over the Wall We Go" became a 1967 single for Oscar; another Bowie song, "Silly Boy Blue", was released by Billy Fury the following year. Playing acoustic guitar, Hermione Farthingale formed a group with Bowie and guitarist John Hutchinson named Feathers; between September 1968 and early 1969 the trio gave a few concerts combining folk, Merseybeat, poetry and mime.

After the break-up with Farthingale, Bowie moved in with Mary Finnigan as her lodger. In February and March 1969, he undertook a short tour with Marc Bolan's duo Tyrannosaurus Rex, as third on the bill, performing a mime act. Continuing the divergence from rock and roll and blues begun by his work with Farthingale, Bowie joined forces with Finnigan, Christina Ostrom and Barrie Jackson to run a folk club on Sunday nights at the Three Tuns pub in Beckenham High Street. The club was influenced by the Arts Lab movement, developing into the Beckenham Arts Lab and became extremely popular. The Arts Lab hosted a free festival in a local park, the subject of his song "Memory of a Free Festival".

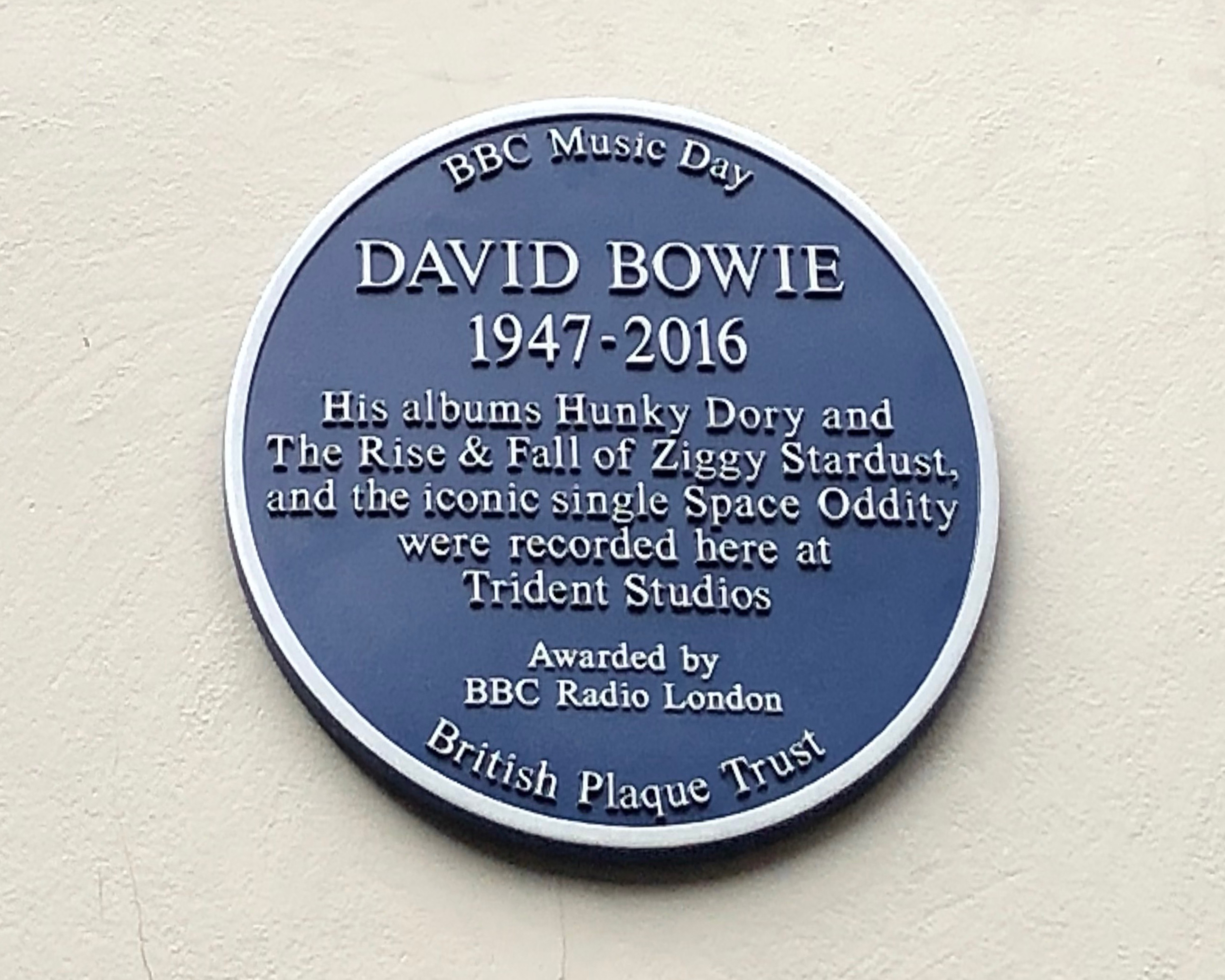
Plaque at Trident Studios in London marking where Bowie recorded six albums between 1969 and 1974

Pitt attempted to introduce Bowie to a larger audience with the Love You till Tuesday film, which went unreleased until 1984. Feeling alienated over his unsuccessful career and deeply affected by his break-up, Bowie wrote "Space Oddity", a tale about a fictional astronaut named Major Tom. The song earned him a contract with Mercury Records and its UK subsidiary Philips, who issued "Space Oddity" as a single on 11 July 1969, five days ahead of the Apollo 11 launch. Reaching the top five in the UK, it was his first and last hit for three years. Bowie's second album followed in November. Originally issued in the UK as David Bowie, it caused some confusion with its predecessor of the same name, and the US release was instead titled Man of Words/Man of Music; it was reissued internationally in 1972 by RCA Records as Space Oddity. Featuring philosophical post-hippie lyrics about peace, love and morality, its acoustic folk rock occasionally fortified by harder rock, the album was not a commercial success at the time.

In early 1970 Bowie formed the band The Hype, originally titled 'The David Bowie Band' for their first gig on 22 February 1970 at the Roundhouse in London, supporting Noel Redding's Fat Mattress. The band has been credited with helping to form the glam rock scene in the 1970s.

Bowie had met Angela Barnett in April 1969. They married within a year. Her impact on him was immediate—he wrote his 1970 single "The Prettiest Star" for her—and her involvement in his career was far-reaching, leaving Pitt with limited influence which he found frustrating. Bowie soon fired Pitt and replaced him with Tony Defries, resulting in years of litigation that concluded with Bowie having to pay Pitt compensation. The follow-up to David Bowie, The Man Who Sold the World, was released in November 1970 in the US and April 1971 in the UK. The album featured Visconti on bass, Mick Ronson on electric guitar and Mick Woodmansey on drums. It represented a departure from the folk rock style of his second album to a more hard rock sound, with lyrical references to schizophrenia, paranoia and delusion. Mercury financed a coast-to-coast publicity tour across the US in which Bowie, between January and February 1971, was interviewed by the media. Exploiting his androgynous appearance, he wore a blue dress during interviews, the same one that had appeared on the cover of the then-unreleased UK version of The Man Who Sold the World.

During the tour, Bowie's observation of two seminal American proto-punk artists led him to develop a concept that eventually found form in the Ziggy Stardust character: a melding of the persona of his friend Iggy Pop with the music of Lou Reed, producing "the ultimate pop idol". Bowie later stated, "It's not who does it first, it's who does it second." A girlfriend recalled his "scrawling notes on a cocktail napkin about a crazy rock star named Iggy or Ziggy", and on his return to England he declared his intention to create a character "who looks like he's landed from Mars". The "Stardust" surname was a tribute to the "Legendary Stardust Cowboy", whose record he was given during the tour. Bowie later covered "I Took a Trip on a Gemini Space Ship" on 2002's Heathen.

Hunky Dory (1971) found Visconti supplanted in both roles by Ken Scott producing and Trevor Bolder on bass. It again featured a stylistic shift towards art pop and melodic pop rock, with light fare tracks such as "Kooks", a song written for his son, Duncan Zowie Haywood Jones, born on 30 May. Elsewhere, the album explored more serious subjects, and found Bowie paying unusually direct homage to his influences with "Song for Bob Dylan", "Andy Warhol" and "Queen Bitch", the latter a Velvet Underground pastiche. His first release through RCA, it was a commercial failure, partly due lack of promotion from the label. Peter Noone of Herman's Hermits covered the album's track "Oh! You Pretty Things", which reached number 12 in the UK.

=== 1972–1974: Glam rock era ===
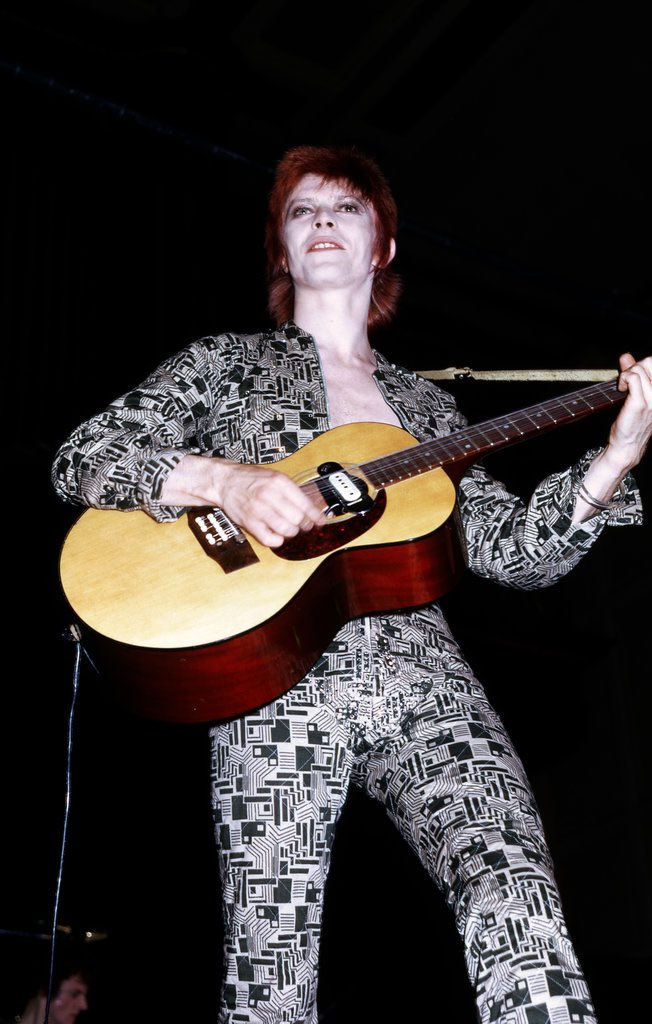
Bowie during the Ziggy Stardust Tour, 1972

Dressed in a striking costume, his hair dyed reddish-brown, Bowie launched his Ziggy Stardust stage show with the Spiders from Mars—Ronson, Bolder, and Woodmansey—at the Toby Jug pub in Tolworth in Kingston upon Thames on 10 February 1972. The show was hugely popular, catapulting him to stardom as he toured the UK over the next six months and creating, as described by David Buckley, a "cult of Bowie" that was "unique—its influence lasted longer and has been more creative than perhaps almost any other force within pop fandom." The Rise and Fall of Ziggy Stardust and the Spiders from Mars (1972), combining the hard rock elements of The Man Who Sold the World with the lighter experimental rock and pop of Hunky Dory, was released in June and was considered one of the defining albums of glam rock. "Starman", issued as an April single ahead of the album, was to cement Bowie's UK breakthrough: both single and album charted rapidly following his July Top of the Pops performance of the song. The album, which remained in the chart for two years, was soon joined there by the six-month-old Hunky Dory. At the same time, the non-album single "John, I'm Only Dancing" and "All the Young Dudes", a song he wrote and produced for Mott the Hoople, were successful in the UK. The Ziggy Stardust Tour continued to the United States.

Bowie contributed backing vocals, keyboards and guitar to Reed's 1972 solo breakthrough Transformer, co-producing the album with Ronson. The following year, Bowie co-produced and mixed the Stooges' album Raw Power alongside Iggy Pop. His own Aladdin Sane (1973) was his first UK number-one album. Described by Bowie as "Ziggy goes to America", it contained songs he wrote while travelling to and across the US during the earlier part of the Ziggy tour, which now continued to Japan to promote the new album. Aladdin Sane spawned the UK top five singles "The Jean Genie" and "Drive-In Saturday".

Bowie's love of acting led to his total immersion in the characters he created for his music. "Offstage I'm a robot. Onstage I achieve emotion. It's probably why I prefer dressing up as Ziggy to being David." With satisfaction came severe personal difficulties: acting the same role over an extended period, it became impossible for him to separate Ziggy Stardust—and later, the Thin White Duke—from his own character offstage. Ziggy, Bowie said, "wouldn't leave me alone for years. That was when it all started to go sour ... My whole personality was affected. It became very dangerous. I really did have doubts about my sanity." His later Ziggy shows, which included songs from both Ziggy Stardust and Aladdin Sane, were ultra-theatrical affairs filled with shocking stage moments, such as Bowie stripping down to a sumo wrestling loincloth or simulating oral sex with Ronson's guitar. Bowie toured and gave press conferences as Ziggy before a dramatic and abrupt on-stage "retirement" at London's Hammersmith Odeon on 3 July 1973. Footage from the final show was incorporated for the film Ziggy Stardust and the Spiders from Mars, which premiered in 1979 and commercially released in 1983.

"Ziggy Stardust"
Sample of "Ziggy Stardust" (1972). A pioneer of glam rock, Bowie performed as the character Ziggy Stardust, backed by the Spiders from Mars.

After breaking up the Spiders, Bowie attempted to move on from his Ziggy persona. His back catalogue was now highly sought after: The Man Who Sold the World had been re-released in 1972 along with Space Oddity. Hunky Dory's "Life on Mars?" was released in June 1973 and peaked at number three on the UK Singles Chart. Entering the same chart in September, his 1967 novelty record "The Laughing Gnome" reached number six. Pin Ups, a collection of covers of his 1960s favourites, followed in October, producing a UK number three hit in his version of the McCoys's "Sorrow" and itself peaking at number one, making Bowie the best-selling act of 1973 in the UK. It brought the total number of Bowie albums concurrently on the UK chart to six.

=== 1974–1976: "Plastic soul" and the Thin White Duke ===
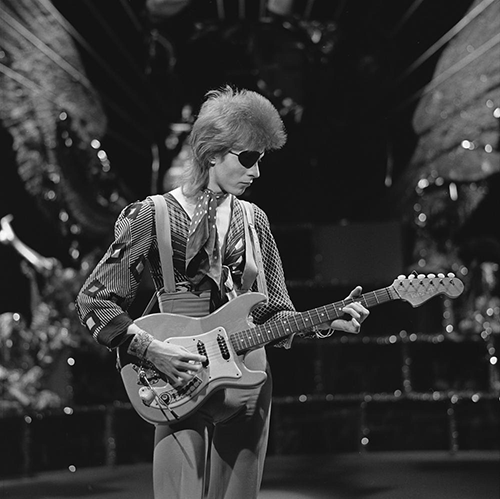
Bowie performing "Rebel Rebel" on TopPop in February 1974

Bowie moved to the US in 1974, initially staying in New York City before settling in Los Angeles. Diamond Dogs (1974), parts of which found him heading towards soul and funk, was the product of two distinct ideas: a musical based on a wild future in a post-apocalyptic city, and setting George Orwell's Nineteen Eighty-Four to music. Its title track introduced a new persona, Halloween Jack, who "lives on top of Manhattan Chase" and ruled over the "diamond dogs". The album went to number one in the UK, spawning the hits "Rebel Rebel" and "Diamond Dogs", and number five in the US. The supporting Diamond Dogs Tour visited cities in North America between June and December 1974. Choreographed by Toni Basil, and lavishly produced with theatrical special effects, the high-budget stage production was filmed by Alan Yentob. The resulting documentary, Cracked Actor, depicted Bowie's worsening cocaine addiction. A live album from the tour, David Live, solidified Bowie's status as a superstar, charting at number two in the UK and number eight in the US. It also spawned a UK number ten hit in a cover of Eddie Floyd's "Knock on Wood". After a break in Philadelphia, where Bowie recorded new material, the tour resumed with a new emphasis on soul.

The Philadelphia recording sessions produced the album Young Americans (1975). Sandford writes, "Over the years, most British rockers had tried, one way or another, to become black-by-extension. Few had succeeded as Bowie did now." The album's sound, which Bowie identified as "plastic soul", constituted a radical shift in style that initially alienated many of his UK devotees. Young Americans was a commercial success in both the US and the UK and yielded Bowie's first US number one, "Fame", a collaboration with John Lennon. A re-issue of the 1969 single "Space Oddity" became Bowie's first number-one hit in the UK a few months after "Fame" achieved the same in the US. He mimed "Fame" and his November single "Golden Years" on the US variety show Soul Train, earning him the distinction of being one of the first white artists to appear on the programme. The same year, Bowie fired Defries as his manager. Michael Lippman, Bowie's lawyer during the months-long legal negotiations, became his new manager, but was fired the following year.

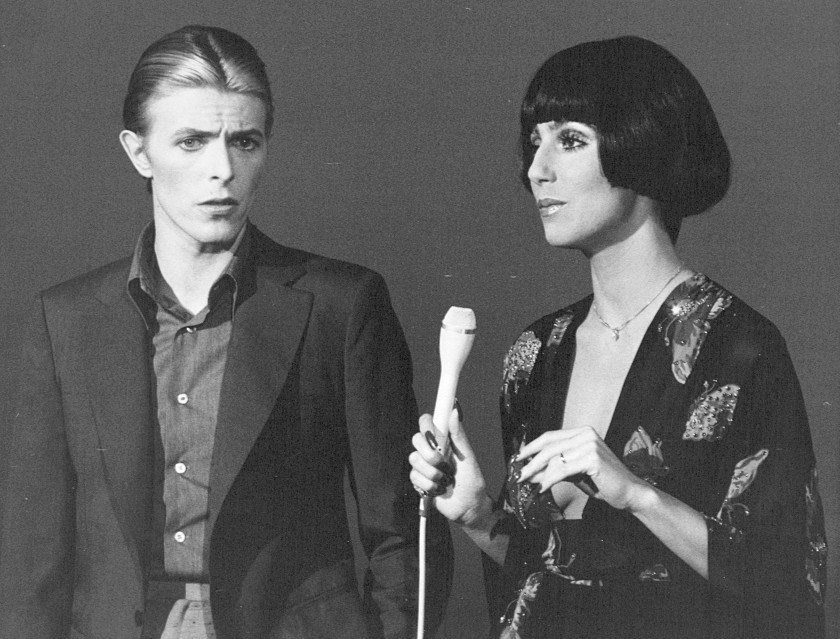
Bowie, in his American TV debut, performs with Cher on the variety show Cher, 1975.

Station to Station (1976), produced by Bowie and Harry Maslin, introduced a new Bowie persona, the Thin White Duke of its title track. Visually, the character was an extension of Thomas Jerome Newton, the extraterrestrial being he portrayed in the film The Man Who Fell to Earth the same year. Developing the funk and soul of Young Americans, Station to Station's synthesiser-heavy arrangements were influenced by electronic and German krautrock. Bowie's cocaine addiction during this period was at its peak; he often did not sleep for three to four days at a time during Station to Station's recording sessions and later said he remembered "only flashes" of its making. The album's release was followed by a 3 1/2-month-long concert tour, the Isolar Tour, of Europe and North America. The core band that coalesced to record the album and tour—rhythm guitarist Carlos Alomar, bassist George Murray and drummer Dennis Davis—continued as a stable unit for the remainder of the 1970s. Bowie performed on stage as the Thin White Duke.

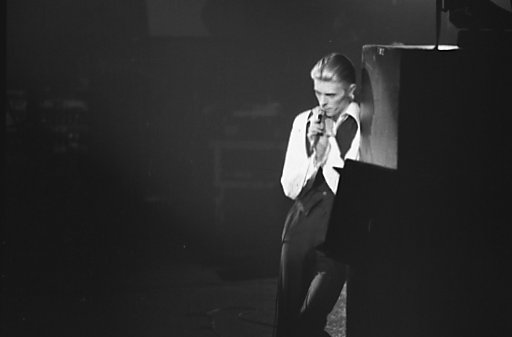
Bowie as the Thin White Duke at Maple Leaf Gardens, Toronto, 1976

The tour was highly successful but mired in political controversy. Bowie was quoted as saying that "Britain could benefit from a fascist leader", and was detained by customs on the Russian—Polish border for possessing Nazi paraphernalia. Matters came to a head in London in May in what became known as the "Victoria Station incident". Arriving in an open-top Mercedes convertible, Bowie waved to the crowd in a gesture that some alleged was a Nazi salute, which was captured on camera and published in NME. Bowie said the photographer caught him in mid-wave. He later blamed his pro-fascism comments and his behaviour during the period on his cocaine addiction, the character of the Thin White Duke and his life in Los Angeles, a city he later said "should be wiped off the face of the Earth". He later apologised for these statements, and throughout the 1980s and 1990s criticised racism in European politics and the American music industry. Nevertheless, his comments on fascism, as well as Eric Clapton's alcohol-fuelled denunciations of Pakistani immigrants in 1976, led to the establishment of Rock Against Racism.

=== 1976–1979: Berlin era ===
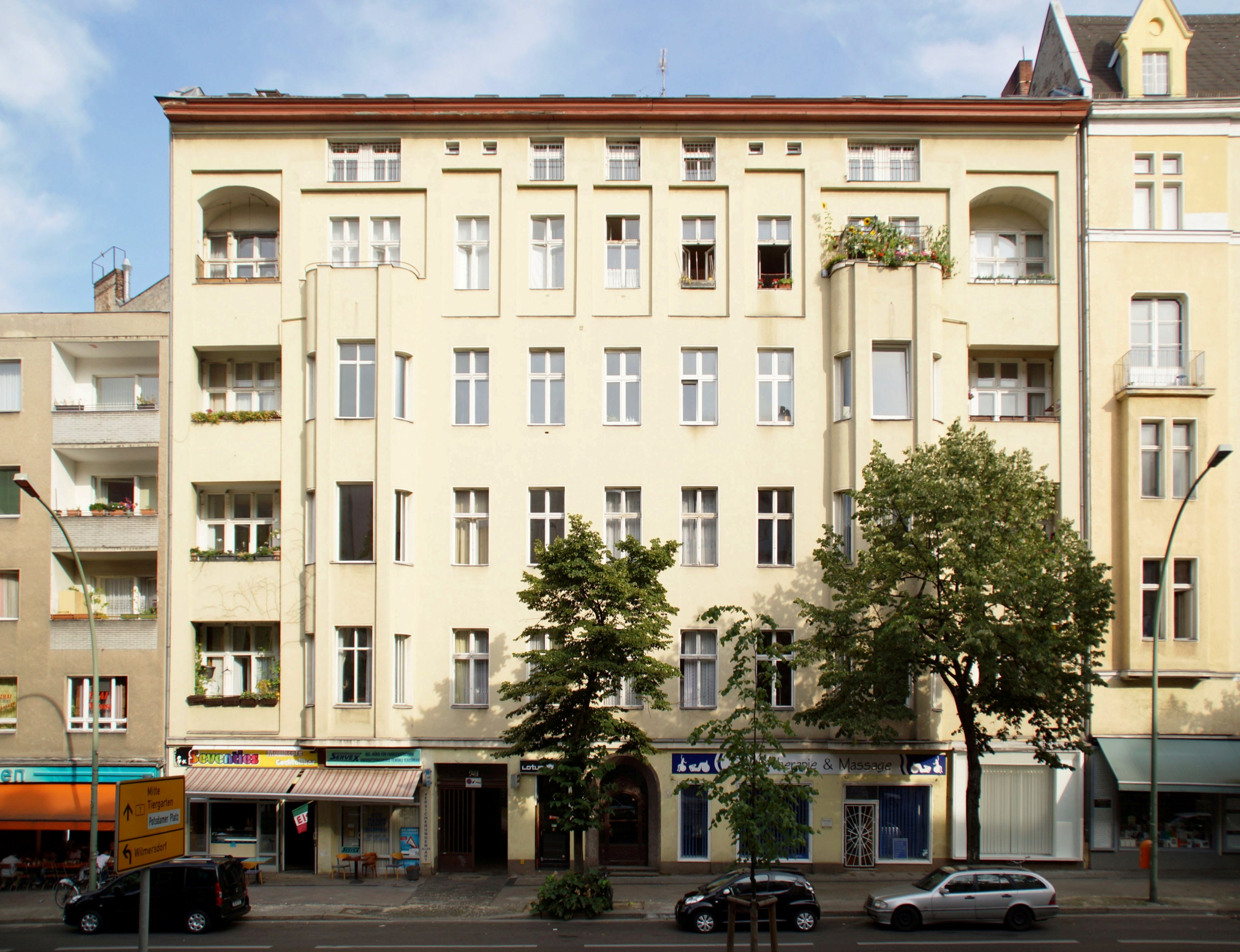
Apartment building at Hauptstraße 155, Schöneberg, Berlin, where Bowie lived from 1976 to 1978

In August 1976, Bowie and Iggy Pop moved to West Berlin to rid themselves of their drug addictions and escape the spotlight. Bowie's interest in German krautrock and the ambient works of multi-instrumentalist Brian Eno culminated in the first of three albums, co-produced with Visconti, that became known as the Berlin Trilogy. The album, Low (1977), was recorded in France and took influence from krautrock and experimental music, featuring short song-fragments and ambient instrumentals. Before its recording, Bowie produced Iggy Pop's debut solo album The Idiot, described by Pegg as "a stepping stone between Station to Station and Low". Low was completed in November, but left unreleased for three months. RCA did not see the album as commercially viable and was expecting another success following Young Americans and Station to Station. Upon its release in January 1977, Low yielded the UK number three single "Sound and Vision", and its own performance surpassed that of Station to Station in the UK chart, where it reached number two. Bowie did not promote it, instead touring with Pop as his keyboardist throughout March and April before recording Pop's follow-up, Lust for Life.

"'Heroes'"
Sample of "'Heroes'" (1977). One of the ambient rock songs to emerge from Bowie's Berlin Trilogy era, "'Heroes'" gained lasting popularity.

Echoing Low's minimalist, instrumental approach, "Heroes" (1977) incorporated pop and rock to a greater extent, seeing Bowie joined by guitarist Robert Fripp. It was the only album of the trilogy recorded entirely in Berlin. Incorporating ambient sounds from a variety of sources including white noise generators, synthesisers and koto, the album was another hit, reaching number three in the UK. Its title track was released in both German and French and, though only reaching number 24 in the UK singles chart, later became one of his best-known tracks. In contrast to Low, Bowie promoted "Heroes" extensively, performing the title track on Marc Bolan's television show Marc, and again two days later for Bing Crosby's final CBS television Christmas special, when he joined Crosby in "Peace on Earth/Little Drummer Boy", a version of "The Little Drummer Boy" with a new, contrapuntal verse. RCA belatedly released the recording as a single five years later in 1982, charting in the UK at number three.

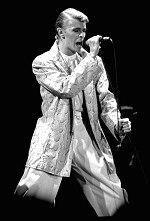
Bowie performing in Oslo, Norway, 1978

After completing Low and "Heroes", Bowie spent much of 1978 on the Isolar II world tour, bringing the music of the first two Berlin Trilogy albums to almost a million people during 70 concerts in 12 countries. By now he had broken his drug addiction; Buckley writes that Isolar II was "Bowie's first tour for five years in which he had probably not anaesthetised himself with copious quantities of cocaine before taking the stage. ... Without the oblivion that drugs had brought, he was now in a healthy enough mental condition to want to make friends." Recordings from the tour made up the live album Stage, released the same year. Bowie also recorded narration for an adaptation of Sergei Prokofiev's classical composition Peter and the Wolf, which was released as an album in May 1978.

The final piece in what Bowie called his "triptych", Lodger (1979) eschewed the minimalist, ambient nature of its two predecessors, making a partial return to the drum- and guitar-based rock and pop of his pre-Berlin era. The result was a complex mixture of new wave and world music, in places incorporating Hijaz non-Western scales. The album, recorded in Switzerland and New York City, reached number four in the UK and number 20 in the US, and yielded the UK hit singles "Boys Keep Swinging" and "D.J." Towards the end of the year, Bowie and Angie initiated divorce proceedings, and after months of court battles, the marriage was ended in early 1980. The three albums were later adapted into classical music symphonies by American composer Philip Glass for his first, fourth and twelfth symphonies in 1992, 1997 and 2019, respectively. Glass praised David Bowie's gift for creating "fairly complex pieces of music, masquerading as simple pieces".

=== 1980–1988: New Romantic and pop era ===
Scary Monsters (and Super Creeps) (1980) produced the number one single "Ashes to Ashes", featuring the textural guitar-synthesiser work of Chuck Hammer and revisiting the character of Major Tom from "Space Oddity". The song gave international exposure to the underground New Romantic movement when Bowie visited the London club "Blitz"—the main New Romantic hangout—to recruit several of the regulars (including Steve Strange of the band Visage) to act in the accompanying video, renowned as one of the most innovative of all time. While Scary Monsters used principles established by the Berlin albums, it was considered by critics to be far more direct musically and lyrically. The album's hard rock edge included conspicuous guitar contributions from Fripp and Pete Townshend. Topping the UK Albums Chart for the first time since Diamond Dogs, Buckley writes that with Scary Monsters, Bowie achieved "the perfect balance" of creativity and mainstream success.

Bowie paired with Queen in 1981 for a one-off single release, "Under Pressure". The duet was a hit, becoming Bowie's third UK number-one single. Bowie was given the lead role in the BBC's 1982 televised adaptation of Bertolt Brecht's play Baal. Coinciding with its transmission, a five-track EP of songs from the play was released as Baal. In March 1982, Bowie's title song for Paul Schrader's film Cat People was released as a single. A collaboration with Giorgio Moroder, it became a minor US hit and charted in the UK top 30. The same year, he departed RCA, having grown increasingly dissatisfied with them, and signed a new contract with EMI America Records for a reported $17 million. His 1975 severance settlement with Defries also ended in September.

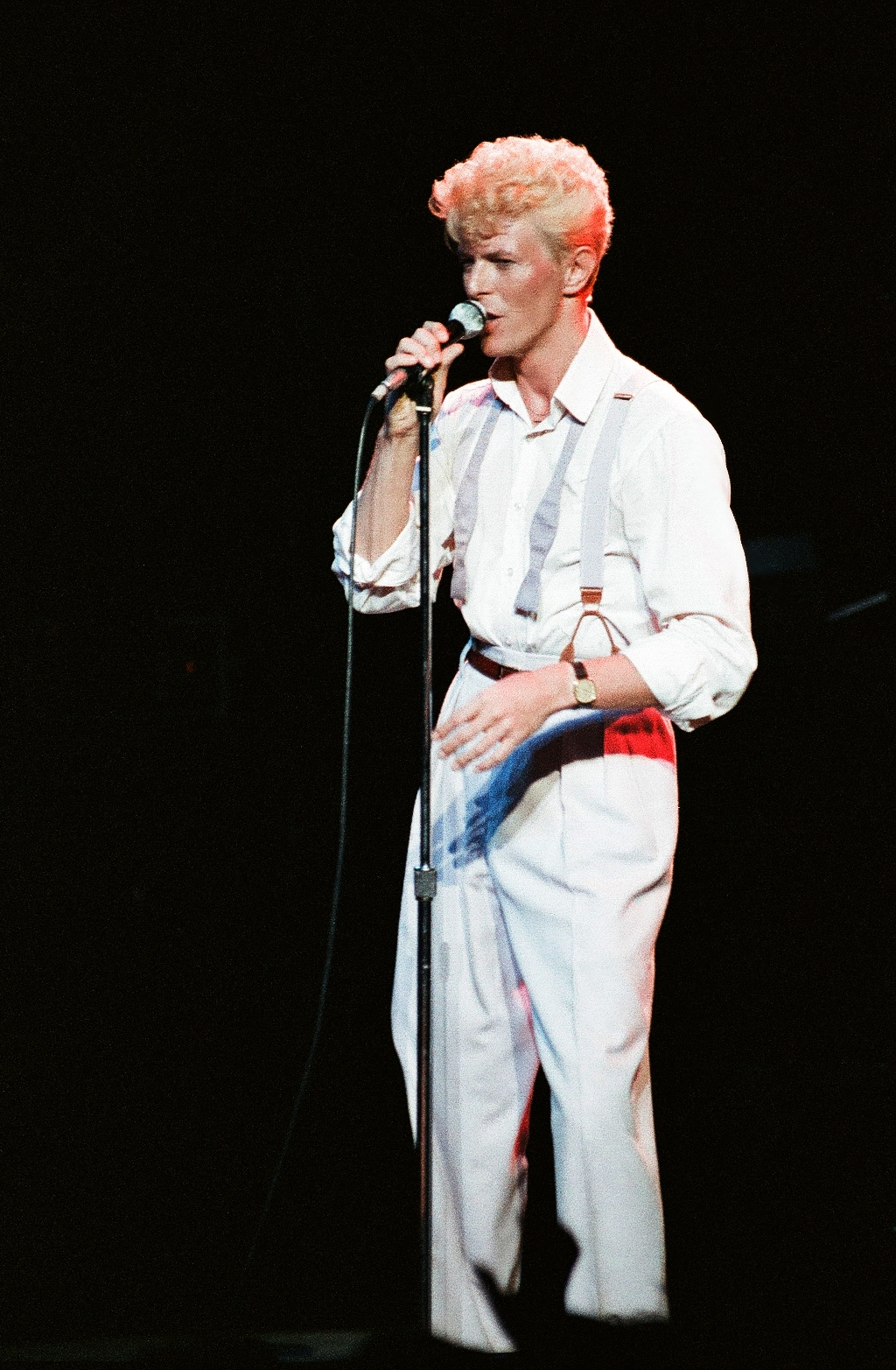
Serious Moonlight Tour, 1983

Bowie reached his peak of popularity and commercial success in 1983 with Let's Dance. Co-produced by Chic's Nile Rodgers, the album went platinum in both the UK and the US. Its three singles became top 20 hits in both countries, where its title track reached number one. "Modern Love" and "China Girl" each made number two in the UK, accompanied by a pair of "absorbing" music videos that Buckley said

activated key archetypes in the pop world ... 'Let's Dance', with its little narrative surrounding the young Aboriginal couple, targeted 'youth', and 'China Girl', with its bare-bummed (and later partially censored) beach lovemaking scene ... was sufficiently sexually provocative to guarantee heavy rotation on MTV.

Then-unknown Texas blues guitarist Stevie Ray Vaughan guested on the album, featuring prominently on the title track. Let's Dance was followed by the six-month Serious Moonlight Tour, which was extremely successful. At the 1984 MTV Video Music Awards, Bowie received two awards including the inaugural Video Vanguard Award.

Tonight (1984), another dance-oriented album, found Bowie collaborating with Pop and Tina Turner. Co-produced by Hugh Padgham, it included a number of cover songs, including three Pop covers and the 1966 Beach Boys hit "God Only Knows". The album bore the transatlantic top 10 hit "Blue Jean", itself the inspiration for the Julien Temple-directed short film Jazzin' for Blue Jean, in which Bowie played the dual roles of romantic protagonist Vic and arrogant rock star Screaming Lord Byron. The short won Bowie his only non-posthumous Grammy Award for Best Short Form Music Video. In early 1985, Bowie's collaboration with the Pat Metheny Group, "This Is Not America", for the soundtrack of The Falcon and the Snowman, was released as a single and became a top 40 hit in the UK and US. In July, Bowie performed at Wembley Stadium for Live Aid, a multi-venue benefit concert for Ethiopian famine relief. Bowie and Mick Jagger duetted on a cover of Martha and the Vandellas' "Dancing in the Street" as a fundraising single, which went to number one in the UK and number seven in the US; its video premiered during Live Aid.

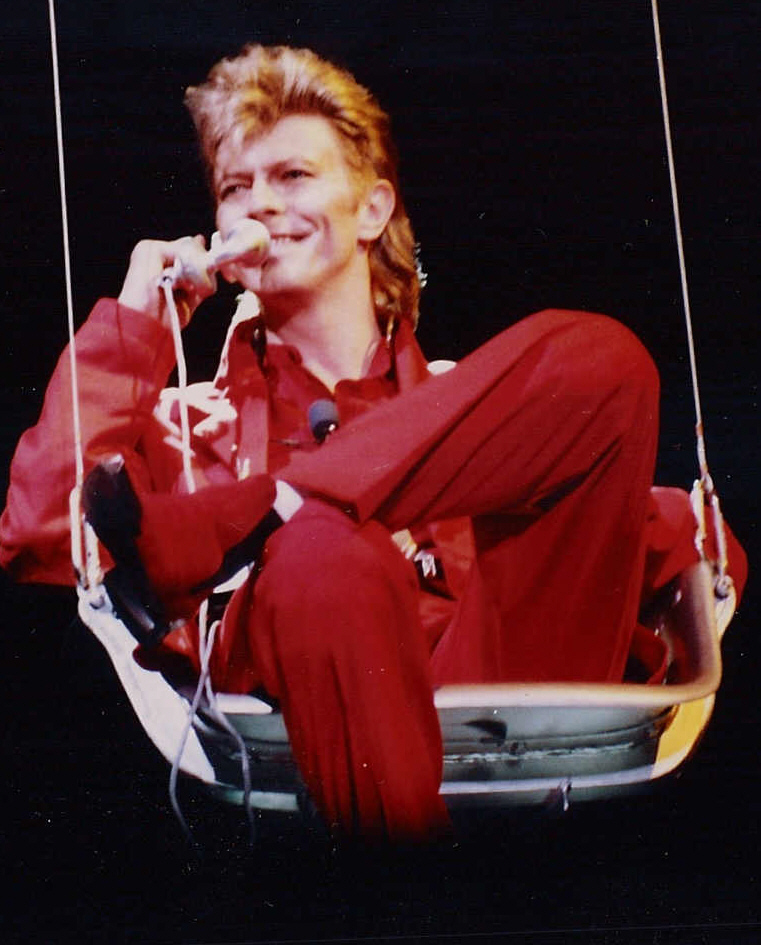
Bowie performing during the Glass Spider Tour, 1987

Bowie took an acting role in the 1986 film Absolute Beginners, and his title song rose to number two in the UK charts. He also worked with composer Trevor Jones and wrote five original songs for the 1986 film Labyrinth, which he starred in. His final solo album of the decade was 1987's Never Let Me Down, where he ditched the light sound of his previous two albums, instead combining pop rock with a harder rock sound. Peaking at number six in the UK, the album yielded the hits "Day-In Day-Out", "Time Will Crawl" and "Never Let Me Down". Bowie later described it as his "nadir", calling it "an awful album". He supported the album on the 86-concert Glass Spider Tour. The backing band included Peter Frampton on lead guitar. Contemporary critics maligned the tour as overproduced, saying it pandered to the current stadium rock trends in its special effects and dancing, although in later years critics acknowledged the tour's strengths and influence on concert tours by other artists, such as Prince, Madonna and U2.

=== 1989–1991: Tin Machine ===
Wanting to completely rejuvenate himself following the critical failures of Tonight and Never Let Me Down, Bowie placed his solo career on hold after meeting guitarist Reeves Gabrels and formed the hard rock quartet Tin Machine. The line-up was completed by bassist and drummer Tony and Hunt Sales, who had played with Bowie on Iggy Pop's Lust for Life in 1977. Although he intended Tin Machine to operate as a democracy, Bowie dominated, both in songwriting and in decision-making. The band's 1989 self-titled debut album received mixed reviews and, according to author Paul Trynka, was quickly dismissed as "pompous, dogmatic and dull". EMI complained of "lyrics that preach" as well as "repetitive tunes" and "minimalist or no production". It reached number three in the UK and was supported by a twelve-date tour.

The tour was a commercial success, but there was growing reluctance—among fans and critics alike—to accept Bowie's presentation as merely a band member. A series of Tin Machine singles failed to chart, and Bowie, after a disagreement with EMI, left the label. Like his audience and his critics, Bowie himself became increasingly disaffected with his role as just one member of a band. Tin Machine began work on a second album, but recording halted while Bowie conducted the seven-month Sound+Vision Tour, which brought him commercial success and acclaim.

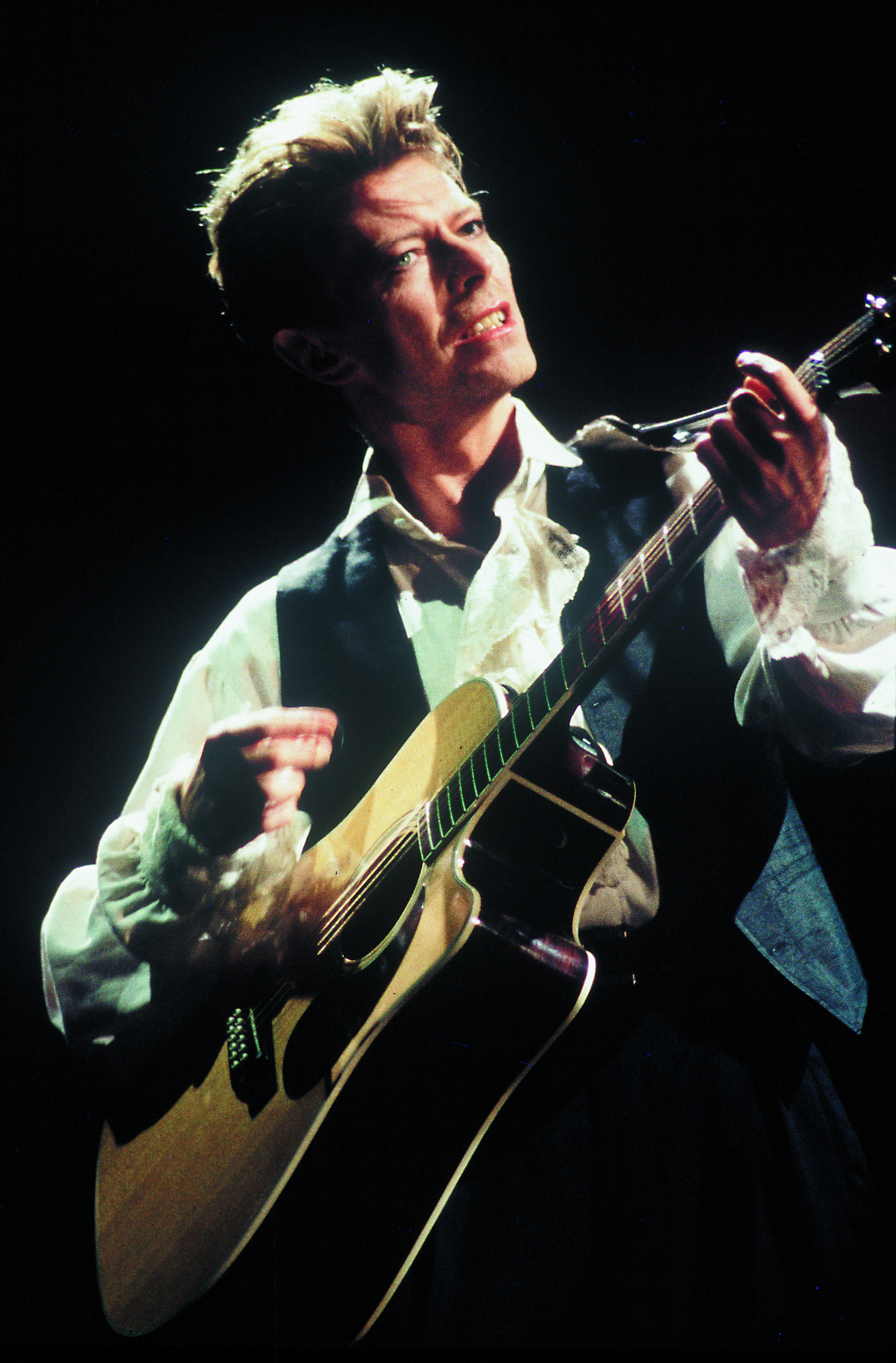
Bowie in Zagreb during the Sound+Vision Tour, 1990

In October 1990, Bowie and supermodel Iman were introduced by a mutual friend. He recalled, "I was naming the children the night we met ... it was absolutely immediate." They married in 1992. Tin Machine resumed work the same month, but their audience and critics, ultimately left disappointed by the first album, showed little interest in a second. Tin Machine II (1991) was Bowie's first album to miss the UK top 20 in nearly twenty years, and was controversial for its cover art. Depicting four ancient nude Kouroi statues, the new record label, Victory, deemed the cover "a show of wrong, obscene images" and airbrushed the statues' genitalia for the American release. Tin Machine toured again, but after the live album Tin Machine Live: Oy Vey, Baby (1992) failed commercially, Bowie dissolved the band and resumed his solo career. He continued to collaborate with Gabrels for the rest of the 1990s.

=== 1992–1998: Electronic period ===
On 20 April 1992, Bowie appeared at The Freddie Mercury Tribute Concert, following the Queen singer's death the previous year. As well as performing "'Heroes'" and "All the Young Dudes", he was joined on "Under Pressure" by Annie Lennox, who took Mercury's vocal part; during his appearance, Bowie knelt and recited the Lord's Prayer at Wembley Stadium. Four days later, Bowie and Iman married in Switzerland. Intending to move to Los Angeles, they flew in to search for a suitable property, but found themselves confined to their hotel: the 1992 Los Angeles riots began the day they arrived. They settled in New York instead.

In 1993, Bowie released his first solo offering since his Tin Machine departure, the soul, jazz and hip-hop influenced Black Tie White Noise. Making prominent use of electronic instruments, the album, which reunited Bowie with Let's Dance producer Nile Rodgers, confirmed Bowie's return to popularity, topping the UK chart and spawning three top 40 hits, including the top 10 single "Jump They Say". Bowie explored new directions on The Buddha of Suburbia (1993), which began as a soundtrack album for the BBC television adaptation of Hanif Kureishi's novel The Buddha of Suburbia before turning into a full album; only the title track "The Buddha of Suburbia" was used in the programme. Referencing his 1970s works with pop, jazz, ambient and experimental material, it received a low-key release, had almost no promotion and flopped commercially, reaching number 87 in the UK. Nevertheless, it later received critical praise as Bowie's "lost great album".

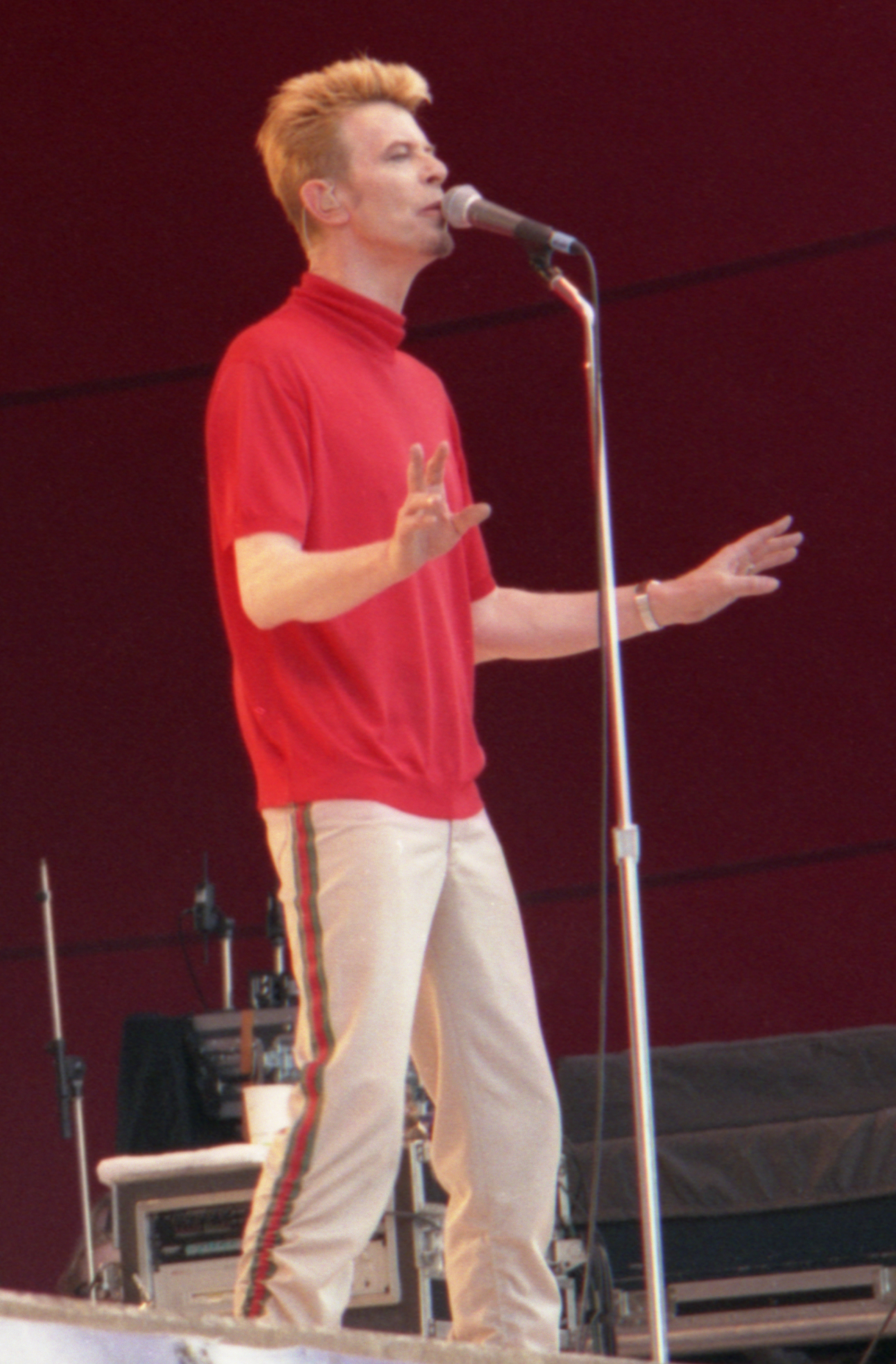
Bowie performing at the Ruisrock festival in Turku, Finland, 1997

Reuniting Bowie with Eno, the quasi-industrial Outside (1995) was originally conceived as the first volume in a non-linear narrative of art and murder. Featuring characters from a short story written by Bowie, the album achieved UK and US chart success and yielded three top 40 UK singles. In a move that provoked mixed reactions from both fans and critics, Bowie chose Nine Inch Nails as his tour partner for the Outside Tour. Visiting cities in Europe and North America between September 1995 and February 1996, the tour saw the return of Gabrels as Bowie's guitarist, and Gail Ann Dorsey as the new bassist.

It resumed in mid-1996 for a slimmed-down run through Japan, Russia and a string of European festivals, including Bowie's first performance in Israel, before concluding in October. During the Tel Aviv performance, Bowie said that he and his band were in the midst of "one of the best tours of his life".

On 7 January 1997, Bowie celebrated his half century with a 50th birthday concert at Madison Square Garden at which he was joined in playing his songs and those of his guests, Lou Reed, Dave Grohl and the Foo Fighters, Robert Smith of the Cure, Billy Corgan of the Smashing Pumpkins, Black Francis of the Pixies, and Sonic Youth.

Incorporating experiments in jungle and drum 'n' bass, Earthling (1997) was a critical and commercial success in the UK and the US, and two singles from the album—"Little Wonder" and "Dead Man Walking"—became UK top 40 hits. The song "I'm Afraid of Americans" from the Paul Verhoeven film Showgirls was re-recorded for the album, and remixed by Trent Reznor for a single release. The heavy rotation of the accompanying video, also featuring Reznor, contributed to the song's 16-week stay in the US Billboard Hot 100. Bowie received a star on the Hollywood Walk of Fame on 12 February 1997. The Earthling Tour took place in Europe and North America between June and November. In November, Bowie performed on the BBC's Children in Need charity single "Perfect Day", which reached number one in the UK. Bowie reunited with Visconti in 1998 to record "(Safe in This) Sky Life" for The Rugrats Movie. Although the track was edited out of the final cut, it was later re-recorded and released as "Safe" on the B-side of Bowie's 2002 single "Everyone Says 'Hi'". The reunion led to other collaborations with his old producer, including a limited-edition single release version of Placebo's track "Without You I'm Nothing" with Bowie's harmonised vocal added to the original recording.

=== 1999–2012: Neoclassicist era ===
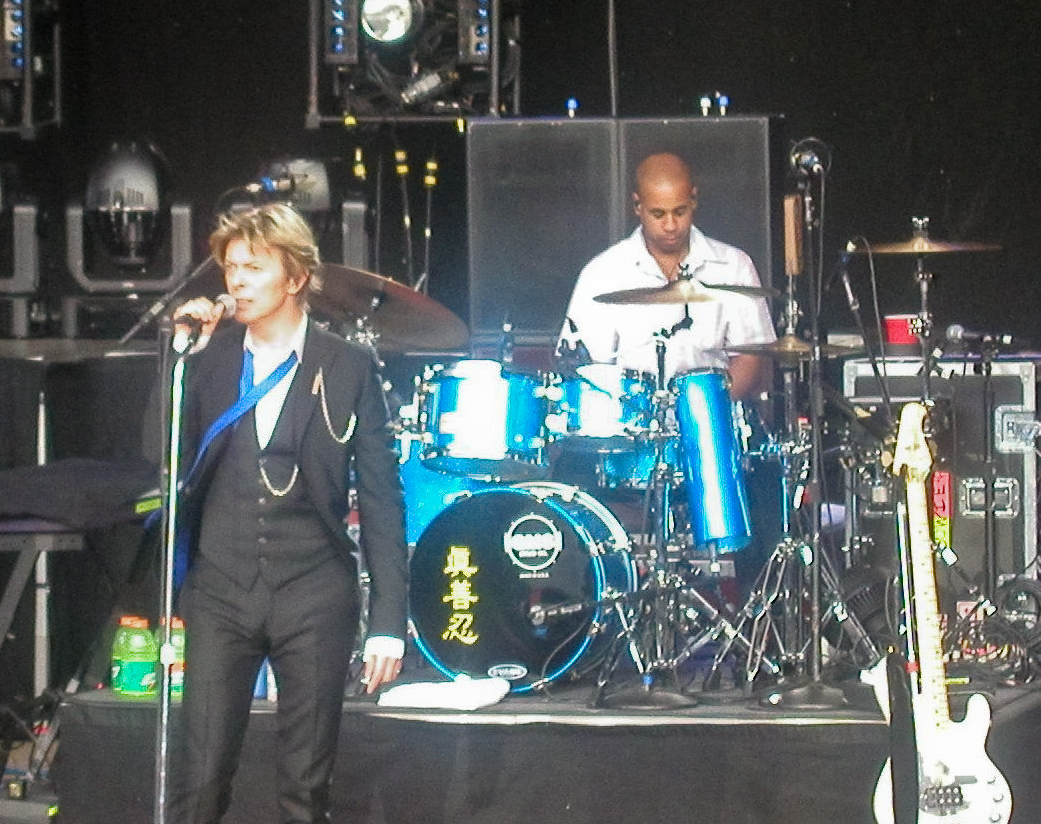
Bowie on stage with Sterling Campbell during the Heathen Tour, 2002

Bowie, with Gabrels, created the soundtrack for Omikron: The Nomad Soul, a 1999 computer game in which he and Iman also voiced characters based on their likenesses. Released the same year and containing re-recorded tracks from Omikron, his album Hours featured a song with lyrics by the winner of his "Cyber Song Contest" Internet competition, Alex Grant. Making extensive use of live instruments, the album was Bowie's exit from heavy electronica. Hours and a performance on VH1 Storytellers in mid-1999 represented the end of Gabrels' association with Bowie as a performer and songwriter. Sessions for Toy, a planned collection of remakes of tracks from Bowie's 1960s period, commenced in 2000, but was shelved due to EMI/Virgin's lack of faith in its commercial appeal. Bowie and Visconti continued their collaboration, producing a new album of completely original songs instead: the result was the 2002 album Heathen.

On 25 June 2000, Bowie made his second appearance at the Glastonbury Festival in England, playing almost 30 years after his first. (Note: He first played at Glastonbury in June 1971 shortly after the Hunky Dory sessions commenced. Performing alone, his set was warmly received.) The performance was released as a live album in November 2018. On 27 June, he performed a concert at the BBC Radio Theatre in London, which was released on the compilation album Bowie at the Beeb; this also featured BBC recording sessions from 1968 to 1972. His interest in Buddhism led him to support the Tibetan cause by performing at the February 2001 and February 2003 concerts to support Tibet House US at Carnegie Hall in New York.

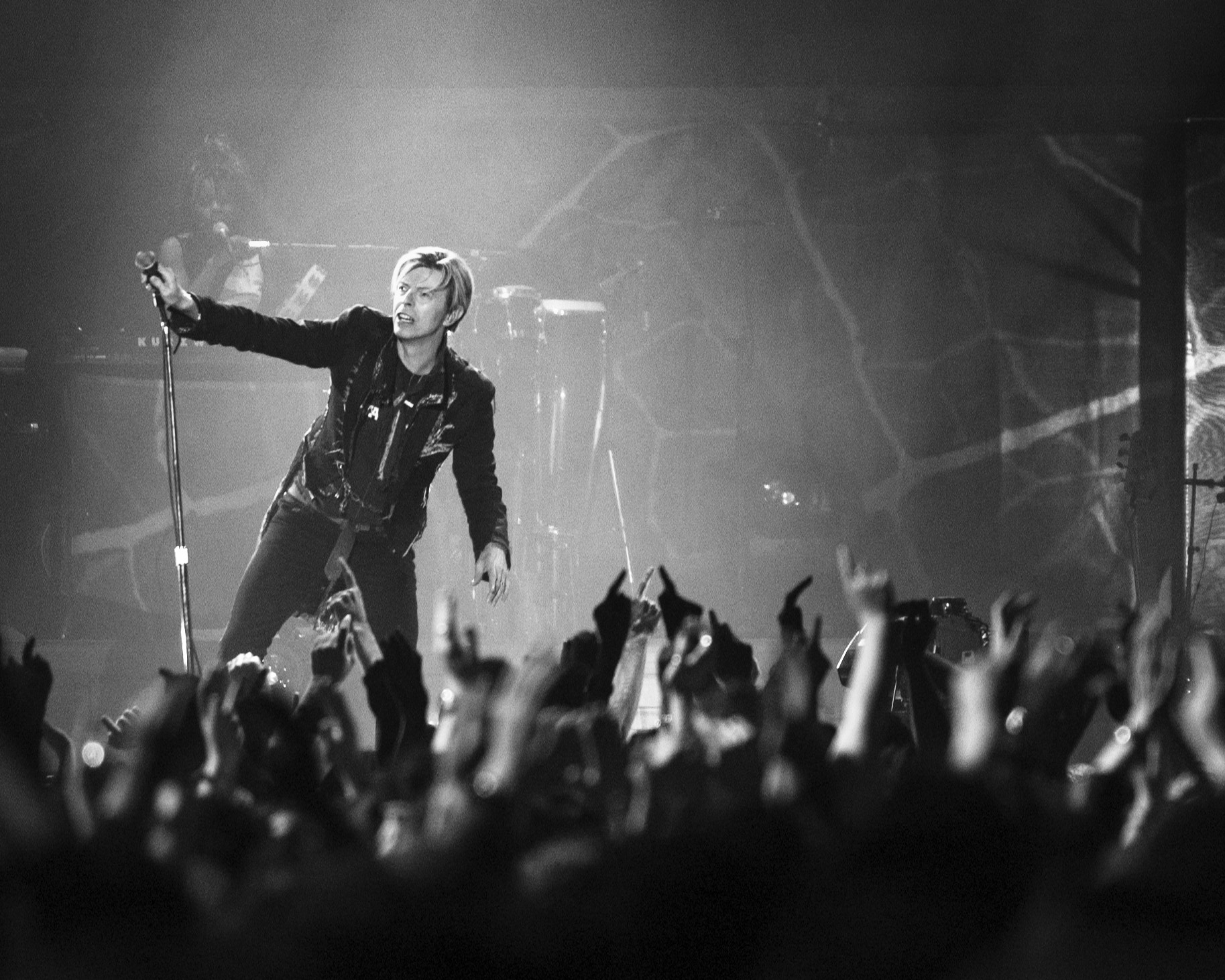
Bowie performing in Dublin, Ireland, in November 2003 during the A Reality Tour—his final concert tour

In October 2001, Bowie opened the Concert for New York City, a charity event to benefit the victims of the September 11 attacks, with a minimalist performance of Simon & Garfunkel's "America", followed by a full band performance of "'Heroes'". 2002 saw the release of Heathen, and, during the second half of the year, the Heathen Tour. Taking place in Europe and North America, the tour opened at London's annual Meltdown festival, for which Bowie was that year appointed artistic director. Among the acts he selected for the festival were Philip Glass, Television and the Dandy Warhols. As well as songs from the new album, the tour featured material from Bowie's Low era. Reality (2003) followed, and its accompanying world tour, the A Reality Tour, with an estimated attendance of 722,000, grossed more than any other in 2004. On 13 June, Bowie headlined the last night of the Isle of Wight Festival 2004. On 25 June, he experienced chest pain while performing at the Hurricane Festival in Scheeßel, Germany. Originally thought to be a pinched nerve in his shoulder, the pain was later diagnosed as an acutely blocked coronary artery, requiring an emergency angioplasty in Hamburg. The remaining fourteen dates of the tour were cancelled.

In the years following his recuperation from the heart attack, Bowie reduced his musical output, making only one-off appearances on stage and in the studio. He sang in a duet of his 1971 song "Changes" with Butterfly Boucher for the 2004 animated film Shrek 2. During a relatively quiet 2005, he recorded the vocals for the song "(She Can) Do That", co-written with Brian Transeau, for the film Stealth. He returned to the stage on 8 September 2005, appearing with Arcade Fire for the US nationally televised event Fashion Rocks, and performed with the Canadian band for the second time a week later during the CMJ Music Marathon. He contributed backing vocals on TV on the Radio's song "Province" for their album Return to Cookie Mountain, and joined with Lou Reed on Danish alt-rockers Kashmir's 2005 album No Balance Palace.

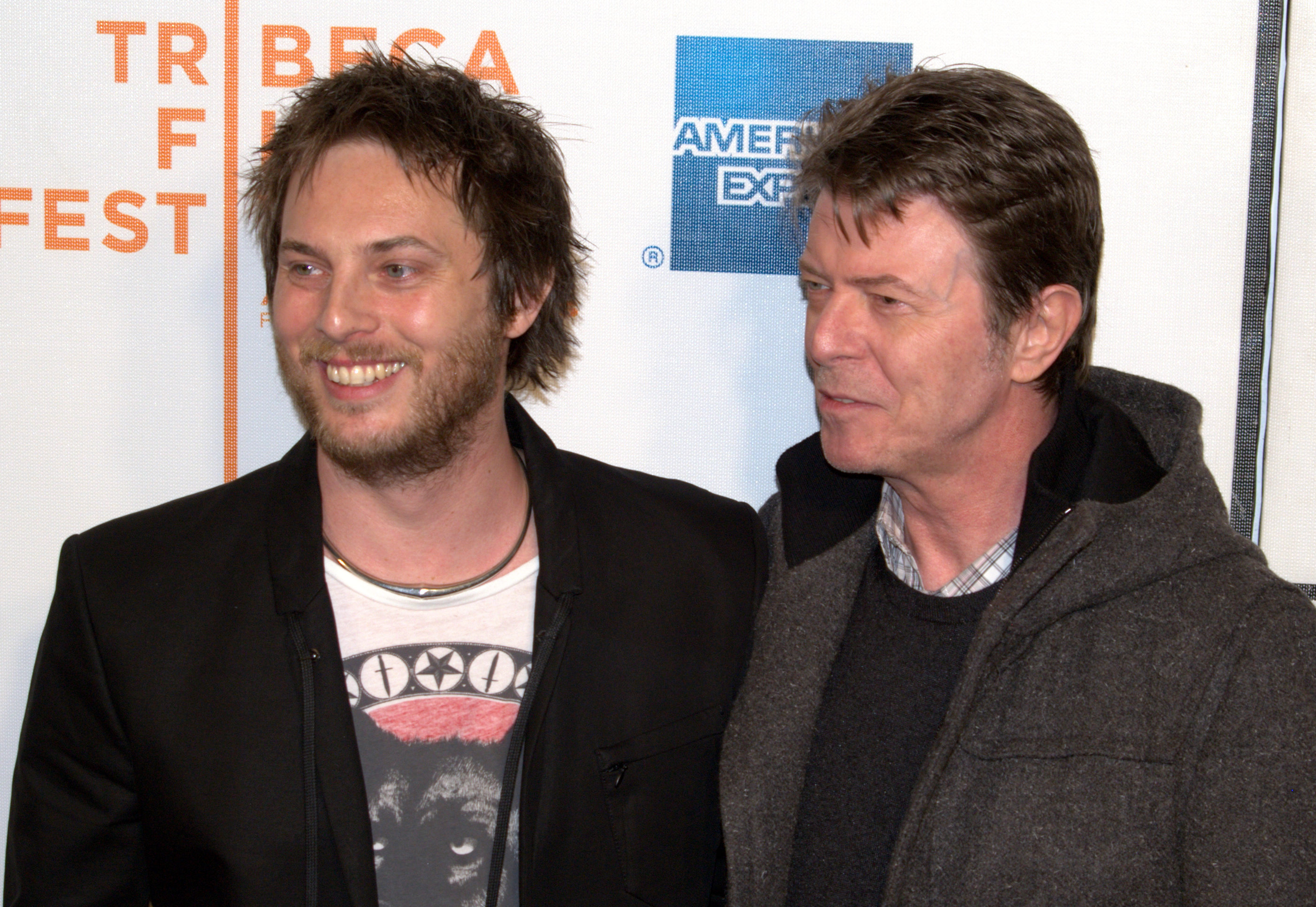
Bowie with his son Duncan Jones at the premiere of Jones's directorial debut Moon, 2009

Bowie was awarded the Grammy Lifetime Achievement Award on 8 February 2006. In April, he announced, "I'm taking a year off—no touring, no albums." He made a surprise guest appearance at David Gilmour's 29 May concert at the Royal Albert Hall in London. The event was recorded, and a selection of songs on which he had contributed joint vocals were subsequently released. He performed again in November, alongside Alicia Keys, at the Black Ball, a benefit event for Keep a Child Alive at the Hammerstein Ballroom in New York. The performance marked the last time Bowie performed his music on stage.

Bowie was chosen to curate the 2007 High Line Festival. The musicians and artists he selected for the Manhattan event included electronic pop duo AIR, surrealist photographer Claude Cahun and English comedian Ricky Gervais. Bowie performed on Scarlett Johansson's 2008 album of Tom Waits covers, Anywhere I Lay My Head. In June 2008, a live album was released of a Ziggy Stardust-era concert from 1972. On the 40th anniversary of the July 1969 Moon landing—and Bowie's accompanying commercial breakthrough with "Space Oddity"—EMI released the individual tracks from the original eight-track studio recording of the song, in a 2009 contest inviting members of the public to create a remix. A live album from the A Reality Tour was released in January 2010.

In late March 2011, Toy, Bowie's previously unreleased album from 2001, was leaked onto the internet, containing material used for Heathen and most of its single B-sides, as well as unheard new versions of his early back catalogue.

=== 2013–2016: Final years ===
On 8 January 2013, his 66th birthday, his website announced a new studio album—his first in a decade—to be titled The Next Day and scheduled for release in March; the announcement was accompanied by the immediate release of the single "Where Are We Now?". A music video for the single was released onto Vimeo the same day, directed by New York artist Tony Oursler. The single topped the UK iTunes Chart within hours, and debuted in the UK Singles Chart at number six, his first single to enter the Top 10 for two decades (since "Jump They Say" in 1993). A second single and video, "The Stars (Are Out Tonight)", were released at the end of February, starring Bowie and Tilda Swinton as a married couple.

Recorded in secret between 2011 and 2012, 29 songs were recorded during the album's sessions, of which 22 saw official release in 2013, including 14 on the standard album. Three bonus tracks were later packaged with seven outtakes and remixes on The Next Day Extra, released in November. Debuting at number one in the UK, The Next Day was his first album to top the chart since Black Tie White Noise, and was the fastest-selling album of 2013 at the time. The music video for the song "The Next Day" created some controversy due to its Christian themes and messages. Bowie ruled out ever giving an interview again. Later in 2013, he was featured in a cameo vocal in the Arcade Fire song "Reflektor". The success of The Next Day saw Bowie become the oldest ever recipient of a Brit Award when he won the award for British Male Solo Artist at the 2014 Brit Awards, which was collected on his behalf by Kate Moss.

In mid-2014, Bowie was diagnosed with liver cancer, which he kept private. A new compilation album, Nothing Has Changed, was released in November. The album featured rare tracks and old material from his catalogue in addition to a new song, "Sue (Or in a Season of Crime)". Bowie continued working throughout 2015, secretly recording his final album Blackstar in New York between January and May. In August, it was announced that he was writing songs for a Broadway musical based on the SpongeBob SquarePants cartoon series; the final production included a retooled version of "No Control" from Outside. September saw the release of the box set Five Years (1969–1973), the first in a series of retrospective releases compiling his albums from 1969 to 1973. He also wrote and recorded the opening title song to the television series The Last Panthers, which aired in November. The theme that was used for The Last Panthers was also the title track for Blackstar. On 7 December, Bowie's musical Lazarus debuted in New York; he made his final public appearance at its opening night.

Blackstar was released on 8 January 2016, Bowie's 69th birthday, and was met with critical acclaim. He died two days later, after which Visconti called the album a "parting gift" for his fans before his death. Several reporters and critics subsequently noted that most of the lyrics on the album seem to revolve around his impending death, with CNN noting that the album "reveals a man who appears to be grappling with his own mortality". Several critics have described Blackstar as a perfect farewell for Bowie's fans, and is regarded as one of the best final albums ever. Visconti also said that he had been planning a follow-up album, and had written and recorded demos of five songs in his final weeks, suggesting he believed he had a few months left. The day following his death, online viewing of Bowie's music skyrocketed, breaking the record for Vevo's most viewed artist in a single day. Blackstar debuted at number one on the UK Albums Chart; nineteen of his albums were in the UK Top 100 Albums Chart, and thirteen singles were in the UK Top 100 Singles Chart. Blackstar also debuted at number one on album charts around the world, including Australia, France, Germany, Italy, New Zealand and the US.

=== Posthumous releases ===
After his death, Newsweek reported that Bowie had left "a long list of unscheduled musical releases planned", divided into eras. Following Five Years (1969–1973), the second of these releases was Who Can I Be Now? (1974–1976) (2016), which was followed by A New Career in a New Town (1977–1982) in 2017, Loving the Alien (1983–1988) in 2018, Brilliant Adventure (1992–2001) in 2021, which saw the official release of the shelved album Toy, and I Can't Give Everything Away (2002–2016) in 2025. In 2017, Bowie's estate released the No Plan EP, which included "Lazarus" and three Blackstar outtakes, and a series of posthumous live albums: Cracked Actor (Live Los Angeles '74), Live Nassau Coliseum '76 and Welcome to the Blackout (Live London '78).

In 2020, a previously unreleased version of "The Man Who Sold the World" was released, followed by a streaming-only EP, Is It Any Wonder?, and ChangesNowBowie, an exclusive release for Record Store Day. Various live shows spanning his tours from 1995 to 1999 were released in late 2020 and early 2021 as part of the box set Brilliant Live Adventures. In September 2021, Bowie's estate signed a distribution deal with Warner Music Group, beginning in 2023, covering Bowie's recordings from 2000 through 2016. On 3 January 2022, Variety reported that Bowie's estate had sold his publishing catalogue to Warner Chappell Music, "for a price upwards of $250 million". In 2026, Bowie's unreleased 1965 recordings with Shel Talmy, sessions that featured Jimmy Page on guitar and Nicky Hopkins on piano, were released in a compilation album, The Shel Talmy Recordings, on 18 September.

== Acting career ==
In addition to music, Bowie took acting roles throughout his career, appearing in over 30 films, television shows and theatrical productions. His acting career was "productively selective", largely eschewing starring roles for cameos and supporting parts; he once described his film career as "splashing in the kids' pool". He mostly chose projects with arthouse directors that he felt were outside the Hollywood mainstream, commenting in 2000: "One cameo for Scorsese to me brings so much more satisfaction than, say, a James Bond." Critics have believed that, had he not chosen to pursue music, he could have found great success as an actor. Others have felt that, while his screen presence was singular, his best contributions to film were the use of his songs in films such as Lost Highway, A Knight's Tale, The Life Aquatic with Steve Zissou and Inglourious Basterds.

Bowie's acting career predated his commercial breakthrough as a musician. After appearing in several minor roles in the 1960s, his first major film role was in Nicolas Roeg's The Man Who Fell to Earth (1976), in which he portrayed the alien Thomas Jerome Newton. Bowie's severe cocaine addiction at the time left him in such a fragile state of mind that he barely understood the film. Nevertheless, he received critical praise for his performance. It is generally regarded as one of his most significant roles. In 1978, Bowie starred in David Hemmings's Just a Gigolo, alongside Marlene Dietrich. The film was a critical and commercial failure, and Bowie expressed disappointment in the finished product.

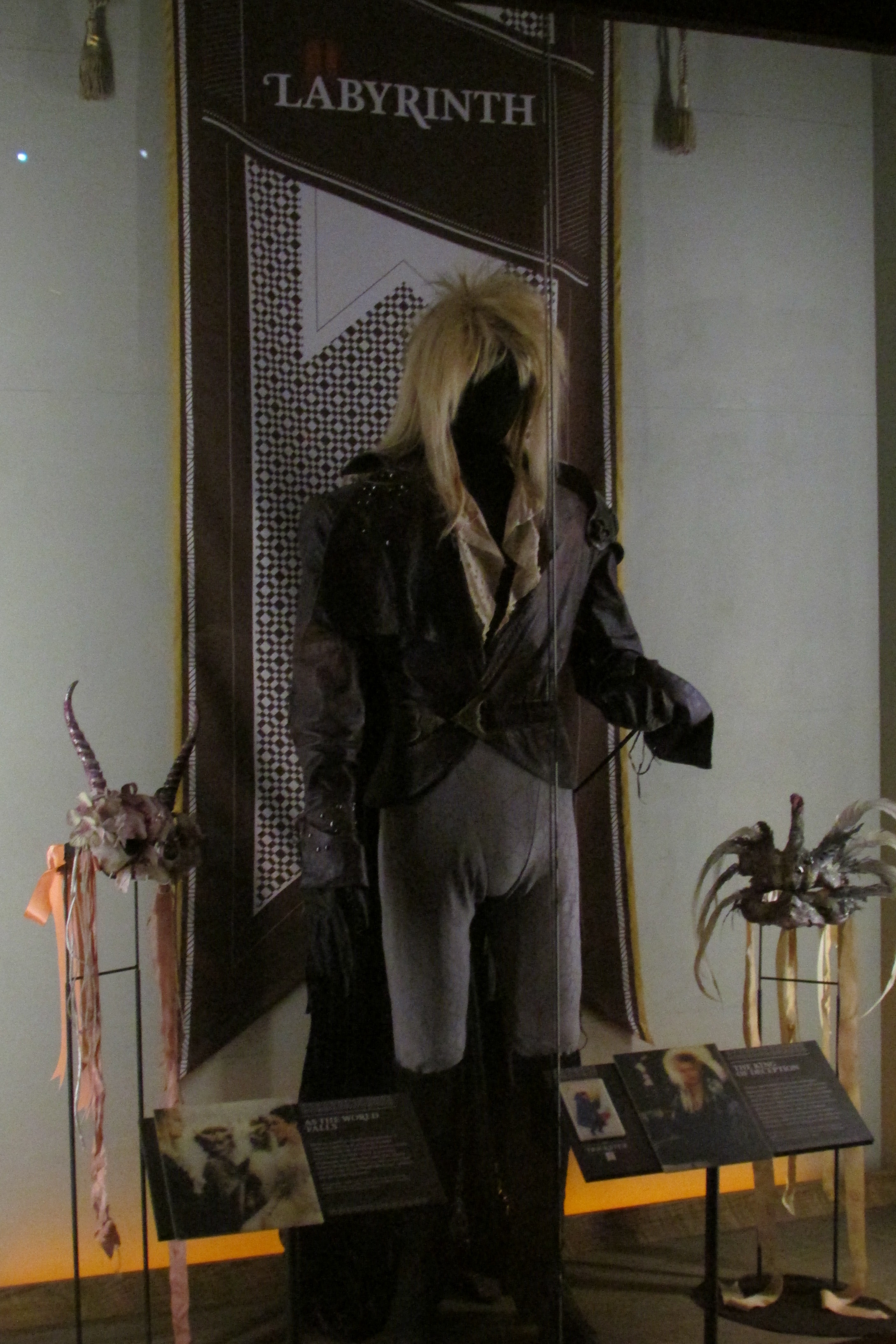
Bowie's costume from Labyrinth at the Museum of Pop Culture, Seattle

Bowie was prolific on stage and screen in the 1980s. From July 1980 to January 1981, he played Joseph Merrick in the Broadway theatre production The Elephant Man, which he undertook wearing no stage make-up, earning critical praise for his performance. In 1982, he starred in the titular role in a BBC adaptation of the Bertolt Brecht play Baal. In 1983, he starred as a vampire in Tony Scott's erotic horror film The Hunger and as a prisoner of war in a Japanese internment camp in Nagisa Ōshima's Merry Christmas, Mr. Lawrence, the latter role earning him critical praise. In 1986, he appeared in Julien Temple's rock musical Absolute Beginners and in Jim Henson's dark musical fantasy Labyrinth as Jareth, the villainous Goblin King. Despite initially performing poorly, the film grew in popularity and became a cult film. In 1988, he received praise for his brief role as Pontius Pilate in Martin Scorsese's biblical epic The Last Temptation of Christ.

Bowie continued acting throughout the 1990s and 2000s. In 1991, he appeared in an episode of the HBO sitcom Dream On and in Richard Shepard's The Linguini Incident. The following year, he portrayed the mysterious FBI agent Phillip Jeffries in David Lynch's Twin Peaks: Fire Walk with Me (1992). Following more film roles, including as his friend Andy Warhol in Julian Schnabel's Basquiat (1996), he voiced two characters in the Dreamcast game Omikron: The Nomad Soul (1999), his only appearance in a video game. In the 2000s, he made cameo appearances as himself in Ben Stiller's comedy Zoolander (2001), Eric Idle's mockumentary The Rutles 2: Can't Buy Me Lunch (2002) and Todd Graff's teen comedy Bandslam (2009). In 2006, Bowie portrayed a fictionalised version of the inventor Nikola Tesla in Christopher Nolan's The Prestige. Nolan later claimed that Bowie was his only preference to play Tesla, and that he personally appealed to Bowie to take the role after he initially passed.

== Other works ==
=== Painter and art collector ===
Bowie was a painter and artist. He moved to Switzerland in 1976, purchasing a chalet in the hills north of Lake Geneva. In the new environment, his cocaine use decreased, and he devoted more time to his painting, producing a number of post-modernist pieces. When on tour, he took to sketching in a notebook, and photographing scenes for later reference. Visiting galleries in Geneva and the Brücke Museum in Berlin, Bowie became, in the words of Sandford, "a prolific producer and collector of contemporary art. ... Not only did he become a well-known patron of expressionist art: locked in Clos des Mésanges he began an intensive self-improvement course in classical music and literature, and started work on an autobiography."

One of Bowie's paintings sold at auction in late 1990 for $500, and the cover for his 1995 album Outside is a close-up of a self-portrait he painted that year. His first solo show, titled New Afro/Pagan and Work: 1975–1995, was in 1995 at The Gallery in Cork Street, London. In 1997, he founded the publishing company 21 Publishing. A year later, Bowie was invited to join the editorial board of the journal Modern Painters, and participated in the Nat Tate art hoax later that year. The same year, during an interview with Michael Kimmelman for The New York Times, he said "Art was, seriously, the only thing I'd ever wanted to own." Subsequently, in a 1999 interview for the BBC, he said "The only thing I buy obsessively and addictively is art". His art collection, which included works by Damien Hirst, Derek Boshier, Frank Auerbach, Henry Moore, and Jean-Michel Basquiat among others, was valued at over £10 million in mid-2016. After his death, his family decided to sell most of the collection because they "didn't have the space" to store it.

=== Writings ===
Outside of music, Bowie dabbled in several forms of writings during his life. In the late 1990s, he was commissioned for writings of various media, including an essay on Jean-Michel Basquiat for the 2001 anthology book Writers on Artists and forewords to Jo Levin's 2001 publication GQ Cool, Mick Rock's 2001 photography portfolio Blood and Glitter, his wife Iman's 2001 book I Am Iman, Q magazine's 2002 special The 100 Greatest Rock 'n' Roll Photographs and Jonathan Barnbrook's artwork portfolio Barnbrook Bible: The Graphic Design of Jonathan Barnbrook. He also heavily contributed to the 2002 Genesis Publications memoir of the Ziggy Stardust years, Moonage Daydream, which was rereleased in 2022.

Bowie wrote liner notes for several albums, including Too Many Fish in the Sea by Robin Clark, the wife of his guitarist Carlos Alomar, Stevie Ray Vaughan's posthumous Live at Montreux 1982 & 1985 (2002), the Spinners' compilation The Chrome Collection (2003), the tenth anniversary reissue of Placebo's debut album (2006) and Neu!'s Vinyl Box (2010). He also wrote an appreciation piece in Rolling Stone for Nine Inch Nails in 2005 and an essay for the booklet accompanying Iggy Pop's A Million in Prizes: The Anthology the same year.

=== Bowie Bonds ===
"Bowie Bonds", the first modern example of celebrity bonds, were asset-backed securities of current and future revenues of the 25 albums that Bowie recorded before 1990. Issued in 1997, the bonds were bought for US$55 million by the Prudential Insurance Company of America. At that time, Bowie founded the Jones/Tintoretto Entertainment Company (named for Italian painter Tintoretto, whose mid-16th century work Angel Foretelling the Martyrdom of Saint Catherine of Alexandria was a prized possession of Bowie's) as official owner of his music catalogue, to act as the party entering the bonds transaction. Royalties from the 25 albums generated the cash flow that secured the bonds' interest payments. By forfeiting 10 years of royalties, Bowie received a payment of US$55 million up front. Bowie used this income to buy songs owned by Defries. The bonds liquidated in 2007 and the rights to the income from the songs reverted to Bowie.

=== Websites ===
Bowie launched two personal websites during his lifetime. The first, an Internet service provider titled BowieNet, was developed in conjunction with Robert Goodale and Ron Roy and launched in September 1998. Subscribers to the dial-up service were offered exclusive content as well as a BowieNet email address and Internet access. The service was closed by 2006. The second, www.bowieart.com, allowed fans to purchase selected paintings, prints and sculptures from his private collection. The service, which ran from 2000 to 2008, also offered a showcase for young art students, in Bowie's words, "to show and sell their work without having to go through a dealer. Therefore, they really make the money they deserve for their paintings."

Bowie is regarded by the BBC as an internet pioneer. With BowieNet, Bowie was one of the first major artists to engage with his audience through the Internet. His 1996 single "Telling Lies" was one of the first singles released for download, while his 1999 album Hours was the first album available for download through the Internet. Bowie stated in a December 1998 press release: "I wanted to create an environment where not just my fans, but all music fans could be part of a single community where vast archives of music and information could be accessed, views stated and ideas exchanged." The website predated social media. Billboard's Marc Hogan said that BowieNet "showed prescience about the interactive, back-and-forth nature of fandom in the Internet era".

=== Philanthropy ===
Bowie was involved in philanthropic efforts for HIV/AIDS research in Africa, as well as other humanitarian projects helping disadvantaged children and developing nations, ending poverty and hunger, promoting human rights, and providing education and health care to children affected by war. A portion of the proceeds from the pay-per-view showing of Bowie's 50th birthday concert in 1997 was donated to Save the Children.

== Musicianship ==
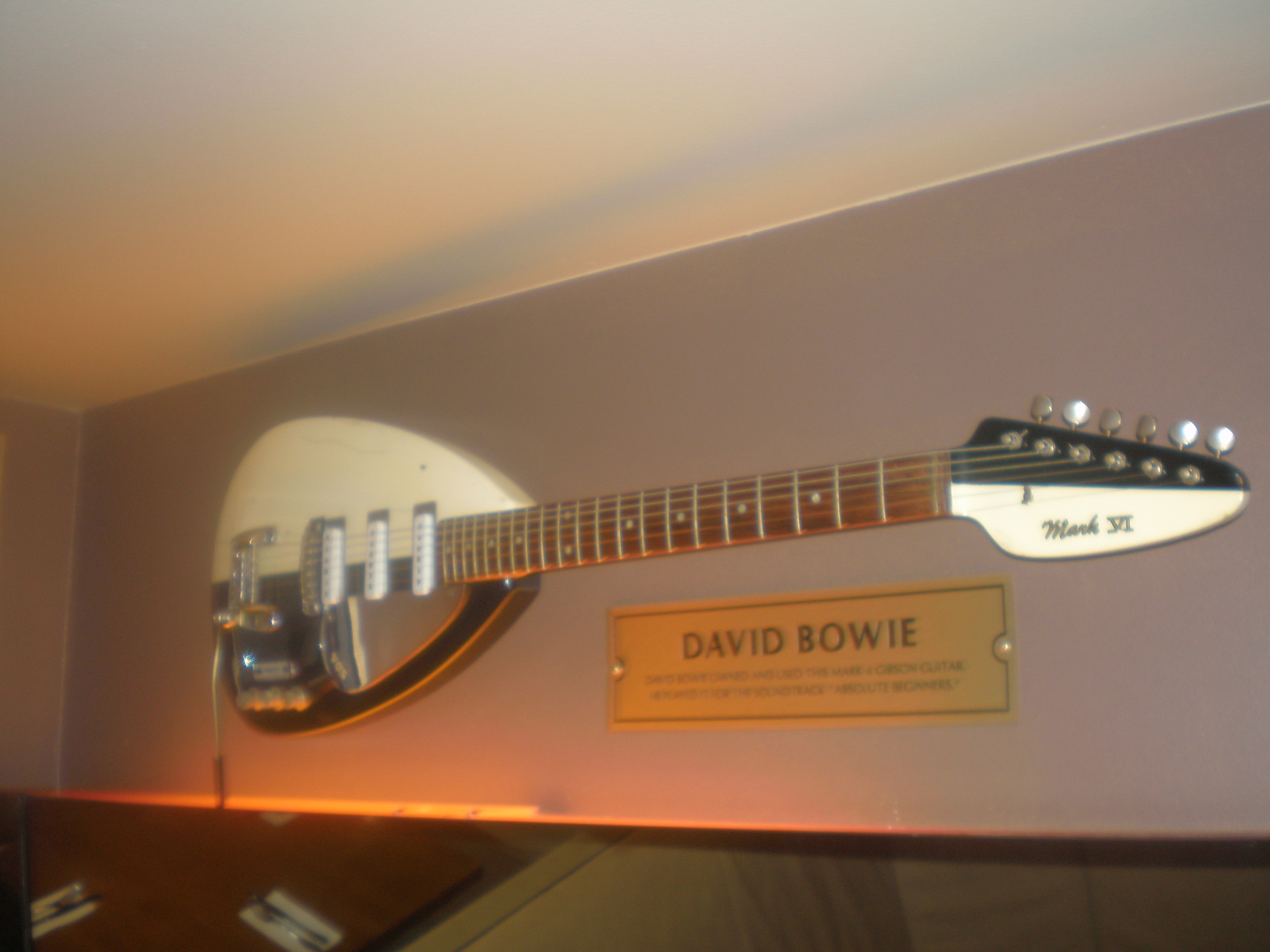
Bowie's Vox Mark VI guitar in the Hard Rock Cafe, Warsaw, Poland

From the time of his earliest recordings in the 1960s, Bowie employed a wide variety of musical styles. His early compositions and performances were strongly influenced by rock and roll singers like Little Richard and Elvis Presley, and also the wider world of show business. He particularly strove to emulate the British musical theatre singer-songwriter and actor Anthony Newley, whose vocal style he frequently adopted, and made prominent use of for his 1967 debut release, David Bowie (to the disgust of Newley himself, who destroyed the copy he received from Bowie's publisher). Bowie's fascination with music hall continued to surface sporadically alongside such diverse styles as hard rock and heavy metal, soul, psychedelic folk and pop.

The musicologist James E. Perone observes Bowie's use of octave switches for different repetitions of the same melody, exemplified in "Space Oddity", and later in "'Heroes'" to dramatic effect; the author writes that "in the lowest part of his vocal register ... his voice has an almost crooner-like richness". The voice instructor Jo Thompson describes Bowie's vocal vibrato technique as "particularly deliberate and distinctive". The authors Scott Schinder and Andy Schwartz call him "a vocalist of extraordinary technical ability, able to pitch his singing to particular effect." Here, too, as in his stagecraft and songwriting, Bowie's roleplaying is evident: the historiographer Michael Campbell says that Bowie's lyrics "arrest our ear, without question. But Bowie continually shifts from person to person as he delivers them ... His voice changes dramatically from section to section."

Bowie's primary instrument was guitar, but he also played a variety of keyboards, including piano, Mellotron, Chamberlin, and synthesisers; harmonica; alto and baritone saxophones; stylophone; viola; cello; koto; thumb piano; drums; and various percussion instruments. According to several of his guitarists, his guitar playing was not the best, but that did not diminish his songwriting quality.

== Personal life ==
=== Relationships ===
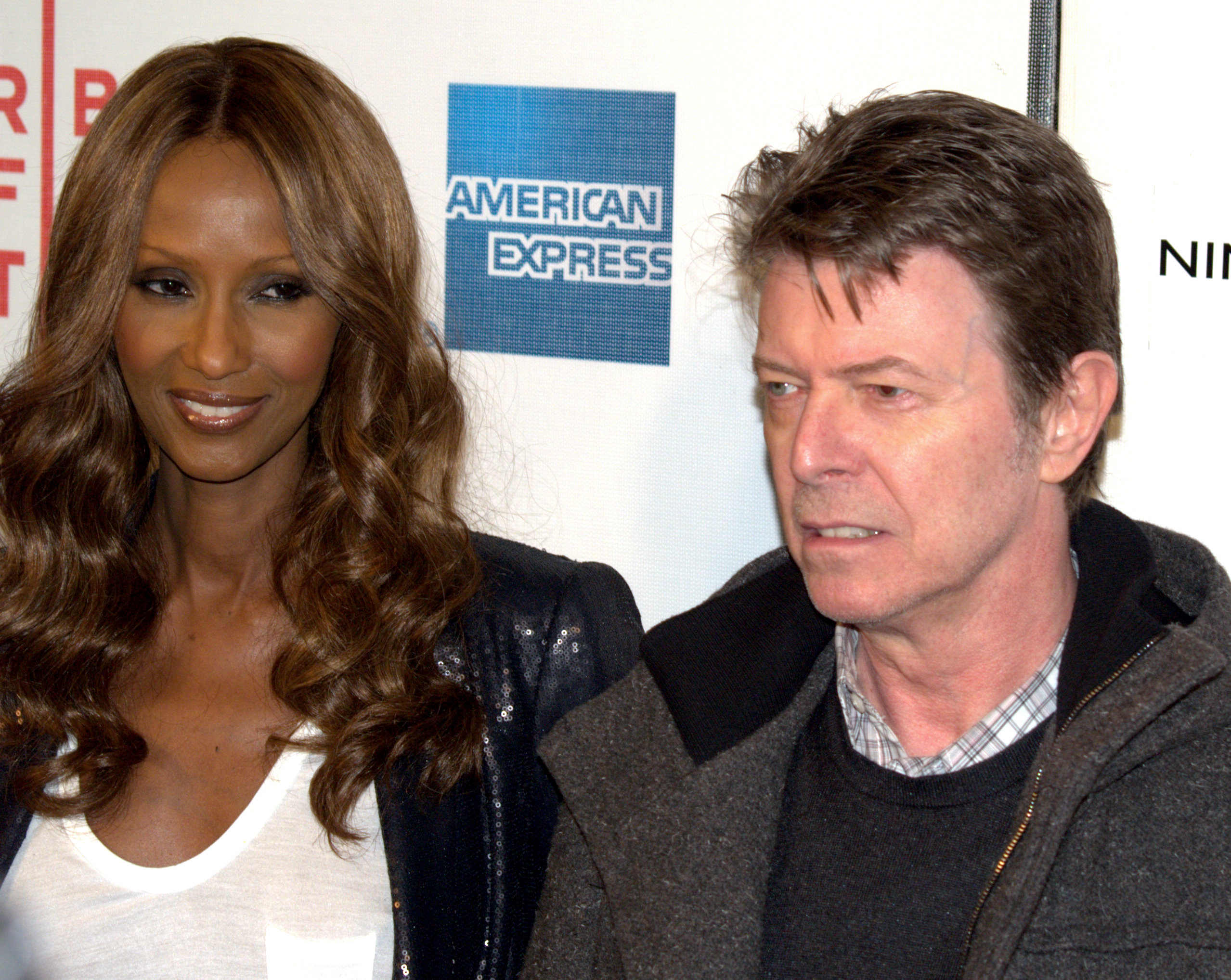
Bowie and his second wife Iman at the 2009 Tribeca Film Festival

In the 1960s, Bowie had relationships with the singer Dana Gillespie and dancer Hermione Farthingale. He dedicated songs to both of them. Bowie married his first wife, Mary Angela Barnett, on 19 March 1970 in Bromley, London. Their son Duncan, born on 30 May 1971, was at first known as Zowie. Angie later described her and David's union as a marriage of convenience. "We got married so that I could [get a permit to] work. I didn't think it would last and David said, before we got married, 'I'm not really in love with you' and I thought that's probably a good thing," she said. Bowie said about Angie that "living with her is like living with a blow torch". David and Angie had an open marriage and dated other people during it. The couple divorced on 8 February 1980.

Throughout the 1980s, Bowie had several relationships, including an engagement to his Glass Spider Tour dancer Melissa Hurley. He met Somali-American model Iman in October 1990, marrying in a private ceremony in Lausanne on 24 April 1992. They had one daughter, Alexandria "Lexi" Zahra Jones, born on 15 August 2000. The couple resided primarily in New York City and London and owned an apartment in Sydney's Elizabeth Bay and Britannia Bay House on the island of Mustique. Following Bowie's death, Iman expressed gratitude that the two were able to maintain separate identities during their marriage.

Corinne "Coco" Schwab was Bowie's personal assistant for 43 years, from 1973 until his death in 2016. Bowie referred to her as his best friend and credited her for saving his life in the 1970s by helping him quit his drug addiction.

=== Sexuality ===
Bowie's sexuality has been the subject of debate. He famously declared himself gay in a 1972 interview with Melody Maker journalist Michael Watts, which generated publicity in both Britain and America. He affirmed his stance in a 1976 interview, stating: "It's true—I am a bisexual. But I can't deny that I've used that fact very well. I suppose it's the best thing that ever happened to me." His claim of bisexuality has been supported by Angie. Nevertheless, Bowie told Rolling Stone writer Kurt Loder in 1983 that his public declaration of bisexuality was "the biggest mistake I ever made".

=== Spirituality and religion ===
Beginning in 1967 from the influence of his half-brother, Bowie became interested in Buddhism and, with commercial success eluding him, he considered becoming a Buddhist monk. After a few months' study at Tibet House in London, he was told by his Lama, Chime Rinpoche, "You don't want to be Buddhist. ... You should follow music." By 1975, Bowie admitted, "I felt totally, absolutely alone. And I probably was alone because I pretty much had abandoned God." In 1987, he denied following any particular religion or religious philosophy.

In 1993, Bowie said he had an "undying" belief in the "unquestionable" existence of God. The same year, while describing the genesis of the music for his album Black Tie White Noise, he said "it was important for me to find something [musically] that also had no sort of representation of institutionalized and organized religion, of which I'm not a believer, I must make that clear." Interviewed in 2005, Bowie said whether God exists "is not a question that can be answered. ... I'm not quite an atheist and it worries me. There's that little bit that holds on: 'Well, I'm almost an atheist. Give me a couple of months. ... I've nearly got it right.'" Nevertheless, in the same interview Bowie stated that "questioning [his] spiritual life [was] always ... germane" to his songwriting.

=== Political views ===
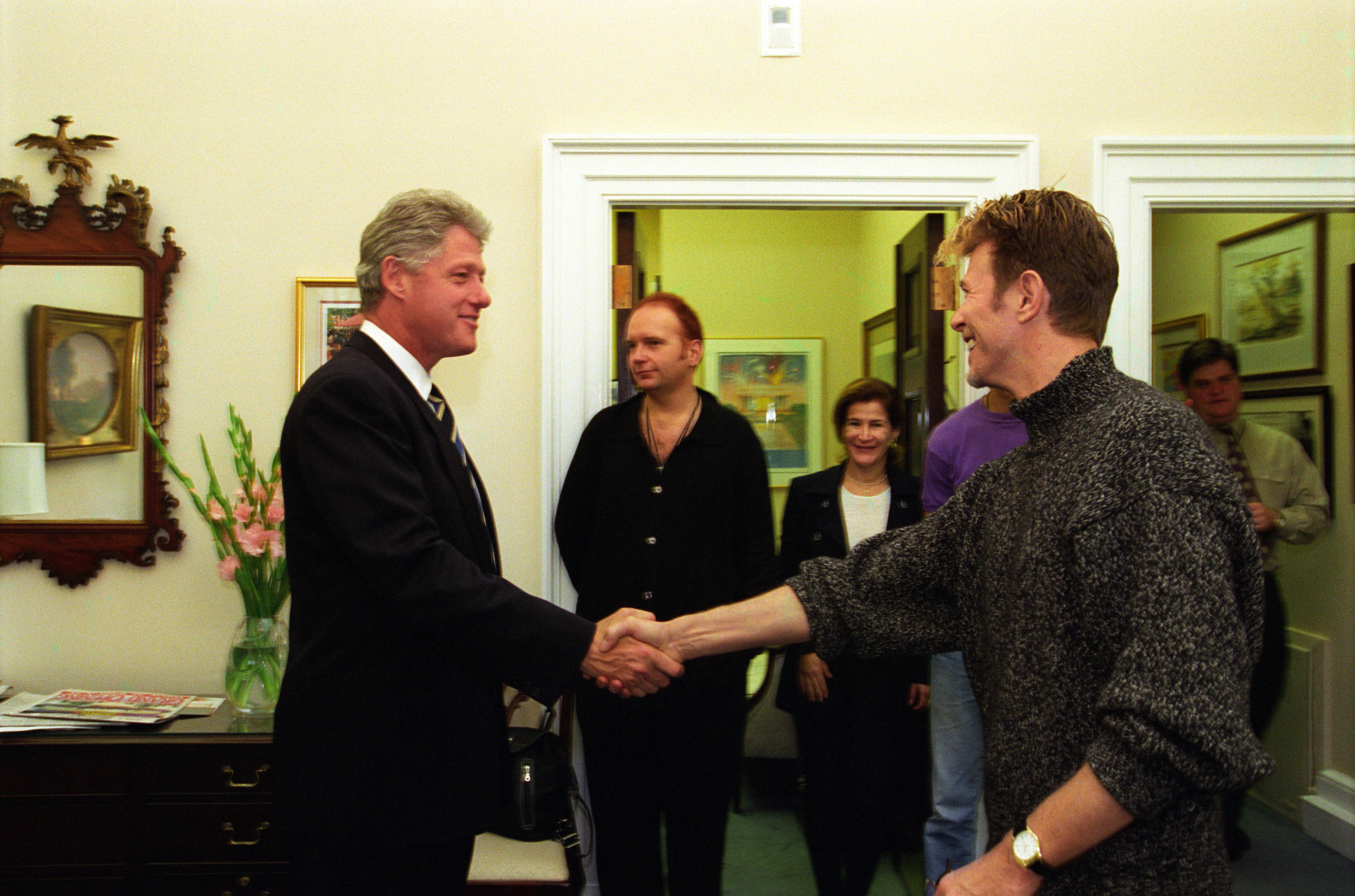
Bowie shaking hands with president Bill Clinton in October 1995.

In several 1976 interviews, speaking as the Thin White Duke persona, he made statements that supported fascism and perceived admiration for Adolf Hitler. He was also quoted as saying: "Adolf Hitler was one of the first rock stars" and "You've got to have an extreme right front come up and sweep everything off its feet and tidy everything up." These comments, along with Eric Clapton's comments in support of Enoch Powell at that time, have been named as an inspiration for the formation of the Rock Against Racism movement. Bowie retracted his comments in an interview with Melody Maker in October 1977, blaming them on mental instability caused by his drug problems. In the same interview, Bowie described himself as "apolitical".

In the 1980s and 1990s, Bowie's public statements shifted sharply towards anti-racism and anti-fascism, notably in the music videos for "China Girl" and "Let's Dance", and the album Tin Machine. In an interview with MTV anchor Mark Goodman in 1983, Bowie criticised the channel for not providing enough coverage of Black musicians, becoming visibly uncomfortable when Goodman suggested that the network's fear of backlash from the American Midwest was one reason for such a lack of coverage.

== Death ==
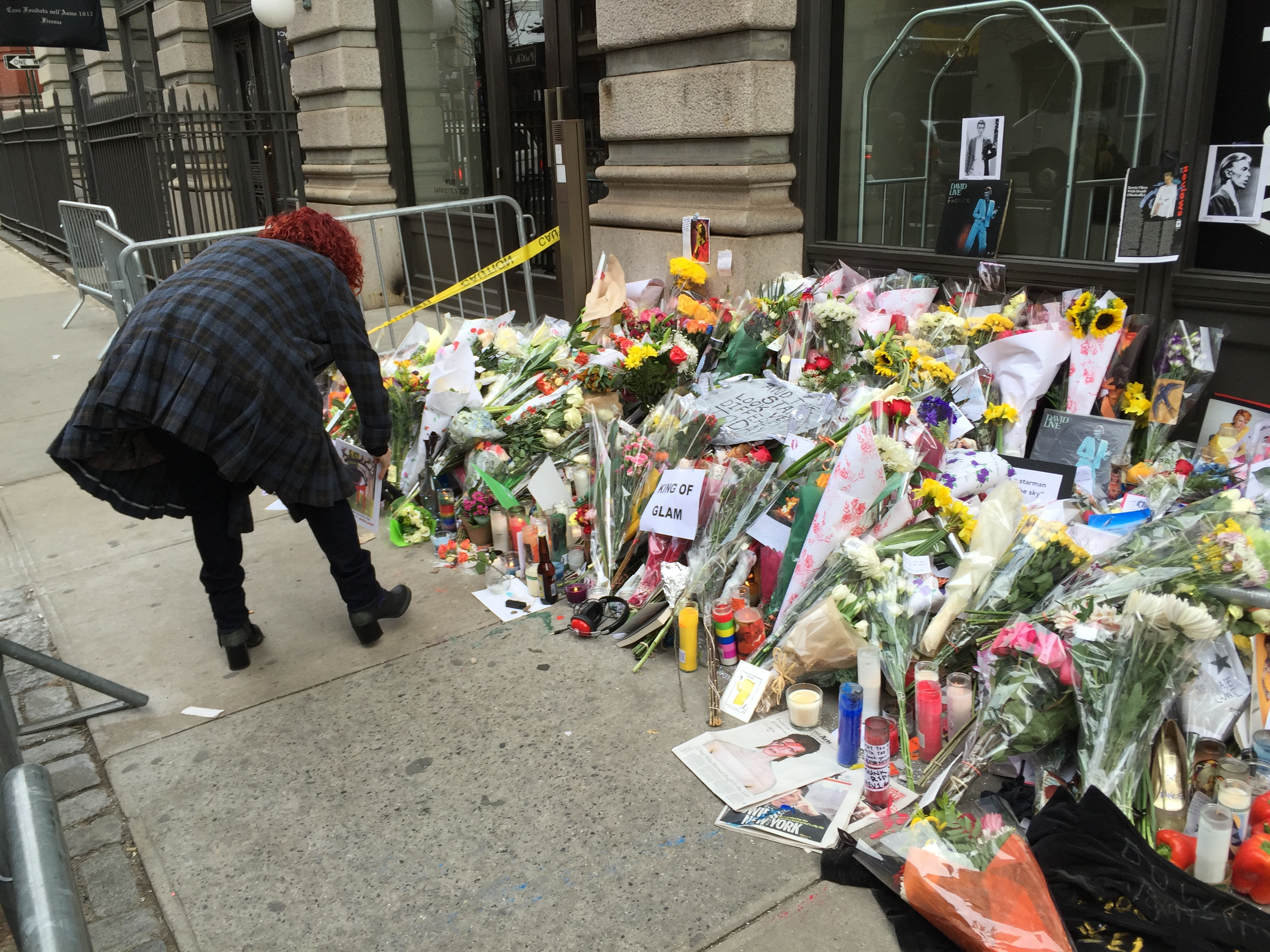
A woman places flowers outside Bowie's apartment in New York on Lafayette Street the day after his death was announced.

Bowie died of liver cancer in his New York City apartment on 10 January 2016. He had been diagnosed 18 months earlier, but he had not made his condition public.

Tony Visconti wrote:

He always did what he wanted to do. And he wanted to do it his way and he wanted to do it the best way. His death was no different from his life – a work of art. He made Blackstar for us, his parting gift. I knew for a year this was the way it would be. I wasn't, however, prepared for it. He was an extraordinary man, full of love and life. He will always be with us. For now, it is appropriate to cry.

Following Bowie's death, fans gathered at impromptu street shrines. At the mural of Bowie in his birthplace of Brixton, south London, fans laid flowers and sang his songs. Other memorial sites included Berlin, Los Angeles, and outside his apartment in New York. After his death, sales of his albums and singles soared. Bowie had insisted that he did not want a funeral, and according to his death certificate he was cremated. As he wished in his will, his ashes were scattered in a Buddhist ceremony in Bali.

== Legacy ==
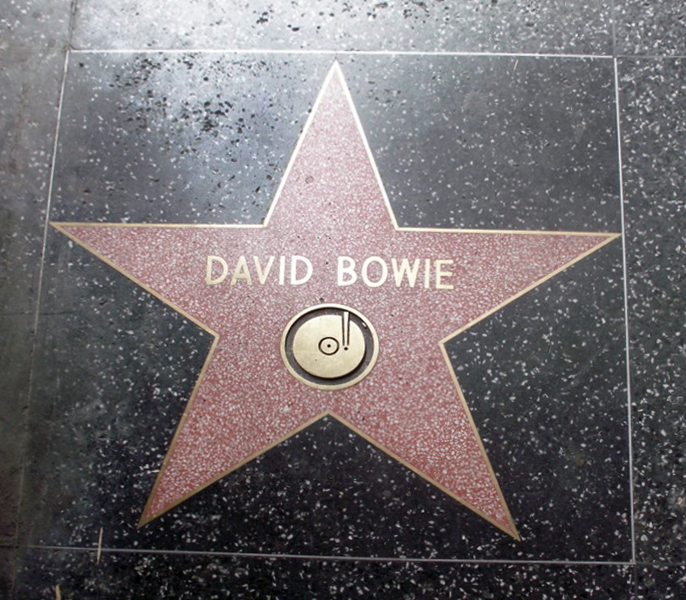
Bowie's star on the Hollywood Walk of Fame

Bowie is generally regarded as one of the most influential musicians ever. According to Alexis Petridis of The Guardian, by 1980 he was "the most important and influential artist since the Beatles". His influence was wide-reaching due to constant reinvention, leading him to be dubbed the "chameleon of rock". Billboard's Joe Lynch argued Bowie "influenced more musical genres than any other rock star", from glam rock, folk rock and hard rock, to electronic, industrial rock and synth-pop, to even hip-hop and indie rock. In The New York Times, Jon Pareles said Bowie "transcended music, art and fashion", and introduced his audiences to Philadelphia funk, Japanese fashion, German electronica and drum-and-bass dance music. The biographer Thomas Forget said in 2002: "Because he succeeded in so many different styles of music, it is almost impossible to find a popular artist today that has not been influenced by David Bowie." Neil McCormick of The Daily Telegraph stated that Bowie had "one of the supreme careers in popular music, art and culture of the 20th century" and "he was too inventive, too mercurial, too strange for all but his most devoted fans to keep up with".

Bowie's songs and stagecraft brought a new dimension to popular music in the early 1970s. Perone credited Bowie with having "brought sophistication to rock music", and critical reviews frequently acknowledged the intellectual depth of his work and influence. The BBC's arts editor Will Gompertz likened Bowie to Pablo Picasso, writing that he was "an innovative, visionary, restless artist who synthesised complex avant garde concepts into beautifully coherent works that touched the hearts and minds of millions". Schinder and Schwartz credited Bowie and Marc Bolan as the founders of the glam rock genre. He also inspired the punk rock movement and explored grunge and alternative rock with the band Tin Machine before those styles became popular.

Broadcaster John Peel contrasted Bowie with his progressive rock contemporaries, arguing that he was "an interesting kind of fringe figure ... on the outskirts of things". He said he "liked the idea of him reinventing himself ... Before Bowie came along, people didn't want too much change"; then Bowie "subverted the whole notion of what it was to be a rock star". Buckley called Bowie "both star and icon. [His] vast body of work ... has created perhaps the biggest cult in popular culture. ... His influence has been unique in popular culture—he has permeated and altered more lives than any comparable figure."

The BBC's Mark Easton argued that Bowie provided fuel for "the creative powerhouse that Britain has become" by challenging future generations "to aim high, to be ambitious and provocative, to take risks", concluding that he had "changed the way the world sees Britain. And the way Britain sees itself". In 2006, Bowie was voted the fourth greatest living British icon in a poll held by the BBC's Culture Show. Annie Zaleski wrote, "Every band or solo artist who's decided to rip up their playbook and start again owes a debt to Bowie".

Outside of music, Bowie is regarded as an influential figure in the fashion industry. His musical reinventions came with reinventions in fashion choices. He once told the journalist Dylan Jones: "Fashion is something I have always been fascinated with. But I've never felt the need to be fashionable myself. I enjoyed it when I was young, and of course, I used fashion when it was necessary in my work, but I have never considered myself to be a fashionable person." Bowie's early fashion choices explored androgyny, and throughout his career, he collaborated with numerous designers, including Kansai Yamamoto in 1972–1973, Willy Brown in 1979 and Alexander McQueen in 1997. According to The Guardian's Jess Cartner-Morley, Bowie "made art out of his clothes, his poses [and] his makeup." Bowie has been cited as an influence by fashion designers such as Raf Simons, Hedi Slimane, Jean Paul Gaultier and Dries van Noten.

Although Bowie's sexuality was debated, he is regarded as an influential figure in the LGBTQ community. The Canadian singer-songwriter Rae Spoon said that Bowie's personas in the 1970s "defied the ideas of binaries in gender, because you couldn't say he was masculine or feminine". Through his androgynous characters such as Ziggy Stardust, Bowie inspired many young people to confront their sexualities during periods when being gay or queer felt alienating. Writing for The Independent, Maya Oppenheim wrote that Bowie's "sexual ambiguity helped others gain the impetus to express themselves".

=== Exhibitions ===
An exhibition of Bowie artefacts, called David Bowie Is, debuted at the Victoria and Albert Museum in 2013. It was visited by more than 300,000 people, making it one of the most successful exhibitions ever staged at the museum. Later that year, the exhibition began a world tour that started in Toronto and included stops throughout Europe, Asia and North America before the exhibit ended in 2018 at the Brooklyn Museum. The exhibition hosted around 2 million visitors during its run.

On 13 September 2025, the David Bowie Centre opened at the V&A East Storehouse in Stratford, London. The centre hosts rotating exhibitions and houses Bowie's archive.

=== Films ===
On 7 January 2017, the BBC broadcast the documentary David Bowie: The Last Five Years. The biopic Stardust was announced on 31 January 2019, with Johnny Flynn as Bowie. Written by Christopher Bell and directed by Gabriel Range, the film follows Bowie on his first trip to the US in 1971. Bowie's son Duncan Jones spoke out against the film, saying he was not consulted and that the film would not have permission to use Bowie's music. The film was set to premiere at the 2020 Tribeca Film Festival, but the festival was postponed due to the COVID-19 pandemic. It received generally unfavourable reviews from critics.

A film based on Bowie's musical journey throughout his career was announced on 23 May 2022. Titled Moonage Daydream, after the song "Moonage Daydream", the film is written and directed by Brett Morgen and features never-before-seen footage, performances and music framed by Bowie's own narration. The documentary is the first posthumous film about Bowie to be approved by his estate. After five years in production, the film premiered at the 2022 Cannes Film Festival, and was released theatrically in the US. It received positive reviews. On 3 January 2026, the BBC broadcast the documentary Bowie: The Final Act, which covers Bowie's career from his commercial peak in 1983 to his death.

== Awards and achievements ==
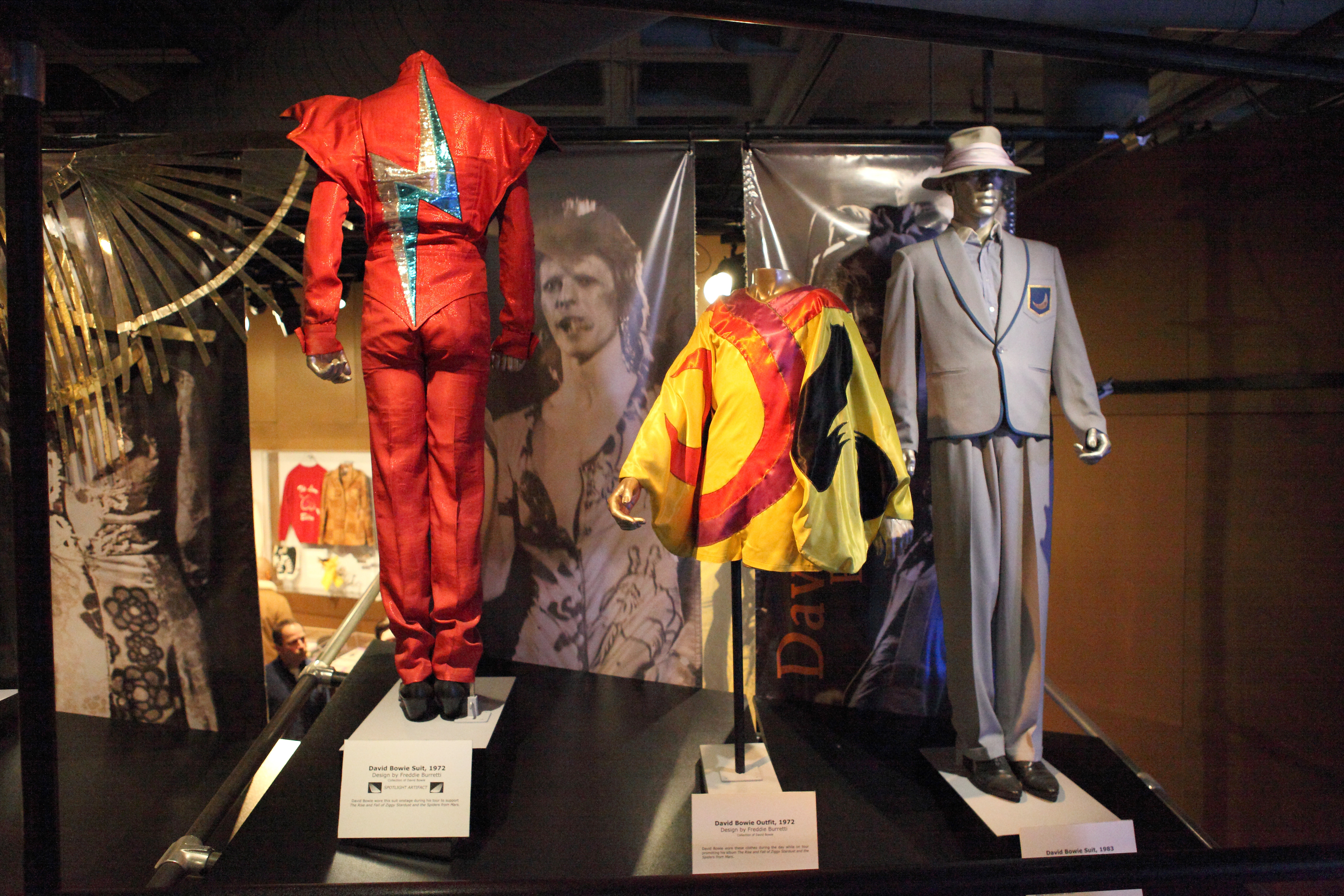
Variety of Bowie's outfits on display at the Rock and Roll Hall of Fame

Bowie's 1969 commercial breakthrough, "Space Oddity", won him an Ivor Novello Special Award For Originality. For his performance in The Man Who Fell to Earth, he won the Saturn Award for Best Actor. In the ensuing decades he received six Grammy Awards and four Brit Awards, including Best British Male Artist twice; the award for Outstanding Contribution to Music in 1996; and the Brits Icon award for his "lasting impact on British culture", given posthumously in 2016.

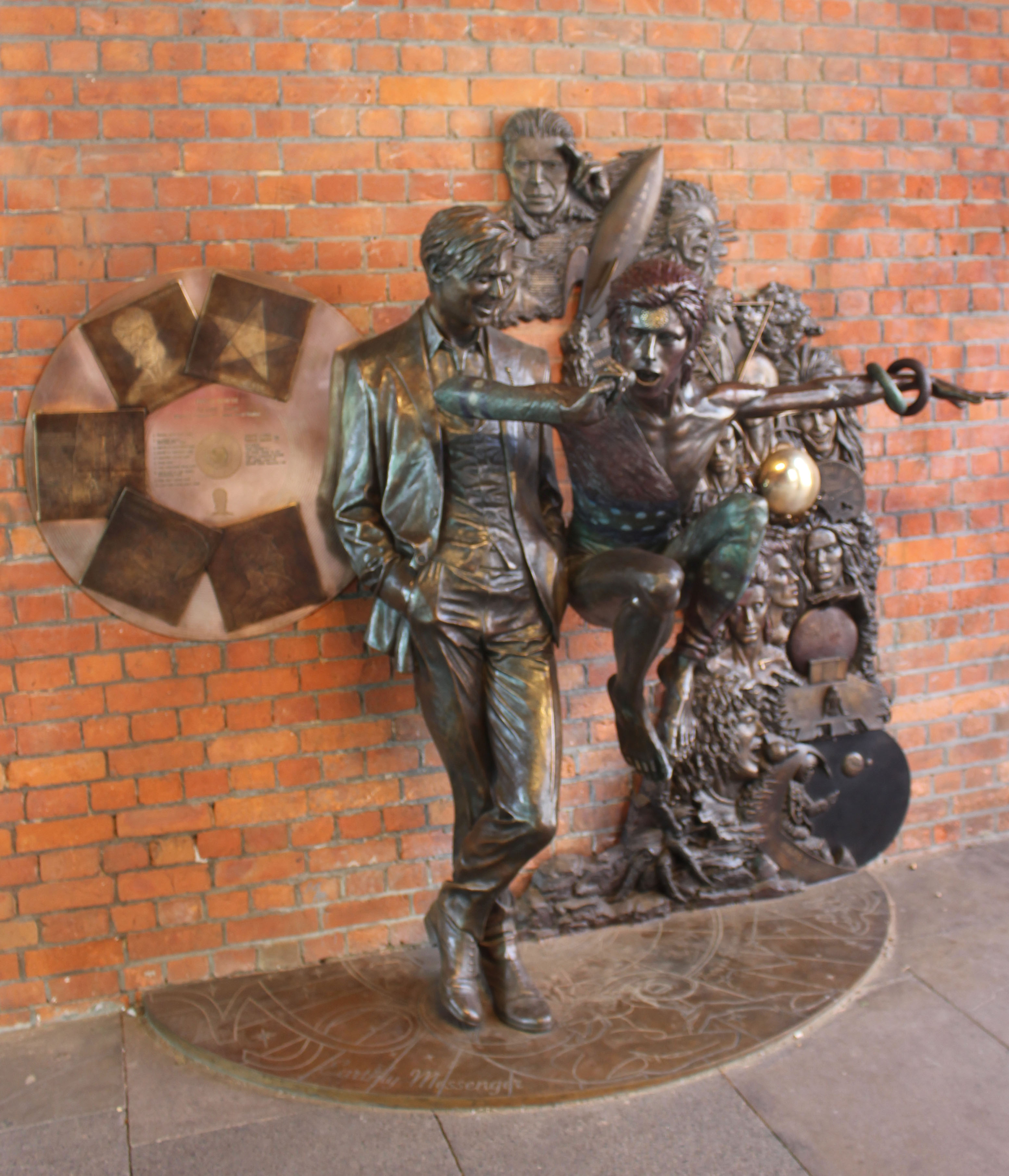
Statue of Bowie in different guises in Aylesbury, Buckinghamshire, the town where he debuted Ziggy Stardust in 1972

In 1999, Bowie was made a Commander of the Ordre des Arts et des Lettres by the French government, and received an honorary doctorate from Berklee College of Music. He declined the royal honour of Commander of the Order of the British Empire in 2000, and turned down a knighthood in 2003. He said later: "I would never have any intention of accepting anything like that. I seriously don't know what it's for. It's not what I spent my life working for."

During his lifetime, Bowie sold over 100 million records worldwide, making him one of the best-selling music artists. (Note: Additional sources place this figure somewhere between 100 million and 150 million.) In the UK, he was awarded nine platinum, eleven gold and eight silver albums, and in the US, five platinum and nine gold. Bowie was announced as the best-selling vinyl artist of the 21st century in 2022.

On its 2020 list of the "500 Greatest Albums of All Time", Rolling Stone included The Rise and Fall of Ziggy Stardust and the Spiders from Mars at number 40, Station to Station at 52, Hunky Dory at 88, Low at 206, and Scary Monsters at 443. Its updated 2021 list included "'Heroes'" at number 23, "Life on Mars?" at 105, "Space Oddity" at 189, "Changes" at 200, "Young Americans" at 204, "Station to Station" at 400, and "Under Pressure" at 429. Four Bowie songs are included in the Rock and Roll Hall of Fame's 500 Songs that Shaped Rock and Roll.

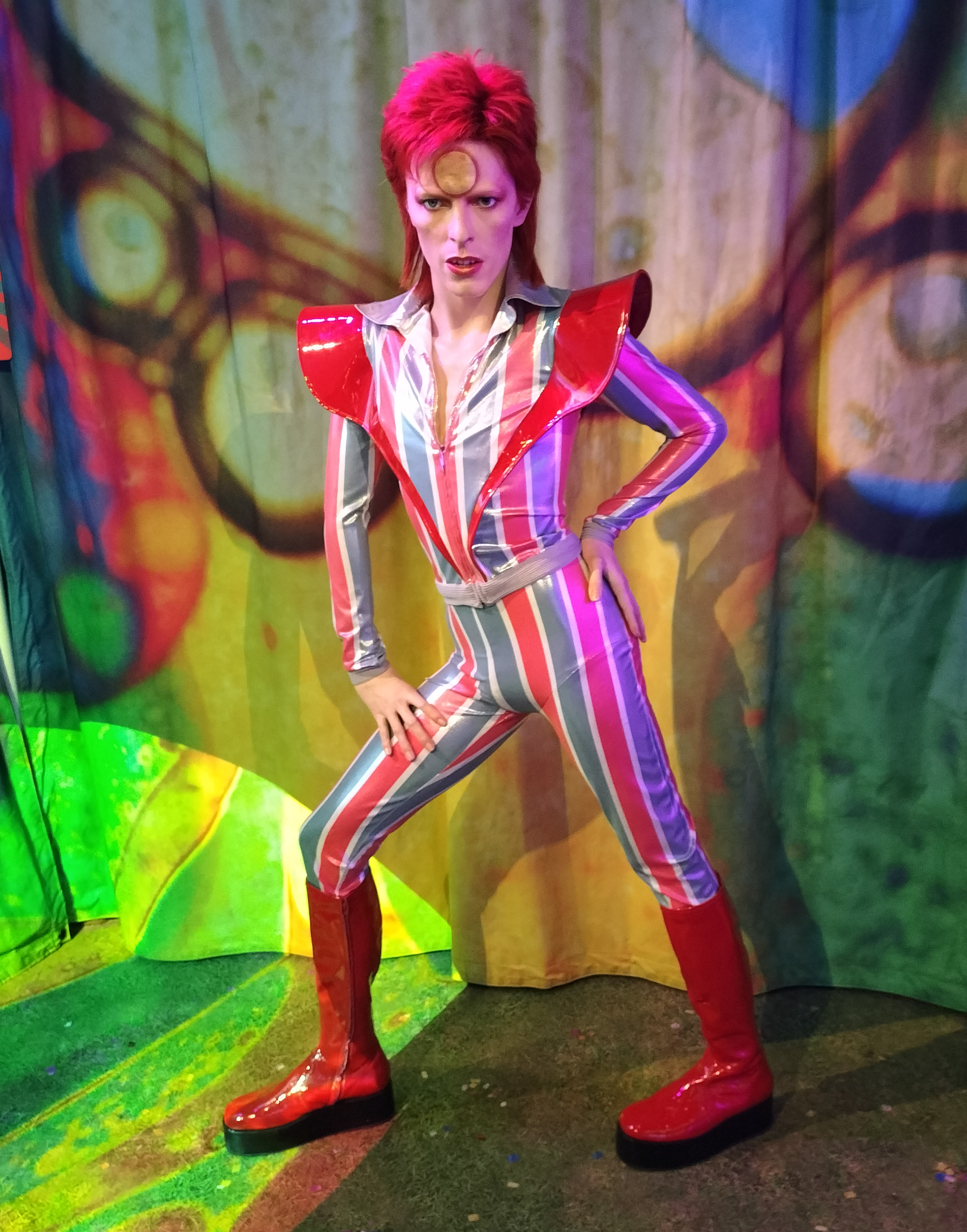
Wax figure of Bowie at Madame Tussauds, London

In the BBC's 2002 poll of the 100 Greatest Britons, Bowie was 29th. In 2004, he was 39th on the Rolling Stone's 100 Greatest Artists of All Time. Bowie was inducted into the Rock and Roll Hall of Fame in 1996, the Songwriters Hall of Fame in 2005, and the Science Fiction and Fantasy Hall of Fame in 2013. A poll by BBC History in 2013 named Bowie the best-dressed Briton in history. Days after Bowie's death, Rolling Stone contributor Rob Sheffield proclaimed him "the greatest rock star ever". The magazine also listed him as the 39th greatest songwriter of all time. In 2022, Sky Arts ranked him the most influential artist in Britain of the last 50 years. He ranked 32nd on the 2023 Rolling Stone list of the 200 Greatest Singers of All Time.

== Commemoration ==
- In 2008, the spider Heteropoda davidbowie was named in Bowie's honour.
- In 2011, his image was chosen by popular vote for the B£10m note of the local currency of his birthplace, the Brixton Pound.
- In 2015, a main-belt asteroid was named 342843 Davidbowie.
- In 2016, Belgian amateur astronomers at MIRA Public Observatory created a "Bowie asterism" of seven stars which had been in the vicinity of Mars at the time of Bowie's death; the "constellation" forms the lightning bolt on Bowie's face from the cover of his Aladdin Sane album.
- In March 2017, Bowie featured on a series of UK postage stamps.
- In 2018, a statue of Bowie was unveiled in Aylesbury, Buckinghamshire, the town where he debuted Ziggy Stardust. The statue features a likeness of Bowie in 2002 accompanied with various characters and looks from over his career, with Ziggy Stardust at the front.
- Rue David Bowie in Paris is near the Gare d'Austerlitz.

== Discography ==
- David Bowie (1967)
- David Bowie (Note: David Bowie (1969) was the original name for the album in the UK, while in the US it was released a few months later with the subtitle Man of Words / Man of Music (1969), colloquially used as an unofficial retitle to differentiate the release. Following the success of Ziggy Stardust, the album was rereleased worldwide as Space Oddity, after Bowie's well known song of the same name that opened the album. The David Bowie title was reinstated for a 2009 worldwide reissue and Parlophone's 2015 remaster, before the album's 2019 mix reverted back to the Space Oddity title.) (1969)
- The Man Who Sold the World (1970)
- Hunky Dory (1971)
- The Rise and Fall of Ziggy Stardust and the Spiders from Mars (1972)
- Aladdin Sane (1973)
- Pin Ups (1973)
- Diamond Dogs (1974)
- Young Americans (1975)
- Station to Station (1976)
- Low (1977)
- "Heroes" (1977)
- Lodger (1979)
- Scary Monsters (and Super Creeps) (1980)
- Let's Dance (1983)
- Tonight (1984)
- Never Let Me Down (1987)
- Black Tie White Noise (1993)
- The Buddha of Suburbia (1993)
- Outside (1995)
- Earthling (1997)
- Hours (1999)
- Heathen (2002)
- Reality (2003)
- The Next Day (2013)
- Blackstar (2016)
- Toy (posthumous, 2021)

== Selected filmography ==
- The Man Who Fell to Earth (1976)
- Just a Gigolo (1978)
- The Hunger (1983)
- Merry Christmas, Mr. Lawrence (1983)
- Absolute Beginners (1986)
- Labyrinth (1986)
- The Last Temptation of Christ (1988)
- The Linguini Incident (1991)
- Twin Peaks: Fire Walk with Me (1992)
- Basquiat (1996)
- Gunslinger's Revenge (1998)
- Everybody Loves Sunshine (1999)
- Mr. Rice's Secret (2000)
- The Prestige (2006)
- Arthur and the Minimoys (2006)
- August (2008)

== Tours ==
- Ziggy Stardust Tour (1972–73)
- Diamond Dogs Tour (1974)
- Isolar – 1976 Tour (1976)
- Isolar II – The 1978 World Tour (1978)
- Serious Moonlight Tour (1983)
- The Glass Spider Tour (1987)
- Sound+Vision Tour (1990)
- The Outside Tour (1995–96)
- Earthling Tour (1997)
- Hours Tour (1999)
- Mini Tour (2000)
- Heathen Tour (2002)
- A Reality Tour (2003–04)

== See also ==
- List of British Grammy Award winners and nominees
- List of people who have declined a British honour
