= Celebrity bond =

Type of bond endorsed by a celebrity

A celebrity bond is commercial debt security issued by a holder of fame-based intellectual property rights to receive money upfront from investors on behalf of the bond issuer and their celebrity clients in exchange for assigning investors the right to collect future royalty monies to the works covered by the intellectual property rights listed in the bond. Typically backed by music properties, the investment vehicle was pioneered in 1997 by rock and roll investment banker David Pullman through his $55 million David Bowie bond deal.

== Background ==
While a celebrity bond can cover any work of art whose future royalties are based in part on a widespread reputation of the creator of the work, celebrity bonds are usually music-based. For a music-based celebrity bond, the issuer seeks to put together intellectual property rights of one or various artists to "songs that have stood the test of time", typically "top-40 greatest hits across genres from jazz to rap to rhythm and blues". In addition to getting money upfront, artists additionally retain ownership of their work and do not have to pay tax on what the IRS considers a loan since yet-to-be received royalties are re-characterized by the bond agreement as loan interest and principal payments. The artists also pass on the risk to investors that the works backing up the celebrity bond will lose their appeal where the investors are in a better position than the artist to assess such a risk.

== Bowie Bonds ==
Bowie Bonds are asset-backed securities of current and future revenues of the 25 albums (287 songs) that David Bowie recorded before 1990. Bowie Bonds were pioneered in 1997 by rock and roll investment banker David Pullman. Issued in 1997, the bonds were bought for US$55 million by the Prudential Insurance Company of America, or about $110 million in today's dollars. The bonds paid an interest rate of 7.9% and had an average life of ten years, a higher rate of return than a 10-year Treasury note (at the time, 6.37%). Royalties from the 25 albums generated the cash flow that secured the bonds' interest payments. Prudential also received guarantees from Bowie's label, EMI Records, which had recently signed a $30m deal with Bowie. By forfeiting ten years worth of royalties, Bowie was able to receive a payment of US$55 million up front; Bowie used this income to buy songs owned by his former manager. Bowie's combined catalog of albums covered by this agreement sold more than 1 million copies annually at the time of the agreement. Shortly after launching, however, the rise of MP3 sharing caused music piracy to rise, and music sales to drop, which was one of the factors that led Moody's Investors Service to lower the bonds from an A3 rating (the seventh highest rating) to Baa3, one notch above junk status. The downgrade was prompted by lower-than-expected revenue "due to weakness in sales for recorded music" and that an unnamed company guaranteed the issue. Despite this, the Bowie bonds liquidated in 2007 as originally planned, without default, and the rights to the income from the songs reverted to Bowie.

== Other artist rights securitization ==
The Bowie Bond issuance was perhaps the first instance of intellectual property rights securitization, a financial practice of pooling various types of contractual debt such as residential mortgages, commercial mortgages, auto loans or credit card debt obligations and selling said consolidated debt as bonds, pass-through securities, or Collateralized mortgage obligation (CMOs), to various investors. The securitization of the collections of other artists, such as James Brown, Ashford & Simpson and the Isley Brothers, later followed.

In 1998, Pullman raised $30 million for Motown songwriting team Holland–Dozier–Holland, whose hits include Baby I Need Your Loving (1964) and Stop in the Name of Love (1965). Pullman then began putting together a package of works of various songwriters to sell them in a single deal rather than pitching the songs of a single artist. In September 1998, Pullman signed musician Jake Hooker to a celebrity bond. Hooker had co-written the 1982 Joan Jett hit song I Love Rock 'n' Roll. A month later in October, Pullman added to that same bond Duane Hitchings, a songwriter behind popular songs of diverse artists such as Rod Stewart, Tupac Shakur, and Kim Carnes.

The 2005 success of Apple's iTunes and other legal online music retailers has led to a renewed interest in celebrity bonds. However, a 2011 offering by Goldman Sachs for SESAC bonds based on, among others, Bob Dylan and Neil Diamond, was delayed and ultimately canceled due to lack of investor interest. More recently, a range of funds have appeared offering investors access to music royalty streams; examples include Kobalt Capital, Round Hill Music, publicly traded Hipgnosis Songs Fund, The Music Fund and Alignment Artist Capital.

Efforts of competitors in the small celebrity bond market often move towards overlapping. In the late 1990s, Pullman unsuccessfully sued former business partners, who began engaging in the royalty bond business, for misappropriation of what Pullman believed were his trade secrets in this area. Also, Pullman and competitor Parviz Omidvar as of 2012 have filed at least 11 lawsuits and countersuits against one another related to songwriter clients. Pullman's efforts mostly were towards complex financial deals and Omidvar's efforts have been more akin to a pawnbroker offering secured loans to artists who offer intellectual property collateral, with the unwritten expectation that the commercial note be paid off within weeks.

As of 2012, Pullman himself assumes the risk for the stream of future royalties by purchasing royalties outright from artists who are looking to sell instead of packaging them for others to buy.
