= Statue of David Bowie =

2018 sculpture in Aylesbury, England

David Bowie Statue
- Earthly Messenger
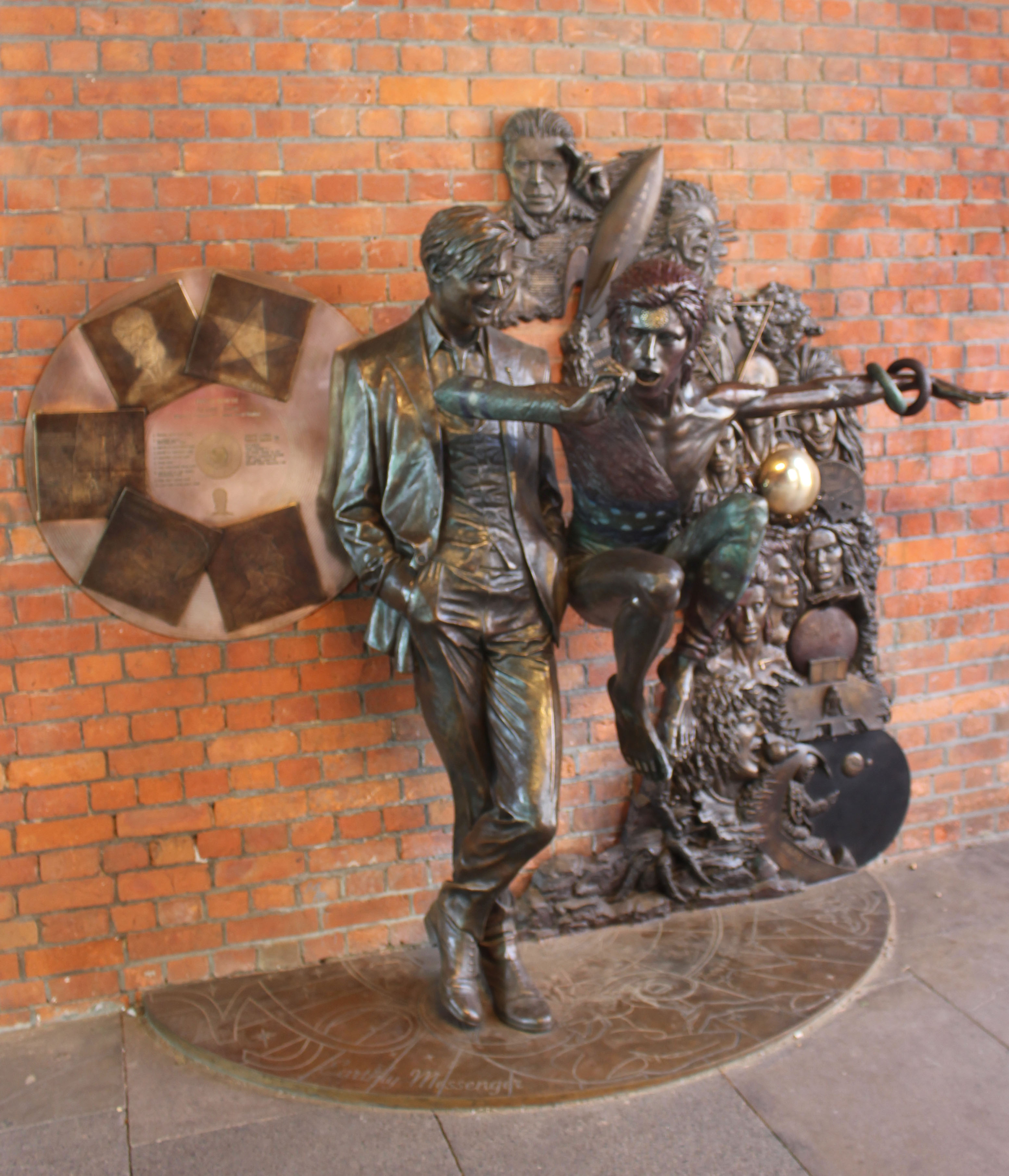
- Interactive map of David Bowie Statue
- Location: Market Square, Aylesbury
- Coordinates: 51.8158°N 0.8119°W
- Designer: Andrew Sinclair
- Type: Statue
- Material: Bronze
- Opening date: 25 March 2018
- Dedicated to: David Bowie

Earthly Messenger is a bronze sculpture of David Bowie sculpted by Andrew Sinclair and unveiled in 2018 in Market Square, Aylesbury, Buckinghamshire by Howard Jones.

== Statue ==
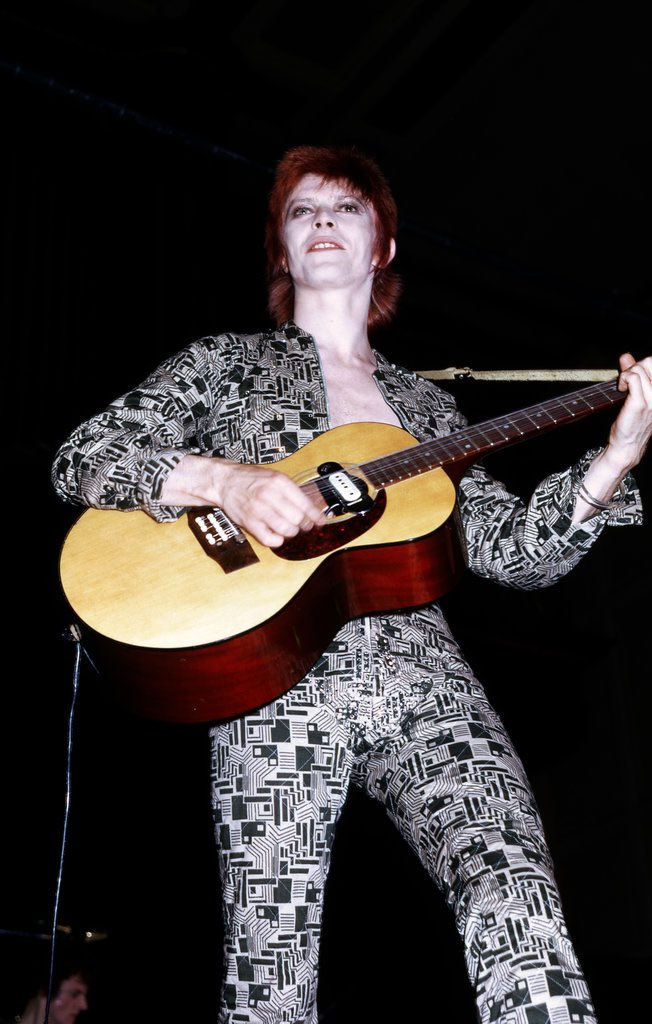
Bowie as Ziggy Stardust

The statue was unveiled in 2018 in Aylesbury where Bowie debuted his Ziggy Stardust character. Entitled "Earthly Messenger", it is situated in Market Square. It features a likeness of Bowie from 2002 and a selection of his alter egos down the years, with Ziggy at the front. Speakers mounted above the life-size piece play a Bowie song every hour.

Money to create the work was raised through grants and a £100,000 crowdfunding appeal by music promoter David Stopps.

== Critical reception ==
The statue received mixed reviews. Online art magazine Artlyst described it as "hideous", poorly rendered and not fitting a man (Bowie) who loved fine art. Rob Stringer, CEO of Sony Music, described the statue as “beautiful”.

== Vandalism ==
Less than 48 hours after the statue was unveiled, it was vandalised. "Feed the homeless first" was written in front of it, "RIP DB" on a wall beside it and a section of the statue was painted on. In October 2018, it was vandalised for a second time with graffiti sprayed onto the statue, some pavements, doors and hoardings.
