= Personal life of David Bowie =

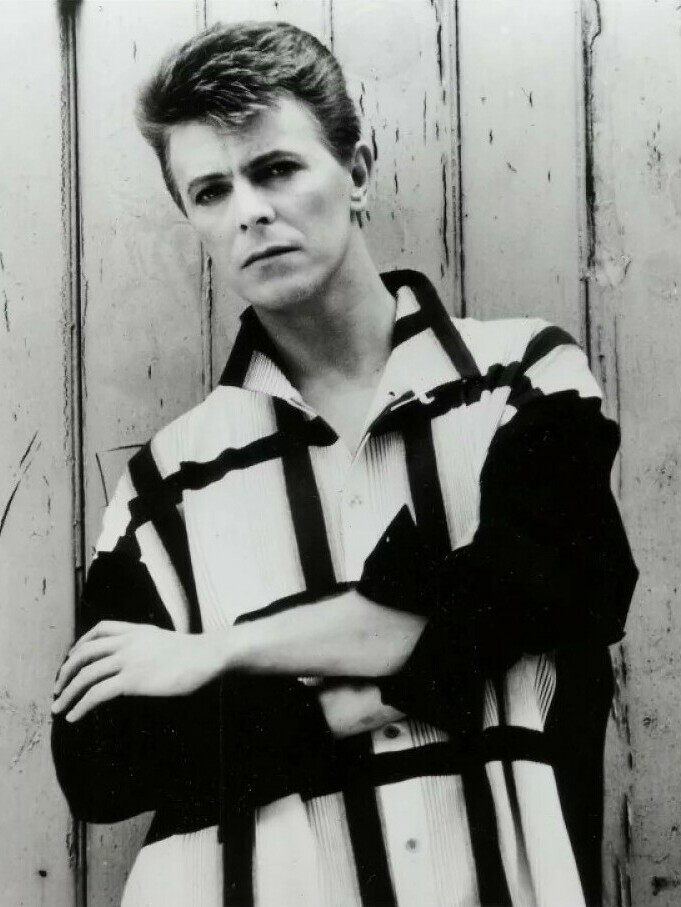
David Bowie in 1984

David Bowie (1947–2016) had many personal relationships throughout his life. He was married twice and had two children, one with each woman. His first marriage to Angie Bowie was an open marriage, during which the pair dated other people. His second marriage to Iman lasted the rest of his life.

Bowie's sexuality was debated. He had sexual relationships with men and women throughout the 1960s and 1970s. He famously came out as gay in a 1972 interview, affirming his bisexuality in 1976, although he later called these declarations a mistake, saying in a 1983 interview that he "was always a closet heterosexual".

Bowie explored various themes of spirituality and religion throughout his life. In the late 1960s, after several failed singles, he attempted to become a Buddhist monk before returning to music. In the early 1970s, he became fascinated with occultism, which inspired several songs throughout the decade. Although he denied having a religious stance in 1987, he continued exploring religious themes, such as gnosticism and Christianity, for the rest of his musical career.

In 1976, Bowie, as his persona the Thin White Duke, made comments supporting fascism. These partly inspired the formation of the Rock Against Racism movement. He later retracted these statements, blaming them on mental instability caused by drug addiction. Throughout the rest of his life, he made occasional political statements in interviews and through his music.

== Family ==
=== Parents and half-brother ===
Bowie's parents were Margaret "Peggy" Jones (1913–2001) and Haywood Stenton "John" Jones (1912–1969). Peggy was a waitress at a cinema in Royal Tunbridge Wells, and John was a promotions officer for the children's charity Barnardo's. John died in early August 1969, shortly after the single release of "Space Oddity". Bowie lost touch with Peggy following his commercial breakthrough in the early 1970s, but resumed contact in 1992 after his marriage to Iman.

Terry Burns (1937–1985) was Bowie's paranoid schizophrenic half-brother. Burns was a major influence on Bowie's songwriting in the early 1970s. The narrator of his 1970 song "All the Madmen" was both inspired by and about him, while his 1971 song "The Bewlay Brothers" was "very much based on myself and my brother". By 1970, Burns was confined to London's Cane Hill Hospital, graced on the original cartoon cover of The Man Who Sold the World and the lines "mansions cold and grey" on "All the Madmen". Burns was a fan of the rock band Cream and took Bowie to see them play in the 1960s. Bowie later attempted covers of Cream's "I Feel Free" for Pin Ups (1973) and Scary Monsters (and Super Creeps) (1980) before finally recording it for Black Tie White Noise (1993). Burns died by suicide in 1985. Bowie loosely based his 1993 song "Jump They Say" on Burns, saying in an interview: "It's the first time I've felt capable of addressing it."

=== Marriages ===
==== Angie Bowie ====
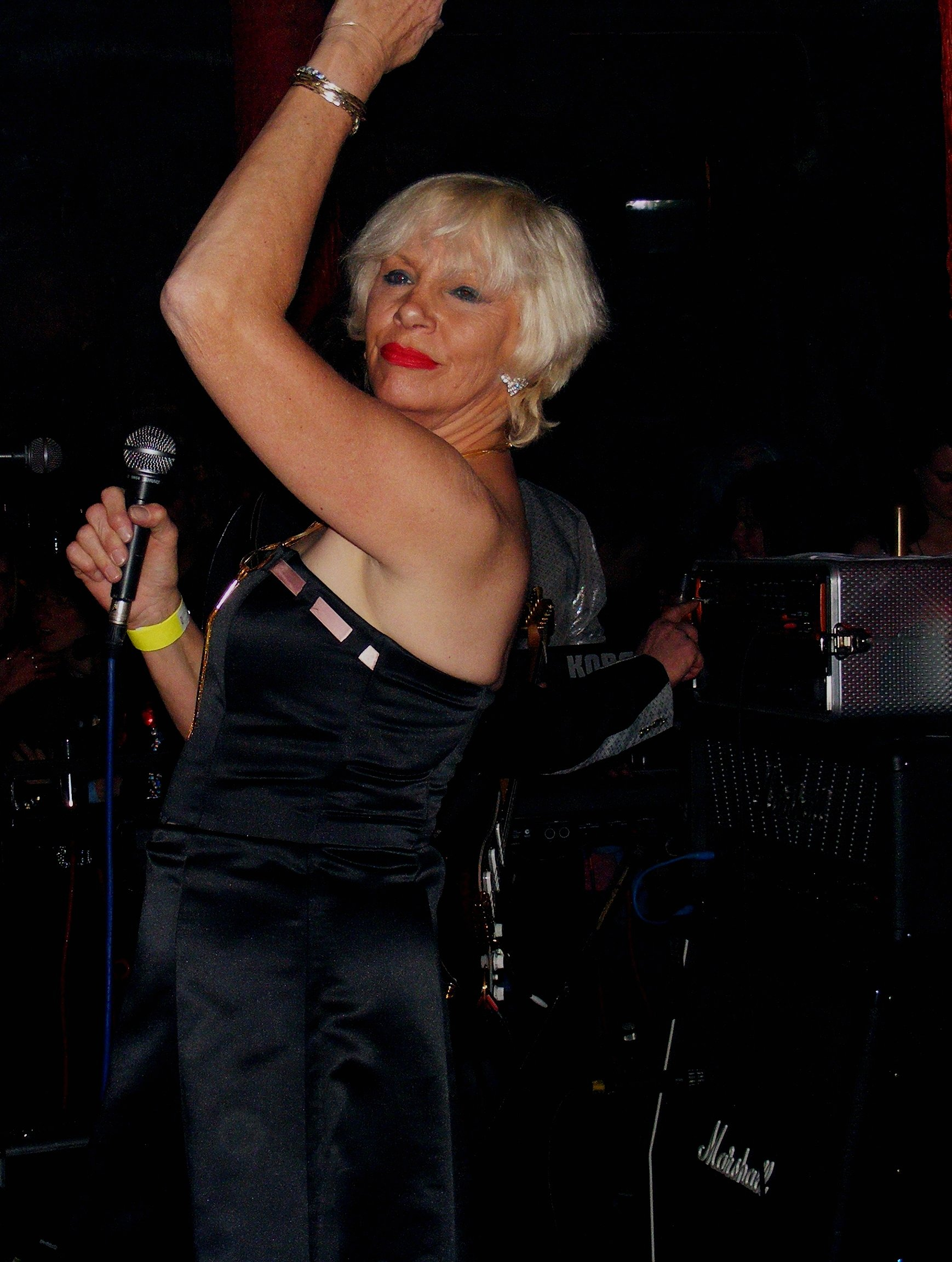
Angie Bowie in 2010

Bowie met his first wife, Mary Angela Barnett, through the music executive Calvin Lee, having their first date on 30 May 1969. According to longtime producer Tony Visconti, "Calvin Lee was besotted with David—and his hidden agenda was to have him as a boyfriend. But Angie Bowie, who arrived on the scene during the recording of [The Man Who Sold the World], squashed all possibility of that." David wrote his 1970 single "The Prettiest Star" for Angie, playing it down the telephone as part of his proposal to her on Christmas 1969. They married on 19 March 1970 at Bromley Register Office in Bromley, London, two weeks after the single flopped.

Angie later described her and David's union as a marriage of convenience. "We got married so that I could [get a permit to] work. I didn't think it would last and David said, before we got married, 'I'm not really in love with you' and I thought that's probably a good thing," she said. Bowie said about Angie that "living with her is like living with a blow torch". The couple had an open marriage and dated other people during it. They divorced on 8 February 1980; David received custody of Duncan. After the expiration of the gag order that was part of their divorce agreement, Angie wrote a memoir of their turbulent marriage, titled Backstage Passes: Life on the Wild Side with David Bowie.

==== Iman ====
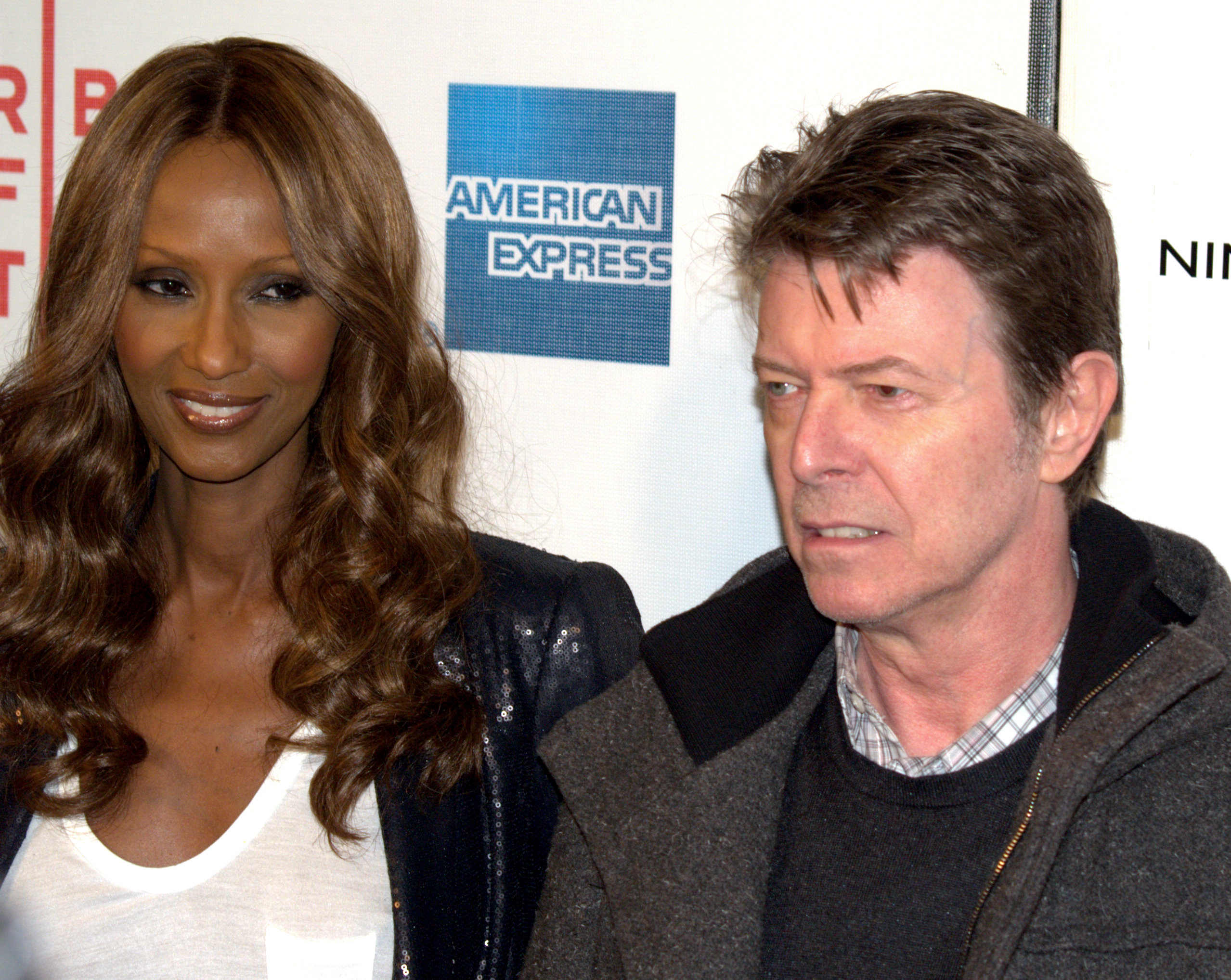
Bowie and wife Iman, 2009

David met Somali-American model Iman in Los Angeles following the Sound+Vision Tour in October 1990. They married in a private ceremony in Lausanne on 24 April 1992. The wedding was solemnised on 6 June in Florence. The couple's marriage influenced the content of Black Tie White Noise, particularly on tracks such as "The Wedding"/"The Wedding Song" and "Miracle Goodnight". The couple resided primarily in New York City and London and owned an apartment in Sydney's Elizabeth Bay and Britannia Bay House on the island of Mustique. Despite their fame, the couple were successful in living a mostly private life in Manhattan, being able to walk around the city unnoticed.

Following Bowie's death, Iman expressed gratitude that the two were able to maintain separate identities throughout their marriage. She also said she would never remarry, refusing to address him as her "late" husband. On the 10th anniversary of Bowie's death, Iman shared a new Blackstar tattoo commemorating him, featuring the five black star segments that spell out "Bowie" on that album's cover artwork.

=== Children ===
==== Duncan Jones ====
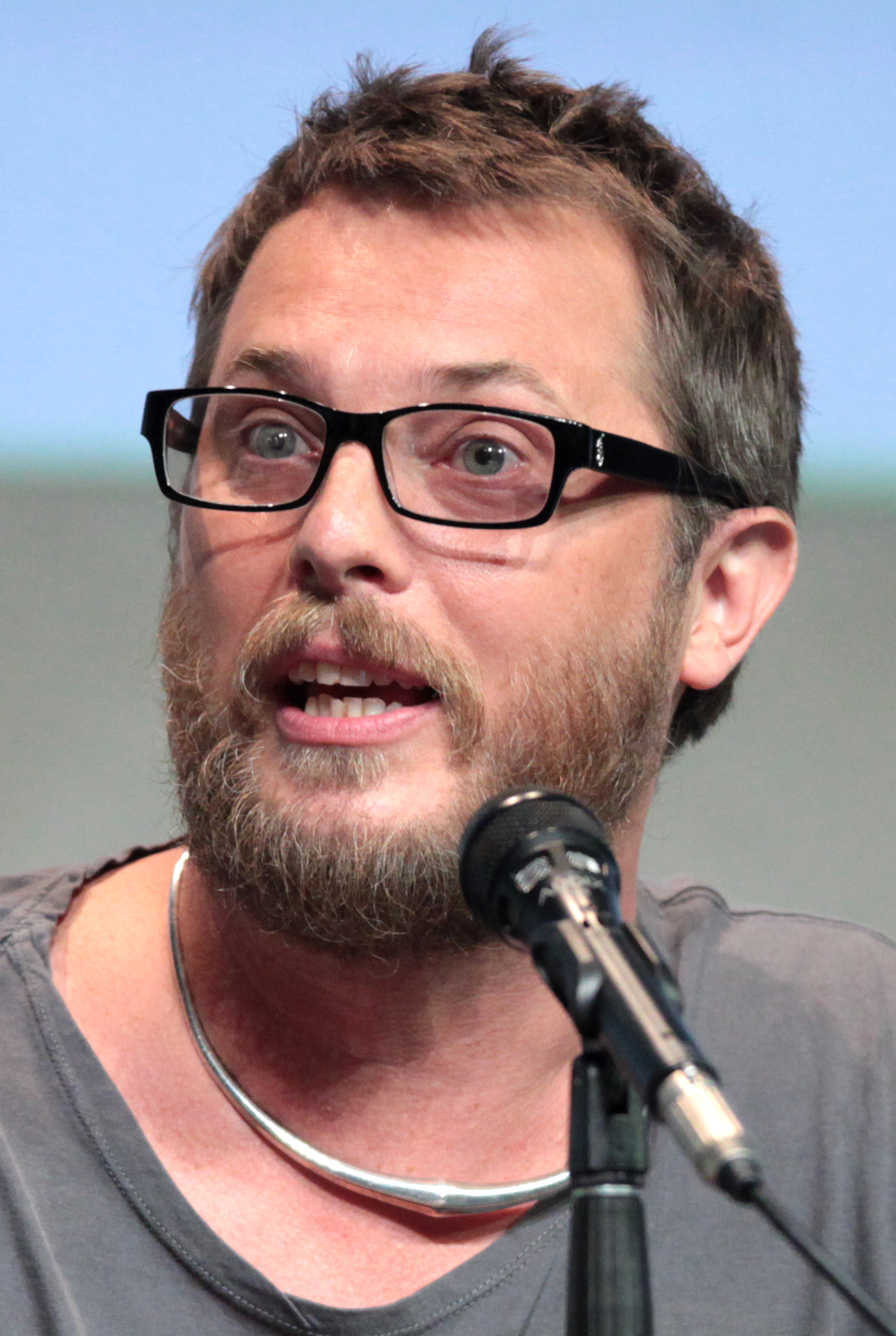
"Kooks" is a tribute to Bowie's son Duncan Jones (pictured in 2015).

David and Angie had one son, Duncan Zowie Haywood Jones, born on 30 May 1971 shortly before the sessions for Hunky Dory began; David wrote the song "Kooks" as a tribute to his newborn. On Duncan's opinion of the song, Bowie said in 1999: "He likes it. Yeah, he's got fondness for it. He knows full well that it was written for him."

Duncan was mostly raised by his father David and his Scottish nanny, Marion Skene. Discussing his father's influence on him, Duncan said that his love for science fiction drew from watching science fiction films with his father growing up as a young boy. David taught his son about moviemaking, from storyboards and script-writing, to lighting and editing. Duncan later said: "While Dad would go on stage, I'd be making my little movies." Duncan visited his father on the sets of The Hunger, Absolute Beginners and Labyrinth in the 1980s. Duncan's interest in filmmaking began with his desire to find a creative outlet that differed from his father's. He told interviewers that growing up, David attempted to teach his son several instruments, including piano, saxophone, guitar and drums, which he disliked. Following Bowie's death in 2016, Duncan said: "He gave me the time and the support to find my feet, and the confidence to do what I do."

==== Lexi Jones ====
Bowie and Iman's daughter, Alexandria "Lexi" Zahra Jones, was born on August 15, 2000, in New York City, midway through the sessions for the Toy project. Jones initially lived a private life, despite her parents' public lives. She was offered modelling jobs, but Iman rejected them, citing her own experiences as a model and wanting her daughter to live a private life for as long as possible. Throughout her teens, Jones struggled with mental health issues. When David Bowie died on January 10, 2016, Jones was 15 years old and living at a residential treatment centre in Utah. The last time she spoke to her father was two days earlier on January 8, his 69th birthday, when she said "I told him I loved him and he said it back, and we both knew".

Professionally, Jones launched a fashion clothing line in 2023. In 2025, she released her debut studio album, Xandri, which she wrote, produced and performed herself. Following the album's release, Jones spoke out about being compared to her father, noting she is "not trying to fill his shoes" rather "just trying to find [her] own peace."

== Other relationships ==
=== 1960s ===
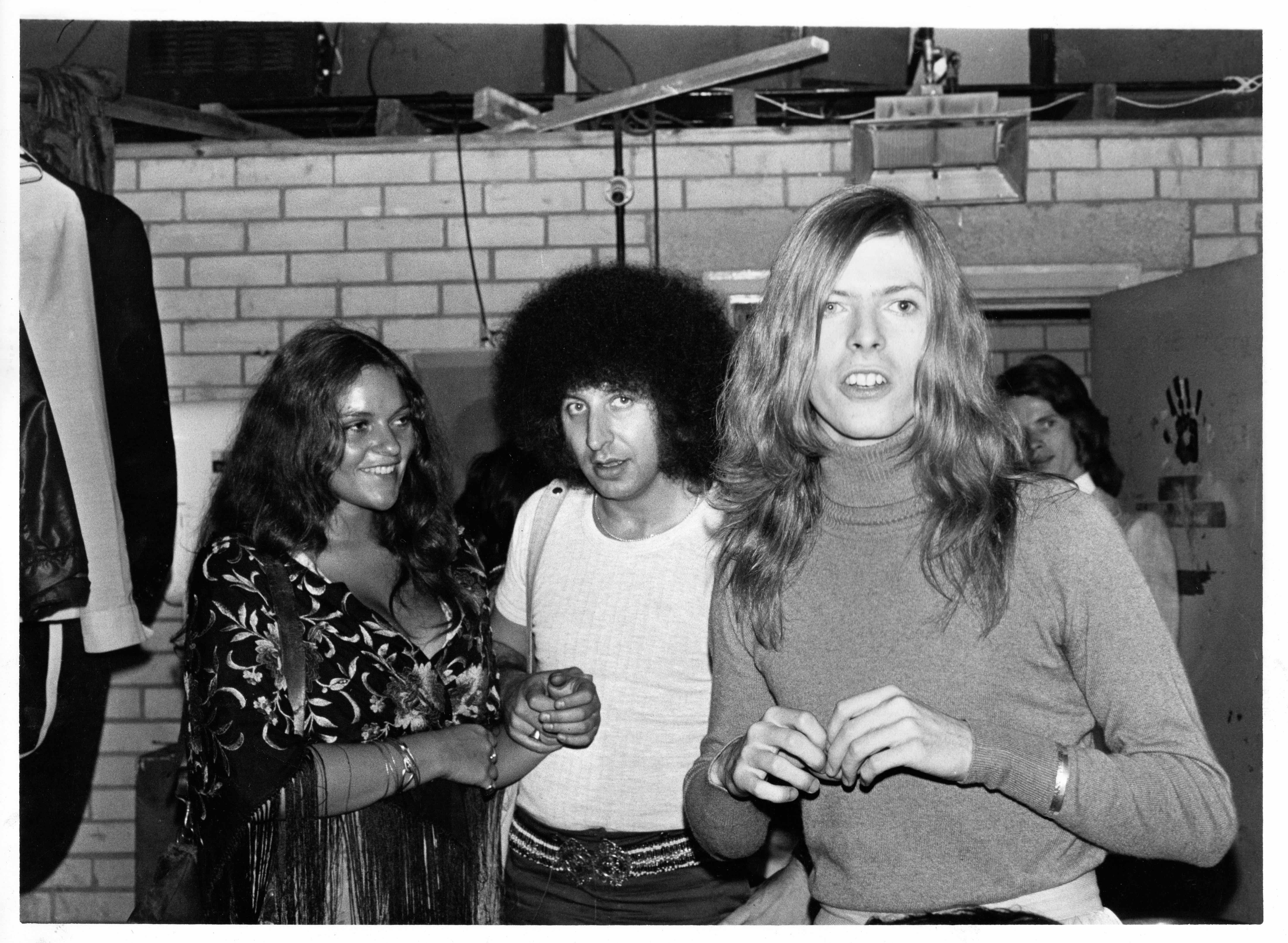
Left to right: Dana Gillespie, Tony Defries and David Bowie at Andy Warhol's Pork at London's Roundhouse in 1971

Bowie began a decade-long personal and professional relationship with the singer Dana Gillespie in 1964 when he was 17 and she was 14. Bowie wrote the song "Andy Warhol" for her, Gillespie sang backing vocals on the Ziggy Stardust album (1972), and Bowie and Mick Ronson produced her 1973 album Weren't Born a Man. Bowie ended contact with Gillespie following his split from Angie. Gillespie looked back on her time with David fondly.

Bowie met the dancer Lindsay Kemp in 1967 and enrolled in his dance class at the London Dance Centre. They became lovers and Kemp would be critical in Bowie's artistic development. Kemp later said: "I taught him ... to express himself through his body ... how to touch a public ... just as important was the stillness and to make every movement count." Commenting in 1972, Bowie said that meeting Kemp was when his interest in image "really blossomed": and that Kemp "lived on his emotions, he was a wonderful influence. His day-to-day life was the most theatrical thing I had ever seen, ever. It was everything I thought Bohemia probably was. I joined the circus." According to the author Paul Trynka, Bowie's relationships with other men were "short-lived and often opportunistic; the thrill was usually in the discovery." When Bowie briefly resided with his former manager Kenneth Pitt in the late 1960s, Pitt recalled having several naked encounters with Bowie, which he said were humorous and not sexual. When asked about Bowie's true sexual orientation, Pitt stated, "I honestly don't know."

In January 1968, Kemp choreographed a dance scene for a BBC play, The Pistol Shot, and used Bowie with a dancer, Hermione Farthingale; the pair began dating and moved into a London flat together. Bowie and Farthingale broke up in early 1969 when she went to Norway to take part in a film, Song of Norway; this affected him, and several songs, such as "Letter to Hermione" and "An Occasional Dream", reference her; and, for the video accompanying his 2013 song "Where Are We Now?", he wore a T-shirt with the words "m/s Song of Norway". Bowie blamed himself for their break-up, saying in 2002 that he "was totally unfaithful and couldn't for the life of me keep it zipped". Farthingale, who spoke of deep affection for him in an interview with the biographer Nicholas Pegg, said they last saw each other in 1970.

After the breakup with Farthingale, and living with his parents, Bowie met the journalist Mary Finnigan in Beckenham, while visiting her upstairs neighbour, Barry. She offered him a cup of tea, tincture of cannabis, and biscuits, then cake and food from the fridge, staying into evening and night, later offering him lodgings for five pounds a week. Bowie briefly dated Finnigan.

=== 1970s ===
David and Angie had an open marriage and dated other people during it: David had relationships with the models Cyrinda Foxe, Lulu, Bebe Buell and the Young Americans backing singer Ava Cherry; Angie had encounters with the Stooges' members Ron Asheton and James Williamson, the Ziggy Stardust Tour bodyguard Anton Jones, and the drummer Roy Martin, which inspired David's 1977 song "Breaking Glass".

=== 1980s ===
In 1983, Bowie briefly dated the New Zealand model Geeling Ng, who starred in the video for "China Girl". While filming The Hunger the same year, Bowie had a sexual relationship with his co-star Susan Sarandon, who stated in 2014: "He's worth idolising. He's extraordinary." Between 1987 and 1990, Bowie dated the Glass Spider Tour dancer Melissa Hurley. The two began their relationship at the end of the tour when she was 22 years old. Bowie's Tin Machine collaborator Kevin Armstrong remembered her as "a genuinely kind, sweet person". She inspired the song "Amazing" on Tin Machine (1989). They announced their engagement in May 1989 but never married; Bowie broke the relationship off during the latter half of the Sound+Vision Tour, primarily due to the age difference—he was 43 at the time. He later spoke of Hurley as "such a wonderful, lovely, vibrant girl".

=== Coco Schwab ===
Corinne "Coco" Schwab was Bowie's personal assistant for 43 years, from 1973 until his death in 2016. Originally a receptionist at the London office of Bowie's former music publisher MainMan, Schwab assisted in extracting Bowie from MainMan's financial grip, after which he invited her to be his personal assistant. Bowie referred to Schwab as his best friend and credited her for saving his life in the 1970s by helping him quit his drug addiction; he dedicated the 1987 song "Never Let Me Down" to her. Schwab maintained close guard of him and did not get along with Angie, who later blamed Schwab for the downfall of her and David's marriage. Bowie left $2 million to Schwab in his will.

== Sexuality ==
Bowie's sexuality has been the subject of debate. While married to Angie, he famously declared himself gay in a 1972 interview with Melody Maker journalist Michael Watts, which generated publicity in both Britain and America; Bowie was adopted as a gay icon in both countries. According to the biographer David Buckley, "If Ziggy confused both his creator and his audience, a big part of that confusion centred on the topic of sexuality." He affirmed his stance in a 1976 interview with Playboy, stating: "It's true—I am a bisexual. But I can't deny that I've used that fact very well. I suppose it's the best thing that ever happened to me." His claim of bisexuality has been supported by Angie and Tony Zanetta, Bowie's tour manager and the president of MainMan.

In 1983, Bowie told Rolling Stone writer Kurt Loder that his public declaration of bisexuality was "the biggest mistake I ever made" and "I was always a closet heterosexual". On other occasions, he said his interest in homosexual and bisexual culture had been more a product of the times and the situation in which he found himself than of his own feelings. (Note: In 1993, Bowie recalled having read City of Night in the 1960s, and it connected with his loneliness. "And that led me a merry dance in the early Seventies, when gay clubs really became my lifestyle and all my friends were gay".) Blender asked Bowie in 2002 whether he still believed his public declaration was his biggest mistake. After a long pause, he said, "I don't think it was a mistake in Europe, but it was a lot tougher in America. I had no problem with people knowing I was bisexual. But I had no inclination to hold any banners nor be a representative of any group of people." Buckley wrote that Bowie "mined sexual intrigue for its ability to shock". According to Mary Finnigan, David and Angie "created their bisexual fantasy". Bowie once told Bob Grace, an executive of the music label Chrysalis, "This is my wife, she gets boys for me, and I get girls for her—and we're all very happy!" The author Christopher Sandford wrote that David "made a positive fetish of repeating the quip that he and his wife had met while 'fucking the same bloke' ... Gay sex was always an anecdotal and laughing matter".

Bowie's relationship with gay culture was complicated; he was not an active supporter of gay rights. Zanetta explained: "He was attracted to the gay culture because he loved its flamboyance. Sometimes it was just an expression of communication—sometimes it was a way of... assimilating someone. But it was never his primary thing, and once the girls came flocking, it didn't matter." In his book Queer Noises, the critic John Gill criticised Bowie for seemingly outing himself solely to impress a heterosexual critic like Watts. Nevertheless, Gill acknowledged that Bowie's coming out was important for "real queers" coming to terms with their own sexualities. This is affirmed by Trynka, who said that Bowie's announcement "was a beacon that would eventually draw a generation of kids to London or a new life or both". According to the biographer Marc Spitz, his 1983 Rolling Stone interview was viewed as "an act of betrayal" by some queer fans. Slate magazine's J. Bryan Lowder argued that Bowie pioneered the strategy of hinting at fluid identities, keeping straight audiences intrigued and queer fans devoted. Following Bowie's death in 2016, the BBC's Mark Easton stated that gay rights and gender equality would not have "enjoyed the broad support they do today without Bowie's androgynous challenge all those years ago".

== Spirituality and religion ==
Searching for music is like searching for God. There's an effort to reclaim the unmentionable, the unsayable, the unseeable, the unspeakable.

— David Bowie on religion

Bowie joined the choir of St. Mary's Church in Bromley, south London, when he was about nine years old. According to his childhood friend George Underwood, the choir gave him and Bowie a chance to socialise and "had nothing to do with religion". Beginning in 1967 from the influence of his half-brother, Bowie became interested in Buddhism and, with commercial success eluding him, he considered becoming a Buddhist monk. Spitz states that Buddhism reminded Bowie that other goals in life existed outside fame and material gain and one can learn about themselves through meditation and chanting. Buddhism inspired some of Bowie's songs of the period, including "Silly Boy Blue" and "Karma Man". After a few months' study at Tibet House in London, he was told by his Lama, Chime Rinpoche, "You don't want to be Buddhist. ... You should follow music."

After leaving Buddhism, Bowie became fascinated with the work of the occultist Aleister Crowley, whose ideas inspired songs such as "After All" (1970) and "Holy Holy" (1971), while Crowley was directly name-checked in "Quicksand" (1971). By 1972, Bowie adapted Christian imagery for his Ziggy Stardust character, who is described as being "like a leper Messiah" and "the Nazz", a nickname given to Jesus of Nazareth by the poet Lord Richard Buckley. By 1975, deep into his cocaine addiction, Bowie immersed himself in Crowley's works, occultism, the Christian Kabbalah and the "Stations of the Cross", both referenced in the song "Station to Station" (1976). Bowie called the Station to Station album "extremely dark ... the nearest album to a magick treatise that I've written". (Note: He later said he was influenced by his cocaine addiction and the "psychological terror" from making The Man Who Fell To Earth, marking "the first time I'd really seriously thought about Christ and God ... I very nearly got suckered into that narrow [view of] finding the Cross as the salvation of mankind".)

Bowie's explorations of spiritual messages continued throughout his career. He later stated that "questioning [his] spiritual life [was] always ... germane" to his songwriting. In 1983's "Modern Love", his lyrics proclaimed him putting his trust in "God and Man", with "no confession" and "no religion". The following year's "Loving the Alien" saw him rallying against religious violence. In 1987, he denied following any particular religion or religious philosophy. Five years later, after marrying Iman, he said they knew that their "real marriage, sanctified by God, had to happen in a church in Florence". Earlier that year, he knelt on stage at The Freddie Mercury Tribute Concert and recited the Lord's Prayer before a television audience. (Note: Asked why he knelt and prayed, Bowie said he had a friend who was dying of AIDS. "He was just dropping into a coma that day. And just before I went on stage, something just told me to say the Lord's Prayer. The great irony is that he died two days after the show".) In 1993, Bowie said he had an "undying" belief in the "unquestionable" existence of God. Interviewed in 2005, Bowie said whether God exists "is not a question that can be answered. ... I'm not quite an atheist and it worries me. There's that little bit that holds on: 'Well, I'm almost an atheist. Give me a couple of months. ... I've nearly got it right.'" He had a tattoo of the Serenity Prayer in Japanese on his calf.

Bowie's later works continued his religious journey. Earthling (1997) showed "the abiding need in me to vacillate between atheism or a kind of gnosticism ... What I need is to find a balance, spiritually, with the way I live and my demise." Hours (1999) included overtly Christian themes, with its artwork inspired by the Pietà. On 2002's Heathen, he "addressed the divine directly", particularly on "I Would Be Your Slave", where he "questioned God’s silence, and suspected or feared God’s mockery". Blackstar's "Lazarus" (2016) began with the words, "Look up here, I'm in Heaven", while the rest of the album deals with other matters of mysticism and mortality.

== Political views ==
In his first-ever television interview, Bowie, under the name Davie Jones, spoke out about prejudice against long-haired men after he and his then-band the Manish Boys were asked to cut their hair before a BBC television appearance. He and the Manish Boys were interviewed on the network's 12 November 1964 installment of Tonight to champion their cause, where Bowie claimed to be a spokesperson for the nonexistent Society for the Prevention of Cruelty to Long-Haired Men. He stated on the programme, "I think we all like long hair and we don't see why other people should persecute us because of it."

In several 1976 interviews, speaking as the Thin White Duke persona and "at least partially tongue-in-cheek", he made statements that expressed support for fascism and perceived admiration for Adolf Hitler. Bowie was quoted as saying: "Britain is ready for a fascist leader ... I think Britain could benefit from a fascist leader. After all, fascism is really nationalism ... I believe very strongly in fascism, people have always responded with greater efficiency under a regimental leadership." He was also quoted as saying: "Adolf Hitler was one of the first rock stars" and "You've got to have an extreme right front come up and sweep everything off its feet and tidy everything up." These comments, along with Eric Clapton's comments in support of Enoch Powell at that time, have been named as an inspiration for the formation of the Rock Against Racism movement. Bowie retracted his comments in an interview with Melody Maker in October 1977, blaming them on mental instability caused by his drug problems, saying: "I was out of my mind, totally, completely crazed." In the same interview, Bowie described himself as "apolitical", stating:

the more I travel and the less sure I am about exactly which political philosophies are commendable. The more government systems I see, the less enticed I am to give my allegiance to any set of people, so it would be disastrous for me to adopt a definitive point of view, or to adopt a party of people and say 'these are my people'.

In the 1980s and 1990s, Bowie's public statements shifted sharply towards anti-racism and anti-fascism. In an interview with MTV anchor Mark Goodman in 1983, Bowie criticised the channel for not providing enough coverage of Black musicians, becoming visibly uncomfortable when Goodman suggested that the network's fear of backlash from the American Midwest was one reason for such a lack of coverage. Bowie described the music videos for "China Girl" and "Let's Dance" as "very simple, very direct" statements against racism. The album Tin Machine took a more direct stance against fascism and neo-Nazism, and was criticised for being too preachy. In 1993, he released the single "Black Tie White Noise" which dealt with the 1992 Los Angeles riots. In 2007, Bowie donated $10,000 to the defence fund for the Jena Six saying, "there is clearly a separate and unequal judicial process going on in the town of Jena".

When Bowie won the British Male Solo Artist award at the 2014 Brit Awards, he referenced the forthcoming Scottish independence referendum by saying, "Scotland, stay with us." This garnered a significant reaction throughout the UK on social media.
