= City-As-School High School =

Public school in New York City

Coordinates: 40°43′44.79″N 74°0′22.04″W

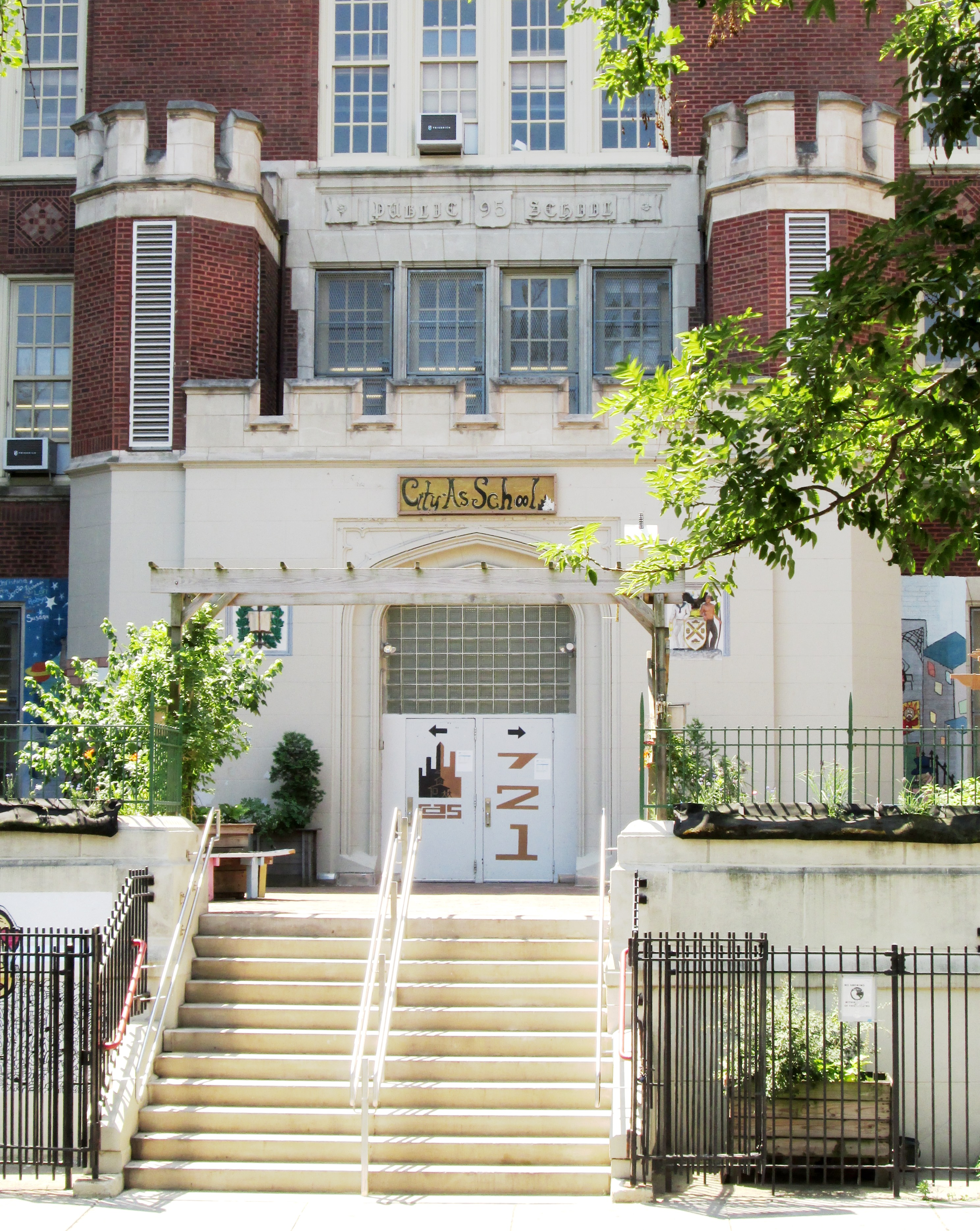
The entrance to City-As-School (2016)

City-As-School (CAS) is a public high school located at 16 Clarkson Street between Hudson Street and Seventh Avenue South in the West Village of Manhattan, New York City which was established in 1972. It is one of the oldest alternative public high schools in the United States.

== History ==
CAS was founded by Frederick J. Koury and Rick Safran in 1972. They chose New York City for the “schoolhouse” and their proposal was approved by the Board of Education of the City of New York.

CAS received funding from the Board of Education and additional grants from the Ford Foundation, and opened with ten seniors in 1973. To attract students, CAS advertised on WABC radio, targeting students who were considering dropping out. Their first class eventually grew to 61 students.

== Administration and organization ==
City As School is led by Rachel Seher.

Past principals are:

- Fred Koury 1972–1989
- Rick Safran (acting interim) 1989–1990
- Marsha Brevot 1990–1992
- Paul Forestieri (acting interim) 1992–1993
- Bob Lubetsky 1993–2006
- Michael Edwards (acting interim) 2006–2007
- Toni Scarpinato 2007–2010
- Alan Cheng 2010–2018
- Rachel Seher 2018–current

== Admissions ==
Students are required to register for an internship each cycle; a cycle is half the time of a regular semester. Currently, CAS has over 500 open internship relationships. Graduation from CAS requires a portfolio presentation before a panel of adults and peers.

To apply to CAS, a student must be at least 16 years old and have a minimum of 16 high school credits; thus, new students have usually completed about two years of high school elsewhere. Additionally, a personal interview is conducted.

== Academics ==
Although guided by an advisor, students are responsible for registering for classes and internships four times a year. CAS does not use letter grades; students receive either credit (C) or no credit (NC).

== Campuses ==
CAS's main campus is located at 16 Clarkson Street in Greenwich Village in New York City. There are also two satellite locations: in the Bronx at Tremont Avenue and Bruckner Boulevard, and in Brooklyn on Flatbush Avenue next to the Manhattan Bridge. City-As-School Queens opened in 1995 and closed in 2002. The original school was in a brownstone on Schermerhorn Street in Brooklyn. The first class was held in September 1973.

== Notable alumni ==
- Kamal Ahmed (Jerky Boys) (born 1966) – director, writer, actor
- Decora (rapper) (born 1984) – hip hop artist, producer, performance poet and social activist
- Dallas Penn (1970–2024) – urban fashion designer
- Asa Akira – pornographic actress
- Sunny Bak (born 1958) – commercial photographer and celebrity
- Jean-Michel Basquiat (1960–1988) – graffiti artist, film director
- Michael Dominic (born 1970) – award-winning documentary filmmaker and photojournalist
- Julia Fox (born 1990) – actress and model
- Adam Horovitz (Ad-rock) (born 1966) – member of the Beastie Boys, son of playwright Israel Horovitz
- Destiny Frasqueri (Princess Nokia) (born 1992) – rapper, actress
- Ephrem Lopez (DJ Enuff) (born 1969) – DJ and radio personality
- Ayodele Maakheru – musician, composer, and bandleader, winner of the ASCAP songwriter award (2004)
- Franck de Las Mercedes (born 1972) – visual artist
- Zoe Leonard (born 1961) – artist
- Mekhi Phifer (born 1974) – film actor
- Victor Rasuk (born 1984) – actor; winner, Independent Spirit Award (2002)
- Ryder Ripps (born 1986) – conceptual artist
- Seth Zvi Rosenfeld (born 1961) – playwright and screenwriter
- Dante Terrell Smith (Mos Def) (born 1973) – musician and actor
- Shyne (born 1978)-Belizean Politician, Former musician
- Patty Smyth (born 1957) – rock musician; married to tennis player John McEnroe
- Warren Shaw (born 1970) – sound editor
- Vincent Spano (born 1962) – television and film actor
- Mia Tyler (born 1978) – model, daughter of Aerosmith lead singer Steven Tyler and actress Cyrinda Foxe
- Charles Malik Whitfield (born 1970) – film and television actor
- Bob Woodruff (singer) (born 1961) – singer, songwriter, musician
- Malik Yoba (born 1967) – film and television actor
- Dante Ross (born 1965) – music executive and author
- Martin Shkreli (born 1983) – American investor, businessman and criminal
