= Leee Black Childers =

American photographer and manager (1945–2014)

- Born: Lee Black Childers; July 24, 1945; Jefferson County, Kentucky, U.S.
- Died: April 6, 2014 (aged 68); Los Angeles, California
- Education: Kentucky Southern College
- Occupations: Photographer; writer; rock music manager
- Notable work: Andy Warhol's Pork
- Parent(s): Ova Childers, Harriet Black

Leee Black Childers (July 24, 1945 – April 6, 2014) was an American photographer, writer and rock music manager, who "recorded the legacy of a theatrical cross over between rock music and gay culture." Born Lee Black Childers in Jefferson County, Kentucky he started to spell his name with three rather than two "e"s as a child.

== Biography ==
Leee Black Childers was born on July 24, 1945, in or near Louisville, Kentucky, to Ova Childers, a railroad switchman, and Harriet Black, who later went by Kathlyn Black Stone. He had two brothers, Larry and Henry. He attended Kentucky Southern College before moving to San Francisco, California, and later, in 1968, to New York City where he witnessed the Stonewall Riots.

He began taking photographs of drag queens and was encouraged by Andy Warhol to work as a photographer, gaining a reputation for his portraits of the artists, musicians, and others who passed through the Factory in New York. Childers photographed the nightlife and later the punk scene of New York City. When he was 24 years old, he moved from Kentucky to San Francisco.

In the early 1970s, Childers was a stage manager and photographer for Warhol's only stage production Pork, directed by Tony Ingrassia at the Roundhouse in London. His photographs from the production were part of the exhibit, "Warhol Live: Music and Dance in Warhol's Work," at the Andy Warhol Museum in 2009. Childers was also the stage manager for Jackie Curtis’s play Femme Fatale in 1970. He was an assistant to Warhol at the Factory between 1982 and 1984, and took photographs of visiting celebrities, counter-cultural figures and musicians, particularly of punk rock and new wave music stars, such as Ruby Lynn Reyner, Debbie Harry, Jayne County, and the Sex Pistols. He worked as a tour manager for David Bowie, Iggy Pop, Johnny Thunders, and Mott the Hoople, among others. David Bowie was a fan of Andy Warhol's work, and because of that he hired several of the people that were involved in the production of Pork, which included: Leee Black Childers, Cherry Vanilla, and Tony Zanetta. In his time with David Bowie, Childers became his official tour photographer for Ziggy Stardust. Leee Black Childers's relationship with Bowie got him a job at his record management company MainMan.

In 2012, he published Drag Queens, Rent Boys, Pick Pockets, Junkies, Rockstars and Punks, a collection of some of his photographs and their backgrounds, which was the subject of exhibitions in London in 2011 and Los Angeles, California, in March 2014. Childers's photographs of the punk scene are known worldwide.

In 2016, Childers's 2010 interview was featured in Danny Says, appearing alongside Danny Fields, Iggy Pop, and Alice Cooper.

Childers died in Los Angeles on April 6, 2014, at the age of 68, from undisclosed causes. At the time of his death, he lived in Brooklyn, New York.
