= Lloyd Sandiford =

Lloyd Sandiford may refer to:

- Sir Lloyd Erskine Sandiford (politician) (1937–2023), 4th Prime Minister of Barbados
- Decora (rapper) (Lloyd Gregory Sandiford, born 1984), American AfroLatinX hip hop artist
