= Romy Haag =

Dutch dancer and singer

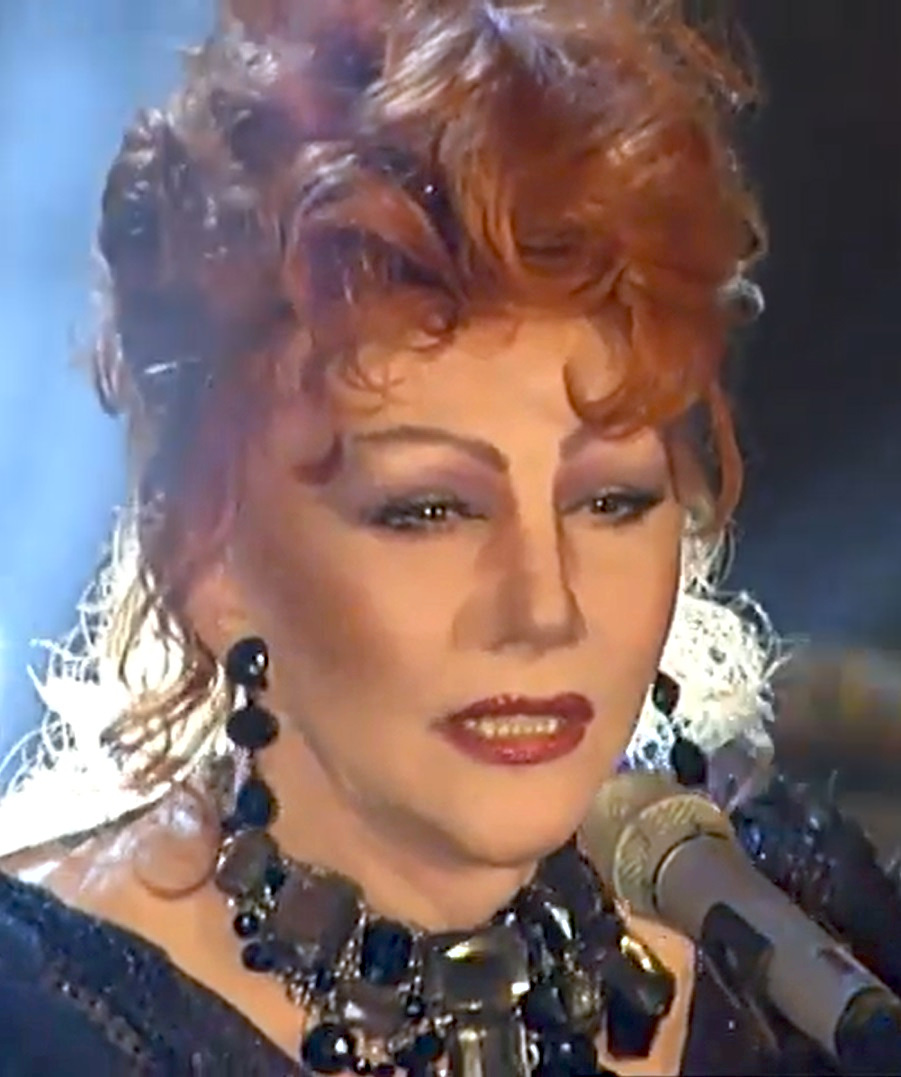
- Haag at Teddy Awards 2011

Background information
- Born: 1 January 1948 (age 78); The Hague, South Holland, Netherlands
- Genre: Pop
- Occupations: Singer, dancer
- Instrument: Vocals
- Years active: 1961–present

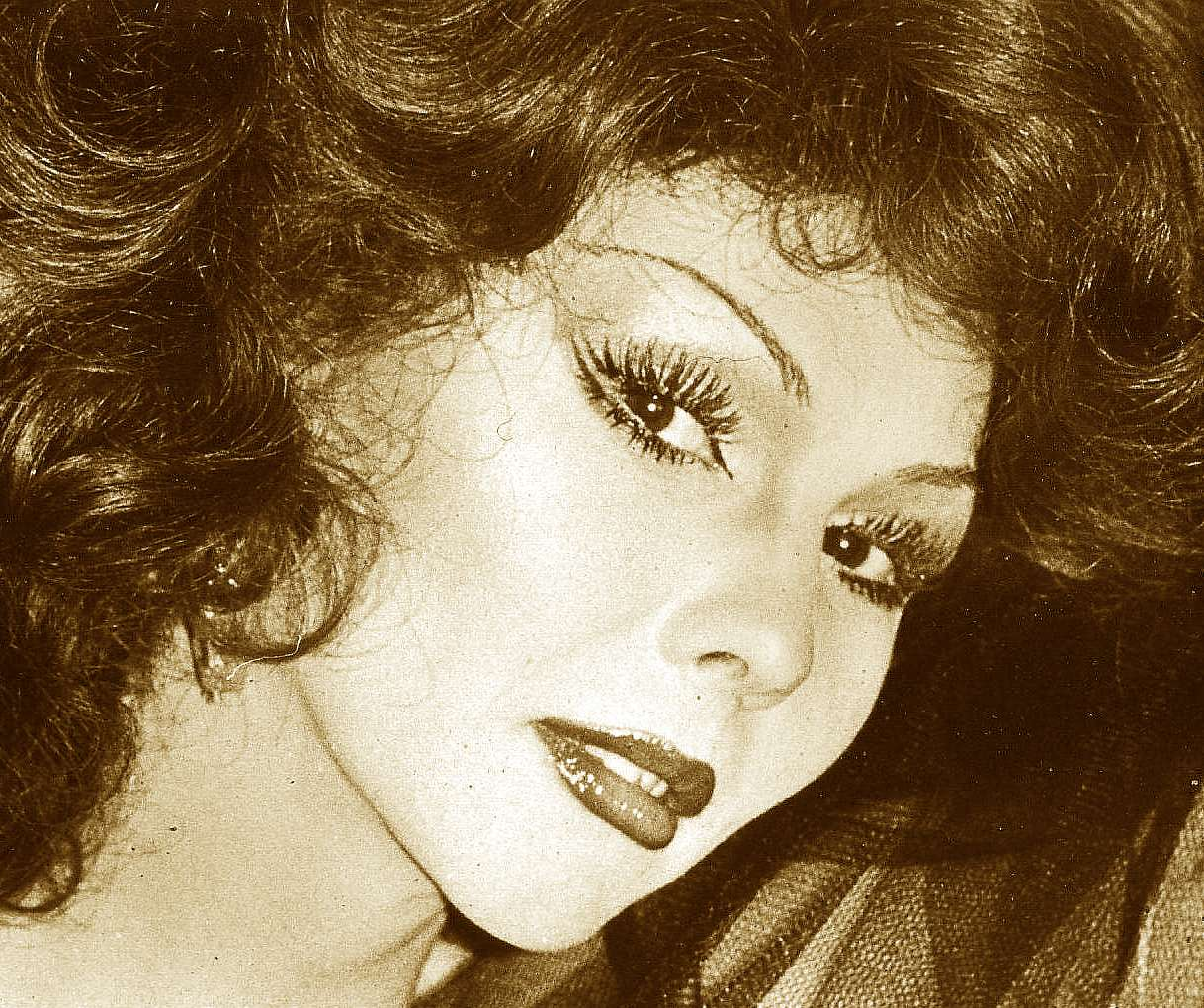
Romy Haag (age unknown)

Romy Haag (born 1 January 1948) is a Dutch dancer, singer, actress and former nightclub manager. In 1999, her autobiography Eine Frau und mehr was published, in which she describes her life in the art scene in the USA and Berlin in the 1970s. She has had roles in 26 films, including Plastikfieber, The Case of Mr. Spalt (Zum Beispiel Otto Spalt), The Hamburg Syndrome and Mascara with Charlotte Rampling. She released 17 albums.

== Early life ==
Romy Haag was born Edouard Frans Verba in 1948 in Scheveningen, Netherlands. Haag, having been assigned male at birth, felt like a girl from early on and was thus physically abused by her father and others and harassed by her peers. When she was around 12 years old, she first ran away from home to Paris, where she began to live a fully female identity under the new name Romy Haag and started hormone replacement therapy and work as a dancer. In her mid 30s, she had gender reassignment surgery.

== Career ==
In 1972, an American show manager offered Haag a tour booking and she performed her show Berlin Chanson at Fire Island, in Long Island and Atlantic City. There she met and fell in love with a street musician from Berlin and decided to move back to Europe to live in the German city with him.

In 1974, at age 26, she opened her own cabaret, named Chez Romy Haag, in Berlin-Schöneberg. Visitors to the venue included Udo Lindenberg, Zizi Jeanmaire, Patricia Highsmith, Bryan Ferry, Tina Turner, Horst Buchholz, Grace Jones, Rainer Werner Fassbinder, Iggy Pop, Freddie Mercury, Lou Reed and Mick Jagger, whom she first met in 1973.

In 1976, Haag and David Bowie began a romantic relationship. Bowie subsequently moved to Berlin and completed his first German tour.

Haag's first single "Liege-Samba" appeared in 1977, with Udo Lindenberg contributing the lyrics and music. She went on tour with Lindenberg, and in the following year, released her single "Superparadise". In 1979, The New Yorker profiled her in a photo tribute. In 1981, her first album So bin ich was released with Klaus Hoffmann contributing the lyrics.

In 1983, Haag sold her night club to travel the world. Returning to Germany in 1986, she began touring Germany, Austria, Switzerland and the U.S. with her City in the Night show. During mid 1980s, Haag was featured in the performance art video installation Queen Zero. During her career, she performed with Conny Göckel, Alexander Kraut, Lutz Woite, Friedel Schwarz, Erik Küppers, Blacky Schwarz, Roland Götz, Hansi Wallbaum, Uli Moritz, Eberhardt Fortmann.

In 2010, she had a role as a receptionist in the internet soap opera Doc Love playing alongside Dieter Bach, Oliver Bender and Ellenie Salvo González.

== Honors and awards ==
In 1997 Haag received the Teddy Award at the Berlinale 1997 for her life work. The Teddy Award is awarded in recognition of films with LGBTQIA topics.

The German astronomer Felix Hormuth named one of the minor planets he discovered on 29 January 2009 after Romy Haag. The asteroid is officially named 305660 Romyhaag.

Georg Kajanus wrote a song about her, released on Datas 1983 album 2-Time.

== Discography ==
=== Albums ===
- 1977: Tell! cast recording (With Su Kramer, Jürgen Drews, Udo Lindenberg, Jackie Carter, Alexis Korner) (Telefunken)
- 1981: So bin Ich (Aladin)
- 1983: Flugblatt (Risiko)
- 1985: City in the Night (Constant)
- 1990: Live – Rock n Roll Bitch (1980–1990) (Black-Heart)
- 1992: Live – Leben ist gleich Karneval (Black-Heart)
- 1993: On the Road Again – Chaos in Einheit Tour (Black-Heart)
- 1996: In Concert – Hexenkessel (Black-Heart)
- 1999: Cabaret Berlin (Ricca)
- 2001: Balladen für Huren und Engel (Ricca)
- 2003: Reichtum Chill-Inn-Music (Kraut)
- 2005: Frauen, die ich nicht vergessen kann – Live (Kraut)
- 2010: Moving On (Fpr Music)

=== Singles ===
- 1977: "Liege-Samba" (Telefunken)
- 1978: "Superparadise" (Philips)
- 1979: "Showtime" (Philips)
- 1979: "Catch Me" (Aladin / EMI Electrola)
- 1983: "Rosen Im Schnee" (Aladin)
- 1983: "Non Je Ne Regrette Rien" (Risiko)
- 1985: "In Der Nacht Ist Der Mensch Nicht Gern Alleine" (Constant)
- 1987: "Help Me Make It Through the Night" (EMI)
- 1990: "Süße Kirschen" – Lyric Expedition Featuring Romy Haag (Teldec)
- 1994: "Toujours Retour" (Ricca)
- 2001: "La Vie En Rose" (Monopol)
- 2002: "Memories Are Made of This" (Pool)
- 2012: "Love Will Find a Way" – Romy Haag with Marion Gold (Bon Voyage)
- 2012: "Let's Dance" – Part of the Art Featuring Romy Haag (N/A)
- 2014: "Wunder Gibt Es Nur Im Märchen" (Donato Plögert Musik)

== Filmography ==
- 1987: Ossegg oder Die Wahrheit über Hänsel und Gretel
- 1987: Mascara, Director: Patrick Conrad
- 1988: The Case of Mr. Spalt
- 2014: Laura – Das Juwel von Stuttgart, Director: Rosa von Praunheim

== Radio ==
- 1978: Anthony J. Ingrassia: Berührungen – Director: Götz Naleppa (Hörspiel (Kunstkopf) – RIAS Berlin/NDR)

== Publications ==
- (de) Eine Frau und mehr, Romy Haag, 1999, Quadriga (ISBN 3-88679-328-1).
