= Anthony Ingrassia =

American director, producer, and playwright

- Born: Anthony J. Ingrassia; 1944; Brooklyn, New York City, U.S.
- Died: December 16, 1995 (aged 50–51); Amityville, New York, U.S.
- Occupations: Playwright; producer; director; actor
- Writing career
- Period: 1964 - 1995

Anthony J. Ingrassia (1944 – December 16, 1995), better known as Tony Ingrassia, was an American director, producer, and playwright whose works were produced on Broadway, off-Broadway, off-off-Broadway, and internationally.

== Early years ==
Tony Ingrassia was born in Brooklyn, New York City. The family moved to Massapequa Park on Long Island, when he was 10 years old. He attended Massapequa High School, and began working in theater as a teenager. About his high school experience, Ingrassia said, "My weight was always up and down...it was hard being fat in Massapequa High School, but my teachers encouraged my writing".

After graduating from high school, he attended Hofstra University in Hempstead, New York, for two years.

== Career ==
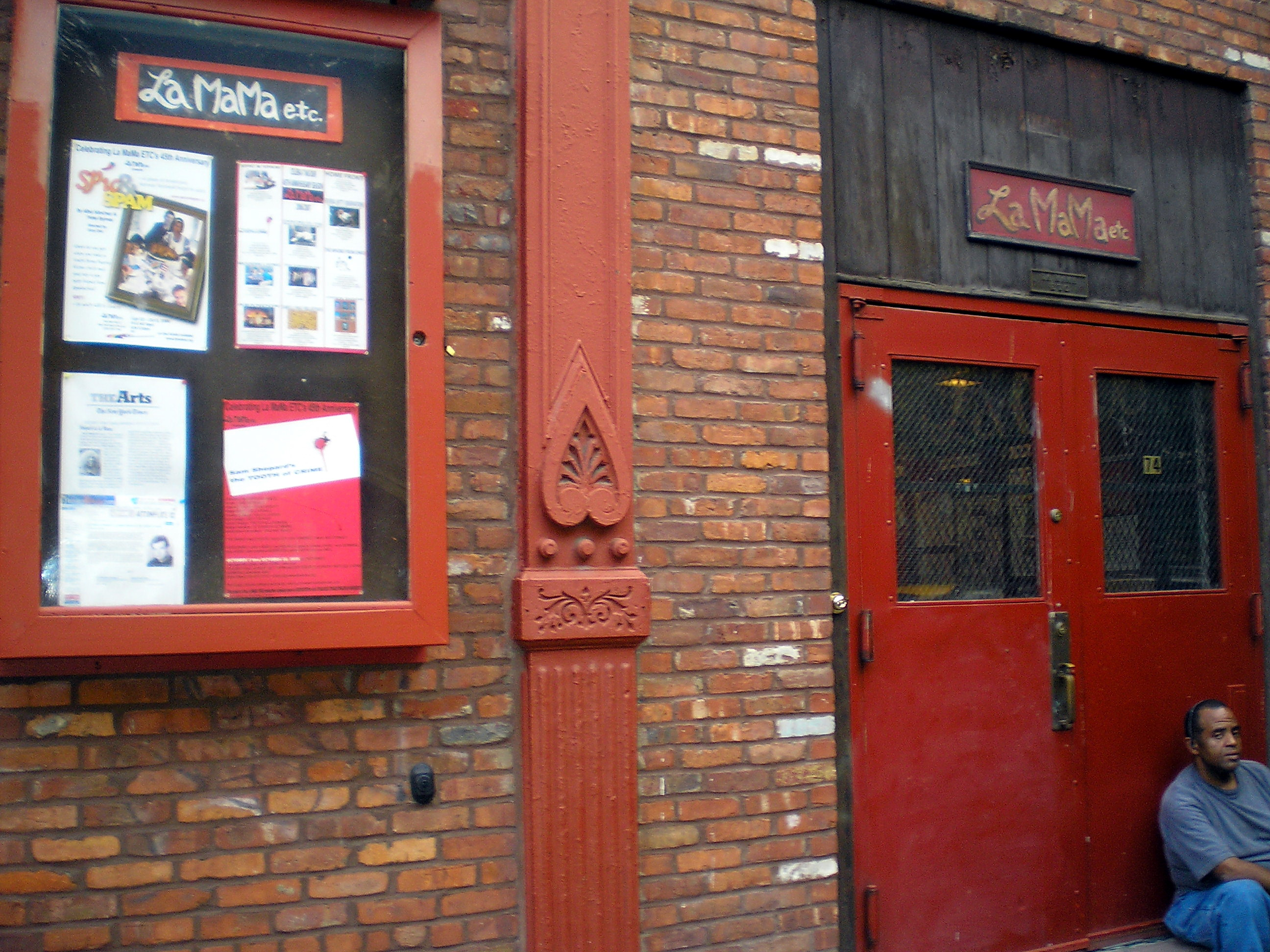
La MaMa Experimental Theater in New York City

Ingrassia was active in experimental theater in New York City during the 1960s.

He wrote and produced Around the World with an Actor in 1964, and Omy Queen of the Faeries and Tidy Passions in 1965. In 1965, he acted in a production of "Two One-Act Plays by Gerald Schoenewolf" at La MaMa Experimental Theatre Club. Around the World with an Actor was also produced at La MaMa in 1965, alongside works by Samuel Avital and John Luca Domagiabe, as "Three New Playwrights".

In 1968, he wrote Sheila, which was produced by the New Theater Workshop. In 1969, he acted in Jackie Curtis's Heaven Grand in Amber Orbit and worked with Charles Ludlam's Ridiculous Theatrical Company for Turds in Hell. He acted in Tom Murrin's Cock-Strong in 1969 and 1970, and in Son of Cock-Strong in 1970. These three productions were all directed by John Vaccaro and performed by his ensemble, the Playhouse of the Ridiculous, at La MaMa. In 1970, he directed Jackie Curtis's Femme Fatale: The Three Faces of Gloria at La MaMa.

Ingrassia was also involved with the ensemble Company One (Through Seven), which changed in number with each production.

Around 1970, he directed Jayne County's World: The Birth of a Nation, the Castration of Man. The play was promoted as a "homosexual fantasy" and was set in a hospital. Jayne played both Florence Nitingale and her sister Ethel Nitingale, and Cherry Vanilla played nurse Tilly Tons.

Following the success of this project, Ingrassia was asked to adapt and direct Andy Warhol's Pork in 1971. The play opened at La MaMa on May 5, 1971 for a two-week run, then played at the Roundhouse in London for a longer run in August 1971. Pork was based on tape recorded conversations between Warhol and superstar Brigid Berlin, during which Brigid would play taped phone conversations between herself and her mother, socialite Honey Berlin. The play featured Cherry Vanilla as Amanda Pork and Jayne County as Vulva.

After returning from London in 1972, Ingrassia wrote and produced Island. The play starred Patti Smith, Cherry Vanilla, and Jayne County. It was set at a beach house on Fire Island and featured a dysfunctional family and their houseguests. Ingrassia reportedly cast Smith for her style and looks, and rewrote the play to feature her character.

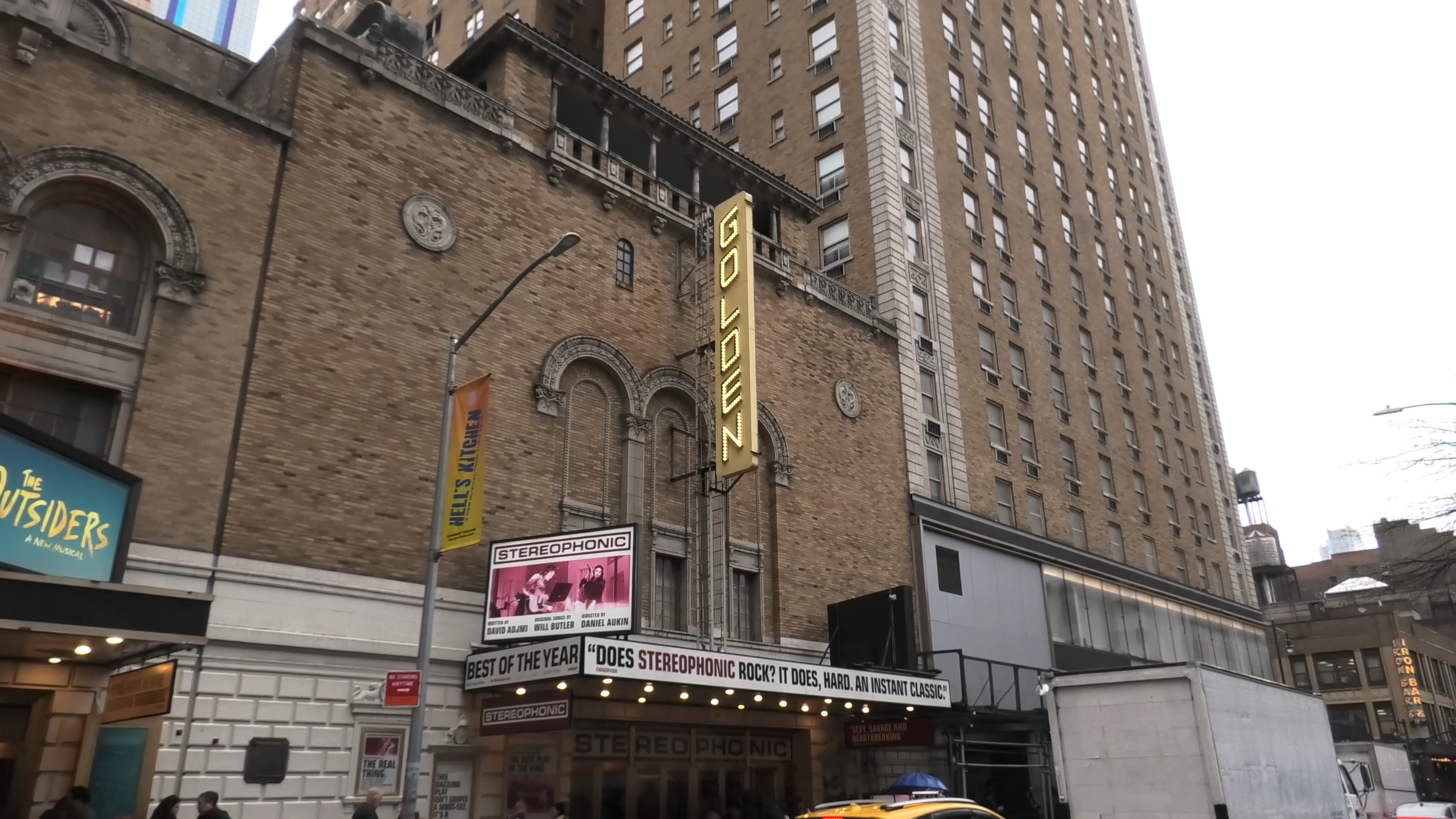
The John Golden Theater in New York City

In 1974, Ingrassia directed Wayne at the Trucks. In November 1974, his play Fame, about Marilyn Monroe, opened at the John Golden Theater on Broadway. Clive Barnes of The New York Times gave Fame a negative review, calling it a "limp rag of a comedy." The play closed after one performance.

After Fame, Ingrassia accepted a Berlin Artist Program grant from the German Academic Exchange Service. While in Berlin, he appeared in a musical revue with Romy Haag and wrote a number of radio plays. Ingrassia stayed in Berlin for six and a half years.

While in Berlin, Ingrassia completed Shindig, a revue using popular music of the 1960s. The musical opened in 1979 at Downstairs at City Center in New York and ran for six performances. The production was reviewed by Robert Palmer of The New York Times, who wrote, "It reproduces a variety of 1960's styles, from soul to bubble gum, with taste, affection and energy." In 1980, Ingrassia revived Sheila, starring Donna Destri, Joy Ryder, Jayne County, Rosie Rocca, and Romy Haag. Cherry Vanilla later replaced Haag. The production was funded by the Berlin Theater Festival.

In 1985, Ingrassia moved back to Massapequa Park to care for his ailing mother. In 1995, he produced a fifty-minute collage of 14 plays, titled Sweet Dreams, at La MaMa. These works were written 1981 and published in Germany, but never produced. The plays included controversial themes such as cross-dressing, heart failure, incest, impotence, suicide, and the unkindness of doctors. The deeper meaning was about being trapped in the wrong family and the wrong relationships. "The hard things that happen to us in life, not being able to express yourself sexually and being so disappointed, that's what it's about," Ingrassia said. "I want people to understand the horror stories and the pain and the feelings in the plays."

== Eating disorders and death ==
Ingrassia's mother died in 1990.

In 1995, Ingrassia died of cardiac arrest at age 51 at Brunswick Hospital in Amityville.

During his lifetime, Ingrassia struggled with eating disorders and weighed up to 600 pounds. He was seeing an eating disorder therapist before his death. He had to use a freight elevator because of his weight, and said, "I'm freight, baby... I still have to fight my food addiction. I don't know how much I really want to talk about it, but maybe this will help somebody." He was survived by his sister Gloria.

== Selected works ==
- Around the World with an Actor (1964)
- Omy Queen of the Faeries (1965)
- Tidy Passions (1965)
- Sheila (1968)
- Island (1972)
- Fame (1974)
- Shindig (1979)
- Sweet Dreams (1995)
