= Sunny Bak =

American photographer

Sunny Bak is an American photographer. She shot the gatefold image of the Beastie Boys on the Licensed to Ill album, and the infamous Lesbian cover for Newsweek in June 1993, which still ranks among their top ten selling issues.

== Early life ==
Sunny Bak was born in Manhattan to Chinese-Indonesian and Korean parents.

== Photography career ==
=== 1970s ===
Sunny Bak began shooting pictures in 1972 at Woodside Junior High School in Queens, New York for her school paper at the age of twelve. Her first subjects for the paper included The Supremes and the Broadway show casts of 1776 and Two Gentlemen of Verona. The school paper rejected her interview with Carly Simon on the grounds that Simon was an unknown at the time. Bak sold the interview to Aktuil, an Indonesian rock magazine, for $100—her first sale.

Sunny Bak opened her first studio in 1976 on Broadway and 18th Street in Manhattan while attending City-As-School. The studio was located at 876 Broadway which was owned at the time by photographer William Biggart, the only journalist to die from the 9/11 attacks. At the same time, Sunny Bak was studying photography under Philippe Halsman at The New School for Social Research in Manhattan.

=== 1980s ===
In the 1980s Sunny Bak developed a style using Polapan film photographing New York City's downtown diva scene, including Michael Musto, Nile Rodgers, Dominique and Madonna, which got her noticed by Annie Flanders, editor in chief and founder of Details magazine. Sunny Bak worked extensively throughout the mid eighties for Details as an advertising and fashion photographer. Her music clients included the Village People, Jellybean Benitez, and Fiona.

In 1984, Bak's intern from City As School, David Scilken introduced her to his former bandmates from the punk rock band, The Young and the Useless who had since changed their style and their name to the Beastie Boys. The Beastie Boys became a semi permanent fixture at her studio where Bak often photographed their candid moments. Her studio became the location for their infamous "Fight For Your Right To Party" video and she shot them numerous times on the Licensed to Ill Tour. Her images of the Beastie Boys can be seen on the albums Licensed to Ill, Solid Gold Hits, Def Jam 25, and "Def Jam Recordings: the First 25 Years of the Last Great Record Label" (Rizzoli 2011).

=== 1990s ===
She lived in London in 1991 and worked as a fashion and music photographer. During this time she shot 10,000 Maniacs, Def American, Danzig, Slayer, Philippe Saisse and Engelbert Humperdinck. In 1992, Sunny Bak moved to Venice in Los Angeles. Currently she shoots celebrity portraiture and produces film and television.
