= Mia Tyler =

American model and actress (b. 1978)

- Born: Mia Abagale Tallarico; December 22, 1978 (age 47); Lebanon, New Hampshire, United States
- Occupations: Model, actress, media personality, socialite
- Spouse: Dave Buckner (m. 2002; div. 2005)
- Children: 1
- Parent(s): Steven Tyler; Cyrinda Foxe
- Relatives: Liv Tyler (paternal half-sister); Jon Foster (brother-in-law)

Mia Abagale Tallarico (born December 22, 1978), better known as Mia Tyler, is an American actress, model, media personality, and socialite.

== Early life and education ==
Tyler is the daughter of rock singer Steven Tyler of the band Aerosmith and actress Cyrinda Foxe. She was born at Alice Peck Day Hospital in Lebanon, New Hampshire, and raised nearby, primarily by Lake Sunapee. She is the paternal half-sister of actress Liv Tyler (whose mother is model and singer Bebe Buell). In 1979, Steven Tyler wrote a song titled after Mia, which was released on the Aerosmith album Night in the Ruts.

Tyler's parents divorced in 1987, and by 1990 she and her mother relocated from New Hampshire to New York City. Her mother died in 2002 of a brain tumor (diagnosed in 1997).

== Career ==
At age 17, Tyler appeared as a VJ on the MTV show House of Style. Primarily a plus sized fashion model, she has been represented by the modeling agency Wilhelmina Models. She has appeared in such elite magazines as Seventeen, Teen, Teen People, Mode, Us, Jump, YM, Moxie Girl, Vogue and on the cover of Flare. She modeled for H&M, MXM, Penningtons and Lane Bryant. She has also appeared on the runways of New York and Paris.

Tyler launched her own clothing line, Revolution 1228, in February 2009.

In 2005 Tyler was a member of the VH1 reality show Celebrity Fit Club, and featured in Really Rich Real Estate, also on VH1, in 2006. In March 2009, Tyler was a judge on Pretty Wicked, a reality show that airs on the Oxygen network.

She has had a few acting roles, including Marsha in Rush Hour 3, and in A Little Bit of Lipstick.

In 2008, Tyler released her autobiography Creating Myself.

She held art shows at various galleries, featuring her X-rated, adult-theme paintings, in 2012.

Tyler along with Steven both appeared in the Season 13 episode of Hell's Kitchen.

== Personal life ==
Tyler lived in Sacramento for many years.

In 2002, Tyler married former Papa Roach drummer Dave Buckner in Sacramento, California; the two were divorced in 2005. She was also engaged to guitarist Brian Harrah, but the couple broke up in 2008. Mia gave birth to a son on May 10, 2017.

After dating former Hell's Kitchen contestant Joseph Tinnelly for three years, Tyler announced their break up in September 2023.
