= Dana Gillespie =

British blues singer (born 1949)

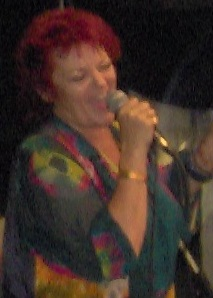
- Dana Gillespie

Background information
- Born: Richenda Antoinette de Winterstein Gillespie; 30 March 1949 (age 77); Woking, Surrey, England
- Genres: Folk; teen pop; rock; blues
- Occupations: Musician; songwriter; actress
- Instrument: Vocalist
- Years active: 1965–present
- Labels: Rev-Ola; Decca; RCA; Bellaphon; Ace
- Website: www.dana-gillespie.com

Richenda Antoinette de Winterstein Gillespie (born 30 March 1949), known professionally as Dana Gillespie, is an English actress, singer and songwriter. Originally performing and recording in her teens, over the years Gillespie has been involved in the recording of over 70 albums, and appeared in stage productions, such as Jesus Christ Superstar, and several films. Her musical output has progressed from teen pop and folk in the early part of her career, to rock in the 1970s and, more recently, the blues.

== Early life ==
Gillespie was born in Woking, Surrey, the second daughter of Anne Francis Roden (née Buxton; 1920–2007) and Hans Henry Winterstein Gillespie (1910–1994), a London-based radiologist of Austrian nobility. Her older sister, Nicola Henrietta St John Raw (née Gillespie, later Smith), was born in 1946. Dana Gillespie was the British Junior Water Skiing Champion in 1962.

== Career ==
Gillespie began a personal and professional relationship with the singer David Bowie in 1964 when he was 17 and she was 14. Their relationship lasted a decade; Bowie wrote the song "Andy Warhol" for her, Gillespie sang backing vocals on Ziggy Stardust (1972), and Bowie and Mick Ronson produced her 1973 album Weren't Born a Man. Bowie ended contact with Gillespie following his split from his first wife Angie Bowie. Gillespie looked back on her time with David Bowie fondly.

Gillespie recorded initially in the folk genre in the mid-1960s. Some of her recordings as a teenager fell into the teen pop category, such as her 1965 single "Thank You Boy", written by John Carter and Ken Lewis and produced by Jimmy Page. Page also played, uncredited, on Gillespie's 1968 debut LP, Foolish Seasons.

She performed backing vocals on the track "It Ain't Easy" from Bowie's The Rise and Fall of Ziggy Stardust and the Spiders from Mars. Her version of "Andy Warhol" was not released until 1973, on her album Weren't Born a Man, which was produced by Bowie and Mick Ronson. Her version also featured Ronson on guitar. Subsequent recordings have been in the blues genre, appearing with the London Blues Band. She is also notable for being the original Mary Magdalene in the first London production of Andrew Lloyd Webber and Tim Rice's Jesus Christ Superstar, which opened at the Palace Theatre in 1972. She also appeared on the Original London Cast album of the show. During the 1980s, Gillespie was a member of the Austrian Mojo Blues Band.

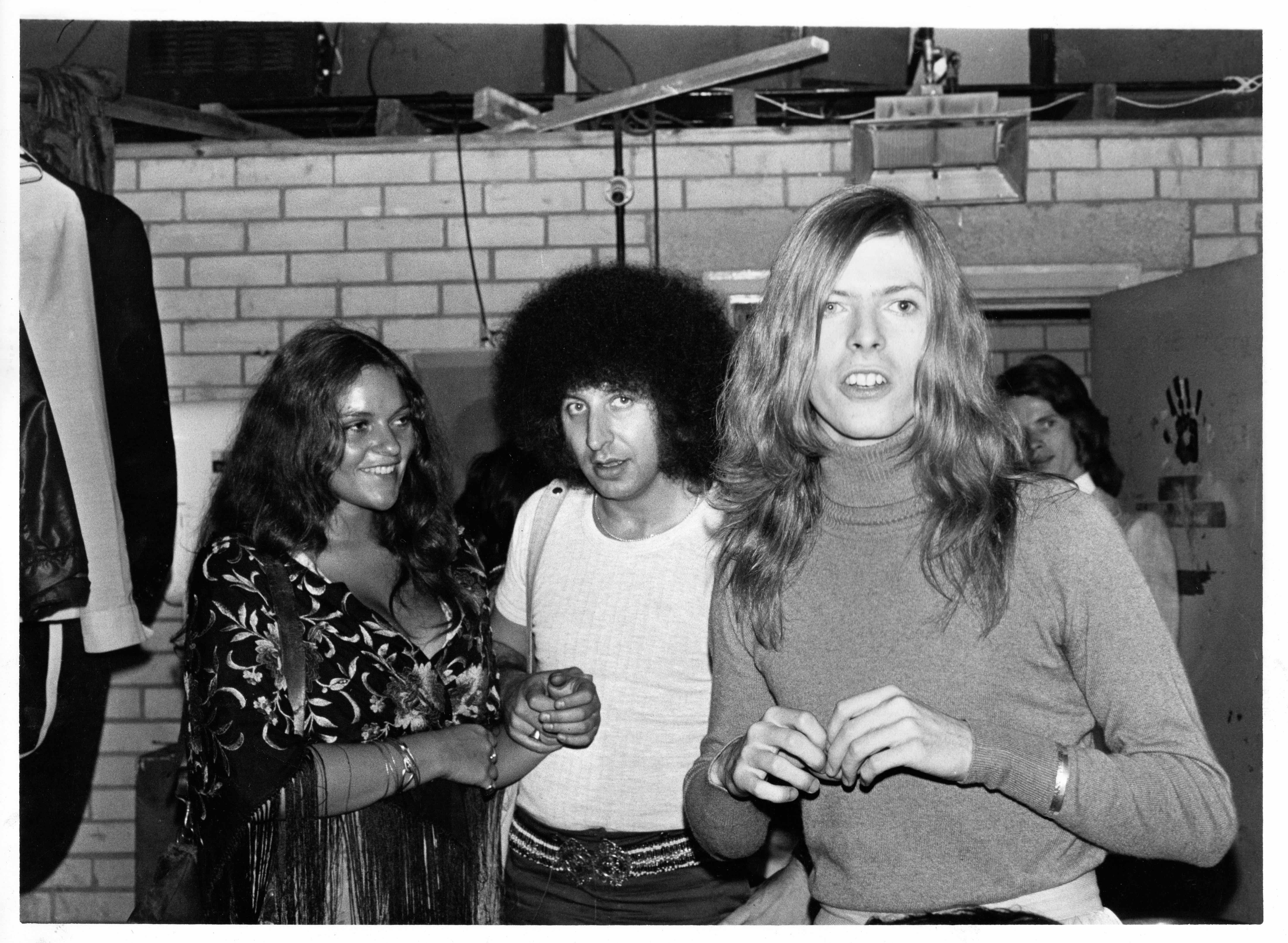
Left to right: Dana Gillespie, Tony Defries and David Bowie at Andy Warhol's Pork at London's Roundhouse in 1971

She is a follower of the late Indian spiritual guru Sri Sathya Sai Baba. She performed at his Indian ashram on various occasions and has also recorded thirteen bhajan-based albums in Sanskrit.

Gillespie is the organiser of the annual blues festival at Basil's Bar on Mustique in the Caribbean, for 15 days at the end of January and it is now in its 18th year.

From March 2021 on, she had an interview and music podcast series, Globetrotting with Gillespie.

In 2024, Gillespie was one of four artists competing in a special selection for the final of Una voce per San Marino 2024, the Sammarinese national final for the Eurovision Song Contest 2024, with the song "The Last Polar Bear". She was ultimately selected for the final.

In August 2024, she was interviewed by The Times, where she described her life, her relationship with David Bowie and her South Kensington home, where she has lived all her life.

== Selected discography ==
- Foolish Seasons (London, PS 540, October 1968)
- Box of Surprises (Decca, SKL 5012, 1969)
- Jesus Christ Superstar (Original London Cast Recording) (MCA, 1973)
- Weren't Born a Man (RCA, 1973)
- Ain't Gonna Play No Second Fiddle (RCA, 1974)
- Mojo Blues Band and the Rockin' Boogie Flu (Bellaphon, 1981)
- Blue Job (Ace, 1982)
- Solid Romance (Bellaphon, 1984)
- Below the Belt (Ace, 1984)
- It Belongs to Me (Bellaphon, 1985)
- I'm a Woman (The Blues Line) (Bellaphon, 1986)
- Move Your Body Close to Me (Bellaphon, 1986)
- Hot News (Gig, 1987)
- Sweet Meat (Blue Horizons, 1989)
- Amor (Gig, 1989)
- Blues It Up (Ace, 1990)
- Left Hand Roller with Pewny Michael, (Bellaphon Records and Susy Records, 1990)
- Where Blue Begins (Ariola, 1991)
- Boogie Woogie Nights (with Joachim Palden) (Wolf, 1991)
- Big Boy (with Joachim Palden) (Wolf, 1992)
- Methods of Release (Bellaphon, 1993)
- Andy Warhol (Trident, 1994)
- Blue One (Wolf, 1994)
- Hot Stuff (Ace, 1995)
- Have I Got Blues For You (Wolf, 1996)
- Mustique Blues Festival (yearly since 1996)
- Cherry Pie (with Big Jay McNeely) (Big Jay Records, 1997)
- One to One, Inner View, Dream On (under the pseudonym of Third Man) (1998)
- Back to the Blues (Wolf, 1998)
- Experienced (Ace, 2000)
- Staying Power (Ace, 2003)
- Sing Out (with Shanthi Sisters) (2004)
- Sacred Space (2005)
- Live (with the London Blues Band) (Ace, 2007)
- Eternally Yours (2009)
- Mata Mata (2011)
- I Rest My Case (Ace, 2013)
- Cats Meow (Ace, 2014)
- Dana Gillespie meets Al Cook – Take It Off Slowly (Wolf, 2018)
- Under My Bed (Ace, 2019)
- Deep Pockets (Ace, 2021)
- First Love (Fretsore Records, 2024)

== Filmography ==
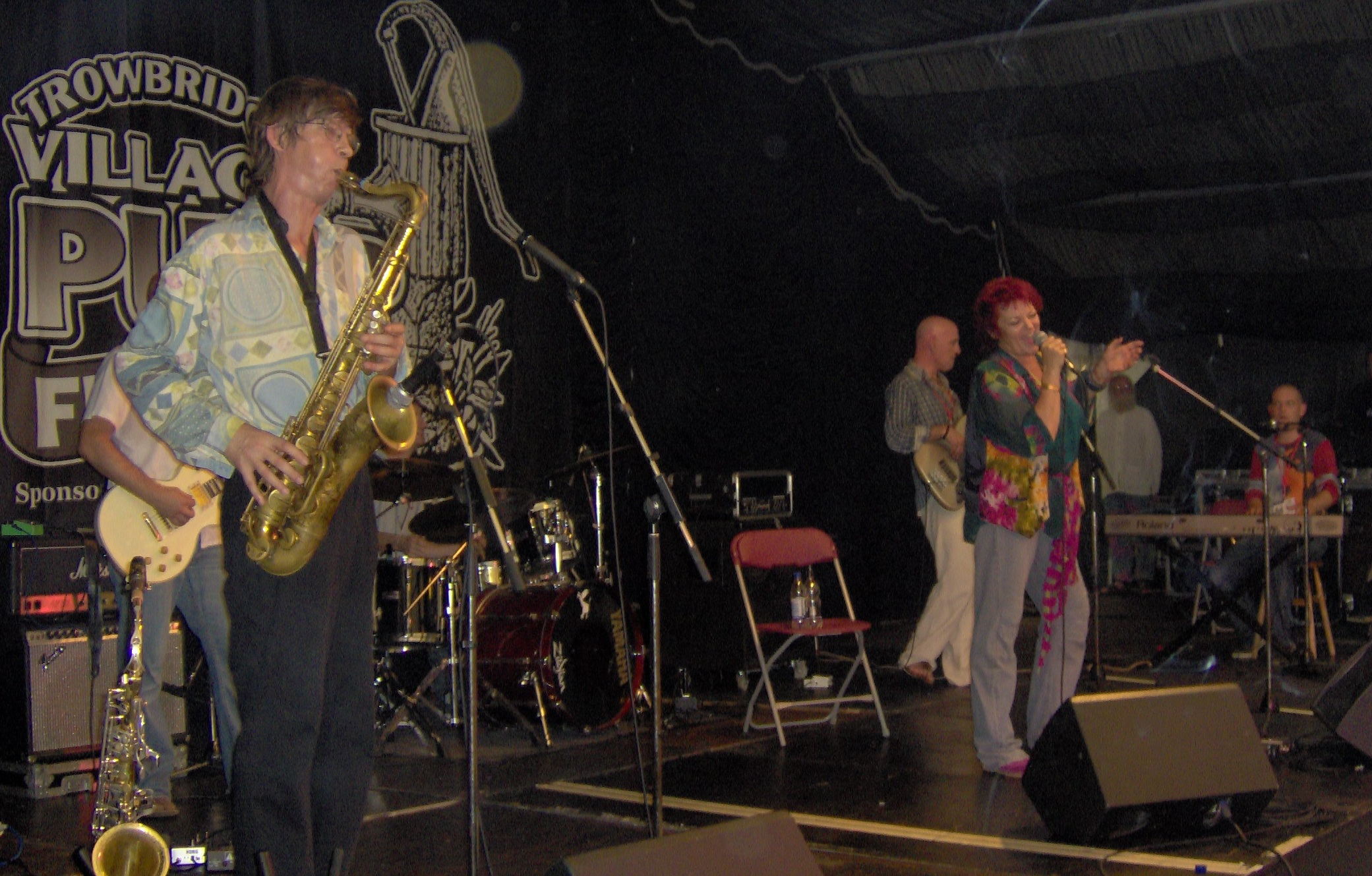
Dana Gillespie and the London Blues Band, at the 2006 Trowbridge Village Pump Festival

- Fumo di Londra (1966)
- Secrets of a Windmill Girl (1966) - Singer
- The Vengeance of She (1968) - Girl at Party (uncredited)
- The Lost Continent (1968) - Sarah
- Mahler (1974) - Anna von Mildenburg
- The People That Time Forgot (1977) - Ajor
- The Hound of the Baskervilles (1978) - Mary Frankland
- Bad Timing (1980) - Amy Miller
- Scrubbers (1982) - Budd
- Parker (1986) - Monika
- Sterben werd ich um zu leben - Gustav Mahler (1987) - Anna von Mildenburg
- Strapless (1989) - Julie Kovago
- Sunday Pursuit (1990) - Maureen (final film role)
- David Bowie: Finding Fame (2019) – appeared as herself
- Hotel India (2014) - Herself

== See also ==
- List of British actors

== Bibliography ==
- Bowie, Angela, Backstage Passes, Jove Books, Berkeley Publishing Group (1993)
- Gillespie, Dana, Weren't Born a Man, Hawksmoor Publishing (2020)
