= Cyrinda Foxe =

American actress

- Born: Kathleen Victoria Hetzekian; February 22, 1952; Santa Monica, California, U.S.
- Died: September 7, 2002 (aged 50); New York City, U.S.
- Other name: Cyrinda Foxe-Tyler
- Occupations: Actress; model; publicist
- Spouses: David Johansen (m. 1977; div. 1978) Steven Tyler (m. 1978; div. 1987) Keith Waa (m. 2002)
- Children: Mia Tyler

Cyrinda Foxe (born Kathleen Victoria Hetzekian; February 22, 1952 – September 7, 2002) was an American actress, model, and publicist. Foxe is best known for being a Warhol superstar, appearing in the play Andy Warhol's Pork (1971) and the film Andy Warhol's Bad (1977). She was also the inspiration for the song "The Jean Genie" by glam rock musician David Bowie. Foxe was married to David Johansen of the proto-punk band New York Dolls and Steven Tyler of the hard rock band Aerosmith. Her daughter is model and actress Mia Tyler.

== Early life ==
Cyrinda Foxe was born Kathleen Victoria Hetzekian in Santa Monica, California, to an Armenian family. She grew up as an army brat in an abusive household. As an only child, she lived on an army base with her parents in the Philippines before her family moved to Altus, Oklahoma.

She went to Texas as a teenager with a pack of motorcyclists, where she was injured in a gunfight. When she returned to Oklahoma, she asked her mother if she could move to New York City, and was given the bus fare.

== Career ==
She started working for art dealer Sam Green within the first month of her arrival in New York. She changed her name to Cyrinda Foxe, went blonde, and had a boyfriend who made her 1950s style dresses.

Foxe began frequenting Max's Kansas City, a popular Manhattan nightclub, and soon became part of pop artist Andy Warhol's circle. She landed a role in Warhol's play, Andy Warhol's Pork. The production debuted in May 1971, for a two-week run at the La MaMa Experimental Theatre in New York City, before moving to London's Roundhouse for a six-week performance in August 1971.

Foxe became a favorite of the Warhol set. In 1972, she was given a full-page spread in Life magazine for her vintage style. In his memoir, Arthur Kane characterized Foxe as being "bright [and] very magnetic" and having "an effervescence about her" as "[she was] very much a character of her own creation."

English musician David Bowie and his wife, Angela Bowie, became infatuated with Foxe when they arrived in New York to start their first American tour. While working under Tony Defries as a publicist for MainMan, Foxe appeared in the music video for Bowie's 1972 single, "The Jean Genie". Bowie wanted the video to depict "Ziggy as a kind of Hollywood street-rat" with a "consort of the Marilyn brand". This led to Foxe's casting, and she flew from New York to San Francisco especially for the shoot. Bowie said of the song "I wrote it for her amusement in her apartment. Sexy girl." Foxe records in her memoir that Bowie said to her "I want to write you a song. What do you want?", to which Foxe replied "something like the Yardbirds".

In 1975, Foxe interviewed musician Rick Derringer and his wife, Liz Derringer, for Warhol's Interview magazine.

Fox appeared in the Warhol-produced film Andy Warhol's Bad (1977), directed by Jed Johnson.

In 1997, Foxe's memoir, Dream On: Livin' on the Edge with Steven Tyler and Aerosmith, co-written with Danny Fields, was published. Not long after the book was released, Foxe announced that the paperback edition of Dream On would include nude photos of her former husband Steven Tyler, but Tyler won a lawsuit in 1999, preventing Foxe from publishing the photos. In 2000, she launched a website in which she was selling nude pictures of Tyler, but the site closed by the end of the year.

== Personal life ==
Foxe had an affair with musician David Bowie in the early 1970s. Foxe in later years maintained a fondness for Bowie, referring to him as a "great lover" and stating that she "really cherish[ed her] time" with him.

Foxe was involved with guitarist James Williamson of The Stooges while living in Hollywood.

Foxe met David Johansen, lead singer of the New York Dolls, in the back room at Max's Kansas City in New York. They began dating, they married in 1977.

After less than a year of marriage to Johansen, she began dating Aerosmith frontman Steven Tyler. In 1978, Foxe and Tyler married and had a daughter, Mia. The couple divorced in 1987.

When Foxe became ill in later years, Tyler agreed to pay for a room for her at the Gramercy Park Hotel where she married musician Keith Waa on August 28, 2002.

== Illness and death ==
In 2001, Foxe had a mild stroke. She received Medicaid and food stamps, but she had no apartment or place to live. Myra Freidman organized a benefit at CBGB to raise money for Foxe. Her former husband, Steven Tyler, who also paid her hospital bills, donated a signed Aerosmith guitar to the benefit, which sold for $5000. Her former lover David Bowie also donated an acoustic guitar.

Foxe died at age 50 from an inoperable brain tumor on September 7, 2002.
