= Andy Warhol's Pork =

1971 stage play by Andy Warhol

Pork
- Based on: Andy Warhol's tape-recorded conversations

Premiere
- Date: May 5, 1971
- Place: La MaMa Experimental Theatre; New York City
- Directed by: Anthony Ingrassia

Andy Warhol's Pork, also known as Pork, is a 1971 play by American artist Andy Warhol. It's based on tape-recorded conversations between Warhol and members of his circle, including Brigid Polk and Viva. Directed by Anthony Ingrassia, the play dramatizes episodes and conversations drawn from Warhol's personal and social life. Pork premiered in New York in May 1971 and subsequently transferred to London. The play's explicit sexual and scatological content attracted considerable media attention, with contemporary reviews ranging from praise for its depiction of the Warhol milieu to criticism of its voyeuristic and provocative qualities.

== Background ==
Pork was based on tape-recorded conversations between Pop artist Andy Warhol and his superstars Brigid Polk and Viva. Warhol became interested in adapting the material for the stage after Polk played him recordings of telephone conversations between herself and her mother, socialite Honey Berlin.

The play, which ostensibly depicted incidents from Warhol's personal life, was initially written to run for approximately 10½ hours. Director Anthony Ingrassia persuaded Warhol to shorten it substantially. Warhol supplied approximately 200 hours of recorded material, which was edited into a three-hour play. Ingrassia recalled that the first act took two weeks to complete and the second approximately two and a half weeks. "Near the end of that time, I discovered that though the play was about Pork, it was B. Marlowe (based on Andy himself) who controlled Pork and all the rest of them … And that was the genius of Andy Warhol. He listened and looked, and he painted what was familiar to all of us", Ingrassia said.

== Plot ==
B. Marlowe, a deadpan voyeur who always has a Polaroid camera on hand, is the charismatic head of the group. Two antagonistic sidekicks are playing up to him: Amanda Pork, a plump overachiever involved in drugs and sex, and Vulva, a caustic, boisterous vamp in drag with a Southern accent. Pork is estranged from her husband and attended by the Pepsodent twins, two nude men with pastel powdered genitals. A sly topless dancer named Josie discusses her clients while "douching" with her back to the audience. Marlowe is chauffeured around in a wheelchair, snapping photos and listening to gossip. The set is a combination of Marlowe's studio, Amanda Pork's bedroom and Max's Kansas City.

== Cast ==
The New York production featured Cleve Roller as Amanda Pork, a character based on Brigid Polk, and Tony Zanetta as B. Marlowe, a character based on Andy Warhol. Wayne County (later known as Jayne County) played Vulva, a character based on Viva. The Pepsodent Twins were based on Warhol's boyfriend Jed Johnson and his twin brother, Jay Johnson. Geri Miller played Josie, a topless dancer based on herself, while Via Valentina and Cyrinda Foxe played two S&M girls.

In the London production, Kathy Dorrite, also known as Cherry Vanilla, played Amanda Pork. Other cast members included Jamie de Carlo Lotts, Julia Breck, Suzanne Smith, and Harvey Fierstein.

== Production history ==
The play opened on May 5, 1971, at La MaMa Experimental Theatre in New York City for a two-week run. It was brought to the Roundhouse in London for a six-week run in August 1971. The play was directed by Anthony J. Ingrassia, produced by Ira Gale, and stage-managed by Leee Black Childers.

The production was controversial due to the nudity and simulated sexual acts performed on stage. In London, Warhol superstar Geri Miller caused a scandal when she was arrested for exposing her breast during a photo session in front of Clarence House, the residence of the Queen Mother.

== Critical reception ==
Pork received mixed reviews from critics. Reviewing the play for The New York Times, journalist Grace Glueck described its characters as "a cozy bunch," adding "take out the fornication, masturbation, defecation and prevarication with which Pork is larded and you might have a certain similarity to the juvenile gang in You're a Good Man, Charlie Brown." Dick Brukenfeld of The Village Voice characterized Pork as a "brave if shallow self-portrait" of Warhol and a depiction of the "sub-sub-culture which exists and which Warhol helps to maintain." He noted that the play turned its audience into voyeurs, writing that "the voyeur's bargain excludes compassion and perception."

The British press was largely negative toward the play, however, Nicholas de Jongh of The Guardian highlighted its "exuberant and accurate caricature of sexuality" and argued that, for both its treatment of sexuality and its larger purposes, the play "must be seen." Valerie Jenkins of the Evening Standard similarly found that "Pork's redeeming essence is that it finds itself so ridiculous; from start to finish it demands not to be taken seriously; it's Warhol people debunking themselves." Keith Nurse of The Daily Telegraph described Pork as "the nearest thing to a theatrical emetic … It's a sort of avant-garde candid camera which takes a venereal and bizarre look at the backside of life. And the net effect is more purgative than funny; inescapably boring rather than titillating."

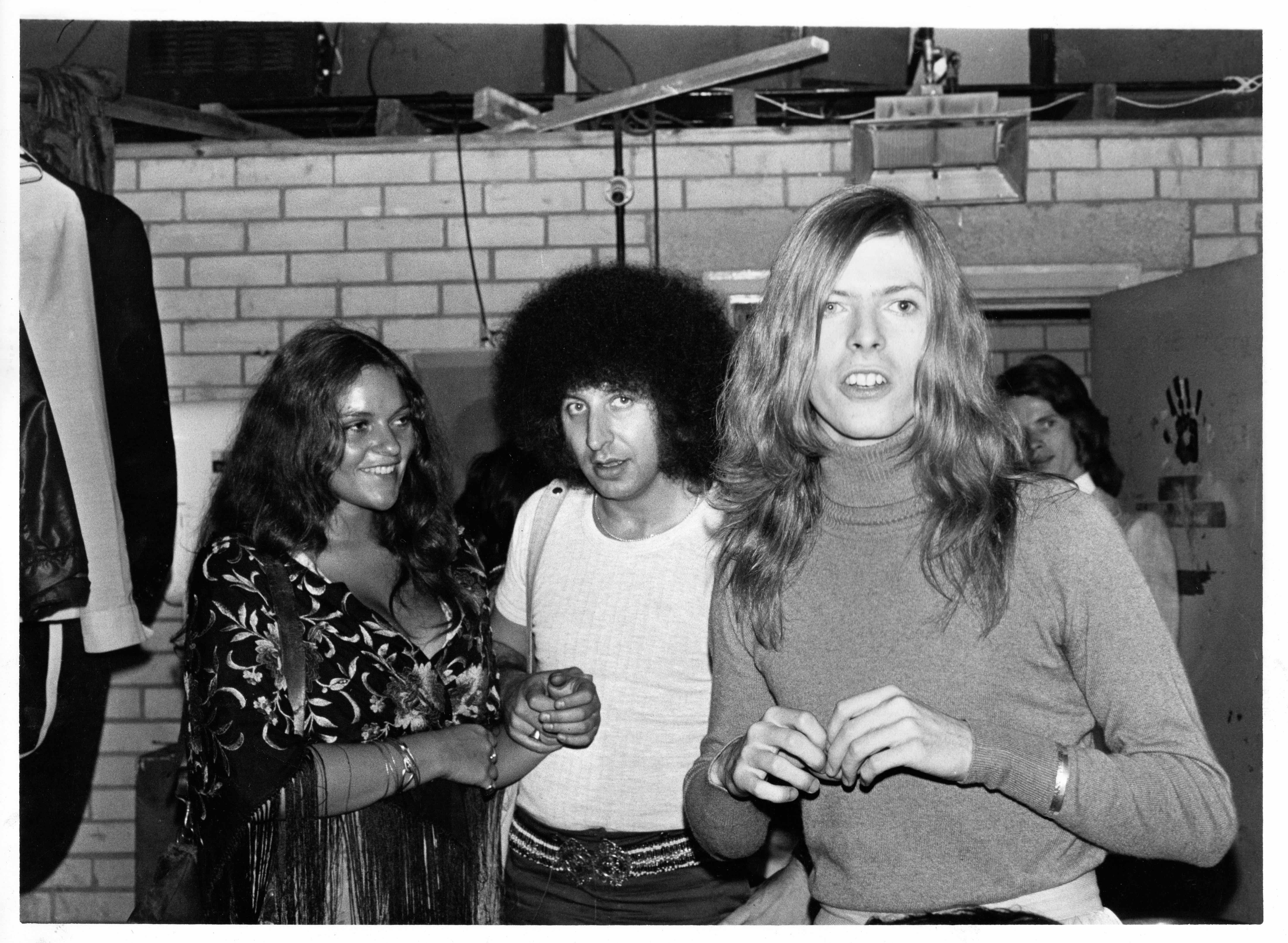
Dana Gillespie, Tony Defries, and David Bowie at the London production of Pork, 1971.

Writing in After Dark, Peter Buckley praised the London production of Pork, calling it the "nice surprise" for its visual appeal, professional performances, humor, and humanity. He praised Ingrassia's direction for giving the production a lively pace and brightness "usually associates more with The Open Theatre than the Factory." He also singled out Geri Miller, "who with her twisting tits and vibrators, almost walks away with the show. A delightful bonus."

Roger Finborough of Penthouse observed that "in its dialogue Pork contrives to present sex, not as the joyful and uplifting experience it is but as something obscene." He also applauded Miller's performance for providing moments of humor and relief, but concluded that the production ultimately returned to the "Black Warhol of Calcutta, groping our way through gabbled profanities and hypnotizing juvenilia."

Musician David Bowie was a fan of Warhol and said that the London production of Pork influenced him. Bowie's manager Tony Defries recruited cast members Cherry Vanilla and Tony Zanetta, and stage manager Leee Black Childers to work for the New York offices of his management company MainMan. In a 1974 interview with William S. Burroughs published in Rolling Stone, Bowie expressed an interest in adapting Pork for television:

Remember Pork? I want to get that on TV. TV has eaten up everything else, and Warhol films are all that is left, which is fabulous. Pork could become the next I Love Lucy, the great American domestic comedy. It's about how people really live, not like Lucy, who never touched dishwater. It's about people living and hustling to survive. That's what Pork is all about. A smashing of the spectacle.
