= Brunswick Hospital Center =

Geography
- Location: Amityville, New York, United States
- Coordinates: 40°41′5.2″N 73°25′16.6″W

Organization
- Type: Specialized

Services
- Beds: 146

History
- Opened: 1900s (early)

Links
- Website: www.brunswickhospitalcenter.org
- Lists: Hospitals in New York State

Brunswick Hospital Center or Brunswick Hall Psychiatric Hospital is a psychiatric hospital in Amityville, New York. The American Hospital Directory reported that there were 146 staffed beds in the hospital in 2021.

== History ==
The hospital center opened as a private facility in 1887 and was later named Brunswick Hospital Center. It was privately owned by the family of Benjamin Stein, a radiologist who took it over in the early 1950s.

The Brunswick Medical Center opened in 1978 and after a string of financial troubles, was turned over to Suffolk County, NY. In 2005, the hospital closed its doors and was later demolished in 2012.

The psychiatric division, Brunswick Hall Psychiatric Hospital, was reopened prior to the pandemic and remains in operation today.
