= Tony Defries =

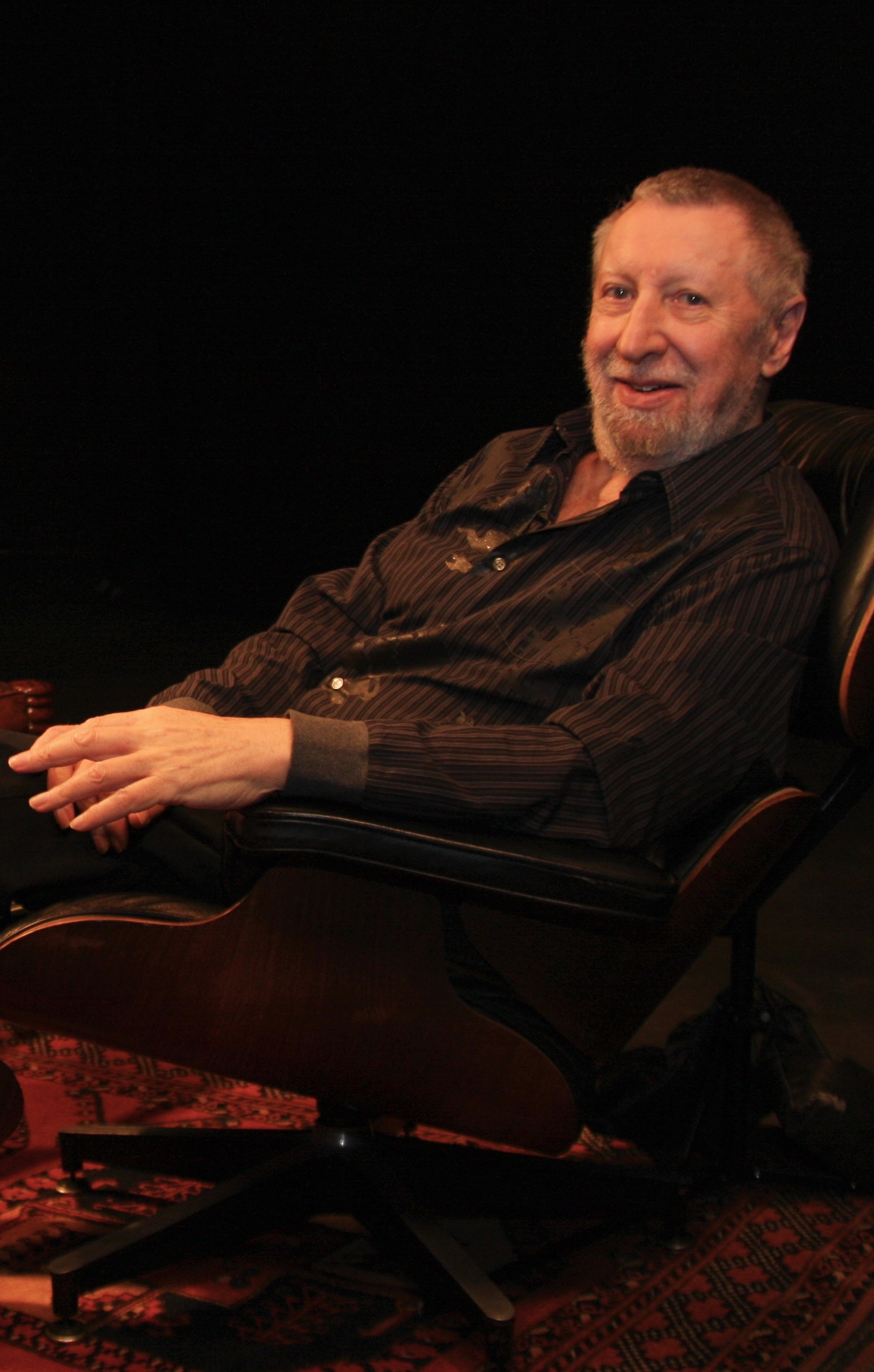
- Defries in 2017

Background information
- Born: Anthony Defries; 3 September 1943 (age 83)
- Origin: Watford, England
- Occupations: Former legal executive; music manager; impresario; technologist; material science; quantum physics researcher; developer
- Years active: 1960–present
- Website: mainmanlabel.com

Anthony Defries (born 3 September 1943) is a British former music manager and impresario. He managed David Bowie's career during his elevation to global stardom, but later fell out with him in a contract dispute. He established a rights management organisation called MainMan and helped launch the careers of Iggy Pop, Mick Ronson, Mott the Hoople, Dana Gillespie, Lou Reed, Luther Vandross and John Cougar Mellencamp. Defries and MainMan have received multiple awards for their achievements in the music industry.

== Early life ==
One of four children born to Edward and Lily Defries, the family had a second-hand and antique business close to Shepherd's Bush Market. In 1944, children were being evacuated from London to escape the V-1 flying bombs. Defries was too young to be evacuated as his mother had two young children and was expecting another, so he was placed into foster care and returned to the family after the war. He suffered from severe asthma and attended a school for children with special needs.

== Career ==
=== Early career and GEM Music Group ===
Defries started his career at the age of 16 in a number of junior positions at various firms of solicitors. While he was a legal executive at the lawfirm of Martin Boston & Co. in Wigmore Street, London he advised Mickie Most in a dispute involving The Animals in 1964. For some years after that he worked with Most, advising him and later working with Allen Klein on his behalf and helping Mickie set up his own independent label Rak Records, and music publishing Rak Publishing. Defries learnt about bargaining techniques, the intricacies of master recording ownership and how to squeeze the best from every deal from Klein. Because of his dealings with Most and his problem-solving abilities, he was approached by his future business partner, Laurence Myers, whose accounting firm were handling Most's accounts at the time. Myers said "Tony was a visionary. I remember him telling me many, many, many years ago that one day everyone at home will have a laptop computer".

Defries later worked with photographers to resolve their copyright and other issues, starting with Don Silverstein, an American photographer living and working in London, who had taken photographs of Jimi Hendrix. These images were being used without his permission and Defries helped him retain the rights to his images and the related revenue. Through Silverstein, Defries was approached by other photographers such as Brian Duffy, David Bailey, Terence Donovan and Antony Armstrong-Jones. To best assist them, and future photographers, he helped found the Association of Fashion and Advertising Photographers (AFAP), in 1968, which later became the Association of Photographers (AOP). Defries would later commission Brian Duffy to photograph and design the cover of Bowie's Aladdin Sane, and Terry O'Neill to shoot the Diamond Dogs album cover. In addition MainMan commissioned rock artist Guy Peellaert to provide futuristic paintings which were ultimately used for that album.

Defries and Myers worked with songwriters, composers, performers and producers, including Mike Leander, Geoff Stephens, Peter Eden, Barry Mason, Roger Cook, Mike D'abo, Donovan, Roger Greenaway, Lionel Bart, Neville Nixon, Ossie Byrne and Tony Macaulay. Defries was responsible for proposing and overseeing legal proceedings for Tony Macaulay in what became a landmark case against his publishers, Schroeder Music, to recover his copyrights. The case of Schroeder Music Publishing vs Macaulay was resolved in Macaulay's favour in the House of Lords, setting a precedent used by many other songwriters to gain better terms.

In 1969, Defries and Myers formed the GEM Music Group, an independent music label, music publishing, rights management and personal management company. GEM's first release, on Bell Records, was "Love Grows (Where my Rosemary Goes)" performed by Edison Lighthouse, and written and produced by Tony Macaulay. It reached number one on the UK Singles Chart in 1970.

In 1970, Olav Wyper, the head of Philips UK, recommended Defries to Bowie who was dissatisfied with his manager Ken Pitt and needed help. Defries realised Bowie's potential and Myers has said "Tony had the vision. His great ability was, far more than I did, he knew what a star David was going to be". Defries had a reputation for renegotiating contracts and proceeded to extract Bowie from all his existing contracts: management, recording (Mercury) and publishing (Essex Music). GEM signed an exclusive contract with Bowie in 1970 and when the Mercury contract was terminated in 1971, Defries was free to sign a record deal with RCA. Defries would go on to sign Iggy Pop, Dana Gillespie and Mick Ronson with GEM.

In 1971, Defries had decided that breaking Bowie in the US would require a permanent corporate presence and suggested to Myers that they open offices in New York. By that time, GEM had established a significant position in the UK industry and Myers was uncomfortable about risking that base in a new US venture. As a result, Defries and Myers discussed a division of the various talent GEM represented and reached a settlement which would allow Defries to keep certain artists while the rest remained with GEM. They signed an agreement where Defries would take David Bowie, Iggy Pop, Mott the Hoople, Dana Gillespie and Mick Ronson in return for a financial settlement.

=== MainMan Group of Companies ===
Defries formed the MainMan Group of Companies in 1972, with offices in New York, London and Tokyo. These companies had a management structure that combined ingredients of the movie studio with those of the independent producer, record label, music publisher and management. The original MainMan team was made up of members from Andy Warhol’s The Factory and his now-famous production of his play, Pork. The company’s management included Cherry Vanilla, Tony Zanetta and Jamie Andrews.

Defries had a zero-tolerance drug policy and no unauthorised press access policy. As a strategy to control the narrative and create demand, all access public and press was denied. This was based on protocols used by the movie studios in the 1950s to make their stars famous. MainMan had their own in-house photographers, Mick Rock and Leee Black Childers, and forbade all other unauthorised photographers.

A key part of Defries’ strategy with MainMan was to control the creative process of Bowie's next album, Hunky Dory, by funding it independently, before approaching RCA. This gave Bowie creative freedom, without being forced to fit into any traditional record company genres and co-ownership of his music copyrights. Tony Zanetta (President of MainMan, USA) said "Tony threw the book out the window. He loved to take huge gambles…"

After Lou Reed’s disastrous first solo album for RCA, MainMan arranged for Bowie and Mick Ronson to produce his follow-up album, Transformer. Bowie and Defries invited Reed to make his first UK appearance as a surprise guest at a 'Friends of the Earth, Save the Whale Benefit Concert' with Bowie and The Spiders from Mars at the Royal Festival Hall on July 8, 1972. This concert took place just two days after Bowie's performance of "Starman" on Top of the Pops.

With Bowie on the brink of stardom (Ziggy Stardust hit No. 5 and Hunky Dory #3 on the UK charts and hundreds of Ziggy clones attended his concerts), Defries informed his staff "As far as RCA in America are concerned, the young man with red hair sitting at the end of this table is the biggest thing to come out of England since the Beatles. And if we get this right there’s every possibility we will be as big as the Beatles, if not bigger". Defries arranged to fly over American journalists to see Bowie live in preparation for his upcoming US tour.

Defries instructed Tony Zanetta to set up the MainMan office in an Upper East Side New York apartment and he employed a cavalcade of exotic characters. The first North American concert date was September 22, in Cleveland for an audience of three thousand and the tour ended December 2 at Tower Theatre, Pennsylvania. After that first concert Defries had promised they would come back to play Cleveland in a bigger venue holding ten thousand people and that is exactly what they did.

MainMan artists were among the best rock 'n rollers of their time, and the company's culture was to treat all their artists as equals and to ensure that all their needs were met. A lot of cash was spent as the artists had a high burn rate. Bowie was doing very well, but "not selling anywhere near a Rolling Stones or Elton John-like level until 1975".

Defries saw Mick Ronson as an extraordinary musical talent and believed he could have a solo career and together they devised a course to stardom, starting with concerts at the Rainbow Theatre. According to Ronson "the question of whether those Rainbow concerts were good ones or bad is beside the point. The fact that I managed to sell the place out two nights running must mean that people thought I was worth seeing". Ronson's production and arrangements of notable albums such as Hunky Dory, Ziggy Stardust and Aladdin Sane showed his skills in the studio and in live playing. "Ronson made David Bowie’s new music bigger, tougher and sexier. He was the muscle in the mix," Bowie recalled, "Mick was the perfect foil for the Ziggy character, Ziggy and Mick were the personification of the rock & roll dualism". Ronson, who wrote the string arrangements for both Bowie's "Life on Mars?" and Lou Reed's "Perfect Day". John Mellencamp also said that Ronson helped save and arrange "Jack & Diane".

=== Bowie / Defries ===
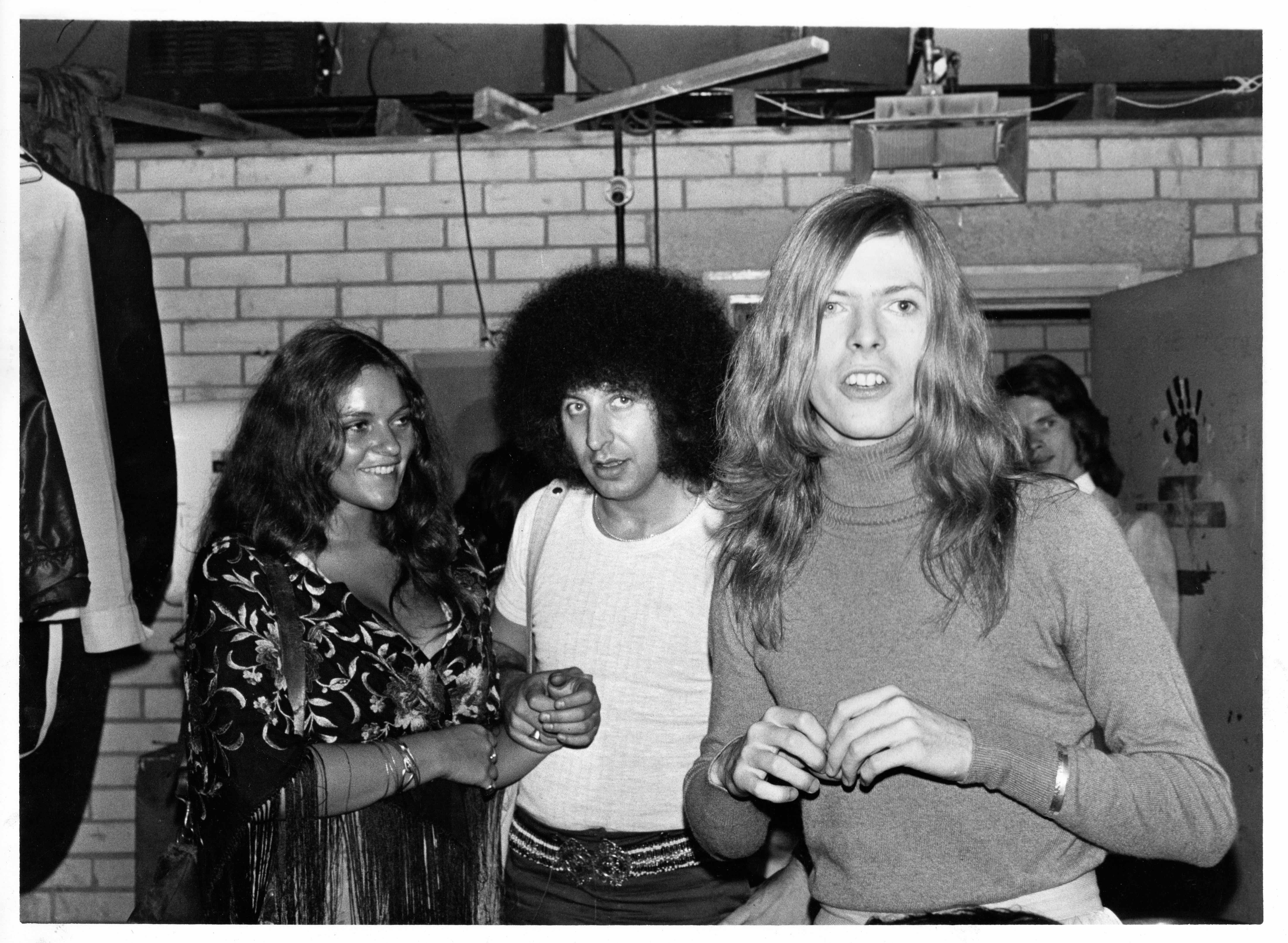
Left to right: Dana Gillespie, Tony Defries and David Bowie at Andy Warhol's Pork at London's Roundhouse in 1971.

At the start of their relationship, Bowie and Defries became very close friends. Bowie described their relationship as a "marriage-made-in-heaven" and said they were "very, very strong buddies", even though he understood that if they had no business together, they probably wouldn't see each other. Defries believed that David Bowie was going to be a superstar and should be marketed under a brand name "Bowie". Defries' determination and talent for promotion were a major contribution to Bowie's success.

Towards the end of 1973, and after a successful world tour, Bowie was living in London and Defries in New York. Bowie saw many musicians, producers and girlfriends come and go from his life, but Defries’ oversight remained constant. "It could be anything: business, what people see, girlfriends, Tony would orchestrate it all," said Ava Cherry. On top of the distance between them, their friendship began to deteriorate as Bowie developed a cocaine habit. Defries’ no tolerance to drugs policy and Bowie's increase in drug use created strain and estrangement between them.

The employment contract between MainMan and Bowie shared Bowie's net royalties fifty-fifty. Although Bowie later came to resent the royalty split, "Defries helped make one key business decision that played a large role in allowing Bowie to take charge of his career: He negotiated the singer's 1970s RCA deals so the two would own the recording copyrights, a provision almost unheard of at the time. At the time, no one knew how valuable the rights to recordings would become -- or how important Bowie’s would be. According to Billboard's estimates, his recordings and publishing rights are now worth about $100 million -- and likely even more".

Bowie's increasing addiction to cocaine made him paranoid and suspicious, and in the end Defries and Bowie could no longer work together. A settlement was agreed in 1975 between RCA, Bowie, MainMan and Defries. Defries gave up personal management but retained a shared control of other aspects of Bowie's catalog and career that Bowie resented.

As Bowie and Defries co-owned the rights to everything they published and recorded together, Bowie later required a large cash injection to buy Defries out. David Pullman came up with the idea of securitising the intellectual property against future earnings. Resentment by Bowie against his former friend lingered, so Pullman dealt with Bowie and Defries separately. In an interview later Pullman said "It’s like a marriage. The flipside is Tony is very savvy. I didn’t realize he’s an attorney, not just a manager. Tony didn’t have anything to say about David. They helped each other early on. Tony taught him some of the things he learned along the way about owning things." In 1997 the Bowie Bonds began as a stock of $55 million and appeared on the cover of the Wall Street Journal.

In 2011 Defries was sued by Capitol Records for copyright infringement over misuse of Bowie material. He lost the lawsuit with damages and costs against him exceeding US$9 million.

"In the early days," Bowie said in 2003, "all the greats like Mick Jagger and John Lennon were forever telling me the same thing: don't have anything to do with managers. They were always very adamant about that and, in hindsight, it was good advice. But it was usually just after I'd signed a contract with another one."

== Later career ==
In 1991, he founded IOTA Inc, a private technology research company which worked with major universities and government agencies on a range of communications and other technologies, securing a number of patents. Defries worked with Oxford University Communications Engineering Department and leading UK optical / photonic companies and research groups on the design and development of optical wireless technology.

In 2005 Defries founded Matter Inc, a Caltech/Stanford startup for plasmonic research and development with scientists from Stanford, California Institute of Technology and New York University to work on materials science, nanophotonics and energy related projects.

== Personal life ==
In 1975, his long-term girlfriend, Melanie McDonald, gave birth to his first daughter, Fleur Dominique Defries. He then married Marlene Weir in London, in 1986, and their daughter Tatiana Alexandra Defries was born in 1988.

== Sources ==
- Cann, Kevin; Duffy, Chris (2014). Duffy Bowie: Five Sessions. Woodbridge: ACC Editions. ISBN 978-1-85149-765-2.
- Jones, Dylan (2018). David Bowie: The Oral History. New York: Three Rivers Press. ISBN 978-0-451-49784-0. (Kindle edition ISBN 978-0-451-49785-7)
- Spitz, Marc (2009). Bowie: A Biography. New York: Crown Publishers. ISBN 978-0-307-46239-8.
- Trynka, Paul (2011). David Bowie: Starman. New York: Little Brown & Company. ISBN 978-0-316-13424-8.
