= Decora (rapper) =

American rapper

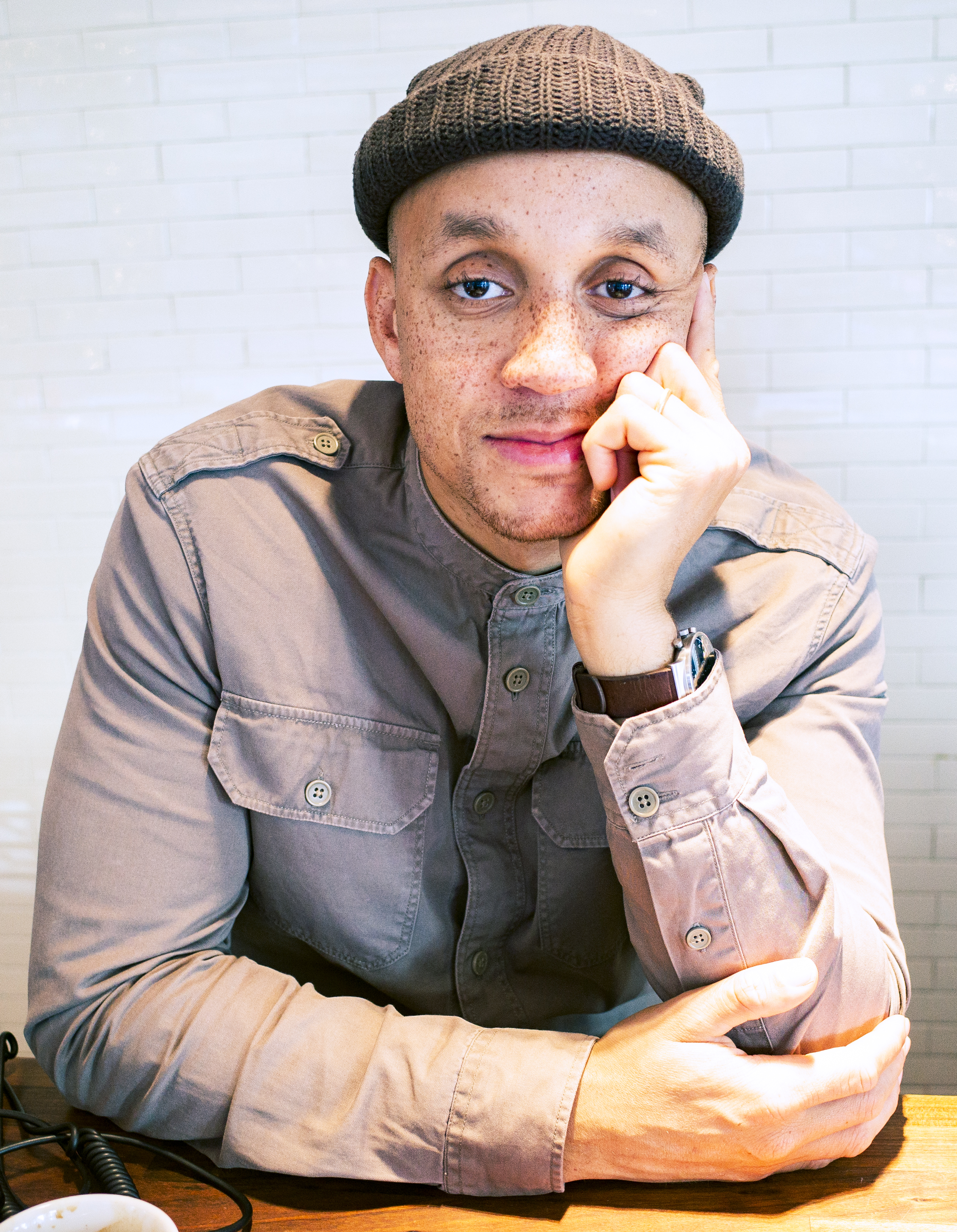

Background information
- Born: Lloyd Gregory Sandiford; January 4, 1984 (age 42); Texas
- Origin: Hudson Valley, New York
- Genres: hip hop, spoken word, Alternative R&B
- Occupations: Hip hop artist, producer, performance poet, activist
- Instrument: Vocals
- Years active: 2002-present
- Formerly of: The Readnex Poetry Squad
- Website: iamdecora.com

Lloyd Gregory Sandiford (born January 4, 1984), known professionally as Decora, is an American AfroLatinX hip hop artist, producer, performance poet and social activist based in the Hudson Valley of New York.

Decora initially gained notable recognition as a member of the socially-conscious hip hop group, The Readnex Poetry Squad. While touring nationally and abroad, he and the group developed the “Hip Hop and Poetry Saved My Life” workshop aimed toward at-risk youth. In 2009, the group was one of the first hip-hop acts to perform at the Clearwater Festival which helped to secure Decora's place on Hudson Valley's list of People to Watch in 2012. Decora launched his solo career in 2015 with his debut album Bread and Oats. He released his second album, Beyond Belief, with a concert at Lincoln Center in February 2017, and released his third album Reverie in 2018. In 2019, Decora released new music every month, in the form of EPs, singles, and a full-length instrumental album.

== Early life ==
Decora was born Lloyd Gregory Sandiford on January 4, 1984, in Texas. He shares a name with his great-uncle, Sir Lloyd Erskine Sandiford, the fourth Prime Minister of Barbados from 1987 to 1994. Decora's nickname was bestowed on him by his grandmother, a variant on the Puerto Rican phrase de corazon, “of the heart.” Decora and his father moved to Brownsville, Brooklyn in 1985 at the age of 2. In the fourth grade, Decora moved with his father to Delhi, New York, where his father returned to college to study engineering. It was around this time that Decora began writing poems to cope with his transient family life. When he was 14, Decora's family moved to Puerto Rico after the death of his grandfather to care for his grandmother. Eventually, Decora landed stateside again in The Bronx. He attended City-As-School High School in the West Village of Manhattan. He eventually moved to the Hudson Valley in 2001, where he attended SUNY Orange in Middletown, New York.

== Career ==
=== 2002 - 2014: The Readnex Poetry Squad ===
Decora founded and performed as a member of the Hudson Valley-based words-and-music crew, The Readnex Poetry Squad, with other members Jarabe Del Sol, Freeflowin, Latin Translator, and DJ H2O. The group met during a campus open mic night in 2001 while attending SUNY Orange. When asked to define ReadNex's style, Decora said, “There are four elements that make up hip-hop culture: rapping, DJing, breakdancing, and graffiti writing. We’ve added a fifth, ambiguous element, which is more personal and can be anything you want it to be."

The Readnex Poetry Squad, which stands for “Next Poets to be Read About,” began to gain regional and national attention with their 2008 Frontlines Tour, a self-funded expedition that took the group to 40 cities and towns across the U.S. Along with performing on tour, the group held educational workshops at community centers aimed at teaching youth through writing, painting, and dance. Their confidence-building, affirmation-based workshop, “Hip Hop and Poetry Saved My Life,” was picked up by the New York State Education Department and taught throughout New York, and then the country. By 2012, Decora and the group had led more than 200 sessions, initially teaching kids, and then coaching teachers and administrators on how to better communicate with at-risk kids. The workshop has now been taught at 87 schools across the country, as well as abroad. While teaching a workshop at Clearwater in Beacon, NY, in 2009, the group met American folk singer, social activist, Pete Seeger. That year, ReadNex became one of the first hip-hop acts to ever perform at the Clearwater Festival.

Through the course of their active years The ReadNex Poetry Squad maintained an itinerary of educational and advocacy efforts, and also released 3 studio albums through their own Debefore Label.

The ReadNex Poetry Squad Discography
Album	Year released
F.O.S.S.L	2004
Social ISsUe	2008
The Day Before Sound	2010

The last time ReadNex toured was 2012, but the group members continue to find new ways to collaborate. In 2014, Decora and Freeflowin teamed up to open Create Space, a collaborative workspace and art gallery in Newburgh, NY.

=== 2015 - 2016: Solo Debut, Bread and Oats ===
Decora launched his solo career in 2014, with the release of “Flowers,” a single from his debut solo album, Bread and Oats. The tune pays tribute to his late hero and mentor Pete Seeger, referencing the folksinger's classic "Where Have All the Flowers Gone?" in the chorus as the verses outline commentary on current sociological and environmental situations.

The full Bread and Oats album was released in July, 2015. Afropunk reviewed the album, saying it was Decora's “refusal to play by the rules that made Bread and Oats such a compelling record.” In his review of the album, Afropunk contributor Nathan Lee said, “Decora has set a monumental task before himself: to tie together a hundred disparate influences and ideas into one cohesive whole... he does it remarkably on Bread and Oats.” Lee urged readers to “Definitely check this one out.”

Bread and Oats includes two tracks featuring Corey Glover, lead vocalist of Living Color. According to Afropunk, Glover's “mind-expanding contributions” to the album - as heard on “Nantucket” and “Beautiful Bitch” - helped to highlight Decora's commitment to skirting expectations and pushing boundaries. Corey Glover commented on working with Decora, saying “One of the things that strikes me about him as an artist is that he really reflects the total diversity of his environment, not just where he lives but the world as a whole. And sonically the album reflects that as well. It’s all over the place. There are elements of rock, folk, soul, all kinds of stuff.”

Decora performed Bread and Oats with a live band. At the 2015 O+ Festival in Kingston, New York, Chronogram contributor Peter Aaron reported that Decora and his five-piece group brought forth “a funky force that left the thick crowd a whooping mass of ecstatic goo.”

=== 2017 - 2018: Beyond Belief and Reverie ===
Decora released his second album, Beyond Belief, with a concert at Lincoln Center in February, 2017. Five minutes before it began, the space had reached capacity, and by the time Decora grabbed the mic, a line of fans snaked down the street. Decora followed up the release with a total of 94 shows in 2017, touring nationwide and into Canada on bills with headliners like Van Jones, DJ Khaled and T.I., among others.

Decora released his 3rd studio album, Reverie, in June 2018. The music video for the album's single “Can’t Speak” was shown at the Woodstock Film Festival in October, 2019.

In 2018, Decora's song "Mad Random" off the album Bread and Oats (2015) was featured in season 1, episode 1 of She's Gotta Have It, an American comedy-drama television series created by Spike Lee.

=== 2019: An Album Every Month ===
In 2019, Decora issued himself a challenge: release a new album every month. He kicked off the year with a listening party at the World of McIntosh Experience Center, where he celebrated five years as an independent artist and offered listeners a preview of the 12 albums he would be releasing in the coming year.

Decora would go on to achieve his goal, releasing music every month in 2019 in the form of EPs, singles, and a full-length instrumental album. He also performed at shows and festivals throughout the year, including the local Newburgh Illuminated Festival. An estimated 40,000 people attended the 2019 event, which included over 40 bands, 160 street performers, and almost 40 dance troops performing throughout the day.

=== 2021 - 2022: Ink Lloyd Tapes ===
Decora released his fifth full-length album titled Ink Lloyd Tapes on October 1, 2021.

In 2022, Decora's song "I Got the Juice" off the EP Stamina (2019) was featured in season 1, episode 9 of Welcome to Wrexham, an American sports documentary series following the events of Welsh association football club Wrexham A.F.C. as told by the club's owners Rob McElhenney and Ryan Reynolds.

== Artistry ==
Decora describes his music as rap and electronic, and the thread that connects all of his music, he says, is a “message of possibility.” He cites A Tribe Called Quest, Outkast, Eminem, Lauryn Hill, and J. Dilla as hip-hop influences, but was also influenced from early on by the funk, soul, and jazz of Michael Jackson, Stevie Wonder, Marvin Gaye, Teddy Pendergrass, Miles Davis. When it came to putting together and performing with a live band, Decora commented, "Ska, rock, and funk have always been favorite genres of mine, so putting a hip-hop flow together with a band felt like a natural evolution for me.”

== Activism ==
Since the beginning of his musical career, Decora has been an activist for whom art and progressive work are "simply inseparable." One of Decora's admitted heroes is Pete Seeger, the patriarch of socially progressive music.

But music isn't Decora's only method of bringing about social change. In 2008, he founded the Urban Farmers League to grow organic produce for Newburgh's low-income residents. The organization has since become part of Cornell Cooperative Extension’s agricultural programing, and Decora has founded three Newburgh, NY, farms, prompting Hudson Valley magazine to include him on its “People to Watch” list in 2012.

In 2017, following the release of his second studio album Beyond Belief, Decora was tapped to join CNN's Van Jones on his WE RISE tour, which was a 13-city nationwide tour featuring entertainers, athletes, community leaders, and surprise guests with the same focus on criminal justice reform.

On September 23, 2018, Decora performed at the At What Cost event at the Apollo Theater. The event organizers Global Citizen and Vera Institute of Justice teamed up with hosts Hill Harper and Symone Sanders to present an evening of testimonials, musical performances, and thought-provoking conversation about criminal justice reform and mass incarceration in America.

In 2019, Decora's commitment to local activism in the Hudson Valley earned him the Orange County Human Rights award.

== Newburgh, NY & The Hudson Valley ==
Decora may have had a transient family life growing up, but he's clear when he says he now considers the Hudson Valley his home. In 2018, Genius highlighted Newburgh’s Pardison Fontaine and Decora as two “hidden gems” diversifying the sound associated with the Hudson Valley.

== Discography ==
=== Albums ===
- Bread And Oats (2015)
- Beyond Belief (2017)
- Reverie (2018)
- Instrumentals (2019)
- Ink Lloyd Tapes (2021)

=== EPs ===
- Better (2019)
- Relationships (2019)
- Wolves (2019)
- Oscillate (2019)
- Cashmere (2019)
- Conclusions (2019)
- Lunar (2019)
- Home (2019)
- Stamina (2019)

=== Singles ===
- Radio (2014)
- Flowers (2014)
- I'm With You (2018)
- Can't Speak (2018)
- Wolves (2019)
- Electric Feeling (2019)
- Want to Be (2019)
- Believe in Ghosts (2019)
- Lavamanos (2020)
- Mama (2021)
