= Cherry Vanilla =

American singer-songwriter, publicist, and actress

- Also known as: Cherry Vanilla
- Born: Kathleen Dorritie; October 16, 1943 (age 82); Woodside, Queens, New York City
- Genres: Glam rock (early); glam punk
- Occupation: singer-songwriter
- Instrument: Vocals
- Label: RCA Records
- Website: cherry-vanilla.com

Cherry Vanilla (born Kathleen Dorritie; October 16, 1943) is an American singer-songwriter, publicist, and actress. After working as an actress in Andy Warhol's Pork, she worked as a publicist for David Bowie, before becoming a rock singer. She subsequently became a publicist for Vangelis.

== Career ==
Kathleen Dorritie was born in Woodside, New York. Adopting the stage name Cherry Vanilla, she starred in the London productions of Andy Warhol's play, Pork, directed by Tony Ingrassia, and other Theatre of the Ridiculous plays including a role as a necrophiliac nurse. She worked for MainMan LTD as David Bowie's publicist, in the early 1970s.

She became known for her outrageous marketing strategies, which included an open offer to perform oral sex on any DJ who would play Bowie's records and a series of radio commercials that began "Hi, my name is Cherry Vanilla and I've got scoops for you…".

After parting ways with Bowie in 1974, Vanilla formed her first band with Kasim Sulton, which played under her name. In 1976, she formed Cherry Vanilla & her Staten Island Band, with Buzzy John Vierno (bass guitar), Frankie LaRocka (drums), Thomas Morrongiello (guitar), and Gary Cohen (piano). The group's first released material was the track "Shake Your Ashes", on the Max's Kansas City album of 1976. 1976 also saw the release of Vanilla's art book, Pop Tart.

Her high profile in New York was the impetus for Miles Copeland III to invite her to England. She relocated to London in 1976, becoming part of the burgeoning punk scene and was signed by RCA Records. The London-based Cherry Vanilla Band initially consisted of Vanilla's boyfriend/guitarist Louis Lepore and pianist Zecca Esquibel, along with bassist Gordon "Sting" Sumner, guitarist Henry Padovani and drummer Stewart Copeland, who loaned their services and equipment in exchange for £15 a night and the support spot on her tour, including a date on March 5, 1977 at London's legendary Roxy Club. (The support spot was for Copeland's band The Police, and would be the setting for the band's first live performances.)

A more permanent line-up comprised Louis Lepore (guitar), Zecca Esquibel (keyboards), Howie Finkel (bass guitar), and Michael (Manny) Mancuso (drums). Their first release was the single "The Punk" in September 1977, followed in February 1978 by the debut album Bad Girl. Finkel and Esquibel left the band and with a string of replacements the band continued, releasing another single and a second album, Venus D'Vinyl, in 1979. She split up with Lepore and the group disbanded, with Vanilla returning to the U.S.

In 1980 she performed the narrative on Vangelis' "Not A Bit – All Of It" (from his See You Later album). She later ran his American office. In 1984, she played the hitchhiker and the waitress on Roger Waters' album, The Pros and Cons of Hitch Hiking In 1987, she was the composer in the boxing club documentary film Broken Noses. She returned to recording in the early 1990s, releasing Blue Roses, with Man Parrish and Barb Morrison, plus two singles. Blue Roses combines spoken word poetry with electronic music.

Her autobiography, Lick Me: How I Became Cherry Vanilla, was published in October 2010 by the Chicago Review Press. The foreword was written by Rufus Wainwright.

A launch party for "Lick Me" was held November 4, 2010 at Chateau Marmont in Los Angeles where Rufus Wainwright performed and Angela Bowie was in attendance.

== Trivia ==
A song entitled "Cherry Vanilla" celebrating her career and recorded by The (Fabulous) Cult of John Harley was produced by Martin Rushent. The song was used during the launch of the book "Lick Me".

== Filmography ==
- Let's Get Lost (1988), herself

== Discography ==
=== Albums ===
- Bad Girl (1978), RCA
- Venus d'Vinyl (1979), RCA
- Blue Roses (with Man Parrish) (1993), E.S.P.

=== Singles ===
- "The Punk" (1977), RCA
- "Liverpool" (1978), RCA Victor – Netherlands only
- "Moonlight" (1979), RCA
- "Fone Sex" (1991), Radikal – with Man Parrish
- "Techno Sex" (1992), Radikal – with Man Parrish

=== Books ===
- "Lick Me: How I Became Cherry Vanilla" (2010) Chicago Review Press
