= David Bowie: Sound and Vision (documentary) =

- Cover of David Bowie: Sound and Vision DVD (2003)
- Original title: David Bowie: Sound and Vision
- Directed by: Rick Hull
- Written by: Rick Hull
- Produced by: Kevin Burns; Frankie Glass; Kim Sheerin; Rick Hull
- Starring: David Bowie; Carlos Alomar; Toni Basil; Candy Clark; Robin Clark; Tom Conti; Brian Eno; Owen Frampton; Mike Garson; Eric Idle; Iman; Jeff Koons; David Mallet; Geoff McCormack; Alexander McQueen; Moby; Iggy Pop; Trent Reznor; Mick Rock; Nile Rodgers; George Underwood; Tony Visconti; David Wild; Alan Yentob
- Narrated by: Jonathan Pryce
- Cinematography: Martin Kauper; Lars Bunch
- Edited by: Troy Bogert; Jeff Frey; David Kalish; Cecily Rhett; Tori Rodman
- Music by: David Bowie; Alan Ett
- Production companies: A&E; Fox Television Studios; Prometheus Entertainment; Foxstar Productions
- Distributed by: 20th Television
- Release date: 2002 (home release 2003)
- Running time: 90 min
- Country: USA
- Language: English

David Bowie: Sound and Vision is a 2002 documentary film about the English musician, made by the American television network A&E for their long running documentary television series and media franchise Biography. It was first broadcast on A&E on 4 November 2002. It was released as a DVD the following year.

After the BBC's Omnibus produced Cracked Actor (1975), and the self-produced Ricochet (1984) and Black Tie White Noise (1993), the film is the fourth official music documentary sanctioned by David Bowie. While there are major differences in the format of these three previous films, their common trait is that they focus upon Bowie at the time in which the film is being made; David Bowie: Sound and Vision was the first full-career retrospective biography. It was produced during 2002 as Bowie was completing and releasing the album Heathen.

== Background ==
Biography is an American documentary television series and media franchise created in the early 1960s by David Wolper. Each episode depicts the life of a notable person with narration, on-camera interviews, photographs, and stock footage. The show originally ran in syndication in 1962–1964, on CBS in 1979, and on A&E from 1987. In 2002 the series made an episode on Bowie, who had just completed his album Heathen, and was preparing for its release. While Bowie did not take part in the documentary in any way, he endorsed the programme, and his wife Iman and many of his friends and collaborators were filmed being interviewed. Narration was provided by the Welsh actor Jonathan Pryce from a script by director Rick Hull. The programme was released on DVD the following year, dropping the series title Biography.

Bowie: Sound & Vision covers Bowie’s life from his birth in 1947 to 2002. It includes interview footage previously filmed from many periods of Bowie's career, from an interview with his band The Manish Boys (when still called David Jones) in 1964, to an interview recorded in 1999 around the time of the hours... album. There is also footage taken from live performances, music videos and Bowie's film acting. The interviews include childhood friends, music collaborators and producers.

== Reception ==
Reviewing the documentary in 2019, Albumism wrote: ‘A thorough primer on the late great Bowie’s career progression and the bold, brave transformations that defined his musical repertoire and public persona through the release of 2002’s Heathen. Nicolas Pegg, author of The Complete David Bowie, writes on the film: 'Despite a few gaps and inexactitudes it's a good solid account of Bowie's career' with a 'wealth of rare archive material'.

== Rerelease ==
The DVD was rereleased in 2013 remastered in Dolby Digital 5.1.

== Content ==
The DVD release is organised into ten named chapters, which follows the original fade-outs for advertising breaks during television transmission. Interviews with everyone except Bowie were filmed for the documentary. Interviews with Bowie are archive footage from the following sources (where known):

- Davie Jones with band The Manish Boys on BBC Tonight with Cliff Michelmore (1964).
- David Bowie BBC Nationwide report by Bernard Falk (5 June 1973).
- Cracked Actor by Alan Yentob for BBC Omnibus (26 January 1975).
- David Bowie interviewed by Alan Yentob for BBC Arena (1978).
- David Bowie Unknown Earthling era interview (1997).
- David Bowie interviewed by Tim Rice for BBC Friday Night, Saturday Morning (10 October 1980).
- David Bowie Unknown Let's Dance era interview (1983).
- David Bowie speaks to Jeremy Paxman on BBC Newsnight (1999).

Chapter	Title	Time	Period	Music	Interviews
1	David R. Jones turns into David Bowie	11.25	Intro	"Fame '90" (soundtrack only)	TV historian David Wild; Singer and choreographer Toni Basil; Model and actress Iman; Producer Tony Visconti; Musicians Moby and Trent Reznor
1	David R. Jones turns into David Bowie	11.25	1947-1966	"Ziggy Stardust" from Ziggy Stardust: The Motion Picture; "Young Americans" (soundtrack only)	Bowie: Tonight (1964); Earthling era interview (1997); Newsnight (1999); Tony Visconti; Friends Geoff McCormack and George Underwood; Former teacher Owen Frampton
2	Major Tom	7:50	1966 - 1969	"Space Oddity" single with a clip of original "Space Oddity" video from Love You till Tuesday film.	Tony Visconti, Geoff McCormack, George Underwood; Photographer Mick Rock; Musician Iggy Pop; Actor Eric Idle
3	Changes	7:17	1969 - 1972	"I'm Waiting for the Man" by David Bowie and The Hype (1970) film clip; "Changes" (soundtrack only)	Bowie: Newsnight (1999); Tony Visconti, Geoff McCormack, Mick Rock, Iggy Pop, Eric Idle
4	Ziggy Stardust	10:04	1972 - 1973	"Ziggy Stardust", "Suffragette City", "Changes" from Ziggy Stardust: The Motion Picture	Bowie: Nationwide (1973); Earthling era interview (1997); Tony Visconti, Mick Rock, Moby; Musician Mike Garson; Fashion designer Alexander McQueen
5	Rebel Rebel	6:50	1973 - 1974	"Rebel Rebel" from Top Top	Bowie: Cracked Actor (1975); Toni Basil, Tony Visconti, Mick Rock, Mike Garson; Musician Carlos Alomar; Singer Robin Clark; Producer Brian Eno
6	Fame	9:50	1974 - 1976	"Young Americans" (soundtrack only); "Fame" (soundtrack only); "Golden Years" (soundtrack only); "'Heroes'" (soundtrack only)	Bowie: Cracked Actor (1975); Arena (1978); Tony Visconti, Iggy Pop, Carlos Alomar, Robin Clark; Filmmaker Alan Yentob; Actors Tom Conti and Candy Clark
7	Ashes To Ashes	11:35	1977 - 1983	"Subterraneans" (soundtrack only); "'Heroes'" (music video); "Peace on Earth/Little Drummer Boy" TV performance with Bing Crosby; "Ashes to Ashes" (music video); "Modern Love" (soundtrack only)	Bowie: Friday Night, Saturday Morning (1980); David Wild, Tony Visconti, Iggy Pop, Eric Idle, Carlos Alomar, Robin Clark, Brian Eno, Tom Conti; Music video and film director David Mallet
8	Let's Dance	8:17	1983 - 1987	"Let's Dance" (music video); "China Girl" (music video); "Modern Love" (music video); "Blue Jean" (music video); "'Heroes'" live from Live Aid; "Dancing in the Street" (with Mick Jagger) (music video); "Absolute Beginners" (soundtrack only); "Day-In Day-Out" from Glass Spider live	Bowie: Let's Dance era interview (1983); Earthling era interview (1997); David Wild, Eric Idle, Carlos Alomar; Musician and producer Nile Rodgers
9	Tin Machine	7:44	1988 - 1999	"Tin Machine"(music video); "Jump They Say" (music video); A Small Plot of Land? (with "The Hearts Filthy Lesson" video images); "Little Wonder" (music video);	David Wild, Iman, Trent Reznor, Mick Rock, Eric Idle, Brian Eno, Nile Rodgers; Artist Jeff Koons
10	Slow Burn	6:42	2000 - 2002	"Slow Burn" (music video); "Suffragette City" from Ziggy Stardust: The Motion Picture; "Changes" (soundtrack only)	Bowie: Newsnight (1999); Earthling era interview (1997); David Wild, Iman, Moby, Trent Reznor, Tony Visconti, Mick Rock, Carlos Alomar, Robin Clark, Alexander McQueen, Jeff Koons
