= David Bowie: Black Tie White Noise =

Black Tie White Noise
- Original VHS Video Cover
- Directed by: David Mallet (main film); Matthew Rolston ("Miracle Goodnight"); Mark Romanek ("Jump They Say" & "Black Tie White Noise")
- Produced by: Lana Topham & Paul Flattery
- Starring: David Bowie
- Edited by: Lauren Harris
- Music by: David Bowie
- Production company: BMG Video
- Release date: 1993
- Running time: 63 minutes

Black Tie White Noise

Video by David Bowie
- Released: 1993

David Bowie chronology
Bowie – The Video Collection (1993)	Black Tie White Noise (1993)	Best of Bowie (2002)

David Bowie: Black Tie White Noise is a 1993 film accompanying the release of the David Bowie album of the same name. The primary purpose of the film was to remove the need of a tour to promote the album. It was directed by long time Bowie collaborator David Mallet, and was originally released in 1993 on VHS.

The release is hybrid of documentary, music video film, and music video compilation. In this way it continues the lineage of several Bowie audio-visual formats: documentaries beginning with Cracked Actor (1975); music video films beginning with Love You till Tuesday (1969); and music video compilations beginning with Video EP (1983).

== Production ==
The main film was recorded on Saturday 8 May 1993, at the Hollywood Center Studios in Los Angeles. It consists of interviews with Bowie, behind the scenes footage of the making of the album, behind the scenes footage of the making of the Miracle Goodnight music video, and mimed performances of some tracks from the album. Notes from sleeve mention that the TV version of the production also includes a video for 'Don't Let Me Down & Down' with accompanying monologue, but has been omitted from all subsequent home video releases. However, the monologue and video have since been leaked online.

Released on VHS in 1993, this film also includes the three full-length music videos filmed for the albums' singles after the main film has concluded.

== Format ==
As a documentary, it continues the lineage of the BBC produced Cracked Actor (1975) and the Bowie produced Ricochet. As a music video film, it continues the lineage of audio-visual releases that were originally conceived as films, that is, a single video in a wider filmic setting or collection of music videos produced as a single project, or an amalgam of both, beginning with Love You till Tuesday (1969). As the home release formats also include a compilation of music videos filmed for the albums' singles, the film also continues the lineage of music video compilations, such as the Video EP (1983) and Day-In Day-Out (1987).

== Rereleases ==
A DVD version was released in 2001 in some Far East countries. In 2003, the DVD was remastered and included with EMI's 10th Anniversary CD reissue of Black Tie White Noise. A stand-alone DVD version of this release was issued in 2003.

== Contents ==
On the VHS/LD releases, only major musical performances are given track numbers; interviews with Bowie are interspersed between the musical numbers. On the 10th anniversary version of the album and 2003 re-release DVD, the chapter stops were expanded to include the inter-song interviews. The list below reflects the latest issue.

1. "Introduction"
2. "With Lester Bowie"
3. "On Reeves Gabrels"
4. "You've Been Around"
5. "Expanding and Experimenting"
6. "Nite Flights"
7. "Otherness"
8. "Miracle Goodnight"
9. "On Marriage"
10. "Black Tie White Noise"
11. "With Mick Ronson"
12. "I Feel Free"
13. "With Nile Rodgers"
14. "I Know It's Gonna Happen Someday"
15. "Miracle Goodnight" (promo video)
16. "Jump They Say" (promo video)
17. "Black Tie White Noise" (promo video)
18. "Credits"
