= Sound and Vision (disambiguation) =

"Sound and Vision" is a song by David Bowie.

Sound and Vision, Sound & Vision and Sound + Vision may also refer to:

== Other David Bowie media ==
- Sound + Vision (box set), a David Bowie box set
- Sound+Vision Tour, a David Bowie concert tour
- David Bowie: Sound and Vision (documentary), a David Bowie documentary film

== Other music ==
- Sounds and Visions, an album by The Earl Klugh Trio
- Greatest Hits: Sound & Vision , a greatest hits album by Blondie

== Companies ==
- Sound & Vision (magazine), a home electronics and entertainment magazine
- Sound & Vision India, an Indian dubbing studio
- Netherlands Institute for Sound and Vision, an audio-visual archive of Dutch television, radio, music and film
