= Miracle Goodnight =

1993 single by David Bowie

Single by David Bowie

from the album Black Tie White Noise
- B-side: "Looking for Lester"
- Released: 11 October 1993
- Studio: Mountain (Montreux); Hit Factory (New York City)
- Length: 4:14
- Label: Arista
- Songwriter: David Bowie
- Producer: Nile Rodgers

David Bowie singles chronology
"Black Tie White Noise" (1993)	"Miracle Goodnight" (1993)	"The Buddha of Suburbia" (1993)

Music video
- "Miracle Goodnight" on YouTube

"Miracle Goodnight" is a song by English singer-songwriter David Bowie, released in October 1993 by Arista Records as the third and final single from his 18th studio album, Black Tie White Noise (1993). The song was written by Bowie and produced by Nile Rodgers. It reached number 40 on the UK Singles Chart. The accompanying music video was directed by Matthew Rolston.

== Background ==
While the previous two singles from the album, "Jump They Say" and "Black Tie White Noise", covered issues such as mental illness and legal injustice, "Miracle Goodnight" features a more unabashed recurring theme of the album – Bowie's love for his new bride, Iman Abdulmajid. He declared the whole album "a wedding present" for Iman.

== Critical reception ==
Alan Jones from Music Week wrote, "This is one of Black Tie White Noise's more attractive tracks, an offbeat and intimate affair with flashes of the old Bowie in the counter harmonies." A reviewer from Philadelphia Inquirer commented, "'Miracle Goodnight' may boast one of the clumsiest lyrics D. B. has ever penned (I wished I was a sailor a thousand miles from here / I wished I had a future / Anywhere). But with a house-quaking foundation, Rodgers' sparkling, Caribbean-flavored guitar solo, and a Philip Glass-like coda, 'Miracle' adds up to one of Bowie's most endearing numbers." In his review of the album, Clark Collis from Select said, "In fairness, a few funk-fused tracks like 'Miracle Goodnight' is at least an improvement on Bowie's previous brace of solo outings."

== Music video ==
The song's music video was directed by American artist, photographer, director and creative director Matthew Rolston, featuring Bowie unmoved by a harem of beautiful women while singing the song to camera, as well as scenes of him in a jester's outfit, playing with mirrors, dressed as a mime, and even returning briefly to his fashion style as the Thin White Duke from 1976. It was produced by Alison Dicky for O Pictures and released on 20 September 1993.

== Track listings ==
All tracks were by written by David Bowie.

- 7-inch: Arista-BMG / 74321 16226 7 (Netherlands)
1. "Miracle Goodnight" – 4:14
2. "Looking for Lester" – 5:36
- 12-inch: Arista-BMG / 74321 16226 1 (Netherlands)
1. "Miracle Goodnight" (Blunted 2) – 8:12
2. "Miracle Goodnight" (Make Believe Mix) – 4:14
3. "Miracle Goodnight" (2 Chord Philly Mix) – 6:22
4. "Miracle Goodnight" (Dance Dub) – 7:50
- CD: Arista-BMG / 74321 16226 2 (Netherlands)
1. "Miracle Goodnight" – 4:14
2. "Miracle Goodnight" (2 Chord Philly Mix) – 6:22
3. "Miracle Goodnight" (Masereti Blunted Dub) – 7:40
4. "Looking for Lester" – 5:36
- Digital download
1. "Miracle Goodnight" – 4:15
2. "Miracle Goodnight" (2 Chord Philly Mix) – 6:25
3. "Miracle Goodnight" (Masereti Blunted Dub) – 7:43
4. "Miracle Goodnight" (Make Believe Mix) – 4:30

== Personnel ==
Production

- Nile Rodgers

Remix production

- Tony Maserati and Robert Holms for Two Chord Music

Musicians

- David Bowie – vocals, saxophone on "Looking for Lester"
- Nile Rodgers – guitar
- Barry Campbell – bass
- Sterling Campbell – drums
- Richard Hilton – keyboards
- Lester Bowie – trumpet
- Mike Garson – piano on "Looking for Lester"

== Other releases ==
- The "Make Believe Mix" of the song was included on the bonus disc for the 10th anniversary edition of Black Tie White Noise. It was the first time the mix was available on CD.

== Charts ==
Chart (1993)	Peak position
UK Singles (OCC)	40
UK Airplay (Music Week)	39
