= Ludeman =

Ludeman is a surname. Notable people with the surname include:

- Cal Ludeman (born 1951), American politician
- Keith Ludeman (born 1950), British businessman
- Tim Ludeman (born 1987), Australian cricketer
