= Black Tie White Noise (song) =

Song by David Bowie

Single by David Bowie featuring Al B. Sure!

from the album Black Tie White Noise
- B-side: "You've Been Around" (Dangers remix)
- Released: 1 June 1993
- Studio: Mountain (Montreux); Hit Factory (New York City)
- Genre: Soul
- Length: 4:52 (album version); 4:10 (radio edit)
- Label: Arista; BMG; Savage
- Songwriter: David Bowie
- Producer: Nile Rodgers

David Bowie singles chronology
"Jump They Say" (1993)	"Black Tie White Noise" (1993)	"Miracle Goodnight" (1993)

Music video
- "Black Tie White Noise" on YouTube

"Black Tie White Noise" is a song by the English singer-songwriter David Bowie, released as the title track of his eighteenth studio album of the same name (1993). Featuring guest vocals by Al B. Sure!, it was written by Bowie, produced by Nile Rodgers and released as the second single from the album in June 1993 by Arista, BMG and Savage. It peaked at number 36 in the UK. The accompanying music video was directed by Mark Romanek.

== Background ==
The track was inspired by Bowie's stay in Los Angeles in April 1992, when the city saw race riots in reaction to the Rodney King incident. Speaking to Record Collector in 1993, Bowie expressed sympathy with the rioters, likening the event to a prison revolt while also lamenting a perceived lack of "real change in Los Angeles" in its wake.

It is among the most jazz- and soul-influenced tracks on the album, highlighted by the key vocal of Al B. Sure!, although Lenny Kravitz was reportedly Bowie's first choice for the duet. Essentially a rhythm and blues tune, the song ultimately reinforced the feeling of Bowie's tendency as a chameleon of musical styles.

== Release ==
Released as the album's second single, "Black Tie White Noise" was a top 40 hit in Britain and subsequently reached No. 36 in the UK chart and No. 74 in Australia.

== Critical reception ==
Dave Simpson from Melody Maker commented, "This isn't bad. Nice cosmopolitan New York rhythm section, vague hints of Low-era sax. Hmmm. Apparently it's inspired by the LA riots, or rather David's view of them from the rooftop of his mansion." Alan Jones from Music Week wrote, "This oddly churning but attractive track is a little too slow for current dancefloor tastes. Not as instant as many of Bowie's bigger hits, it will need a lot to push it into the top end of the chart. A moderate hit." Parry Gettelman from Orlando Sentinel felt it's "one of the better ones" on the album, adding, "The groove is faux-funky, and the melody is undercooked, but Bowie's trumpet injects flavor, and the lyrics have something to say about race relations in America: "Getting my facts from a Benetton ad/ looking through African eyes/ lit by the glare of an L.A. fire/ I've got a face, not just my race." Bowie's cool, detached voice is nicely partnered by that of soul singer Al B. Sure!, and Bowie sneaks in a Marvin Gaye allusion." James Hamilton from the Record Mirror Dance Update described it as a "gloomy slow roller". Leesa Daniels from Smash Hits gave "Black Tie White Noise" a full score of five out of five, declaring it as "fabulous", "funky and soulful – and you could listen to it again and again and never get bored. Genius."

== Music video ==
The music video for "Black Tie White Noise" was produced by American filmmaker and photographer Mark Romanek, featuring a montage of African-American youth playing in urban Los Angeles, while intercut with scenes of Bowie in a blue suit with his saxophone and Al B. Sure! singing. The video attempted to capture Bowie's image behind the song: multiple ethnic groups coexisting with their own identities, and not attempting to absorb one another.

== Track listing ==
- 7" version
1. "Black Tie White Noise" (Radio Edit) (Bowie) – 4:10
2. "You've Been Around" (Dangers Remix) (Bowie, Gabrels) – 4:24
- 12" version
1. "Black Tie White Noise" (Extended Remix) (Bowie) – 8:12
2. "Black Tie White Noise" (Trance Mix) (Bowie) – 7:15
3. "Black Tie White Noise" (Album Version) (Bowie) – 4:52
4. "Black Tie White Noise" (Club Mix) (Bowie) – 7:33
5. "Black Tie White Noise" (Extended Urban Mix) (Bowie) – 5:32
- CD version
1. "Black Tie White Noise" (Radio Edit) (Bowie) – 4:10
2. "Black Tie White Noise" (Extended Remix) (Bowie) – 8:12
3. "Black Tie White Noise" (Urban Mix) (Bowie) – 4:03
4. "You've Been Around" (Dangers Remix) (Bowie, Gabrels) – 4:24
- US commercial CD (Savage 74785-50045-2)
1. "Black Tie White Noise" (Waddell's Mix) – 4:12
2. "Black Tie White Noise" (3rd Floor Mix) – 3:42
3. "Black Tie White Noise" (Al B. Sure! Mix) – 4:03
4. "Black Tie White Noise" (Album Version) – 4:52
5. "Black Tie White Noise" (Club Mix) – 7:33
6. "Black Tie White Noise" (Digi Funky's Lush Mix) – 5:44
7. "Black Tie White Noise" (Supa Pump Mix) – 6:36
- US promo DJ 12" (Savage SADJ-50045-1)
1. "Black Tie White Noise" (Extended Remix) – 8:12
2. "Black Tie White Noise" (Club Mix) – 7:33
3. "Black Tie White Noise" (Trance Mix) – 7:15
4. "Black Tie White Noise" (Digi Funky's Lush Mix) – 5:44
5. "Black Tie White Noise" (Supa Pump Mix) – 6:36
6. "Black Tie White Noise" (Funky Crossover Mix) – 3:45
7. "Black Tie White Noise" (Extended Urban Remix) – 5:32
- US promo DJ CD (Savage SADJ-50046-2)
1. "Black Tie White Noise" (Chr Mix 1) – 3:43
2. "Black Tie White Noise" (Chr Mix 2) – 4:12
3. "Black Tie White Noise" (Churban Mix) – 3:45
4. "Black Tie White Noise" (Urban Mix) – 4:03
5. "Black Tie White Noise" (Album edit) – 4:10
- 'CHR Mix 1' is the '3rd Floor Mix' on the regular US CD
- 'CHR Mix 2' is the 'Waddell's Mix' on the regular US CD
- 'Urban Mix' is the 'Al B. Sure! Mix' on the regular US CD

Tracks #1–3 re-produced, re-arranged and mixed by Marc 'Funkyman' Paley, Raul 'DJ EFX' Recinos & Jeremy 'DJ Digit' Cowan
Track # 2 remix and additional production by John Waddell
Track # 4 remix and additional production by Al B. Sure & Timar

== Credits and personnel ==
- Producers:
  - Nile Rodgers
- Musicians:
  - David Bowie – vocals
  - Al B. Sure! – vocals
  - Nile Rodgers – guitar
  - Barry Campbell – bass
  - Sterling Campbell – drums
  - Richard Hilton – keyboards
  - Lester Bowie – trumpet
  - Reeves Gabrels – guitar on "You've Been Around"

== Charts ==
Chart (1993)	Peak position
Australia (ARIA)	74
Europe (Eurochart Hot 100)	75
Europe (European Hit Radio)	32
UK Singles (OCC)	36
UK Airplay (Music Week)	18
UK Dance (Music Week)	25

== Other releases ==
The "3rd Floor US Radio Mix" and "Here Come Da Jazz" remixes appeared on the bonus disc of the 10th anniversary re-release of the Black Tie White Noise album.
