= Ravens Wood School =

Location
- Oakley Road (A233); Bromley, BR2 8HP; England; 51°22′08″N 00°02′11″E

Information
- Type: Academy
- Motto: Committed to Excellence and Innovation
- Local authority: Bromley
- Department for Education URN: 136517 Tables
- Ofsted: Reports
- Headteacher: Melanie Lester
- Staff: 150 (approx.)
- Gender: Male 11-16, Mixed 16-18
- Age: 11 to 18
- Enrollment: 1,537 (2018)
- Colours: Green , Black and White
- Website: http://www.ravenswood.bromley.sch.uk/

Ravens Wood School, formerly Bromley Technical High School, located in Keston, London Borough of Bromley, England, is an all-boys school. The sixth form accepts both boys and girls. In 2018 the school had 1,537 pupils. The school is a designated technology college, specialising in Design Technology and Information Technology. The school became an academy on 1 April 2011.

Ravens Wood School (RWS) is part of the Impact Multi Academy Trust.

== Sport ==
In May 2007, the Year 10 football squad won the English Schools' Football Association Under 15 Schools' Cup. In April 2012, the Under 18 Rugby Academy reached the Daily Mail Vase Final played at Twickenham. Ravens Wood lost narrowly against the Leys School. In April 2014 the Year 8 team won the English Schools Football Association Under 13 Schools Cup on penalties at Reading's Madejski Stadium.

The RWS Football and Rugby academies are developed exclusively for students entering Sixth Form. As of 2015, there are around 30 students for the Rugby Academy and three teams for the Football Academy. The Football Academy is tied with Fulham FC which allows the students to closely participate with the club including use of their training facilities, coaches and pathways to semi-professional clubs.

In June 2023, year 12 student Fraser Macaulay debuted for Scotland Rugby league u18s.This is alongside other rugby league achievements such as Kai Pearce-Paul debuting for England Rugby League in the World Cup.

== Drama ==
The school has achieved success in the Rock Challenge dance/drama competition having won the Southern Premier league three consecutive years ((2008, 2009 and 2010)), a first occurrence for Rock Challenge and came in second in the first ever Rock Challenge National Final (2009). It is thought to be the first boys' school in the UK to take the contemporary dance drama title.

== Art ==
In the early 1960s, the Art department was led by the inspirational art teacher Owen Frampton (father of rock musician Peter Frampton). He had a massive creative influence on his students, steering them toward various outlets including drawing, design, and performance. His students included David Bowie and George Underwood, as well as his own sons Peter Frampton and Clive Frampton.

== Music Academy ==
The Ravens Wood Music Academy was established in September 2011.

Admission to the Music Academy is by audition only and ABRSM Grade 5 or equivalent in an instrument.

== Notable alumni ==
- Olugbenga Adelekan
- David Bowie
- Hardy Caprio
- Peter Frampton
- Hanif Kureishi
- Keith Ludeman
- Ian Parker
- Levi Douglas
- John Pienaar
- Steven Severin
- Starsmith
- George Underwood
- Kai Pearce-Paul
