= Black Tie White Noise =

1993 studio album by David Bowie

Studio album by David Bowie
- Released: 5 April 1993
- Recorded: April–November 1992
- Studios: Mountain (Montreux, Switzerland); 38 Fresh (Los Angeles); The Hit Factory (New York City)
- Genres: Art rock; electronic; soul
- Length: 56:24
- Labels: Savage; Arista
- Producers: David Bowie; Nile Rodgers

David Bowie chronology
| Early On (1964–1966) (1991) | Black Tie White Noise (1993) | The Buddha of Suburbia (1993) |

Singles from Black Tie White Noise
- 1. "Jump They Say" Released: 15 March 1993; 2. "Black Tie White Noise" Released: 1 June 1993; 3. "Miracle Goodnight" Released: 11 October 1993

Black Tie White Noise is the eighteenth studio album by the English musician David Bowie, released on 5 April 1993 through Savage Records in the United States and Arista Records in the United Kingdom. Conceived following Bowie's marriage to the model Iman and the disbandment of his rock band Tin Machine, it was recorded for most of 1992 between studios in Montreux, Los Angeles and New York City. Bowie co-produced with his Let's Dance (1983) collaborator Nile Rodgers, who voiced dissatisfaction with the project in later decades. The album features several guest appearances, including previous collaborators Mike Garson and Mick Ronson, and new arrivals Lester Bowie and Chico O'Farrill.

Inspired to write the title track after witnessing the 1992 Los Angeles riots, Black Tie White Noise is primarily separated into themes of racial harmony and David's marriage to Iman. It features prevalent saxophone work from Bowie and a wide variety of musical styles, from art rock, electronic and soul, to jazz, pop and hip-hop influences. It also contains multiple instrumentals and cover versions. The album's lead single "Jump They Say" alludes to Bowie's half brother, Terry, who died in 1985.

Released amidst the rise of Britpop in the UK, Black Tie White Noise initially received favourable reviews from music critics, who praised its experimentation but criticised its lack of cohesion. It debuted at number one on the UK Albums Chart, with each of its three singles reaching the UK top 40. Its promotion in the United States was stalled following the dissolution of Savage Records, resulting in the album's rarity until later reissues. Instead of touring, Bowie released an accompanying film of the same name to support it.

Despite mixed assessments from critics in subsequent decades, Black Tie White Noise marked the beginning of Bowie's commercial revival and improved critical standing following a string of poorly received projects. An interactive CD-ROM based on the album was released in 1994. It was reissued by EMI in 2003 and remastered in 2021 as part of the box set Brilliant Adventure (1992–2001).

== Background ==
David Bowie began recording material with his former Let's Dance (1983) collaborator Nile Rodgers months after disbanding the rock band Tin Machine. The pair, who had reconnected in New York City after a 1991 Tin Machine concert, first recorded "Real Cool World" for the animated film Cool World. Released as a single in August 1992, it appeared on the film's accompanying soundtrack album and featured a sound that foreshadowed Bowie's direction for his next solo record, his first since Never Let Me Down six years earlier.

In October 1990, Bowie met the Somali model Iman in Los Angeles as he resumed recording with Tin Machine following the Sound+Vision Tour. They married on 24 April 1992 in a private ceremony in Lausanne, Switzerland. (Note: Bowie and Iman formalised their marriage in another ceremony in June, which featured numerous celebrity guests.) Five days later, the two returned to Los Angeles on the day the 1992 Los Angeles riots began, forcing the newly-weds to stay in a hotel and witness the violence from inside. (Note: The riots inspired Bowie to write the album's title track.) Bowie later reflected: "It was an extraordinary feeling. I think the one thing that sprang into our minds was that it felt more like a prison riot than anything else. It felt as if innocent inmates of some vast prison were trying to break out, break free from their bonds." According to the biographer Nicholas Pegg, both the wedding and racial divide influenced Bowie's next album.

== Production ==
=== Recording history ===
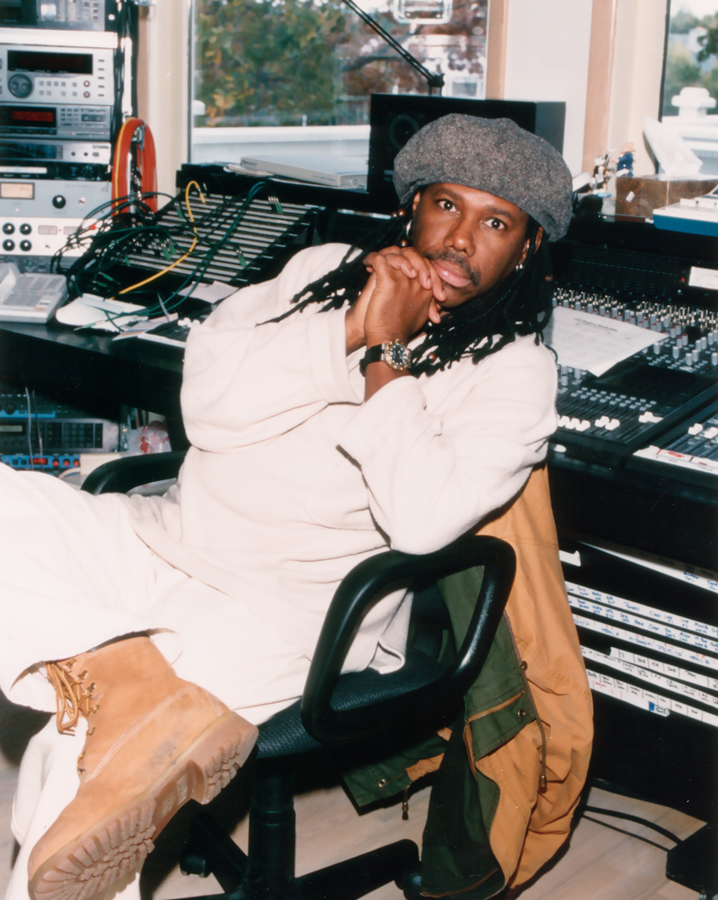
Black Tie White Noise marked the return of the producer Nile Rodgers (pictured in 1999), who previously co-produced Bowie's 1983 album Let's Dance.

With Bowie and Rodgers co-producing, recording for Black Tie White Noise took place between April and November 1992, alternating between Mountain Studios in Montreux, Switzerland, and the Hit Factory in New York City, with additional recording done at 38 Fresh studio in Los Angeles. According to the biographer Chris O'Leary, Bowie composed beats and patterns at 38 Fresh, which he sent to Rodgers at the Hit Factory to transpose into songs. Rodgers described Bowie's attitude as calmer than Let's Dance, "a hell of a lot more philosophical and just in a state of mind where his music was really, really making him happy".

Both Bowie and Rodgers gave positive statements regarding the sessions in contemporary interviews. Speaking with Rolling Stone, both said they were not looking to do Let's Dance II, Bowie remarking they "would have done [that] years ago". (Note: O'Leary says Bowie's previous attempt to create Let's Dance II resulted in 1984's Tonight.) Nevertheless, Rodgers made several unfavourable comparisons between the two records, including statements about Bowie's involvement and how Black Tie was more difficult to produce and took longer to record than Let's Dance. In the ensuing years, Rodgers expressed disappointment in Black Tie, brushing it off as "an exercise in futility" that was not as good as Let's Dance. The Tin Machine member Reeves Gabrels later said Bowie felt coerced into hiring Rodgers, who was intent on creating a Let's Dance follow-up, while Bowie wanted to pursue other musical directions. Decades later, Rodgers commented that he wanted a more commercial record, while Bowie was trying to "make this artistic statement about this period in his life".

During the sessions, Bowie signed a record contract with the American label Savage Records, affiliated with Arista Records and owned by BMG. Savage offered him the "artistic freedom" that he was craving: "[Studio head] David Nemran ... encouraged me to do exactly what I wanted to do, without any kind of indication that it would be manipulated, or that my ideas would be changed, or that other things would be required of me. That made me feel comfortable and that was the deciding factor." Nemran replied that Bowie would be the label's breakthrough: "He's everything that I would use to describe us."

=== Guest musicians ===
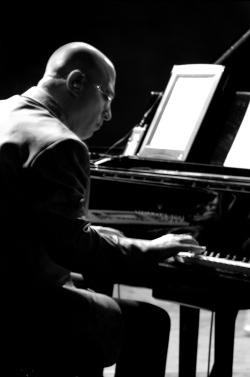
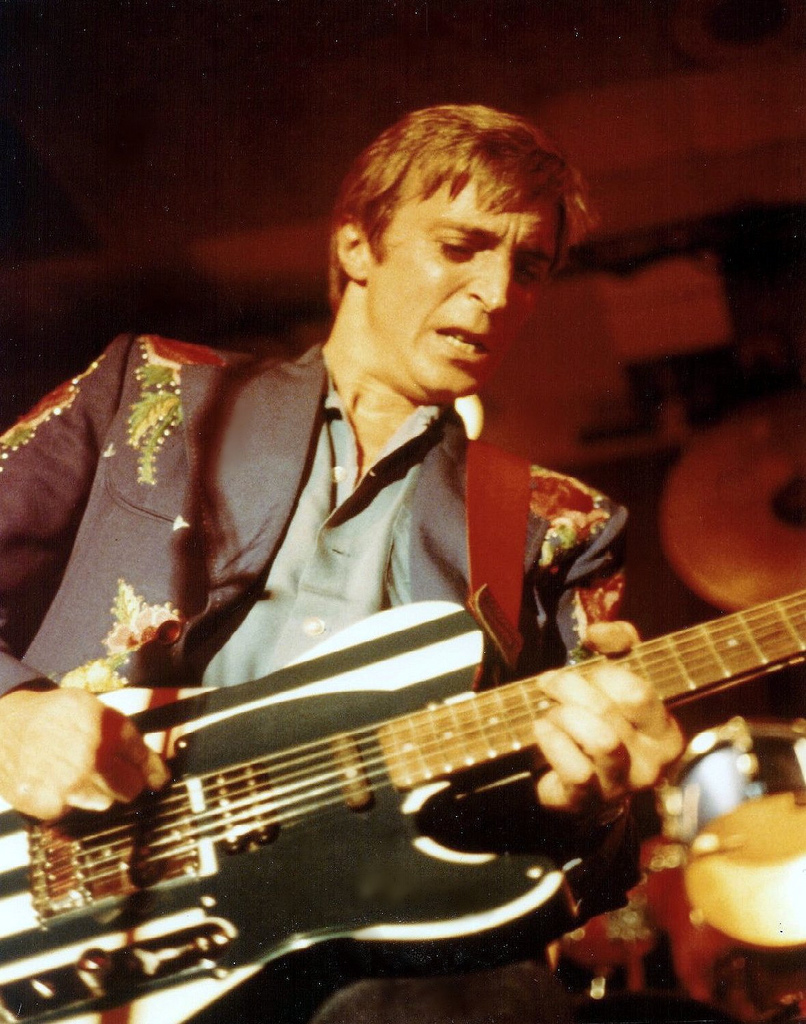
Black Tie White Noise features appearances by Mike Garson (left) and Mick Ronson (right), who had not worked with Bowie since the 1970s.

Black Tie White Noise features an array of guest musicians, some of whom had not collaborated with Bowie for decades. The guitarist Mick Ronson, a member of the Spiders from Mars backing band from 1971 to 1973, appears on a cover of Cream's "I Feel Free" (1966). (Note: "I Feel Free" was a longtime favourite of Bowie's, who performed it frequently with the Spiders in 1972. The song was initially shortlisted for his 1973 covers album Pin Ups before it was dropped. Another version was recorded during the sessions for Scary Monsters (and Super Creeps) (1980); a backing track was completed before the idea was scrapped.) Ronson, whose last appearance was on 1973's Pin Ups, (Note: Before Black Tie, Bowie and Ronson appeared on stage together at the Freddie Mercury Tribute Concert in April 1992.) reconnected with Bowie after the latter was impressed by the former's production work on Morrissey's Your Arsenal (1992). Bowie praised Ronson's contributions on Black Tie while the latter commented, "I hope David's album does well. He's put everything into it." Ronson died of cancer shortly after the album's release.

The pianist Mike Garson, whose last appearance on a Bowie record was 1975's Young Americans, plays on "Looking for Lester". Bowie told Record Collector in 1993: "He really has a gift. He kind of plops those jewels on the track and they're quite extraordinary, eccentric pieces of piano playing." The Trinidadian guitarist Tony Springer (credited as "Wild T" Springer) appears on a cover of Morrissey's Your Arsenal track "I Know It's Gonna Happen Someday". Bowie had met Springer in Canada during Tin Machine's It's My Life Tour and invited him to record. Bowie recalled that "he was an absolute delight", comparing his guitar style to Jimi Hendrix.

Gabrels plays lead guitar on "You've Been Around". The song was first attempted by Tin Machine during the sessions for their 1989 debut album, but Bowie was dissatisfied with the result so it was shelved, eventually rerecording it for Black Tie. (Note: Gabrels would later rerecord "You've Been Around" for his 1995 solo album The Sacred Squall of Now.) The singer Al B. Sure! duets with Bowie on the title track, of which the two worked on the arrangement extensively, leading Bowie to quip "I've never worked longer with any artist than with Al B".

Black Tie also features trumpet playing by Lester Bowie, whom David Bowie had wanted to work with throughout the 1980s. Lester, who played to tracks before he heard them, appears on six tracks; Pegg considers his contributions the album's "essential musical identity". A foil to Lester's trumpet was David's saxophone, which appears more prominently on Black Tie than any other David Bowie album. Rodgers found his saxophone playing challenging, telling Rolling Stone: "I think David would be the first to admit that he's not a saxophonist in the traditional sense. [...] He uses his playing as an artistic tool. He's a painter. He hears an idea, and he goes with it. But he absolutely knows where he's going." The album's horn arrangements were composed by the Afro-Cuban jazz player Chico O'Farrill. Black Tie also features several backing vocalists from Let's Dance and Labyrinth (1986), while the pianist Philippe Saisse and the producer David Richards returned from Never Let Me Down.

== Music and lyrics ==
I wanted to experiment on Black Tie, I love doing a hybrid of Eurocentric soul, but there were also pieces like "Pallas Athena" and "You've Been Around", which played more with ambience and funk.

— David Bowie, 1995

Black Tie White Noise features a wide variety of musical influences and styles, including soul, hip-hop, disco, pop, avant-garde jazz and gospel. Author James E. Perone also found references to Bowie's plastic soul work of the 1970s. Rolling Stone's Jason Newman described the music as "a blend of Euro-disco, techno-rock, freestyle jazz, Middle Eastern riffs and hip-hop", while AllMusic's Stephen Thomas Erlewine considered Black Tie an "urban soul record" that balances styles of the "commercial dance rock" of Let's Dance with the art rock of the late 1970s Berlin Trilogy. A writer for The Economist later categorised the record as art rock and electronic. In 1993, Bowie told Rolling Stone that his intent for Black Tie White Noise was making a new type of house record that brought back the "strong melodic content" of the 1960s, finding "the new R&B [of today]" a mixture of "hip-hop and house". He commented: "I think this album comes from a very different emotional place. That's the passing of time, which has brought maturity and a willingness to relinquish full control over my emotions."

Lyrically, Black Tie White Noise is primarily separated into two major themes: racial harmony and Bowie's marriage to Iman. Perone finds the "Black Tie" signifies "a wedding" while "White Noise" epitomises the "instrumentally focused, slightly experimental jazz pieces". For his wedding ceremony, he had composed an instrumental intended to fuse him and Iman's English and Somalian cultures. Writing the piece triggered Bowie to make the album:

Writing [the music for the wedding] brought my mind around to, obviously, what commitment means and why I was getting married at this age and what my intentions were and were they honorable? [laughs] And what I really wanted from my life from now on. I guess it acted as a watershed to write a lot of quite personal things, putting together a collection of songs that illustrated what I'd been going through over the past three or four years.

=== Songs ===
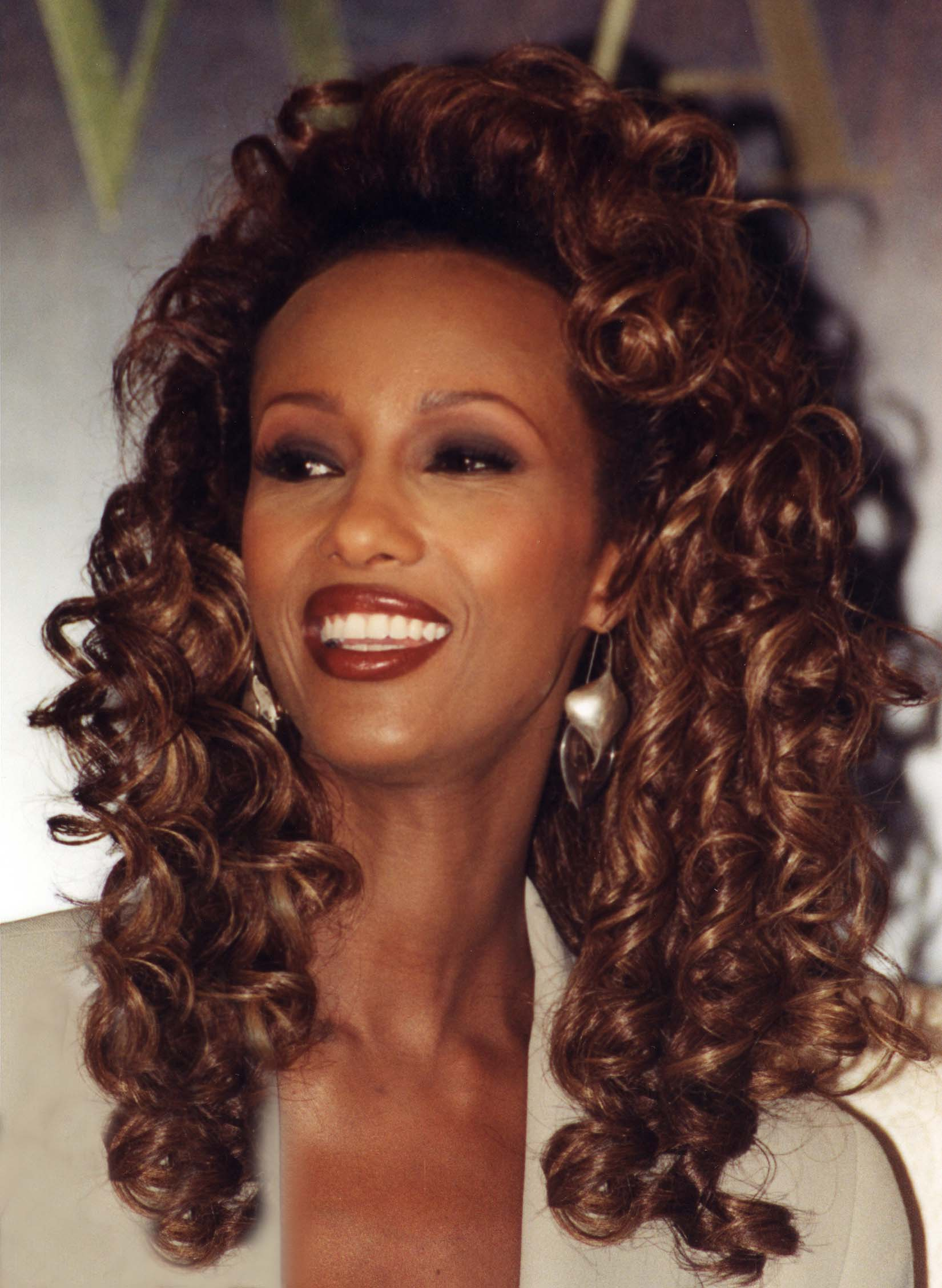
Bowie's marriage to Somalian model Iman (pictured in 1996) inspired numerous tracks on Black Tie White Noise.

Black Tie White Noise opens with the instrumental "The Wedding", a funk adaptation of the instrumental Bowie composed for his wedding. It's a piece that, in Pegg's words, "fuses dance beats, distant backing vocals and Eastern-influenced saxophone cadences" that set the stage for the remaining tracklist. The Black Tie version of "You've Been Around" blends contemporary dance music with elements of jazz. Although Bowie and Gabrels wrote it together, O'Leary says the new version "effectively erased...Reeves Gabrels". Pegg states the lyrics foreshadow the "fractal images" Bowie used for his next studio album, Outside (1995). Bowie's cover of "I Feel Free" is musically different from Cream's original, being described by Pegg as "techno-funk" and likened by Perone to "1990s dance music".

Bowie's recorded the title track with a rougher edge to avoid ending up like "an 'Ebony and Ivory' for the Nineties". To evoke the racial theme, the lyrics reference "We Are the World" by the supergroup USA for Africa (1985) and Marvin Gaye's "What's Going On" (1971); Pegg says that the "black and white voices" of Al B Sure! assist in the theme's presentation. Musically, the track is funky, with prevalent saxophone and trumpet by David and Lester Bowie, respectively. "Jump They Say" discusses themes of mental illness, and is loosely based on David's half brother Terry Burns, who died by suicide in 1985 after being hospitalised for schizophrenia. (Note: Terry Burns was a major influence on Bowie in the early 1970s; his presence is felt on numerous tracks from both The Man Who Sold the World (1970) and Hunky Dory (1971). Bowie also covered "I Feel Free" on Black Tie as a tribute to Terry, who took Bowie to a Cream concert in London in the 1960s.) Bowie stated, "It's the first time I've felt capable of addressing it." Described by the biographer David Buckley as "an eerie psychodrama", the song features prevalent backwards saxophone work from Bowie.

"Nite Flights" was written by the singer-songwriter Scott Walker (as Scott Engel) and originally recorded by the Walker Brothers for their 1978 album of the same name. Bowie was a huge fan of the album, first hearing it while recording 1979's Lodger, and decided to cover the song for Black Tie White Noise. Musically, Pegg describes it as a "Euro-disco/jazz-funk fusion" evocative of the Berlin Trilogy, while it lyrically predates the content found on Outside. Buckley considers "Pallas Athena", a mostly instrumental track reminiscent of the Berlin era, Bowie's most experimental work in a decade, combining "contemporary hip-hop dance rhythms" with the ambience of Low (1977). Bowie told NME in 1993 that he "[didn't] know what the fuck it's about".

Both "Miracle Goodnight" and "Don't Let Me Down & Down" support the wedding theme. The former is laden with synthesisers and mimics 1980s pop. The latter was originally recorded in Arabic by the Mauritanian singer Tahra Mint Hembara (a friend of Iman's) in 1988 as "T Beyby"; her producer Martine Valmont wrote English lyrics and retitled it "Don't Let Me Down & Down". Bowie discovered it while browsing through Iman's CD collection and decided to cover it as a wedding gift. He stated, "[It was] one of those tracks that sort of in a diary-like way records the beginnings of a relationship." Comparing its arrangement to 1984's Tonight, O'Leary calls it the "most obscure" cover of Bowie's entire career. On its lyrics, Pegg says it recalls the "romantic balladry" of "Win" and "Can You Hear Me?" from Young Americans.

The jazz instrumental "Looking for Lester" features David and Lester Bowie soloing on saxophone and trumpet. The title is a play on John Coltrane's "Chasing the Train". The gospel cover of "I Know It's Gonna Happen Someday" is reminiscent of Bowie's early 1970s ballads, including a direct reference to the climax of "Rock 'n' Roll Suicide" (1972). Pegg describes the track as "Bowie covers Morrissey parodying Ziggy Stardust in the style of Young Americans". The album ends with "The Wedding Song", a vocal version of the opening track. Pegg considers the two tracks throwbacks to "It's No Game", which bookends Scary Monsters (and Super Creeps) (1980).

== Artwork and title ==
The cover artwork was taken by the photographer Nick Knight. The inlay photography depicts Bowie in attire from the "Never Let Me Down" music video (1987): shirtsleeves with a Bogey hat holding a 1940s microphone. According to Buckley, the title was a comment on the racial mix of Bowie and Iman's marriage and the fusion of American and British musical styles Bowie was experimenting with. It was also in debt to the cut-up technique Bowie had discussed in an interview with the writer William S. Burroughs in the mid-1970s. A working title for the album was The Wedding Album. On the title, Bowie told Record Collector in 1993:

White noise itself is something that I first encountered on the synthesiser many years ago. There's black noise and white noise. I thought that much of what is said and done by the whites is white noise. 'Black ties' is because, for me, musically, the one thing that really turned me on to wanting to be a musician, wanting to write, was black music, American black music [...] I found it all very exciting – the feeling of aggression that came through the arrangements.

== Release and promotion ==
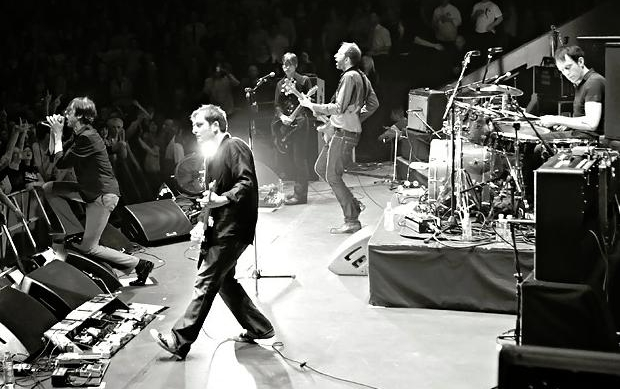
Black Tie White Noise was released amidst the rise of Britpop bands such as Suede (pictured in 2010). An interview with Bowie and Suede's Brett Anderson generated publicity for the two artists.

By the end of 1992, the rise of Britpop bands such as Blur, the Auteurs and Suede had influenced the UK music scene. These artists, particularly Suede, acknowledged Bowie's influence in interviews and their music, with Buckley describing Suede's debut single "The Drowners" as an homage to Bowie's glam rock work of the early 1970s. (Note: Buckley and Pegg also acknowledge Suede's second album Dog Man Star as a tribute to the titles of three early 1970s Bowie works, while their 1999 album Head Music was influenced by Scary Monsters.) Shortly before the release of Suede's debut album and Black Tie White Noise, NME's Steve Sutherland interviewed Bowie and Suede's lead singer Brett Anderson together, where the two discussed influences and exchanged compliments. The interview generated a large amount of publicity for the two artists' upcoming albums in the UK. Additionally, the author Paul Trynka states that Ronson's guest appearance earned Black Tie White Noise more attention.

The lead single, "Jump They Say" backed by a remix of "Pallas Athena", was released on 15 March 1993. It came in numerous formats that contained various remixes of the track, a trend that continued in Bowie's work throughout the rest of the 1990s. The single became the artist's biggest hit since "Absolute Beginners" seven years earlier, peaking at number nine on the UK Singles Chart. It was supported by a Mark Romanek-directed music video featuring numerous references to Bowie's prior work. Pegg calls it one of his finest videos, praising its "non-linear" imagery.

Black Tie White Noise was issued shortly after on 5 April 1993 on different LP and CD formats. (Note: Released in the US on 6 April 1993.) The LP release removed "The Wedding" and "Looking for Lester", while the CD edition featured a remix of "Jump They Say" and the outtake "Lucy Can't Dance". (Note: Rodgers was annoyed that Bowie relegated "Lucy Can't Dance" to a bonus track, telling Buckley it was "a guaranteed number one record" and that he was "already accepting [his] Grammy!") Meanwhile, the Japanese and Singaporean CDs contained a remix of "Pallas Athena" and "Don't Let Me Down & Down", respectively. Before its release, Bowie expressed love for the album, stating, "I don't think I've hit this peak before as a performer and a writer."

The album was a commercial success in the UK, entering the UK Albums Chart at number one and dethroning Suede's debut album; it was Bowie's final UK number one album until The Next Day in 2013. In America, it charted at number 39 on the Billboard 200, although its promotion was affected when Savage Records filed for bankruptcy shortly after its release. Although Bowie had signed a three-album deal, the label sued Bowie claiming substantial losses on Black Tie. The case was dismissed and the label was dissolved; Black Tie White Noise became a rarity in record stores until reissues later in the 1990s.

The title track, backed by a remix of "You've Been Around", was released as the second single on 1 June 1993, credited to David Bowie featuring Al B. Sure! Charting at number 36 in the UK, it was supported by a Romanek-directed music video, featuring both Bowie and Al B. Sure! and displaying, in Pegg's words, "a deft bricolage of images against the backdrop of an urban ghetto." "Miracle Goodnight", backed by "Looking for Lester", was issued as the third and final single in October 1993, charting at number 40 in the UK. Pegg argues it would have been a bigger hit had it been the lead single. "Nite Flights" was intended as the fourth single, but was cancelled by Arista Records following the performances of the two previous singles. Meanwhile, "Pallas Athena" was remixed by numerous DJs and anonymously became a popular club track in London and New York.

== Critical reception ==
Professional ratings
Initial reviews (in 1993)
Review scores
| Source | Rating |
|---|---|
| Calgary Herald | C |
| Chicago Tribune | 2.5/4 stars |
| Entertainment Weekly | D |
| Los Angeles Times | 3/4 stars |
| NME | 6/10 |
| Orlando Sentinel | 1/3 stars |
| The Philadelphia Inquirer | 3/4 stars |
| The Press and Journal | 3/5 stars |
| Rolling Stone | 4/5 stars |
| Select | 2/5 medals |
| The Village Voice | B− |

Black Tie White Noise received generally favourable reviews from music critics on release. Some reviewers considered it Bowie's finest since Scary Monsters. The biographer Christopher Sandford states it was praised for its experimentation but criticised for an overall lack of cohesion. David Sinclair of Q magazine argued Black Tie "picks up where Scary Monsters left off" and "if any collection of songs could reinstate [Bowie's] godhead status, then this is it." He primarily criticised the lack of "obvious" hit singles, but felt the record was full of "imagination and charm" and deemed Bowie's saxophone performances some of his best to date. A reviewer for Billboard was also positive, describing it as a whole "trail-blazing and brilliant", further noting "inspired covers" and echoes of Let's Dance, Scary Monsters and Ziggy Stardust (1972). Rolling Stone's Paul Evans hailed it "one of the smartest records of a very smart career", finding references to the artist's previous works as well as new innovations that "point the way to future risk, to brave changes yet to come". Richard Cromelin of the Los Angeles Times considered it Bowie's "most committed-sounding music in years".

Other reviewers were more negative. A reviewer for Vox magazine found the radio-friendly singles calculated and Bowie's saxophone playing inferior to his musical contributions on "Heroes" (1977), but felt its "bent, ethnic-sounding notes create the album's most atmospheric moments". Dave Thompson found it lacked innovation in The Rocket. Entertainment Weekly's Ken Tucker described Black Tie as a "stultifying yet annoying" record save for "Miracle Goodnight" and "I Know It's Gonna Happen Someday". The veteran critic Robert Christgau said in The Village Voice that the music was Bowie's "most arresting" because of its dance beats and electronic textures, but reacted negatively towards the lyrics.

== Aftermath and legacy ==
Professional ratings
Retrospective reviews (after 1993)
Review scores
| Source | Rating |
|---|---|
| AllMusic | 2.5/5 stars |
| Blender | 2/5 stars |
| Encyclopedia of Popular Music | 3/5 stars |
| Pitchfork | 6.8/10 |
| The Rolling Stone Album Guide | 1/5 stars |
| Spin Alternative Record Guide | 1/10 |
| Uncut | 1.5/5 stars |

Bowie did not tour in support of Black Tie White Noise, telling Record Collector that it "takes up so much time". He also declined an invitation to perform on MTV's Unplugged programme. Instead, he made small appearances on American television and released a film to accompany the album. Directed by Bowie's long-time video director David Mallet, David Bowie: Black Tie White Noise (1993) is a hybrid of interviews, footage shot during the recording sessions and mimed performances of six tracks shot by Mallet on 8 May 1993 at Hollywood Center Studios. Pegg calls it a "useful companion" to the album but finds Mallet's material uninspired. Sandford also considers the Mallet-directed material inferior to the two men's prior collaborations. The film was included as part of EMI's 2003 reissue campaign for the album, with a standalone DVD release following two years later. Although Bowie intended to resume the Tin Machine project following the release of Black Tie, the idea never came to fruition. His next effort was the solo The Buddha of Suburbia, released in November 1993.

Black Tie White Noise marked the beginning of Bowie's commercial revival and improved critical standing, with one reviewer later calling it a perfect way to begin the next chapter of his career. Despite its initial success—Pegg arguing it may have initially been "over-praised"—the album's critical standing in later decades has been mixed. Although several agreed it was his best since Scary Monsters at the time, critics remain divided on its cohesiveness, praising individual tracks but finding the album as a whole subpar. Pegg summarises: "It's a supremely confident, professional and commercial piece of work, and its best moments are exceptional."

Some also felt the production aged poorly, with Trynka saying that its "overpolite, airbrushed sheen" meant that following the fall of Savage Records, "little bemoaned its passing". Others praised Lester Bowie's trumpet playing and David Bowie's vocal performances. In a positive review, BBC Music's David Quantick recognised Black Tie White Noise as a continuation of Scary Monsters, wherein Bowie used aspects of his entire career in new, innovative ways. He credited the production and Bowie's "immense confidence" for an album that rose above its immediate predecessors. In AllMusic, Erlewine called it "an interesting first step in Bowie's creative revival", identifying ideas that Bowie further expanded with on later releases.

In a 2016 retrospective ranking all of Bowie's 26 studio albums from worst to best, Bryan Wawzenek of Ultimate Classic Rock placed Black Tie White Noise at number 25 (above Never Let Me Down). In a 2018 list which included Bowie's two albums with Tin Machine, the writers of Consequence of Sound ranked Black Tie White Noise number 18 out of 28. David Sackllah wrote that the record holds up "fairly well" and, as the beginning of an experimental era, Black Tie "stood as one of his better works from the decade".

=== CD-ROM and reissues ===
In 1994, an interactive CD-ROM based on Black Tie White Noise was developed by ION and released by MPC. The CD-ROM, which Bowie intended to be "fully interactive", gave users a chance to remake the "Jump They Say" video using pre-existing footage and view excerpts from the Black Tie White Noise film. It was not well received, although Perone considered it innovative for its time. Bowie initially expressed excitement in the project, but it ultimately did not live up to his expectations, stating in 1995 that he "absolutely loathed it".

In August 2003, Black Tie White Noise was reissued by EMI in a 3-CD deluxe edition to mark its tenth anniversary. It featured the original album, a CD of remixes and other tracks from the period (such as "Real Cool World"), and the original Black Tie White Noise film. In 2021, the album was remastered and included as part of the box set Brilliant Adventure (1992–2001).

== Track listing ==
All tracks are written by David Bowie, except where noted.

Black Tie White Noise track listing
| No. | Title | Lyrics | Music | Length |
|---|---|---|---|---|
| 1. | "The Wedding" | instrumental | | 5:04 |
| 2. | "You've Been Around" | | Bowie; Reeves Gabrels | 4:45 |
| 3. | "I Feel Free" (featuring Mick Ronson) | Pete Brown | Jack Bruce | 4:52 |
| 4. | "Black Tie White Noise" (featuring Al B. Sure!) | | | 4:52 |
| 5. | "Jump They Say" | | | 4:22 |
| 6. | "Nite Flights" | Noel Scott Engel | Engel | 4:30 |
| 7. | "Pallas Athena" | | | 4:40 |
| 8. | "Miracle Goodnight" | | | 4:14 |
| 9. | "Don't Let Me Down & Down" | Tahra Mint Hembara, trans. Martine Valmont | Hembara | 4:55 |
| 10. | "Looking for Lester" | instrumental | Bowie; Nile Rodgers | 5:36 |
| 11. | "I Know It's Gonna Happen Someday" | Morrissey | Mark E. Nevin | 4:14 |
| 12. | "The Wedding Song" | | | 4:29 |
| Total length: | | | | 56:33 |

Original CD issue bonus tracks
| No. | Title | Remixer(s) | Length |
|---|---|---|---|
| 13. | "Jump They Say" (alternate mix) | JAE-E | 3:58 |
| 14. | "Pallas Athena" (Don't Stop Praying mix) | Meat Beat Manifesto | 5:37 |
| 15. | "Lucy Can't Dance" | | 5:45 |
| Total length: | | | 15:20 (71:53) |

Notes

- "Jangan Susahkan Hatiku" ("Don't Let Me Down & Down" with the first half-sung in Indonesian) supplanted "Don't Let Me Down & Down" in the version of the album released in Indonesia.

== Personnel ==
According to the liner notes and the biographer Nicholas Pegg.

- David Bowie – vocals, guitar, saxophone, dog alto
- Nile Rodgers – guitar
- Poogie Bell, Sterling Campbell – drums
- Barry Campbell, John Regan – bass
- Richard Hilton, Dave Richards, Philippe Saisse, Richard Tee – keyboards
- Michael Reisman – harp, tubular bells, string arrangement
- Gerardo Velez – percussion
- Fonzi Thornton, Tawatha Agee, Curtis King, Jr., Dennis Collins, Brenda White-King, Maryl Epps – background vocals
- Al B. Sure! – vocal duet on "Black Tie White Noise"
- Reeves Gabrels – lead guitar on "You've Been Around"
- Mick Ronson – lead guitar on "I Feel Free"
- Wild T. Springer – lead guitar on "I Know It's Gonna Happen Someday"
- Mike Garson – piano on "Looking for Lester"
- Lester Bowie – trumpet on "You've Been Around", "Jump They Say", "Pallas Athena", "Don't Let Me Down & Down" and "Looking for Lester"
- Fonzi Thornton, Tawatha Agee, Curtis King, Jr., Dennis Collins, Brenda White-King, Maryl Epps, Frank Simms, George Simms, David Spinner, Lamya Al-Mughiery, Connie Petruk, David Bowie, Nile Rodgers – choir on "I Know It's Gonna Happen Someday"

Production

- David Bowie – producer
- Nile Rodgers – producer
- Jon Goldberger, Mike Greene, Dale Schalow, Michael Thompson – engineer
- Gary Tole, Andrew Grassi, Louis Alfred III, Lee Anthony, Neal Perry, Andy Smith – assistant engineer
- Bob Ludwig – mastering engineer
- Nick Knight – photography
- Peter Gabriel – session photography

== Charts ==
=== Weekly charts ===
Weekly chart performance for Black Tie White Noise
| Chart (1993) | Peak Position |
|---|---|
| Australian Albums (ARIA) | 12 |
| Austrian Albums (Ö3 Austria Top 40) | 18 |
| Belgian Albums (Ultratop) | 5 |
| Canadian Albums (RPM) | 13 |
| Danish Albums (Hitlisten) | 6 |
| Dutch Albums (MegaCharts) | 8 |
| European Albums (European Top 100 Albums) | 5 |
| Finnish Albums (Suomen virallinen lista) | 6 |
| French Albums (SNEP) | 14 |
| German Albums (Media Control) | 15 |
| Irish Albums (IFPI) | 7 |
| Italian Albums (Musica e dischi) | 6 |
| Japanese Albums (Oricon) | 4 |
| New Zealand Albums (RIANZ) | 8 |
| Norwegian Albums (VG-lista) | 8 |
| Portuguese Albums (AFP) | 7 |
| Spanish Albums (PROMUSICAE) | 22 |
| Swedish Albums (Sverigetopplistan) | 18 |
| Swiss Albums (Swiss Hitparade) | 18 |
| UK Albums (Official Charts) | 1 |
| US Billboard 200 | 39 |

=== Year-end charts ===
Year-end chart performance for Black Tie White Noise
| Chart (1993) | Position |
|---|---|
| Canadian Albums (RPM) | 90 |
| Dutch Albums (MegaCharts) | 86 |
| European Albums (European Top 100 Albums) | 56 |
| Japanese Albums (Oricon) | 164 |
| UK Albums (OCC) | 100 |

=== Certifications ===
Certifications for Black Tie White Noise
| Region | Certification | Certified units/sales |
|---|---|---|
| Canada (Music Canada) | Gold | 50,000^{^} |
| Japan (RIAJ) | Gold | 111,850 |
| United Kingdom (BPI) | Gold | 100,000^{^} |
Summaries
| Worldwide | — | 1,700,000 |
^{^} Shipments figures based on certification alone.
