= Ricochet (documentary) =

- Cover of Ricochet VHS (1984)
- Original title: Ricochet
- Directed by: Gerry Troyna
- Written by: Martin Stellman
- Produced by: Blasher Bhattacharyaa; Rebecca Dodds; Gerry Troyna; Maya Vision International
- Starring: David Bowie; Carlos Alomar; Steve Elson; Stan Harrison; David Lebolt; Lenny Pickett; Carmine Rojas; Christopher Simms; Frank Simms; Earl Slick; Tony Thompson
- Cinematography: Andy Carchrae
- Edited by: Alan Trott
- Music by: David Bowie
- Distributed by: Maya Vision International
- Release date: 1984 (rerelease 2006)
- Running time: 59 min (rerelease 78 min)
- Country: United Kingdom
- Language: English

Ricochet is a 1984 documentary film about the musician David Bowie. Made with Bowie’s full consent and participation, it was the second of such documentary productions following Cracked Actor from 1975. However, whereas Cracked Actor was made for television by the BBC's Omnibus strand, Ricochet was made for commercial release to the home video market.

The documentary was filmed in the Far East at the very end of Bowie’s 1983 Serious Moonlight Tour. Directed by Gerry Troyna, the film interweaves the documentary format with travelogue, scripted narrative interludes, and some edited live performances by Bowie and his band. It was first released in 1984 on VHS.

== Background ==
Bowie released Let's Dance, his fifteenth studio album, on 14 April 1983. Within weeks both the album and a single of the same name released a month prior were in the top echelons of the UK and US charts. Not only did the album go on to be the most successful of his career so far up to that point, but it also marked a radical change in direction for Bowie. No longer wilfully counter-cultural, alternative, or experimental, Let’s Dance was a considered targeting of a mainstream global audience. The tour to support the album had a similar aim. Bowie said at the time: ‘I was getting really pissed off for being regarded as just a freak… I won’t be trying to put on a pose or stance. You won’t see […] weird Ziggy or whatever. I was just gonna be me, having a good time, as best I can […] That was my premise for this tour: to re-represent myself’.

The Serious Moonlight Tour eventually ran from 18 May – 8 December 1983, beginning at the Vorst Forest Nationaal, Brussels, and concluding in the Hong Kong Coliseum. The original end of tour was planned to be Auckland, New Zealand on 26 November. However, due to receiving an unprecedented $1.5m booking fee earlier in the tour for the US Festival in San Bernardino, Bowie felt he was able to extend the tour to territories where he was likely to make a loss. The US Festival, said Bowie, ‘opened up some places to play, especially in the Far East’. While Bowie had played Japan as a main leg of the tour, a final coda of dates in Singapore, Thailand, and Hong Kong were added and nick-named the ‘Bungle in the Jungle’ tour. As Nicholas Pegg writes, this coda-tour was something Bowie really desired, despite ‘reckoned as a financial loss from the outset’ even with a cutting back on crew, set, and costumes.

Accordingly, four dates were secured at three locations: The National Stadium, Singapore, on 3 December; the Thai Army Stadium, Bangkok, Thailand on 5 December; and two final shows at the Hong Kong Coliseum, Kowloon, Hong Kong on 7 and 8 December. To commemorate this finale of the tour, Bowie asked filmmaker Gerry Troyna to document the trip.

== Content ==
Ricochet focuses upon Bowie in Singapore, Bangkok, and Hong Kong experiencing the countries, cultures and people he meets between performances. In this way it mirrors some of the scenes from Bowie’s previous documentary Cracked Actor. There are shots in limousines and hotel rooms, for instance. However, while in the previous film Bowie was physically wasted, struggling with cocaine addiction, and in a disturbed mental state, in Ricochet the musician is tanned, lucid, and in vibrant health. Chris O’Leary writes ‘Bowie was an embodiment of whiteness, a British royal on a goodwill tour of Japan, Australia, Singapore, Hong Kong, and Bangkok… a David Attenborough figure exploring the mysterious cultures of Southeast Asia’. Author and journalist Charles Shaar Murray writes: ‘he’d become a dashing English gentleman about the arts. I thought, Bloody hell, he’s turning into Prince Charles’. Shaar Murray – from memory – describes Bowie being shown around markets and temples by local dignitaries. However, the film does not includes such scenes, rather, Bowie wanders the cities on his own. Pegg thus comments: ‘Bowie is portrayed as an outsider, slipping away from the pressures of his schedule to wander abroad and soak up the exotic cultures of the three cities… one is reminded here of his Berlin period, a feeling pushed home by the use of two instrumentals from "Heroes" as incidental music’.

Another difference is that while the pretence of the film is – like Cracked Actor – a fly-on-the-wall documentary with some performance footage, there are scenes that are scripted. In Hong Kong there is a story about a young musician attempting to raise money to be able to buy a ticket for the Bowie concert. In Singapore the film follows some young women performers at a Chinese Opera. There is also a sub-plot sketched of Bowie being followed by men in dark suits and sunglasses, evoking moments of paranoia in the artist. It such moments as this that lead O’Leary to call the film Ricochet 'strange'.

== Release history ==
Ricochet was released in 1984 on VHS with a runtime of 59 minutes. In 2006 the documentary was re-released as an extra on the DVD re-issue of the Serious Moonlight live concert film. As well as being remastered, Ricochet also featured 19 minutes of new footage not included in the original release.

== Music and live footage ==
The remastered and extended edition of Ricochet has footage of four live performances: "China Girl"; "Look Back in Anger"; "'Heroes'"; and "Fame". In addition, other Bowie songs (both live and studio recordings) are used as incidental music and there is a live cover version of a Bowie song by a Chinese band.

Title	Type	Audio Visual use	Length	Description
"Station to Station"	Bowie live recording	Audio incidental music	Short extract	Bowie arrives in Hong Kong and is mobbed by fans and the press
"Modern Love"	Bowie studio recording: Let's Dance	Audio incidental music	Short extract	As part of radio advertisement in Chinese language for Bowie's concert; images of Bowie in a limousine and a young man travelling to a band rehearsal
"Ziggy Stardust"	Live rehearsal by Chinese rock band	Audio and visual footage	Short extract	Bowie at hotel after press conference; Chinese rock band rehearsal
"Fashion"	Bowie live recording	Audio incidental music	Medium extract	Night street scenes, Bowie travelling in car. Chinese woman miming to the song. Various images of women's fashion. Various images of Chinese signage and shops. Products. The drummer of the Chinese band at a bar.
"Modern Love"	Bowie studio recording: Let's Dance	Audio incidental music	Short extract	As part of radio advertisement in English language for Bowie's concert; street scene images.
"China Girl"	Bowie live recording: Hong Kong	Audio and visual concert footage	Long extract	Brief sequence during intro of song of Chinese drummer arriving with ticket and Bowie arriving at gig. Rest of sequence is footage from the stage.
"Look Back in Anger"	Bowie live recording: Hong Kong	Audio and visual concert footage	Long extract	Most of sequence is footage from the stage. Ends with Bowie on plane flying to next destination.
"Sense of Doubt"	Bowie studio recording: "Heroes"	Audio incidental music	Long extract	Bowie exists his hotel suite, walks through streets on own at night. Travels on escalator over busy street, bathed in electric blue. Sits on own in deserted mall.
"'Heroes'"	Bowie live recording: Singapore	Audio and visual concert footage	Long extract	Much of song is footage of Bowie's stage performance, intercut with performers preparing for a Chinese opera and their performance. At the end of the sequence Bowie is seen in the audience of the Chinese opera.
"Ricochet"	Bowie studio recording: Let's Dance	Audio incidental music	Long extract	Bowie in car at night and backstage at his gig, being made up for the concert and some footage from the stage (not of "Ricochet"). Bowie in his car again touring through streets at night. Bowie walking the streets. Enters a go-go bar, woman beckons him in. Sits at the back of the bar on his own. Girls dancing on stage. Bowie watching TV showing images of the Thai army. A man in dark glasses watching him. Bowie in taxi alone. This sequence cuts directly to next sequence.
"Moss Garden"	Bowie studio recording: "Heroes"	Audio incidental music (intercut with traditional Thai music)	Long extract	Night-time. Bowie asks about hiring a small boat on the river. Rest of sequence shot from the river as if Bowie's point of view. A man doing exercises under the freeway by the river. Images of the moon. Cuts to Bowie with a traditional Thai healer. Images from the boat as dawn breaks over river.
"Fame"	Bowie live recording: Bangkok	Audio and visual concert footage	Long extract	Beginning sequence: boat images and Bowie in streets. When Bowie starts singing, cuts to performance.
"Moss Garden"	Bowie studio recording: "Heroes"	Audio incidental music	Long extract	End credits

== Online release of more live footage ==
In early 2016, in the immediate wake of Bowie's death, a third performance from the Hong Kong shows appeared online. This was a live and unrehearsed cover of John Lennon’s "Imagine". The date of the last Hong Kong show was 8 December 1983, which was the third anniversary of Lennon’s murder.
