= Owen Frampton =

English art teacher (1919–2005)

- Born: 6 April 1919; London, England
- Died: 16 September 2005 (aged 86); Sussex, England
- Children: Peter Frampton, Clive Frampton

Owen Frampton (6 April 1919 – 16 September 2005) was an English art teacher. He was the father of musician Peter Frampton, and a teacher of musician David Bowie and novelist Hanif Kureishi.

== Early life ==
Frampton was born in the Kennington district of London, England. His family later lived in other communities, including Sheerness and Beckenham.

After the beginning of World War II, he enlisted in the British Army. He became an officer in the Royal Artillery, and participated in the North African Campaign, the Allied invasion of Sicily, and the Battle of Monte Cassino. He left the army and returned to Great Britain in 1946.

== Family ==
In 1941, he married his childhood friend Peggy ffitch, to whom he remained married for 64 years, until his death. They had two sons, Peter and Clive.

Frampton provided Peter with his first musical instrument, a banjolele that had belonged to his mother (Peter's grandmother). After Peter learned to play that, he gave him the gift of a six-string guitar for Christmas. He also introduced him to the music of Django Reinhardt, which Peter Frampton later cited as being influential to his own musical style.

== Teaching career ==
In 1946, while taking classes at Beckenham School of Art, Frampton began teaching in the art department of Beckenham Technical School, later known as Bromley Technical High School, and currently known as the Ravens Wood School. Besides teaching art, Frampton also taught boxing.

His students included David Jones (later David Bowie) and George Underwood, as well as his own sons Peter and Clive. Peter Frampton later reflected on his early interest in performing popular music:

"I asked my father, who was head of the art department at the school, who was into music... ...and he said well there's this David Jones character -- he seems to play guitar and sax. So it was the three of us [Jones, Underwood, and Peter Frampton] exchanging licks really -- they taught me Buddy Holly numbers and I showed them what I knew on guitar --so that's when our friendship started on those stone steps."

Owen Frampton later wrote of his experiences teaching Jones and Underwood in a later (unpublished) autobiography:

"David was quite unpredictable. He was completely misunderstood by most of my teaching colleagues, but in those days, cults were unfashionable and David, by the age of 14, was already a cult figure. At this period in my teaching career, I was thoroughly used to very individualistic pupils and was rarely surprised by anything that occurred. Even when David varied the colour of his hair or cropped it short, or plucked his eyebrows, I accepted his actions as a means of projecting his personality, and of that he had plenty! I did however experience a sense of relief when I obtained employment for both him and George Underwood in advertising studios and at the time I thought that probably it would be the last I would hear of either of them."

Another of his students, Aziz Cami, who would go on to co-found a design consulting firm, said of Frampton, "The school ‘losers’ – the art stream – weren't a lost cause for him... ...His ambition to have his secondary school course recognised as an accredited pre-Diploma year by art colleges was uniquely fulfilled in 1967. He achieved this by encouraging a passion for design which involved us designing book jackets, album covers, TV credits, posters, fabrics, ceramics and furniture at the age of 16."

== Later years ==
After his retirement from teaching at age 60, Owen and Peggy Frampton moved to New York, near Peter's home, but returned to live in England after several years. In the 1970s, Frampton wrote a still-unpublished memoir, Our Way: the Autobiography of a Teacher of Art & Design (The Frampton Papers).
