= Keith Ludeman =

British businessman

Keith Lawrence Ludeman (born 28 January 1950), is a British businessman, former CEO of the Go-Ahead Group and now a Non-Executive Director.

== Early life ==
Ludeman was born in Bromley, Kent, and educated at Bromley Technical High School for Boys (three years below David Bowie - the school is now called the Ravens Wood School) on Oakley Road in Keston, and then undertook a BA in Geography at Newcastle University. After graduating in 1971 he joined Tynemouth and District Transport as a conductor (badge number AA 52142), for a summer job, but stayed for 15 months before undertaking an MSc in Transport Engineering and Planning at the University of Salford, with a thesis entitled: Problems And Planning of Community Railway Stations.

== Career ==
Ludeman then joined the local transport authority in Greater Manchester in the planning department, before switching to line management in Lancashire where he gained his bus driver's licence (badge number N 12281). After eight years he and his wife moved to Hong Kong where he worked as senior transport officer, before becoming a consultant in the private sector and then returning to the United Kingdom selling software for scheduling bus crews.

In 1986, Ludeman became managing director of the council-owned Burnley & Pendle, but after turning a £1million loss to a £1million profit he returned to London to join London Regional Transport. Under Margaret Thatcher's government's privatisation initiative, Ludeman became part of the management team at what became London General, one of 11 bus companies split from London Transport. After six years, Ludeman led a management buyout of London General for £28million.

When the financial backers of London General wanted to sell, Ludeman as a result joined Newcastle-based Go-Ahead in 1996. He was appointed managing director of the group's London bus division in 1997, and then moved over to head the rail division in 1999, renaming the South Central franchise (previously run by Connex) back to the pre-grouping name of Southern. Ludeman had been a main board advisor since 1998, and became a director in September 2004. He was appointed as Chief Executive in July 2006 following the resignation on health grounds of Chris Moyes. Keith Ludeman retired from Go-Ahead Group on 1 July 2011.

Ludeman was presented with an honorary doctorate by University of Salford in July 2010.

Ludeman is a fellow of the Institute of Logistics and Transport and of the Institution of Railway Operators. He was Chairman of the Association of Train Operating Companies (ATOC) until 2005.

Ludeman was Non-Executive Director of Network Rail (July 2011 - July 2014). Ludeman is a Non-Executive Director of Interserve plc (joined January 2011). He was appointed Non-Executive Chairman of Eversholt Rail in June 2014. Ludeman is Chairman of Bristol Water (joined July 2012).

== Personal life ==
Married to Diane, the couple have two daughters. The family home in Shere, Surrey together with a holiday home in Cannes, were bought from the share sale proceeds of Go-Ahead's purchase of London General Omnibus. He enjoys swimming, sailing and scuba diving.
