= Jump They Say =

1993 single by David Bowie

Single by David Bowie

from the album Black Tie White Noise
- B-side: "Pallas Athena" (Don't Stop Praying mix)
- Released: 15 March 1993
- Recorded: April–November 1992
- Studio: 38 Fresh (original writing and recording) (Los Angeles); Mountain (Montreux); The Hit Factory (New York City)
- Length: 4:22 (album version); 3:53 (radio edit)
- Label: Arista; Savage; BMG
- Songwriter: David Bowie
- Producer: Nile Rodgers

David Bowie singles chronology
"Real Cool World" (1992)	"Jump They Say" (1993)	"Black Tie White Noise" (1993)

Music video
- "Jump They Say" on YouTube

"Jump They Say" is a song by English singer-songwriter David Bowie from his 18th album Black Tie White Noise (1993). It was written by Bowie, produced by Nile Rodgers and released as the first single from the album in March 1993 by Arista Records. While Bowie opted not to tour for the Black Tie White Noise album, the song was performed on his 1995–96 Outside Tour and released as part of the live concert No Trendy Réchauffé (Live Birmingham 95) (2020). The accompanying music video for "Jump They Say" was directed by Mark Romanek and received heavy rotation on MTV Europe.

== Background and style ==
The song dealt with Bowie's feelings for his schizophrenic half-brother Terry Burns, who had died by suicide on 16 January 1985 when he walked in front of a train at Coulsdon South railway station, having previously been held in Cane Hill Hospital. Lyrically, the song is loosely based on Burns and Bowie's relationship with and memories of him. Musically, the influence of Nile Rodgers led to a funk-based sound, though the track was also influenced by contemporary jazz, with a solo from avant-jazz trumpeter Lester Bowie.

== Promotion ==
Released on 15 March 1993 as the lead-off single, "Jump They Say" received a considerable promotional push from Bowie's new label, Savage Records (though Arista Records distributed the package in Europe). A striking video was shot by Mark Romanek, depicting Bowie as a businessman paranoid of his colleagues, who seemingly conduct experiments on him and find him a disturbing influence, forcing him to jump from the roof of the corporate building to his death. The video is heavily influenced by Jean-Luc Godard's 1965 film Alphaville, Stanley Kubrick's A Clockwork Orange (1971), as well as Chris Marker's film La Jetée and Orson Welles' The Trial – both from 1962. The uniformed women shown monitoring Bowie through high powered telescopes are an homage to the stewardesses in the Pan-Am space plane in Kubrick's 2001: A Space Odyssey (1968). The video received heavy rotation on MTV Europe in May 1993, and was praised by Entertainment Weekly after Bowie died in 2016, saying "Bowie is an excellent actor, and this video may be his best character performance in a music video."

== Chart performance ==
The song, while not Bowie's first release since Tin Machine, was pushed as a comeback single, and reached No. 9 in the UK charts – Bowie's only top 10 single between 1986's "Absolute Beginners" and 2013's "Where Are We Now?".

== Critical reception ==
Upon the release, Larry Flick from Billboard magazine wrote:

Peek into Bowie's first solo album in [six years] is a kinetic pop/funk throwdown. That incomparable voice wafts over a barrage of jangly guitars, wriggling rhythms, and jolting horns. New collaboration with 'Let's Dance' co-producer Nile Rodgers has the potential to meet with similar top 40 approval, although innovative batch of remixes is already shaping up to be a club favorite here and abroad. A most welcome return.

Jon Selzer from Melody Maker complimented the song as "sophisticated, mock-wayward funk, pretending it's balancing precariously over a tightrope when it's really on solid ground." He added that it's "by far the best thing he's done" since "Let's Dance". Alan Jones from Music Week named it Pick of the Week, describing it as "a typical theatrically crooned throwback to his glory days", and adding, "Club-goers will glory in the Brothers In Rhythm/Leftfield mixes which drag it on to the dancefloor." Parry Gettelman from Orlando Sentinel felt that jazz trumpet player Lester Bowie's brief entrance "enlivens the otherwise pastel 'Jump They Say', which recurs as a remix toward the end of the album." A reviewer from Philadelphia Inquirer constated that Bowie "reaffirms his commitment to arty dance-rock", while Reading Evening Post complimented the song is "surprisingly good". James Hamilton from the Record Mirror Dance Update noted "his droning adenoidal vocal".

In a 2017 retrospective review, Quentin Harrison from Albumism noted that "that romantic energy" from Bowie's marriage to Iman "put a skip in the sonic step of some of the set's darker material", like "Jump They Say". He saw the song lyrically "engage with the personal conflicts that matter to Bowie." Stephen Thomas Erlewine from AllMusic remarked the "paranoid jumble" of the song, naming it one of the "moments" from the album, that "are the first in a long time to feel classically Bowie".

== Track listing ==
- 7" version
1. "Jump They Say" (Radio edit) – 3:53
2. "Pallas Athena" (Don't Stop Praying Mix) – 5:36
- 12", Arista / 74321 139421 (EU)
1. "Jump They Say" (Hardhands Mix) – 5:40
2. "Jump They Say" (Full album version) – 4:22
3. "Jump They Say" (Leftfield 12" vocal) – 7:42
4. "Jump They Say" (Dub Oddity Mix) – 4:44
- 12", Arista / 74 321 13 69 61 (EU)
1. "Jump They Say" (Club Hart remix) – 5:05
2. "Jump They Say" (JAE-E Mix) – 5:32
3. "Jump They Say" (JAE-E Dub) – 4:48
4. "Jump They Say" (Leftfield remix) – 7:41
5. "Jump They Say" (Dub Oddity, another Leftfield remix) – 5:36
6. "Pallas Athena" (Don't Stop Praying Mix) – 5:36
- CD, Arista / 74321 13696 2 (EU)
1. "Jump They Say" (Radio edit) – 3:53
2. "Jump They Say" (JAE-E edit) – 3:58
3. "Jump They Say" (Club Hart remix) – 5:05
4. "Jump They Say" (Leftfield 12" vocal) – 7:42
5. "Pallas Athena" (Album version) – 4:40
6. "Pallas Athena" (Don't Stop Praying Mix) – 5:36
- CD, Arista/ 74321 139422 (UK)
1. "Jump They Say" (7" version) – 3:53
2. "Jump They Say" (Hard Hands Mix) – 5:40
3. "Jump They Say" (JAE-E Mix) – 5:32
4. "Pallas Athena" (Don't Stop Praying Mix) – 5:36

Note: includes "exclusive" 8-page discography, released in 2CD case to house CD2 as well

- CD, Arista / 74321 139432 (UK)
1. "Jump They Say" (Brothers in Rhythm Mix) – 8:28
2. "Jump They Say" (Brothers in Rhythm Instrumental) – 6:25
3. "Jump They Say" (Leftfield 12" vocal) – 7:42
4. "Jump They Say" (Full album version) – 4:22
- CD, Savage Records / 74785-50034-2 (USA)
1. "Jump They Say" (Album Version) – 4:23
2. "Jump They Say" (Radio Edit 1) – 4.02
3. "Jump They Say" (Club Hart remix) – 5:05
4. "Jump They Say" (Leftfield Remix) – 7:41
5. "Pallas Athena" (Album version) – 4:40
6. "Pallas Athena" (Don't Stop Praying Mix) – 5:36

Note: "Jump They Say" (Radio Edit 1) is remixed by JAE-E and is the same as "Jump They Say" (JAE-E edit)

- 12", Arista / BIR 1 (US) (Promotional)
1. "Jump They Say" (Brothers in Rhythm Mix) – 8:28
2. "Jump They Say" (Brothers in Rhythm Instrumental) – 6:25
- 12", Savage Records/BMG / 74785-50042-1 (US)

A1. "Jump They Say" (Brothers in Rhythm mix) – 8:24
A2. "Jump They Say" (Leftfield remix) – 7:41
A3. "Jump They Say" (JAE-E remix) – 5:32
B1. "Jump They Say" (Brothers in Rhythm edit) – 3:54
B2. "Jump They Say" (Dub Oddity remix) – 6:13
B3. "Pallas Athena" (Don't Stop Praying remix) – 5:36

== Live performances ==
Bowie performed the song live on The Arsenio Hall Show in May 1993, and it was performed occasionally on his Outside Tour of 1995–96. A live version of the song was released on the concert album No Trendy Réchauffé (Live Birmingham 95) (2020).

== Other releases ==
The radio edit version has appeared on some editions of the compilations The Singles Collection (1993), Best of Bowie (2002), Nothing Has Changed (2014), and Legacy (2016). The Leftfield 12" vocal mix was released on a UK limited release of the single "Little Wonder" in January 1997. The "JAE-E edit" (called "alternate mix") was released as a bonus track on the CD-version of Black Tie White Noise. On the bonus disc following the 10th anniversary edition of Black Tie White Noise, three remixes of "Jump They Say" appeared: "Rock Mix", "Brothers in Rhythm 12" Remix" and "Dub Oddity".

== Personnel ==
According to Chris O'Leary:

- David Bowie – lead and backing vocal, saxophone
- Nile Rodgers – rhythm guitar
- Barry Campbell or John Regan – bass
- Richard Hilton, Dave Richards, Philippe Saisse, Richard Tee – keyboards
- Poogie Bell or Sterling Campbell – drums
- Lester Bowie – trumpet
- Fonzi Thornton, Tawatha Agee, Curtis King, Jr., Dennis Collins, Brenda White-King, Maryl Epps – background vocals
- Dale Schalow – programming

Technical

- David Bowie – producer
- Nile Rodgers – producer
- Jon Goldberger, Gary Tole, Andrew Grassi – engineering

== Charts ==
=== Weekly charts ===
Chart (1993)	Peak position
Australia (ARIA)	53
Belgium (Ultratop 50 Flanders)	24
Canada Top Singles (RPM)	26
Denmark (IFPI)	9
Europe (Eurochart Hot 100)	19
Europe (European Hit Radio)	1
Finland (Suomen virallinen lista)	19
Germany (GfK)	43
Ireland (IRMA)	12
Netherlands (Dutch Top 40)	17
Netherlands (Single Top 100)	24
New Zealand (Recorded Music NZ)	15
Norway (VG-lista)	7
Portugal (AFP)	7
Spain (AFYVE)	9
Sweden (Sverigetopplistan)	23
Switzerland (Schweizer Hitparade)	40
UK Singles (Official Charts)	9
UK Airplay (Music Week)	1
UK Dance (Music Week)	4
UK Club Chart (Music Week)	3
US Alternative Airplay (Billboard)	4
US Dance Club Songs (Billboard)	6
US Dance Singles Sales (Billboard)	9

=== Year-end charts ===
Chart (1993)	Position
UK Club Chart (Music Week)	99

== Release history ==
Region	Date	Format(s)	Label(s)	Ref.
United Kingdom	15 March 1993	12-inch vinyl; CD; cassette	Arista; Savage; BMG	
Australia	21 March 1993	CD; cassette	Savage; BMG	
Japan	5 April 1993	Mini-CD	Arista; Savage; BMG	

== Bibliography ==
- O'Leary, Chris (2019). Ashes to Ashes: The Songs of David Bowie 1976–2016. London: Repeater. ISBN 978-1-91224-830-8.
- Pegg, Nicholas (2016). The Complete David Bowie (Revised and Updated ed.). London: Titan Books. ISBN 978-1-78565-365-0.
