= Cracked Actor =

1975 British TV documentary by Alan Yentob

- Original title: Cracked Actor
- Directed by: Alan Yentob (uncredited)
- Starring: David Bowie
- Narrated by: Alan Yentob
- Music by: David Bowie
- Country of origin: United Kingdom

Production
- Producers: Carol Bell; Alan Yentob; British Broadcasting Corporation (BBC)
- Cinematography: Michael D. Murphy; David Myers
- Editor: Tony Woollard
- Running time: 60 min.

Original release
- Network: BBC One
- Release: 26 January 1975

Cracked Actor (also known as Cracked Actor: A Film About David Bowie and Cracked Actor: David Bowie) is a 1975 television documentary film about the musician David Bowie, made by Alan Yentob for the BBC's Omnibus strand. It was first shown on BBC1 on 26 January 1975.

It was filmed in 1974 when Bowie was struggling with cocaine addiction, and the documentary has become notable for showing his mental state during this period.

== Content ==
The documentary depicts Bowie on tour in Los Angeles, using a mixture of documentary sequences filmed in limousines and hotels, and concert footage. Most of the concert footage was taken from a show at the Los Angeles Universal Amphitheatre on 2 September 1974. There were also excerpts from D. A. Pennebaker's concert film Ziggy Stardust and the Spiders from Mars, which had been shot at London's Hammersmith Odeon on 3 July 1973, as well as a few other performances from the tour. Cracked Actor is notable for being a source for footage of Bowie's ambitious Diamond Dogs Tour.

== Production ==
The title of the documentary was originally to be The Collector, after a comment that Bowie had made to interviewer Russell Harty the previous year, whereby he described himself as "a collector of accents". Yentob and his team were given the task of documenting Bowie's famous Diamond Dogs tour, which was already underway when they started filming. Locations for the documentary mainly centred on Hollywood and Los Angeles, but there was also concert footage taken from Philadelphia. A number of performances from the tour were shown, including the songs "Space Oddity", "Cracked Actor", "Sweet Thing/Candidate", "Moonage Daydream", "The Width of a Circle", "Aladdin Sane", "Time", "Diamond Dogs" and "John, I'm Only Dancing (Again)".

== Legacy ==
The tour and film coincided with a prolific time in Bowie's recording and acting career. During the summer of 1974, Bowie started recording at Sigma Studios Philadelphia for what became the Young Americans LP. After seeing an advanced screening of the film, director Nicolas Roeg immediately contacted Bowie to discuss The Man Who Fell to Earth. Photos from Bowie in the US in 1974 on tour and recording, of which some sequences can be seen in Cracked Actor, have been used elsewhere, including the cover of David Live and inserts for the Rykodisc and anniversary booklets for the CD pressings of the LPs that include "Young Americans". Biographer Nicholas Pegg calls Cracked Actor "arguably the finest documentary made about David Bowie," while Paul Trynka considers it one of the greatest music documentaries ever made.

In 1987, while working on his album Never Let Me Down, Bowie reflected in an interview about his state of mind during the time the film was made:

I was so blocked ... so stoned ... It's quite a casualty case, isn't it. I'm amazed I came out of that period, honest. When I see that now I cannot believe I survived it. I was so close to really throwing myself away physically, completely.

In 2013, Alan Yentob said of the film: "I'd caught him at what was an intensely creative time, but it was also physically and emotionally gruelling. Our encounters tended to take place in hotel rooms in the early hours of the morning or in snatched conversations in the back of limousines. He was fragile and exhausted but also prepared to open up and talk in a way he had never really done before."

A BBC article published in 2023 described the airing of the documentary as one of Bowie's "key career moments".

== Commercial status ==
The documentary remains officially unreleased, though there are bootleg video copies circulating as a result of the programme being shown again by the BBC in the early 1990s and more recently in 2007, 2008, 2013 and 2025 following Alan Yentob’s death.

== Reception ==
The Guardian wrote: " 'I never wanted to be a rock'n'roll star,' claims Bowie, somewhat disingenuously, at the start of Alan Yentob's 1975 over-your-shoulder rockumentary. It was filmed mostly in the United States, where Bowie decamped after killing off Ziggy Stardust, his most celebrated character, at a time when Bowie was at the height of his fame, and in the process of inventing his Thin White Duke persona. The interviews with his acid-casualty fans ("I'm just a space cadet. He's the commander") would not look out of place in Spinal Tap; nor would the interview with David describing how difficult it is for him to cope with the sudden fame and adulation, all the while sniffing ostentatiously. It's unlikely that anyone has fancied themselves quite so rotten since Bowie. Maverick genius or pretentious tosser? You be the judge."

The Daily Telegraph wrote: "Cracked Actor is the archetypal profile of the eccentric artist. Alan Yentob (who has spent the rest of his onscreen career striving in vain to bottle the same magic) hangs out with David Bowie in Thin White Duke mode, rampant creativity visibly fuelled by cocaine as the Diamond Dogs tour crossed America. Seldom had a star looked so remote from reality; it is no coincidence that watching the gaunt, damaged Bowie being driven around the parched Californian landscapes inspired Nic Roeg to cast him as a licentious alien in The Man Who Fell to Earth."
